= Deaths in April 1980 =

The following is a list of notable deaths in April 1980.

Entries for each day are listed alphabetically by surname. A typical entry lists information in the following sequence:

- Name, age, country of citizenship at birth, subsequent country of citizenship (if applicable), reason for notability, cause of death (if known), and reference.

== April 1980 ==
=== 1 ===
- S. A. Ayer, 81, Indian politician.
- Jack Bonnyman, 60, Australian footballer.
- Hope Collins, 75, Australian footballer.
- Ismayil Daghistanli, 73, Soviet Azerbaijani actor.
- Joseph Desfosses, 82, Canadian politician.
- Ambrose Flack, 78, American novelist.
- Concetto Gallo, 67, Italian politician and Sicilian nationalist activist.
- Kosuke Gomi, 58, Japanese novelist, lung cancer.
- Clementina D. Griffin, 93, American academic administrator.
- Sandy Gunn, 89, Scottish rugby player.
- Joyce Heron, 63, British actress.
- Hervé Morvan, 63, French painter.
- Oldwig von Natzmer, 75, German general.
- Corrado Schlaepfer, 57, Swiss Olympic fencer (1948).
- Christian Sole, 83, Norwegian politician.
- Bert Taylor, 79, Australian footballer.
- Knut Richard Thyberg, 83, Swedish diplomat.

=== 2 ===
- Edmund Burns, 87, American actor.
- Dick Howorth, 70, English cricketer.
- Harold Johnson, 58, American astronomer, heart attack.
- Raymond Lantier, 93, French archaeologist.
- Art Lasky, 70, American boxer.
- Russell Paulson, 82, American politician, member of the Wisconsin State Assembly (1951–1955).
- Stanley Forman Reed, 95, American jurist, associate justice of the U.S. Supreme Court (1938–1957).
- Louis B. Seltzer, 82, American journalist.
- George Wallach, 97, Scottish Olympic runner (1912).

=== 3 ===
- Archie Benn, 83, Australian politician.
- Sir Hugh Boustead, 84, British diplomat.
- Herbert Bowman, 82, American tennis player, heart attack.
- Delbert L. Bristol, 61, American soldier.
- Sir Edward Bullard, 72, British geophysicist.
- Isla Cameron, 53, British actress and singer, choked.
- Sir Douglas Campbell, 80, British general.
- Ulick Richardson Evans, 91, British chemist.
- Luella Gear, 82, American actress.
- Robert Lemaignen, 87, French politician.
- Bob Linton, 77, American baseball player.
- Mary McCarty, 56, American actress (Trapper John, M.D.).
- Barry Metcalfe, 44, Australian footballer.
- Park In-deok, 83, South Korean writer and activist.
- Bob Trowbridge, 49, American baseball player, embolism.
- Ella Watson, 97, American charwoman, subject of American Gothic (photograph).

=== 4 ===
- Rita Romilly Benson, 79, American actress and acting teacher.
- Aleksander Ford, 71, Polish filmmaker, suicide.
- Roy Gordon, 81, Canadian chemist.
- Han Groenewegen, 91, Dutch architect.
- Maurice Gusman, 91, Russian-born American businessman and philanthropist.
- Ray Lawson, 93, Canadian politician, lieutenant governor of Ontario (1946–1952).
- Marie-Thérèse Pinto, 85, Chilean sculptor active in Paris.
- Alice Orme Smith, 91, American landscape architect.
- Red Sovine, 62, American country musician, traffic collision.
- Władysław Tatarkiewicz, 94, Polish philosopher and historian.
- Robert Emmet Tracy, 70, American Roman Catholic prelate.
- Bell I. Wiley, 74, American historian.

=== 5 ===
- Alexander Belov, 56, Soviet soldier.
- Max Cetto, 77, German-Mexican architect.
- Antonio Gattorno, 76, Cuban-American painter.
- Breta Luther Griem, 82, American dietician.
- Pavel Markov, 83, Soviet theatre critic.
- Wesley Oler, 88, American baseball player and Olympic athlete (1912).
- Georges Piot, 83, French Olympic rower (1924, 1928).
- Jocelyn Ryburn, 70, New Zealand philanthropist, fall.
- Bakri Sapalo, 84, Ethiopian linguist, developed the Oromo language writing system.
- Ruffy Silverstein, 66, American professional wrestler, amyotrophic lateral sclerosis.
- Dick Smith, 68, American football player.
- Roy Stewart, 78, American football coach, complications from surgery.
- Hans Vogel, 80, German helminthologist.

=== 6 ===
- Antony Balch, 42, English filmmaker, stomach cancer.
- John Collier, 78, British author.
- Nils Ericson, 74, Swedish actor and singer.
- Barry Fisher, 46, Australian cricketer, suicide.
- Sir T. M. Knox, 79, British philosopher and academic administrator.
- Frank Saker, 72, Canadian Olympic canoeist (1936).
- Mahmoud Shaker, 53, Egyptian Air Force marshal, heart attack.
- Kustaa Vilkuna, 77, Finnish linguist and historian.

=== 7 ===
- Malcolm Braly, 54, American author, traffic collision.
- Sir Lancelot Cutforth, 80, British general.
- Michel Delesalle, 72, French Olympic ice hockey player (1936).
- Sir Charles F. Goodeve, 76, Canadian chemist, complications from Parkinson's disease.
- Ricky Lancelotti, 35, American singer, drug overdose.
- Maria Michi, 58, Italian actress.
- Yuri Milonov, 84, Soviet political activist.
- Armando Miranda, 40, Brazilian footballer.
- Balkrishna Mohoni, 78, Indian cricketer.
- Paddy O'Connell, 91, Irish footballer.
- Jakob Rosenberg, 86, German-American art historian and curator.

=== 8 ===
- Abdul Karim al-Shaikhly, 42, Iraqi politician and diplomat, assassinated.
- Wilhelm Arwe, 82, Swedish ice hockey player.
- Bill Eastman, 68, British soldier.
- Boy Edgar, 65, Dutch jazz musician, physician and humanitarian.
- Michael T. Gottlieb, 79, American bridge player.
- Fred Hartley, 74, Scottish pianist and composer.
- Alexis Nihon, 77, Belgian-born Canadian businessman.
- Vincenzo Pinton, 66, Italian Olympic fencer (1936, 1948, 1952).
- Harry Williams, 81, English footballer.
- Kōjirō Yoshikawa, 76, Japanese sinologist.

=== 9 ===
- Muhammad Baqir al-Sadr, 45, Iraqi Islamic scholar, torture murder.
- Kathleen Burke, 66, American actress and model.
- Mieczysław Chmura, 46, Polish ice hockey player, embolism.
- A. G. Drachmann, 88, Danish historian and librarian.
- Finn Halse, 69, Norwegian novelist.
- Howard Harpster, 72, American football player and coach, cancer.
- Arturo Matte, 86, Chilean politician.
- Ed Morgan, 75, American baseball player.
- Ichiro Nakayama, 81, Japanese economist.

=== 10 ===
- Frank P. Culver Jr., 90, American jurist.
- Ernst Gottlieb, 87, Czechoslovak-Brazilian Olympic tennis player (1924).
- Byron F. Johnson, 85, American general.
- Kay Medford, 63, American actress (Funny Girl), cancer.
- Corrado Pavolini, 82, Italian writer.
- Karl Hermann Pillney, 84, Austrian pianist and composer.
- Janis Rácenis, 65, Latvian-Venezuelan zoologist.
- Antonia White, 81, British novelist.

=== 11 ===
- Maurice Blomme, 53, Belgian racing cyclist.
- Charley Borah, 74, American Olympic athlete (1928).
- Cousin Emmy, 77, American country musician.
- Ernie Collett, 65, English footballer, traffic collision.
- Sidney Dickinson, 89, American painter.
- Norman Hargreaves-Mawdsley, 58, British historian, heart attack.
- Charlotte Henry, 66, American actress (Alice in Wonderland, Babes in Toyland, Jungle Menace), cancer.
- Ümit Kaftancıoğlu, 44–45, Turkish journalist and television producer, shot.
- Florence Lake, 75, American actress.
- Sir Tom Macdonald, 81, New Zealand politician.
- Wayne McCall, 61, American politician, member of the Florida House of Representatives (since 1974), cancer.
- Einar Østvedt, 76, Norwegian historian.
- Nicholas Phipps, 66, British actor and screenwriter.
- Bruce Scharp, 74, Australian footballer.
- Ehtisham ul Haq Thanvi, 64, Pakistani Islamic scholar, heart attack.
- Jim Toohey Sr., 93, Australian footballer.
- József Tunyogi, 73, Hungarian Olympic wrestler (1932).
- Vernon S. Welch, 73, American politician, member of the Minnesota House of Representatives (1939–1954).
- Yakov Zarobyan, 71, Soviet Armenian politician.

=== 12 ===
- Ruggero Bonomi, 82, Italian general.
- Stanley de Silva, 23, Sri Lankan cricketer, traffic collision.
- Maria Dietz, 86, German politician.
- Adolf Ehrecke, 80, German politician and Nazi official.
- Izydora Kosach-Borysova, 92, Soviet Ukrainian-American writer and agronomist.
- Louis Litif, 45, American bookmaker and drug trafficker, shot.
- Clark McConachy, 84, New Zealand billiards and snooker player.
- Toshio Mori, 70, American author.
- Mel Preibisch, 65, American baseball player.
- Arkady Severny, 41, Soviet singer, stroke.
- Bruce Shanks, 72, American editorial cartoonist.
- Al Sidorik, 60, American football player.
- William Tolbert, 66, Liberian politician, president (since 1971) and vice president (1952–1971), shot.
- Manouchehr Vazifekhah, 39–40, Iranian interrogator, shot.
- Sonja Wigert, 66, Norwegian-Swedish actress and spy.

=== 13 ===
- Frederick D. Alexander, 70, American politician and civil rights activist.
- Suroor Barabankvi, 61, Pakistani poet and lyricist, heart attack.
- Earl Brown, 79, American baseball player and politician.
- Cecil Arthur Butler, 77, Australian businessman.
- Frank Crowley, 70, American Olympic runner (1932).
- Markus Höttinger, 23, Austrian racing driver, racing crash.
- Stan Huntington, 90, Australian footballer.
- Leslie William Leigh, 59, Sierra Leonean police officer and pilot, heart attack.
- Sir Arthur Massey, 86, British physician and author.
- Humphrey Procter-Gregg, 84, English composer.
- Harold E. Rosecrans, 83, American general.
- Karl Stegger, 67, Danish actor.
- Charles Edward Michael Terry, 82–83, Hong Kong businessman.
- Pepino Toledo, 60, Guatemalan footballer, traffic collision.
- Oliver Vardy, 73, Canadian politician.

=== 14 ===
- Shimon Dzigan, 74, Polish-Israeli comedian, heart attack.
- Tom Fadden, 85, American actor.
- Ferenc Farkas de Kisbarnak, 87, Hungarian general and scouting leader.
- John McGrath, 52, Irish hurler.
- Raymond Munro Myers, 85, Canadian politician.
- Gianni Rodari, 59, Italian children's author, complications from surgery.
- Elisa Elvira Zuloaga, 79, Venezuelan painter and engraver.

=== 15 ===
- Gerty Archimède, 70, Guadeloupean politician.
- Raymond Bailey, 75, American actor (The Beverly Hillbillies), heart attack.
- Donald Elmer Black, 88, Canadian politician, MP (1935–1953).
- Sir Ian Campbell, 81, British naval admiral.
- Paul Langton, 66, American actor (Peyton Place).
- Marius Matheron, 86, French racing cyclist.
- Jimmy Moore, 91, English footballer.
- Pablo Olmedo, 51, Spanish footballer.
- Marshall Reed, 62, American actor, stroke.
- Catherine Salkeld, 70, Scottish actress.
- Jean-Paul Sartre, 74, French philosopher, playwright and literary critic, Nobel Prize laureate (1964), pulmonary edema.
- Barry Stead, 40, English cricketer, cancer.
- Zenmaro Toki, 94, Japanese poet.
- Bernice M. Watson, 78, American politician, member of the Michigan House of Representatives (1947–1948).

=== 16 ===
- Jerry Conway, 78, American baseball player.
- Verne Lewellen, 78, American football player and executive.
- Lawrence Ogilvie, 81, Scottish plant pathologist.
- Stanley Osler, 73, South African rugby player.
- Robert Pinchon, 66, Martinique priest and archaeologist.
- Josef Schmitt, 72, German footballer.
- Morris Stoloff, 81, American composer.

=== 17 ===
- Anna Maria Dengel, 88, Austrian physician and missionary.
- Hooks Iott, 60, American baseball player.
- Leslie Stephen George Kovasznay, 62, Hungarian-American engineer.
- Ed Miller, 91, American baseball player.
- Kálmán Nádasdy, 75, Hungarian film director.
- Frosty Peters, 75, American football player.
- Josie Alice Quart, 84, Canadian politician.
- John Saxton, 65, British physicist.
- Alf Sjöberg, 76, Swedish film director, traffic collision.
- Alexander Abel Smith, 75, British banker and businessman.
- Humberto Tozzi, 46, Brazilian footballer.

=== 18 ===
- Horace Bigelow, 82, American chess player.
- Antonio Caponigro, 68, American mobster, bludgeoned.
- Igino Giordani, 85, Italian politician and journalist.
- Vasiliy Grabin, 80, Soviet artillery designer.
- Paul Hazoumé, 90, Beninese politician and writer.
- Hans-Georg Leyser, 83, German general.
- Emil Olszowy, 58, American politician, member of the New Jersey General Assembly (since 1976), heart attack.
- Nemesi Ponsati, 92, Spanish sports executive.
- Ernst Posner, 87, German archivist.
- Ellen Sinding, 81, Norwegian actress and dancer.
- Leo Hewlett Thebaud, 90, American naval admiral.
- Suut Kemal Yetkin, 76, Turkish writer and academic administrator.

=== 19 ===
- Tony Beckley, 50, English actor, cancer.
- Joseph Breuer, 98, Hungarian-born German-American rabbi, heart attack.
- Ronald Brinton, 77, English cricketer.
- Paulo Carvoeiro, 49, Brazilian footballer.
- Amyas Connell, 78, New Zealand architect.
- Sid Gautreaux, 67, American baseball player.
- Raphael Hamilton, 87, American historian and archivist.
- Fabian Hoffman, 63, American football player.
- Charles Seel, 82, American actor.
- Arnold Seppo, 62, Soviet Estonian surgeon.
- John Vander Horst, 68, American Episcopal prelate.

=== 20 ===
- Begum Badrunnessa Ahmed, 76–77, Bangladeshi social activist.
- Günther Ballier, 79, German actor.
- Charles Stanley Blair, 52, American jurist and politician, member of the Maryland House of Delegates (1963–1966), heart attack.
- Ronnie Boykins, 44, American jazz bassist.
- M. Canagaratnam, 56, Sri Lankan politician, MP (since 1977), injuries sustained from a gunshot wound.
- Katherine Kennicott Davis, 87, American songwriter ("The Little Drummer Boy").
- Sir Stephen Holmes, 83, British diplomat.
- Helmut Käutner, 72, German film director (The Captain from Köpenick).
- Hilde Konetzni, 75, Austrian opera singer.
- John Mackie, 70, Scottish footballer.

=== 21 ===
- Dante Agostini, 59, Italian-born French drummer.
- Alf Clint, 74, Australian Anglican priest.
- John Howell Collier, 81, American general.
- Ray Dobens, 73, American baseball player.
- Grigoriy Dovzhenko, 80, Soviet Ukrainian muralist.
- Ľudovít Fulla, 78, Slovak painter and stage designer.
- Raúl Gormaz, 65, Chilean politician.
- Kirill Ilyashenko, 64, Soviet Moldovan politician.
- Bob Jellison, 71, American actor (I Love Lucy), liver disease.
- Alexander Oparin, 86, Soviet biochemist.
- Joe Page, 62, American baseball player.
- Theo Rutten, 80, Dutch politician.
- Omar Sahnoun, 24, French footballer, heart attack.
- Sohrab Sepehri, 51, Iranian poet and painter, leukemia.

=== 22 ===
- Helmuth Ellgaard, 67, German artist and illustrator.
- Jane Froman, 72, American actress and singer, cardiac arrest.
- Clark Hamilton, 81, American politician, member of the Idaho Senate (1949–1954).
- Mustafa Edige Kirimal, 68–69, Russian-German Lipka Tatar politician.
- Jim Lind, 67, Canadian politician, MP (1965–1972).
- Zivar Mammadova, 77, Soviet Azerbaijani sculptor.
- Colin Maud, 77, British naval officer.
- Mangu Ram, 94, Indian politician.
- Denis Ryan, 63, Australian footballer.
- Emma Fall Schofield, 94, American jurist.
- Decio Scuri, 75, Italian basketball coach.
- Fritz Strassmann, 78, German chemist.
- Peter Tait, 73, Scottish rugby player.
- August von Finck Sr., 81, German banker and businessman.
- Notable Liberians executed by firing squad:
  - Joseph Chesson, 60–61, politician and jurist.
  - Cecil Dennis, 49, politician and diplomat.
  - Richard Abrom Henries, 71, politician.
  - James A. A. Pierre, 71, jurist.
  - Frank E. Tolbert, 70, politician.
  - E. Reginald Townsend, 62, politician and journalist.

=== 23 ===
- Sergio Goity, 50, Chilean footballer.
- George J. Hecht, 84, American publisher (Parents) and businessman (FAO Schwarz).
- Tadashi Hyōdō, 81, Japanese aviator.
- Sir John Methven, 54, British businessman, heart attack.
- Alfredo Poledrini, 65, Italian Roman Catholic prelate and diplomat.
- Jim Roche, 69, Irish hurler.
- David Cleghorn Thomson, 79, Scottish journalist, playwright and politician.
- John Mitchell Watt, 87, South African physician.

=== 24 ===
- James Buis, 77, Dutch Roman Catholic prelate.
- Alejo Carpentier, 75, Cuban novelist and musicologist, cancer.
- Enrique Chaffardet, 72, Venezuelan boxer.
- Macli-ing Dulag, 50, Filipino Butbut tribal leader, shot.
- Thomas K. Finletter, 86, American diplomat and politician.
- W. E. G. Louw, 66, South African poet.
- Johnny McIlwaine, 75, Scottish footballer.
- Phil McQueen, 84, Australian footballer.
- Dink Mothell, 82, American baseball player.
- Beryl Richmond, 72, American baseball player.
- Gurbachan Singh, 49, Indian Sikh guru, shot.
- Serge Semenenko, 76, Russian-born American banker.
- Arlin Turner, 70, American biographer.
- Arthur Welsby, 77, English footballer.

=== 25 ===
- Zhay Clark, 84, American harpist.
- Bertrand Flornoy, 70, French archaeologist and politician.
- Jack Gannon, 97, Irish cricketer.
- George F. Guy, 75, American politician, member of the Wyoming House of Representatives (1949), Wyoming attorney general (1955–1957).
- Richard Lert, 94, Austrian-born American conductor.
- Katia Mann, 96, German-American actress and singer.
- Bob McNicol, 47, Scottish footballer, plane crash.
- Frank Rogers, 46, New Zealand politician, complications from a stroke.
- Sondur Sriniwasachar, 57, Indian pathologist.

=== 26 ===
- Jack Buckley, 72, Australian footballer.
- Dame Cicely Courtneidge, 87, Australian-born British actress and singer.
- Doug Jackson, 55, Canadian ice hockey player.
- Franziska Kinz, 83, Austrian actress.
- Kaare Larsen, 65, Norwegian Olympic wrestler (1948).
- Vanshidhar Shukla, 76, Indian politician and poet.
- Irene Ward, 85, British politician, MP (1931–1945, 1950–1974) and member of the House of Lords (since 1975).
- Antoni Żabko-Potopowicz, 84, Polish economist.

=== 27 ===
- Mario Bava, 65, Italian filmmaker (The Girl Who Knew Too Much, Danger: Diabolik, Planet of the Vampires), heart attack.
- Walter Béneke, 49, Salvadoran politician and diplomat, shot.
- E. Martin Browne, 80, British theatre director.
- Arthur L. Buck, 73, American politician, member of the Wyoming House of Representatives (1957–1971, 1974–1978).
- John Culshaw, 55, English record producer, hepatitis.
- Rube Ehrhardt, 85, American baseball player.
- Antoni Głowacki, 70, Polish-New Zealand flying ace.
- Fritz Gygli, 83, Swiss chess player.
- Jageshwar Prasad Khalish, 85, Indian politician.
- Lothar Popp, 93, German revolutionary (Kiel mutiny).
- Gabi Rosendoren, 32, Israeli footballer.
- Esther Silveus, 77, American radiologist.
- A. L. Strand, 86, American entomologist and academic administrator.
- Alfred Verdross, 90, Austrian lawyer and jurist.
- John Grieve Woods, 80, Australian physician and soldier.

=== 28 ===
- Andrija Anković, 42, Croatian football player and manager, heart attack.
- Tommy Caldwell, 30, American bassist, injuries sustained in a traffic collision.
- John Chipper, 69, English-Papua New Guinean politician and businessman, heart attack.
- Albert Guarnieri, 80, American football player.
- Helwig Luz, 87, German general.
- Johnny Mackorell, 67, American football player.
- Armando Massiglia, 69, Italian footballer.
- Bob Porterfield, 56, American baseball player, lymphoma.
- Chino Pozo, 64, Cuban drummer.
- Vittore Ugo Righi, 70, Italian Roman Catholic prelate.
- Thomas G. W. Settle, 84, American naval admiral and balloonist.
- Rudolf Sieverts, 76, German legal scholar.

=== 29 ===
- Millar Burrows, 90, American biblical scholar.
- William Clemens, 74, American film director.
- Alan E. Freedman, 90, American film processor.
- Jean Gobet, 91, French actor.
- Sylvan Ambrose Hart, 73, American mountain man.
- Magnus Hellström, 79, Swedish Olympic sailor (1924).
- Sir Alfred Hitchcock, 80, English filmmaker (Psycho, The Birds, North by Northwest), kidney failure.
- Giovanni Host-Venturi, 87, Italian politician and historian, suicide.
- Ruth Hughey, 80, American literary scholar.
- Aslam Khan, 45, Pakistani cricketer,
- Martin Kristensen, 58, Danish footballer.
- Bill Rutherford, 50, Scottish footballer.
- Ray Shaw, 66, English football player and manager.

=== 30 ===
- Harold Robert Aaron, 58, American general, heart attack.
- C. E. Attygalle, 75, Sri Lankan politician, MP (1947–1956).
- Arthur Banner, 61, English footballer.
- Sir Hildreth Glyn-Jones, 85, British barrister.
- Stanisław Gołąb, 77, Polish mathematician.
- August Thayer Jaccaci, 86, American flying ace.
- Sigurd Kander, 90, Swedish Olympic sailor (1912).
- Louis Kronenberger, 75, American literary critic, complications from Alzheimer's disease.
- Jack Latchford, 70, English cricketer.
- John Edgar McCafferty, 60, American Roman Catholic prelate.
- Thomas McMillan, 61, Scottish politician, MP (since 1966), complications from a fall.
- Luis Muñoz Marín, 82, Puerto Rican politician and journalist, governor (1949–1965).
- Stanley Snedden, 77, New Zealand lawn bowler.
- Joe Tuminelli, 60, American baseball player.
