= Latchford =

Latchford may refer to:

== Places ==
=== Australia ===
- Latchford Barracks, Australian Army base

=== Canada ===
- Latchford, Ontario, town

=== United Kingdom ===
- Latchford, Cheshire, a suburb of Warrington, England
  - Latchford railway station
  - Runcorn to Latchford Canal
- Latchford, Hertfordshire, in Standon parish
- Latchford, Oxfordshire, in Great Haseley parish

== People ==
- Bob Latchford (born 1951), British international footballer
- Dave Latchford (born 1949), British footballer
- Douglas Latchford (1931–2020), British adventurer, art dealer, author and alleged smuggler
- Ernest William Latchford (1889–1962), Australian army colonel
- Francis Robert Latchford (1856–1938), Canadian politician
- Jack Latchford (1909–1980), British cricketer
- Peter Latchford (born 1952), English footballer
- Stephen Latchford (1883–1974), American diplomat and lawyer
