= 1913 in Iran =

- Decades
- See also: Other events of 1913; Years in Iran

The following lists events that happened during 1913 in Qajar era.

== Incumbents ==
- Monarch: Ahmad Shah Qajar
- Prime Minister: Najaf-Qoli Khan Bakhtiari (until January 18), Mohammad-Ali Ala ol-Saltaneh (January 18 – August 16), Mostowfi ol-Mamalek (starting August 17)

== Births ==
- January 21 – Taghi Zohouri, Iranian actor.
- July 19 – Manouchehr Sotoudeh, Iranian historian.
- July 20 – Hassan Toufanian, Iranianmilitary officer.
- August 3 – Mohammad Ghazi (translator), Iranian translator.
- October 19 – Sumbat Der Kiureghian, Iranian-armenian artist.
- December 8 – Abdol Hossein Dastgheib, Iranian Twelver Shia cleric.
- December 16 – Ali-Mohammad Khademi, Iranian lieutenant general and business executive.
- ? – Homa Shaibany, Iranian scientist.
- ? – Mahmoud Behzad, Iranian biologist.
- ? – Manouchehr Vazifekhah, SAVAK employee.
- ? – Maryam Farman Farmaian, Qajar princess.
- ? – Mohammad-Vali Gharani, Iranian military officer.
- ? – Shams ol-Moluk Mosahab, Iranian writer.
- ? – Siah Khan, Gigantism patient.
- ? – Nosratollah Jahanshahlou, Iranian politician.
