= Otojirô Itô =

Early pioneer in Japanese civil aviation

- 伊藤音次郎
- Born: June 3, 1891; Osaka, Ebisu-chô（now Naniwa-ku）
- Died: December 26, 1971 (aged 80)
- Occupation: aviator

Otojirô Itô (伊藤音次郎, Itô Otojirô) (June 3, 1891 – December 26, 1971) was an early pioneer in Japanese civil aviation. He is known for establishing the Ito Aircraft Research Center, training a number of new pilots, and for the development of Japanese-made aircraft.

== Biography ==
Itô was born in 1891 in southern Osaka. He worked for the Sadojima Firm after finishing primary school, but gained an intense interest in aviation after seeing a motion picture about the Wright Brothers when he was 17.

In September 1909, after reading an article about the new biplane developed by Sanji Narahara, Itô wrote a letter to Narahara pleading to be employed as a pilot. At Narahara’s urging, Itô began taking night classes on mechanical engineering at the Kôshu Gakko (now Kogakuin University). He continued to maintain a correspondence with Narahara for many years.

Itô continued to pursue his interest in aviation while still working his old job, and in 1910 traveled to Tokyo. There, he became an unpaid worker at Sanji Narahara’s short-lived Tokyo Aircraft Manufacturing, assisting Narahara as his pupil.

Initially, Itô performed various tasks at the factor, but after completing three months of compulsory military service in 1912, he returned to factory work (in the interim, Narahara’s Tokyo Aircraft Manufacturing had been closed down). After receiving instruction from Shiga Murasaki, he received his pilot’s license, second degree. In February 1915, following Narahara Sanji’s departure from the aviation community, Itô established the Itô Aircraft Research Center in present day Mihama Ward of Chiba City.

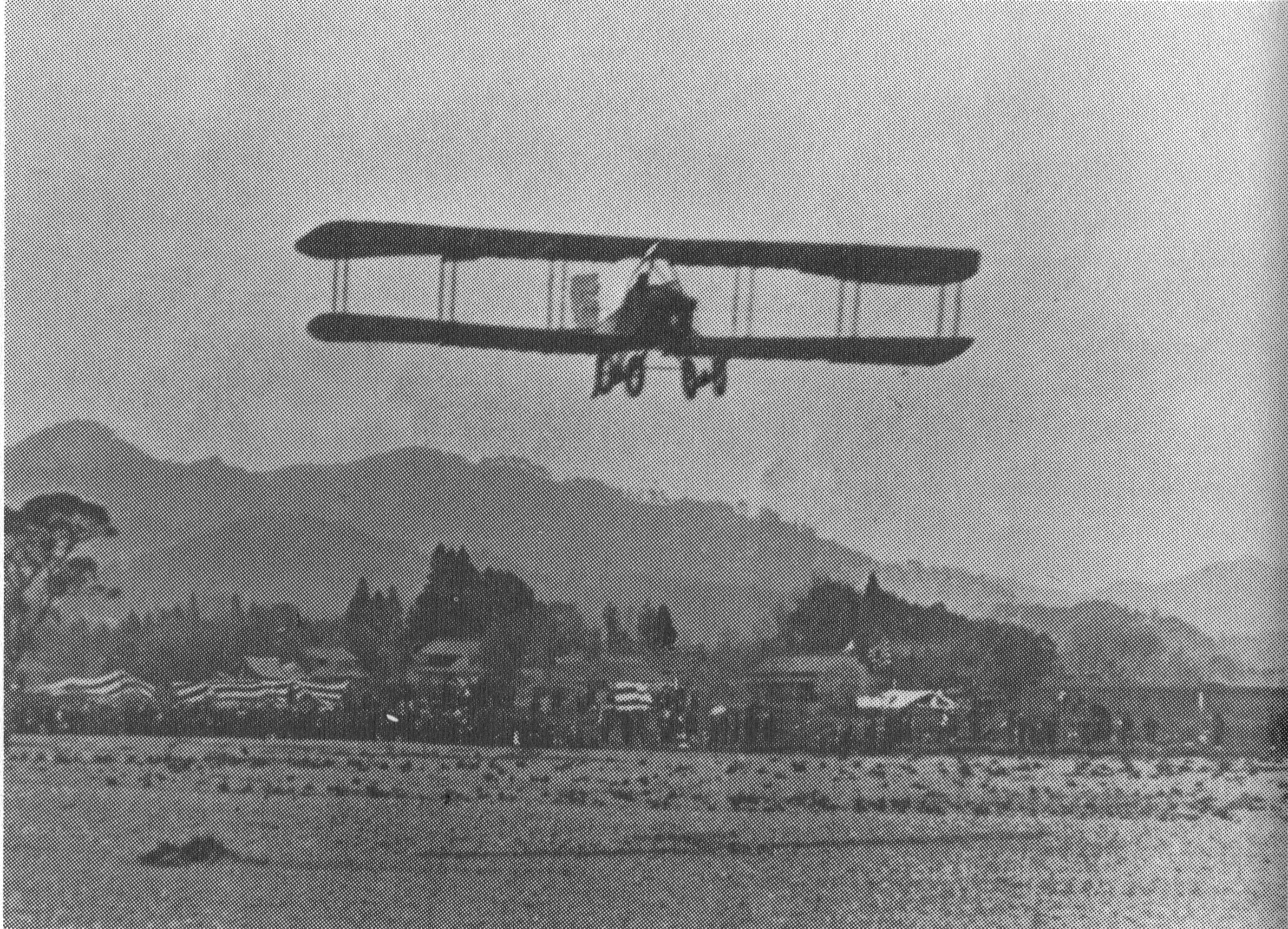
Ito-Emi type 1

In November 1915, Itô finished construction of an airplane named after himself and his hometown, the “Itô-Emi Type 1.” On January 8, 1916, Itô flew his aircraft over Tokyo, making him famous among Japanese aviators. After Itô’s aircraft facility suffered severe damage from winds and flooding in late September 1917, he moved his operation to Tsunanuma-chô (now Naraishino City), and reestablished his business under the name “Itô Aircraft Manufacturing.” Among the pilots that Itô trained was Tadashi Hyōdō, the first Japanese woman to earn her pilot’s license, and Inoue Chôichi, who established the Japan Air Freight Corporation.

When the Asahi News Corporation established the Tôsai Teiki Airlines in 1923, Itô Aircraft Manufacturing provided both aircraft and pilots, thereby contributing to civil aviation transportation. In 1930, Itô established the Japan Light Aircraft Club and appointed Sanji Narahara as club president, which contributed to the spread of lighter-than-air aircraft in Japan.

Although Itô was one of the few successful aviators to come from a purely civil aviation background, he withdrew from the world of aviation following the ban on all aviation activities from the GHQ after the Occupation of Japan. Itô established a farming cooperative with volunteers drawn from the former workers at his factory in 1948, and moved to Tôyama Village in Chiba Prefecture (now Tôhô, Narita City) to open up new farmland as part of the post-war land reclamation project.

Despite the great effort expended by Itô’s group to cultivate land that had once been bamboo forest, their farm was eventually included in the area designated for the Tokyo International Airport (now Narita International Airport). The sudden announcement of this plan was devastating for many local residents, some of whom participated in the Sanrizuka Struggle, but it was said that Itô alone of all the area’s residents welcomed the arrival of the airport. Although he had put his energy into farming, Itô willingly agreed to sell his land, and was among the first to sign a contract with the airport organization.

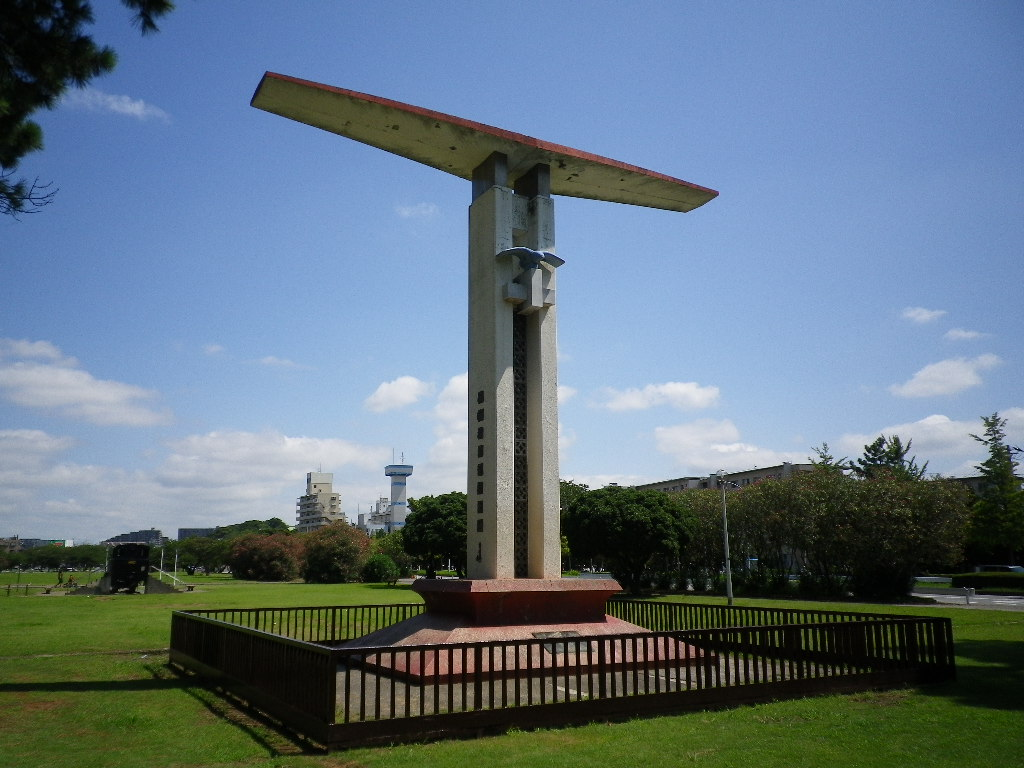
Memorial to the birthplace of civil aviation

Afterwards, Itô put his energy into the establishment of the Civil Aviation Memorial in Inage Seaside Park. The journals and written records that Itô left behind were eventually used by author Hiragi Kunio. On December 26, 1971, Itô died at the age of 80.
