= Milonov =

Milonov, or Milonoff (masculine, Russian: Милонов) or Milonova (feminine, Russian: Милонова) is a Russian-language surname

- Eero Milonoff (born 1980), Finnish actor
- Vitaly Milonov (born 1974), Russian politician
- Yuri Milonov (1895–1980), Bolshevik activist and educationalist
