= Armando Massiglia =

Italian footballer (1911-1980)

Personal information
- Date of birth: 6 January 1911
- Place of birth: Novi Ligure, Italy
- Date of death: 18 April 1980 (aged 69)
- Place of death: Novi Ligure, Italy
- Position: Right winger

Senior career*
Years	Team	Apps	(Gls)
192?–1930	Acciaierie e Ferriere		
1930–1931	Ambrosiana	3	(0)
1931–1935	Bari	56	(5)
1933–1934	→ Novara (loan)	21	(4)
1935–1936	Vigevanesi	34	(6)
1936–1940	Alessandria	96	(21)
1940–1943	Derthona		
- * Club domestic league appearances and goals

Armando Massiglia (6 January 1911 – 28 April 1980) was an Italian professional footballer active in the 1930s who played as a right winger. He made 65 Serie A appearances for Ambrosiana, Bari and Alessandria, and a further 145 appearances in Serie B.

== Life and career ==
Armando Massiglia was born on 6 January 1911 in Novi Ligure, Piedmont. He played for his home-town club, Acciaierie e Ferriere, before joining Serie A club Ambrosiana in 1930. Massiglia made his first-team debut on 4 November at home to Brescia, playing on the right wing of an Ambrosiana side weakened by the absence of several regulars. Although La Stampa's reporter thought his performance in the 3–3 draw showed promise, he appeared only twice more for the first team, his failure to progress attributed to a lack of drive, and moved on to another top-flight club, Bari, at the end of the season.

He played regularly in his first season at Bari, but his team finished level on points with Brescia, whom they had to beat in a play-off to avoid relegation to Serie B. Brescia took an early lead, and Bari equalised in the second half. With five minutes left, Massiglia ran the ball down the wing until level with the penalty area and passed to the unmarked Dario Gay who scored the goal that kept Bari in the top flight. He played in the first few matches of the following season, but then lost his place. Unlike the previous season, Bari did not escape relegation.

Massiglia spent the 1933–34 season on loan to Novara, where his military service commitments allowed him time to make 21 Serie B appearances and score four goals, before returning to his parent club. He played in 20 of their 28 league matches to help the side regain their top-flight status as section winners, and two minutes into the match, scored the only goal of the championship play-off first leg against Genova 1893, winners of the other section; Bari lost the second leg 4–0 so did not win the overall title.

He spent the 1935–36 season with another Serie B club, Vigevanesi, for whom he was ever-present as they were relegated, and his performances earned him a return to Serie A, with Alessandria. In style, he was technically gifted, a skilled dribbler and a good reader of the game, but he had a diffident personality and what was perceived as a lack of competitive spirit. Playing alongside the combative Eligio Vecchi and Luciano Robotti at Alessandria helped him produce his most effective work. Alessandria were relegated to Serie B for the 1937–38 campaign, and Massiglia stayed with the club for that and the next two seasons, before finishing his career in amateur football during the Second World War.

Massiglia died in his native Novi Ligure on 28 April 1980 at the age of 69.
