= Stadio Costante Girardengo =

Football stadium in Alessandria province, Italy

Coordinates: 44°46′06″N 08°46′58″E

- Interactive map of Stadio Costante Girardengo
- Location: Via Francesco Crispi, 27; Novi Ligure (Province of Alessandria)
- Owner: Municipality of Nova Ligure
- Capacity: 3,500
- Field size: 107m x 68m

Construction
- Opened: 1966
- Renovated: 2013

Tenants
- Novese; Comollo Novi (Prima Categoria) until 2010; Aquanera Comollo Novi (Serie D) 2010–2011

Stadio Costante Girardengo is a football stadium located in Novi Ligure, Italy. It is the home to the Novese, currently competing in Serie D. It opened in 1966 and holds 3,500 spectators.

It is named after Costante Girardengo, an Italian professional road bicycle racer.

In the past, it has been also the home of Comolli Novi before the fusion with Aquanera and Aquanera Comollo Novi until its radiation.
