= Hyōdō =

Hyōdō (written: 兵藤) is a Japanese surname. Notable people with the surname include:

- Akihiro Hyodo (born 1982), Japanese footballer
- Mako Hyōdō (born 1962), Japanese voice actress
- Shingo Hyodo (born 1985), footballer
- Tadashi Hyōdō (1899–1980), first Japanese woman aviator licensed in Japan
