= ASD Aquanera Comollo Novi =

Italian football club

Aquanera Comollo Novi
- Full name: Associazione Sportiva Dilettantistica Aquanera Comollo Novi
- Founded: 2010
- Dissolved: 2011
- Ground: Stadio Costante Girardengo, Novi Ligure, Italy
- Capacity: 3,500
- 2011–12: Serie D/A, radiated
Home colours	Away colours

Associazione Sportiva Dilettantistica Aquanera Comollo Novi was an Italian association football club, based in Novi Ligure, Piedmont.

== History ==
The club was founded in 2010 after the merger of A.S.D. Aquanera (founded in 2001 in Basaluzzo and also representing the nearby town of Fresonara, with a 10th final position in the 2009–10 Serie D as a last result) and Comollo Novi (founded in Novi Ligure and playing in Prima Categoria Piedmont and Aosta Valley).

=== The radiation ===
On 15 December 2011 the club was excluded by the National Disciplinary Committee from Serie D and all Italian football for irregularities at registration.

== Colors and badge ==
The team's colors were white and blue.
