= Ernest William Latchford =

Ernest William Latchford MBE MC (1889–1962) was a distinguished Australian army officer with the rank of colonel, who served in World War I, on the Western Front, North West Persia, and uniquely for an Australian, also in Siberia during the Russian Civil War. He later went on to be train two further generations of Australian military leaders as Chief Instructor and later, Commanding Officer of the Australian Small Arms School. He was awarded the Military Cross for his leadership during the Battle of Passchendaele in 1917 and later, became a Member of the British Empire (MBE). Latchford Barracks, outside Albury, NSW, is named in recognition of his service to the Australian military.

== Early life ==
Ern Latchford was born on 27 January 1889 in a wooden slab hut beside the Goulburn Weir in Central Victoria, to Richard and Ada (née Doran) Latchford. His paternal grandfather migrated from Ireland in the 1850s, while his maternal grandparents arrived in Australia about the same time, but from England. His father was an itinerant stonemason and repeatedly left his family to find work through outback Australia, eventually being killed in an accident in 1901. At the age of about 3, Ern's mother recognised she was unable to raise her surviving son, as well as 5 six daughters, so Ern was raised by his uncle, William Latchford, first in Deniliquin, NSW and later in Launceston, Tasmania. At the age of 17, he moved to Melbourne where he found work as an assistant at the Coles Book Arcade. Soon after, he volunteered for the fledging Australian militia and by 1910, had decided to make the military his career, and joined full time as part of the Australian Government's plans to train a large part of the male population in defence tactics.

== World War One ==
Latchford volunteered to join the first waves of Australian soldiers leaving for the Middle East in late 1914, but due to his proven track record as a trainer, especially in small arms, he was held back to continue training those destined for Gallipoli and the Western Front. It was not until 1916 was he finally allowed to serve overseas when he was appointed a second lieutenant with the 38th Battalion being formed out of Bendigo. On 20 June 1916, he and the 38th left Port Melbourne and sailed to England, via Cape Town and Cape Verde. From August through to November 1916, the 38th Battalion trained at the Larkhill Camp on the Salisbury Plain, UK before embarking for France.

For the next 14 months, Ern saw action repeatedly along the Western Front and in particular, took part in the successful Battle of Messines in June 1917 and the disastrous Third Battle of Ypres (Passchendaele) the following November 1917. It was here, under appalling conditions, that Ern was awarded the Military Cross for his "conspicuous gallantry and devotion to duty, in reorganising the Battalion after it had suffered heavy casualties"

In late 1917, Latchford was selected as part of an elite group of Empire officers to serve on 'Dunsterforce', a semi-secret mission to be deployed to North West Persia, to block any attempt by Ottoman forces to reach India, but also to rescue and support Armenian and Assyrian communities under threat from Turkish forces. Latchford's specific mission was to train Armenian irregulars to act as guerilla fighters against the Turkish invaders or the new threat from Russian Bolshevik forces from the north.

Instead of returning in late 1918 once the armistices were signed. Latchford volunteered as the only Australian to serve on the British-led Knox mission to assist the White Russian forces in Siberia, fighting the Red Armies of Lenin and Trotsky. After a long sea voyage via India, Singapore, Hong Kong and Japan, Latchford crossed Manchuria and eventually was based in Irkutsk for much of 1919. Here, he trained a disparete collection of officers, volunteers and conscripts at former Imperial military schools and also on summer rifle range he designed deep in the Siberian forest. As the Red Army's reach expanded, and under political pressure around the world, the Mission was withdrawn in late 1919 and Latchford finally made his way home in early 1920.

== After World War One ==
On returning to Australia, Latchford was determined to stay within the Australian Army, despite its rapid reduction in size post-demobilisation. As such, he took a demotion back to Warrant Officer and was deployed to the School of Musketry which in turn became the Small Arms School. Apart from a 12 month posting to the UK in 1923, he continued his association with the School and the Australian Instructional Corps for the next 29 years, being promoted at various points until appointed Commanding Officer with the rank of colonel. The school was relocated to Bonegilla, near Albury -Wodonga during World War II and eventually to Seymour, Victoria. During World War II, Latchford was instrumental in investigating the merits of the Owen Gun and through his advocacy, it became a key part of the Australian infantry's weaponry. Latchford retired in 1949.

== Post-military career ==
After moving to Melbourne, Latchford became a Judge's Associate for the Victorian Supreme Court, a role he undertook through the 1950s. He died from a cerebral-haemorrhage on 20 November 1962, and his ashes were interred at Springvale, after a full military funeral.

== Personal life ==
Latchford became engaged to Linda Dehnert (1895–1976) of Ballan, Victoria, before embarking for France but they did not marry until May 1921 (in Ballarat). Their only child was Kevin William Latchford (1927–2013), who also pursued a military career, reaching the rank of major-general.

== Legacy ==
As well as the Latchford Barrack, which was opened in 1983, the Latchford Galleries at the Australian Infantry Museum Singleton, and Latchford Street in Theodore, Canberra, ACT, are named in recognition of Latchford's contributions to the Australian Army.
