= Longfellow School (Swissvale, Pennsylvania) =

- U.S. National Register of Historic Places
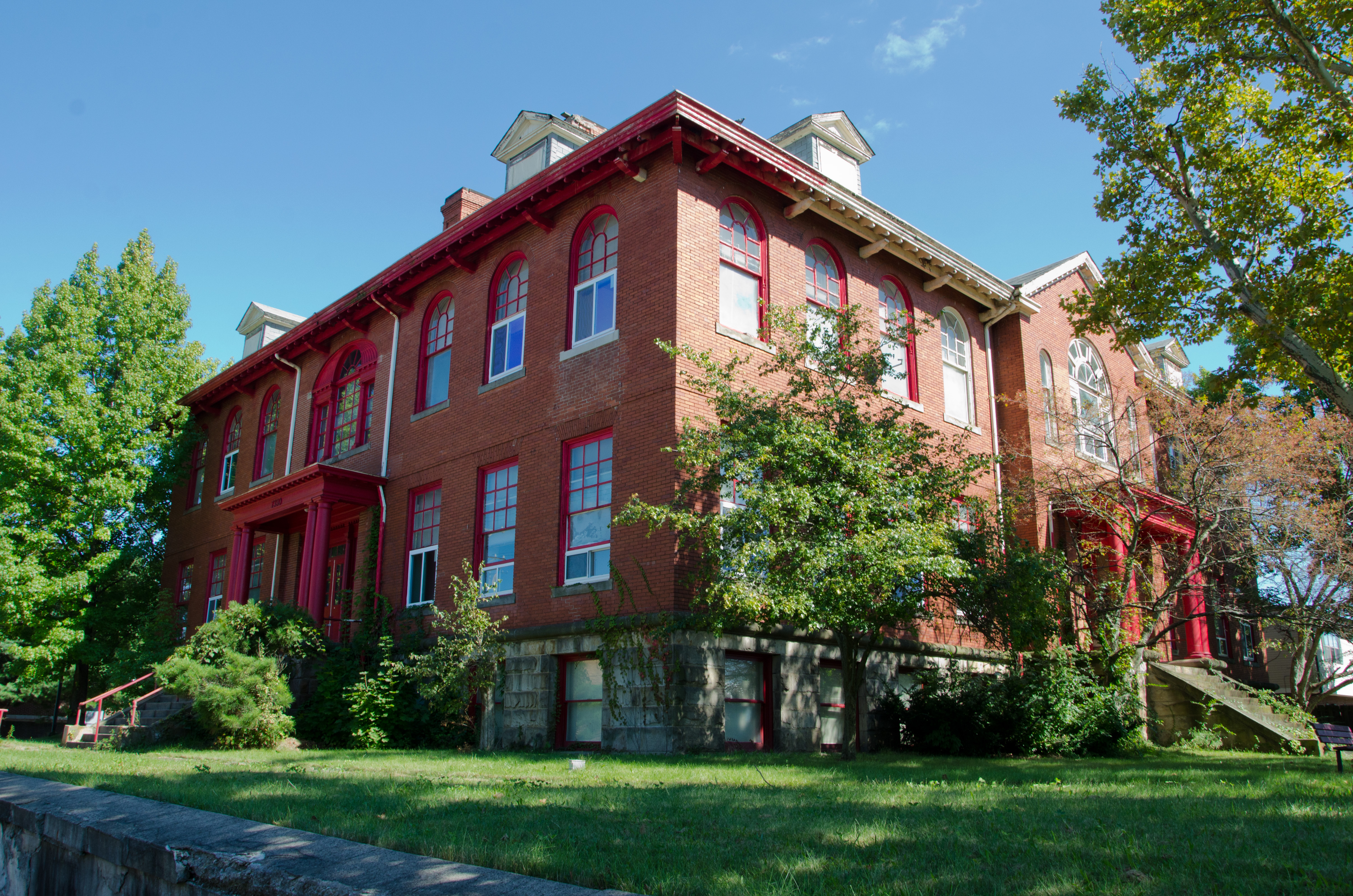

- Location within Pennsylvania Location within the United States
- Location: Monroe Street and McClure Avenue, Swissvale, Pennsylvania, USA
- Coordinates: 40°25′20.11″N 79°53′30.2″W
- Built: 1902
- Architect: George Hogg, Rieger & Courrier
- Architectural style: Classical Revival
- NRHP reference No.: 84003088
- Added to NRHP: June 28, 1984

The Longfellow School (also known as the Deniston School) is located at the corner of Monroe Street and McClure Avenue in Swissvale, Pennsylvania. Built in 1902, it was added to the National Register of Historic Places on June 28, 1984.

== History and architectural features ==
Erected in 1902, this historic building was in use as residential apartments until February 2012, when residents were evicted based on a determination by the Swissvale Fire Chief that the building had become uninhabitable.

It was added to the National Register of Historic Places on June 28, 1984.
