= Charles Edward Michael Terry =

Hong Kong businessman (1897–1980)

Charles Edward Michael Terry, CBE OStJ (1897 – 13 April 1980) was a Hong Kong businessman. He was an unofficial member of the Executive Council and Legislative Council of Hong Kong.

Terry was an appointed unofficial member of the Legislative Council of Hong Kong from 1950 to 1959. He was an unofficial member of the Executive Council of Hong Kong until he was succeeded by Richard Charles Lee on 28 May 1961. He was the president of the St. Patrick's Society of Hong Kong in 1941. In 1952, he became the founding commissioner of the Civil Aid Service, a civil organisation that assist in a variety of auxiliary emergency roles, and chairman of the Hong Kong St. John Ambulance in 1963.

He was awarded Officer and Commander of the Order of the British Empire (OBE and CBE) in 1955 and 1959 respectively for his public services in Hong Kong. In 1963, he was awarded Officer of the Order of the Hospital of St. John of Jerusalem. He died in Queensland, Australia in April 1980.
