= Swissvale, Pennsylvania =

Borough in Pennsylvania, US

- Borough
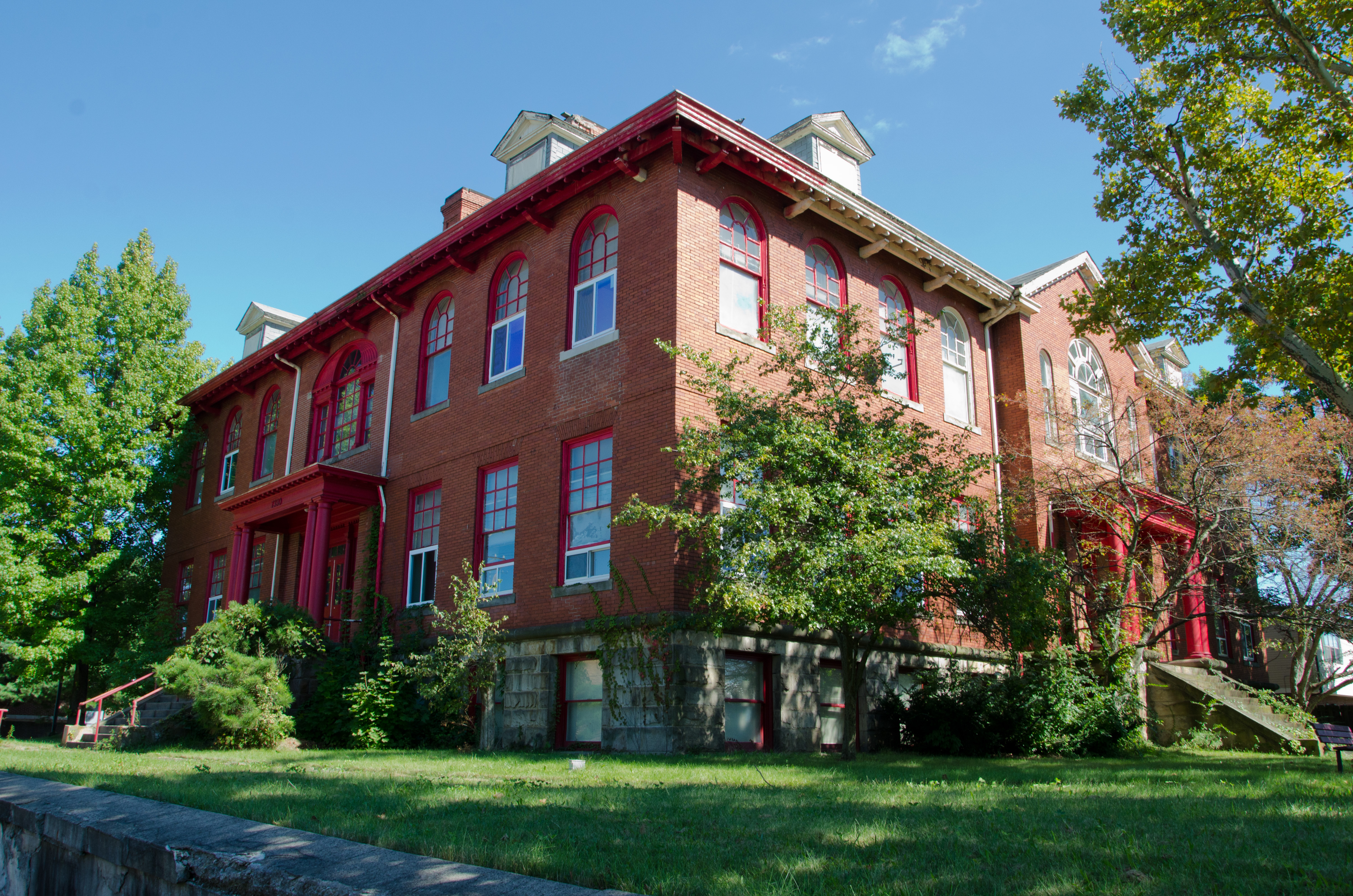
- Longfellow School (1902), National Register of Historic Places
- Interactive map of Swissvale, Pennsylvania
- Location within Pennsylvania Location within the United States
- Coordinates: 40°25′20″N 79°53′10″W
- Country: United States
- State: Pennsylvania
- County: Allegheny

Government
  - Mayor: Deneen Swartzwelder (D)

Area
  - Total: 1.24 sq mi (3.22 km^{2})
  - Land: 1.20 sq mi (3.11 km^{2})
  - Water: 0.042 sq mi (0.11 km^{2})

Population (2020)
  - Total: 8,624
  - Estimate (2021): 8,490
  - Density: 7,193.3/sq mi (2,777.35/km^{2})
- Time zone: UTC-5 (Eastern (EST))
  - Summer (DST): UTC-4 (EDT)
- ZIP codes: 15218
- Area code: 412
- FIPS code: 42-75816
- Website: swissvaleborough.com

Swissvale is a borough in Allegheny County, Pennsylvania, United States, 9 miles (14 km) east of downtown Pittsburgh. Named for a farmstead owned by James Swisshelm, during the industrial age it was the site of the Union Switch and Signal Company of George Westinghouse. The population was 8,624 at the 2020 census.

== History ==
Swissvale is named after the Swisshelm family. John Swisshelm (1752–1838), who owned a farm where the town is located. John Swisshelm served under General George Washington in the Revolutionary War, and camped at Valley Forge. Swisshelm married Mary Elizabeth Miller, and they had many children. Their son, James Swisshelm, married Jane Grey Cannon, noted abolitionist and political activist, Jane Swisshelm named the town Swissvale as the town overlooked the Monongahela River Valley. The Pittsburgh neighborhood of Swisshelm Park, adjacent to Swissvale, is named after John Swisshelm.

Since 1874, the Allegheny Car & Transportation Shops had provided well-paying jobs to local citizens and were later purchased by George Westinghouse, the President of Westinghouse Air Brake Company, who formed the Union Switch & Signal company and maintained that facility in Swissvale.

== Geography ==
Swissvale is located at 40°25′20″N 79°53′10″W (40.422304, −79.886185).

According to the United States Census Bureau, the borough has a total area of 1.3 square miles (3.4 km^{2}), of which 1.2 square miles (3.1 km^{2}) is land and 0.1 square miles (0.26 km^{2}), or 4.76%, is water.

=== Surrounding and adjacent communities ===
Swissvale has six land borders, including Edgewood to the north, Braddock Hills to the east, North Braddock to the southeast, Rankin to the south, and the Pittsburgh neighborhoods of Regent Square and Swisshelm Park to the west. (The area known as Regent Square also encompasses portions of Pittsburgh, Wilkinsburg, Edgewood, and Swissvale.) Directly across the Monongahela River to the southwest is the borough of Munhall.

== Demographics ==
Historical population
Census	Pop.	Note	%±
1900	1,716		—
1910	7,381		330.1%
1920	10,908		47.8%
1930	16,029		46.9%
1940	15,919		−0.7%
1950	16,488		3.6%
1960	15,089		−8.5%
1970	13,819		−8.4%
1980	11,345		−17.9%
1990	10,637		−6.2%
2000	9,653		−9.3%
2010	8,983		−6.9%
2020	8,624		−4.0%

As of the 2020 census, there were 8,624 people, 4,456 households, and 2,390 families residing in the borough. The population density was 8,052.0 inhabitants per square mile (3,108.9/km^{2}). There were 5,097 housing units at an average density of 4,251.6 per square mile (1,641.6/km^{2}). The racial makeup of the borough was 74.45% White, 22.14% African American, 0.11% Native American, 0.91% Asian, 0.06% Pacific Islander, 0.60% from other races, and 1.72% from two or more races. Hispanic or Latino of any race were 1.06% of the population.

There were 4,456 households, out of which 21.2% had children under the age of 18 living with them, 31.0% were married couples living together, 16.5% had a female householder with no husband present, and 48.9% were non-families. 42.0% of all households were made up of individuals, and 14.3% had someone living alone who was 65 years of age or older. The average household size was 2.06 and the average family size was 2.85.

In the borough the population was spread out, with 20.0% under the age of 18, 8.2% from 18 to 24, 31.7% from 25 to 44, 22.7% from 45 to 64, and 17.4% who were 65 years of age or older. The median age was 39 years. For every 100 females, there were 84.4 males. For every 100 females age 18 and over, there were 79.0 males.

The median income for a household in the borough was $31,523, and the median income for a family was $35,929. Males had a median income of $29,333 versus $25,184 for females. The per capita income for the borough was $19,216. About 14.1% of families and 15.3% of the population were below the poverty line, including 26.2% of those under age 18 and 10.4% of those age 65 or over.

== Government and politics ==
United States presidential election results for Swissvale, Pennsylvania
Year	Republican		Democratic		Third party(ies)	
Year	No.	%	No.	%	No.	%
2020	804	15.93%	4,203	83.26%	41	0.81%
2016	760	16.32%	3,817	81.98%	79	1.70%
2012	910	19.45%	3,700	79.08%	69	1.47%

=== Federal elections ===
Swissvale has voted for the Democratic party nominee overwhelmingly in the previous three general elections.

==== Federal representation ====
- Dave McCormick, U.S. Senator from Pennsylvania (since 2025)
- John Fetterman, U.S. Senator from Pennsylvania (since 2023)
- Summer Lee, U.S. House of Representative from Pennsylvania's 12th district
- Chris Deluzio, U.S. House of Representative from Pennsylvania's 17th district

=== Local government ===
The borough has a mayoral local government. Deneen Swartzwelder (D) of the Democratic Party is the current mayor and has been since 2005; she is currently serving her fifth term.

Borough of Swissvale Council is made up of seven elected members, with each member serving a four-year term. Council elections are held in November every other year with newly elected officials sworn in the following January.

Michelle Naccarati-Chapkis represents Swissvale as a member of the Allegheny County Council from the 8th district.

=== Statewide representation ===
- Abigail Salisbury, Member of the Pennsylvania House of Representatives from the 34th district
- Jay Costa, Member of the Pennsylvania State Senate from the 43rd district

== Education ==
Swissvale is served by the Woodland Hills School District.

The comprehensive high school for the district is Woodland Hills High School.

== Transportation ==
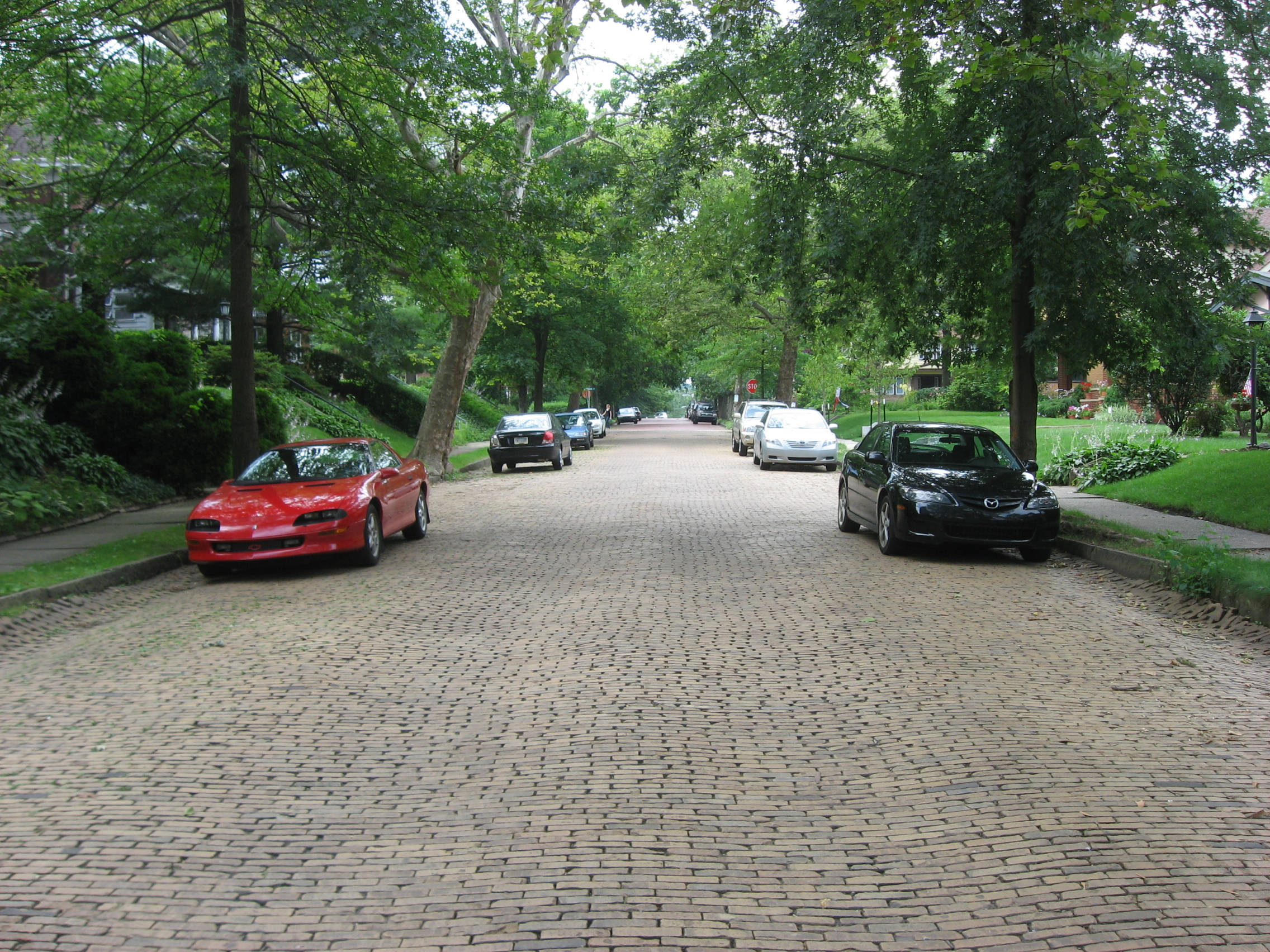
Neighborhood street in western Swissvale

Swissvale is served by the Roslyn and Swissvale stations on the Martin Luther King Jr. East Busway.

== Notable people ==
- Shirley Burkovich, woman's professional baseball player in AAGPBL, birthplace (1933–2022)
- David Conrad, actor
- Frank Conrad, creator of KDKA Radio (KDKA-AM & KDKA-FM); lived In Swissvale borough 1910-15 conducting transmission experiments
- William B. Dickson, steel industry executive and labor policy reformer
- Michael F. Doyle, congressman
- Bobby Epps, NFL player for the New York Giants
- Billy Gardell, actor
- Dick Groat, baseball player for Pittsburgh Pirates and All-American college basketball player
- Agnes Christine Johnston, screenwriter
- Summer Lee, politician
- Esther Silveus, radiologist
- Vladimir K. Zworykin, television inventor

Preceded by West Homestead	Bordering communities of Pittsburgh	Succeeded by Edgewood
