= List of Serie B champions and promotions =

Serie B champions and promotions since its establishment, including the competition under previous names, are as follows:

== Promotions by season ==
- Italics denotes teams promoted after playoff or qualification match.
- Parentheses denote teams not promoted.

=== Seconda Divisione ===
Season	Winners	Eventual other promotions
1922–23	(Biellese)	
1923–24	Derthona	Reggiana and Mantova
1924–25	Udinese	Parma
1925–26	none	

=== Prima Divisione ===
Season	Winners	Eventual other promotions
1926–27	Novara	Pro Patria, Reggiana, Lazio
1927–28	Atalanta	Biellese, Pistoiese, Bari and Venezia, Fiumana, Triestina, Legnano, Prato, Fiorentina

=== Serie B ===
Season	Winners	Runners-up	Third place	Eventual other promotions
1929–30	Casale	Legnano	(La Dominante)	–
1930–31	Fiorentina	Bari	(Palermo)	–
1931–32	Palermo	Padova	(Hellas Verona)	–
1932–33	Livorno	Brescia	(Modena)	–
1933–34	Sampierdarenese	(Bari)	(Modena)	–
1934–35	Genova 1893	Bari	–	–
1935–36	Lucchese	Novara	(Livorno)	–
1936–37	Livorno	Atalanta	(Modena)	–
1937–38	Modena (Note: Modena and Novara both awarded champions.)	Novara (Note: Modena and Novara both awarded champions.)	(Alessandria)	–
1938–39	Fiorentina	Venezia	(Atalanta)	–
1939–40	Atalanta	Livorno	(Lucchese)	–
1940–41	Liguria	Modena	(Brescia)	–
1941–42	Bari	Vicenza	(Pescara)	–
1942–43	Modena	Brescia	(Napoli)	–
1945–46	Alessandria	(Pro Patria)	(Vigevano)	Napoli (Note: 1945–46 Serie A-B Southern Italy co-champions.)
1946–47	Northern winner	Central winner	Southern winner	–
1946–47	Pro Patria	Lucchese	Salernitana	–
1947–48	Novara	Padova	Palermo	–
1947–48	Winners	Runners-up	Third place	–
1948–49	Como	Venezia	(Vicenza)	–
1949–50	Napoli	Udinese	(Legnano)	–
1950–51	SPAL	Legnano	(Modena)	–
1951–52	Roma	(Brescia)	(Messina)	–
1952–53	Genoa	Legnano	(Catania)	–
1953–54	Catania	Pro Patria	(Cagliari)	–
1954–55	Lanerossi Vicenza	Padova	(Modena)	–
1955–56	Udinese	Palermo	(Como)	–
1956–57	Hellas Verona	Alessandria	(Brescia)	–
1957–58	Triestina	Bari	(Venezia)	–
1958–59	Atalanta	Palermo	(Lecco)	–
1959–60	Torino	Lecco	Catania	–
1960–61	Venezia	Ozo Mantova	Palermo	–
1961–62	Genoa	Napoli	Modena	–
1962–63	Messina	Bari	Lazio	–
1963–64	Varese	Cagliari	Foggia	–
1964–65	Brescia	Napoli	SPAL	–
1965–66	Venezia	Lecco	Mantova	–
1966–67	Sampdoria	Varese	(Catanzaro)	–
1967–68	Palermo	Hellas Verona	Pisa	–
1968–69	Lazio	Brescia	Bari	–
1969–70	Varese	Foggia	Catania	–
1970–71	Mantova	Atalanta	Catanzaro	–
1971–72	Ternana	Lazio	Palermo	–
1972–73	Genoa	Cesena	Foggia	–
1973–74	Varese	Ascoli	Ternana	–
1974–75	Perugia	Como	Hellas Verona	–
1975–76	Genoa	Catanzaro	Foggia	–
1976–77	Lanerossi Vicenza	Atalanta	Pescara	–
1977–78	Ascoli	Catanzaro	Avellino	–
1978–79	Udinese	Cagliari	Pescara	–
1979–80	Como	Pistoiese	Brescia	–
1980–81	Milan	Genoa	Cesena	–
1981–82	Hellas Verona	Pisa	Sampdoria	–
1982–83	Milan	Lazio	Catania	–
1983–84	Atalanta	Como	Cremonese	–
1984–85	Pisa	Lecce	Bari	–
1985–86	Ascoli	Brescia	(Lanerossi Vicenza)	Empoli
1986–87	Pescara	Pisa	Cesena	–
1987–88	Bologna	Lecce	Lazio	Atalanta
1988–89	Genoa	Bari	Udinese	Cremonese
1989–90	Torino	Pisa	Cagliari	Parma
1990–91	Foggia	Hellas Verona	Cremonese	Ascoli
1991–92	Brescia	Pescara	Ancona	Udinese
1992–93	Reggiana	Cremonese	Piacenza	Lecce
1993–94	Fiorentina	Bari	Brescia	Padova
1994–95	Piacenza	Udinese	Vicenza	Atalanta
1995–96	Bologna	Hellas Verona	Perugia	Reggiana
1996–97	Brescia	Empoli	Lecce	Bari
1997–98	Salernitana	Venezia	Cagliari	Perugia
1998–99	Hellas Verona	Torino	Reggina	Lecce
1999–2000	Vicenza	Atalanta	Brescia	Napoli
2000–01	Torino	Piacenza	Chievo	Venezia
2001–02	Como	Modena	Reggina	Empoli
2002–03	Siena	Sampdoria	Lecce	Ancona
2003–04	Palermo	Cagliari	Livorno	Messina, Atalanta, Fiorentina (Note: Due to expansion from 18 teams to 20 teams of Serie A.)
2004–05	Empoli	(Torino)	(Perugia)	Treviso, Ascoli
2005–06	Atalanta	Catania	Torino	–
2006–07	Juventus	Napoli	Genoa	–
2007–08	Chievo	Bologna	Lecce	–
2008–09	Bari	Parma	Livorno	–
2009–10	Lecce	Cesena	Brescia	–
2010–11	Atalanta	Siena	Novara	–
2011–12	Pescara	Torino	(Sassuolo)	Sampdoria
2012–13	Sassuolo	Hellas Verona	Livorno	–
2013–14	Palermo	Empoli	(Latina)	Cesena (defunct)
2014–15	Carpi	Frosinone	(Vicenza)	Bologna
2015–16	Cagliari	Crotone	(Trapani)	Pescara
2016–17	SPAL	Hellas Verona	(Frosinone)	Benevento
2017–18	Empoli	Parma	Frosinone	–
2018–19	Brescia (defunct)	Lecce	(Benevento)	Hellas Verona
2019–20	Benevento	Crotone	Spezia	–
2020–21	Empoli	Salernitana	(Monza)	Venezia
2021–22	Lecce	Cremonese	(Pisa)	Monza
2022–23	Frosinone	Genoa	(Bari)	Cagliari
2023–24	Parma	Como	Venezia	–
2024–25	Sassuolo	Pisa	(Spezia)	Cremonese
2025–26	Venezia	Frosinone	Monza	–
