= Eligio Vecchi =

Italian footballer (1910-1968)

- Vecchi with Milan in 1934

Personal information
- Date of birth: 16 February 1910
- Place of birth: Mantua, Italy
- Date of death: 8 November 1968 (aged 58)
- Place of death: Mantua, Italy
- Position: Forward

Senior career*
Years	Team	Apps	(Gls)
1927–1929	Mantova	43	(13)
1929–1931	Foggia	43	(12)
1931–1932	Mantova	24	(11)
1932–1934	Cremonese	53	(17)
1934–1936	Ambrosiana-Inter	29	(4)
1936–1938	Alessandria	50	(12)
1938–1939	Fiorentina	18	(5)
1939–1940	Atalanta	6	(2)
1940–1942	Mantova	9	(5)
1942–1943	Cavese	3	(0)
1946–1947	Mantova	1	(0)
Total		279	(81)
- * Club domestic league appearances and goals

Eligio Vecchi (16 February 1910 – 8 November 1968) was an Italian professional footballer who played as a midfielder.

== Career ==
Vecchi began his career at local club Mantova in 1927, before joining Foggia two seasons later in the Serie B. Following a few seasons with Cremonese, Vecchi played two friendlies for Milan in May 1934, against Admira Wien and Manchester City. He joined Ambrosiana-Inter, Milan's rivals, in the Serie A, scoring four goals in 29 games in his two seasons at the club.

He was sold to Alessandria in 1936 where, despite being relegated to the Serie B, Vecchi remained at the club. Alessandria failed to gain promotion, and Vecchi moved to Fiorentina in 1938, who had just been relegated from the Serie A. Vecchi then played for Atalanta, Mantova, and Cavese, before being forced to fight in the ongoing World War II. He returned to play for Mantova ahead of the 1946–47 season, where he retired.

== Playing style ==
Vecchi was a forward with good technique, capable of playing both as a centre-forward and as a wide midfielder, though his main position was that of a winger.

== Honours ==
Fiorentina

- Serie B: 1938–39

Atalanta

- Serie B: 1939–40
