= Ambrose Flack =

American novelist

Ambrose J. Flack (March 16, 1902 – April 1, 1980) was an American novelist and short story writer best known for writing the short story "The Strangers That Came To Town".

From the 1930s to 1969, Flack wrote stories and articles for The Saturday Evening Post, The New Yorker, and other publications. He also authored a teleplay, Make Way for Teddy, and two novels, Family on the Hill (1945) and Room for Mr. Roosevelt (1951).

== The Strangers That Came to Town ==
Flack's signature achievement, "The Strangers That Came to Town" was an early literary examination of bigotry and prejudice in small-town America that pre-dated the similarly themed To Kill a Mockingbird. Narrated by a young boy named Andy, the story follows the Duvitch family, Croatian immigrants whose physical appearance the narrator immediately marks as both "foreign" and poor. Though sicknesses typical of the period (typhoid, whooping cough, measles) and dire poverty afflict the family, they remain kind, optimistic, and surprisingly generous.

The townspeople, however, have trouble looking beyond appearances. They harangue the Duvitch siblings, taunting them for everything from "the leaf, lard and black bread sandwiches they ate for lunch" to the "rag pickers’ clothes" they wear to school.

After the narrator Andy and his brother Tom poison some fish the Duvitches have caught, making them inedible, their father forces the boys to confess and administers punishment, part of which is facing their victims and owning up to their crime. "Father" goes a step further that ultimately eases the tension around the entire community. "It is high time," Tom and I heard Father say calmly, sanely, to Mother around noon next day when we woke up, "for this senseless feeling against the Duvitches to stop and I'm willing to do still more to stop it. Tonight we are having supper with them."

In time, the townspeople gradually accept the new arrivals, and the story ends on a note of unexpected generosity.

"On a cold snowy afternoon in winter Mr. Duvitch stopped at our house and presented Father (who had enormous hands, much bigger than any of the Duvitches') with a handsome pair of leather mittens, lined with fur, which had a slightly acrid ashy odor. 'No doubt one of the boys resurrected them from a heap of ashes in the dump,' remarked Father, drawing on the mittens, which fitted perfectly. 'Why should I value them any the less? Who would have dreamed that the Duvitches would have so much more to offer us than we have to offer them?'"

The story was so popular, it was dramatized in a 1959 television episode of the Loretta Young Show.

== Flack and Theodore Roosevelt ==
Flack reportedly idolized President Theodore Roosevelt, writing the novel Room for Mr. Roosevelt and the teleplay based on it, Make Way for Teddy; and a brief memoir for The New Yorker, Theodore Roosevelt And My Green-Gold Fountain Pen In the story, a 13-year-old Flack sees Roosevelt watching birds in a Syracuse, New York park, where Flack loses his green-gold fountain pen. He later sees Roosevelt in the local courthouse and also spies his pen—in the former President's pocket. Flack never musters the courage to ask for its return, instead visualizing the pen signing important documents.

Roosevelt's biographers often cite the unusual story, including Colonel Roosevelt author Edmund Morris, who called it an "enchanting reminiscence."

== Personal life ==
Little has been recorded or written about Flack's personal life. He was born in Syracuse, New York, and wrote about poverty in that part of the country, most notably in stories about the fictional Otter Family.

He was an avid gardener who developed a long relationship with Katharine Sergeant Angell White, a founding editor of The New Yorker.

Flack died in the Bronx, New York at age 78.
