= Maria Dietz =

German politician (1894–1980)

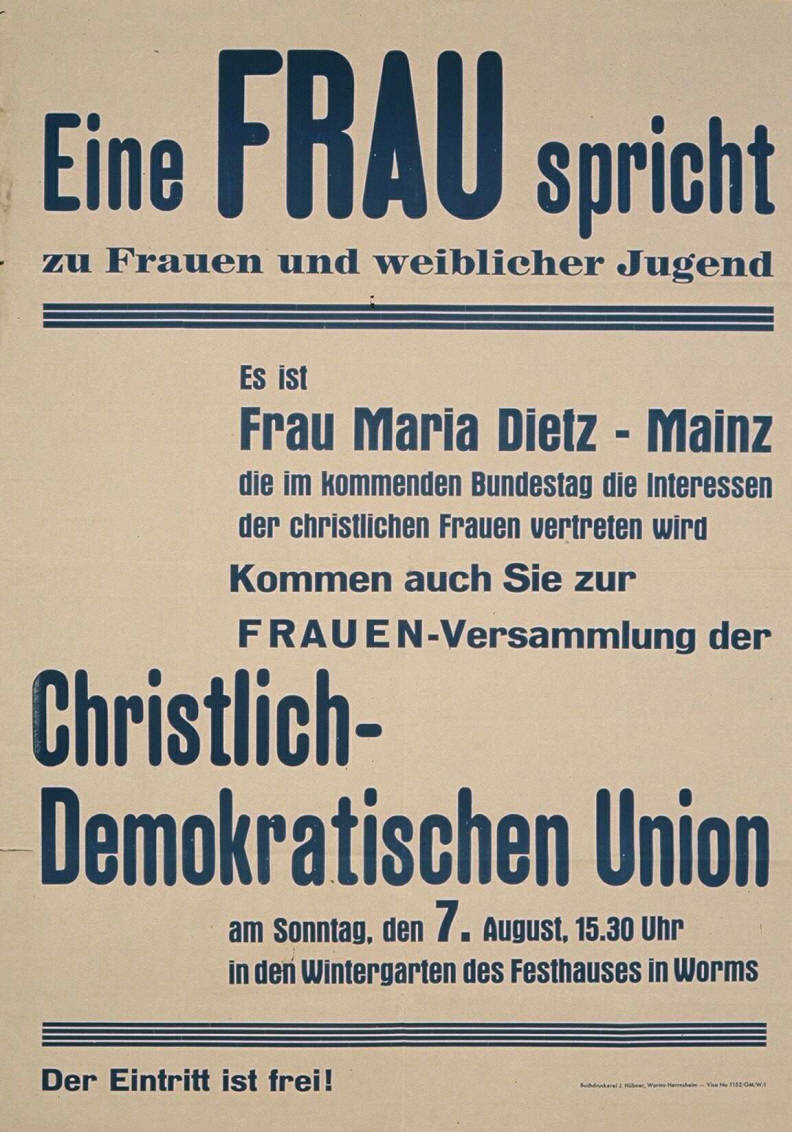
- Announcement poster for a CDU women's assembly with Maria Dietz on the occasion of the 1949 federal elections

Member of the Bundestag
- In office 7 September 1949 – 6 October 1957

Personal details
- Born: 7 February 1894 Düsseldorf
- Died: 12 April 1980 (aged 86) Mainz, Rhineland-Palatinate, Germany
- Party: CDU

Maria Dietz (7 February 1894 – 12 April 1980) was a German politician of the Christian Democratic Union (CDU) and former member of the German Bundestag.

== Life ==
Dietz was a member of the German Bundestag for two terms from 7 September 1949 to 6 October 1957. She was elected via the state list of the CDU in Rhineland-Palatinate.

== Literature ==
Herbst, Ludolf; Jahn, Bruno (2002). Vierhaus, Rudolf (ed.). Biographisches Handbuch der Mitglieder des Deutschen Bundestages. 1949–2002 [Biographical Handbook of the Members of the German Bundestag. 1949–2002] (in German). München: De Gruyter - De Gruyter Saur. p. 1715. ISBN 978-3-11-184511-1.
