= Jageshwar Prasad Khalish =

Indian politician (1894–1980)

Khalish Jageshwar Prasad Khalish
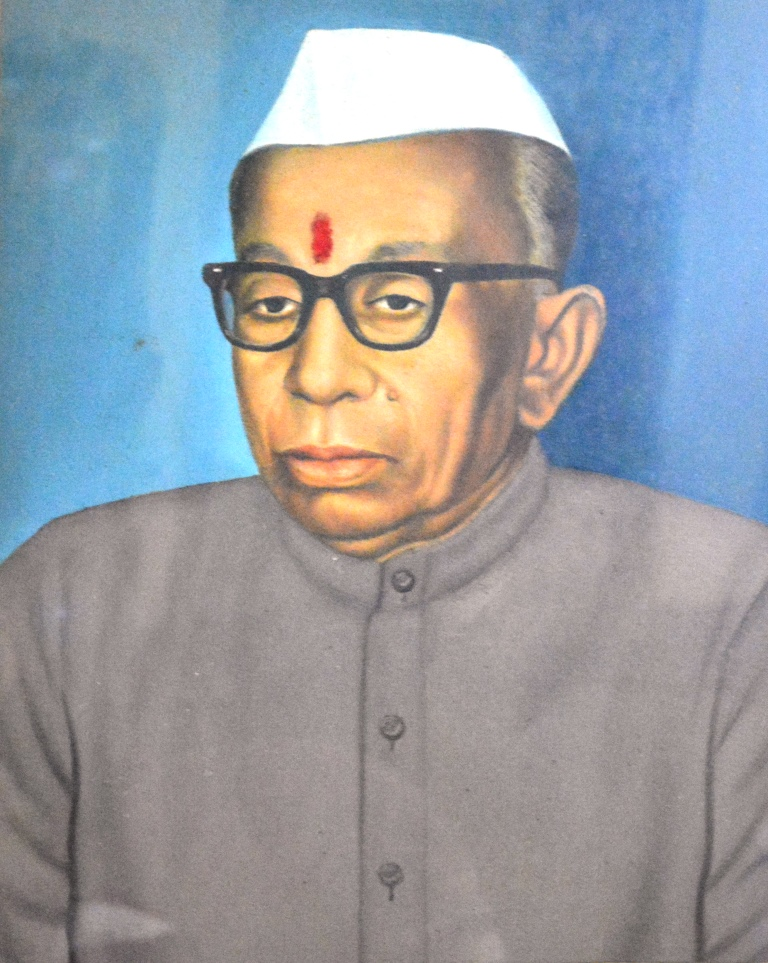

Personal details
- Born: 8 November 1894 Nadra, Gaya, Bihar, Bengal Presidency, British India (now in Bihar)
- Died: 27 April 1980 (aged 85) Gaya, Bihar, India
- Party: Indian National Congress
- Spouse: Sarswati Devi
- Parent: Kashinath Prasad

Jageshwar Prasad Khalish (8 November 1894 – 27 April 1980) was an Indian Shayar and politician from Gaya, Bihar. He joined the Indian National Congress in 1916, and from 1931 to 1934 presided over the Gaya Congress Committee. Khalish participated in the Quit India Movement. After Independence Day, he was elected to the Bihar Legislative Assembly in 1952, and from 1960 to 1972, he served as the member of Bihar Legislative Council. Khalish Park in Gaya was established in the name of Jageshwar Prasad Khalish in 1947 which was known to be Davis Park before Independence.

== Biography ==
=== Early life ===
Jageshwar Prasad Khalish was born on 8 November 1894 in the village of Nadra, Khizarsarai Block, Gaya, Bihar to the family of Kashinath and was named "Jageshwar Prasad". The title of "Khalish" was awarded to him by his teacher Khwaja Ishrat Lucknowi because of his Shayaris.

=== Student life ===
Being from a poor family he was unable to go any school for his higher studies, thus he did his basic schooling from Madrasa. He self-taught himself Hindi, Urdu, English, and Arthashastra.
Students have done their Doctor of Philosophy on Jageshwar Prasad Khalish in Urdu and modern history course studies.

== Shayari's ==
"मिटाकर दुश्मनो की शान अपनी शान रखेंगे
बदन से जान जाएगी वतन की आन रखेंगे"

मिटाता नहीं है जौहरे जाती कभी 'खलिश'|
काँटों के बीच रहके भी खंदा गुलाब है||

== Political career ==
In 1952 he was elected as M.L.A from Barachatti, Gaya, Bihar area. He won the election with a large margin leading to Forfeiture of Deposit of other leaders. From 1960 to 1972 he was member of Bihar Legislative Council. During his political career he established Gandhi Mandap, Gandhi Maidan in Gaya City.
