= Phil McQueen =

Australian rules footballer

Personal information
- Full name: James Phillip McQueen
- Born: 3 June 1895; Portarlington, Victoria
- Died: 24 April 1980 (aged 84); Heidelberg, Victoria

Playing career^{1}
Years	Club	Games (Goals)
1920	Geelong	2 (1)
- ^{1} Playing statistics correct to the end of 1920.

James Phillip McQueen (3 June 1895 – 24 April 1980) was an Australian rules footballer who played with Geelong in the Victorian Football League (VFL).
