= Michel Delesalle =

French ice hockey player

Personal information
- Nationality: French
- Born: 22 December 1907; Buenos Aires, Argentina
- Died: 7 April 1980 (aged 72); Paris, France

Sport
- Sport: Ice hockey

Miguel "Michel" Delesalle (22 December 1907 – 7 April 1980) was a French ice hockey player. He competed in the men's tournament at the 1936 Winter Olympics.
