= John Mackie (footballer, born 1910) =

Scottish footballer

Personal information
- Date of birth: 3 January 1910
- Place of birth: Baillieston, Scotland
- Date of death: 20 April 1980 (aged 70)
- Place of death: Chryston, Scotland
- Height: 5 ft 10 in (1.78 m)
- Position: Centre half

Senior career*
| Years | Team | Apps | (Gls) |
- Hull City
| 1935–1938 | Bradford City | 91 | (7) |
| 1938–1939 | Chesterfield | 17 | (3) |
| 1941–1942 | Chesterfield (war guest) | 5 | (1) |
| Total | | 113 | (11) |
- * Club domestic league appearances and goals

John Mackie (3 January 1910 – 20 April 1980) was a Scottish professional footballer who played as a centre half.

== Career ==
Born in Baillieston, Mackie played for Hull City, Bradford City and Chesterfield. For Bradford City, he made 91 appearances in the Football League; he also made 8 FA Cup appearances. For Chesterfield, he made 17 appearances in the Football League, and five appearances as a war guest.

== Sources ==
- Frost, Terry (1988). Bradford City A Complete Record 1903-1988. Breedon Books Sport. ISBN 0-907969-38-0.
