= Homa Shaibany =

Iran's first female surgeon

Homa Shaibany (born in Tehran, Iran circa 1913), was Iran's first female surgeon.

In 1930, she received a scholarship to study medicine at London University and received a bachelor's degree in anatomy and morphology. She received her M.B.B.S. in 1939. She was licensed by the Royal College of Physicians in England.

She worked in England until 1948, when she returned to Iran. She established a hospital for the Red Cross.
