= Novi Ligure =

Novi Ligure Nêuve (Ligurian)
- Comune
- Città di Novi Ligure
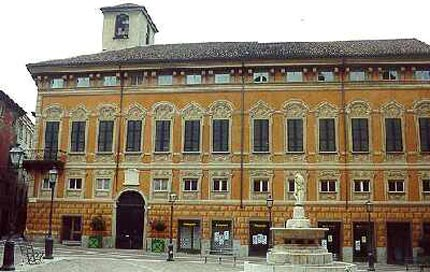
- Palazzo Delle Piane

- Flag Coat of arms

- Location within Italy Location within Piedmont
- Coordinates: 44°45′42″N 08°47′26″E
- Country: Italy
- Region: Piedmont
- Province: Alessandria (AL)
- Frazioni: Barbellotta, Cascinotti Contardino, Cascinotti Di Giacomo, Fornace Nuova, Località Quattrella, Località San Bovo, Merella

Government
  - Mayor: Rocchino Muliere

Area
  - Total: 55.19 km^{2} (21.31 sq mi)
- Elevation: 197 m (646 ft)

Population (1 January 2021)
  - Total: 27,786
  - Density: 503.5/km^{2} (1,304/sq mi)
- Demonym: Novese(i)
- Time zone: UTC+1 (CET)
  - Summer (DST): UTC+2 (CEST)
- Postal code: 15067
- Dialing code: 0143
- Patron saint: Madonna of the Snow
- Saint day: August 5
- Website: Official website

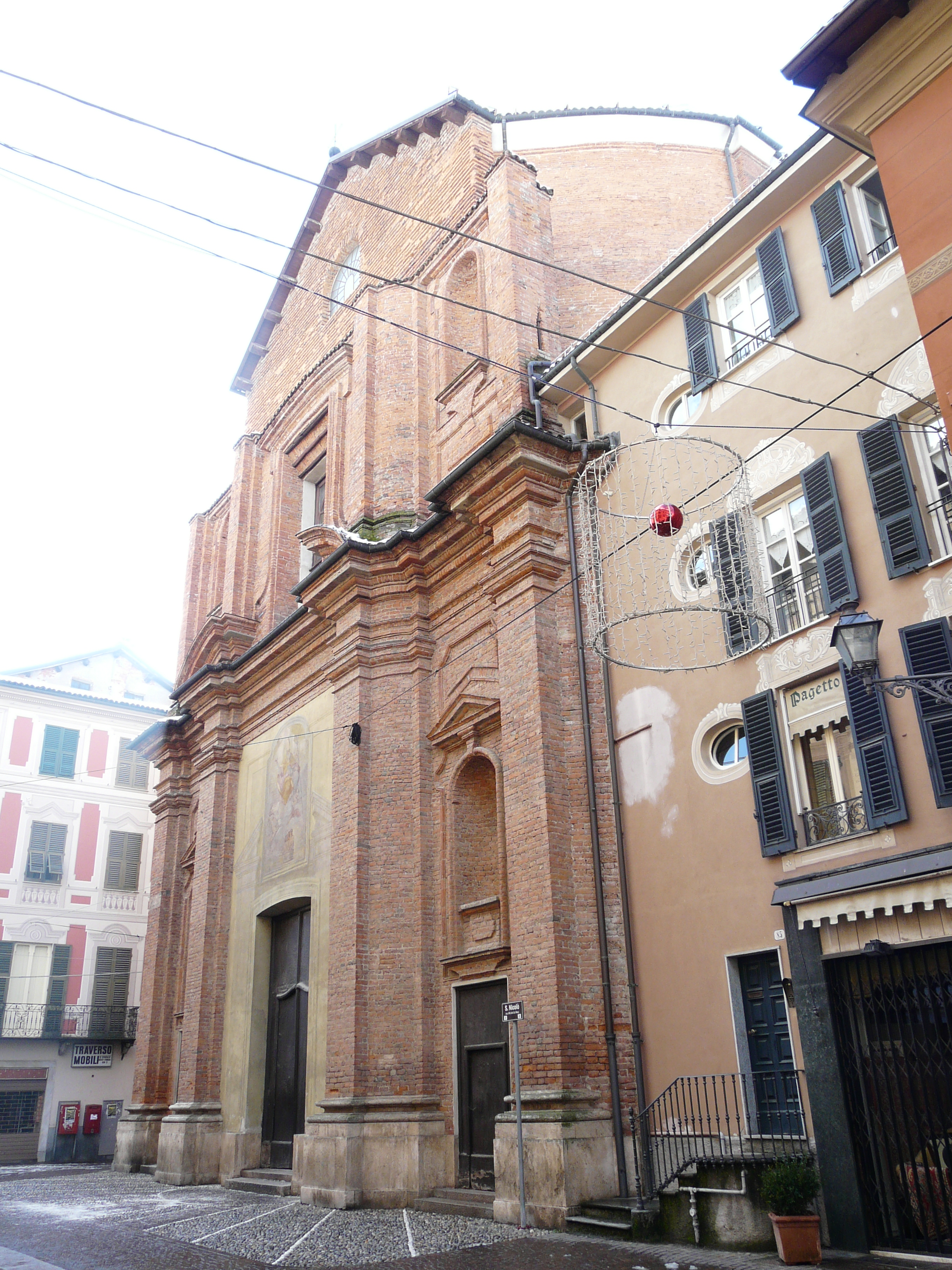
Church of San Nicolò

Novi Ligure (Italian: [ˈnɔːvi ˈliːɡure]; Ligurian: Nêuve, Ligurian: [ˈnøːve]; Piedmontese: Neuvi, Piedmontese: [ˈnøʋ]) is a comune (municipality) north of Genoa, in the province of Alessandria, in the Italian region of Piedmont.

The town produces food, iron, steel, and textiles. It is an important junction for both road and railroad.

== History ==
The community of Curtis Nova in 970 was donated by Emperor Otto I to the monastery of St. Salvatore in Pavia, becoming a castle around the year 1000.

Novi was a free commune until 1157, when it fell to Tortona. It was handed over the marquis of Montferrat in 1223, returning briefly to Tortona in 1232–64. In 1353 Giovanni Visconti of Milan and Genoa conquered it. Novi was donated to the latter in 1392, but was occupied by the condottiero Facino Cane in 1409–12. In 1447, after the death of Filippo Maria Visconti, the governors of the city decided to free forever from Milan, and gave it to Genoa. Around this time, a feudal lord Galeazzo Cavanna was Signore di Castel Gazzo, a fortress on the edge of the town. However, the Sforza of Milan retained its possession until the defeat of Ludovico il Moro, when it passed to the French until Andrea Doria conquered the city for Genoa in 1529.

Novi Ligure remained part of the Republic of Genoa until 1805, with the exception of a brief Austrian-Piedmontese occupation in 1745–46. In 1799 it was the site of a French defeat by an Austro-Russian army, in which the French commander Joubert was killed.

Novi was annexed to the French Empire and, after its fall, to the Kingdom of Sardinia. In 1818 it became provincial capital and received the suffix of "Ligure" to mark the historical vicinity to Genoa in contrast to the annexion of the province to that of Alessandria.

== Main sights ==
In the 17th and 18th centuries Novi Ligure was a renowned resort for the rich Genoese families, as showed by the presence of numerous noble palaces in the historical center of the city, often decorated with frescoes facades. These include Palazzo Negroni, Palazzo Durazzo and others. The most important palace is Palazzo Delle Piane (Delle Piane family), situated in the historic Piazza Delle Piane.

The Pieve of Santa Maria, on the road for Cassano, is the most ancient religious building (12th century). It has a nave with two aisles, and apses from the original edifice. In the interior is a fresco (1474) by Manfredino Boxilio, portraying the then sovereign of Novi, Oriana di Campofregoso and saints.

The Oratory of St. Madeleine houses a massive cavalry composed of 21 wooden statues and two natural-size horses, as well as an 8-statuettes terracotta Complaint of Christ; both are from Renaissance.

Novi has retained part of its walls, erected in 1447 and partly demolished in the 19th century, together with the tower of the Castle. The subterraneans can be visited in summer.

The Museo dei Campionissimi is a museum devoted to the two famous cyclists Costante Girardengo and Fausto Coppi and the bicycle history in general.

== Economy ==
The most important factory of the town is the group Elah-Dufour that produces Novi chocolate and Big Fruit candies. Also in town is the famous chocolate factory Pernigotti, founded in 1860.

The Garlando factory moved into the region in late 2002.

== Notable Novesi ==
- Delle Piane family (1255–)
- Romualdo Marenco (1841–1907), composer
- Costante Girardengo (1893–1978), professional cyclist
- Armando Massiglia (1911–1980), football player
- Giorgio Jegher (1937–1997)

== Sport ==
The town's football club are:

- USD Novese, winner of a scudetto in the 1921–22 season
- ASD Aquanera Comollo Novi

== Twin towns ==
- Marignane, France
- Sorbiers, France, since 2008
- Elbasan, Albania, since 2009
- (United Kingdom) Bicester, England, since 2010

== See also ==
- Battle of Novi (1799)
- Novi Ligure murder
