= Martin Kristensen =

Danish footballer (1921–1980)

Personal information
- Date of birth: 9 July 1921
- Date of death: 29 April 1980 (aged 58)

International career
| Years | Team | Apps | (Gls) |
| 1952 | Denmark | 1 | (0) |

Martin Kristensen (9 July 1921 – 29 April 1980) was a Danish footballer. He played in one match for the Denmark national football team in 1952.
