= Vernon S. Welch =

American politician (1906–1980)

Vernon S. Welch (September 25, 1906 – April 11, 1980) was an American lawyer and politician.

Welch was born in Minneapolis, Minnesota and went to the Minneapolis public schools. He received his bachelor's degree from University of Minnesota and his law degree from University of Minnesota Law School. Welch lived in Minneapolis with his wife and family and practiced law in Minneapolis. He was also involved in the banking business. Welch served in the Minnesota House of Representatives from 1939 to 1954 and was involved with the Republican Party. In 1976, Welch moved to Colorado Springs, Colorado. He died in Phoenix, Arizona, from a heart attack, while visiting friends. Welch was buried in Minneapolis, Minnesota.
