= Arlin Turner =

American biographer and professor of English

Henry Arlin Turner (November 25, 1909 – April 24, 1980) was an American biographer and professor of English, specializing in American literature of the 19th century.

== Biography ==
Arlin Turner graduated from West Texas State Teachers College with bachelor's degree in 1927 and from the University of Texas with Ph.D. in 1934. From 1933 to 1936 he taught in the English department of the University of Texas. From 1936 to 1952 he was a member of the department of English at Louisiana State University. During WW II he served in the United States Naval Reserve.

Turner was from 1953 to 1979 a professor at Duke University, where he also chaired the department of English for sixteen years. He retired in 1979 from Duke University as professor emeritus and then from 1979 until his death in 1980 taught at Southwest Texas State University.

Turner wrote four books and more than seventy articles published in scholarly journals. He wrote extensively on Nathaniel Hawthorne, George Washington Cable, and Mark Twain. Turner was managing editor from 1954 to 1963 and then editor from 1963 to 1979 for American Literature (published by Duke University Press). He also served on the editorial boards of Resources for American Literary Study, the South Atlantic Quarterly, the Arlington Quarterly, Studies in American Humor, and the Southern Literary Journal.

Turner was awarded Guggenheim Fellowships for the academic years 1947–1948 and 1959–1960. In 1958 the Southern Historical Association gave him the Charles S. Sydnor Award for his 1956 biography of George W. Cable. Turner was awarded an honorary degree of Doctor of Literature in 1976 from Berea College. In 1980 a collection of literary essays was published in his honor. His wife was Thelma Sherrill Turner (1910?–1999).

== Selected publications ==
=== Articles ===
- Turner, Arlin (1935). "Autobiographical Elements in Hawthorne's "the Blithedale Romance"". Studies in English (15): 39–62. JSTOR 20779463.
- —— (1936). "Hawthorne's Literary Borrowings". PMLA. 51 (2): 543–562. doi:10.2307/458069. JSTOR 458069. S2CID 163579204.
- —— (1938). "Hawthorne at Martha's Vineyard". The New England Quarterly. 11 (2): 394–400. doi:10.2307/360719. JSTOR 360719.
- —— (1940). "The Southern Novel". Southwest Review. 25 (2): 205–212. JSTOR 43462539.
- —— (1942). "Hawthorne and Reform". The New England Quarterly. 15 (4): 700–714. doi:10.2307/361506. JSTOR 361506.
- —— (1947). "Sources of Poe's "A Descent into the Maelstrom"". The Journal of English and Germanic Philology. 46 (3): 298–301. JSTOR 27712891.
- —— (1949). "Whittier Calls on George W. Cable". The New England Quarterly. 22 (1): 92–96. doi:10.2307/361539. JSTOR 361539.
- —— (1951). "A Novelist Discovers a Novelist: The Correspondence of H.H. Boyesen and George W. Cable". Western Humanities Review; Salt Lake City. 5 (4): 343.
- —— (1955). "Mark Twain, Cable, and "A Professional Newspaper Liar"". The New England Quarterly. 28 (1): 18–33. doi:10.2307/362358. JSTOR 362358.
- —— (1955). "James Lampton, Mark Twain's Model for Colonel Sellers". Modern Language Notes. 70 (8): 592–594. doi:10.2307/3040453. JSTOR 3040453.
- —— (1958). "Realism and Fantasy in Southern Humor". The Georgia Review. 12 (4): 451–457. JSTOR 41395587.
- —— (1964). "Nathaniel Hawthorne in American Studies". College English. 26 (2): 133–139. doi:10.2307/373664. JSTOR 373664.
- —— (1968). "Mark Twain and the South: An Affair of Love and Anger". The Southern Review. 4 (2): 493.
- —— (1968). "Joel Chandler Harris (1848-1908)". American Literary Realism, 1870-1910. 1 (3): 18–23. JSTOR 27747597.
- —— (1972). "George W. Cable on Prison Reform". Huntington Library Quarterly. 36 (1): 69–75. doi:10.2307/3816976. JSTOR 3816976.
- —— (1975). "Texts of Two Addresses Delivered at the Second Annual Meeting of the American Humor Studies Association of the MLA Convention in San Francisco in December 1975: A "Want-List" for the Study of American Humor". Studies in American Humor. 2 (2): 116–120. JSTOR 42573077.
- —— (1977). "George W. Cable's Use of the Past". The Mississippi Quarterly. 30 (4): 512–516. JSTOR 26474508.
- —— (1980). "Interpreting Nineteenth-Century American Literature—A Supplement". American Studies International. 18 (3/4): 5–21. JSTOR 41278634.

=== Books ===
- Turner, Arlin, ed. (1941). Hawthorne as Editor. Louisiana University Press.
- —— (1956). George W. Cable: A Biography. Durham, North Carolina: Duke University Press. 1966 pbk reprint. Louisiana State University Press. March 1966. ISBN 9780807101063.
- —— (1960). Mark Twain and George W. Cable: A Record of Literary Friendship. Ann Arbor: Michigan State University Press.
- —— (1961). Nathaniel Hawthorne: An Introduction and Interpretation. New York: Barnes and Noble; 149 pages
- ——, ed. (1980). Critical essays on George W. Cable. ISBN 9780816182565.
- —— (1980). Nathaniel Hawthorne: A Biography. New York: Oxford University Press.
