= St Patrick's Society of Hong Kong =

The St Patrick's Society of Hong Kong was established in 1931 to provide a forum for members of the Irish community and friends of Ireland in Hong Kong to celebrate Ireland's unique culture and heritage through social gatherings and events.

The society's first president was Sir Joseph Kemp CBE, the former Chief Justice of Hong Kong, who was elected in 1931. Since then, an esteemed list of influential figures in the landscape of Hong Kong have been elected as the president.

The role of the society has evolved over its lifetime, from the position when it was the only formalized Irish representation in Hong Kong, to its current position, where it is one of a number of Irish established organisations in Hong Kong.

Being the only formal Irish representation, the society has played a key role in representing Ireland in Hong Kong.

The society is registered as a society under the Hong Kong Societies Ordinance. It operates as a limited company and is governed by a board of directors that it elected annually at the annual general meeting. The president of the society is elected by the outgoing board of directors.

The highlight of the society's social calendar is The St Patrick's Society Ball, an event that has a steeped history in Hong Kong. In its formative years, the Ball was held in the former Hilton Hotel (site of Cheung Kong Center), then to the Furama Hotel (the site of AIA tower), before moving to its current location of the Grand Hyatt Hong Kong in 2002. The Hong Kong–based Celtic Connections Chamber Choir, founded by Canice Gleeson in 2010, is a regular performer at the annual ball.
