= Grigoriy Dovzhenko =

Ukrainian muralist

Grigoriy Avksentiyevich Dovzhenko Григорій Овксентійович Довженко
- Born: 22 April 1899; Bashtanka, Russian Empire
- Died: 21 April 1980 (aged 80); Kiev, Ukrainian Soviet Socialist Republic, Soviet Union
- Occupations: Artist, painter

Grigoriy Avksentiyevich Dovzhenko (22 April 1899 – 21 April 1980) was a Soviet Ukrainian muralist, Honoured Artist of USSR, member of the Union of Artists of Ukraine.

== Biography ==
Grigoriy Avksentiyevich Dovzhenko was born on 22 April (10 April old style) 1899, in Poltavka village (now Bashtanka, Mykolaiv Oblast, Ukraine). In 1907 – 1913 he studied in Poltava local school (2 classes). In 1913, his family moved to Gvozdievka village in Siberia. In 1916, Grigoriy Dovzhenko moved to Omsk, where he was working as a porter. At the same time he passed exams without attending the higher school. In 1917 Dovzhenko began studying at the Red Arts of Siberia. At the same time, he was working as a postman and a warden at Akmolinsk veterinary department.

== Profession ==
- 1918 – 1920 – works as an illustrator in Siberia oblast' printing agency (Omsk), performed settings for the opera "Prince Igor" staged in Siberia State Opera House.
- 1920 – 1921 – works as a scene painter in Siberia State Opera House, then in the fall 1921 he with his family returned to Ukraine, where he's working as a drawing teacher in Mykolaiv area department of political awareness.
- 1922 – Grigoriy Dovzhenko enters Odessa Art Institute. In 1923 – 1924 he took a journey over Ukraine, making a lot of drawings, landscape and still-life pictures.
- 1925 – his works are presented at the exhibition of students' works at Odessa Art Institute. At this time he enters the Association of Revolutionary Art of Ukraine (ARAU), and is elected its secretary in Odessa branch.
- 1926 – work on the picture "Song about Freedom". Grigoriy is elected the delegate of all-Ukrainian ARAU congress.
- 1927 – work on the decoration of the Eastern Chamber of Commerce in Odessa. In May, Grigoriy Dovzhenko graduated from the Odessa Art Institute with qualification of artist-muralist.
- 1928 – work on the decoration of Farmers' Sanatorium VUTSIK. Grigoriy as well is working as drawing teacher at that time.
- 1930 – 1936 – Grigoriy is a teacher at Kyiv Art Institute (currently – National Art and Architecture Academy). In 1930 he also worked as an artist at Odessa movie studio.
- 1941 – as the World War II began, Grigoriy Dovzhenko evacuated to Tajikistan, where he worked as a teacher and the secretary of Tajikistan Union of Artists committee. He also was involved in the construction works at power plant near Dushanbe, published a lot of antifascist drawings.
- 1945 – enters Red Army, sniper school. This year Grigoriy Dovzhenko enters the Communist Party and after the WWII was over, returned to Ukraine.
- 1948 – obtains inventor's certificate for fine art technique from the USSR Council of Ministers' State Committee for Inventions and Discoveries.
- 1953 – 1960 – teacher at Kyiv school of arts and crafts.
- 1956 – elected the delegate of the III session of USSR Union of Artists.
- 1957 – elected the delegate of the session of USSR Union of Artists.
- 18 December 1979 – awarded the title of Honoured Artist of Ukrainian SSR.

== Main works ==
- 1920 – settings for the opera "Prince Igor" staged in Siberia State Opera House.
- 1923 – 1924 – various landscape and still-life pictures made during his journey over Ukraine.
- 1926 – picture "Song about Freedom".
- 1927 – decoration of the Eastern Chamber of Commerce in Odessa.
- 1928 – sketches and decoration of Farmers' Sanatorium VUTSIK.
- 1929 – decoration of the Press House named after Kotsiubynsky in Odessa.
- 1930 – works as an artist at Odessa Film Studio, at the movies' production: "Perekop", "25000", "Parents' Right", "Museum Guard".
- 1930 – 1936 – a series of landscapes is done during journey to Crimea.
- 1934 – picture "Cheapskate Nest".
- 1936 – picture "Shevchenko in casemate".
- 1940 – picture "Shchors' death".
- 1947 – series of fresco portraits "Ukrainian partisans", "Portrait of a girl", etc.
- 1950 – decoration of Novo-Gorlovka Palace of Culture.
- 1951 – 1954 – decoration of Summer Theatre, Palace of Culture, residential houses and facilities for the children in Nova Kakhovka.
- 1955 – decoration of Palace of Culture, named after I.Franko (Donetsk).
- 1956 – pictures "Golden autumn", "Over the Dnieper", "Botanical garden", "Still-life with fish", "Flowers", etc.
- 1957 – decoration of Palace of Culture "Kharchovyk" (Kyiv).
- 1958 – 1963 – series of decorations for various buildings in Rovno, Ivano-Frankivsk, Kyiv; after trip to Baltics republics creates number of landscapes.
- 1965 – monumental paintings with polymeric material application: "Ornamental motif", "A woman with wheat", "Cossack Mamay", etc.
- 1970 – fresco paintings "Worker and Kolkhoz Woman", "Revolution is coming" etc. in Palace of Culture in Chernihiv. Series of sketches "Skify", "Yaroslav' message", "Golden Gate", "Prince Igor" etc.
- 1971 – mosaic "Kyi, Shchek and Khoryv" in "Rovesnik" movie theatre (Kyiv).
- 1972 – 1975 – decoration of the library for youth (Kyiv); fresco portraits of Taras Shevchenko, Lesya Ukrainka, I.Franko.
- 1976 – 1979 – decoration of Palace of Culture in Lozova, Kharkiv Oblast'; series of portraits of Ukrainian culture activists: A. Dovzhenko, O.Soroka, M. Leontovych, G.Veryovka, V.Sosyura, etc.

Grigoriy Dovzhenko had a son, Taras Dovzhenko (born 1931), who became a Merited Architect of Ukraine (1994).

Grigoriy Dovzhenko died on 21 April 1980 in Kyiv and was buried on Baikove Cemetery.
