= Christian Sole =

Norwegian politician

Christian Sole (13 November 1896 – 1 April 1980) was a Norwegian politician for the Conservative Party.

He served as a deputy representative to the Parliament of Norway from Rogaland during the term 1945–1949. In total he met during fourteen days of parliamentary session.
