= Esther Silveus =

American physician (1903–1980)

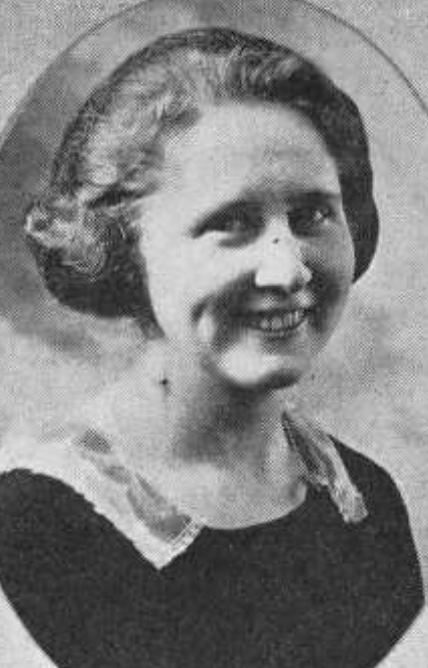
- Esther Silveus, from the 1921 yearbook of Slippery Rock State Normal School
- Born: January 14, 1903; Swissvale, Pennsylvania
- Died: April 27, 1980 (aged 77); Cambridge, Massachusetts
- Other name: Esther Carlson
- Occupations: Physician, radiologist, medical researcher
- Spouse: Elmer Carlson

Esther Silveus (January 14, 1903 – April 27, 1980) was an American radiologist and medical researcher based at the Lahey Clinic in Boston from 1942 to 1967.

== Early life and education ==
Silveus was born in Swissvale, Pennsylvania, near Pittsburgh, the daughter of John G. Silveus and Ura Malnor Williams Silveus. She completed teacher training at Slippery Rock State Normal School in 1921, and graduated from Bryn Mawr College in 1926, and earned her medical degree at the University of Pittsburgh in 1932. She was president of the Pittsburgh chapter of Zeta Phi, a medical sorority.

== Career ==
Silveus had a medical practice in Mercer, Pennsylvania after medical school. From 1939 to 1941, she served a residency in radiology at the Western Pennsylvania Hospital. She was chief of the x-ray department at Good Samaritan Hospital in Lebanon, Pennsylvania in 1941 and 1942, when male specialists were called away to serve in World War II.

In 1942 Silveus joined the Lahey Clinic in Boston, and continued there as a radiologist until her retirement in 1967. She had staff privileges at several Boston hospitals, and was president and secretary of the Boston chapter of the American Medical Women's Association. She was a member of the American College of Radiology and the Radiological Society of North America. In 1973, she was honored as an Outstanding Alumna of Slippery Rock State College.

== Publications ==
Silveus published her medical research in academic journals including Radiology, Surgical Clinics of North America, JAMA Internal Medicine, and The Journal of Clinical Investigation.

- "The protein content of the cerebrospinal fluid in myxedema" (1928, with Willard Owen Thompson, Phebe K. Thompson, and Mary Elizabeth Dailey)
- "The Cerebrospinal Fluid in Myxedema" (1929, with Willard Owen Thompson, Phebe K. Thompson, and Mary Elizabeth Dailey)
- "Benign mediastinal tumors; a report of six cases with analysis of diagnostic criteria and advocation of surgical removal" (1947, with Ralph Adams)
- "Esophageal and Gastric Varices, with Report of a Case" (1948, with Hugh F. Hare and F. A. Ruoff)
- "Roentgenologic Diagnosis of Pituitary Tumors" (1949, with Hugh F. Hare and Magnus I. Smedal)
- "Hysterosalpingography and Tubal Insufflation" (1956)
- "Late changes in spleen and liver due to thorotrast and their significance" (1958)

== Personal life ==
Esther Silveus married Elmer S. Carlson in 1948. They restored a farm in Groton, Massachusetts, and gave much of the farm's produce to her colleagues at the Lahey Clinic. She died at a hospital in Cambridge, Massachusetts in 1980, aged 77 years.
