= Bill Rutherford (footballer) =

Scottish footballer

Personal information
- Full name: William John Rutherford
- Date of birth: 23 January 1930
- Place of birth: Bellshill, Lanarkshire, Scotland
- Date of death: 29 April 1980 (aged 50)
- Place of death: Southport, Lancashire, England
- Position: Wing half

Senior career*
| Years | Team | Apps | (Gls) |
| – | Dunoon Athletic | | |
| 1949–1951 | Ayr United | 8 | (0) |
| 1951–1952 | Stirling Albion | 8 | (0) |
| 1952–1959 | Darlington | 251 | (3) |
| 1959–1964 | Southport | 176 | (7) |
| – | Kirkby Town | | |
- * Club domestic league appearances and goals

William John Rutherford (23 January 1930 – 29 April 1980) was a Scottish footballer who made 16 appearances in the Scottish Football League playing for Ayr United and Stirling Albion and 427 appearances in the English Football League playing for Darlington and Southport. A wing half, he was active in league football from 1949 to 1964. He also played in Scottish junior football for Dunoon Athletic and in English non-league football for Kirkby Town.

Rutherford was a member of the Darlington team that inflicted an embarrassing defeat on Chelsea, league champions only three seasons earlier, to eliminate them from the 1957–58 FA Cup by four goals to one.
