= Pavel Markov =

Soviet theatre critic (1897–1980)

Pavel Aleksandrovich Markov (Russian: Павел Александрович Марков; 22 March 1897, Tula – 5 April 1980, Moscow) was a Soviet theatre critic, literary manager, and teacher. Between 1925 and 1949, he was head of the Literary Section of the Moscow Art Theatre. He was the chairman of the "lower committee" of the theatre's management. He has been described as "the most outstanding teacher and critic of his generation."

== Awards and Honors ==
- Honored Artist of the RSFSR (1944)
- Order of Lenin (26 October 1948) — for outstanding contributions to the development of Soviet theatrical art and in connection with the 50th anniversary of the founding of the Moscow Order of Lenin and Order of the Red Banner of Labour Art Academic Theatre of the USSR named after M. Gorky
- Order of the Red Banner of Labour
- Order of the Badge of Honour (26 October 1938) — in connection with the 40th anniversary of the Moscow Order of Lenin Art Academic Theatre of the USSR named after M. Gorky

== Sources ==
- Benedetti, Jean. 1999. Stanislavski: His Life and Art. Revised edition. Original edition published in 1988. London: Methuen. ISBN 978-0-413-52520-8.
- Worrall, Nick. 1996. The Moscow Art Theatre. Theatre Production Studies ser. London and NY: Routledge. ISBN 978-0-415-05598-7.
