= Bernice M. Watson =

American politician

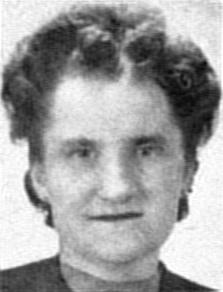

Member of the Michigan House of Representatives from the Genesee County 1st district
- In office January 1, 1947 – 1948

Personal details
- Born: August 16, 1901 Breckenridge, Michigan
- Died: April 15, 1980 (aged 78) Flint, Michigan
- Party: Republican
- Education: Central Michigan University; University of Michigan; Michigan State College

Bernice M. Watson (August 16, 1901 – April 15, 1980) was a Michigan politician.

== Early life ==
Watson was born on August 16, 1901, in Breckenridge, Michigan.

== Education ==
Watson earned a A.B. from Central Michigan University. Watson also received special training in public speaking and dramatics graduate study from the University of Michigan and Michigan State College.

== Career ==
Watson worked as a teacher and a principal. Watson was a member of the Michigan Education Association and the National Education Association. On November 5, 1946, Watson was elected to the Michigan House of Representatives where she represented the Genesee County 1st district from January 1, 1947, to 1948.

== Personal life ==
Watson was the widow of a World War I veteran and was a member of the American Legion Auxiliary. She had one child. Watson was Baptist.

== Death ==
Watson died on April 15, 1980, in Flint, Michigan.
