= Antoni Żabko-Potopowicz =

Polish economist (1895–1980)

Antoni Żabko-Potopowicz (9 June 1895 in Oczesa-Rudnia, Chernigov Governorate, Russian Empire – 26 April 1980 in Warsaw) was an economist of agriculture, economic historian, and professor at Warsaw Agricultural University. He was a member of Polish Science Society (Towarzystwo Naukowe Warszawskie) and co-founder of the 1945 incarnation of the Polish Economic Society (Polskie Towarzystwo Ekonomiczne).

== Honors ==
- Cross of Valor (1921)
- Knight's Cross of the Order of Polonia Restituta (1959)
- Officer's Cross of the Order of Polonia Restituta (1967)
- Warsaw University of Life Sciences Agricultural Academy Golden Badge (1969)
- Medal of the 30th anniversary of People's Poland (1974)
- Honorary Badge of the Polish Librarians Association (1976)
- Badge "Meritorious for Forestry and Wood Industry," awarded by the Minister of Forestry and Wood Industry (1976)
- Badge "For merits for the Kielce region" (1979)

== Publications ==
Żabko-Potopowicz published mostly in the Polish Language, often commenting on social agrarian farms from the 18th century to the early 20th century in what is now Poland.

- Praca najemna i najemnik w W. Ks. Litewskim w wieku XVIII-ym na tle ewolucji stosunków w rolnictwie [Contract work and mercenary work in the Grand Duchy of Lithuania in the 18th century, against the background of the evolution of agricultural relations] (in Polish). 1929.
- Nauka o społecznem gospodarstwie agrarnem w Stanach Zjednoczonych Ameryki Północnej [Science about social agrarian farming in the United States of America] (in Polish). 1931.
- Wieś polska w świetle polskich prac naukowych i publicystycznych w Rocznikach SGGW [The Polish countryside in the light of Polish scientific and journalistic works in the Annals of the Warsaw University of Life Sciences] (in Polish). 1931–1935.
- Traktat Wersalski a niemiecka nauka o społecznem gospodarstwie agrarnem [The Treaty of Versailles and German science in social agrarian farms] (in Polish). 1932.
- Szkoła Główna Gospodarstwa Wiejskiego w Warszawie, jej dzieje i znaczenie [Warsaw University of Life Sciences: its history and importance] (in Polish). 1937.
- "Rolnictwo w Polsce. Stan, bolączki, zadania, drogi naprawy" [Agriculture in Poland. Condition, ills, tasks, ways of repair.]. Stan rolnictwa w Polsce [The State of Agriculture in Poland] (in Polish). 1938.
- Uwagi o zagadnieniu gospodarki planowej [Comments on the issue of planned economy] (in Polish). 1939.
- Gospodarstwo wiejskie na Ziemiach Odzyskanyc [A farm in the Regained Territories] (in Polish). 1947.
- (With other authors) (1948). Prace Zakładu Polityki Ekonomicznej [Works of the Department of Economic Policy] (in Polish). Vol. II.
- Zarys rozwoju wiedzy leśnej do pierwszej wojny światowej [Outline of the development of forest knowledge until the First World War] (in Polish). 1948.
- "Zagadnienie rozwarstwienia się wsi" [The issue of rural stratification]. Ekonomista (in Polish). 1948 (4). 1948.
- Produkcja rolnicza i potrzeby spożywcze Polski [Agricultural production and food needs of Poland] (in Polish). 1949.
- Ogólne warunki rozwoju rolnictwa w Polsce [General conditions for the development of agriculture in Poland] (in Polish). 1949.
- "Dzieje bartnictwa w Polsce" [The history of beekeeping in Poland]. Roczników Dziejów Społecznych i Gospodarczych [Annals of Social and Economic History] (in Polish). 15. 1953.
- Polskie piśmiennictwo leśne w Królestwie Polskim po utrwaleniu się kapitalizmu (1866–1915) [Polish forestry literature in the Kingdom of Poland after the consolidation of capitalism (1866-1915)] (in Polish). 1959–1960.
- Zarys rozwoju wiedzy leśnej do pierwszej wojny światowej [Outline of the development of forest knowledge until the First World War] (in Polish). 1968.
- Twórcy i organizatorzy leśnictwa polskiego na tle jego rozwoju [Creators and organizers of Polish forestry in the context of its development] (in Polish). 1974.
- Pionierzy postępu w rolnictwie polskim [Pioneers of progress in Polish agriculture] (in Polish). 1977.

Additionally, Żabko-Potopowicz edited and contributed to the following publications:

- Scientific secretary of publication for Księga Pamiątkowa SGGW 1906–56" [Memorial Book of the Warsaw University of Life Sciences 1906–56"] (in Polish). 1956.
- Chairman of the editorial committee and author of some sections, Dzieje lasów, leśnictwa i drzewnictwa w Polsce [The history of forests, forestry and wood industry in Poland] (in Polish). 1965.
- Chairman of the editorial committee, Polskie Towarzystwo Leśne w Polsce Ludowej (Działalność i kierunki rozwoju) [Polish Forest Society in People's Poland (Activities and directions of development)] (in Polish). 1972.

== See also ==
- List of Poles
