= Ronald Brinton =

English cricketer

Cricket information
- Batting: Right-handed

Career statistics
Competition	First-class
Matches	2
Runs scored	22
Batting average	5.50
100s/50s	0/0
Top score	10
Balls bowled	30
Wickets	0
Bowling average	–
5 wickets in innings	–
10 wickets in match	–
Best bowling	–
Catches/stumpings	0/–
- Source: Cricinfo, 15 April 2023

Ronald Lewis Brinton (26 February 1903 – 19 April 1980) was an English cricketer whose first-class cricket career comprised two matches for Worcestershire in June 1922. Worcestershire lost both games inside two days, and Brinton made no score of note in either.

Brinton was born in Kidderminster, Worcestershire; he died at the age of 77 in Malvern.
