= Raphael Hamilton =

American historian (1892–1980)

- Born: November 5, 1892; Omaha, Nebraska, U.S.
- Died: April 19, 1980 (aged 87); Milwaukee, Wisconsin, U.S.
- Education: Creighton University, St. Louis University,
- Occupations: Priest, Professor, Archivist

Raphael Noteware Hamilton, S.J. (November 5, 1892 – April 19, 1980) was an American Jesuit and professor of history at Marquette University. He is also considered the founder of Marquette University Special Collections and University Archives.

== Education (1913–1932) ==
Hamilton attended Creighton University, achieving his Bachelor of Arts degree in 1913. He entered the Society of Jesus in 1913 and was ordained a priest in 1926. Father Hamilton, S.J., went to graduate school at St. Louis University, attaining his master's and doctoral degrees in history in 1919 and 1932 respectively.

== Marquette University (1930–1973) ==
Father Hamilton, S.J., held several positions at Marquette University. They included assistant professor, 1930–1932; associate professor, 1932–1957; chair of the history department, 1932–1956; dean of the graduate school, 1940–1944; and professor emeritus, 1964. In addition, he served the role of university historian. Hamilton was an accomplished author on the activities of French explorers in North America. In particular, he was an expert on the life of Pere Jacques Marquette, S.J, the namesake of the university. Father Hamilton taught an extensive array of courses while at Marquette University, but specialized in American Colonial History.

== Marquette University Archives and Special Collections (1961–1980) ==
In addition to his career as an educator he was also responsible for the founding of Marquette University’s Archives and Special Collections in 1961. His second career began in 1961, when he was asked to organize the Marquette Archives, and from 1964 he devoted his full to time to this new task. Along with the University Archives, he invited other collections, and developed a body of records that documented the trend of American Catholic social changes in the late 19th and 20th centuries. Under Hamilton’s guidance the newly founded archives came to include the papers of Senator Joseph McCarthy of Wisconsin, the J.R.R. Tolkien Manuscripts and a number of rare complete set of 14th century antiphonals.

== Post-professional life (1973–1980) ==
Father Hamilton, S.J., retired in 1973, yet he continued to have a close relationship to the university until his death. He died on April 19, 1980, in Milwaukee, Wisconsin at St. Mary's Nursing home after months of failing health.

== Archival collections ==
Raphael N. Hamilton, S.J., Papers, Marquette University

This collection consists of Father Hamilton's, S.J. correspondence and publications. His seminal works are his dissertation, A Cartography of the Missouri Valley: To the Establishment of "La Compagnie d' Occident," 1717, 1932; The Story of Marquette University: An Object Lesson in the Development of Catholic Higher Education, 1953; Great Men of Michigan: Father Marquette, 1970; Marquette's Explorations: The Narratives Reexamined, 1970. Also included are several short articles and speeches, both published and unpublished. Concluding the collection is a pair of illustrated, unpublished monographs penned by C.W. Hamilton; The Lives of English Cardinals, [n.d.] and Vacation Days in England, 1912.

== Books ==
- A Cartography of the Missouri Valley: To the Establishment of "La Compagnie d' Occident," 1717, 1932.
- The Story of Marquette University: An Object Lesson in the Development of Catholic Higher Education, 1953.
- Great Men of Michigan: Father Marquette, 1970.
- Marquette's Explorations: The Narratives Reexamined, 1970.
- The Story of Marquette University: An Object Lesson in the Development of Catholic Higher Education, 1953.

== See also ==
- Marquette University
- Society of Jesus
- Marquette University Special Collections and University Archives
