= Latchford Barracks =

Coordinates: 36°7′57″S 147°0′2″E

- Bonegilla, Victoria, Australia

Site information
- Type: Army barracks
- Controlled by: Australian Army

Site history
- Built: 1940

Latchford Barracks (formerly the Bonegilla Army Camp) is an Australian Army base in Bonegilla, located about 8 km (5 mi) to the east of Wodonga. It is named after Colonel E.W. Latchford, MBE, MC (1889–1962). The base was established in 1940 as the Bonegilla Army Camp with the current barracks being formally opened in 1983 following the redevelopment of the base in 1978. The barracks is host to the Army Logistic Training Centre. The Bonegilla Migrant Reception and Training Centre was located at the barracks, prior to the barracks being reused for military purposes.

== Torture video ==
In November 2021, the ABC reported an incident of "bastardisation" of a Royal Australian Air Force recruit in 2020. Video of the incident showed the recruit being tied up and tortured by another serviceman. Police reportedly found that "a criminal offence could not be determined at the time". The recruit, now retired, claims that the incident has destroyed him.
