= 1938–39 Serie B =

Italian football league season

Serie B
- Season: 1938–39
- Champions: Fiorentina; 2nd title

Serie B 1938-39 team distribution

The Serie B 1938–39 was the tenth tournament of this competition played in Italy since its creation.

== Teams ==
Casale, Fanfulla, SPAL, Siena and Salernitana had been promoted from Serie C, while Novara and Alessandria had been relegated from Serie A.

== Events ==
The league was expanded to eighteen clubs to allow a wider representation of Southern Italy.

The goal average substituted the tie-breaker in event of equal points, to save time considering the risk of war. This change greatly helped Venezia.

== Final classification ==
Pos	Team	Pld	W	D	L	GF	GA	GR	Pts	Promotion or relegation
1	Fiorentina (P, C)	34	16	13	5	62	30	2.067	45	Promotion to Serie A (Note: Venezia promoted on goal average.)
2	Venezia (P)	34	16	11	7	39	23	1.696	43	Promotion to Serie A
3	Atalanta	34	15	13	6	43	26	1.654	43	
4	Siena	34	17	8	9	43	35	1.229	42	
5	Verona	34	16	8	10	46	36	1.278	40	
6	Pro Vercelli	34	14	9	11	50	44	1.136	37	
7	Palermo	34	13	10	11	35	34	1.029	36	
8	Alessandria	34	14	7	13	57	43	1.326	35	
9	Padova	34	15	5	14	56	51	1.098	35	
10	Fanfulla	34	12	10	12	39	32	1.219	34	
11	Sanremese	34	14	6	14	41	45	0.911	34	
12	Anconitana	34	13	7	14	50	44	1.136	33	
13	Pisa	34	13	7	14	52	46	1.130	33	
14	Vigevano	34	11	11	12	43	48	0.896	33	
15	Spezia (R)	34	12	7	15	43	50	0.860	31	Relegation to Serie C
16	S.P.A.L. (R)	34	10	6	18	37	55	0.673	26	Relegation to Serie C
17	Salernitana (R)	34	10	3	21	40	58	0.690	23	Relegation to Serie C
18	Casale (R)	34	2	5	27	12	88	0.136	9	Relegation to Serie C

Source: goal average officially used in event of equal points.
(C) Champions; (P) Promoted; (R) Relegated

== Results ==
Home \ Away	ALE	ANC	ATA	CSL	FAN	FIO	PAD	PAL	PIS	PVE	SAL	SNR	SIE	SPA	SPE	VEN	HEL	VIG
Alessandria		4–0	1–2	4–0	2–1	2–2	1–0	1–1	4–1	1–1	4–1	3–0	0–1	3–0	3–0	1–0	3–0	4–1
Anconitana	3–1		2–0	2–0	1–1	0–0	0–1	4–1	2–0	6–1	2–0	4–0	1–3	2–1	1–1	0–1	1–1	3–0
Atalanta	2–1	1–1		6–1	1–0	1–1	1–1	0–0	2–0	1–0	3–0	3–0	0–0	0–0	2–1	0–1	0–0	1–1
Casale	1–1	2–2	0–2		1–3	0–2	0–3	0–1	1–3	0–0	1–2	0–2	0–1	2–1	0–1	0–0	1–0	0–3
Fanfulla	1–3	1–2	0–1	3–0		0–0	4–1	1–0	0–0	2–0	1–0	1–1	3–0	1–0	1–0	1–3	2–1	5–0
Fiorentina	4–1	2–0	0–3	3–0	4–0		3–1	7–1	2–0	3–1	2–0	0–0	4–0	2–1	2–2	2–2	3–0	1–1
Padova	5–1	4–1	1–2	4–0	1–3	1–3		1–0	2–1	3–1	2–0	4–3	1–1	2–1	4–2	1–1	1–0	3–2
Palermo	1–1	2–0	0–0	1–0	1–1	2–1	2–1		1–0	4–1	3–0	1–0	0–0	2–0	4–1	0–0	4–0	0–0
Pisa	4–2	3–2	1–1	8–0	1–1	0–1	4–2	1–0		1–0	3–1	0–0	0–2	4–1	2–1	2–1	1–1	3–0
Pro Vercelli	0–1	2–1	4–1	2–0	2–1	1–1	2–2	0–0	4–1		3–0	1–0	3–1	3–1	3–0	0–1	0–2	1–1
Salernitana	3–1	2–0	1–1	5–0	0–0	1–1	1–0	1–2	1–2	2–3		7–1	1–0	1–0	1–2	1–0	2–4	2–1
Sanremese	2–1	1–0	0–1	4–1	0–0	1–1	2–0	2–0	2–1	1–1	1–0		3–1	3–2	1–0	0–1	4–1	3–1
Siena	2–1	2–0	3–2	1–0	1–0	3–0	0–1	1–0	3–3	1–1	3–2	1–0		1–1	1–0	2–0	2–0	1–0
SPAL	1–0	1–2	0–0	4–1	2–1	1–1	1–0	1–0	2–1	0–3	3–1	2–0	3–2		1–4	0–0	3–3	3–2
Spezia	0–0	1–0	0–0	4–0	1–0	0–3	2–1	3–0	1–0	1–2	3–1	0–3	2–2	3–0		1–1	2–0	1–1
Venezia	1–0	1–3	3–1	3–0	0–0	1–1	3–1	2–0	1–0	2–1	3–0	1–0	1–1	1–0	3–0		0–1	1–1
Hellas Verona	1–0	0–0	2–0	7–0	0–0	2–0	1–1	2–0	1–0	1–1	1–0	2–1	1–0	2–0	3–0	2–0		4–2
Vigevano	1–1	3–2	0–2	0–0	2–0	1–0	2–0	1–1	1–1	1–2	2–0	3–0	1–0	2–0	4–3	0–0	2–0	

Updated to match(es) played on unknown. Source: Almanacco Illustrato del Calcio - La Storia 1898-2004, Panini Edizioni, Modena, September 2005 (in Italian)
Legend: Blue = home team win; Yellow = draw; Red = away team win.

== References and sources ==
- Almanacco Illustrato del Calcio - La Storia 1898-2004, Panini Edizioni, Modena, September 2005
