= Manouchehr Vazifekhah =

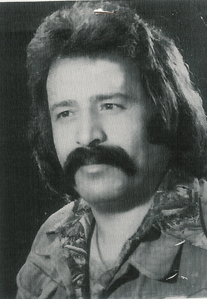
Manouchehr Vazifekhah

Manouchehr Vazifekhah (Persian: منوچهر وظیفه‌خواه 1940 – 12 April 1980), known by his alias Dr. Manouchehri, was a senior interrogator and head of the internal security department in SAVAK, the intelligence and security organization of Iran under the Pahlavi dynasty. He served as the chief of the interrogation team at the Joint Committee to Fight Sabotage (Komiteh Moshtarak-e Zed-e Kharabkari) from 1971 until the Iranian Revolution in February 1979.

== Career ==
Vazifekhah held the position of chief interrogator in SAVAK’s anti-subversion unit for approximately seven years, from 1971 to February 1979. He was reportedly responsible for operations involving surveillance, arrest, and interrogation of political dissidents, including members of the clergy and opposition groups, as part of efforts to maintain national security during a period of political unrest.

== Allegations ==
Vazifekhah has been accused of employing extreme torture methods during interrogations, such as the Apollo device (a metal helmet that amplified screams and heat), Qapani handcuffs, crucifixion, burning with cigarettes or hot irons, inserting needles under fingernails, forcing prisoners (especially clergymen) to beat one another and compelling them to consume alcohol.

Ali Khamenei, the former Supreme Leader of Iran, stated in a 2005 television documentary that he had been interrogated by “Manouchehri” while detained at the Joint Anti-Sabotage Committee prison.

Other prominent figures who reportedly endured torture under Vazifekhah include:

- Mahmoud Taleghani
- Mohammad Reza Mahdavi Kani
- Sadegh Khalkhali
- Hossein-Ali Montazeri
- Hadi Ghaffari
- Akbar Hashemi Rafsanjani
- Mohammad Mohammadi Gilani
- Mohammad Mohammadi Reyshahri

== Accounts from former prisoners ==
Several individuals have shared recollections of their experiences during interrogations associated with Vazifekhah:

- Ali Khamenei: “Manouchehri came into my cell and said, ‘Khamenei, is that you?’ I said yes. ‘So you’re the Khamenei they’re talking about?’ … ‘Do you know who I am?’ I said no. ‘I’m Manouchehri.’ He stared at my face to see the effect of his name. ‘I know you very well—you’re the one who slips away from interrogators like a fish.’”
- Saeed Shahsavandi: “Manouchehri whipped me so much that the scars remain on my legs to this day; during interrogation he would laugh while pushing hot needles under my fingernails.”
- Sadegh Khalkhali: “One day before I was exiled to Kerman, Manouchehri entered my cell, urinated on my face, and cursed, saying, ‘If I don’t turn this donkey into a human, I’m no doctor.’”
- Mohammad Mohammadi Reyshahri: “Manouchehri kicked me in the face so hard that I had to get dentures.”
- Marzieh Hadidchi: “Manouchehri was the doctor of torture. Whenever he saw me, he would poke my eyes with his finger and extinguish cigarettes behind my ears.”
- Ahmad Salek Kashani: “After countless lashes, Manouchehri would send me for bandaging, only to resume the whipping. We lived in filth and mud.”

== Assassination ==
Following the Iranian Revolution, Vazifekhah fled Iran on 15 February 1979 and joined his children in the United Kingdom. On 12 April 1980, he was shot dead outside a London police station by agents of the Islamic Republic. The assassination order was reportedly issued by Sadegh Khalkhali.

Some sources claim he was targeted because he possessed extensive knowledge of the files of imprisoned clerics during the Pahlavi era.

== Gallery ==
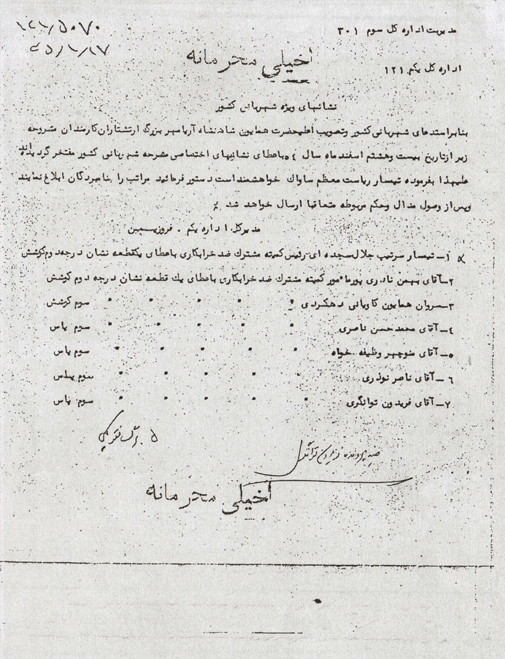
Request to award medals of honor to SAVAK employees

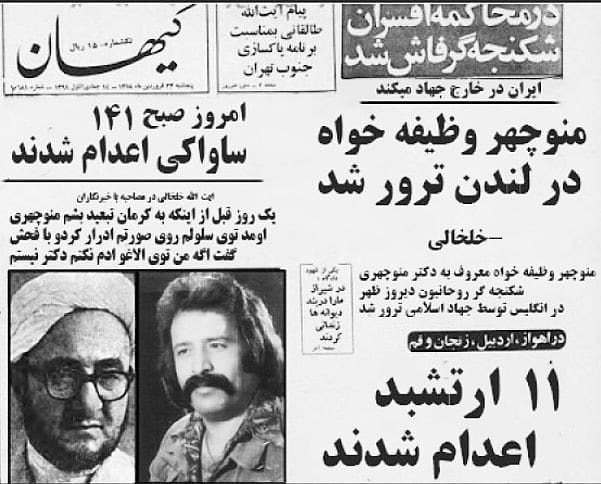
Kayhan newspaper 10 January 1980: IRI is doing Jihad aboard, Manouchehr Vazifekhah was assassinated in London. Ayatollah Khalkhali in an interview with reporters: “One day before I was exiled to Kerman, Manouchehri entered my cell, urinated on my face, and cursed, saying, ‘If I don’t turn this donkey into a human, I’m no doctor.’”
