= Yuri Milonov =

Russian political activist (1895-1980)

Yuri Konstantinovich Milonov (Russian: Юрий Константинович Милонов; 20 April [O.S. 8 April] 1895 in Nizhny Novgorod – 7 April 1980 in Moscow) was a Russian political activist who joined the Bolshevik faction of the Russian Social Democratic and Labour Party in 1912. He was arrested in 1915, and sent on internal exile to Saratov. Here he used his administrative skills to support a hospital fund for print shop workers and the agricultural census commission set up by the Zemstvo of the Samara Governorate.

== Samara ==
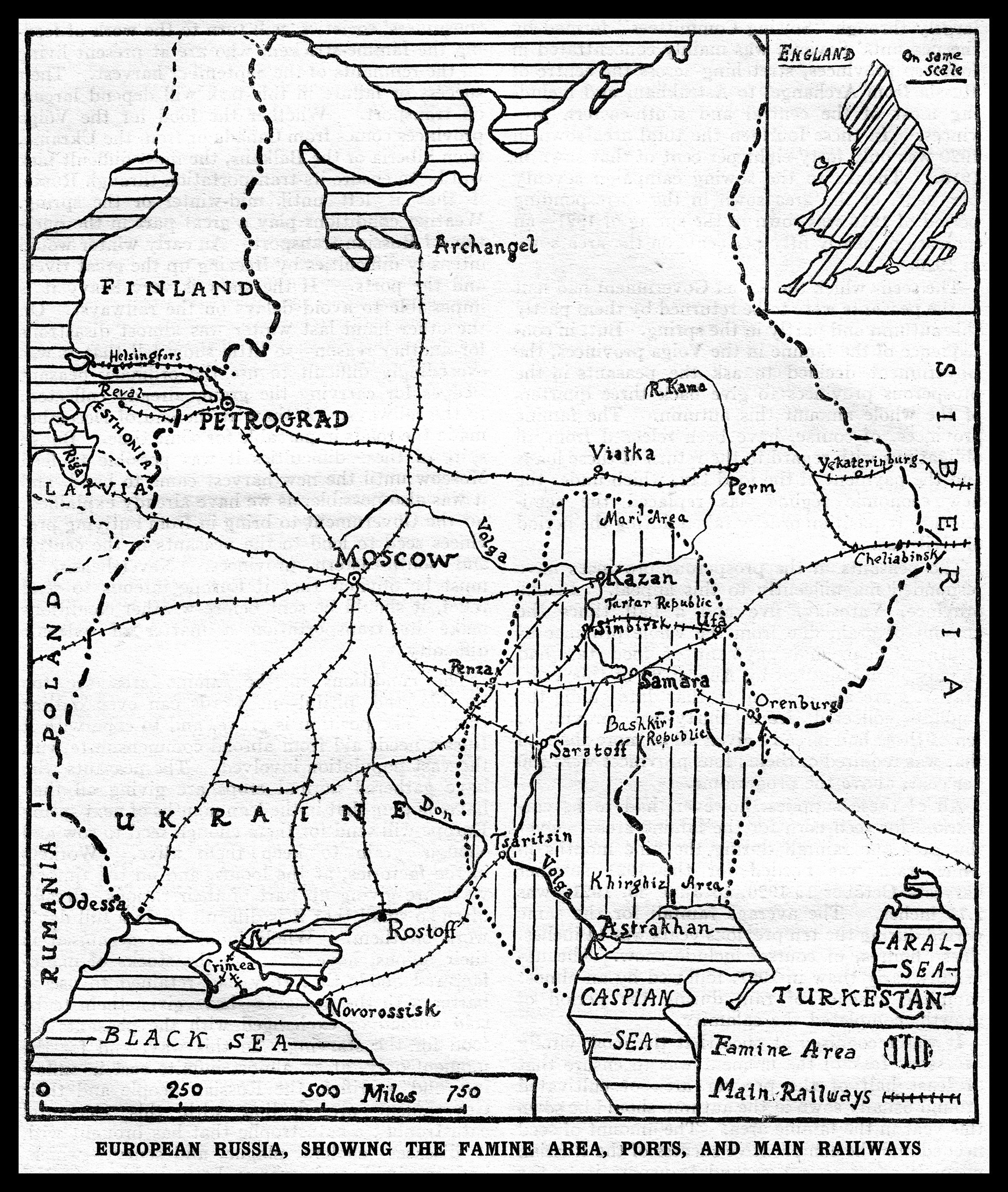
Samara, located in the area of the Russian famine of 1921–22

He was only released after the February Revolution in 1917. He was active in Samara during the Russian Civil War. He supported the Workers' Opposition. He was Commissar of the Military Revolutionary Committee of the Railway Telegraph and Commissar of Labour of Samara Governorate. He was also provisional chair of the Samara Goverbate Cheka. He was advocate of the Proletkult movement. Then he served as secretary of the Samara Soviet. He was also a member of the editorial board of the newspaper Soldatskaia Pravda (Samara).

== 10th Party Congress ==
In March 1921 he attended the 10th Congress of the Russian Communist Party (b) where he claimed that the Communist Party was ceasing to be a workers party.
