= Jack Latchford =

English cricketer (1909–1980)

Personal information
- Full name: John Richard Latchford
- Born: 16 June 1909; Delph, Yorkshire, England
- Died: 30 April 1980 (aged 70); Omagh, County Tyrone, Northern Ireland
- Batting: Right-handed
- Bowling: Right-arm medium

Domestic team information
- Years: Team
- 1935–1939: Durham
- 1930–1932: Lancashire

Career statistics
Competition	First-class
Matches	7
Runs scored	154
Batting average	15.40
100s/50s	–/1
Top score	63
Balls bowled	585
Wickets	4
Bowling average	45.25
5 wickets in innings	–
10 wickets in match	–
Best bowling	1/6
Catches/stumpings	4/–
- Source: Cricinfo, 11 August 2011

John Richard Latchford (16 June 1909 – 30 April 1980) was an English cricketer. Latchford was a right-handed batsman who bowled right-arm medium pace. He was born in Delph, Saddleworth, Yorkshire.

Having played for the Lancashire Seconds in the Minor Counties Championship since 1927, Latchford eventually made his first-class debut for the county against the Minor Counties in 1930. He made 6 further first-class appearances, the last of which came against Middlesex in the 1932 County Championship. In his 7 first-class matches for Lancashire, he scored 154 runs at an average of 15.40, with a high score of 63. This score, his only first-class fifty, came against Gloucestershire in the 1931 County Championship. With the ball, he took 4 wickets at a bowling average of 45.25, with best figures of 1/6. He left Lancashire at the end of the 1933 season.

He later joined Durham, making his debut for the county against the Yorkshire Second XI in the 1935 Minor Counties Championship. He played Minor counties cricket for Durham from 1935 to 1939, making 22 appearances. Latchford died in Omagh, County Tyrone, Northern Ireland on 30 April 1980.
