= Tadashi Hyōdō =

- 兵頭精
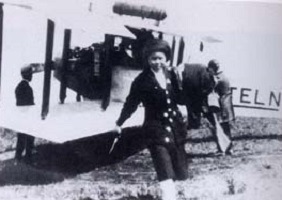
- Born: Tadashi Hyōdō; 6 April 1899; Kihoku, Ehime
- Died: April 23, 1980 (aged 81)
- Education: Seibi High School
- Known for: the first Japanese woman to gain a pilot's licence.
- Aviation career
- Flight license: 21 March 1922; 3

Tadashi Hyōdō (兵頭 精, Hyōdō Tadashi; April 6, 1899 – April 23, 1980) was the first Japanese woman to gain a pilot's licence.

== Life ==
Born in a village in Kita Uwa-gun, Ehime Prefecture (presently Kihoku, Ehime) on 6 April 1899, Tadashi Hyōdō's abilities were recognized early and she moved from her local elementary school to the senior year at Seibi Girls' Higher School in Matsuyama, Ehime's capital city. Her father, Rintarō had hoped to be a pilot but instead made it his hobby to sketch airplane designs: after his death, she aimed to be a pilot, to fulfill her father's dream. After graduating from high school, with her family wishing her to become either a medical practitioner or a teacher, she went to Osaka in January 1919 to become an apprentice pharmacist.

== Tsudanuma aviation school ==
With support from Kazoe, her elder sister, Tadashi was trained to fly at an aviation school in Tsudanuma managed by Otojirō Itō. Since a woman student at aviation school itself was so rare in those days, she was in newspapers when admitted to Itō's school, with articles read; "... a petite girl, round-faced and chubby, but a tomboy like a boy..." It is said that the tuition at those days cost "two yen per minute", when a new college graduate earned 40 yen per month in early 1910s. She worked time to time to earn enough for tuition, and it took her three and a half years to finish the course which trainees usually graduate in six months' time. She was the 15th trainee to finish the Tsudanuma aviation school and the first woman.

During her days at training, she attracted media attention and was the subject of a first page newspaper article and featured on air journals. She was steadily working on to master maintenance as well as joining lectures among male trainees. She survived several accidents including a crash gliding from 3000 meters high in 1911 without serious injury but part of airplane's leg was damaged, or on other occasion, an emergency water landing.

It was in April 1921 when the Aviation Regulations 航空取締規則 (Kōkū torishimari kisoku) was promulgated in Japan, and after the pilot licensing system 操縦免許制 (Sōjū menkyosei) was established, she was licensed a third-class airplane aviator (License no.38) on March 21, 1922 on her second challenge, and became the first woman aviator in Japan. The same year and soon after obtaining her aviation license, Hyōdō participated in the flight competition for the third-class aviators hosted by the Imperial Aeronautical Association 帝国飛行協会 (Teikoku Kōkū Kyōkai) ja:日本航空協会. She was the 10th out of 15 in the speed category.

Being the first woman pilot in Japan, she was exposed as scandalous figure out of curiosity and criticism that she was seeing a Mr. Tomita, a married lawyer from the same hometown, and with that false accusation, she was expelled from the Imperial Aeronautical Association. It also coincided with the Great Kanto Earthquake which made a huge impact on the society and industries, her figure disappeared from the aviation circle very abruptly, and never seen flying again. Tadashi Hyōdō planned to set up an aviation school of her own, and aimed for a lawyer later. She died at the age of 81 on April 23, 1980.

== Bibliography ==
- ひょうどう-ただし【兵頭精】 [Hyōdō Tadashi] (in Japanese). NetAdvance Inc.
- Hyōdō, Tadashi (1920). 父の遺志をついで靑き空へ [To fulfill my father's dream] (in Japanese). Vol. 13. Jitsugyo no Nihon Sha. p. 18. OCLC 459013361.
- Hiraki, Kunio (1977a) [1955]. Kantosha (ed.). "兵頭精女史の半生（上）" [Hyōdō Tadashi and her early life: part 1]. 世界航空機年鑑 Sekai kōkūki nenkan 1955 (Aireview The world aircraft annual). Kōkū jōhō (in Japanese). No. 380. Sekireisha. pp. 56–63. ISSN 0450-6669. OCLC 852478071.
- Hiraki, Kunio (1977b). Kantosha (ed.). "兵頭精女史の半生（下）" [Hyōdō Tadashi and her early life: part 2]. 世界航空機年鑑 Sekai kōkūki nenkan 1956 (Aireview The world aircraft annual). Kōkū jōhō, 52 (in Japanese). No. 381. Sekireisha. pp. 90–96. ISSN 0450-6669. OCLC 33738209.
- "是非お許しを受けて立派な飛行家に・死んだお父さんの書き残した物を見て志を立てた兵頭精子さんの話" [Hyōdō Tadashi, my dream to become a good aviator. A woman's story to aspire to an aviator when she read her late father's note]. 新聞集成大正編年史 大正8年度版 ： 下 Shinbun shūsei Taishō hennenshi (Newspapers during Taisho 8, third part) (in Japanese). 380 (3). 明治大正昭和新聞研究会 Meiji Taishō Shōwa Shinbun Kenkyūkai: 481. 1981 [1919]. OCLC 672888900.
- "日本最初の女飛行家生る ： 兵頭精子" [Hyōdō Tadashi, the first woman aviator was born]. 新聞集成大正編年史 大正11年度版・上 Shinbun shūsei taishō hennenshi (Newspapers during Taisho 11, first part) (in Japanese) (1). 明治大正昭和新聞研究会 Meiji Taisho Showa shinbun kenkyukai: 761. 1983 [1922]. OCLC 672828056.
- "駈落をした女飛行家兵頭精子を除名決議 ： 千葉" [Hyōdō Tadashi Expelled; the female aviator ran away with her lover. Chiba]. 新聞集成大正編年史 大正11年度版 下 Shinbun shūsei taishō hennenshi (Newspapers during Taisho 11, third part) (in Japanese) (3). 明治大正昭和新聞研究会 Meiji Taisho Showa shinbun kenkyukai: 27. 1984 [1922]. OCLC 673283687.
