= 1980 in the United Kingdom =

Events from the year 1980 in the United Kingdom.

== Incumbents ==
- Monarch – Elizabeth II
- Prime Minister – Margaret Thatcher (Conservative)

== Events ==
=== January ===
- 2 January – Workers at British Steel Corporation go on a nationwide strike over pay called by the Iron and Steel Trades Confederation, which has some 90,000 members among British Steel's 150,000 workforce, in a bid to get a 20% rise. It is the first steelworks strike since 1926.
- 19 January – The first UK Indie Chart is published in Record Business.
- 20 January – The British record television audience for a film is set when some 23,500,000 viewers tune in for the ITV showing of the James Bond film Live and Let Die (1973).
- 21 January – MS Athina B is beached at Brighton.
- 28 January – Granada Television airs a controversial edition of World in Action on ITV, in which it alleges that Manchester United F.C. chairman Louis Edwards has made unauthorised payments to the parents of some of the club's younger players and has made shady deals to win local council meat contracts for his retail outlet chain.

=== February ===
- 14 February – Margaret Thatcher announces that state benefit to strikers will be halved.
- 14–23 February – Great Britain and Northern Ireland compete at the Winter Olympics in Lake Placid, New York, United States, and win one gold medal (Robin Cousins for figure skating).
- 17 February – British Steel Corporation announces that more than 11,000 jobs will be axed at its plants in Wales by the end of next month.
- 25 February
  - The first episode of the popular political sitcom Yes Minister is broadcast on BBC2 television.
  - Manchester United chairman Louis Edwards dies from a heart attack at the age of 65, just weeks after allegations about his dealings in connection with the football club and with his retail outlet chain.

=== March ===
- 10 March – An opinion poll conducted by the Evening Standard suggests that six out of 10 Britons are dissatisfied with Margaret Thatcher's Conservative government, who now trail Labour (still led by James Callaghan, the former prime minister) in the opinion polls.
- 13 March – The Southend East by-election caused by the death of Stephen McAdden the previous year is held; Teddy Taylor holds the seat for the Conservatives.
- 19–20 March – Radio Caroline, the "pirate radio" station, is forced to cease transmission when MV Mi Amigo, the ship on which it is based, runs aground and sinks off the Thames Estuary.
- 25 March
  - The British Olympic Association votes to defy the government by sending athletes to the Olympic Games to be held in Moscow, USSR in the summer.
  - Robert Runcie enthroned as Archbishop of Canterbury.
- 26 March – The budget raises tax allowances and duties on petrol, alcohol and tobacco.
- 31 March
  - British Leyland agrees to sell the MG cars factory at Abingdon to a consortium headed by Aston Martin-Lagonda when the plant closes this Autumn.
  - National Heritage Act sets up the National Heritage Memorial Fund.
- March – Vauxhall launches the Astra, a front-wheel drive small family hatchback which replaces the recently discontinued Viva and is based on the latest Opel Kadett. Although the car is currently produced in West Germany and Belgium, there are plans for British production to commence at the Ellesmere Port plant in Cheshire next year.

=== April ===
- 1 April
  - The steelworkers' strike is called off.
  - Britain's first official naturist beach is opened to the public in Brighton.
- 2 April – 1980 St Pauls riot in Bristol.
- 3 April – Education Act institutes the Assisted Places Scheme (free or subsidised places for children attending fee-paying independent schools based on results in the schools' entrance examination and means tests), gives parents greater powers on governing bodies and over admissions, and removes local education authorities' obligation to provide school milk and meals.
- 4 April – Alton Towers Resort is opened by Madame Tussauds in Staffordshire as a theme park.
- 6 April – The modernised Glasgow Subway is re-opened to the public, with new trains and renovated stations.
- 10 April – The UK reaches an agreement with Spain to reopen its border with Gibraltar.
- 18 April – Zimbabwe becomes independent of the United Kingdom.
- 22 April – Unemployment stands at a two-year high of more than 1.5million.
- 29 April – Filmmaker Sir Alfred Hitchcock dies aged 80 at his home in Los Angeles, only one month after his last public appearance.
- 30 April
  - The Iranian Embassy Siege begins. A six-man terrorist team from the Democratic Revolutionary Front for the Liberation of Arabistan captures the Embassy of Iran in Prince's Gate, Knightsbridge, central London, taking 26 hostages.
  - Labour MP Thomas McMillan, 61, dies in hospital in London following a fall from a bus in the city two weeks previously.

=== May ===
- 1 May – British Aerospace privatised.
- 3 May – Liverpool win the Football League First Division title for 12th time.
- 5 May – The SAS storm the Iranian Embassy building, killing 5 out of the 6 terrorists. One hostage is killed by the terrorists before the raid and one during it, but the remainder are freed. The events are broadcast live on television.
- 10 May – West Ham United, of the Second Division, win the FA Cup for the third time in its history with a surprise 1–0 victory over First Division Arsenal in the final at Wembley Stadium. Trevor Brooking scores the only goal of the game to make West Ham United the third team from the Second Division to have won the trophy in the last eight years. As of 2021, West Ham are the last team from outside the top division to have won the FA Cup.
- 16 May – Inflation has risen to 21.8%.
- 27 May – Inquest into the death of New Zealand born teacher Blair Peach (who was killed during a demonstration against the National Front last year) returns a verdict of misadventure, resulting in a public outcry.
- 28 May – Nottingham Forest retain the European Cup with a 1–0 win over Hamburger SV, the West German league champions, in Madrid. The winning goal is scored by Scotland international John Robertson. The European Cup has now been won by an English club for the fourth successive year, as Liverpool won it for two consecutive years before Forest's first victory last year.

=== June ===
- June
  - British Leyland announces its Morris Ital range of family saloons and estates - a restyled and re-engineered version of the nine-year-old Marina that was one of Britain's most popular cars during the 1970s. Production is expected to finish by 1984 when an all-new front-wheel drive model is added to the range. Official sales are due to begin on 1 August, the same day that the new W-registered cars go on sale.
  - The UK economy slides into recession.
- 6 June – Two Malaysian men are jailed for 14 years after being found guilty of running a drug smuggling ring in London which generated millions of pounds.
- 12 June – Gail Kinchen (a pregnant 16-year-old) and her unborn baby are accidentally shot dead by a police marksman who enters the Birmingham flat where her boyfriend David Pagett is holding her hostage at gunpoint.
- 17 June – Secretary of State for Defence Francis Pym reveals to the House of Commons that US nuclear cruise missiles are to be located at RAF Greenham Common in Berkshire and the disused RAF Molesworth base in Cambridgeshire.
- 19 June – Gunmen attack the British embassy in Iraq; three unknown attackers are shot dead by Iraqi security forces.
- 23 June – Insider trading in shares becomes illegal under United Kingdom company law.
- 24 June – Unemployment is announced to have reached a postwar high of 1,600,000.
- 26 June – The Glasgow Central by-election, caused by the death of Thomas McMillan on 30 April, is held, with Labour retaining its hold on the seat despite a swing of 14% to the Scottish National Party.
- 30 June – The pre-decimal sixpence coin is withdrawn from circulation.

=== July ===
- 1 July – MG's Abingdon car factory looks set to close completely later this year as Aston Martin fails to raise the funds to buy it from British Leyland.
- 8 July – Miners threatening to strike demand a 37% pay increase, ignoring pleas from Margaret Thatcher to hold down wage claims.
- 10 July – Alexandra Palace in London gutted by fire.
- 19 July–3 August – Great Britain and Northern Ireland compete at the Olympics in Moscow and win 5 gold, 7 silver and 9 bronze medals.
- 22 July – Unemployment has hit a 44-year high of nearly 1.9 million.
- 24 July – Actor, singer and comedian Peter Sellers dies aged 54 of heart failure in London, shortly after dining with his fellow Goons Harry Secombe and Spike Milligan.
- 29 July – Margaret Thatcher announces the introduction of Enterprise Zones as an employment relief effort in some of regions of Britain which have been hardest hit by deindustrialisation and unemployment.

=== August ===
- 11 August
  - Margaret Thatcher visits the Harold Hill area of East London to hand of the keys to the 12,000th council tenants in Britain to buy their home under the right to buy scheme. However, she is met by jeering from neighbours of the family.
  - Tyne and Wear Metro opens on Tyneside after six years of construction, with the first phase between Haymarket in Newcastle and Whitley Bay. The light rail network is expected to grow throughout the 1980s.
- 16 August – 37 people die as a result of the Denmark Place fire, arson at adjacent London nightclubs.
- 20 August – Peter Sutcliffe victims: 47-year-old civil servant Marguerite Walls is murdered in Farsley, Leeds, by the "Yorkshire Ripper", Peter Sutcliffe, who at this time is awaiting trial for drink driving.
- 28 August – Unemployment now stands at 2 million for the first time since 1935. Economists warn that it could rise to up to 2.5 million by the end of next year.

=== September ===
- 1 September – Ford launches one of the most important new cars of the year, the third generation Escort which is a technological innovation in the small family car market, spelling the end of the traditional rear-wheel drive saloon in favour of the front-wheel drive hatchback and estate that follows a trend in this sector of car which is being repeated all over Western Europe. It will go on to be Britain's best-selling car of the decade starting from 1982.
- 9 September – Bibby Line's Liverpool-registered ore-bulk-oil carrier MV Derbyshire sinks with the loss of all 44 crew south off Japan in Typhoon Orchid following structural failure. At 91,655 gross tons, she is the largest UK-registered ship ever lost.
- 11 September – Chicago mobster Joseph Scalise with Arthur Rachel commit the Marlborough diamond robbery in London. The following day, they are arrested in Chicago after getting off a British Airways flight in the city; however, the 45-carat stone is never found.
- 12 September – Consett Steelworks in Consett, County Durham closes with the loss of some 4500 jobs, instantly making it the town with the highest rate of unemployment in the UK.
- 13 September – Hercules, a bear which had gone missing on a Scottish island filming a Kleenex advertisement, is found.
- 21 September
  - First CND rally at RAF Greenham Common.
  - A Douglas A-26 Invader aircraft crashes during an air show at Biggin Hill Airport near London, and all seven people on board are killed.
- 24 September – Peter Sutcliffe victims: 34-year-old Singapore-born doctor Upadhya Bandara is attacked and injured in Headingley, Leeds.

=== October ===
- 3 October – The 1980 Housing Act comes into effect, giving council house tenants of at least three years' standing in England and Wales the right to buy their home from their local council at a discount.
- 6 October – Deregulation of express coach services.
- 8 October – British Leyland launches the Austin Metro, a small three-door hatchback which makes use of much of the Mini's drivetrain and suspension, including its 998 cc and 1275 cc engines. The Mini will continue to be produced alongside the Metro at Longbridge in Birmingham which was recently expanded to accommodate Metro production.
- 10 October – Margaret Thatcher makes her "The lady's not for turning" speech to the Conservative Party conference after party MP's warn that her economic policy was responsible for the current recession and rising unemployment.
- 15 October
  - James Callaghan, ousted as prime minister by the Conservative victory 17 months ago, resigns as Labour Party leader after four and a half years.
  - Former Conservative prime minister Harold Macmillan, 86, criticises Margaret Thatcher's economic policies, claiming that she has "got the wrong answer" to the economic crises which she inherited from Labour last year. Her economic policies are also criticised by union leaders, who blame her policies for rising unemployment and bankruptcies, and warn that this could result in civil unrest.
- 17 October – Elizabeth II makes history by becoming the first British monarch to make a state visit to the Vatican.
- 22 October – Lord Thomson announces that The Times and Sunday Times will be closed down within five months unless a buyer is found.
- 24 October – MG car production ends after 56 years with the closure of the plant in Abingdon, Oxfordshire, where more than 1.1 million MG cars have been built since it opened in 1924.
- 25 October – Peter Sutcliffe victims: University student Maureen Lea is savagely attacked in Leeds.
- 28 October – Margaret Thatcher declares that the government will not give in to seven jailed IRA terrorists who are on hunger strike in the Maze Prison in hope of winning prisoner of war status.
- 31 October – The Night Ferry rail service linking London with Paris in France ends after 44 years (excluding World War II).

=== November ===
- 5 November – Peter Sutcliffe victims: Theresa Sykes, a 16-year-old Huddersfield mother of a young baby, is savagely wounded in an attack near her home in the town.
- 10 November – Michael Foot is elected Leader of the Labour Party.
- 13 November – George Smith, a security guard, is shot dead when the van he is guarding is intercepted by armed robbers in Willenhall, West Midlands.
- 17 November – Peter Sutcliffe victims: University student Jacqueline Hill, aged 20, is murdered in Headingley, Leeds. On 19 November, police investigating the case establish that she is probably the 13th woman to be killed by Sutcliffe; she will be his last confirmed victim.
- 23 November – Despite the economy now being in recession and the government's monetarist economic policy to tackle inflation being blamed for the downturn, the government announces further public spending cuts and taxation rises.

=== December ===
- 8 December – Ex-Beatle John Lennon, 40, is shot dead in New York.
- 10 December – Frederick Sanger wins his second Nobel Prize in Chemistry, jointly with Walter Gilbert, "for their contributions concerning the determination of base sequences in nucleic acids".
- 12 December – Lord Kagan, a friend of former Prime Minister Harold Wilson, is convicted of financial offences in connection with his Yorkshire-based textile business and jailed.
- 14 December – Thousands of music fans hold a 10-minute vigil in Liverpool for John Lennon.
- 18 December – Michael Foot's hopes of becoming prime minister in the next general election are given a boost by an MORI poll which shows Labour on 56% with a 24-point lead over the Conservatives.
- 23 December – American animated special Rudolph the Red-Nosed Reindeer airs on ITV for the last time, rivaling The Nine O’Clock News.
- 26 & 28 December – Sightings of unexplained lights near RAF Woodbridge Suffolk, which become known as the Rendlesham Forest incident, the most well-known claimed UFO event in Britain.
- 28 December – The Independent Broadcasting Authority award contracts for commercial broadcasting on ITV. TV-am is awarded the first ever breakfast TV contract, and is set to go on air by 1983.

=== Undated ===
- Inflation has risen to 18% as Margaret Thatcher's battle against inflation is still in its early stages.
- The economy contracts throughout the year, shrinking by 4% overall with the greatest decline occurring in the second quarter of the year at 1.8%.
- Britain becomes self-sufficient in oil.
- Transcendental Meditation movement community established in Skelmersdale.

== Publications ==
- Douglas Adams' novel The Restaurant at the End of the Universe, second of The Hitchhiker's Guide to the Galaxy "trilogy".
- Pam Adams' children's book Mrs Honey's Hat.
- Janet and Allan Ahlberg's children's book Funnybones.
- Julian Barnes' first novel Metroland.
- Anthony Burgess's novel Earthly Powers.
- The Church of England's Alternative Service Book.
- William Golding's novel Rites of Passage, first of the To the Ends of the Earth trilogy.
- Eric Hill's children's book Where's Spot?.
- David Lodge's novel How Far Can You Go?.
- Iris Murdoch's novel Nuns and Soldiers.
- Barry Unsworth's novel Pascali's Island.
- Benjamin Zephaniah's first poetry collection Pen Rhythm.

== Births ==
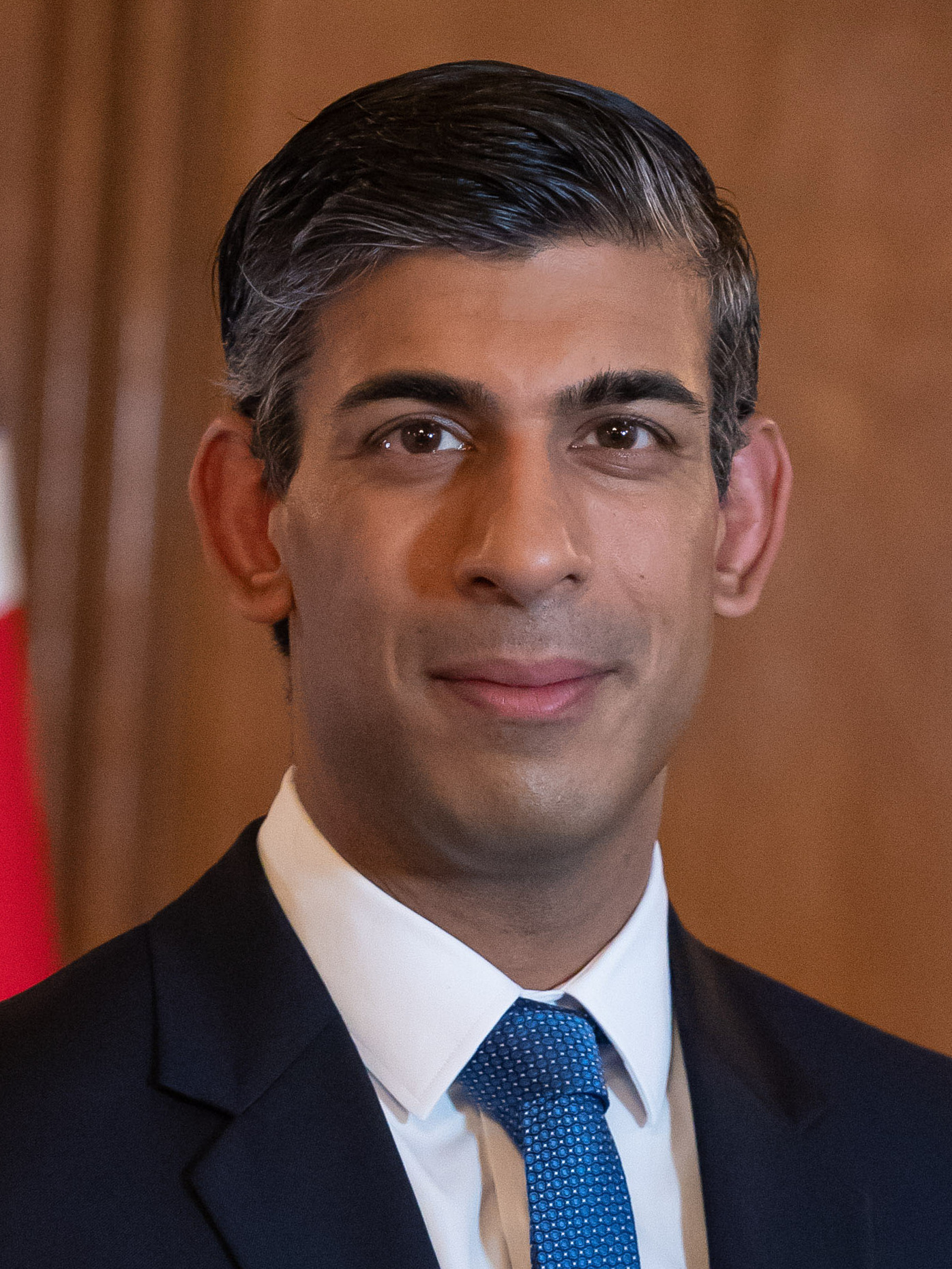
Rishi Sunak

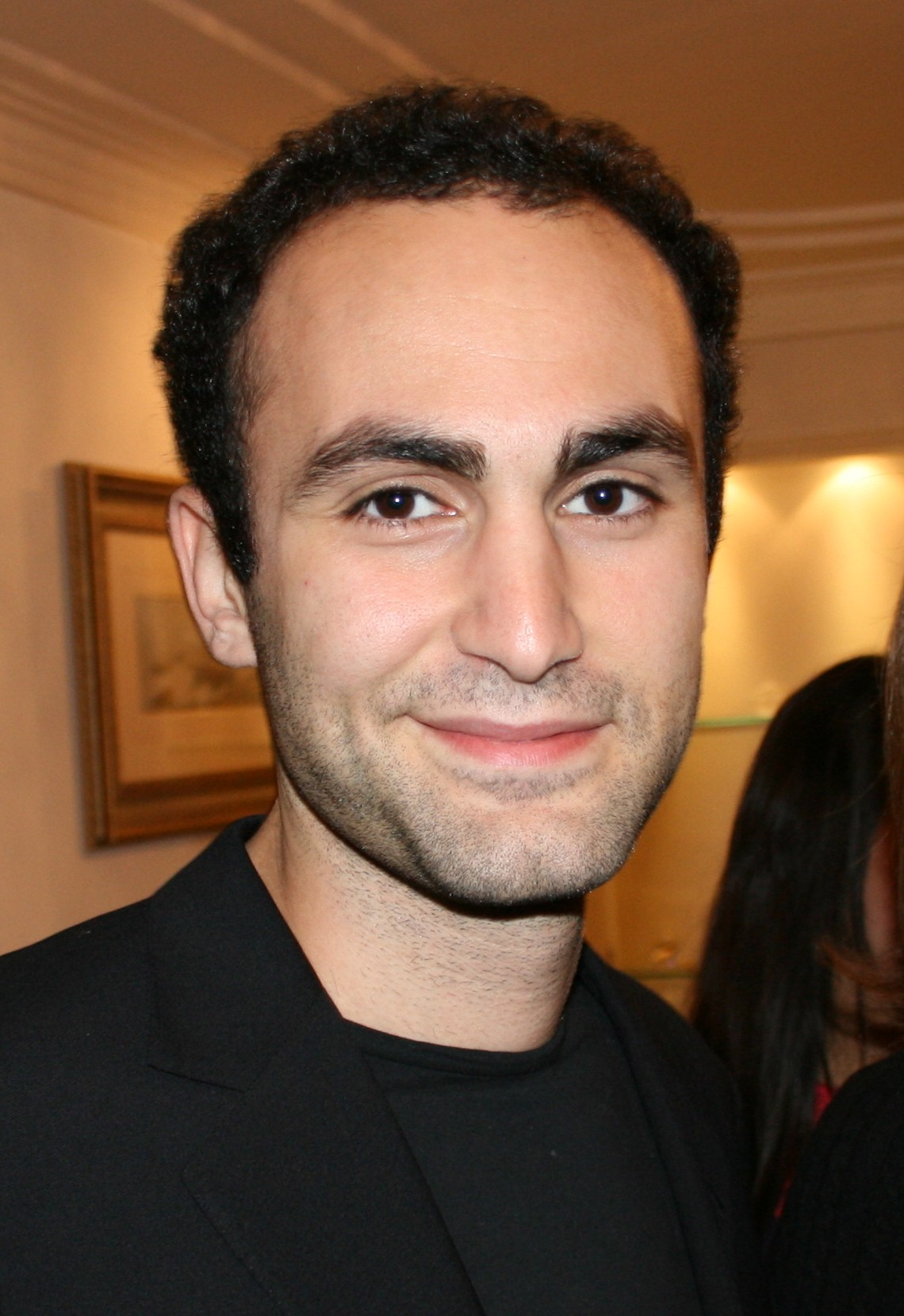
Khalid Abdalla

- 1 January – Richie Faulkner, rock guitarist (Judas Priest)
- 2 January – Kemi Badenoch, politician
- 8 January – Sam Riley, actor
- 18 January – Estelle, singer
- 19 January – D Double E, grime MC
- 20 January
  - Jenson Button, racing driver
  - Matthew Tuck, singer-songwriter and frontman for Bullet for My Valentine
- 21 January – Nicky Booth, boxer (died 2021)
- 26 January – Tom Skinner, alternative rock/jazz drummer and record producer
- 30 January – Leilani Dowding, English 'Page 3' model and television celebrity
- 31 January – Clarissa Ward, television journalist
- 5 February – Jo Swinson, Scottish politician, leader of the Liberal Democrats (UK)
- 10 February
  - Matt Irwin, photographer (died 2016)
  - Ralf Little, footballer and actor
  - Steve Tully, footballer
- 19 February – David Gandy, model
- 22 February – Martin Garratt, footballer (died 2014)
- 2 March – Chris Barker, footballer (died 2020)
- 13 March – Linda Clement, Scottish field hockey player
- 21 March – John Hinds, Northern Irish motorcycle race doctor, antitheist and lecturer (died 2015)
- 23 March – Russell Howard, English comedian, television and radio presenter
- 24 March – Amanda Davies, sports presenter
- 28 March – Angela Rayner, Labour politician
- 29 March – Andy Scott-Lee, Welsh singer (3SL) and Pop Idol (series 2) contestant
- 3 April – Suella Braverman, Conservative politician, Home Secretary
- 8 April
  - Ben Freeman, actor
  - Cheryl Valentine, Scottish field hockey midfielder
- 15 April – Natalie Casey, English actress
- 25 April – Lee Spick, snooker player (died 2015)
- 28 April – Bradley Wiggins, cyclist
- 2 May – Zat Knight, English footballer
- 8 May – Michelle McManus, Scottish singer, winner of Pop Idol (series 2) and television host
- 9 May – Kate Richardson-Walsh, English field hockey player
- 12 May – Rishi Sunak, Conservative politician, former prime minister
- 22 May – Lucy Gordon, actress and model (died 2009)
- 30 May – Steven Gerrard, footballer
- 1 June
  - Martin Devaney, footballer
  - Oliver James, actor
- 2 June – Richard Skuse, rugby player
- 4 June – Philip Olivier, actor
- 10 June
  - Jovanka Houska, chess master
  - James Walsh, singer-songwriter, guitarist and pianist
- 11 June
  - Ernie Cooksey, footballer (died 2008)
  - Michael Lockett, soldier (died 2009)
- 12 June – Adam Kay, writer and doctor
- 22 June – Charlene White, television presenter and newsreader
- 23 June – Jessica Taylor, singer (Liberty X)
- 29 June – Katherine Jenkins, mezzo-soprano
- 1 July – Ricky Champ, actor
- 7 July – Jim McMahon, politician
- 8 July – Nikesh Shukla, author
- 18 July
  - Gareth Emery, trance producer and DJ
  - Tasmin Lucia-Khan, television news presenter
  - Scott James Remnant, engineer
- 19 July – Michelle Heaton, English singer (Liberty X)
- 28 July – Leo Houlding, English rock climber
- 3 August – Hannah Simone, British-Canadian actress
- 15 August - Bob Hardy, bassist (Franz Ferdinand)
- 19 August
  - Adam Campbell, actor
  - Darius Campbell Danesh, Scottish singer-songwriter and actor (died 2022 in the United States)
- 23 August – Joanne Froggatt, stage actress
- 28 August – Rachel Khoo, chef, writer and broadcaster
- 4 September – Michael Beale, football coach
- 6 September – Kerry Katona, television presenter and pop star (Atomic Kitten)
- 11 September – Anthony Carrigan, academic (died 2016)
- 12 September – Kevin Sinfield, English rugby league player
- 18 September – Adeel Akhtar, actor
- 5 October – James Toseland, English motorcycle racer
- 13 October – Scott Parker, English footballer and manager
- 14 October – Ben Whishaw, actor
- 26 October – Khalid Abdalla, Scottish-born actor
- 28 October – Alan Smith, footballer
- 12 November – Charlie Hodgson, English rugby union player
- 18 November – Mathew Baynton, English actor
- 19 November
  - Andrew Copson, businessman
  - Adele Silva, actress
- 6 December – Steve Lovell, footballer
- 7 December – John Terry, footballer
- 8 December – Nick Nevern, actor and director
- 15 December
  - Neil McDermott, actor
  - Sergio Pizzorno, guitarist and songwriter
- 16 December – Michael Jibson, actor, voice-over artist, writer and director
- 18 December – Neil Fingleton, actor and basketball player (died 2017)
- 20 December
  - Steve Coast, entrepreneur, founder of OpenStreetMap
  - Ashley Cole, footballer
  - Fitz Hall, footballer
- 21 December – Louise Linton, Scottish actress, wife of Steven Mnuchin
- 25 December – Laura Sadler, television actress (died 2003)

== Deaths ==
=== January ===
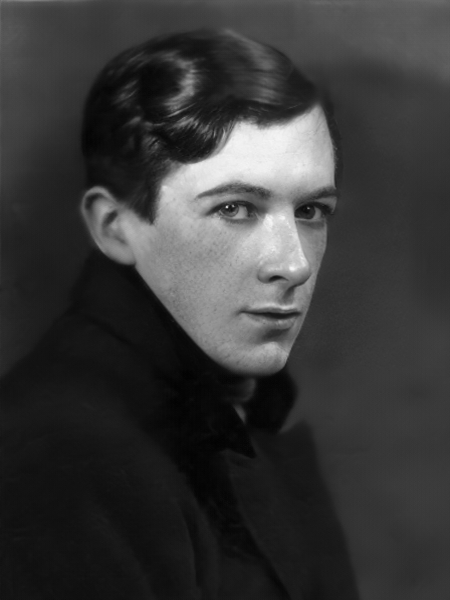
Cecil Beaton

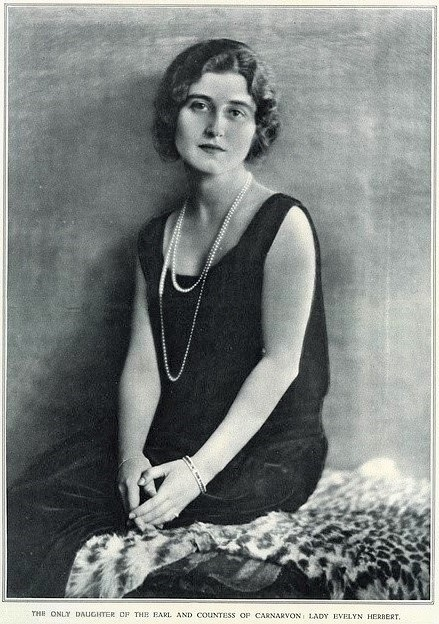
Lady Evelyn Beauchamp

- 2 January
  - Phyllis Barclay-Smith, ornithologist (born 1902)
  - Susan Beatrice Pearse, illustrator (born 1878)
- 3 January
  - George Sutherland Fraser, poet, critic and academic (born 1915)
  - Colin Keith-Johnston, actor (born 1896)
- 5 January – Sir Roy Bucher, Army general (born 1895)
- 6 January
  - Raymond Mays, racing car driver and businessman (born 1899)
  - Sir Francis Hill, solicitor and historian (born 1899)
- 7 January – Cyril Mann, painter and sculptor (born 1911)
- 9 January
  - Sir Charles Curran, television executive (born 1921 in Ireland)
  - Raymond Mortimer, writer on art and literature (born 1895)
- 10 January – Sir Charles Drummond Ellis, physicist (born 1895)
- 11 January
  - Barbara Pym, novelist (born 1913)
  - Maurice Reckitt, Christian socialist writer (born 1888)
- 14 January – Ernest Alexander Payne, Baptist minister (born 1902)
- 15 January
  - Kim Bruce-Lockhart, squash player (born 1946)
  - David Whitfield, singer (born 1926)
- 17 January – Sir Reginald Goff, judge (born 1907)
- 18 January – Sir Cecil Beaton, photographer (born 1904)
- 20 January – William Roberts, painter (born 1895)
- 21 January
  - Sir George Pirie, RAF air chief marshal (born 1896)
  - Irene Rathbone, novelist (born 1892)
- 22 January
  - Walter Hall, Army lieutenant-colonel and politician (born 1891)
  - Joseph Stanley Snowden, politician (born 1901)
- 23 January – Frank A. Hoare, film producer (born 1894)
- 24 January – Sam Leitch, journalist and television presenter (born 1927)
- 25 January – Queenie Watts, actress and singer (born 1923)
- 27 January – Sir Eric Wyndham White, British administrator and economist, first Director-General of the GATT (born 1913)
- 28 January – Pat Griffith, racing driver (born 1926)
- 29 January
  - Sir Thomas Bennett, architect (born 1887)
  - Edward Lewis, businessman, chairman of Decca (born 1900)
  - Gordon Manley, climatologist (born 1902)
- 31 January
  - Lady Evelyn Beauchamp, Egyptologist and daughter of George Herbert, 5th Earl of Carnarvon (born 1901)
  - Arthur Mainwaring Bowen, philanthropist (born 1922)
  - John Crabbe Cunningham, climber (accident) (born 1927)

=== February ===
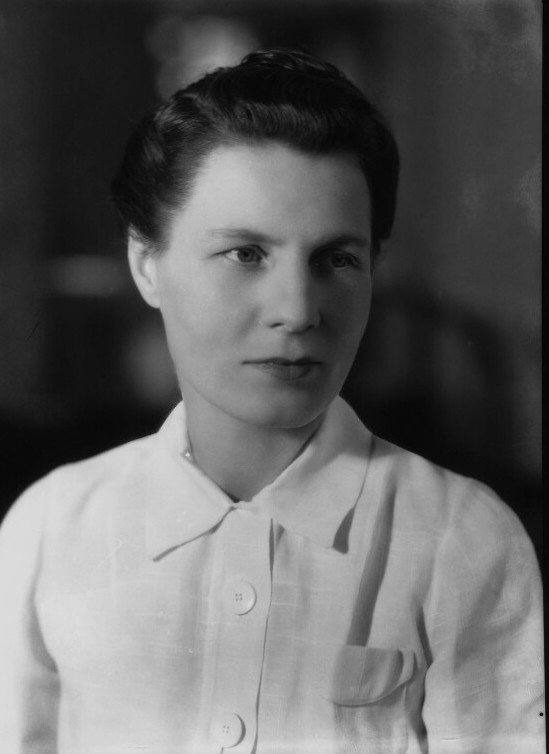
Edith Summerskill

- 1 February
  - John Armitage, British editor of Encyclopædia Britannica (born 1910)
  - Sir Patrick Hancock, diplomat (born 1914)
- 3 February – Betty Timms, author (born 1886)
- 4 February
  - Edith Summerskill, physician, feminist, Labour politician and campaigner (born 1901)
  - David Whitaker, television screenwriter (born 1928)
- 5 February – Sir Harold Parker, civil servant (born 1895)
- 6 February
  - Sir William Abraham, Army officer (born 1897)
  - Don Ross, theatre producer (born 1902)
- 8 February
  - E. P. Bottley, geologist (born 1904)
  - Miles Thomas, businessman (born 1897)
  - Leslie Welch, actor (born 1907)
- 9 February
  - Heron Carvic, actor (born 1913)
  - Renée Houston, actress (born 1902)
  - John Kennedy, cellist (born 1922)
  - Tom Macdonald, journalist and novelist (born 1900)
- 10 February – Albert Murray, Baron Murray of Gravesend, politician (born 1930)
- 11 February – Trena Cox, stained glass artist (born 1895)
- 12 February – Sylvia Leith-Ross, anthropologist (born 1884)
- 15 February – Sir Ernest Down, Army lieutenant-general (born 1902)
- 16 February
  - Geoffrey Hornblower Cock, World War I flying ace (born 1896)
  - Edward Copson, mathematician (born 1901)
  - Percy Legard, athlete (born 1906)
  - Arthur Loveridge, biologist and herpetologist (born 1891)
- 17 February – Graham Sutherland, artist (born 1903)
- 18 February – Muriel Brunskill, opera singer (born 1899)
- 19 February
  - Bruce Digby-Worsley, World War I air ace (born 1899)
  - R. C. S. Walters, civil engineer (born 1888 in New Zealand)
- 21 February – Kathleen Sampson, mycologist (born 1892)
- 24 February – Paul Wilson, Baron Wilson of High Wray, engineer (born 1908)
- 25 February
  - Louis Edwards, businessman and chairman of Manchester United (born 1914)
  - Caradog Prichard, Welsh poet (born 1904)
- 28 February
  - Michael Astor, politician (born 1916)
  - Ian Peebles, Scottish cricketer (born 1908)
- 29 February – Margaret Morris, dancer (born 1891)

=== March ===
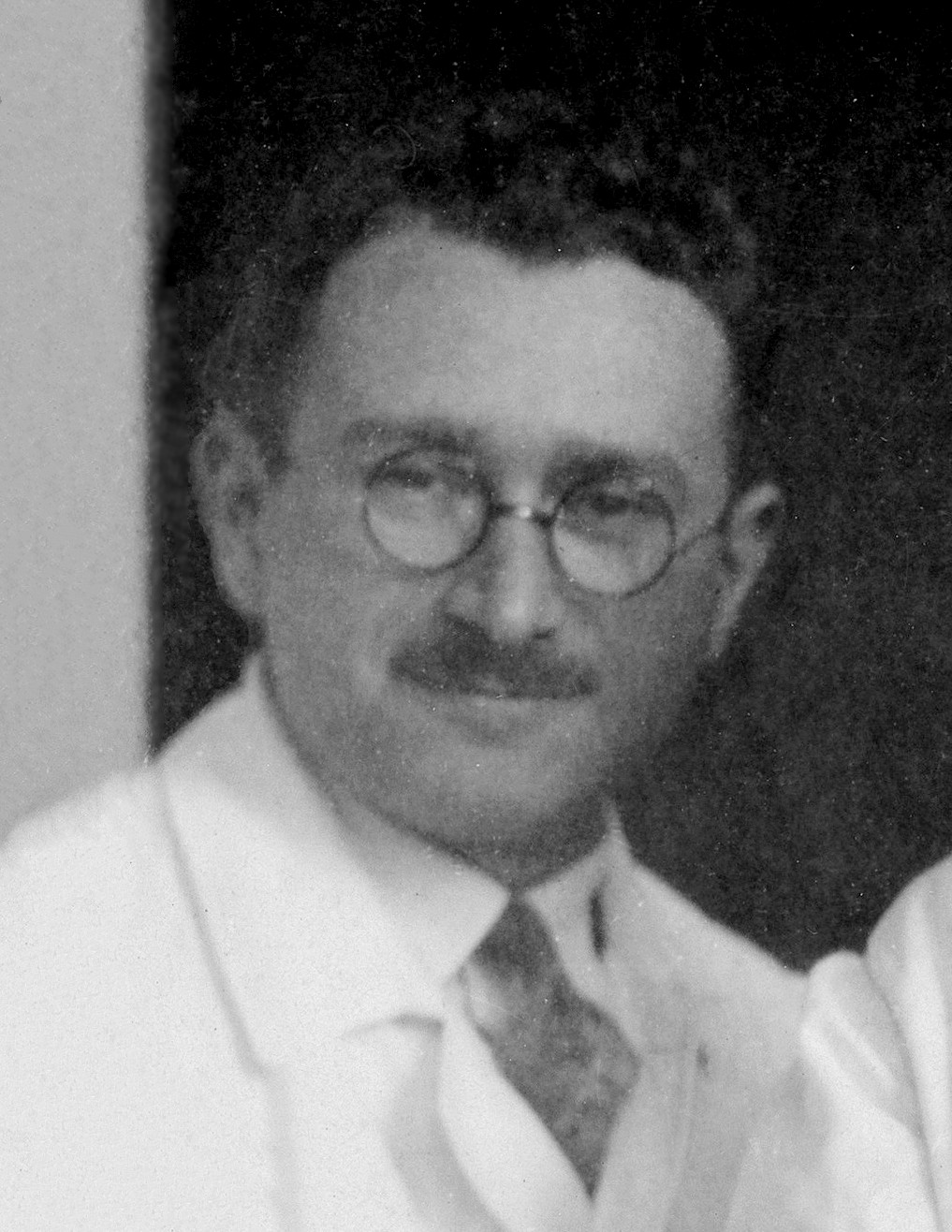
Ludwig Guttmann

- 1 March
  - Dixie Dean, English footballer (born 1907)
  - Eric Oliver, motorcycle racer (born 1911)
- 3 March – Sir Michael Duff, 3rd Baronet, socialite (born 1907)
- 4 March – Alan Hardaker, English footballer and football manager (born 1912)
- 5 March
  - Jack Gallagher, historian (born 1919)
  - John Raven, classical scholar (born 1914)
  - John Skeaping, sculptor and painter (born 1901)
- 6 March
  - Harry Becker, politician (born 1892)
  - Noel Croucher, businessman and philanthropist (born 1891)
  - Norman Preston, cricket journalist (born 1903)
  - E. A. Underwood, physician (born 1899)
- 7 March – John Illingworth, yachtsman, yacht designer and naval officer (born 1903)
- 14 March
  - Dudley Maurice Newitt, chemical engineer (born 1894)
  - Vere Temple, artist (born 1898)
- 15 March
  - Gerald Abrahams, chess player and barrister (born 1907)
  - Sir Cyril Harrison, businessman (born 1901)
- 17 March
  - Cyril Hamnett, Baron Hamnett, journalist and politician (born 1906)
  - P. M. Hubbard, novelist (born 1910)
- 18 March – Ludwig Guttmann, neurologist and pioneer of the Paralympic Games (born 1899 in Germany)
- 19 March
  - Charles Wood, 2nd Earl of Halifax, peer and politician (born 1912)
  - Reginald Smith-Rose, physicist (born 1894)
- 20 March – Alun Davies, historian (born 1916)
- 22 March – Evelyn Procter, historian (born 1897)
- 23 March
  - S. W. Alexander, journalist (born 1895)
  - Sir Henry McCall, Royal Navy admiral (born 1895)
  - Charles Pannell, Baron Pannell, politician (born 1902)
  - Joan Whittington, Red Cross aid worker (born 1907)
  - Norah Wilmot, racehorse trainer (born 1889)
- 24 March – John Barrie, actor (born 1917)
- 26 March
  - Basil Coad, Army major-general (born 1906)
  - Lily Newton, botanist (born 1893)
- 28 March – Sir Fenton Atkinson, judge who presided at the trial of the Moors murderers (born 1906)
- 30 March
  - Francis Douglas, 1st Baron Douglas of Barloch, journalist and politician (born 1889)
  - Jim Hammond, trade union leader and communist (born 1907)
- 31 March – John Nightingale, actor (born 1942)

=== April ===
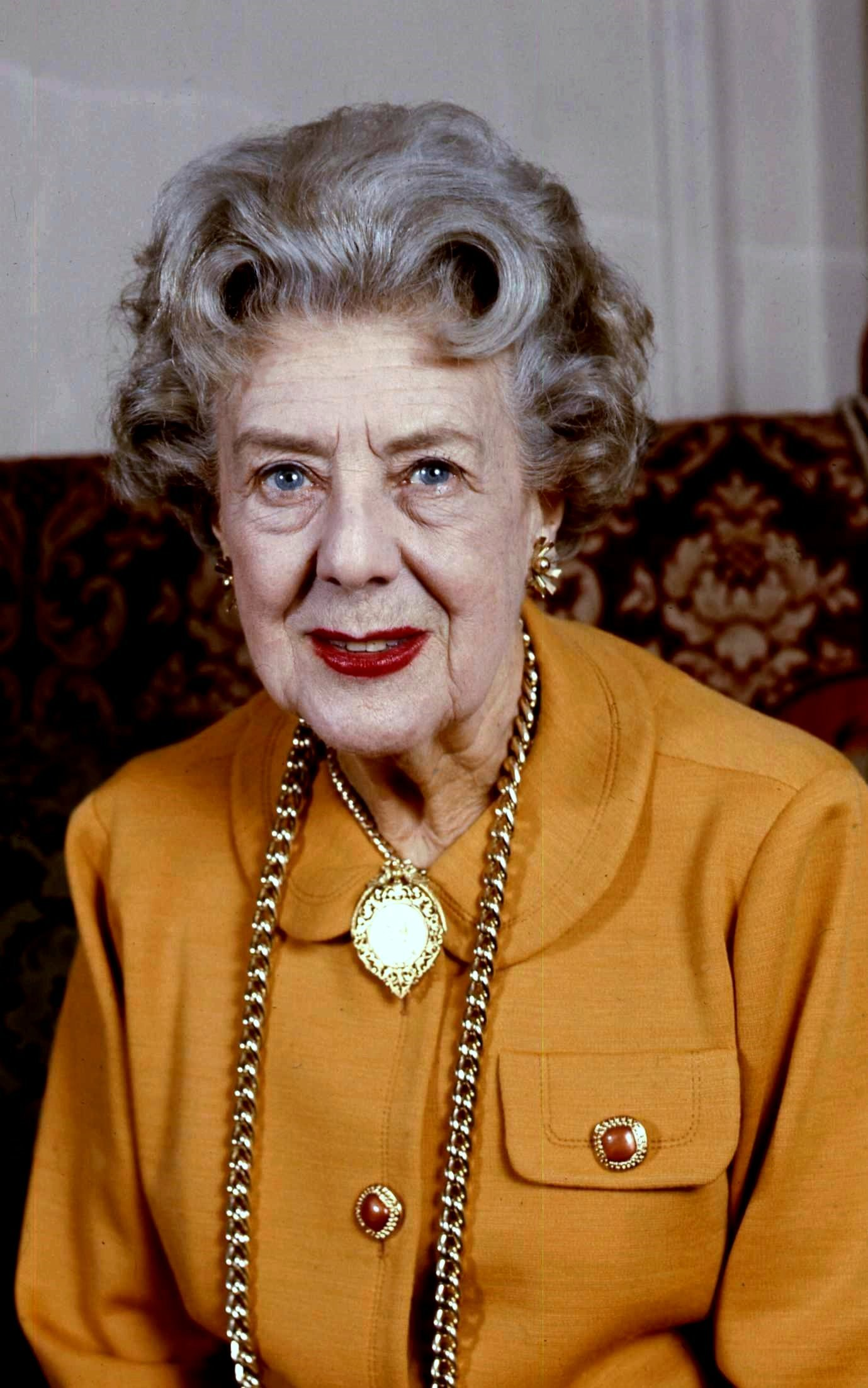
Cicely Courtneidge

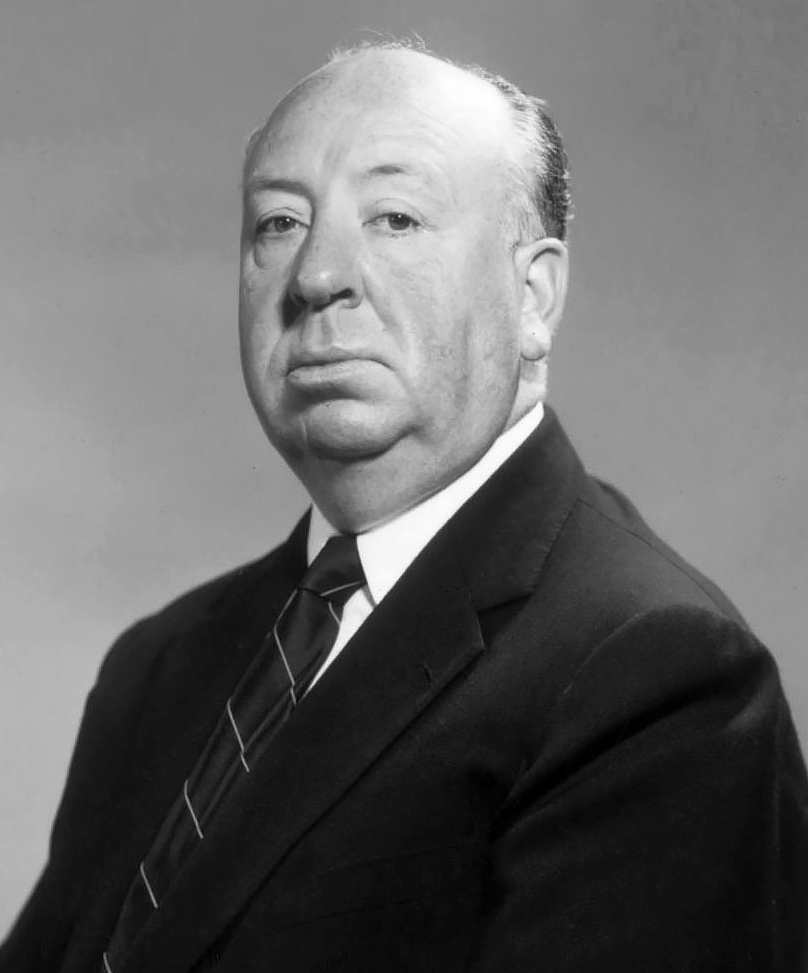
Alfred Hitchcock

- 1 April – Joyce Heron, actress (born 1916)
- 2 April – George Wallach, Scottish long-distance runner (born 1883)
- 3 April
  - Sir Edward Bullard, geophysicist (born 1907)
  - Isla Cameron, actress and singer (born 1927)
  - Sir Alexander Douglas Campbell, Army major-general (born 1899)
  - Ulick Richardson Evans, chemist (born 1889)
- 5 April – Hector MacAndrew, Scottish fiddler and composer (born 1903)
- 6 April
  - Antony Balch, film director (born 1937)
  - John Collier, writer (born 1901)
  - Sir Thomas Malcolm Knox, philosopher (born 1900)
- 7 April – Sir Lancelot Cutforth, Army major-general (born 1899)
- 8 April
  - Bill Eastman, Army brigadier-general (born 1911)
  - Beatrix Havergal, horticulturalist (born 1901)
- 10 April – Antonia White, writer and translator (born 1899)
- 11 April
  - Norman Hargreaves-Mawdsley, legal historian (born 1921)
  - Nicholas Phipps, actor (born 1913)
- 13 April – Sir Arthur Massey, physician (born 1894)
- 15 April
  - Sir Ian Campbell, Royal Navy vice-admiral (born 1898)
  - Catherine Salkeld, actress (born 1909)
- 16 April – Lawrence Ogilvie, plant pathologist (born 1898)
- 17 April
  - Sir Alexander Abel Smith, Army officer and banker (born 1904)
  - John Saxton, physicist (born 1914)
- 19 April – Tony Beckley, character actor (born 1927)
- 20 April – Sir Stephen Holmes, diplomat (born 1896)
- 22 April – Colin Maud, Royal Navy commodore (born 1903)
- 23 April
  - Sir John Methven, businessman (born 1926)
  - David Cleghorn Thomson, journalist, author and politician (born 1900)
- 26 April
  - Cicely Courtneidge, actress (born 1893)
  - Irene Ward, Baroness Ward of North Tyneside, politician (born 1895)
- 27 April
  - E. Martin Browne, theatre director (born 1900)
  - John Culshaw, British recording producer and musicologist (b. 1924)
- 29 April – Sir Alfred Hitchcock, film director (born 1899)
- 30 April – Thomas McMillan, politician (fall) (born 1919)

=== May ===
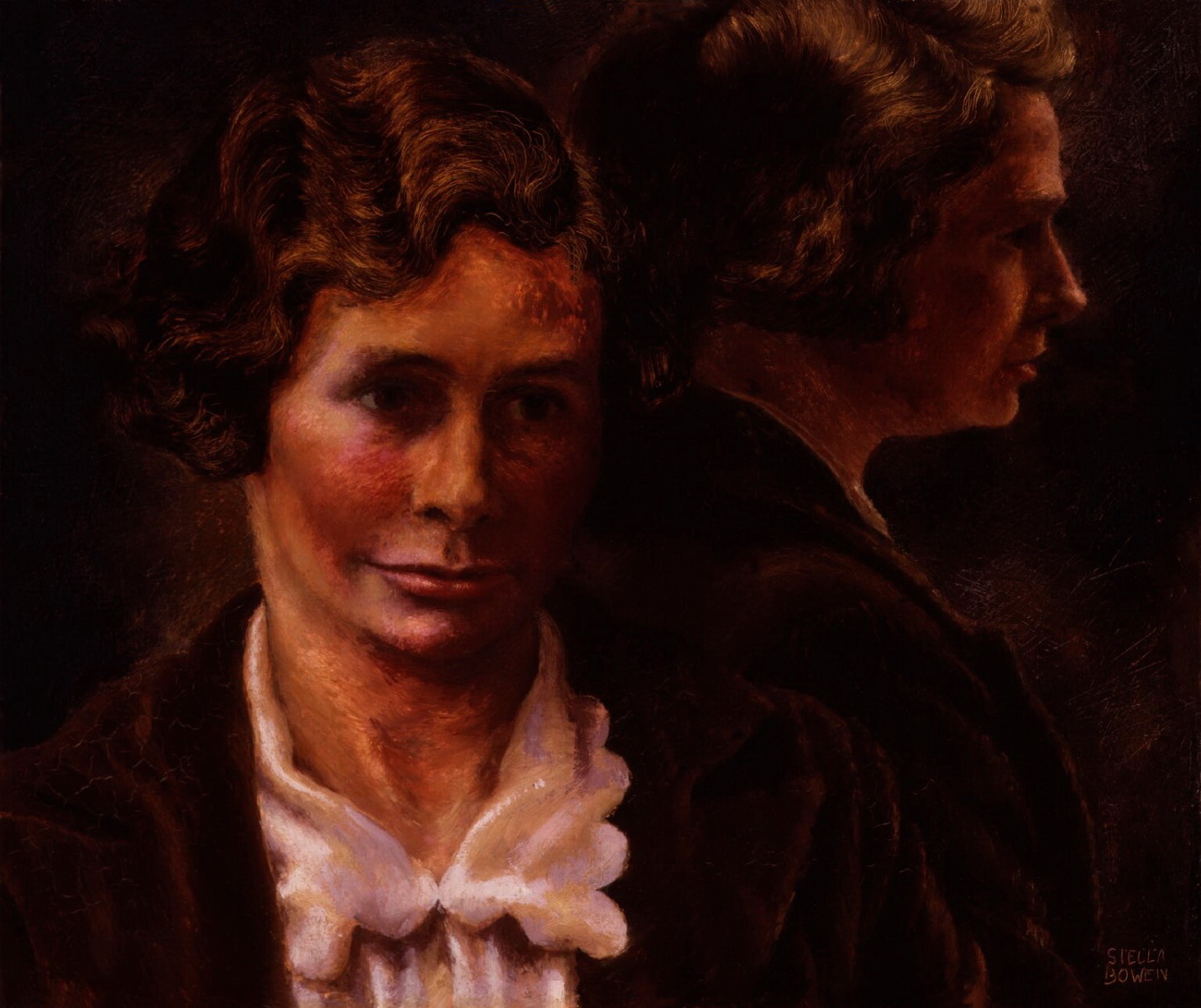
Margaret Cole

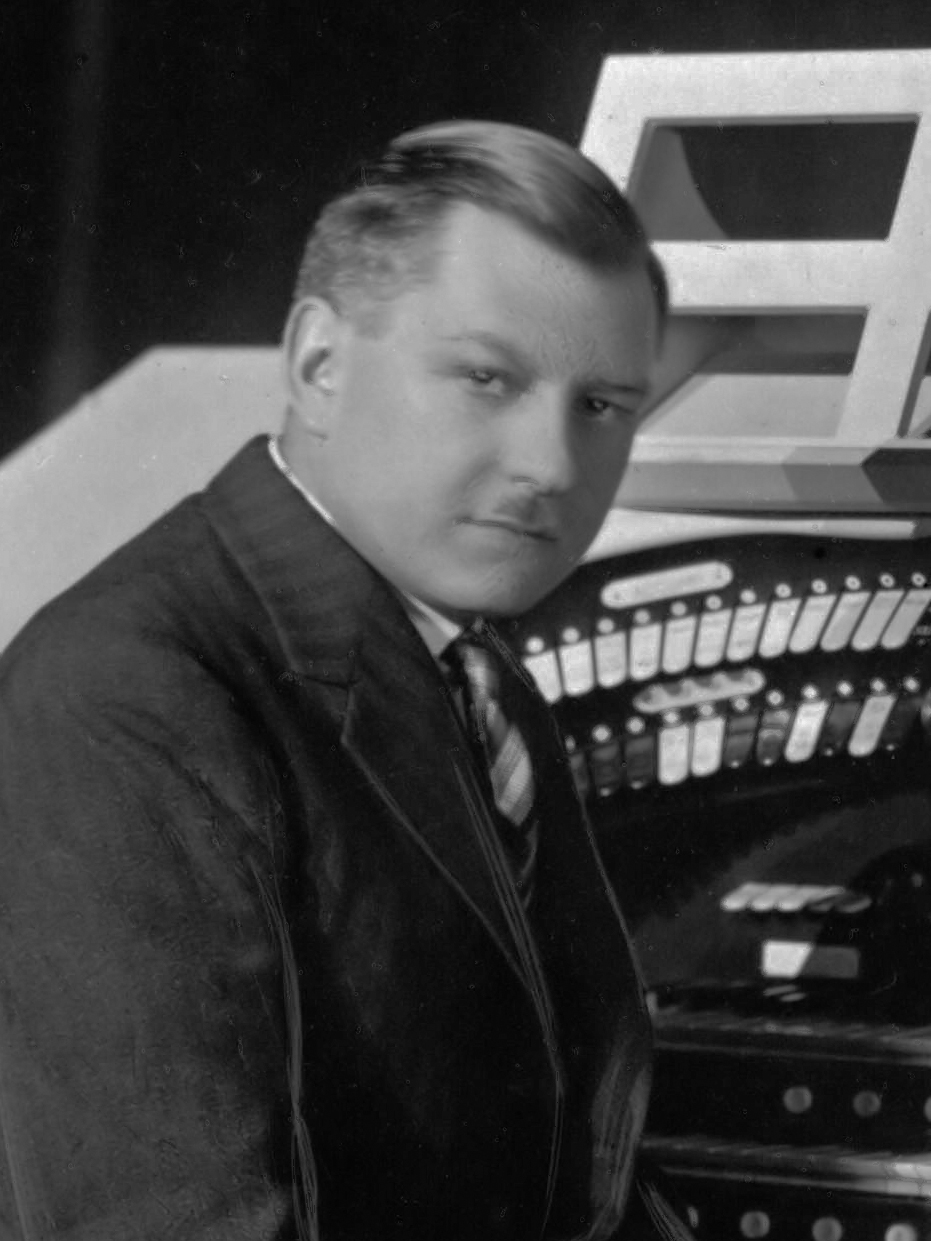
Reginald Foort

- 2 May
  - Sir Jocelyn Lucas, 4th Baronet, politician (born 1889)
  - Herbert Westmacott, Army captain (murdered by the Provisional IRA) (born 1952)
- 4 May
  - Kay Hammond, actress (born 1909)
  - Joe "Mr Piano" Henderson, jazz pianist (born 1920)
- 5 May
  - Sir Archibald James, RAF wing commander and politician (born 1893)
  - Betty May, singer, dancer and model (born 1894)
- 6 May
  - Arnold Sorsby, surgeon (born 1900 in the Russian Empire)
  - William Warbey, politician (born 1903)
- 7 May – Dame Margaret Cole, politician (born 1893)
- 8 May
  - Sir Geoffrey Baker, English field marshal (born 1912)
  - Charles Edward Hubbard, botanist (born 1900)
- 9 May – James Webb, historian (suicide) (born 1946)
- 10 May – Frank Lynch, trade unionist (born 1909)
- 12 May – William A. Robson, academic (born 1895)
- 14 May
  - Hugh Griffith, actor (born 1912)
  - Christine Longford, playwright (born 1900)
- 15 May – John Somers Dines, meteorologist (born 1885)
- 16 May
  - Alexander Gray, RAF air vice-marshal (born 1896)
  - Robert Allan Smith, physicist (born 1909)
- 17 May – C. C. Roberts, entrepreneur (born 1900)
- 18 May
  - Ian Curtis, post-punk musician and singer (Joy Division) (born 1956)
  - Bert Papworth, trade unionist (born 1899)
- 19 May
  - Janet Hitchman, author (born 1916)
  - Sir Christopher Peto, 3rd Baronet, Army brigadier and politician (born 1897)
- 20 May – Sir Oscar Morland, diplomat (born 1904)
- 22 May – Reginald Foort, theatre organist (born 1893)
- 24 May – Ronald Burroughs, diplomat (born 1917)
- 25 May
  - Alan Chadwick, gardener (born 1909)
  - George West, Anglican missionary (born 1893)
- 26 May – Sir Geoffrey Oliver, Royal Navy admiral (born 1898)
- 28 May
  - Albert Brough, English rugby league player and footballer (born 1895)
  - Jack Greenhalgh, trade union leader (born 1908)
  - Mirabel Topham, owner of Aintree Racecourse (born 1891)

=== June ===
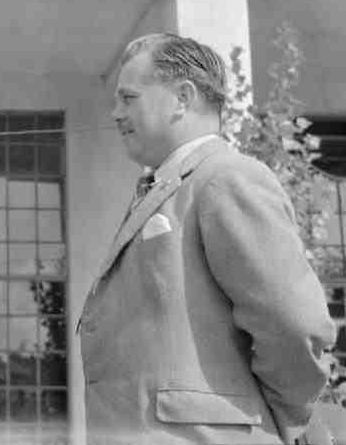
Billy Butlin

- 1 June
  - George Marsden, boxer (born 1911)
  - Len Wickwar, boxer (born 1911)
- 5 June – William Seagrove, athlete (born 1898)
- 6 June
  - Humphrey de Verd Leigh, RAF wing commander after whom the Leigh Light is named (born 1897)
  - William Francis Kynaston Thompson, Army brigadier and journalist (born 1909)
- 7 June – Elizabeth Craig, writer (born 1883)
- 9 June – Sir Derrick Dunlop, physician and pharmacologist (born 1902)
- 10 June – Denis Hanley, electrical engineer and politician (born 1903)
- 12 June
  - Sir Billy Butlin, founder of Butlins holiday camps (born 1899 in South Africa)
  - Kathleen Hewitt, author and playwright (born 1893 in India)
  - Egon Pearson, statistician (born 1895)
- 14 June
  - Francis MacCarthy Willis Bund, Anglican clergyman (born 1905)
  - Sir Reginald Savory, Army lieutenant-general (born 1894)
- 18 June
  - Sir Maurice Bridgeman, oil executive (born 1904)
  - Terence Fisher, film director (born 1904)
  - Neville George, geologist (born 1904)
- 19 June – Gladys Wright, educator (born 1891)
- 20 June
  - John Beck, golfer (born 1899)
  - Amy Clarke, mystical poet, writer and teacher (born 1892)
- 21 June – W. A. H. Rushton, physiologist (born 1901)
- 22 June – Joseph Cohen, solicitor (born 1889)
- 23 June – John Laurie, Scottish actor (born 1897)
- 27 June – Sir Gordon Sutherland, Scottish physicist (born 1907)

=== July ===
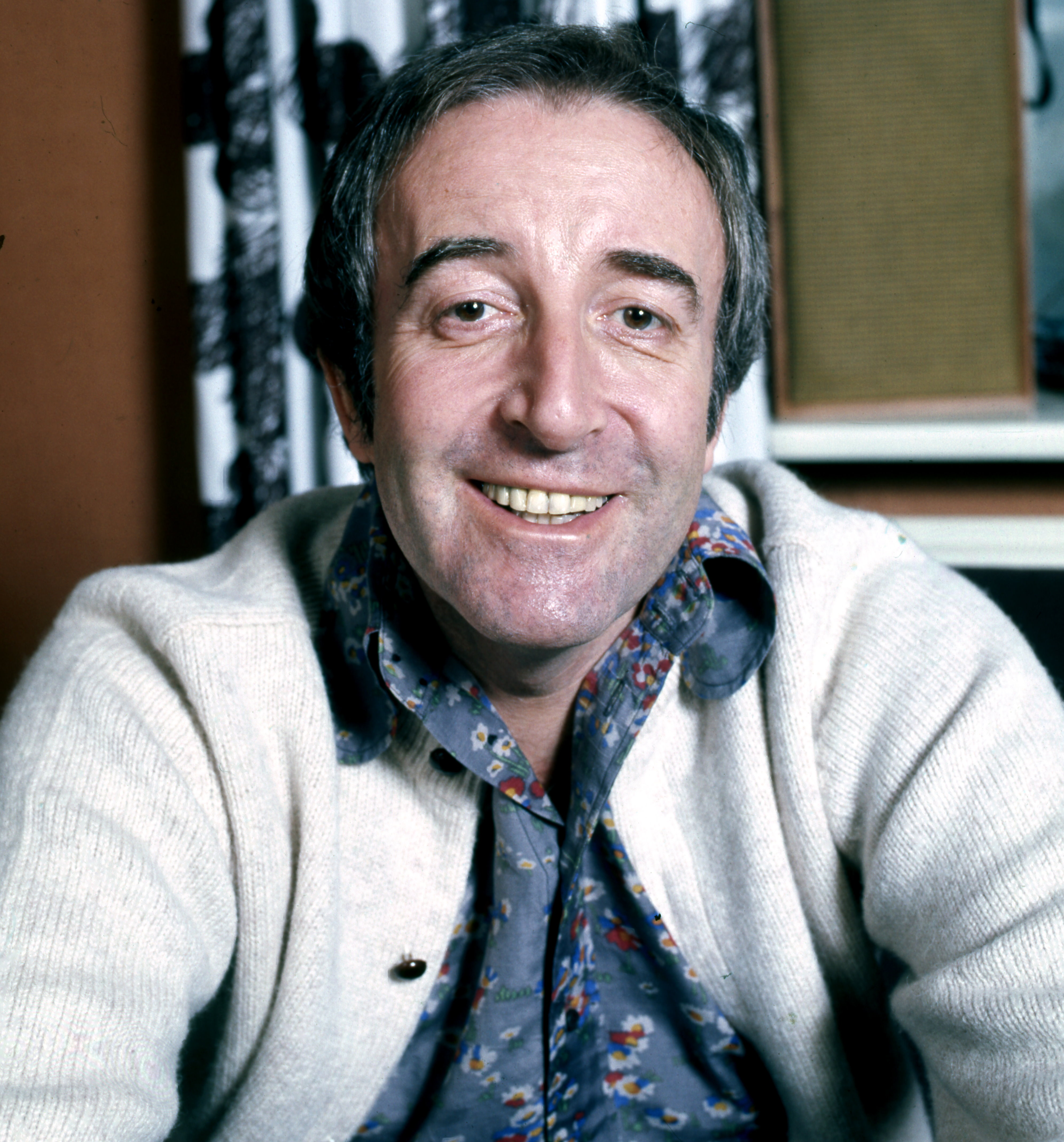
Peter Sellers

- 1 July – C. P. Snow, novelist and physicist (born 1905)
- 2 July
  - Sir Alan Hitchman, civil servant (born 1903)
  - Michael Isaacs, 3rd Marquess of Reading, peer and banker (born 1916)
- 3 July – Charles Benstead, English cricketer and author (born 1896)
- 4 July – Gregory Bateson, anthropologist, anthropologist, social scientist, linguist, semiotician and cyberneticist (b. 1904)
- 6 July
  - Frank Cordell, composer and conductor (born 1918)
  - Jeanie Dicks, engineer (born 1893)
  - Mary Hignett, actress and wife of Michael Brennan (born 1916)
  - Sir Ralph Windham, lawyer (born 1905)
- 7 July – Reginald Gardiner, actor (born 1903)
- 9 July – Peter Strausfeld, painter (born 1910 in the German Empire)
- 12 July – William Armstrong, Baron Armstrong of Sanderstead, civil servant and banker (born 1915)
- 14 July – Aneirin Talfan Davies, Welsh poet and broadcaster (born 1909)
- 15 July – Dorothy Johnstone, Scottish painter (born 1892)
- 18 July – Robert Kidd, theatre director (born 1943)
- 20 July – John Grimshaw, World War I soldier and Victoria Cross recipient (born 1893)
- 21 July – Isabella Leitch, physiologist and suffragette (born 1890)
- 23 July
  - Sir George Johnson, Army major-general (born 1903)
  - Olivia Manning, novelist and poet (born 1908)
- 24 July – Peter Sellers, comic actor (born 1925)
- 26 July – Kenneth Tynan, theatre critic (born 1927)
- 28 July – Sir Cullum Welch, businessman (born 1895)
- 29 July – Eileen Skellern, nurse (born 1923)

=== August ===
- 4 August
  - Dorice Fordred, actress (born 1902)
  - H. P. Ruffell Smith, RAF group captain (born 1911)
- 5 August – Norman Fulton, composer (born 1909)
- 6 August – Leslie Hilton Brown, agriculturalist and ornithologist (born 1917)
- 7 August
  - Lady Clare Annesley, socialist activist (born 1893)
  - Henry Everard, railway engineer (born 1897)
  - Kathleen Fidler, children's author (born 1899)
- 9 August – Audrey Jeans, singer and comedienne (car accident) (born 1929)
- 10 August – Gareth Evans, philosopher (born 1946)
- 12 August – Leopold Spinner, composer (born 1906 in Austria-Hungary)
- 14 August
  - Ronald Brooks, English cricketer and Army officer (born 1899)
  - Cyril Gordon Martin, Army brigadier and Victoria Cross recipient (born 1891)
- 18 August – Harold Kitching, rower (born 1885)
- 20 August
  - A. K. Hamilton Jenkin, historian and author (born 1900)
  - Dame Lucy Sutherland, historian, academic (born 1903 in Australia)
- 21 August
  - Jennifer Nicks, pair skater (born 1932)
  - Norman Shelley, actor (born 1903)
- 24 August
  - Yootha Joyce, actress (born 1927)
  - Gerard Shelley, linguist and translator (born 1891)
- 26 August
  - Lucy Morton, Olympic swimmer (born 1898)
  - George William Symes, Army major-general (born 1896)
- 27 August – Arabella Scott, suffragette and women's rights campaigner (born 1886)
- 28 August – Roy Pascal, academic (born 1904)
- 31 August – Anne Tibble, writer (born 1906)

=== September ===
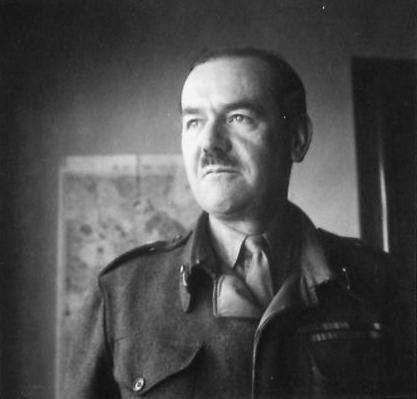
Alexander Hood

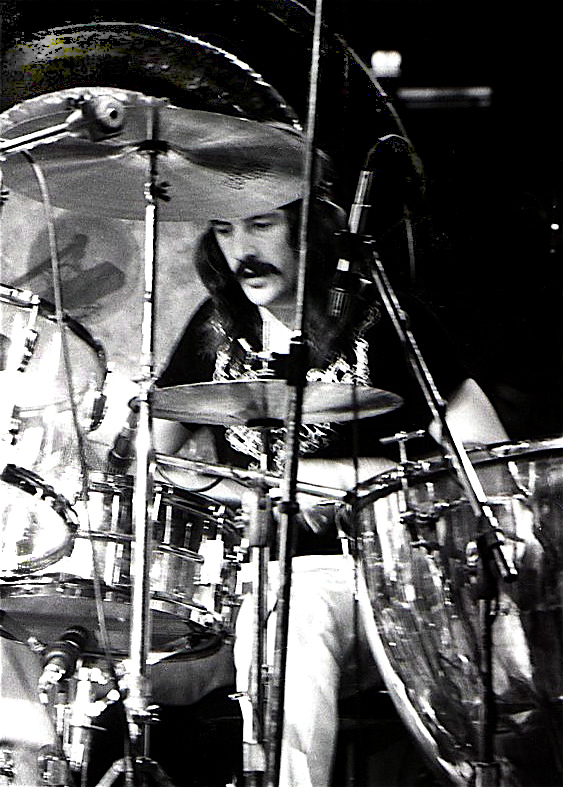
John Bonham

- 1 September – Arthur Greville Collins, film director (born 1896)
- 2 September – George Reginald Starr, mining engineer and World War II spy (born 1904)
- 3 September
  - Russell Brock, Baron Brock, surgeon (born 1903)
  - Sir George Pickering, physician (born 1904)
- 5 September – Adrian Bell, farmer, writer and crossword compiler (born 1901)
- 6 September
  - Philip Hendy, art curator (born 1900)
  - Christopher Maltby, Army major-general (born 1891)
- 7 September – Reginald Manningham-Buller, 1st Viscount Dilhorne, lawyer and politician (born 1905)
- 8 September
  - Eddie Butcher, Northern Irish singer (born 1900)
  - John Christie, teacher (born 1899)
  - Sir Geoffrey Shakespeare, 1st Baronet, politician (born 1893)
- 10 September – T. E. Jessop, academic (born 1896)
- 11 September
  - Sir Harwood Harrison, 1st Baronet, politician (born 1907)
  - Sir Alexander Hood, Army lieutenant-general, physician and Governor of Bermuda (1949–1955) (born 1888)
- 12 September – Sir Rupert Cross, legal scholar (born 1912)
- 14 September – Alison Settle, fashion journalist (born 1891)
- 17 September – Enid Warren, social worker (born 1903)
- 18 September
  - Edward Croft-Murray, antiquarian (born 1907)
  - Walter Midgley, opera singer (born 1912)
- 22 September
  - Raymond Dobson, politician and airline executive (born 1925)
  - J. R. James, town planner (born 1912)
- 23 September
  - Geoffrey Latham, English cricketer and colonial administrator (born 1887)
  - Alan S. C. Ross, linguist (born 1907)
- 24 September
  - Jacky Gillott, novelist and television broadcaster (suicide) (born 1939)
  - Clarence James Hickman, mycologist (born 1914)
  - H. E. Watson, chemist (born 1886)
- 25 September – John Bonham, drummer (Led Zeppelin) (born 1948)
- 27 September – Sir Michael Turner, banker (born 1905)
- 28 September – Horace Finch, pianist and organist (born 1906)
- 29 September
  - Sir Juxon Barton, colonial administrator (born 1891)
  - Sir Alan Burns, colonial administrator (born 1887)
  - Peter Mahon, politician (born 1909)
- 30 September
  - James Wyllie Gregor, botanist (born 1900)
  - George Waterston, stationer, ornithologist and conservationist (born 1911)

=== October ===
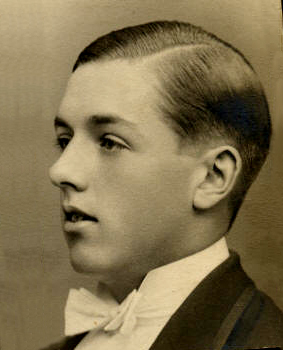
Nicholas Llewelyn Davies

- 1 October – Derek Mills-Roberts, Army brigadier (born 1908)
- 3 October – Sir Conrad Corfield, civil servant (born 1893)
- 5 October – Sir Geoffrey Hawkins, Royal Navy admiral (born 1895)
- 6 October
  - Hattie Jacques, comic actress (heart attack) (born 1922)
  - Robert Don Oliver, Royal Navy vice-admiral (born 1895)
- 7 October – Sir Gordon Russell, designer and craftsman (born 1892)
- 9 October – Adam Henry Robson, RAF air vice-marshal (born 1892)
- 10 October
  - Evelyn Emmet, Baroness Emmet of Amberley, politician (born 1899)
  - Wilfred Hill-Wood, English cricketer and financier (born 1901)
- 11 October – Cassie Walmer, singer, dancer and comedian (born 1888)
- 12 October – Ambrosine Phillpotts, actress (born 1912)
- 14 October
  - Nicholas Llewelyn Davies, youngest of the Llewelyn Davies boys (born 1903)
  - Arthur Pearson, politician (born 1897)
- 15 October – Katharine Mary Briggs, folklorist and writer (born 1898)
- 19 October – D. G. Bridson, radio producer (born 1910)
- 20 October
  - Isobel, Lady Barnett, television and radio personality (born 1918)
  - Phoebe Holcroft Watson, tennis player (born 1898)
- 24 October – Sir Richard Glyn, 9th Baronet, Army officer and politician (born 1907)
- 26 October – Sam Cree, Northern Irish playwright (born 1928)
- 27 October
  - Harold Phillips, Army lieutenant-colonel (born 1909)
  - Steve Peregrin Took, singer-songwriter (T. Rex) (born 1949)
- 29 October – Ouida MacDermott, actress and singer (born 1889)
- 30 October – Guy Bellis, film actor (born 1886)

=== November ===
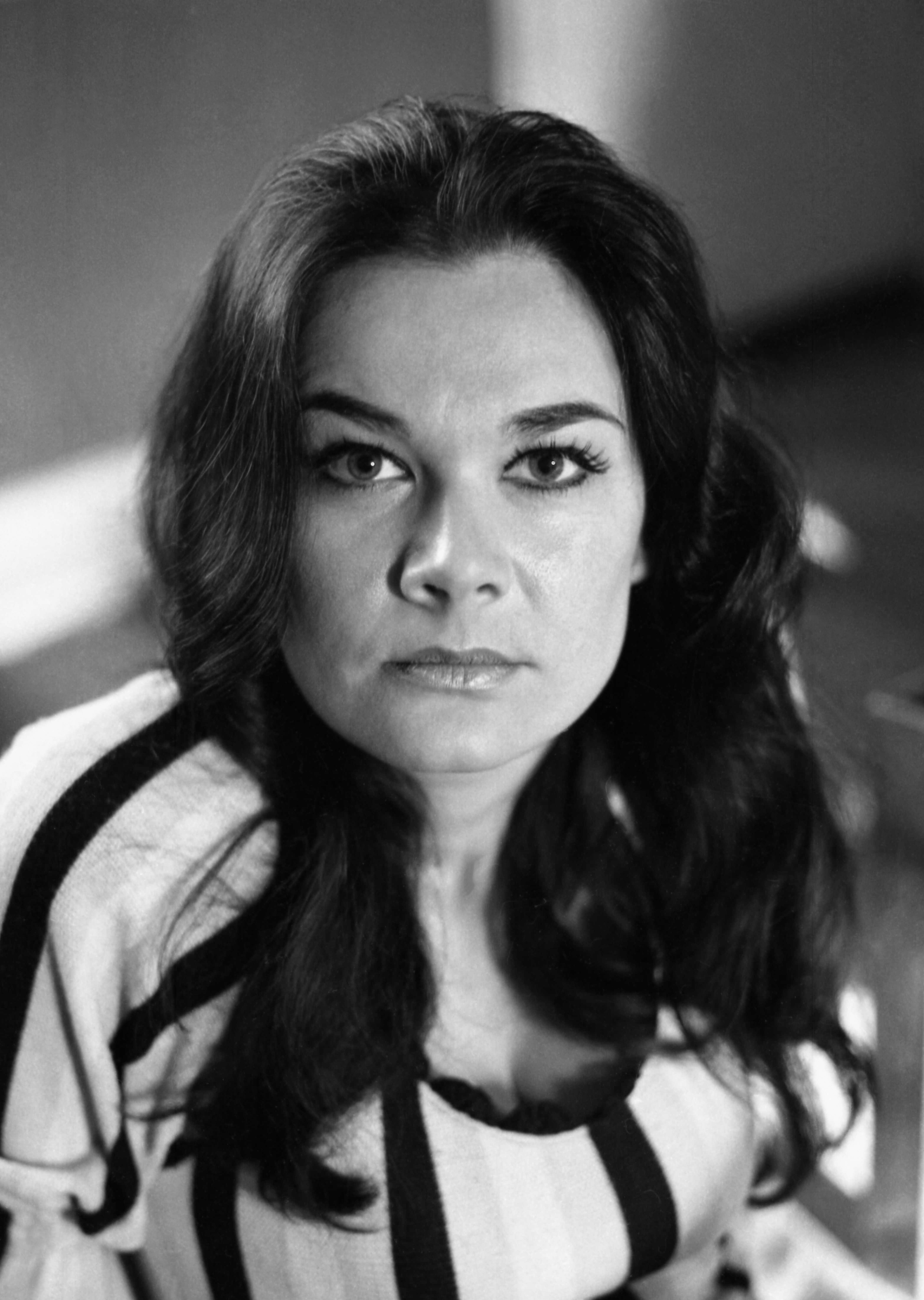
Imogen Hassall

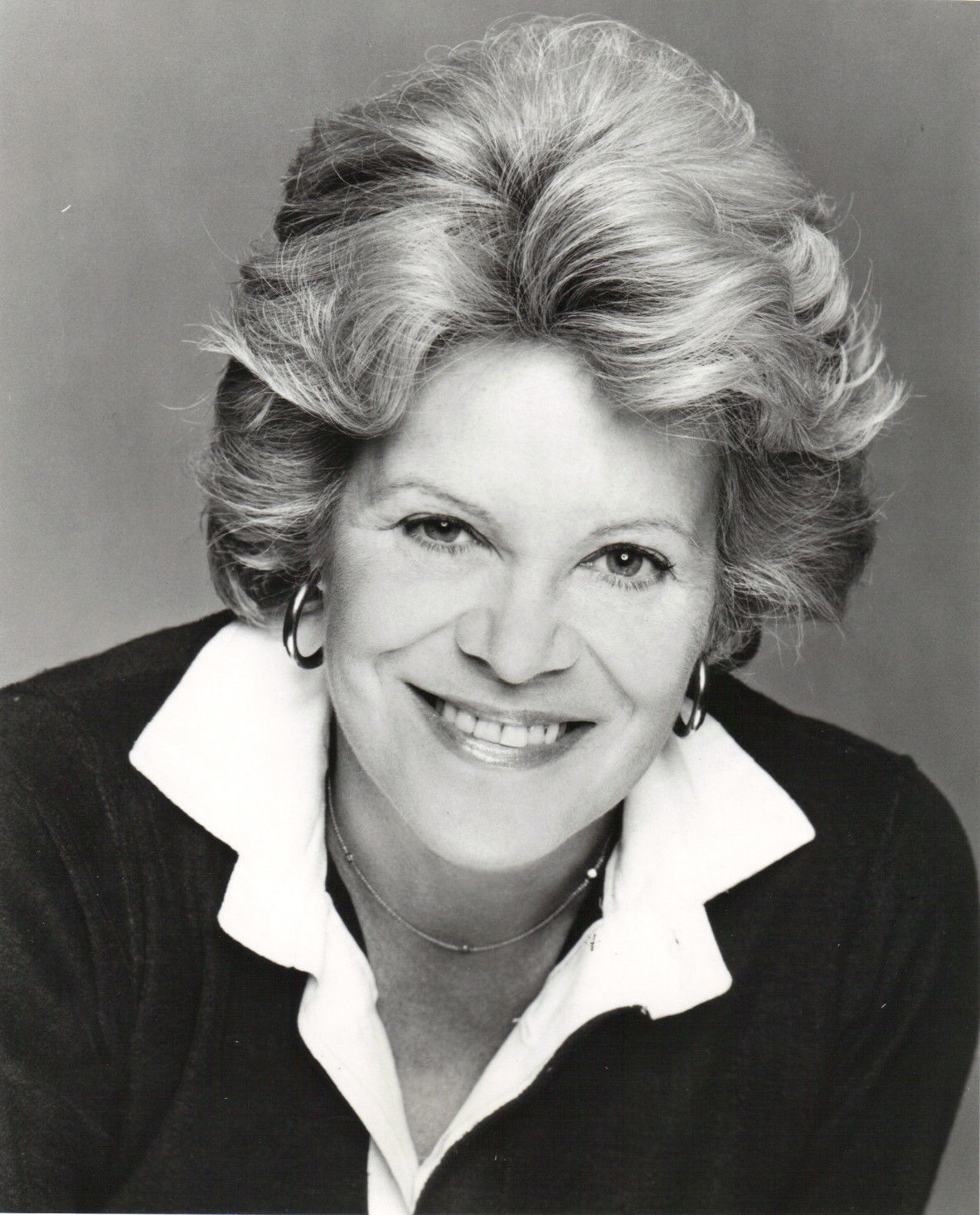
Rachel Roberts

- 1 November – Edward Wilfred Taylor, optical instrument manufacturer (born 1891)
- 3 November
  - Dennis Burgess, actor (heart attack) (born 1926)
  - David Lowe, horticulturalist (born 1899)
- 4 November
  - Sir Kenneth Blackburne, colonial administrator, first governor-general of Jamaica (born 1907)
  - Paul Kaye, radio broadcaster (born 1934)
  - Johnny Owen, boxer (born 1956)
- 5 November – Sydney Pope, RAF air commodore (born 1898)
- 6 November – Nevill Coghill, literary scholar (born 1899)
- 7 November – Norman Marshall, theatre director (born 1901)
- 8 November
  - Gordon Robert Archibald, Scottish painter (born 1905)
  - Valerie Myerscough, mathematician and astrophysicist (born 1942)
  - Julian Wintle, film and television producer (born 1913)
- 9 November – Pearl Jephcott, social researcher (born 1900)
- 10 November
  - Patrick Campbell, 3rd Baron Glenavy, peer, journalist and television personality (born 1913)
  - James Priddey, painter, printmaker and illustrator (born 1916)
  - Sir Samuel Isidore Salmon, politician and philanthropist (born 1900)
- 11 November – Connie Lewcock, suffragette and socialist (born 1894)
- 12 November – John Chetwynd-Talbot, 21st Earl of Shrewsbury, peer (born 1914)
- 14 November – Arnold Haskell, dance critic (born 1903)
- 15 November
  - Joan Fleming, crime novelist (born 1908)
  - Richard Law, 1st Baron Coleraine, politician (born 1901)
  - Agnes Miller Parker, Scottish engraver and painter (born 1895)
- 16 November – Imogen Hassall, actress (suicide) (born 1946)
- 17 November – David Marr, neuroscientist (born 1945)
- 18 November – Richard Carline, artist and writer (born 1896)
- 19 November
  - E. J. Bowen, chemist (born 1898)
  - Laurie Cumming, Northern Irish footballer (born 1905)
- 22 November – Norah McGuinness, painter and illustrator (born 1901)
- 23 November – R. Allatini, novelist (born 1890, Austria-Hungary)
- 25 November
  - Dorothy Elliott, trade unionist (born 1896)
  - Mary Winearls Porter, crystallographer and geologist (born 1886)
  - Sir Alan Scott-Moncrieff, Royal Navy admiral (born 1900)
- 26 November
  - Rachel Roberts, actress (suicide) (born 1927)
  - Hector Ross, actor (born 1914)
- 27 November – John Hubbard, physicist after whom the Hubbard model is named (born 1931)
- 28 November
  - Bernard Fergusson, Baron Ballantrae, Army brigadier-general, historian and governor-general of New Zealand (1962–1967) (born 1911)
  - Antony Lyttelton, 2nd Viscount Chandos, peer (born 1920)
  - Tom Stobart, cameraman and film maker who shot The Conquest of Everest (born 1914)
- 29 November – Joel Hurstfield, historian (born 1911)

=== December ===
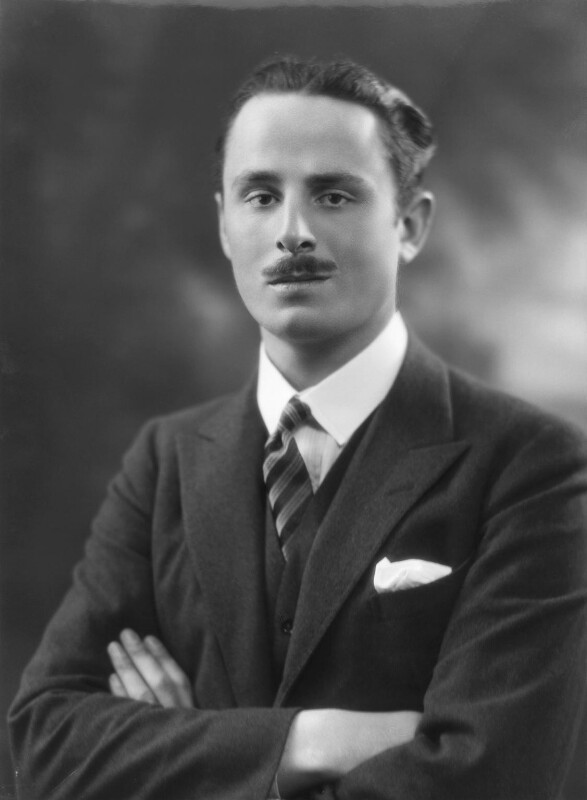
Oswald Mosley

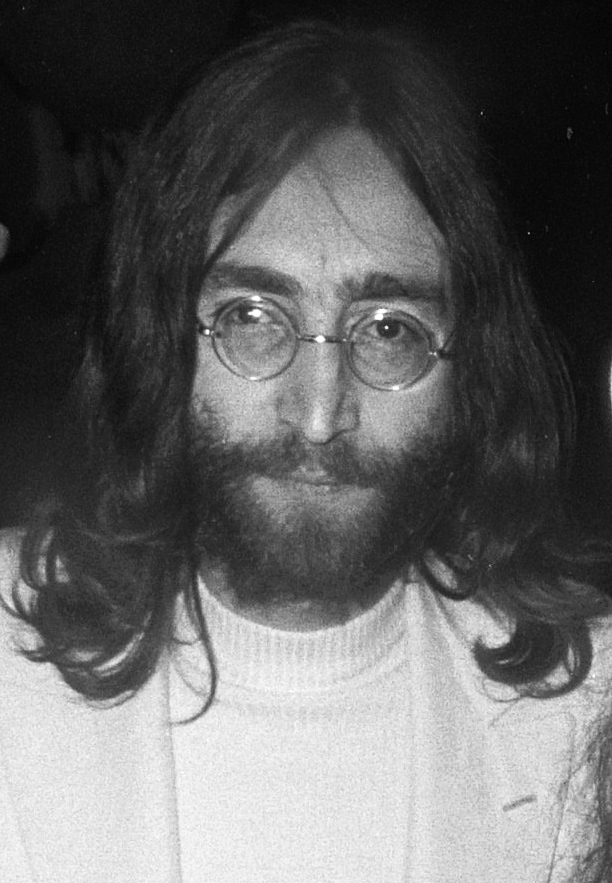
John Lennon

- 2 December – Patrick Gordon Walker, politician (born 1907)
- 3 December
  - Oswald Mosley, leader of the British Union of Fascists (born 1896)
  - Beatrice Ormsby-Gore, Baroness Harlech, courtier to the Queen Mother (born 1891)
- 4 December – Geoffrey Cooke, English cricketer (born 1897)
- 6 December
  - Margot Bennett, novelist (born 1912)
  - Sir Reginald Graham, Army lieutenant-colonel and Victoria Cross recipient (born 1892)
  - Sir Roderick McLeod, Army lieutenant-general (born 1905)
- 7 December – Gerard Bucknall, Army lieutenant-general (born 1894)
- 8 December
  - John Lennon, pop singer-songwriter and guitarist (The Beatles) (murdered in the United States) (born 1940)
  - Charles Parker, radio documentary producer (born 1919)
  - William Ritchie Russell, neurologist (born 1903)
- 10 December – Philip MacDonald, crime writer (born 1900)
- 11 December
  - Margaret Malcolm, novelist (born 1900)
  - Sonia Orwell, second wife of George Orwell (born 1918)
- 12 December – Sir Jules Thorn, businessman, founder of Thorn Electrical Industries (born 1899)
- 13 December
  - Ferdinand Cavendish-Bentinck, 8th Duke of Portland, peer (born 1889)
  - R. D. Low, comics writer and editor (born 1895)
  - John Morris, anthropologist and journalist (born 1895)
  - Harry Pursey, politician (born 1891)
  - Norman Roberts, World War I air ace (born 1896)
- 14 December
  - Sir Weldon Dalrymple-Champneys, 2nd Baronet, physician and civil servant (born 1892)
  - John Erskine, 1st Baron Erskine of Rerrick, banker and Governor of Northern Ireland (1964–1968) (born 1893)
  - Forbes Jones, Scottish cricketer (born 1911)
- 16 December
  - Keith Christie, jazz trombonist (born 1931)
  - Peter Collinson, film director (The Italian Job) (born 1936)
- 17 December – Elsie Few, artist (born 1909 in Jamaica)
- 18 December – Ben Travers, playwright (born 1886)
- 20 December
  - Roland Bond, locomotive engineer (born 1903)
  - Tom Waring, English footballer (born 1906)
- 22 December
  - Lewis Ganson, magician (born 1913)
  - Thomas Cecil Hunt, physician and gastroenterologist (born 1901)
- 23 December
  - Frank Norman, novelist and playwright (born 1930)
  - Ambrose Reeves, Anglican bishop and anti-apartheid campaigner (born 1899)
- 25 December
  - Fred Emney, actor and comedian (born 1900)
  - Quintin Riley, Arctic explorer (born 1905)
- 27 December
  - Eric Green, golfer (born 1908)
  - Arthur Havers, golfer (born 1898)
  - Michael Hughes-Young, 1st Baron St Helens, peer and politician (born 1912)
- 29 December
  - Lennie Felix, jazz pianist (car accident) (born 1920)
  - John Wall, Baron Wall, businessman (born 1913)
- 31 December – Maurice Cornforth, Marxist philosopher (born 1909)

== See also ==
- 1980 in British music
- 1980 in British television
- List of British films of 1980
