= Llewellyn Petley-Jones =

Anglo-Canadian Painter

- Born: Llewellyn Petley-Jones; 23 August 1908; Edmonton, Canada
- Died: 11 May 1986 (aged 77); Roehampton, London
- Education: Strathcona Collegiate Institute
- Style: Impressionism; Fauvism; Cubism
- Spouse: Nancy Corbet (m. 1940)
- Children: 7

Llewellyn Petley-Jones (23 August 1908 – 11 May 1986) was an Anglo-Canadian painter born in Edmonton, Alberta, Canada.

== Early life and education ==
Petley-Jones, the son of Arthur Hurdis Jones and Elizabeth Petley, was one of six brothers born into an artistic middle-class family residing at the corner of 104th Street and Saskatchewan Avenue (now called 97th Avenue) in Edmonton, Canada. One of Petley-Jones's great-grandfathers was Sir William Myers, commander in chief of the forces in British North America. Another was Admiral Sir Charles Jones, a founding member of the Royal Society of Canada. He was educated at Strathcona Collegiate Institute, where he developed a passion for painting and art. Despite lacking any formal training, after working for three years as a bank clerk at the Bank of Nova Scotia, he abandoned banking to turn to painting and teaching in his own Edmonton studio.

== Career and later life ==
Though frequently labelled as a Canadian impressionist, Petley-Jones's works encompass a wide array of styles. These include not only impressionism but also abstract art, works influenced by the Scottish Colourists, and the fauvist and cubist movements he studied while in France. His works encompass watercolour, oils, line drawing as well as prints.

Petley-Jones became a member of the Edmonton Art Club in 1927, and in 1931 he was one of the early generation of artists who joined the Alberta Society of Artists. The same year, at the age of 23, his paintings were accepted by jury for the National Gallery of Canada annual show.

In 1934, he moved to London and established his own studio. In 1935, one of his watercolours depicting Seba Beach in Alberta was selected by the Royal Academy, hung at eye level, for their annual exhibition in London. That same year, he was also accepted to exhibit by the Royal Society of British Artists. Soon after, he moved to France and established a studio in the Montparnasse area of Paris. His works were exhibited with the Salon de la Société Nationale des Beaux Arts and the Salon d'Automne. While in Paris, he became acquainted with Matisse, Picasso, Cyril Mann and Ivan Rein. In 1939 an exhibition of many of his works was held on Bond Street opened by the former Canadian Prime Minister RB Bennett. In 1939, he met his wife, Nancy Corbet a fellow Canadian and artist, who was working as head of the BBC's scripts department in London. After getting married at (All Saints' Church, Putney), they spent their honeymoon in Florence, Italy, from where they had to hastily leave in 1940 as the war intensified. Returning to the UK, Petley-Jones joined the Royal Navy for the duration of the Second World War.

After the war, he settled in Richmond, London with the exception of a brief stint between 1950 and 1954 when he lived in Horseshoe Bay, Vancouver. On his return to Europe, he undertook a series of paintings of Paris commissioned by Max Stern, founder of the Dominion Gallery, Montreal.

In 1955 Petley-Jones was commissioned by the Alberta Government to paint portraits of Queen Elizabeth II and her husband for the Alberta Legislature Building which now sit in the Government House collections. Other notable commissions include, alongside a number of artists from the Group of Seven, a commission by the Canadian Pacific Railway for the design and painting of artwork including 14 foot murals for the Canadian Pacific Railway, which decorated the railway's double decker trains.

In 1958 Petley-Jones held an exhibition of abstract art at the Waddington Galleries. Other solo exhibitions included St George's Gallery (1941,1945), Gimpel Fils (1949), University of London (1950),Wildenstein (London) (1946–8, 1954), Imperial Institute (1956), Dominion Gallery (Montreal) (1957), and Waddington Galleries (1958). Group shows include exhibitions at the Royal Academy (1935–43), Royal Portrait Society, Royal Society of British Artists, New English Art Club, Royal Scottish Academy, Royal Hibernian Academy, Ireland, and the Royal Institute of Oil Painters. He was a member of the Royal Watercolour Society, and the Canadian Group of Painters. In 1989, Richmond Antiquary Gallery held a retrospective of his work.

== Museum and gallery holdings ==
- Alberta Foundation for the Arts (Canada).
- Amgueddfa Cymru – National Museum Wales (UK)
- Art Gallery of Alberta (Canada)
- Art Gallery of Ontario (Canada)
- Burgh House (UK)
- Canada Science and Technology Museum (Canada)
- Government House (Alberta) (Canada)
- University of Alberta Museums (Canada)
