= Doug Lowe =

Doug or Douglas Lowe may refer to:

- Douglas Lowe (athlete) (1902–1981), British twice Olympic champion sprinter
- Douglas Lowe (RAF officer) (1922–2018), World War II pilot and Royal Air Force air chief marshal
- Douglas Lowe (rugby union)
- Doug Lowe (Australian politician) (born 1942), former Tasmanian premier
