= Robert Jephson Jones =

George Cross recipient (1905–1985)

- Captain Jephson Jones (left) and Lieutenant Bill Eastman after being decorated at Buckingham Palace.
- Born: 7 April 1905; Oddington, Oxfordshire
- Died: 27 October 1985 (aged 80); Ferndown, Dorset
- Military career
- Allegiance: United Kingdom
- Branch: British Army
- Service years: 1925–1960
- Rank: Brigadier
- Service number: 31996
- Unit: Royal Army Ordnance Corps
- Conflicts: Second World War
- Awards: George Cross

Brigadier Robert Llewellyn Jephson Jones, GC (7 April 1905 – 27 October 1985) was a British Army officer and a recipient of the George Cross. Along with Lieutenant Bill Eastman, he was awarded the George Cross for incredible courage in dealing with some 275 unexploded bombs on the island of Malta during the Second World War.

== Early life and career ==
The son of a clergyman, he was born on 7 April 1905 and began his officer training at Sandhurst in 1923. He was commissioned into the Duke of Wellington's Regiment in 1925, served as Adjutant of the 6th Nigeria Regiment in 1932–34 and joined the RAOC in 1936.

== George Cross citation ==
Notice of Jephson Jones and Eastman's awards appeared in The London Gazette on Christmas Eve 1940:

Colonel RL Jephson-Jones, RAOC and Major WM Eastman, RAOC, are awarded the George Cross for a joint achievement (bomb disposal) in Malta during the enemy's concentrated air attacks on the fortress in June to November 1940. On various dates, Captain Jephson-Jones and Lieutenant Eastman, worked under dangerous and trying conditions and performed acts of considerable gallantry in dealing with a large number of variously unexploded bombs, some of which were in a very highly dangerous state and of the German delayed action type.

== Post-war ==
Jephson Jones died in Ferndown, Dorset, on 27 October 1985.
