= Douglas Lowe (rugby union) =

- Full name: James Douglas Lowe
- Born: 28 May 1906
- Died: 7 November 1936 (aged 30) Edinburgh, Scotland

Rugby union career
- Position: Forward
International career
Years	Team	Apps	(Points)
1934	Scotland	1	(0)

James Douglas Lowe (28 May 1906 — 7 November 1936) was a Scottish international rugby union player.

Lowe was the son of David Lowe, Provost of Musselburgh, and a brother of horticulturalist David Lowe.

A forward, Lowe played for Edinburgh club Heriot's FP. He gained his solitary Scotland cap against Wales at Murrayfield in the 1934 Home Nations and represented Cities (Edinburgh & Glasgow) against the touring 1935–36 All Blacks.

Lowe died of illness in 1936 at the age of 30. He had noticed a pain in his arm a week prior following a club game with Heriot's, then several days later was taken ill and diagnosed with blood poisoning.

== See also ==
- List of Scotland national rugby union players
