= Forbes Jones =

Scottish cricketer

Personal information
- Full name: James Forbes Jones
- Born: 9 January 1911; Larbert, Stirlingshire, Scotland
- Died: 14 December 1980 (aged 69); Kilchrenen-by-Taynuilt, Argyll, Scotland
- Batting: Right-handed
- Bowling: Right-arm medium
- Relatives: James Bruce-Jones (cousin)

Domestic team information
- Years: Team
- 1930–1939: Scotland

Career statistics
Competition	First-class
Matches	10
Runs scored	404
Batting average	23.76
100s/50s	–/4
Top score	91
Balls bowled	78
Wickets	1
Bowling average	38.00
5 wickets in innings	–
10 wickets in match	–
Best bowling	1/38
Catches/stumpings	11/–
- Source: Cricinfo, 24 July 2022

James Forbes Jones MC DL (9 January 1911 – 14 December 1980) was a Scottish first-class cricketer and British Army officer.

The son of Peter Forbes Jones, he was born at Larbert in January 1911. Forbes was educated at Fettes College. A club cricketer for both Stirling County and Grange Cricket Club, he made his debut for Scotland in first-class cricket against the touring Australians at Edinburgh in 1930. He played first-class cricket for Scotland until 1939, making ten appearances; one half of these were against Ireland, while the other half were played against various touring teams. Playing in the Scottish side as a batsman, he scored 404 runs at an average of 23.76; he made four half centuries, with a highest score of 91 against Ireland at Dublin in his final first-class match in 1939. Outside of cricket, he was a noted lacrosse player.

In March 1939, Jones was given a one month driving ban at Dunfermline Sheriff Court for driving over 30 mph (48 km/h) on the Kincardine Bridge. Jones served in the British Army during the Second World War, being commissioned as a second lieutenant in the Royal Artillery shortly before the outbreak of the war. During the war, the family foundry business, Jones & Campbell, came under pressure and his father made numerous requests to have Forbes released from military service, but these were denied. In August 1942, he was awarded the Military Cross in recognition of gallant and distinguished services during the Siege of Malta. At this stage of the war he was a lieutenant with the temporary rank of captain. Following the sudden death of his father in June 1944, Forbes was permitted to return home to take over the running of the family foundry, which upon his return he found to be unproductive, worn out, and old-fashioned. Following the war, he was offered the captaincy of the Scotland cricket team, but declined the offer to focus all of his attention on reforming the running of the foundry.

He continued in the British Army after the war in the Territorial Army, an association he retained until April 1961, when he exceeded the age limit for belonging to the Reserve of Officers. He was appointed a deputy lieutenant for Stirlingshire in September 1963. Jones died in December 1980 at Kilchrenen-by-Taynuilt, Argyll. His cousin, James Bruce-Jones, was also a first-class cricketer.
