= Ronald Dare Gillespie =

Scottish Canadian businessman, British Army officer and politician in Hong Kong

- Born: 14 April 1890; Victoria, British Columbia, Canada
- Died: 8 April 1981 (aged 90); Milford-on-Sea, Hampshire, England
- Occupation: British Army officer

Ronald Dare Gillespie (14 April 1890 – 8 April 1981) was a Scottish Canadian businessman, British Army officer and politician in Hong Kong. He was member of the Legislative Council of Hong Kong from 1946 to 1948.

== Biography ==
Ronald Dare Gillespie was born in Victoria, British Columbia, Canada in April 1890 and was educated at Loretto School, Edinburgh He received his training in Edinburgh but returned to British Columbia to practise engineering and surveying. He served as Captain in the Gordon Highlanders during the First World War and was taken prisoner of war at La Bassee in January 1915 and was later exchanged.

After the war, he joined the Imperial Chemical Industries, a British chemicals company which he later became the Chairman, and served in several cities in China. He was interned in Hong Kong by the Japanese during the Japanese occupation of Hong Kong and was released in exchange for Japanese held by Canada in 1943. Gillespie then served in the British Raw Materials Mission in Washington until the war ended.

Gillespie returned to Hong Kong in October 1945 and became the Chairman of the Hong Kong General Chamber of Commerce. In April 1946, he was nominated as the Chamber of Commerce's representative in the Legislative Council of Hong Kong and served until 1948.

During his service in the Legislative Council, he was appointed member of the eleven-member Taxation Committee in 1946 which chaired by the Financial Secretary C. G. S. Follows to discuss the controversial issue of introducing new tax. Members included Arthur Morse, chief manager and chairman of the Hongkong and Shanghai Banking Corporation and unofficial member of the Executive Council and another unofficial member of the Legislative Council, Man-kam Lo. Gillespie believed that an income tax was the best form of taxation "provided it was equitably collected." The government eventually introduced the Inland Revenue as a result. Although Gillespie supported the bill, he was concerned the government might have no qualified staff to collect tax.

Ronald Dare Gillespie was son of George Gillespie and Florence Adelaide Hebden. He married Kathleen Little. He died at the Old House, Milford-on-Sea, near Lymington, Hampshire on 8 April 1981.

Business positions
Preceded by Pacific War	Chairman of the Hong Kong General Chamber of Commerce; 1946–1948	Succeeded by Charles Collingwood Roberts
Legislative Council of Hong Kong
Preceded by British Military Administration	Unofficial Member; Representative for Hong Kong General Chamber of Commerce; 1946–1948	Succeeded by Charles Collingwood Roberts
