= Gordon Robert Archibald =

Scottish painter

- Born: 27 October 1905; Falkirk, Scotland
- Died: 8 November 1980 (aged 75); Aberdeen, Scotland
- Known for: Watercolours of landscapes
- Elected: RSW

Gordon Robert Archibald (27 October 1905 - 8 November 1980) was a Scottish painter.

== Life ==
His father was Richard Archibald (c. 1878 - 19 September 1945), a police clerk from Bothwell, Lanarkshire.

His mother was Margaret Watson Kennedy. Richard and Margaret married on 9 June 1904 in Uphall, West Lothian.

Gordon Robert Archibald was born at 15 Scotia Place, Falkirk on 27 October 1905.

He married Emily May Forsyth (c. 1908 - 10 September 1967) on 1 August 1942 in Forres, Moray.

== Art ==
While at 13 Alexandra Avenue, Stepps, in 1929 he exhibited at the Royal Scottish Academy his work: The Scaffold, Glasgow Cathedral.

While at 15 Union Terrace, Aberdeen, in 1940 he exhibited at the Royal Scottish Academy his works: Rue St. Julien Le Pauvre, Paris and Gairnside.

While at 31 Whitehall Road, Aberdeen, in 1943 he exhibited at the Royal Scottish Academy his works: On Dinnet Moor, Kirkcudbright and Old Soldier.

While at 156 Mid Stocket Road, Aberdeen, in 1961 he exhibited at the Royal Scottish Academy his works: Torphins Landscape and Upland Harvest, Torphins.

In 1970 he exhibited at the Royal Scottish Academy his work: Market Vista.

He also exhibited at the Royal Glasgow Institute of the Fine Arts.

== Death ==
He died at his home on 156 Mid Stocket Road, Aberdeen on Saturday 8 November 1980.

From the Aberdeen Evening Express of Monday 10 November 1980:

PROMINENT ABERDEEN ARTIST DIES IN ABERDEEN. A man who was superintendent of art in Aberdeen schools for 23 years has died. Mr. Gordon Archibald, 156 Mid Stocket Road, came to Aberdeen from Glasgow in 1938 and was principal teacher of art at Central School, now Hazlehead Academy, until his appointment as superintendent in 1947. He was a talented artist in his own right and exhibited drawings and paintings. One of his water colours was bought for Glasgow Art Gallery’s permanent collection in 1955. Mr Archibald, who retired In 1970, was elected a member of the Society of Scottish Artists in 1946 and seven years later became a member of the Royal Scottish Water Colours Society. He survived by a wife and son.

From the Aberdeen Press and Journal of Tuesday 11 November 1980:

Retired art teacher dies. A former art superintendent in Aberdeen schools, Mr Gordon Archibald, 156 Mid Stocket Road, has died. Mr. Archibald moved Aberdeen from Glasgow in 1938 and was principal teacher of art at Central School (now Hazlehead Academy) until his appointment to art superintendent in 1947. He held that post for 23 years, retiring in 1970. Mr Archibald was a talented artist and had exhibitions of his drawings and paintings. He was an elected member of Scottish Artists [sic] in 1946 and 1953 became a member of the Royal Scottish Water Colours Society.

== Works ==
McLean Museum and Art Gallery in Greenock holds some of his work.

His 1944 work Harvest, Feughside has been to auction.

His work from 1956, Bannermill Bridge, Aberdeen is with Aberdeen City Galleries.

His work from 1959, Home Farm, Dalvey, Morayshire is with Aberdeen City Galleries.

His work Contemplation has been to auction.

His 1979 work Near Echt Aberdeenshire has been to auction.
