= Nuns and Soldiers =

Novel by Iris Murdoch

- First edition cover
- Author: Iris Murdoch
- Cover artist: Will Carter
- Language: English
- Publisher: Chatto and Windus
- Publication date: Sep 1980
- Publication place: United Kingdom
- Media type: Print
- Pages: 512
- ISBN: 0-7011-2519-5

Nuns and Soldiers is a 1980 novel by Iris Murdoch. It is set in contemporary London and partially in the French countryside. It follows the romantic entanglement of Gertrude, a widow, and Tim, who was the mentee of Gertrude's late husband. Other characters include Gertrude's best friend Ann Cavidge, an ex-nun, and Daisy, Tim's girlfriend.

== Plot ==
Guy Openshaw is 44 years old, bedridden while dying of cancer, and he cannot stand the stream of visitors to his London flat. His wife Gertrude entertains the drop-ins, Guy's friends who used to come by together after work to drink and chat. The visitors all relied on Guy for advice and money, and as he dies the varied people in the novel begin to fray. Gertrude is assisted in looking after Guy by Anne Cavidge, an old friend who has recently left the nunnery she had entered fifteen years earlier.

One of the visitors to the Openshaw flat is Tim Reede, an artist who cannot sell his work and who is lost without Guy’s financial support. He has a girlfriend named Daisy who dresses like a punk and talks and drinks like a sailor. Daisy makes Tim visit Gertrude once Guy has passed and ask her for money, but Gertrude begins questioning Tim about his craft and winds up wanting to support him by paying him run to take care of her home in the French countryside and work on his painting. Gertrude and Tim fall in love when they are both staying in the house, though Tim has not broken up with Daisy and lies about it to Gertrude.

The Tim-Gertrude affair and subsequent marriage is the heart of the book. Some of Gertrude’s circle are concerned about it, but most are either in love with her or what she could do for them with Guy’s inheritance.

== Critical reception ==
Writing in The New York Times, George Stade found: "There are lots of symbols in this novel. There are symbolic rocks, rugs, birds, an orchestra of china monkeys, a patch of cliff that looks like 'a head wearing a crown', its brow creepy with vines and its cheeks weepy from a hidden spring, things like that. When standing there before that face, even Tim feels 'full of grace'." Noting references to James Joyce's Ulysses he added, "Speaking of Joyce, I should mention the prose of Nuns and Soldiers. Mostly it is nondescript. But when it dwells on the characters' transports of silent suffering or loquacious rapture ('He wanted to cry aloud and fall down and embrace her knees and kiss her feet'), when it dwells on the costumes of the women, then the prose is like that in the Nausikaa episode of Ulysses, but without the irony. Joyce himself, in a letter, described it as 'a namby-pamby jammy marmalady drawersy ... style with effects of incense, mariolatry, masturbation, stewed cockles. ...' Iris Murdoch's style is more genteel, however: stewed prunes instead of cockles". Unimpressed, Stade concluded, "Writing this bad cannot be faked; more likely it gushes straight from the unrelieved sincerity of an author who needs mostly to deceive herself. A (rhetorical) question of Anne's, I take it, puts into words the conscious informing sentiment of these novels: 'Can anyone who has had it really give up the concept of God? The craving for God, once fully established, is perhaps incurable.' No doubt, but my own feeling is that sex this far sublimated is not more than the thing itself, but less. I much prefer to take my erotic fantasies raw. They are more nutritious that way."

Graham Hough was also unimpressed, beginning his review in the London Review of Books by stating: "Even to Iris Murdoch fans, of whom I am one of the most constant, Nuns and Soldiers will be a disappointment. It is a long solid book, purposely digressive, and there is a good deal of hard slogging before we get to the main theme. The title promises more than the performance. There is only one nun and no soldiers at all." He added, "The married life of Gertrude and Guy is presented as so insufferably mature, cultivated, public-spirited and smug that the reader's first instinct is to close the book before it has begun and forswear the society of mature, cultivated, public-spirited persons for the rest of time." Hough concluded, "But Iris Murdoch's writing has the power to engage the reader in its conflicts, even without the pleasures of recognition or sympathy; and though they are slow in developing, the conflicts are not absent. […] And as always with Iris Murdoch, the apparent moral simplicities prove ambiguous or uncertain."
