= Kathleen Hewitt =

British author and playwright

- Born: 11 November 1893; Darjeeling, West Bengal, India
- Died: 12 June 1980 (aged 86); London, England
- Occupations: Author; playwright
- Spouse: Neville Sotheby Pitcher (divorced)
- Writing career
- Pen name: Dorothea Martin

Kathleen Hewitt (b. Darjeeling, 11 November 1893 – d. London, 12 June 1980) was a British author and playwright. She wrote more than 20 novels during her lifetime. She also wrote at least one novel under the pseudonym Dorothea Martin, and edited the writing of West African journalist Marjorie Mensah. Hewitt mainly wrote mystery and thriller novels, with a style comparable to Agatha Christie. She was married to the marine painter Neville Sotheby Pitcher, whom she later divorced. Hewitt was also a frequent contributor to Lilliput magazine. Her plays included The Man Who Meant Well and African Shadows.

Kathleen Hewitt was part of the 1930s artistic set in London that included Meum Stewart, Jacob Epstein and Dylan Thomas. She was a friend of the poet Roy Campbell and his wife Mary Campbell, a painter, and dedicated her book Decoration to them. She lived at various times in South Africa and Nigeria, in Reading, Berks, and Brighton, Sussex. In London she lived in the Edgware Road and at 2 Coningsby Road, South Ealing.

== Books ==
- Mardi (1932)
- A Pattern in Yellow (1932)
- Fetish (1933)
- Us Women: Extracts from the Writings of Marjorie Mensah (1933), ed. Kathleen Hewitt
- Black Sunshine (1933), under the name Dorothea Martin
- Strange Salvation (1934)
- Comedian (1934)
- Decoration (1935), a modern satire
- Return to the River (1936)
- Go Find A Shadow (1937)
- The House by the Canal (1938)
- The Golden Milestone (1939)
- No Time To Play (1939)
- Stand-in For Danger (1940)
- Lady Gone Astray (1941)
- The Mice Are Not Amused (1942)
- Plenty Under The Counter (1943). Re-published by the Imperial War Museum, 2019
- The Only Paradise (1945), an autobiography
- Thanks for the Apple (1947)
- Murder in the Ballroom (1948)
- Still The World Is Young (1951)
- Three Rainbows (1952)
- One Man's Woman (1954)
- Harmony in Autumn (1955)

Murder in the Ballroom has been adapted for the stage by Eddie Lewisohn.
