= James Bruce-Jones =

Scottish first-class cricketer (1910–1943)

Personal information
- Full name: James Bruce-Jones
- Born: 19 August 1910; Larbert, Stirlingshire, Scotland
- Died: 29 April 1943 (aged 32); Enfidaville, French Tunisia
- Batting: Right-handed

Domestic team information
- Years: Team
- 1936–1937: Scotland

Career statistics
Competition	First-class
Matches	2
Runs scored	91
Batting average	22.75
100s/50s	–/–
Top score	47
Catches/stumpings	–/–
- Source: Cricinfo, 22 October 2022

James Bruce-Jones (19 August 1910 — 29 April 1943) was a Scottish first-class cricketer and British Army officer.

The son of Captain Thomas Bruce-Jones OBE and his wife, Edith Bruce-Jones, he was born in August 1910 at Larbert, Stirlingshire. He was educated at Altenburn School at Nairn, before attending Charterhouse School in England. He subsequently worked for the family timber and foundry business, becoming its director. A club cricketer for both Stirling County and Grange, Bruce-Jones made two appearances in first-class cricket for Scotland against Ireland at Edinburgh in 1936 and Belfast in 1937. He scored a total of 91 runs in his two first-class matches, with a highest score of 47.

Shortly before the start of the Second World War, Bruce-Jones was commissioned as a second lieutenant in the 7th Battalion, Argyll and Sutherland Highlanders in May 1939. Serving in the war, he held the rank of captain by September 1941. Bruce-Jones saw action in the North African campaign, during which he was wounded in action in Tunisia and subsequently died from his wounds at Enfidaville on 29 April 1943. He was posthumously mentioned in dispatches in September 1943 for gallant and distinguished service during the North African campaign.
