= Bruce Digby-Worsley =

British WWI flying ace (1899–1980)

Ernest Bruce Digby-Worsley
- Born: 6 February 1899; Gloucester, Gloucestershire, England
- Died: 19 February 1980 (aged 81); Hastings, Sussex, England
- Military career
- Allegiance: United Kingdom
- Branch: British Army; Royal Air Force
- Service years: 1914–1919
- Rank: Second Lieutenant
- Service number: 31094
- Units: Gloucestershire Regiment; Middlesex Regiment; King's Own Scottish Borderers; Royal Flying Corps; No. 88 Squadron RAF

Second Lieutenant Bruce Digby-Worsley was a World War I British flying ace credited with 16 aerial victories between June and September 1918.

== Background ==
Ernest Bruce Digby-Worsley was born on 6 February 1899 in Gloucester, England and died in 1980 in Hastings, England. At the time of his enlistment in 1914, he was a 15-year-old schoolboy living in the parental home at 25 Arthur Street in Gloucester. He falsified his age (and place of birth) to enlist in the local Territorial Force battalion, claiming that he was 19 years of age. In 1916, Digby-Worsley was evacuated from France to the Red Cross Hospital in Gloucester with a severe case of trench foot, after serving in Flanders for only two months. Digby-Worsley's mother then attempted to have him excused from further duty at the front on grounds of age. By this time, however, Digby-Worsley had already been appointed as a drill instructor, and the Middlesex Regiment clearly felt that his services were needed to train recruits at home, which he did until his transfer to the King's Own Scottish Borderers.

After the war, Digby-Worsley lived at Hargate Forest on Broadwater Down in Tunbridge Wells, Kent. He pursued a successful career in theatrical management, becoming manager of the Sadler's Wells Theatre and the D'Oyly Carte Opera Company.

== Military career ==
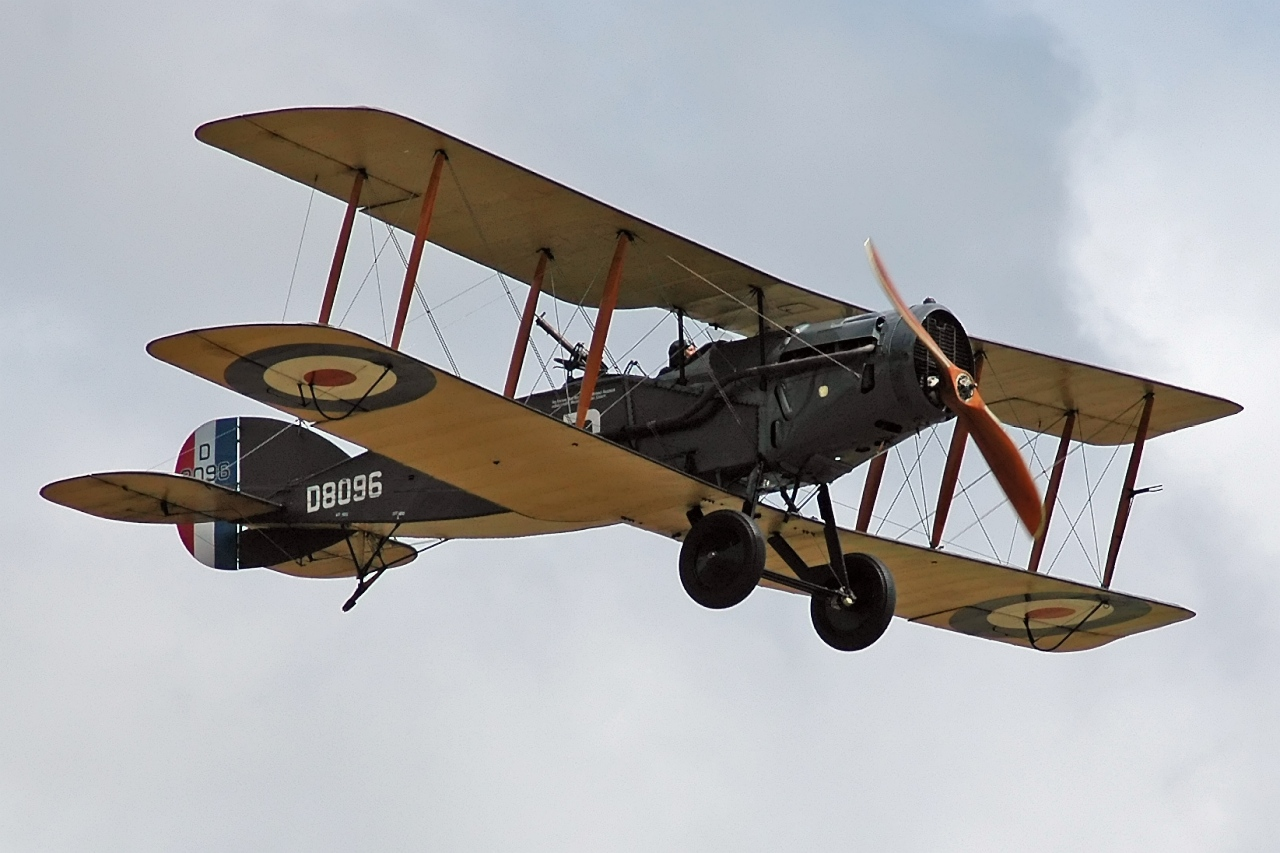
Digby-Worsley earned all of his victories in the Bristol F.2b.

Bruce Digby-Worsley enlisted in the territorials on 21 September 1914 and served with the 2/5th Gloucestershire Regiment (TF) until July 1915. He was then transferred to the Regular Army and served with the 16th and 24th Middlesex Regiment until March 1917, and the 2/5th King's Own Scottish Borderers (TF) until August 1917, receiving a promotion to lance-corporal in June 1917. Digby-Worsley then transferred to the Royal Flying Corps as an officer cadet (29 August 1917) and received his commission on 3 January 1918, with the rank of probationary second lieutenant. Digby-Worsley returned to France in April 1918, assigned to No. 88 Squadron of the Royal Air Force. The London Gazette announced that probationary Second Lieutenant Digby-Worsley (late General List, Royal Flying Corps) was confirmed in his rank as second lieutenant (observer officer), as of 24 July 1918.

Digby-Worsley is credited with 16 aerial victories, all of them as an observer in a Bristol F.2b, and all within a mere four months of operations. The observer's first four victories were from Bristol F.2b (C787) piloted by Lieutenant Kenneth Conn, a Canadian. On 5 June 1918, he scored a double victory, destroying two Albatros D.V aircraft over Messines, West Flanders, Belgium. The following month, on 1 July 1918, Digby-Worsley racked up another double, taking out two Fokker D.VII planes west of Westrozebeke, West Flanders, destroying one in flames and sending the other out of control.

His next seven victories, numbers 5 through 11, were all from Bristol F.2b (C4061), piloted by Lieutenant Charles Findlay, a Scottish flying ace credited with 14 aerial victories. He was credited with his fifth on 30 July 1918 when he sent a Pfalz D.III out of control over Richebourg, France. His sixth kill took place on 6 August 1918, when a Fokker D.VII was destroyed in flames over Ploegsteert, Hainaut, Belgium. This was sweet revenge, for it was at Ploegsteert Wood that his first cousin, Trooper Eardley Gilbert Wallis "Bertie" Digby-Worsley of the 11th Hussars, had been killed in action on 22 October 1914. Bertie Digby Worsley was the third of 58 hussars of the 11th ("Cherry Pickers") to be killed in the First World War.

The next four victories, numbers 7 through 10, all took place on 11 August 1918. In the morning, two Fokker D.VII planes were sent out of control over Clery, France. In the afternoon, two more D.VII planes were taken out over Méricourt, Pas-de-Calais, France, one destroyed in flames, and the other sent out of control. His eleventh kill took place the following day, on 12 August 1918. A Fokker D.VII was destroyed east of Biaches, Somme, France.

Digby-Worsley's remaining victories, numbers 12 through 16, were all from Bristol F.2b (E2216), piloted by Conn, who was the leading ace of No. 88 Squadron with 20 victories. His twelfth took place on 5 September 1918, when a Fokker D.VII was sent out of control northeast of Armentières, Nord, France. On 16 September 1918, he scored a double victory, destroying two Fokker D.VII aircraft northeast of Harbourdin Airfield, near Lille, Nord, France. Four days later, on 20 September 1918, Digby-Worsley racked up another double, sending one Fokker D.VII out of control over Quesnoy, France and destroying another southeast of Quesnoy. The latter was his sixteenth and final victory.

That sixteenth victory for Digby-Worsley was the only one in which the identity of his victim is known. Leutnant Helmut Gantz of Jasta 56 died of his wounds the following day. That last victory was also the only one shared with other crews. It was shared with four other aviators: Captain Edgar Johnston, Lieutenant Walter Grant, Lieutenant George Poole, and Sergeant Charles Hill. Pilot Edgar Johnston was an Australian flying ace who was the recipient of the Distinguished Flying Cross and was credited with twenty aerial victories. His observer Walter Grant was also an Australian flying ace, and was credited with seven aerial victories. Pilot George Poole was a British flying ace credited with five aerial victories. His observer Charles Hill was a British flying ace credited with seven victories.

The London Gazette reported that Digby-Worsley relinquished his commission due to illness that had been contracted while he had been on active service. Further, it was noted that he was permitted to retain his rank. This was to be effective the following day, on 26 April 1919.

== See also ==
- Aerial victory standards of World War I
