= Bill Eastman =

Recipient of the George Cross

William Marsden Eastman
- Born: 26 October 1911; Brentford, England
- Died: 8 April 1980 (aged 68); Sliema, Malta
- Military career
- Allegiance: United Kingdom
- Branch: British Army
- Service years: 1939–1966
- Rank: Brigadier
- Service number: 103900
- Unit: Royal Army Ordnance Corps
- Commands: RAOC Training Centre
- Conflicts: Second World War
- Awards: George Cross

Brigadier William Marsden Eastman, GC (26 October 1911 – 8 April 1980) was a British Army officer who was awarded the George Cross for bomb disposal work between June and November 1940 on the island of Malta.

== Early life and career ==
Born in Brentford on 26 October 1911, Eastman was educated at Uppingham School and the University of Cambridge. His university studies were interrupted by his father's death, as he had to take over the family dyeing and dry-cleaning business. His knowledge of chemicals learned through this career led to him being recommended for a commission in the Royal Army Ordnance Corps on volunteering shortly before the outbreak of the Second World War. Having then attended the Inspecting Ordnance Officer's course at Bramley, he was embarked for Malta in March 1940.

== Bomb disposal work ==
Between June and November 1940 the island of Malta came under the combined attack from German and Italian airforces. As no Royal Engineer bomb disposal units had yet been formed, the job of attending to unexploded bombs and mines was handled by the Royal Army Ordnance Corps. A high number of unexploded bombs needed defusing and Eastman, along with Robert Jephson Jones rendered safe some 275 devices with rudimentary equipment.

=== George Cross citation ===
Notice of his award appeared in the London Gazette on Christmas Eve, 1940.

On various dates Lieutenant Eastman, with Captain R. L. J. Jones, R.A.O.C., worked under dangerous and trying conditions and performed acts of considerable gallantry in dealing with large numbers of various unexploded bombs, some of which were in a highly dangerous state and of the German delay type.

On one occasion, these officers showed particular gallantry in dealing with an 1100lb. German bomb. Two attempts were made to explode this bomb but it failed to detonate; at the third attempt when it was in a most dangerous state, they succeeded in detonating it.

On a second occasion, these officers, assisted by a Master Rigger of H.M. Dockyard, succeeded in removing a 400lb. high explosive Italian unexploded bomb which had been under water for a week in a 20ft. deep well inside a house. This bomb, fused at both ends, was in a dangerous state. It had to be raised to the ground floor by means of a gin, tackle, sling and ropes. This operation was doubly dangerous, as: (a) There was a possibility of the sling slipping while the bomb was being hauled up and (b) The bomb was two and half ft. long, the mouth of the well three ft. one inch wide, and for safety the bomb had to be kept horizontal, if possible, and pulled up thus. Lieutenant Eastman assisted the Master Rigger, guided the bomb from the floor of the well, and Captain Jones went to the top to guide it through the opening. They succeeded in getting the bomb out although there was only a six-inch clearance as it came through the mouth of the well.

— London Gazette

== Post-war career ==
After the war he commanded the RAOC Training Centre until his retirement in 1966, when he retired with his wife to Malta, where he died, and is buried in the Ta' Braxia Cemetery in Pietà.

== Sale of medals ==
Eastman's medals were sold at auction in 2008. They sold for a then world record amount of £49,450 and were acquired by Eastman's regimental museum.

== Sources ==
- George Cross database, Retrieved 19 November 2007.
