= J. R. James =

British town planner

John Richings "Jimmy" James OBE (27 October 1912 – 22 September 1980) was a British town planner who was influential in the era following the Second World War, and was Chief Planner at the Ministry of Housing and Local Government from 1961 to 1967. It was said of him that "no-one in post-war Britain matched the range of the beneficial influences of his work" in town and country planning.

He was born in Stanley, County Durham, and was educated at Wolsingham County Grammar School and King's College London, graduating with a degree in geography in 1935. In the Second World War, he worked in Naval Intelligence, providing information on Greece. He worked in London for the Ministry of Housing and Local Government from 1949.

He had responsibility for leading the development of new towns at Newton Aycliffe and Peterlee in the 1950s. He was Chief Planner to the UK government from 1961, a member of Peterborough Development Corporation, and from 1970 was the first Professor of Town and Regional Planning at the University of Sheffield. He also worked for the United Nations in India, Bangladesh, Japan and the Middle East.

He was awarded the OBE in 1956, and became a Companion of the Order of the Bath in 1966. He was President of the Geographical Association, which had its HQ in Sheffield at the time, in 1969. He died in Sheffield in 1980 at the age of 67.

A collection of almost 4,000 photographic slides left by James, showing major building projects across the country during the post-war period, was digitised and made available online by the University of Sheffield in 2014.
