= John Armitage (editor) =

British editor and writer

- Born: 25 September 1910
- Died: 1 February 1980 (aged 69)
- Education: Emmanuel College, Cambridge
- Occupation: Editor
- Military career
- Allegiance: Great Britain
- Branch: Royal Air Force
- Rank: Squadron leader
- Conflicts: World War II

John Armitage (25 September 1910 – 1 February 1980) was the British editor of Encyclopædia Britannica.

== Biography ==
Born on 25 September 1910, John Armitage was educated at Bedford School and at Emmanuel College, Cambridge. He was Assistant Editor and then Editor of The Fortnightly Review, between 1937 and 1954. During the Second World War he served in the Royal Air Force and was promoted to the rank of Squadron Leader. He was on the editorial staff of the Times Educational Supplement, between 1946 and 1949, and was British editor of Encyclopædia Britannica, between 1949 and 1967.

John Armitage was Chairman of the Liberal Party's Education Advisory Committee between 1948 and 1956. He died on 1 February 1980, aged 69.

== Publications ==
- A History of Ball Games and Rugby Fives, Lonsdale Library, 1934
- To Christian England, 1942
- Europe in Bondage, 1943
- Partnership in Education, 1948
- Encyclopædia Britannica, 14th and 15th editions, 1949–1967
- Britannica Book of the Year, 1950–1965
- The Unservile State, 1957
- Children's Britannica, 1960
- Our Children’s Education, 1960
- The Oxford Companion to Sports and Games, 1975
- Man at Play, 1977
