= Norman Hargreaves-Mawdsley =

British historian (1921–1980)

- Born: William Norman Hargreaves-Mawdsley; 13 November 1921; Bristol, United Kingdom
- Died: 11 April 1980 (aged 58); Brandon, Manitoba, Canada
- Occupations: historian, scholar of legal and academic dress
- Spouse: Josefina Laguens

William Norman Hargreaves-Mawdsley (13 November 1921 – 11 April 1980) was a British historian, and expert on the history of legal and academic dress.

== Biography ==
Hargreaves-Mawdsley was born in Bristol in 1921, where he attended Clifton College prior to matriculating at Oriel College, Oxford in 1940, where he read Classics and Modern History. His academic studies were interrupted by World War II, during which he served in the Royal Army Ordnance Corps for five years, before returning to Oxford in 1946. He graduated in 1948 and in 1955 commenced postgraduate research on the history of academic and legal dress. He submitted his thesis in 1958 and was duly awarded the degree of DPhil. This thesis was embargoed in perpetuity at the author's request, but the Bodleian Library's catalogue indicates that it comprises 753 pages in three volumes, and the substantive content was published by the Clarendon Press in 1963 in two volumes.

After completing his doctoral research, he was appointed a tutor and librarian at Exeter College, Oxford, after which he took up a research fellowship at the University of Edinburgh (1961–1964), followed by a lectureship in history at the University of St Andrews (1964–1970). He spent part of 1970 as a visiting professor at the University of South Carolina before his appointment later that year as professor and head of the Department of History at Brandon University in Manitoba. He and his wife Josefina, whom he had married in 1959, returned to Oxford during the university vacations. Between 1967 and 1979 he wrote several books on a variety of historical topics, many related to England and Spain during the seventeenth and eighteenth centuries. He died suddenly of a heart attack in April 1980, while attending a university committee meeting.

== Bibliography ==
- Hargreaves-Mawdsley, W N (1963). A History of Academical Dress in Europe until the End of the Eighteenth Century. Oxford: Clarendon Press.
- Hargreaves-Mawdsley, W N (1963). A History of Legal Dress in Europe until the End of the Eighteenth Century. Oxford: Clarendon Press.
- Hargreaves-Mawdsley, W N (1967). The English Della Cruscans and Their Age, 1783–1828. The Hague: Martinus Nijhoff.
- Hargreaves-Mawdsley, W N (1968). Everyman's Dictionary of European Writers. London: Dent. ISBN 0460030191.
- Hargreaves-Mawdsley, W N (1969). Woodforde at Oxford 1759–1776: Extracts from his Diary. Oxford: Clarendon Press / Oxford Historical Society. ISBN 0901775010.
- Hargreaves-Mawdsley, W N (1973). Spain under the Bourbons 1700–1833: A Collection of Documents. London: Macmillan. ISBN 0333106849.
- Hargreaves-Mawdsley, W N (1973). Oxford in the age of John Locke. Norman, Oklahoma: University of Oklahoma Press. ISBN 0806110384.
- Hargreaves-Mawdsley, W N (1979). Eighteenth-Century Spain 1700–1788: A Political, Diplomatic and Institutional History. London: Macmillan. ISBN 0333146123.
