= William Ritchie Russell =

Scottish neurologist (1903–1980)

William Ritchie Russell CBE FRSE (7 February 1903 – 8 December 1980) was a 20th-century Scottish neurologist.

== Life ==
Russell was born in Edinburgh on 7 February 1903 the eldest of six children of Beatrice Ritchie, the daughter of civil engineer James Ritchie, and William Russell, Professor of Medicine at the University of Edinburgh. The family lived at 3 Walker Street in Edinburgh's West End.

He was educated at Edinburgh Academy then studied medicine at the University of Edinburgh (partly under his father). He graduated with an MB ChB in 1926 and then became a physician and house surgeon at Edinburgh Royal Infirmary on Lauriston Place. In 1928 he moved to London as resident medical officer at the National Hospital on Queen Square. In 1930 he returned to Edinburgh as a tutor under a Medical Research Council grant. He received his doctorate (MD) in 1932.

In 1934 he was elected a member of the Harveian Society of Edinburgh. In 1937 he was elected a Fellow of the Royal Society of Edinburgh. His proposers were Edwin Bramwell, Sir Robert Philip, Arthur Logan Turner and Sir Sydney Alfred Smith.

In 1938 he began lecturing in neurology. In the Second World War he served with the Royal Army Medical Corps at the Military Hospital for Head Injuries in Oxford and as Consultant Neurologist to the forces in the Middle East, rising to the rank of Brigadier. He became an expert on gunshot wounds to the head. Another of his classic works was the relation of traumatic amnesia to the severity of head injury.

In 1945 Sir Hugh Cairns appointed him as consultant neurologist to the RAMC (based in Oxford). In 1952 he was created a Commander of the Order of the British Empire (CBE).

In 1966 he became the first Professor of Neurology at the University of Oxford. Over and above his interests in brain surgery he became an expert in polio following the post-war epidemic which began in Britain after the war.

He helped to design a block of flats for the elderly, named Ritchie Court (off Banbury Road in Oxford) in his honour. He lived his final years there and died on 8 December 1980.

== Family ==
In 1932 he married Jane Stuart Low. They had a daughter and a son.

His brother Scott Russell was Professor of Obstetrics and Gynaecology at Sheffield University.

== Publications ==
- Poliomyelitis (1952); 2nd edition (1956)
- The Traumatic Amnesias (1971)
- Explaining the Brain (1975)
- Multiple Sclerosis: Control of the Disease (1976)

From 1948 to 1969 he was Editor of the "Journal of Neurology, Neurosurgery, and Psychiatry"
