= Adam Henry Robson =

British educationist and Royal Air Force officer

- Born: 3 August 1892
- Died: 9 October 1980 (aged 88)
- Military career
- Allegiance: United Kingdom
- Branch: British Army; Royal Air Force
- Rank: Air vice-marshal
- Conflicts: World War I World War II
- Awards: Companion of the Order of the Bath; Officer of the Order of the British Empire; Military Cross & Bar

Air vice-marshal Adam Henry Robson, CB, OBE, MC & Bar (3 August 1892 – 9 October 1980) was a British educationist and a senior officer of the Royal Air Force.

After being educated at Armstrong College, Newcastle (part of Durham University), Robson joined the Durham Light Infantry on the outbreak of the First World War and served until 1919, being thrice wounded and twice winning the Military Cross. Following demobilisation he worked for the county educational committee of Dorset for three years before joining the RAF Educational Service in 1923. He rose to become the Director of Educational Services for the Royal Air Force from 1944, during which time he was also a member of the executive committee for the National Institute of Adult Education and the National Foundation for Educational Research, as well as a member of the governing body of the School of Oriental and African Studies. He retired from these posts in 1952.
