= C. C. Roberts =

British entrepreneur

Unofficial Member of the Legislative Council of Hong Kong
- In office 31 October 1946 – 28 July 1948
- Preceded by: R. D. Gillespie
- Succeeded by: P. S. Cassidy

Personal details
- Born: 6 July 1900 Huddersfield, Yorkshire, England
- Died: 17 May 1980 (aged 79) Midhurst, Sussex, England
- Spouse: Constance May Mitchell
- Occupation: Entrepreneur

Charles Collingwood Roberts (6 July 1900 – 17 May 1980) was a British entrepreneur. He was a former chairman of the Butterfield & Swire and an unofficial member of the Legislative Council of Hong Kong.

== Biography ==
Roberts joined Butterfield and Swire in October 1922, responsible for sugar traveling from Shanghai from 1925 to 1926, shore management for China Navigation Company in Hankow from 1926 to 1928, and responsible for Chinese Staff Shanghai from 1932 to 1934. On 1 October 1932, Roberts married to Constance May Mitchell at the St. John's Cathedral.

During the Japanese occupation of Hong Kong, he was among many other British local figures who were held at the Block 8 of the St. Stephen College and participated in the camp councils.

After the war, Roberts became the first chairman of the Cathay Pacific Airways, the airline which was acquired by Butterfield & Swire and its associated shipping interests in 1948. At that time, he co-founded the Hong Kong Aircraft Engineering Company with David F. Landale, taipan of the Jardine Matheson and founder of the Hong Kong Airways in 1950.

In 1948 and 1950, he was the chairman of the Hong Kong General Chamber of Commerce. After the resignation of R. D. Gillespie, he was elected by the chamber to be the representative on the Legislative Council of Hong Kong on 6 May, until he stepped down in August and was replaced by P. S. Cassidy.

He was also deputy chairman of the Hongkong and Shanghai Banking Corporation in 1940–41 and director of the bank.

Business positions
Preceded by R. D. Gillespie	Chairman of the Hong Kong General Chamber of Commerce; 1948	Succeeded by P. S. Cassidy
Preceded by P. S. Cassidy	Chairman of the Hong Kong General Chamber of Commerce; 1950	Succeeded by P. S. Cassidy
Legislative Council of Hong Kong
Preceded by R. D. Gillespie	Unofficial Member; Representative for Hong Kong General Chamber of Commerce; 1948	Succeeded by P. S. Cassidy
