= Cyril Mann =

English painter

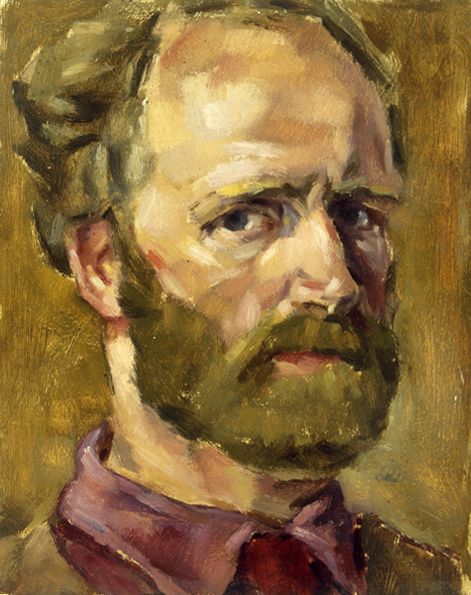
- Cyril Mann, self-portrait, c 1950. Oil on board, 49.5x 44.5 cm
- Born: 28 May 1911; London, England
- Died: 7 January 1980 (aged 68)
- Education: Nottingham School of Art
- Occupations: Painter and sculptor
- Website: Cyril Mann website

Cyril Mann (28 May 1911 – 7 January 1980) was a British painter and sculptor who added a new dimension to figurative art by exploring the dynamic effects of sunlight in a different way from his predecessors. The artist also completed a number of sculptures, including a commission to carve a family crest for a manor house.

== Biography ==
Mann was born in London, England, on 28 May 1911. He spent most of his childhood in Nottingham, where, at the age of 14, he was the youngest boy at the time to be awarded a scholarship to study at the Nottingham School of Art.

Two years later he left for Canada, hoping to become a missionary. After giving up religion and while working at various jobs in British Columbia – including mining, logging and printing – Mann was inspired by the beauty of the landscape to start painting again. In Vancouver he met Arthur Lismer, a portrait painter originally from Sheffield who was a member of the Canadian Group of Seven. Lismer advised the young man to return to England and continue his art studies there.

He returned to London in 1933. He continued drawing and painting water colours around the Little Venice canal in Maida Vale, a neighbourhood in West London.

He met the Rev. Oliver Fielding Clark, who admired his work. Clark helped to set up a trust fund, enabling Mann to study at the Royal Academy. He gained admission in 1935 on the strength of his water colours. After three years there, Mann continued his art education in Paris, supported by his art patron, Erica Marx.

He returned to England with his first wife, Mary Jervis Read, at the outbreak of war. Their daughter, Sylvia, was born in 1940. Throughout the war, Mann served as a Gunner in the Royal Artillery but was never appointed an official war artist.

From 1956 to 1964, Mann lived in Bevin Court, Islington, London where a wall plaque recording his life was unveiled in 2013.

== Art and career ==
In an art career that spanned nearly half a century, the effects of light and shadow remained a lifelong fascination. In his earliest work done in Paris and London, the artist paints facing the sun. These small-scale works of urban scenes tend to be monochromatic and done from preliminary sketches.

For three years, from the early to mid-1950s, Mann painted in artificial light, focusing on the three-dimensional shape of shadows cast by household objects. This development, known as the "solid-shadow period", was important to Mann's artistic development, as he used strong, intense colouring with a formalised line for the first time.

In his final phase, from the 1960s onwards – when, coincidentally, he married his second wife, the Dutch-Indonesian Renske van Slooten, who was 28 years his junior – Mann painted the dynamic effects of light and shadow. He uses as his inspiration nudes of his young wife, as well as sunlit interiors, flowers, self-portraits and anything else at hand, such as an oil can, a stapler, and toys from his second daughter, Amanda, born in 1968. There is a sense of release as these now often large oils are painted directly and at great speed.

== Death ==
Mann died on 7 January 1980, aged 68, after suffering years of mental instability and heart disease. His last self-portrait, entitled "Ecce Homo" (or "Behold The Mann"), shows the artist defiantly posing nude, between two earlier self-portraits.

== Exhibitions and commissions ==
- 1948: Group Show, "Artists of Fame and Promise", Wildenstein Gallery, Bond Street
- 1950s: Solo show, Park Row Gallery, Nottingham
- 1950s: Two-man show with Anne Estelle Rice, Brook Street Gallery
- 1950s: Mixed shows at the Hanover Gallery
- 1950s: East End Academy, Whitechapel Gallery
- 1950s: Several shows at the Archer Gallery
- 1958: Completes large sculpture commission including a crest for a manor house
- 1963: Solo show St Martin's Gallery, near St Martin's Lane
- 1964: Solo show at Rawinski Gallery, Soho
- 1965: Paintings selected for opening show at Alwin Gallery, Brook Street
- 1966: Joins and exhibits with Contemporary Portrait Society
- 1967: Two-man show at Alwin Gallery
- 1968: Third two-man show at Alwin Gallery
- 1970s: Shows with Contemporary Portrait Society at various galleries, including Upper Grosvenor Gallery
- 1970s: Private exhibitions backed by Dr and Mrs M Leibson, patrons of the artist for many years
- 1978: Solo show at the Ogle Gallery, Eastbourne
- 1990: Retrospective: Museum of St John & Jerusalem, Islington, London
- 1992: Piano Nobile Gallery, "Cyril Mann – a Tribute to the artist and his work
- 1994: Piano Nobile Gallery, "Cyril Mann – Works on Paper"
- 2018: Piano Nobile Gallery, "Cyril Mann - The Solid Shadow Paintings"
- 2019: The Lightbox Gallery, Woking, "Cyril Mann - Painter of Light and Shadow"

== Public collections ==
- Guildhall Museum and Art Gallery, London
- William Morris Museum, Walthamstow, London

== Publications about Cyril Mann ==
- Taylor, John Russell. The Sun is God – the Life and Work of Cyril Mann. Lund Humphreys, 2000.
- Vann, Philip. Face to Face: British Portraits in the 20th Century. Sansom & Co, 2004.
- Eddy, David Hamilton. "Genius of the Ordinary". The Times Higher Education Supplement, 16 October 1992.
- "Cyril Mann". Arts Review, October 1992.
- Barnes, Rachel. "Cyril Mann". Galleries Magazine, 1993.
- "Twentieth Century Top 20". Antiques Magazine, Issue 801, October 1999.
- "Tribute to a Great Mann". Waltham Forest Guardian, 30 September 1999.
- "Recognition of a genius at last?" Antique Trades Gazette, 2 October 1999.
- Miller, Keith. "In Brief: The Sun is God". The Times Literary Supplement, 5 November 1999.
