= David Lowe (horticulturalist) =

Sir David Lowe CBE FRSE DL (12 May 1899 – 3 November 1980) was a Scottish horticulturalist and businessman. He was Chairman of Elvingston Estates in East Lothian. In horticulture he did much to promote the daffodil.

== Life ==
He was born in Musselburgh in East Lothian on 12 May 1899 the eldest son of David Lowe, Provost of Musselburgh. He was educated at Musselburgh Grammar School.

In the First World War he was an Observer in the Royal Flying Corps. From the 1930s onwards he proved a highly successful businessman and rose to be President of the Edinburgh Chamber of Commerce and President of the National Farmers Union.

In 1935 as a member of the Royal Aero Club, describing himself as a Farmer at Burnside, Prestonpans he passed pilots license taking his test taken in a De Havilland Moth.

In 1950 he was made a Commander of the Order of the British Empire (CBE). In 1961 he was elected a Fellow of the Royal Society of Edinburgh. His proposers were Stephen J Watson, Sir Edmund Hudson, Alexander M Smith, and Alan William Greenwood.

He was knighted by Queen Elizabeth II in 1962.

Also in 1962 he was appointed chairman of the Livingston, West Lothian Town Corporation, overseeing the development of 6,692 acres (2,708 hectares) acres in Mid and West Lothian into the fourth post-Second World War new town to be built in Scotland. The first tenants to be housed by 1964.

In 1966 he received an honorary doctorate (DSc) from the University of Edinburgh.

His hobby was breeding rare daffodils. He acquired some of his narcissi stock from the Brodie of Brodie and he concentrated on pale yellow varieties.

He died in Haddington on 3 November 1980.

== Family ==
In 1932 he married Katherine Ross, the daughter of Roderick Ross CVO CBE KPM (1865–1943) the Chief Constable of Edinburgh City Police from 1900 to 1935.
