= Deaths in November 1980 =

The following is a list of notable deaths in November 1980.

Entries for each day are listed alphabetically by surname. A typical entry lists information in the following sequence:

- Name, age, country of citizenship at birth, subsequent country of citizenship (if applicable), reason for notability, cause of death (if known), and reference.

== November 1980 ==
=== 1 ===
- Alphonse Bellier, 94, French auctioneer.
- Frans Detiège, 70, Belgian politician.
- Stick Elliott, 46, American racing driver, cryptococcosis.
- Sherri Jarvis, 14, American unsolved murder victim, strangled.
- Prudent Joye, 66, French Olympic track and field athlete (1936).
- Don Palmer, 52–53, Australian Olympic rower (1952).
- Shorty Price, 59, American lawyer and perennial political candidate, traffic collision.
- Vance Randolph, 88, American folklorist.
- Henri Romans-Petit, 83, French World War II resistance member.
- Arnold Schmitz, 87, German musicologist.
- Frederick C. Schroeder, 70, American politician, member of the Wisconsin State Assembly (1965–1977).
- Edward Wilfred Taylor, 89, British optician.

=== 2 ===
- Hervé Cras, 70, French military historian.
- Piotr Gołębiowski, 78, Polish Roman Catholic prelate.
- Otto Adolf Wenzel Kade, 53, German linguist and translator.
- Yamakawa Kikue, 89, Japanese feminist activist, stroke.
- Willie Sutton, 79, American bank robber, namesake of Sutton's law.
- B. G. L. Swamy, 64, Indian botanist.
- Ivy Tresmand, 81, English actress.

=== 3 ===
- Gordie Bell, 55, Canadian ice hockey player.
- Dennis Burgess, 54, British actor, heart attack.
- Théo Cremnitz, 91, French Olympic rower (1924).
- Rae Crowther, 77, American football player.
- Lyubov Dobrzhanskaya, 74, Soviet singer and actress.
- Ludwig Hohl, 76, Swiss author.
- Bronisław Knaster, 87, Polish mathematician.
- Sir David Lowe, 81, Scottish horticulturalist.
- Hans Ruin, 89, Finnish-Swedish philosopher and writer.

=== 4 ===
- Sir Kenneth Blackburne, 72, British colonial administrator, governor (1957–1962) and governor-general of Jamaica (1962).
- Rosalind Cassidy, 85, American physical educator.
- Paul Kaye, 46, British radio broadcaster.
- Noel Langley, 68, South African-born American playwright, novelist and screenwriter (The Wizard of Oz).
- Elsie MacGill, 75, Canadian aeronautical engineer.
- Tadao Nagahama, 48, Japanese anime director (Robot Romance Trilogy), hepatitis.
- Elisa Nelson, 10, American murder victim, bludgeoned.
- Antonio G. Olivieri, 39, American politician, member of the New York State Assembly (1971–1974), brain cancer.
- Johnny Owen, 24, Welsh boxer, injuries sustained in a boxing match.
- Armand Sylvestre, 70, Canadian politician and jurist.
- Elena Zharkova, 27, Soviet ice dancer.

=== 5 ===
- Mildred Adams, 86, American journalist, translator and writer, heart attack.
- Louis Alter, 78, American pianist and songwriter ("Do You Know What It Means to Miss New Orleans?", "Manhattan Serenade"), pneumonia.
- Caroline Brady, 75, American philologist.
- Jim Brady, 67, British boxer.
- Fred Cahill, 82, Australian politician.
- Rupe Lowell, 87, Australian footballer.
- Betty Mack, 78, American actress.
- Hermann Niehoff, 83, German general.
- Sydney Pope, 82, British flying ace.
- Mohammed Salim, 75–76, Indian footballer.
- J. C. Wetsel, 70, American football player and coach.

=== 6 ===
- Ali Benouna, 73, Algerian footballer.
- Ilia Braunstein, 72, Belgian philatelist.
- Edner Brutus, 69, Haitian diplomat.
- Nevill Coghill, 81, British-Irish literary scholar.
- Ted Davey, 83, Australian footballer.
- Rankin Fite, 64, American politician, member of the Alabama House of Representatives (1950–1974), heart attack.
- Per Gjersøe, 72, Norwegian actor and film director.
- Thomas Hughes, 88, Australian politician.
- Cecil Jenkinson, 89, English cricketer.
- John D. Jernegan, 69, American diplomat.
- Aedy Moward, 50, Indonesian actor.
- Larry Sartori, 63, American football player and coach.
- Mead Schaeffer, 82, American illustrator, heart attack.
- Wilbur Schu, 57, American basketball player, heart attack.
- Lionel Smith, 60, English footballer.
- Theodore Veale, 87, British soldier.
- Pierre Villon, 79, French politician.
- Charles T. Wright, 69, American jurist, complications from diabetes.
- Milton Yakus, 62, American songwriter ("Old Cape Cod"), heart attack.

=== 7 ===
- Aimée Batier, 72, French politician.
- Emilio Cigoli, 70, Italian actor.
- Frank Duff, 91, Irish author and Roman Catholic organizer (Legion of Mary).
- İlhan Erdost, 35, Turkish publisher, bludgeoned.
- Fubuki Koshiji, 56, Japanese actress and singer, stomach cancer.
- Norman Marshall, 78, English theatre director.
- Steve McQueen, 50, American actor (The Sand Pebbles, Bullitt, The Towering Inferno), heart attack.
- Al Ulbrickson Sr., 77, American rower and rowing coach.
- Wolfgang Weyrauch, 76, German journalist and writer.

=== 8 ===
- Gordon Robert Archibald, 75, Scottish painter.
- Claudio Bincaz, 83, Argentine footballer and rugby player.
- Sherm Clark, 80, American Olympic rower (1920).
- Darpan, 51–52, Pakistani actor.
- Friedo Dörfel, 65, German footballer.
- Dale Jones, 61, American baseball player.
- Lulu Latsky, 79, South African zoologist.
- Valerie Myerscough, 38, British astrophysicist.
- Sir James Turner, 1st Baron Netherthorpe, 72, British agriculturalist and life peer.

=== 9 ===
- Patrick Campbell, 3rd Baron Glenavy, 67, British journalist and hereditary peer.
- Gloria Guinness, 68, Mexican socialite and magazine editor, heart attack.
- Hoàng Thị Cúc, 90, Vietnamese royal.
- Charles B. Hoeven, 85, American politician, member of the U.S. House of Representatives (1943–1965).
- Pearl Jephcott, 80, English social researcher.
- Puran Chand Joshi, 73, Indian politician, heart attack.
- Arvīds Ķibilds, 85, Latvian Olympic athlete (1924).
- Carmel Myers, 81, American actress, heart attack.
- Claudia Olsen, 84, Norwegian politician.
- Victor Sen Yung, 65, American actor (Charlie Chan, Bonanza) and chef, carbon monoxide poisoning. (body discovered on this date)
- Jindřich Severa, 71, Czech sculptor.
- Toyen, 78, Czech artist.
- Andreas Paul Weber, 87, German artist.

=== 10 ===
- Marion Ellen Lea Allnutt, 84, Australian welfare worker.
- Dame Jacobena Angliss, 84, Australian philanthropist.
- Carlos Izquierdo Edwards, 84, Chilean politician.
- John Moyney, 85, Irish soldier.
- Karol Pniak, 70, Polish flying ace.
- James Priddey, 64, English artist.
- Sir Samuel Isidore Salmon, 80, British politician and philanthropist.
- Bruno Sterzi, 57–58, Italian racing driver.
- Kristian Strøm, 87, Norwegian speed skater.
- Milan Vidmar Jr., 70, Yugoslavian chess player.
- Helmut Winkler, 65, German geologist.

=== 11 ===
- Renato Barbieri, 77, Italian Olympic rower (1932).
- Vince Gair, 79, Australian politician.
- Sixto Ibáñez, 71, Argentine Olympic racewalker (1948).
- Connie Lewcock, 86, British women's rights activist.
- Anna Maslovskaya, 60, Soviet World War II partisan.
- Sister Matilda, 93, American artist and Roman Catholic nun.
- Benode Behari Mukherjee, 76, Indian artist.
- Shag Sheard, 81, American football player and coach.
- Robert Lee Wolff, 64, American historian, heart attack.

=== 12 ===
- Andrei Amalrik, 42, Soviet writer and dissident, traffic collision.
- John Chetwynd-Talbot, 21st Earl of Shrewsbury, 66, British hereditary peer.
- Harold Dash, 63, American Olympic water polo player (1948).
- Maxim Grabovenko, 57, Soviet Ukrainian soldier.
- Frank Hoddinott, 85, Welsh footballer.
- Robert Nickle, 61, American artist.
- Jim Prior, 57, Irish hurler.
- Vicente Rubi, 77, Filipino musician, prostate cancer.
- Jaroslav Štork, 71, Czechoslovak Olympic racewalker (1936).
- Daniel Thuayre, 56, French racing cyclist.
- Valide Tutayuq, 66, Azerbaijani botanist.
- Haya van Someren, 54, Dutch politician, cancer.
- Georgy Vinogradov, 71, Soviet singer.
- Semyon Volfkovich, 84, Soviet chemist.
- Alexander Voormolen, 85, Dutch composer.
- Susan Wood, 32, Canadian literary critic.

=== 13 ===
- Johannes Bernhardt, 83, Spanish-German general and businessman.
- Patricia Cubbage, 22, American police informant, stabbed.
- Dorothy Grafly, 84, American journalist and art curator.
- Elbridge Ross, 71, American ice hockey player.
- Anna Skeide, 70, Norwegian songwriter and poet.

=== 14 ===
- Nick Dennis, 76, Greek-born American actor (Ben Casey, Kojak, A Streetcar Named Desire), myasthenia gravis and cancer.
- Maksim Gaspari, 97, Slovenian painter.
- Adolphe Graedel, 78, Swiss trade unionist.
- Beb Guérin, 38, French jazz musician.
- Jeanne Halbwachs, 90, French peace activist.
- Arnold Haskell, 77, British dance critic.
- Johnny Horan, 47, American basketball player, complications from surgery.
- Ralph Hubbard, 94, American novelist and cultural preservationist.
- C. Gardner Mallonee, 77, American football and lacrosse player, coach and Olympian (1928).
- Takuro Shintani, 37, Japanese mathematician, suicide.
- Hunter P. Wharton, 80, American trade unionist.

=== 15 ===
- Joan Fleming, 72, British novelist.
- Harri Larva, 74, Finnish Olympic runner (1928, 1932).
- Richard Law, 1st Baron Coleraine, 79, British politician, MP (1931–1954).
- Bill Lee, 64, American singer (The Mellomen) and voice actor (The Jungle Book), brain cancer.
- Bob Mathouser, 54, American racing driver.
- Henry Muller, 78, French writer and journalist.
- Emilio Pujol, 94, Spanish guitarist and composer.
- Theodore Saloutos, 70, American historian.

=== 16 ===
- Boris Aronson, 82, Russian-American set designer.
- Nikolaus Biewer, 58, German footballer.
- Frank Billham, 84, Guyanese-born British cricketer.
- John Cade, 68, Australian psychologist, esophageal cancer.
- Don Crabtree, 68, American experimental archaeologist.
- Ben Doig, 76, Australian politician.
- Wolfgang Feger, 42, Liechtensteiner politician, cancer.
- Imogen Hassall, 38, English actress, suicide by drug overdose.
- Jayan, 41, Indian actor and stuntman, helicopter crash.
- Frank Luther, 81, American country musician.
- Hélène Rytmann, 70, French sociologist, strangled.
- J. R. Temple, 80, American politician, mayor of Dallas (1947–1949).
- O. V. Wright, 41, American singer ("That's How Strong My Love Is"), heart attack.

=== 17 ===
- Jean Ballantyne, 74, New Zealand ballet teacher and choreographer.
- Eppie Barnes, 79, American baseball player and executive.
- Alec Bright, 82, American Olympic skier (1936).
- Ern Elliott, 80, Australian footballer.
- Robert W. Hayler, 89, American naval admiral, pneumonia.
- David Marr, 35, British physiologist and computer scientist, leukemia.
- Hersh Martin, 71, American baseball player and scout.
- Benjamin A. Rogge, 60, American economist.
- Paul Smith, 74, American animator.
- S. Venkataraman, 77, Indian politician, MP (1952–1962).
- Henri-Robert von der Mühll, 82, Swiss architect.
- Hans Wetterström, 56, Swedish Olympic canoeist (1948, 1952, 1956).

=== 18 ===
- Arthur S. Adams, 84, American academic administrator.
- Richard Carline, 84, British artist.
- R. A. de Castro Basto, 82, Macanese physisican.
- John Fischetti, 64, American cartoonist, heart attack.
- Forbes Hendry, 72, Scottish politician, MP (1959–1966).
- Conn Smythe, 85, Canadian ice hockey executive, heart attack.
- František Šorm, 67, Czech chemist, heart attack.
- Knut Toven, 83, Norwegian politician.

=== 19 ===
- Margaret Aitken, 74, Canadian politician and writer, MP (1953–1962).
- E. J. Bowen, 82, British chemist.
- Laurie Cumming, 75, Irish footballer.
- Hazel Forbes, 69, American dancer and actress.
- Jack Gilligan, 95, American baseball player.
- Vera Brown Holmes, 90, Canadian-American historian.
- Norman Judd, 76, Irish Olympic water polo player (1928).
- Dominador I. Mangubat, 77, Filipino politician and physician.
- Florence Crannell Means, 89, American author (The Moved-Outers).

=== 20 ===
- Alby Anderson, 86, Australian footballer.
- Hans von Boineburg-Lengsfeld, 91, German general.
- Arthur M. Brown, 96, American football and basketball coach.
- Sandro Calvesi, 67, Italian athletics coach.
- Ted Cremer, 61, American football player.
- Avtandil Gogoberidze, 58, Soviet Georgian footballer.
- Richard Hallock, 74, American historian.
- Sir John McEwen, 80, Australian politician, prime minister (1967–1968), starved.
- Philip Bernard Rynard, 83, Canadian politician and physician, MP (1957–1979).
- Eugenia Umińska, 70, Polish violinst.
- Jack Whitten, 58, Australian footballer.

=== 21 ===
- Tommy Armstrong, 78, New Zealand politician, MP (1943–1951).
- Sara García, 88, Mexican actress and comedian, heart attack.
- Terry Harris, 57, New Zealand water polo player.
- Fatafat Jayalaxmi, 22, Indian actress, suicide by hanging.
- Ronald B. Levinson, 84, American philosopher.
- Giulio Maculani, 60, Italian actor.
- Park Yong-rae, 55, South Korean poet.
- Jim Parks, 77, English cricketer.
- László Rédei, 80, Hungarian mathematician.
- Walter Rilla, 86, German actor.
- Louis-André Schaffner, 74, French racing cyclist.
- A. J. M. Smith, 78, Canadian poet.
- I. Valerian, 85, Romanian writer and journalist.

=== 22 ===
- Uffe Baadh, 57, Danish-born American jazz musician.
- Leonard Barr, 77, American actor (Diamonds Are Forever) and comedian, complications from a stroke.
- Morris Frank, 72, American disability activist (The Seeing Eye).
- General Echo, 24, Jamaican reggae musician, shot.
- Harry Halm, 79, German actor.
- Elizabeth Ellis Hoyt, 87, American economist.
- Marienetta Jirkowsky, 18, German woman, shot.
- Jules Léger, 67, Canadian politician, governor general (1974–1979), stroke.
- John W. McCormack, 88, American politician, member (1928–1971) and speaker of the U.S. House of Representatives (1962–1971), pneumonia.
- Norah McGuinness, 79, Irish painter.
- Ilmari Sormunen, 83, Finnish politician.
- Reggy Van De Putte, 65, British-born Belgian Olympic field hockey player (1936).
- Mae West, 87, American actress and playwright (Diamond Lil, Sex).

=== 23 ===
- Hannah Caroline Aase, 97, American botanist.
- R. Allatini, 90, Austrian-British novelist.
- Rodolfo Casanova, 65, Mexican boxer.
- Sangad Chaloryu, 64, Thai politician and naval admiral, acting prime minister (1976, 1977), heart attack.
- John Leahy, 39, Australian footballer.
- Karel Nový, 89, Czech writer and journalist.
- Ruth Buxton Sayre, 84, American agriculturalist.
- Oscar L. Shepard, 86, American politician, member of the Vermont House of Representatives (1937–1941).
- Ernest Taylor, 82, Australian footballer.
- Jean Templin, 51, French footballer.
- Herby Wade, 75, South African cricketer.

=== 24 ===
- George Aarons, 84, American sculptor.
- Herbert Agar, 83, American-British journalist and historian.
- Mahmoud Khalil Al-Hussary, 63, Egyptian qāriʾ, liver failure.
- Gabriel Casaccia, 73, Paraguayan novelist.
- Noel Duckworth, 67, British Olympic rower (1936) and Anglican priest.
- Marvin Farber, 78, American philosopher.
- Dick Haynes, 69, American actor, cancer.
- Nancy Hsueh, 39, American actress (Targets, Love Is a Many Splendored Thing), atherosclerosis.
- Jeanne Matthey, 94, French tennis player.
- Jeanne Provost, 92, French actress.
- George Raft, 79, American actor (Scarface) and tango dancer, emphysema.
- Molly Reilly, 58, Canadian pilot.
- Ivar Sahlin, 84, Swedish Olympic track and field athlete (1920, 1924).
- Saleh Suleiman, 91–92, Ottoman-born Israeli politician, MK (1955–1959).
- Henrietta Hill Swope, 78, American astronomer.
- Vivian Trías, 58, Uruguayan politician and historian.

=== 25 ===
- George Amsberg, 75, Australian jurist.
- Joe Cipriano, 49, American college basketball coach, cancer.
- Jacqueline Dalya, 62, American actress.
- Dorothy Elliott, 84, British trade unionist.
- Herbert Flam, 52, American tennis player.
- Art Jones, 74, American baseball player and politician.
- W. Albert Noyes Jr., 82, American chemist.
- Robert Pettiona, 65, Australian politician.
- Mary Winearls Porter, 94, English crystallographer and geologist.
- Sir Alan Scott-Moncrieff, 80, British naval admiral.
- Joseph Sweeney, 83, Irish politician and general.
- Konrad Wachsmann, 79, German architect.

=== 26 ===
- Castelhano, 88, Brazilian footballer.
- Ray Clemons, 68, American Olympic wrestler (1936) and football player.
- Kazimierz Dąbrowski, 78, Polish psychologist.
- Pete DePaolo, 82, American racing driver.
- Conrad A. Nervig, 91, American film editor (Eskimo, King Solomon's Mines, A Tale of Two Cities).
- Richard Oelze, 80, German painter.
- Rachel Roberts, 53, Welsh actress (This Sporting Life, Saturday Night and Sunday Morning, Maggie May), suicide by lye ingestion.
- Thomas Benton Slate, 99, American inventor and businessman, cancer.
- Ludomir Sleńdziński, 91, Polish painter.
- Giuseppe Soravia, 32, Italian Olympic bobsledder (1980), skull fracture.

=== 27 ===
- Enrique Álvarez Córdova, 50, Salvadoran politician, shot.
- Bill Connelly, 55, American baseball player.
- Ethel Grayson, 90, Canadian writer and educator.
- Ferenc Hepp, 71, Hungarian basketball executive.
- F. Burrall Hoffman, 98, American architect.
- Adekunle Lawal, 46, Nigerian politician and naval admiral.
- Derek Lister, 50, English cricketer.
- Willy Reiber, 85, German filmmaker.

=== 28 ===
- Jessie Baetz, 86, Canadian-American composer and artist.
- Keith Caldwell, 85, New Zealand flying ace.
- Bernard Fergusson, Baron Ballantrae, 69, British politician and military historian, governor-general of New Zealand (1962–1967), complications from a stroke.
- Carlo Franzinetti, 57, Italian physicist.
- Nachum Gutman, 82, Moldovan-born Israeli artist.
- Yitzchak Hutner, 74, Polish-American rabbi.
- Antony Lyttelton, 2nd Viscount Chandos, 60, British soldier and hereditary peer.
- Sarah Y. Mason, 84, American screenwriter.
- Mia May, 96, Austrian-American actress.
- Birendranath Sircar, 79, Indian film producer.
- Merton F. Utter, 63, American microbiologist.
- Alick Wyers, 72, English cricketer.

=== 29 ===
- Henry Billington, 72, British tennis player.
- Dorothy Day, 83, American journalist and social activist, heart attack.
- Bill Dunlap, 71, American baseball player.
- Edith Evanson, 84, American actress, heart failure.
- Ray Hanken, 68, American football player.
- Paul Randall Harrington, 69, American surgeon and implant designer (Harrington rod).
- Joel Hurstfield, 69, British historian.
- Isabel Ellie Knaggs, 87, British crystallographer.
- Babe London, 79, American actress and painter.
- George J. Maloof Sr., 57, American businessman.
- Charles McCann, 80, British-New Zealand naturalist.
- John Putnam, 63, American illustrator (Mad), pneumonia.
- Pierre Sauvestre, 65, French Olympic rower (1948).
- Tom Stobart, 66, British cameraman and filmmaker (The Conquest of Everest), heart attack.
- Lester Wynne, 72, Australian cricketer.

=== 30 ===
- Max Alpert, 81, Soviet photographer.
- Steve Andrako, 65, American football player.
- Ingrid Bjerkås, 79, Norwegian theologian and minister.
- Cartola, 72, Brazilian samba singer, composer and poet.
- Amedeo D'Albora, 84, Italian architect.
- Orhan Eyüpoğlu, 62, Turkish politician, heart attack.
- Mieko Fukui, 23, Japanese Olympic basketball player (1976).
- Bertrand Gille, 60, French historian and archivist.
- Carl Henry Hoffman, 84, American politician, member of the U.S. House of Representatives (1946–1947).
- Joyzelle Joyner, 75, American actress and dancer.
- Marion Charles Matthes, 74, American jurist.
- Merrill Mueller, 64, American journalist.
- Hugh Proudfoot, 68, Canadian politician, MP (1949–1958).
- Elizabeth Shoumatoff, 92, Russian-American portrait artist (Unfinished portrait of Franklin D. Roosevelt).
- Douglas Wilson, 77, British Anglican prelate.
- Kelton Winston, 41, American football player.

== Sources ==
- Backer, Roy (2012). Mystery Movie Series of 1930s Hollywood. Jefferson: McFarland. ISBN 9780786490189.
- Cullen, Frank; Hackman, Florence; McNeilly, Donald (2007). Vaudeville, Old & New: An Encyclopedia of Variety Performers in America. Routledge. ISBN 978-0-415-93853-2.
- Louvish, Simon (2006). Mae West: It Ain't No Sin. London: Macmillan. ISBN 978-0-571-21948-3.
- Watts, Jill (2003). Mae West: An Icon in Black and White. Oxford University Press US. ISBN 978-0-19-516112-0.
- Yablonsky, Lewis. George Raft. New York: McGraw-Hill Book Co., 1974. ISBN 0070722358.
