= Arthur Brown =

Arthur Brown may refer to:

== Entertainment ==
- Arthur William Brown (1881–1966), Canadian commercial artist
- H. Arthur Brown (1906–1992), American orchestral conductor
- Arthur Brown (musician) (born 1942), English rock singer
- Arthur Brown, aka Cluemaster, comic-book supervillain

== Football ==
- Arthur Brown (footballer, born 1858) (1858–1909), English international football for Aston Villa, 1870s–1880s
- Albert Brown (footballer, born 1862) (1862–1930), English footballer for Aston Villa, 1880s–1890s – brother of the above and sometimes misidentified as Arthur
- Arthur Brown (footballer, born 1885) (1885–1944), English international footballer for Sheffield United and Sunderland
- Arthur Brown (footballer, born 1888) (1888–?), English football goalkeeper for Portsmouth and Southampton
- Arthur Brown (footballer, born 1903) (1903–1971), Welsh international goalkeeper for Aberdare, Reading, and Crewe Alexandra
- Arthur Brown (rugby union) (born 1949), Scotland international rugby union player
- Arthur Brown (New Zealand footballer), New Zealand international footballer
- Arthur M. Brown (1884–1980), American college football coach
- Arthur Brown (American football) (born 1990), American football player
- Arthur Juan Brown (born 1997), American football player

== Military ==
- Arthur Tillotson Brown (1878–1942), last captain of the first RMS Mauretania
- Arthur Whitten Brown (1886–1948), Scottish aviator
- Roy Brown (RAF officer) (Arthur Roy Brown, 1893–1944), Canadian WWI fighter ace
- Arthur E. Brown Jr. (born 1929), U.S. Army general

== Politics ==
- Arthur Brown (American politician) (1843–1906), American senator from Utah
- Arthur Winton Brown (1856–1916), New Zealand politician
- Arthur Bruce Brown (1911–1975), Canadian politician in British Columbia
- Arthur J. Brown (1901–?), Toronto politician

== Other ==
- Arthur Brown (engineer) (1851–1935), City Engineer, Nottingham
- Arthur Lewis Brown (1854–1928), American federal judge
- Arthur Judson Brown (1856–1963), American minister and missionary
- Arthur Brown Jr. (1874–1957), American architect
- Arthur T. Brown (1900–1993), American architect
- Arthur Stanley Brown (1912–2002), Australian suspect in a 1970 rape and murder case
- Arthur Graham Brown (1919–1982), Australian amateur ornithologist
- Arthur Brown (bishop) (1926–2011), Canadian suffragan bishop
- Arthur Brown (economist) (1914–2003), English economist
- Arthur Brown, an alias of Nicholas Alahverdian (born 1987), American convicted sex offender who faked his death
- Arthur "Squirt" Brown Jr. (1970–2023), American murderer and perpetrator of the Brownstone Lane murders

== See also ==
- Arthur Browne (disambiguation)
- List of people with surname Brown
