= Fredell Lack =

American violinist (1922–2007)

- Born: February 19, 1922; Tulsa, Oklahoma, U.S.
- Died: August 20, 2017 (aged 95) Houston, Texas, U.S.
- Genre: Classical music
- Occupations: Musician, music teacher
- Instrument: Violin

Fredell Lack (February 19, 1922 – August 20, 2017) was an American violinist. Noted as a concert soloist, recording artist, chamber musician, and teacher, she was the C. W. Moores Distinguished Professor of Violin at the Moores School of Music at the University of Houston in Houston, Texas.

== Early life and musical training ==
Fredell Lack was born in Tulsa, Oklahoma, the oldest of three children of Jewish Eastern European (Latvian) immigrants, Abram I. Lack and Sarah Stillman Lack (who was a sister of noted painter Ary Stillman). She began violin lessons at age six, studying with Tosca Berger. When Fredell was ten, she moved with her family to Houston, Texas. There she studied with Josephine Boudreaux, the concertmaster of the Houston Symphony. At age 11, she first soloed with orchestra, performing the Wieniawski Concerto No. 2 with the Tulsa Philharmonic. At 12, Lack was accepted into the New York City studio of violinist and pedagogue Louis Persinger, whose other students included such artists as Yehudi Menuhin, Isaac Stern, and Ruggiero Ricci. She moved to New York and completed her pre-college schooling at the Bentley School while continuing her violin lessons with Persinger. At 17, she made her professional solo debut, playing the Mendelssohn Violin Concerto with the St. Louis Symphony Orchestra. Subsequently she received a full scholarship to the Juilliard School in New York. She continued studying violin with Persinger there and also was deeply influenced by her study of chamber music with Felix Salmond. She received the diploma from Juilliard at age 21.

== Career ==
Lack had a long-lasting career during which she made dozens of concert tours worldwide, including more than twenty to Europe alone. She soloed with the orchestras of New York, Pittsburgh, Stockholm, Houston, Baltimore, Rotterdam, San Antonio, Oslo, and Kansas City, and with the Concertgebouw of Amsterdam, the Royal Philharmonic, RIAS of Berlin, the BBC Symphony, the Hallé Orchestra, and others. With the RIAS Orchestra, Lack performed the European premieres of the Menotti Violin Concerto and the Bernstein Serenade. She also made a number of recordings (see "Selected discography" below).

Lack made her New York recital debut in 1943 at The Town Hall, performing concertos by Vivaldi and Dvořák, a sonata by Dohnányi, and pieces by Shostakovich, Poulenc, Ysaÿe, and Wieniawski. She commenced artistic study with Ivan Galamian, widely regarded among violinists as the greatest pedagogical influence of the latter half of the twentieth century. She performed frequently in master classes with the Romanian violinist George Enescu, and often traveled to Boston to play new works for the composition studio of Nadia Boulanger.

In 1947, Lack was selected to be the first concertmaster of the prestigious Little Orchestra Society of New York, a position she held for two seasons. That year, Lack began performing solos weekly that were broadcast to a national audience over the Mutual radio network. In 1951 she entered the Queen Elisabeth Music Competition in Brussels, Belgium. Despite the fact that both American finalists were given scores of 0 by the Soviet judge in the final round, Lack came away with a bronze medal and the Prize of Liège.

Also in 1951, Lack moved to Houston, Texas, where her husband had been offered a professorship. About a year later, she suffered what could have been a major setback to her career when a dog bit off the tip of the little finger of her left hand. However, following a year of focused rehabilitation and relearning of technique, she was able to continue performing.

Lack and three principal string players from the Houston Symphony formed the Lyric Art Quartet in 1955 and began several chamber music series around Houston. She began a highly successful Young Audiences program in Houston, which brings classical music to schoolchildren. In 1979, that organization gave to Lack its first in an annual series of awards, and the honor was thenceforth named the "Fredell Lack Award".

In 1959, Lack began teaching violin at the University of Houston, where she remained on the faculty for 50 years before retiring in 2009. She was the 1982–83 recipient of the Esther Farfel Award, given by colleagues to a single University of Houston faculty member each year. The Texas Music Teachers Association awarded her the Outstanding Teaching Achievement Award (Collegiate), a statewide distinction, in 1990. In 1997, the University of Houston Moores School of Music presented Lack with a Lifetime Achievement Award. In 2007, TexASTA, the Texas division of the American String Teachers Association, presented Lack with the Phyllis Young Outstanding Studio Teacher of the Year Award. Lack also maintained a private studio outside the school.

A great many of her students have gone on to musical careers as professional performers and teachers, and a number have become successful solo concert artists. One of Lack's former students, Frank Huang, is currently the concertmaster of the New York Philharmonic; he won the top prize at the highly prestigious Naumburg Competition in 2003, has performed as a soloist with major orchestras, and made a critically acclaimed recording debut on Naxos Records. Lack student Eden MacAdam-Somer is the co-chair of the New England Conservatory’s Contemporary Improvisation department and lead singer and violinist of the Klezmer Conservatory Band (KCB). Brett Deubner, David Mazzeo, Pálína Árnadóttir, Joyce Hammann, Mariko Inaba, Anabel Ramirez, Gloria Justen, Sharman Plesner, William Pu, Gregory Ewer, Beverly Shin, Maurice Sklar, Martin Valdeschack, Chuong Vu, and Zuo Jun are among other Lack students who have had successful concert careers. Lack also taught numerous sessions at the Meadowmount School of Music, an annual summer program in Upstate New York that was founded and for many years was directed by Lack's former mentor Ivan Galamian.

During her performing career, Lack played the "Baron Deurbroucq" violin, made in 1727 by Antonio Stradivari. Her bow was crafted by François Tourte. The violin's current official owner is listed as an anonymous private collector. However, the instrument is actively played by the renowned Dutch violinist Janine Jansen, who uses it on loan from Beare's International Violin Society.

== Personal ==
Lack was married to Ralph Eichhorn, a gastroenterologist, from 1947 until his death in 2014. She did not use her married name, Eichhorn, professionally. Lack had a daughter, a son, and several grandchildren. She was an active advocate for animal welfare.

She died in Houston on August 20, 2017, aged 95.

== Selected discography ==
- Prokofiev: Violin Concerto No. 2 in G minor. RCA MARH 2314. (1940s?)
- Violin Sonatas by Copland and Hindemith. With Leonid Hambro, piano. Allegro AL 33; reissued as Allegro LEG 9001. (1950)
- Sonatas by Tartini and Corelli. With Fernando Valenti, harpsichord. Allegro AL 94. (1950)
- Schubert: Sonata in A major. With Leonid Hambro, piano. Allegro AL 22; Allegro Elite 4042. (1951)
- Mendelssohn: Violin Concerto in E minor, Op. 64. With the New York Philharmonic (billed as the Stadium Symphony Orchestra). Music Appreciation MAR 92; reissued as World Record Club T-5 (1953? [original release])
- Jacobi: Ballade for Violin and Piano; String Quartet No. 3. With Irene Jacobi, piano, and Lyric Art Quartet. CRI 146; remastered and re-released on CRI CD703. (1961; re-release 1995)
- Violin Concertos by Shostakovich and Szymanowski. With the Berlin Symphony Orchestra. Vox Cum Laude D-VCL 9008 and VCS 9008; also MMG MCD 10013. (recorded 1980; released 1981)
- Szymanowski: Concerto No. 2 and Sonata, Op. 9. With Berlin Symphony Orchestra and Albert Hirsh, piano. Vox Cum Laude VCL-9061; VCS-9061. (recorded 1980, 1982; released 1984)
- Sonatas for Violin and Piano by Corigliano, Diamond, Lees, and Mennin. With Albert Hirsh, piano, and Barry Snyder, piano. Bay Cities CD BCD 1018. (1990)
- Martinů: The Violin Sonatas. With Timothy Hester, piano, and Leon Spierer, violin. Centaur CRC 2276. (recorded 1993; released 1996)
- Horvit: "Aleinu"; Fantasy ("The Daughters of Jerusalem") for Violin and Orchestra. With University of Houston Moores School of Music Chorale and Symphony Orchestra. Albany Troy 265 CD. (1997). The Fantasy was dedicated to Lack, who premiered the work in 1996.
