= Šorm =

Šorm is a Czech surname. Notable people with the name include:

- František Šorm (1913–1980), Czech chemist known for synthesis of natural compounds
- Josef Šorm (1932–2022), Czech volleyball player
- Patrik Šorm (born 1993), Czech sprinter specialising in the 400 metres

== See also ==
- 3993 Šorm, a main-belt asteroid named after František Šorm
- SORM
