= Antonio Paolucci =

Italian art historian and curator (1939–2024)

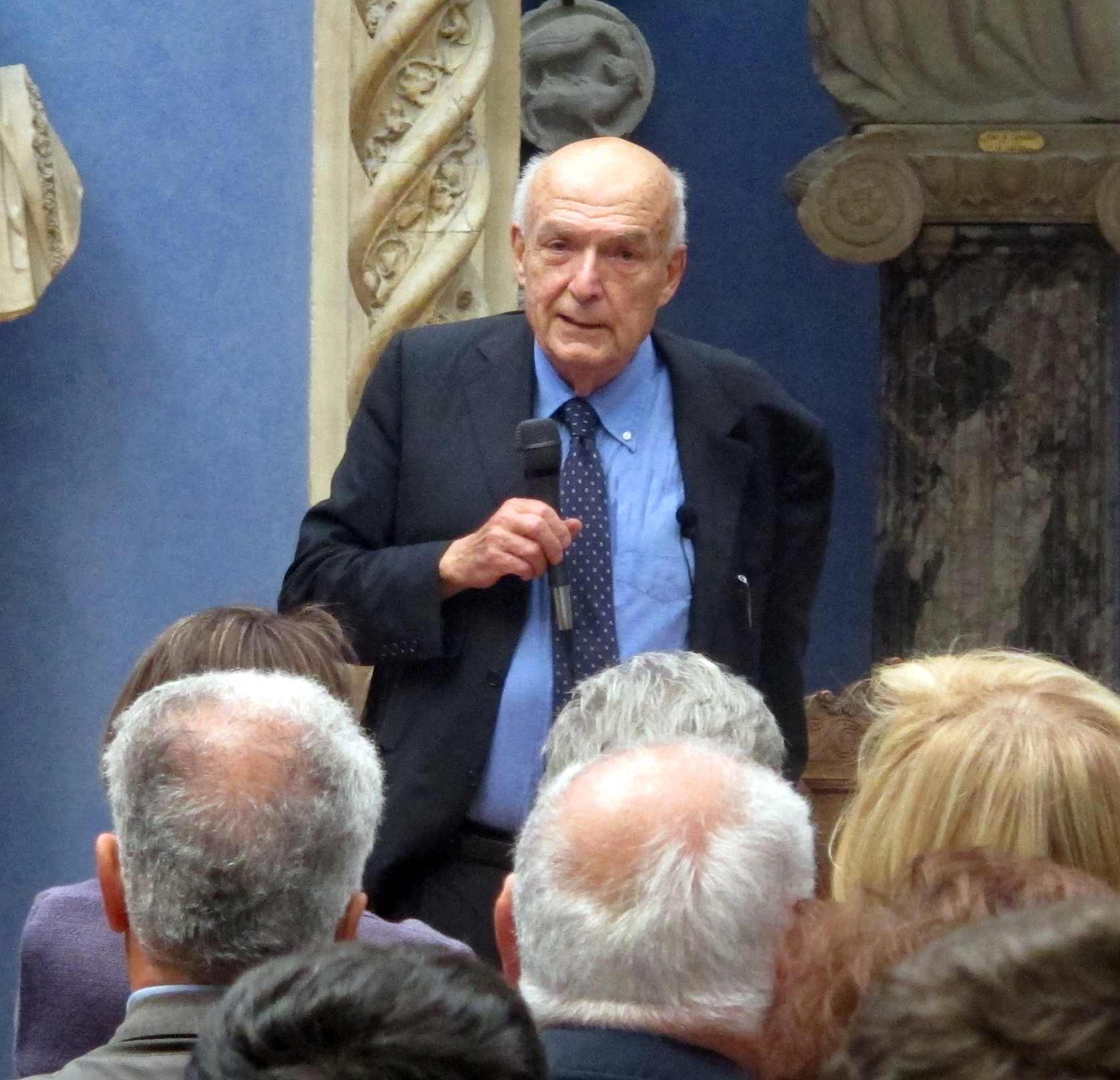
Paolucci in 2013

Antonio Paolucci (19 September 1939 – 4 February 2024) was an Italian art historian and curator, who was Director of the Vatican Museums between 2007 and 2017. Paolucci also worked in Florence, Venice, Verona, Mantua, and other Italian cities in national art and cultural institutions. He wrote many books and articles on art history and made television appearances on a variety of programs to explain and promote art. He was the recipient of numerous awards for his work.

== Early life ==
Antonio Paolucci was born in Rimini on 19 September 1939. His father was an antiques dealer, and Paolucci's passion for art began through his handling of antique objects found in his father's shop. He studied art history in Florence under Roberto Longhi and graduated in 1964. In 1963, before graduating, he began teaching art history to middle school students in Signa. This experience had a marked effect on his future, as he learned how to capture his students' attention and confirmed for him that complex ideas and concepts could be explained in accessible terms. He also taught at other institutions including the University of Florence and the University of Siena.

== Professional career ==
Paolucci's first job as a supervisor was in 1968 at the National Museum of Bargello in Florence. He began working for the Soprintendenza per i Beni Culturali for Venice in 1969 and continued there until 1980. After working for the Mantova-Brescia-Cremona region from 1984 to 1986, he moved to the Department of Artistic Affairs of Tuscany in 1988. Prior to becoming director of the Vatican Museums, Paolucci was, for nearly twenty years, the superintendent of the Polo Museale Fiorentino as well as the director general for cultural heritage in Tuscany. His responsibilities included overseeing sites in Florence such as the Uffizi Gallery, the Pitti Palace, the Boboli Gardens, and the Workshop of Precious Stones (for which he was the director from 1986 to 1988), along with many other sites of significant artistic heritage. He also held the position of Minister of Cultural Heritage from January 1995 to May 1996 under the technical government of Lamberto Dini. Paolucci was appointed the extraordinary commissioner for the restoration of the Basilica of Saint Francis of Assisi after the earthquake that struck on 26 September 1997 caused considerable damage to the patrimony of the basilica.

Pope Benedict XVI appointed Paolucci Director of the Vatican Museums in 2007. His tenure was marked by an increase in visitors from about 4.3 million in 2007 to over 6m in 2015 (and well over 6 million in 2016, according to Barbara Jatta, the vice director). In order to counteract the potential damage to the frescoes that large crowds and the high levels of CO_{2}, dust and perspiration they bring, Paolucci upgraded the climate control system in the Sistine Chapel in 2014, replacing the original air conditioning system installed in 1993 which was designed to manage up to 700 visitors at a time (while presently up to 2000 visitors at a time are allowed in). At the same time, a new lighting system was put in place using about 7000 LEDs to better illuminate the entire chapel at a lower cost. Also under Paolucci's direction visiting hours of the museums were extended into the evenings, and an online system was launched for the public to make their reservations. Paolucci retired from the Vatican Museums in 2017, and was succeeded by Jatta.

== Major works published ==
Paolucci published numerous monographs and books including works on: Piero della Francesca, Luca Signorelli, Antoniazzo Romano, Michelangelo, Filippo Lippi, Bronzino, Cellini, Giambologna, and the Sistine Chapel, as well as other works on restoration techniques and art history in general. His works have been translated into English, German, French, Spanish, Japanese, as well as other languages.

== Personal life and death ==
Paolucci and his wife, Giulia, also an art historian, were married from 1966 and had one son, Fabrizio.

Antonio Paolucci died in Florence on 4 February 2024, at the age of 84.
