= Hôtel Drouot =

Auction venue in Paris, France

Coordinates: 48°52′24″N 2°20′24.3″E

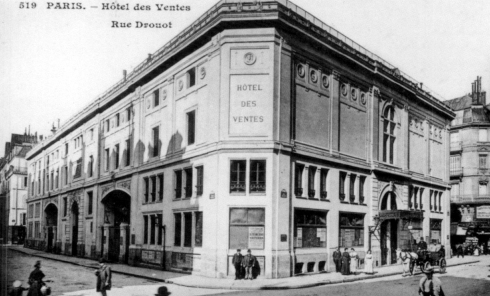
Hôtel Drouot in 1852

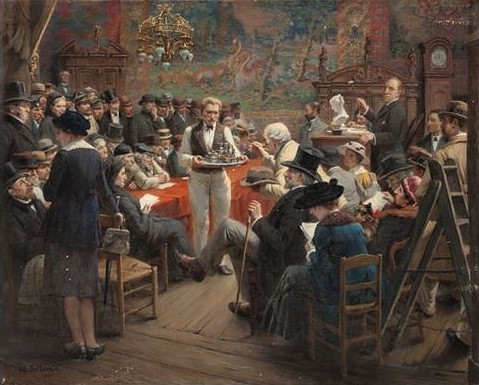
An Auction at the Hôtel Drouot by Albert Bettannier

Hôtel Drouot (English: /druːˈoʊ/ droo-OH, French: [otɛl dʁuo]) is a large auction venue in Paris, known for fine art, antiques, and antiquities. It consists of 16 halls hosting 70 independent auction firms, which operate under the umbrella grouping of Drouot.

The firm's main location, called Drouot-Richelieu, is situated on the Rue Drouot in the 9th arrondissement of Paris, on a site once occupied by the Paris Opera's Salle Le Peletier. The nearest Métro station is Richelieu–Drouot.

Other locations used to exist: Drouot-Montaigne, Drouot-Montmartre, and Drouot-Véhicules.

Details of forthcoming auctions are published in the weekly Gazette de l'Hôtel Drouot, sold at newsstands and by subscription.

In 2008 Hôtel Drouot was ranked fifth by sales amongst Paris auction houses, after Sotheby's, Christie's, Artcurial, and Ader-Picard-Tajan.

== History ==
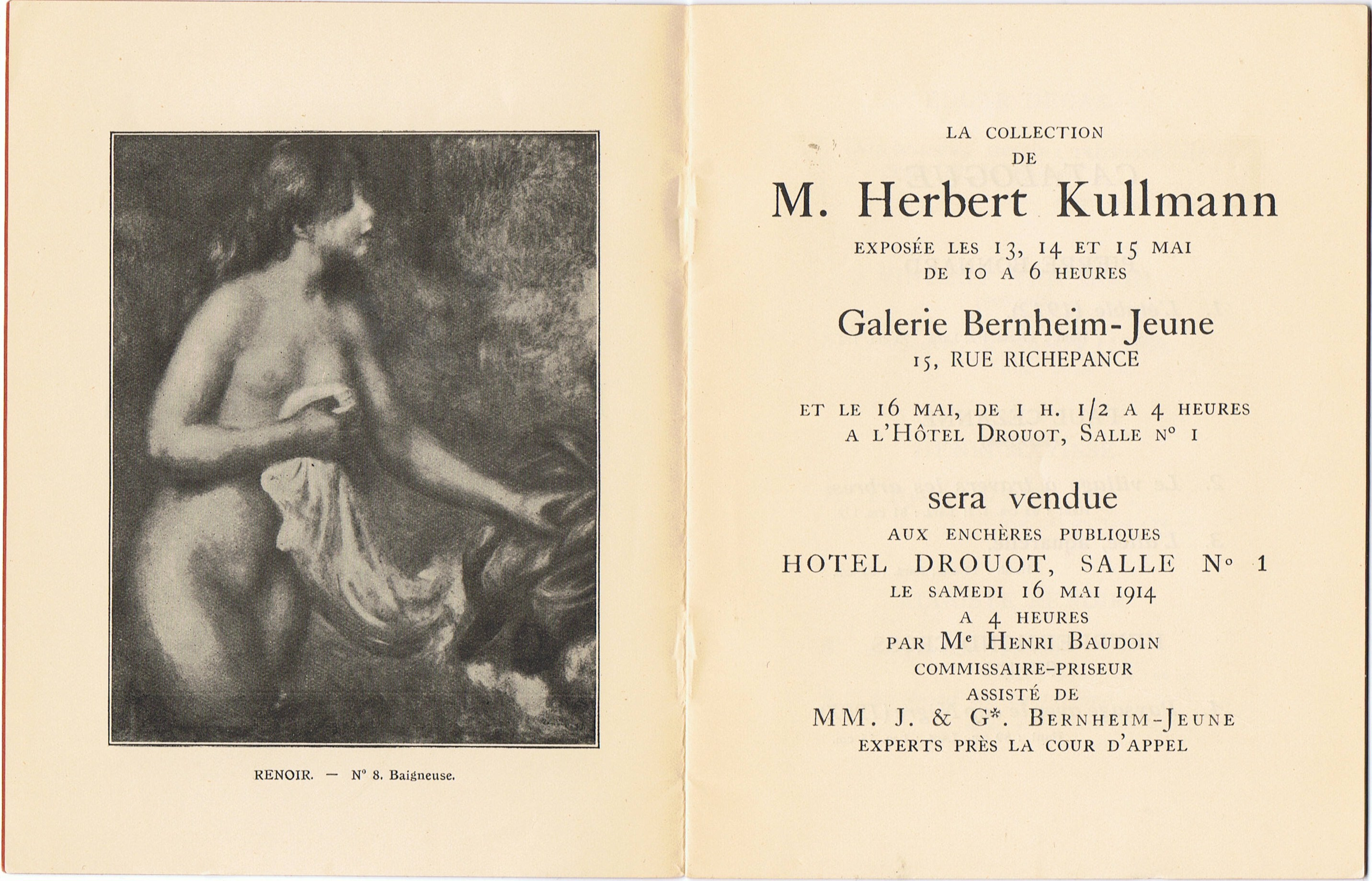
Frontispiece for a significant auction held at Drouot in May 1914, showing lot 8, Auguste Renoir, Baigneuse, 1895, 80 × 65 cm, similar to Baigneuse aux cheveux longs, Musée de l'Orangerie, Paris

The Hôtel Drouot was inaugurated on 1 June 1852.

During World War II and the German occupation of France, a large number of artworks from collections that had been owned by Jews passed through Drouot, which was as a result included on the Art Looting Investigation Unit list of Red Flag names.

From 1976 to 1980, while its present building was being constructed, sales took place in the former Gare d'Orsay. In 2000, reform of the monopolistic French auction laws, regulated through the system of commissaires-priseurs, opened Drouot up to international competition.

Hundreds of sacred relics were sold at the Hôtel Drouot auctions. Those being sold include Native American, Eskimo and pre-Columbian artefacts. Despite the pleas of the United States embassy, urging a stop to the 2014 sale of items cherished by the Navajo and Hopi people, the items were sold at auction. The Navajo Nation was able to buy back only seven of the possibly 270 items that were being sold.

== See also ==
Alphonse Bellier
