= Tosca Kramer =

New Zealand violist (1903–1976)

Tosca Berger Kramer (June 17, 1903 – December 27, 1976) was a New Zealand-born American violinist and violist. Kramer, along with her parents, was instrumental in bringing classical music performance and instruction to the state of Oklahoma.

Tosca Berger was the daughter of Kurt and Lucy Berger. Her father was an eminent conductor and her mother an Impressionist painter. As a youth Tosca studied violin with Willy Hess and Eugène Ysaÿe, earning a Diploma from the Royal Conservatory at Sondershausen in Thuringia, Germany. The young New Zealander quickly established herself as a solo concert artist. In the 1920s a U.S. tour by Berger, who was traveling with her parents, was suspended when Kurt Berger fell ill in Tulsa, Oklahoma. During the time of his recuperation, Tulsa city leaders succeeded in persuading the Bergers to settle there. With the encouragement and cooperation of the enterprising Oklahomans, the Berger family established the Tulsa Philharmonic, the city's first symphony orchestra, and Tosca became a highly respected teacher of violin and viola, known for traveling statewide to give lessons. Among many noted musicians to come from her studio is Fredell Lack, one of the leading violin virtuosi and teachers of her generation.

Tosca married Adolph Kramer, a violinist and string-instrument maker, and the couple adopted four children. Throughout her adult life, Tosca Kramer continued to be a major force in Oklahoma's musical, cultural, and educational communities, performing as principal (first-chair) violist of the Oklahoma City Symphony and Tulsa Philharmonic, playing benefit concerts for her church, All Souls Unitarian Church (Tulsa, Oklahoma), and playing solo and chamber music recitals on violin, viola, and viola d'amore, and serving on the music faculties of the University of Tulsa, Oklahoma City University, the University of Oklahoma, and University of North Texas College of Music. In her 60s, already a distinguished artist and pedagogue, Kramer returned to school and earned both Master of Music and Doctor of Musical Arts degrees from the Eastman School of Music. She has been described as "perhaps in the history of Tulsa its most outstanding musician."

Tosca Kramer died in Tulsa, Oklahoma, at age 73.

== Discography ==
Includes:

- Music Of Andrea And Giovanni Gabrieli, with the Eastman Wind Ensemble. Mercury Living Presence Series SR-90245 / MG-50245. (1961)

== Sources ==
- Hill, Regina L. For My Children, Your Ancestors
- Mercury Records Collection
- "NTSU Faculty Adds Kramer". Dallas Morning News, 16 October 1971.
- Rooney, Dennis. "Texas Heart". The Strad, January 1990.
- Social Security Death Index
- "Concert Artists." Tulsa Tribune, 30 March 1957.
