= Barbara Jatta =

Italian art historian (born 1962)

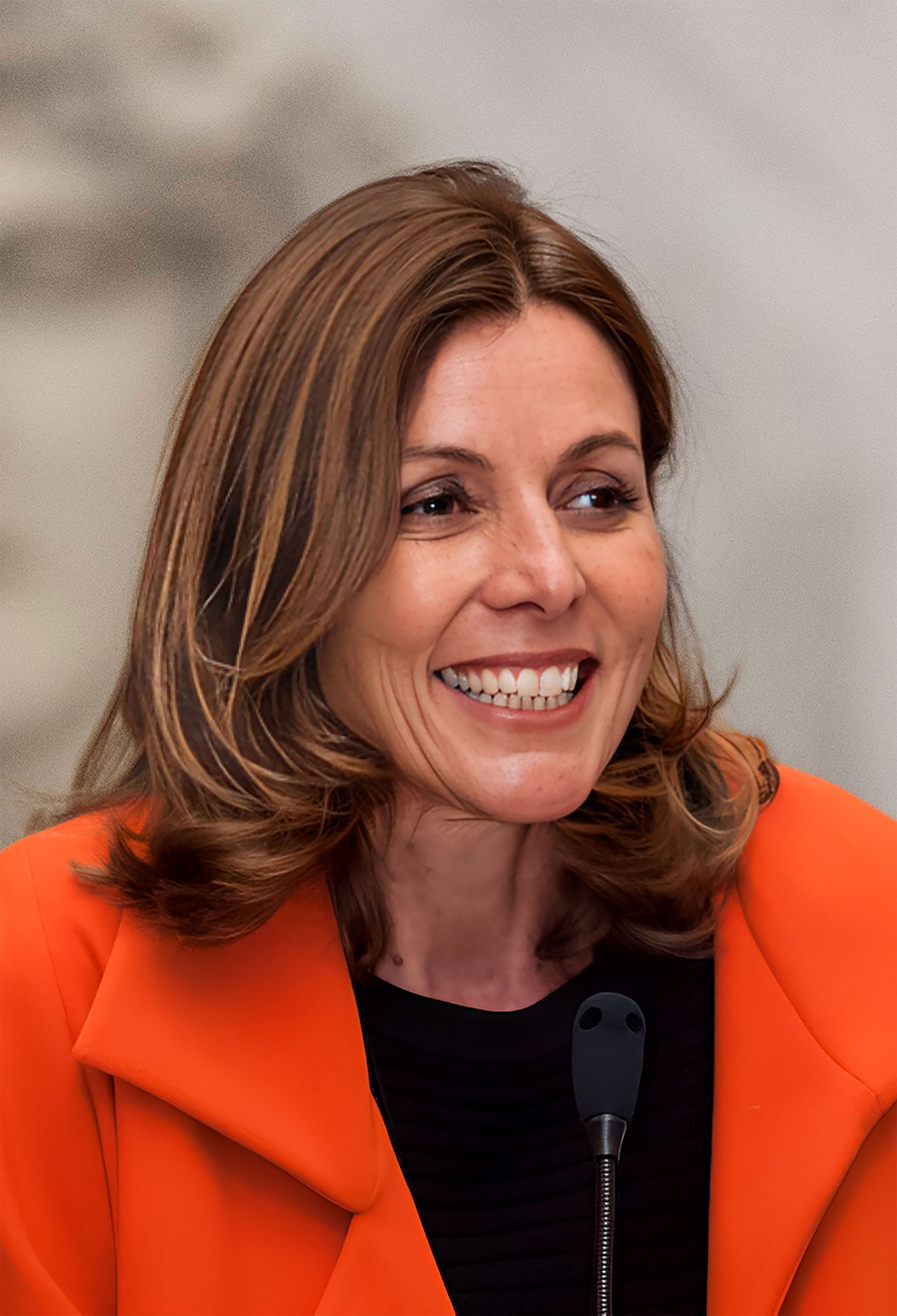
- The Director of the Vatican Museums Barbara Jatta
- Born: 6 October 1962 (age 64)

Academic background
- Education: Sapienza University of Rome

Academic work
- Discipline: Art history
- Institutions: Vatican Library; Suor Orsola Benincasa University of Naples; Vatican Museum

Barbara Jatta (born 6 October 1962) is an Italian art historian who has been the director of the Vatican Museums since June 2016.

== Early life and education ==
Jatta has joked that she was born among the smell of solvents. Her mother was a painter and conservator, and her sister a conservator.

She often visited her grandparents on Via Giulia in Rome, or at Fregene on the outskirts of the city, where her grandmother, Assia Busiri Vici, a portrait painter, would paint her. Her grandfather Andrea was an architect. She has studied conservation at Istituto centrale per la patologia del libro, today Istituto centrale per il restauro e la conservazione del patrimonio archivistico e librario. Despite her family background, she only determined on a career in art history when she was living in an artists commune in Rome and went with one of the artists to an art history lesson.

She studied literature at the University of Rome (Università degli Studi di Roma "La Sapienza"), completing her thesis, The History of Drawing, Engraving and Graphics, in 1986. She later went on to earn degrees in Archive Administration and Art History. After her studies in Italy, she studied in England, Portugal, and the United States. Since 1994 she has taught at the Suor Orsola Benincasa University in Naples.

== Vatican career ==
In 1996 she joined and led the prints section of the Vatican Library. She became the vice-director of the Vatican Museums under Antonio Paolucci in June 2016. On 20 December 2016, Pope Francis appointed her the director of the Vatican Museums, effective 1 January 2017. Jatta became the first female director of the Vatican Museums. She is responsible for artworks that includes the iconic ceiling of the Sistine Chapel. The Vatican museums earns more than $300m with profits of $40m from visitors to their museums. Jatta has recognised the work done by her predecessors. She says that she will eliminate the unsightly queue of visitors who stand to await entry. She will encourage visitors to enjoy the lesser known sections of the museum which should reduce crowding of the Sistine Chapel. She planned to utilize the "new media" to both publicize and educate. All this must be done, she said, while "paying special attention to the 'Vatican tradition'." In March 2017, Jatta presided over the opening of a show at the Vatican Museums for the first time: Dilectissimo fratri Caesario Symmachus». From Arles to Rome, the relics of St. Caesarius, treasure of Paleo-Christian Gaul.

In March 2018, Jatta attended meetings in Rome that marked the UN's International Day of Women and she represented the Vatican at a conference sponsored by the United Nations Commission on the Status of Women (CSW), the first time the Vatican had participated in a meeting sponsored by the CSW.

== Personal life ==
Since 1988 Jatta has been married to Fabio Midulla, a medical educator; they have three children.
