= Arthur Browne =

Arthur Browne may refer to:

- Arthur Browne (1732–1779), Irish politician, MP for Gowran 1769–76, County Mayo 1776–79
- Arthur Browne (1756–1805), Irish politician, MP for Dublin University 1783–1800
- Arthur Browne (bishop) (1864–1951), Anglican priest, Bishop of Bermuda 1925–48
- Arthur Browne, 8th Marquess of Sligo (1867–1951), Irish soldier and peer, known as Lord Arthur Browne (1903 to 1941)
- Arthur Browne, recently retired editor and publisher of the New York Daily News
- Ted Browne (c. 1914 – 2002), American college football coach and athletics administrator

== See also ==
- Arthur Brown (disambiguation)
- Browne (surname)
