= Mauro Olivieri =

Italian electronic engineer

Mauro Olivieri is a professor of electronics at Sapienza University of Rome, Italy.

Grown up in Genoa, Italy, Olivieri received his Master (Laurea) degree in electronics engineering and his Doctorate degree in electronics and computer engineering from the University of Genoa, where he was also assistant professor from 1995 to 1998. In 1998 he joined Sapienza University, where he is responsible for the Digital System Lab and holds the chairs of Digital Electronics and Digital Integrated System Architectures. Since 2018 he has been a visiting researcher at the Barcelona Supercomputing Center, Spain, within the European Processor Initiative project. Olivieri served as a project evaluator for the European Commission in the ECSEL Joint Undertaking, and as a technical expert for the Italian Economic Development Ministry on the topic "Smart Cities/Communities". He is a senior member of the IEEE.
