= Helmut Winkler =

Helmut Gustav Franz Winkler (3 April 1915 – 10 November 1980) was a German geologist who worked on experimental approaches to petrology, making use of high-pressure and temperature to examine metamorphic processes. The mineral Helmutwinklerite is named in his honour.

Winkler was born in Kiel and studied geology at the University of Rostock, receiving a doctorate in 1938 for work on thixotropy of minerals. A major influence was C. W. Correns. He served in World War II and returned to Rostock in 1945. In 1949 he became a director of the crystallography institute at the University of Göttingen with some work at the University of Marburg before returning in 1962 to Göttingen where he worked until his retirement in 1976. He suggested that granites were formed from metamorphic parent rocks and are therefore common in cratons.
