= Jack Whitten (footballer) =

Australian rules footballer

Personal information
- Full name: Jack Whitten
- Born: 25 January 1922; Geelong, Victoria
- Died: 20 November 1980 (aged 58)
- Original team: Newtown
- Height: 173 cm (5 ft 8 in)
- Weight: 70 kg (154 lb)

Playing career^{1}
Years	Club	Games (Goals)
1946–48	Geelong	17 (17)
- ^{1} Playing statistics correct to the end of 1948.

Jack Whitten (25 January 1922 – 20 November 1980) was an Australian rules footballer who played with Geelong in the Victorian Football League (VFL).
