= Louis-André Schaffner =

French cyclist (1906–1980)

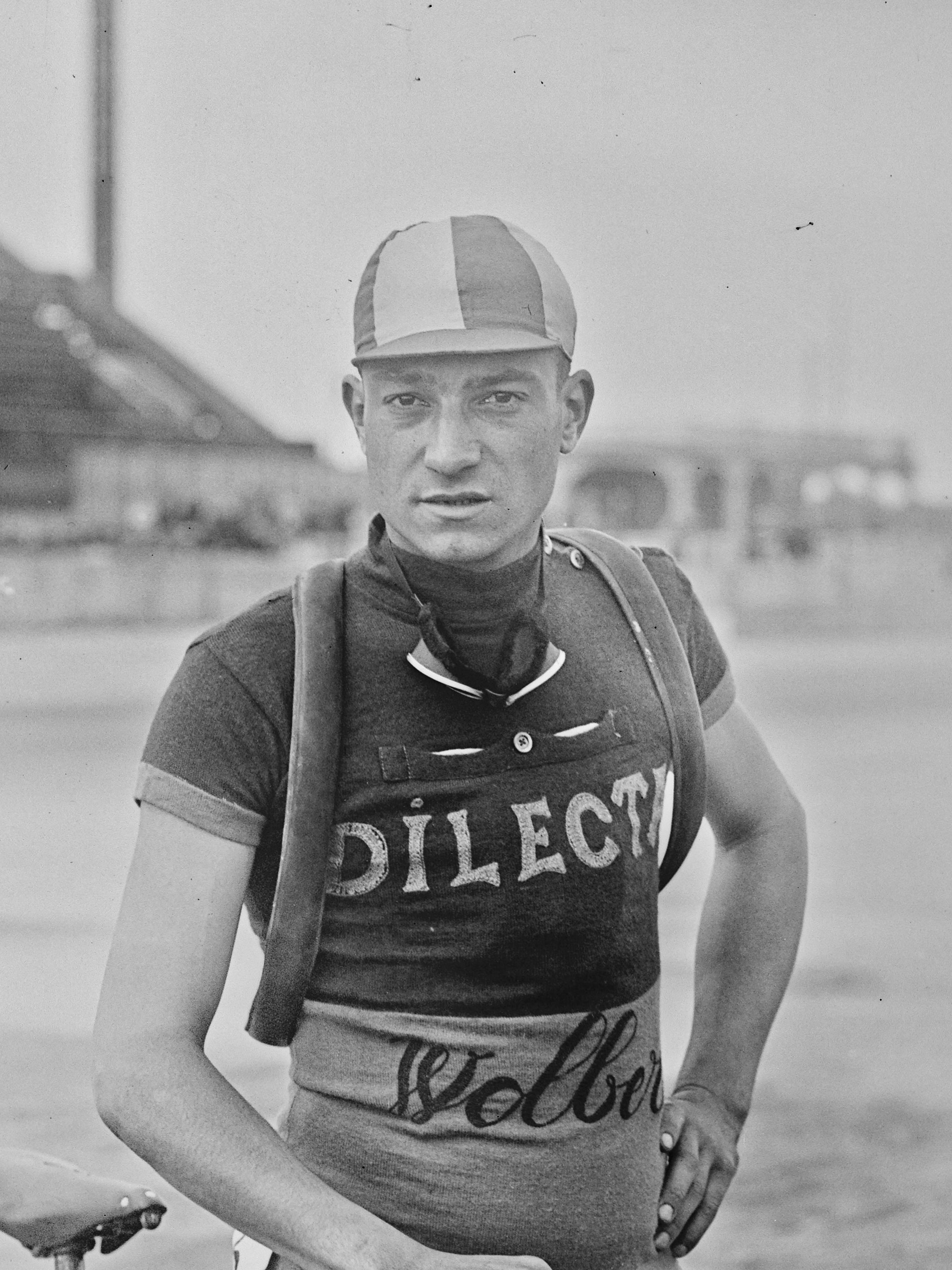

Personal information
- Born: 4 April 1906
- Died: 21 November 1980 (aged 74)

Cycling career
- Sport: Cycling
- Discipline: Road
- Role: Rider

Louis-André Schaffner (4 April 1906 – 21 November 1980) was a French racing cyclist. He rode in the 1927 Tour de France.
