= Arthur Brown (economist) =

English economist

Arthur Joseph Brown, CBE, FBA (8 August 1914 – 28 February 2003) was an English economist who was Professor of Economics at the University of Leeds.

== Early life and education ==
Though born in Alderley in Cheshire on 8 August 1914, Brown was raised in Yorkshire where he attended Bradford Grammar School. He studied PPE at The Queen's College, Oxford, graduating with first-class honours in 1936.

== Academic career ==
In 1937 Brown was elected a fellow of All Souls College, Oxford (beating Harold Wilson in the competition for the place) and was also appointed a lecturer at Hertford College, Oxford. He established a reputation as an economist and embraced Keynesianism. He remained at All Souls until 1946, but left his lectureship in 1940 when (during the Second World War) he joined the Foreign Research and Press Service, transferring in 1943 to the Foreign Office Research Department and then finally (in 1945) to the Economic Section of the Cabinet Office. During this period, he wrote articles on applied economics for the Bulletin of International News.

Brown left government service in 1947 to become Professor of Economics at the University of Leeds, where he remained until his retirement in 1979. During that period, he served as head of the university's Department of Economics and Commerce until 1965 and as pro-vice-chancellor from 1975 to 1977. He was made an emeritus professor on his retirement.

Brown wrote Applied Economics: Aspects of the World Economy in War and Peace (1948), The Great Inflation, 1939–1951 (1955), The Framework Of Regional Economics In The United Kingdom (1972) and World Inflation Since 1950: An International Comparative Study (with Jane Darby, 1985). He also advised African governments during decolonisation, represented the UK on the United Nations's Consultative Group on the Economic and Social Consequences of Disarmament and produced a study on regional economics for the UK government for which he calculated the multiplier used to officially estimate the impact of government spending on a region's income.

== Honours ==
Brown was elected a Fellow of the British Academy (FBA) in 1972, appointed a Commander of the Order of the British Empire (CBE) in 1974 and served as president of the Royal Economic Society from 1976 to 1978. He received honorary degrees from the Universities of Bradford, Kent, Aberdeen and Sheffield and was made an honorary fellow of The Queen's College, Oxford in 1985.

== Death ==
Brown died on 28 February 2003, aged 88.
