= Lester Wynne =

Australian cricketer (1908–1980)

Personal information
- Born: 7 October 1908; Melbourne, Australia
- Died: 29 November 1980 (aged 72); Melbourne, Australia

Domestic team information
- Years: Team
- 1935-1936: Victoria
- Source: Cricinfo, 22 November 2015

Lester Wynne (7 October 1908 – 29 November 1980) was an Australian cricketer. He played two first-class cricket matches for Victoria between 1935 and 1936.

== See also ==
- List of Victoria first-class cricketers
