= Cecil Jenkinson =

English cricketer

Personal information
- Full name: Cecil Victor Jenkinson
- Born: 15 May 1891; Ilford, Essex, England
- Died: 6 November 1980 (aged 89); Pembury, Kent, England
- Batting: Right-handed
- Role: Wicketkeeper

Domestic team information
- Years: Team
- 1922–1923: Essex

Career statistics
Competition	FC
Matches	5
Runs scored	9
Batting average	2.25
100s/50s	–/–
Top score	8
Balls bowled	–
Wickets	–
Bowling average	–
5 wickets in innings	–
10 wickets in match	–
Best bowling	–
Catches/stumpings	4/4
- Source: Cricinfo, 2 December 2010

Cecil Victor Jenkinson (15 May 1891 – 6 November 1980) was an English cricketer. Jenkinson was a right-handed batsman played primarily as a wicketkeeper. He was born at Ilford, Essex.

Jenkinson made his first-class debut for Essex in the 1922 County Championship against Hampshire at the United Services Recreation Ground, Portsmouth. From 1922 to 1923, he represented the county in 5 first-class matches, the last of which came against Middlesex. In his 5 first-class matches, he scored 9 runs at a batting average of 2.25, with a high score of 8. Behind the stumps he took 4 catches and made 4 stumpings.

He died at Pembury, Kent, on 6 November 1980.
