= Arthur Brown (New Zealand footballer) =

New Zealand footballer

Personal information
- Full name: Arthur G Brown
- Place of birth: New Zealand
- Height: 1.88 m (6 ft 2 in)
- Position: Striker

Senior career*
Years	Team	Apps	(Gls)
- Miramar Rangers

International career
1981	New Zealand	1	(0)
- * Club domestic league appearances and goals

Arthur Brown is a former association football player who represented New Zealand at international level.

Brown made a solitary official international appearance for New Zealand as a substitute in a 0–1 loss to United Arab Emirates on 10 September 1981.
