= Ted Davey =

Australian rules footballer

Personal information
- Full name: Edward James Davey
- Born: 29 August 1897; Richmond, Victoria
- Died: 6 November 1980 (aged 83); Lilydale, Victoria

Playing career^{1}
Years	Club	Games (Goals)
1917	Richmond	4 (1)
- ^{1} Playing statistics correct to the end of 1917.

Edward James Davey (29 August 1897 – 6 November 1980) was an Australian rules footballer who played with Richmond in the Victorian Football League (VFL).
