= Alphonse Bellier =

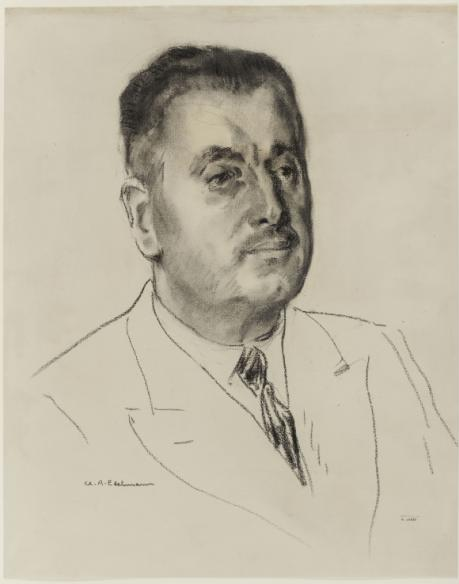
Alphonse Bellier, by Charles-Auguste Edelmann (Musée Carnavalet)

Alphonse Bellier (21 July 1886 – 1 November 1980) was a French auctioneer specializing in the sale of art collections.

== Biography ==
The son of a hatter from Saint-Nazaire, Alphonse Louis Marie Bellier came to Paris in 1918 and began his career as a notary, before becoming an auctioneer on 27 March 1920. In Paris, he held office No. 66 of the Chambre des commissaires-priseurs judiciaires de la Seine until 7 November 1958. His main place of work was the Hôtel Drouot, where he played a leading part in establishing sales of modern and contemporary art, then known as art vivant. He worked with experts such as Jos Hessel, André Schoeller (1879–1955), Jacques Mathey and Robert Lebel for sales of paintings and drawings, and with Charles Ratton for the 1931 sale of André Breton and Paul Éluard's collection of African, American and Oceanic sculpture; he was in contact with private collectors and museum institutions. Between 1921 and 1923 he conducted the court-ordered sales of the stock of the dealer Daniel-Henry Kahnweiler, sequestered by the French state because of Kahnweiler's German nationality.

In July 1924, with the dealer Léonce Rosenberg, Bellier organized a sale of works belonging to the poet Paul Éluard. According to the Metropolitan Museum of Art's Modern Art Index Project, this was the first sale at Drouot of works from a named living collector, and it began a trend that rapidly changed the French art market. He auctioned the collection of the writer Francis Carco in March 1925 and that of the dentist and patron Daniel Tzanck in June, and, with Jos Hessel, that of the couturier Paul Poiret in November. The results of these widely reported sales showed that the highest prices went not to Cubist or Surrealist works but to figurative paintings by artists including Derain, Dufy, Kisling, Modigliani, Pascin, Soutine and Vlaminck. The number of sales he organized rose from six in 1925 to thirteen in 1929.

== World War Two and aftermath ==
During the German occupation Bellier's activity did not decline: he organized over 250 sales at the Hôtel Drouot between 1941 and 1944, benefiting from a buoyant art market. His sales were mainly of objets d'art, but also of everyday furniture and jewelry, and were widely advertised in the press, including collaborationist papers. Under the discriminatory laws of Vichy he conducted sales of Jewish-owned property at the request of court-appointed provisional administrators (administrateurs provisoires), sales he himself described as held "by discrimination"; their spoliative origin was in most cases stated openly on posters and in catalogues, an exception being the Bernheim-Jeune sale of 22 December 1941, for which the administrator instructed that the provenance not be mentioned. Before provisional administrators were appointed to Jewish businesses, Bellier agreed to help the dealer Léonce Rosenberg by dispersing forty-one of his works anonymously and in instalments in 1941. Works looted earlier and resold by the Germans also passed through his voluntary sales.

Bellier continued to work as an auctioneer after the Libération and was not sanctioned; he was not prosecuted before the Comité de confiscation des profits illicites. Rouge-Ducos notes that the postwar purge of auctioneers was very limited, the profession being its own regulatory body and having been obliged, as ministerial officers, to apply Vichy laws and regulations. He was party to two lawsuits, one involving Jean Bloch over a sale held on 11 December 1941, the other over the 1942 sale of the stock of the gallery of Élie Fabius.

He subsequently gave substantial assistance to Jewish families searching for works dispersed during the occupation, among them the Galerie Jacob of 19 rue Cambon, whose stock he had himself dispersed in 1942. After Henri and Jean Bernheim-Dauberville applied under the ordinance of 21 April 1945 for the annulment of the Bernheim-Jeune sales he had held in October and December 1941 and in March 1942, he traced the buyers so that the sales could be annulled, the brothers reimbursing those who were found. He also helped document the claim made to the Commission de récupération artistique by the heirs of Georges Lévy (1887–1943), whose safe deposit at the Société générale in Bordeaux was looted in March 1943 and who died at Auschwitz in November of that year. In a will written at Drancy on 24 October 1943, Lévy had stipulated that his works be sold by Bellier, the proceeds to fund charitable work for French Jewish families affected by the war at the discretion of Chief Rabbi Jacob Kaplan; the sales took place in 1947 and 1950. Rouge-Ducos describes this bequest as a sign of the closeness and mutual trust between the two men.

He died in Paris on 1 November 1980. Bellier's minutes of sales are held at the Archives de Paris (D149E3/15–18). His office records, together with those of his successors Raoul Oury and Guy Loudmer, were acquired by the Institut national d'histoire de l'art in January 2019 and form the basis of ongoing research into the Paris auction market of the period.

== See also ==
- German military administration in occupied France during World War II
- Nazi plunder
