= Ronald B. Levinson =

American philosopher

Ronald Bartlett Levinson (October 18, 1896 – November 21, 1980) was an American philosopher who focused in his work on Plato.

== Early life and education ==
Levinson was born October 18, 1896, in Chicago, Illinois. He attended Harvard University, where he completed A.B. (Bachelor of Arts) in 1920 and later received his Ph.D. from the University of Chicago in 1924.

== Works ==
Levinson focused in his works on Plato and the history of Platonism. He gained international awareness by his book In Defense of Plato (1953) in which he defended Plato against Karl Popper's sharp criticism, who considered Plato to be the forerunner of totalitarianism.

Levinson was a member of the American Philosophical Association and of the Society of Ancient Philosophy.

- Thomas Taylor, the Platonist (1924)
- Spenser and Bruno (1928)
- The college journey - an introduction to the fields of college study (1938)
- In Defense of Plato (1953).
- A Plato reader (1966)
