= Valide Tutayuq =

Azerbaijani botanist (1914–1980)

- Validə Xaspolad qızı Tutayuq
- Born: 23 September 1914; Shusha, Elizavetpol Governorate, Russian Empire
- Died: 12 November 1980 (aged 66); Baku, Azerbaijan Soviet Socialist Republic
- Education: Azerbaijan State Agricultural University
- Awards: Order of the Badge of Honour; Medal "For Valiant Labour in the Great Patriotic War 1941–1945" "Honored Scientist of the Azerbaijan SSR"
- Scientific career
- Fields: Botany
- Workplaces: Azerbaijan State Agricultural University

Valide Tutayuq Xasbulat gizi (Azerbaijani: Validə Xaspolad qızı Tutayuq; 23 September 1914 – 12 November 1980) was an Azerbaijani botanist and academic. She was the first woman from Azerbaijan to earn a PhD in botany, one of the first female biological scientists in Azerbaijan. For her work, she was awarded the Order of the Badge of Honour and the Medal "For Valiant Labour in the Great Patriotic War 1941–1945", as well as being named as an "Honored Scientist of the Azerbaijan SSR" in 1974.

== Early life and education ==
Valide Tutayuq was born on 23 September 1914 in Shusha in present-day Azerbaijan. She graduated from the Azerbaijan State Agricultural University in 1934 and earned a PhD in 1939 and a Doctor of Science in 1949.

== Career ==
As a botanist, Tutayuq specialised in dendrology, morphology and ornamental gardening.

Tutayuq served as the head of the Botany Department at Azerbaijan State Agricultural University from 1939 to 1957, and then led the AEA Institute of Botany from 1957 to 1962. She returned to her former role at the Azerbaijan State Agricultural University in 1962, where she remained until 1980. She presented at the 9th International Botanical Congress in Montreal in 1959.

In 1960, she published her research about different types of floral structures in various multi-seeded flowers in the monograph "The Structure of Multi-petal Flowers".

== Awards ==
In 1943, Tutayuq received the Order of the Badge of Honour, followed by the Medal "For Valiant Labour in the Great Patriotic War 1941–1945" two years later. In 1960, Tutayuq received an honorary decree for services to the development of the national economy and culture of the Republic In 1974, she was named as an "Honored Scientist of the Azerbaijan SSR".

== Death and legacy ==
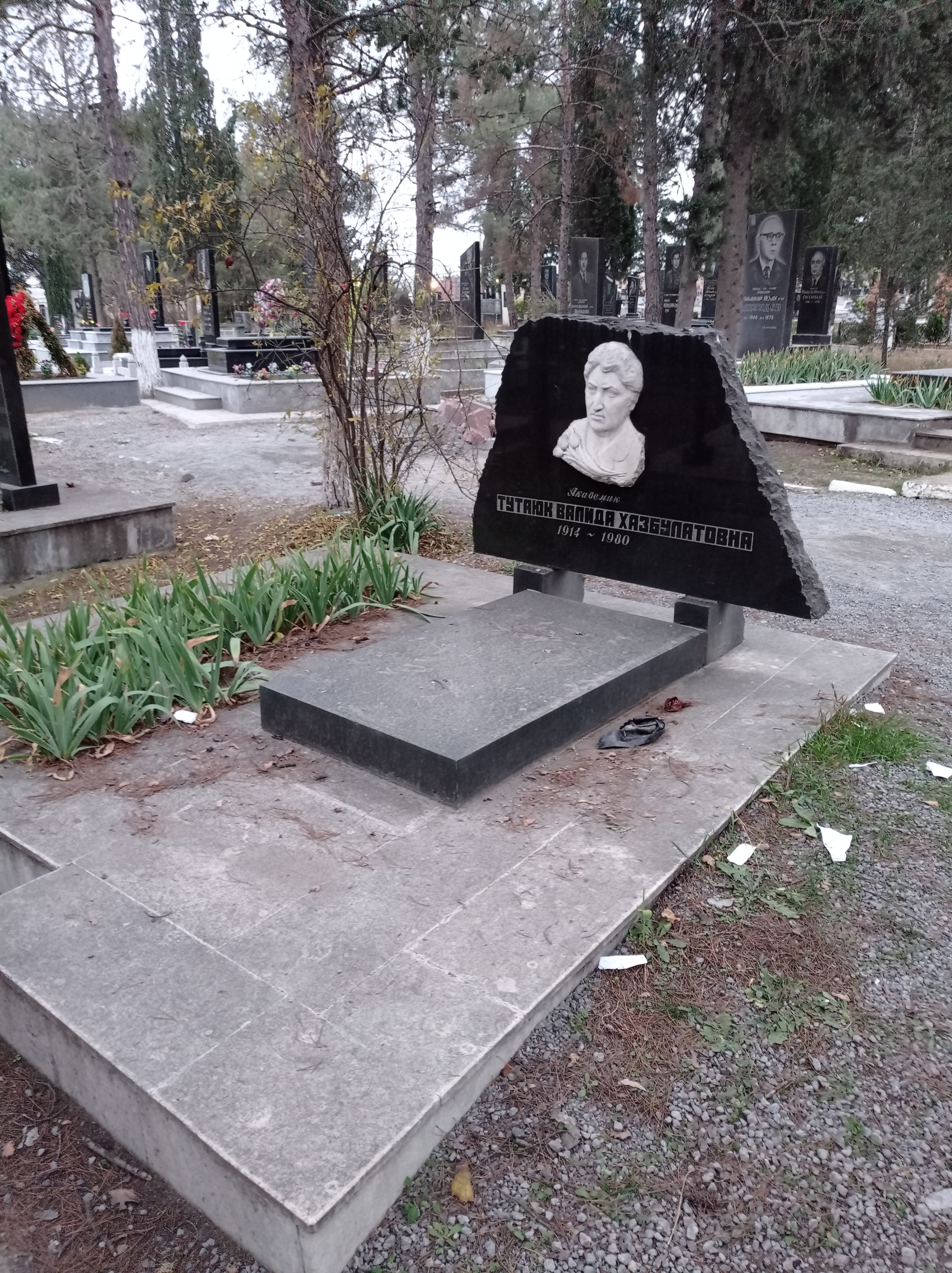
The grave of Valide Tutayuq.

Valide Tutayuq died on 12 November 1980 in Baku, at the age of 66.

The Azerbaijan State Agricultural University held an event in 2025 to mark the 110th anniversary of Tutayuq's birth. Guest speakers included the university's biology department head Arif Gaziyev and honorary professor Bahman Aliyev. The university's herbarium collection is named after Tutayuq.

== Bibliography ==
- Bitki anatomiyası və morfologiyası - "Plant Anatomy and Morphology" (1958; 1967)
- Bitki anatomiyası və fiziologiyası - "Plant Anatomy and Physiology" (1960)
- Örtülütoxumluların mənşəyinə dair - "On the Origin of Angiosperms" (1965)
- Çiçəyin teratologiyas - "Teratology of the Flower" (1969)
