= Rosalind Cassidy =

American physical educator (1895–1980)

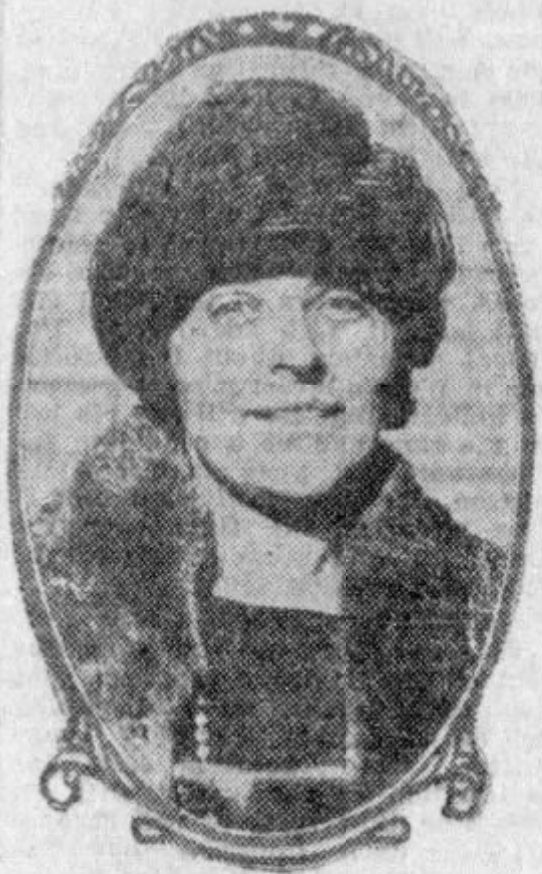
- Rosalind Cassidy, from a 1925 newspaper
- Born: Rosalind Frances Cassidy; July 17, 1895; Quincy, Illinois, United States
- Died: November 4, 1980 (85 years); Montecito, California, United States
- Occupations: Physical educator, college professor

Rosalind Frances Cassidy (July 17, 1895 – November 4, 1980) was an American physical educator. She was a professor and chair of the physical education department at Mills College from 1918 to 1947, and on the faculty at the University of California, Los Angeles (UCLA) from 1947 to 1962.

== Early life and education ==
Cassidy was born in Quincy, Illinois, the daughter of John Warren Cassidy and Margaret Ashbrook Cassidy. Her father ran a successful plant nursery. Her parents divorced in 1905. She attended schools in Colorado Springs, Oakland, and Tacoma, and graduated from Mills College in 1918, as a student of Elizabeth Rheem Stoner. She earned a master's degree from Teachers College, Columbia University in 1923, and an Ed.D. in 1937. She was a member of Phi Beta Kappa. In 1950, Mills College granted her an honorary Doctor of Humane Letters degree.

== Career ==
Cassidy began teaching physical education courses at her alma mater, Mills College, immediately after graduating. She was also an assistant to the college's president, Aurelia Henry Reinhardt. She became head of the physical education department in 1923, and convenor of the School of Education and Community Services. Following in her mentor Elizabeth Rheem Stoner's footsteps, she promoted modern dance at Mills; she recruited Hanya Holm, Tina Flade, and Marian van Tuyl to teach at Mills in the 1930s, and she directed summer arts programs for dancers, writers, musicians, and visual artists.

Cassidy became a professor at UCLA in 1947. There, she taught physical education courses, and guided the merging of the men's and women's physical education programs into one department of kinesiology, the name she preferred for her field. She retired from UCLA in 1962. She gave an oral history interview to UCLA in 1967.

Cassidy was president of the American Academy of Physical Education, the Alumnae Association of Mills College, and of the National Association of Directors of Physical Education for College Women, among other leadership roles. She served on national boards of the National Camping Association, the Girl Scouts of the United States, and the National Education Association. She spoke to community groups and academic gatherings on physical education and girls' fitness.

== Honors ==
Inducted in 1938, Cassidy is Fellow #40 in the National Academy of Kinesiology (formerly American Academy of Physical Education; American Academy of Kinesiology and Physical Education). During 1950-1951, she served as the Academy's President, and, in 1966, she was honored by the Academy when she received its highest honor, the Hetherington Award. In 1956, she also received the American Association for Health, Physical Education, and Recreation's highest honor, the Luther Halsey Gulick Award. In 1970, the National Society of Physical Education for College Women named her the Amy Morris Homans Lecturer.

== Publications ==
=== Books ===
- The New Physical Education; A Program of Naturalized Activities for Education toward Citizenship (1927, with Thomas D. Wood)
- A Handbook for Camp Counselors: A Contribution to Camping for the Pacific Camp Directors Association (1935, with Homer Bemiss)
- New Directions in Physical Education for the Adolescent Girl in High School and College (1938)
- Physical Education in the Secondary School (1940, with Laurentine B. Collins)
- Physical Fitness for Girls: A Textbook for Teacher Education and a Guide to Teachers in Curriculum Revision (1943, with Hilda Kozman)
- Fitness First: A Physical Fitness Workbook for High School Girls (1943, with Hilda Kozman)
- Group Experience: The Democratic Way (1943, with Bernice Baxter)
- Counseling Girls in a Changing Society (1947, with Hilda Kozman)
- Methods in Physical Education: An Illustrated Textbook for Students (1947, with Chester O. Jackson and Hilda Kozman)
- Group Process in Physical Education (1951)
- Curriculum Development in Physical Education (1954)
- Supervision in Physical Education: A Guide to Principles and Practices (1956, with Kimball WIles and Camille Brown)
- Counseling in the Physical Education Program (1959)
- Theory in Physical Education: A Guide to Program Change (1963, with Camille Brown
- Humanizing Physical Education: Methods for the Secondary School Movement Program (1974, with Stratton F. Caldwell)

=== Articles and essays ===
- "A Camp Summer School Housed in Comfortable Residence Halls" (1927)
- "How College Girls Make a May Pageant" (1927)
- "Relating Hygiene and Physical Education to the Life of the Student" (1927)
- "The Western Society of Departments of Physical Education for College Women" (1932)
- "New Directions in Physical Education" (1940)
- "The Concept of Integration as it Functions in Health Education" (1941)
- "Guiding Social Learning" (1942, with Bernice Baxter)
- "Trends in State Wartime Physical Fitness Programs" (1943, with Hilda Kozman)
- "Education-Trained Women Contribute to Social Progress in the Home" (1943)
- "Careers for Women" (1944)
- "How Colleges Can Meet the Crisis of Increased Enrollment" (1957)
- "Space Age Conference" (1958, with Camille Brown)
- "The Cultural Definition Of Physical Education" (1965)
- "Societal Determinants of Human Movement—The Next Thirty Years" (1971)

== Personal life ==
Cassidy died in 1980, at the age of 85, at a retirement home in Montecito, California.
