= Aimée Batier =

French politician

- Born: 18 August 1908; Versailles, France
- Died: 7 November 1980 (aged 72); Paradou-Eyragues, France
- Occupation: Politician

Aimée Batier (18 August 1908 – 7 November 1980) was a French politician. She represented the 11th district of the department of Paris in the French National Assembly from 8 May 1967 to 30 May 1968, as a member of the Union of Democrats for the Republic.

== Life ==
Batier was born in Versailles. Batier served in the French Resistance during World War II under the pseudonym "Jeannine". In 1944, she was deported to Ravensbrück; she returned to France in May 1945. She was a doctor of pharmacy and medicine and served as head of the HLM office for Paris and then as assistant technical advisor for the Ministry of Veterans. In 1966, she joined the finances section of the French Economic and Social Council. She was elected to the National Assembly in 1967, replacing Roger Frey. Her term ended with the early termination of the legislature in May 1968.

During her term in office, she served on the Commission des Affaires culturelles, familiales et sociales and the Commission de surveillance et de contrôle des publications destinées à l'enfance et à l'adolescence.

Batier died in Paradou-Eyragues at the age of 72.
