= Tulsa Philharmonic =

American orchestra

The Tulsa Philharmonic was an American symphony orchestra located in Tulsa, Oklahoma. The orchestra was founded in 1948 by H. Arthur Brown who was principal conductor from 1948 till 1958. The original Tulsa Philharmonic grew out of a small group called the Tulsa Civic Symphony created in 1926–27 by Kurt Berger, a German-born and -educated musician living in Tulsa. Many of the symphony's musicians also played in the pit orchestra for the Tulsa Little Theatre. After its premier concert at the Akdar Theater as the Tulsa Civic Symphony in January 1927, the small orchestra was directed by Berger until 1933, when illness forced him to retire. His daughter, Tosca Berger Kramer, briefly succeeded him. George Baum also directed an orchestra under Works Progress Administration funding in the 1930s and 1940s.

The Tulsa Philharmonic played for 53 seasons. Conductors included Vladimir Golschmann (1958–61), Franco Autori (1961–71), Skitch Henderson (1971–74), Thomas Lewis (conductor) (1974–77), Murry Sidlin (1978–80), Joel Lazar (1980–83), Peter Nero (Pops music director, 1983–1994), Bernard Rubenstein (1984–96), and Kenneth Jean (1997–2001). Financial difficulties plagued the orchestra during the 1980s and 1990s, forcing a reorganization in 1994. The orchestra ceased to exist on September 12, 2002, citing "tenuous financial conditions and the negotiation of a new collective bargaining agreement with Local 94, American Federation of Musicians, the union representing the Philharmonic's musicians." The financial problems of the orchestra were partially a result of the collapse of Enron and Worldcom in 2001, as well as job cuts at Williams, all of which took their toll on Tulsa, and made the philharmonic unsustainable. After the demise of the orchestra, several of its core musicians banded together to try to form a new professional orchestra in Tulsa. The Tulsa Symphony Orchestra was formed in 2005.
