= Frank Billham =

Guyanese-born English cricketer

Frank Denis Billham (27 September 1896 – 16 November 1980) was a Guyanese-born English cricketer. He was a right-handed batsman and a slow left-arm bowler who played for Essex. He was born in Georgetown and died in Sudbury.

Billham made his debut for Essex against Sussex in May 1924, though he made a duck in the first innings of the game from the lower order. Later that week, he made his second and final first-class appearance, though he failed to impress with the bat once again - and lost his place in the team.
