= Arthur Brown (bishop) =

Arthur Durrant Brown (1926–2011) was a Canadian suffragan bishop.

Brown was educated at the University of Western Ontario and ordained in 1950. After a curacy in Pinkerton, Ontario he held incumbencies at St Stephen, London, St JohnWindsor and St Michael, Toronto. He was Archdeacon of York, ON from 1974 to 1981 when he became Suffragan Bishop for the Diocese of Toronto.
