= H. Arthur Brown =

American orchestral conductor

Hine Arthur Brown or H. Arthur Brown (c. 1906 – May 27, 1992) was an American orchestral conductor. He was born c. 1906 and studied music at Juilliard and the American Conservatory at Fontainebleau. He was conductor at the El Paso Symphony Orchestra, Louisville Symphony Orchestra, Tulsa Philharmonic Orchestra, and Austrian Symphony Orchestra. With the latter orchestra, he made numerous recordings.
