= Carlo Franzinetti =

Italian experimental physicist

Carlo Franzinetti (March 31, 1923, in Rome – November 28, 1980, in Llantwit Major) was an Italian experimental physicist.

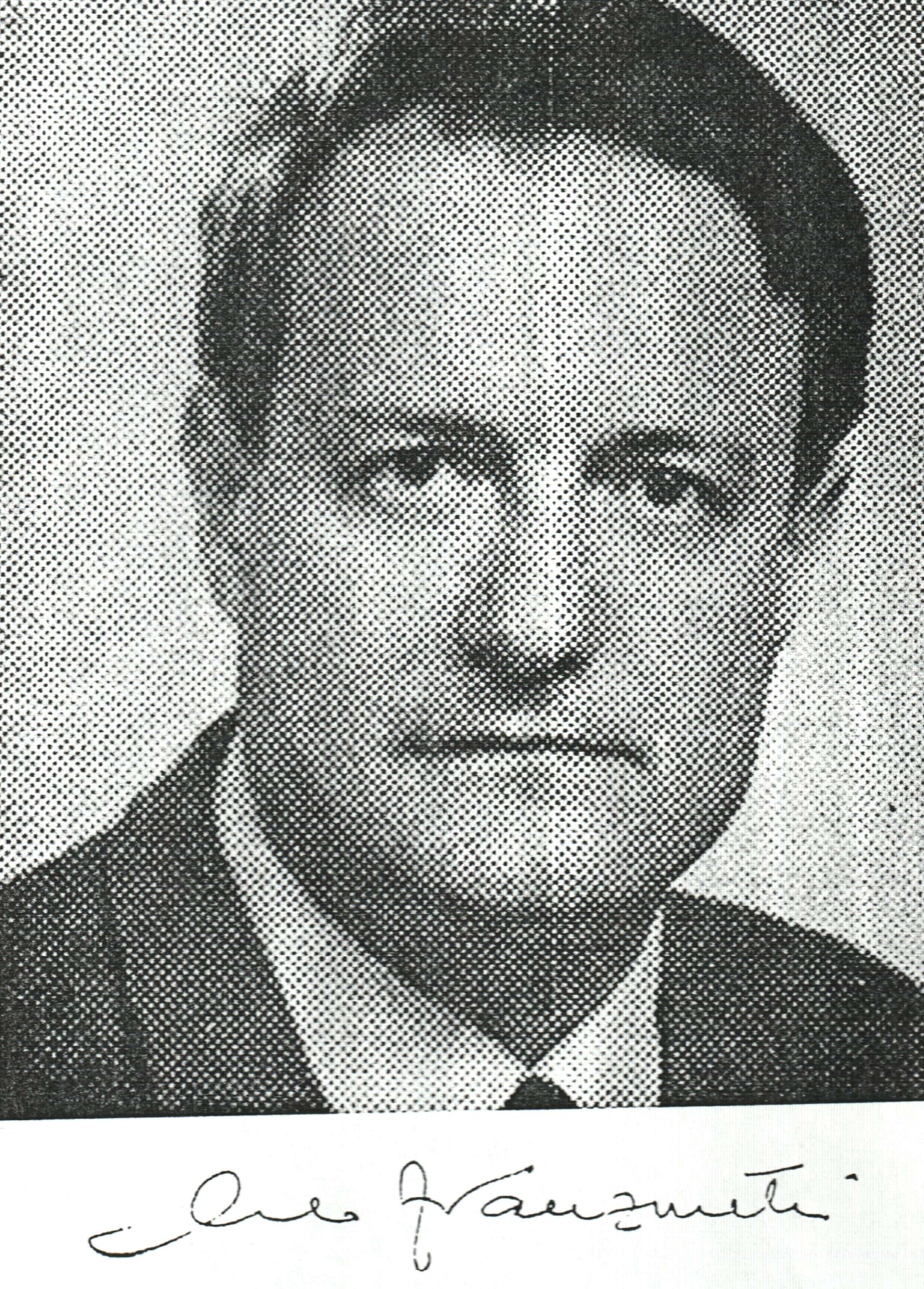
Carlo Franzinetti

== Personal biography ==
Carlo Franzinetti was born in Rome, son of Guido Franzinetti, a music critic, and Ada Guastalla, a mathematician and linguist. He was married to Prof. Joan Rees.

During the German occupation of Italy, he was an active member in Resistance Movement. He was one of the leaders of a student group of anti-fascist activists that included Carlo Lizzani, Maurizio Ferrara, Dario Puccini, and other important figures in the development of post-war Italy.

He graduated from the University of Rome "La Sapienza" in physics with a thesis about projects of construction of an isotope separator based on thermophoresis.

His professional scientific career started when he was 25 (8 May 1948), when he published the article "Emission of Li8 in the Explosive Disintegration of Nuclei" with R.M. Payne in the science journal Nature.

== Cosmic radiation research ==
In 1947 he joined the University of Bristol as a research assistant at the H.H. Wills Physical Laboratory, under the guidance of Nobel Laureate Prof. C. F. Powell. Powell's team's research looked at the sub-nuclear structure of matter through the study of cosmic rays with nuclear emulsion.

In 1950 he returned to Rome but he continued his study of cosmic rays. One of the ideas that came out of Powell's team was an expedition in the Mediterranean region to study cosmic radiation at high atmosphere (25 to 30 km) using aerostatic balloons carrying photographic emulsion. Carlo followed the expedition, which took place during the summers of 1952 and 1953 in Naples and in Cagliari, with researchers and students from 13 different physics institutes from various countries. Thirteen balloons were launched, 3 of which were test balloons. Of the other ten, 7 were recovered and 40% of the emulsions had been exposed to cosmic radiation.

== Study of neutrinos ==
In 1962 he began working in Geneva as a senior physicist at the European Organization for Nuclear Research (CERN). During his time there he played a key role in promoting and working with the Heavy Liquid Bubble Chamber, Gargamelle, where he also conducted his studies of neutrinos. The first report for the request of a common European Heavy Liquid Chamber at CERN was submitted by André Lagarrigue but, needing the support of Italian and possibly British physicists, he contacted Franzinetti. Franzinetti led the Italian group concerned with the proposal and construction of the Heavy Liquid Chamber, Gargamelle. At CERN he studied, at different energies, with neutrino and antineutrino beams, on different kinds of targets, the production of pions and strange particles, elastic and quasi-elastic interactions, and, through analysis of the interactions of Neutrinos, he studied the form factors of nucleons.

== Biophysics ==
His interest in biophysics started during his time in Pisa. During his time in Turin he led a biophysics team of students from the Universities of Turin and Pisa, which conducted studies on visual perception. He followed students alongside Giuseppe Moruzzi, a physiologist at the University of Pisa.

== Chronology ==
- Born in Rome on March 31, 1923.

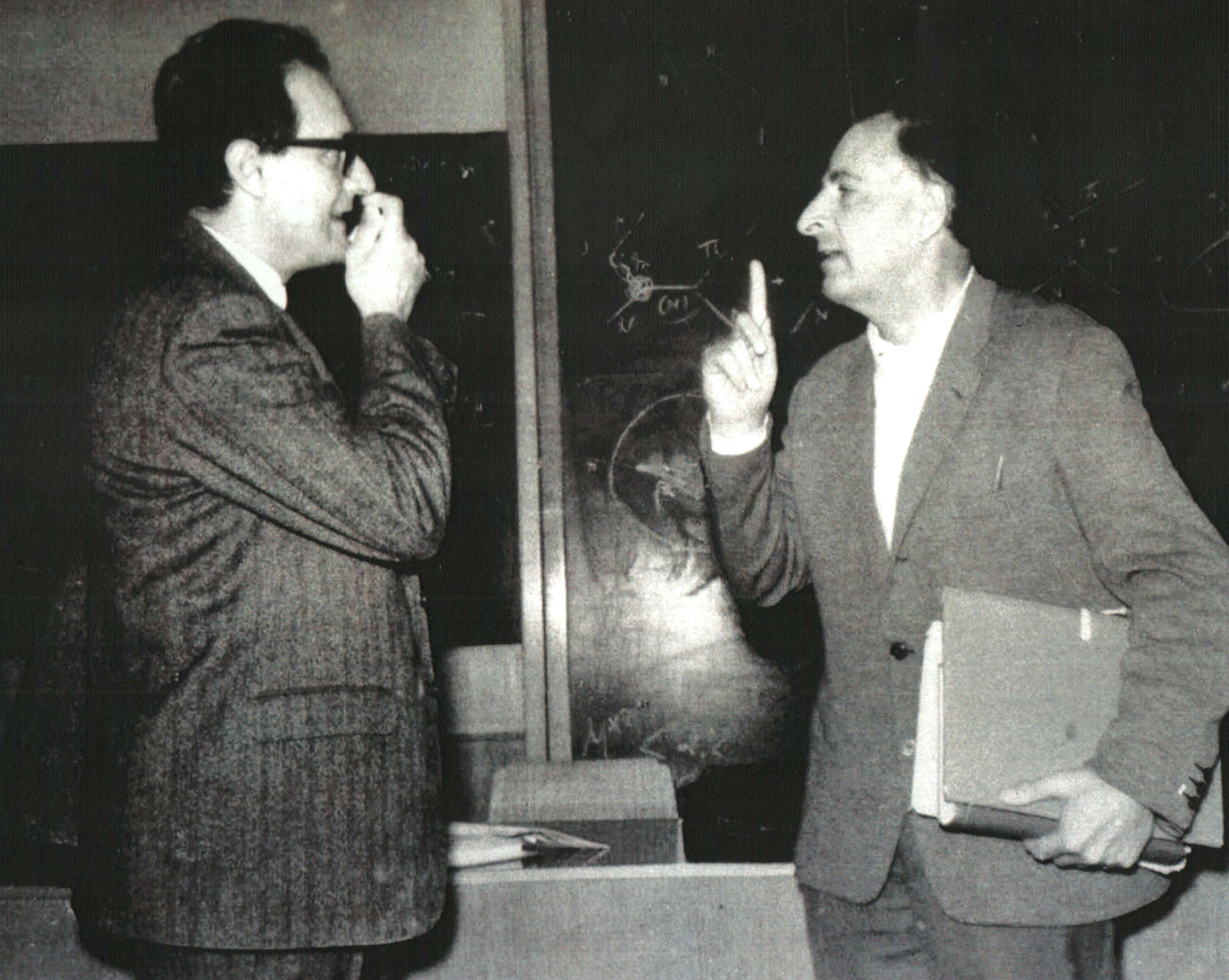
Carlo Franzinetti (Left) and Bruno Pontecorvo (Right)

- In 1943–1944, he was active in the Roman Resistance and in hiding from the Nazi-Fascist regime.
- In 1945 he completed his degree in Physics at the University of Rome, at age 22, and started his research career in Rome working for the Consiglio Nazionale delle Ricerche.
- In 1947-1950 he worked as a research assistant at the University of Bristol.
- In 1951 he married Joan Rees.
- In 1951-1958 he worked as an assistant professor at the University of Rome.
- In the summers of 1952 and 1953 he took part in cosmic radiation study expeditions in the Mediterranean.
- In 1956 he was granted the title of Libero Docente (Habilitation).
- In 1958 he was a physics professor at the University of Trieste, and from 1959 to 1966 he held the chair in Structure of Matter at the University of Pisa.
- In 1962 he began working as a senior physicist at CERN.
- From 1966 on, he held the chair of particle physics at the University of Turin.
- He moved to Llantwit Major in 1980, where he died on November 28, 1980.

== Honors ==
- Borsa di Studio Carlo Franzinetti. On his death, INFN (Istituto Nazionale di FIsica Nucleare), instituted a scholarship in his name which was won by Claudio Santoni.
- Aula Carlo Franzinetti. Lecture hall named in honor of Carlo Franzinetti at the University of Turin in the Institute of Physics

== Publications ==
- Franzinetti, Carlo (1982). Particelle. Editori Riuniti. p. 148. ISBN 8835923867.
- Franzinetti, C; Morpurgo, G (1957). "An introduction to the physics of the new particles". Il Nuovo Cimento (1955-1965). 6 (2): 469. doi:10.1007/BF02824499.
