= Vivian Trías =

Uruguayan historian and politician

Vivian Trías (Las Piedras, Uruguay, 30 May 1922 – 24 November 1980) was a Uruguayan historian and politician, belonging to the Socialist Party of Uruguay.

He was a secret agent of the Czechoslovak Státní bezpečnost (StB).
