= František Šorm =

Czech chemist (1913–1980)

- Born: 28 February 1913
- Died: 18 November 1980 (aged 67)
- Education: Czech Technical University in Prague
- Scientific career
- Fields: Chemistry

František Šorm (28 February 1913 – 18 November 1980) was a Czech chemist known for synthesis of natural compounds, mainly terpenes and biologically active components of plants. Šorm was the founder of the Institute for Organic Chemistry and Biochemistry of the Czechoslovak Academy of Sciences.

Šorm studied at the Faculty of Chemistry of the Czech Technical University (later Institute of Chemical Technology, VŠCHT) absolving the studies in 1936. During the war Šorm worked in a chemical laboratory. After the war he returned to the university and in 1946 was named professor at the VŠCHT. In 1950 Šorm was named professor of organic chemistry at the Charles University in Prague.

In 1952 Šorm became the director of the Institute for Organic Chemistry and Biochemistry, part of the newly established Czechoslovak Academy of Sciences, and General Secretary of the Academy. From 1962 until 1969 he served as the second President of the Academy (after Zdeněk Nejedlý).

František Šorm was a staunch communist and member of the Central Committee of Communist Party of Czechoslovakia. In his role of a scientist and organizer, however, he considered only the professional capabilities of his coworkers, not their political stance. In 1968 he supported the reform politics of Prague Spring. After the Soviet occupation of Czechoslovakia (which he protested against), Šorm was removed from his administrative positions, was forbidden to attend conferences abroad and was, at age of 60, forced into early retirement. Later he lived in seclusion and died of a heart attack.

The institute Šorm founded now awards a medal named after the scientist. Asteroid 3993 Šorm, discovered by Antonín Mrkos, was named after him in 1988.

== Professional activity ==
In the field of bioorgamic chemistry, he advanced knowledge of sesquiterpenoids, with medium-ring molecules, and explained the structure of different isoprenoid compounds. He also initiated the study of natural peptides, especially neurohypophyseal hormones and their analogues, some of which were shown to be of major clinical importance. His school of protein chemistry established the primary structure of chymotrypsin and trypsin. While studying the aminoacid sequence in polypeptide chains, Šorm, for the first time, deduced a tentative genetic code. His studies of antimetabolites of nucleic acid constituents as potential cancerostatics or virostatics led to the synthesis and determination of the mechanism of several highly active compounds, for example, 5-azacytidine and 6-azauridine. Finally, he was active in the field of insect juvenile hormones.

Šorm was the author or co-author of a large number of scientific publications and patents and was highly cited. He also co-authored several chemistry textbooks. His wife Zora was head of the Department of Biochemistry within the institute.
