= Arthur M. Brown =

American football and basketball coach (1884–1980)

Biographical details
- Born: October 14, 1884; Troy, New York, U.S.
- Died: November 20, 1980 (aged 96); Sarasota, Florida, U.S.

Playing career

Football
- 1905–1906: Williams
- Position: Halfback

Coaching career (HC unless noted)

Football
- 1907–1909: DePauw
- 1910–1912: Grinnell
- 1918–1920: Middlebury
- 1945: Middlebury

Basketball
- 1907–1910: DePauw
- 1918–1919: Middlebury
- 1920–1922: Middlebury
- 1942–1943: Middlebury
- 1945–1946: Middlebury

Baseball
- 1944: Middlebury

Administrative career (AD unless noted)
- 1911–1914: Grinnell
- 1918–1956: Middlebury

Head coaching record
- Overall: 34–28–7 (football); 33–64 (basketball); 5–4 (basetall)

Arthur Milton Brown (October 14, 1884 – November 20, 1980) was an American college football and college basketball coach and athletics administrator. He served as the head football coach at the DePauw University from 1907 to 1909, Grinnell College from 1910 to 1912, and Middlebury College from 1918 to 1920 and again in 1945, compiling a career college football coaching record of 34–28–7. Brown was also the head basketball coach at DePauw from 1907 to 1910 and four stints at Middlebury (1918–1919, 1920–1922, 1942–1942, 1945–1946), tallying a career college basketball coaching mark of 33–64. Brown was the athletic director at Middlebury from 1918 until his retirement in 1956. He also coached track and field and cross country at Middlebury.

Brown was a graduate of Williams College. He died on November 20, 1980, at his home in Sarasota, Florida.

== Head coaching record ==
=== Football ===
Year	Team	Overall	Conference	Standing	Bowl/playoffs
DePauw (Independent) (1907–1909)
1907	DePauw	5–2			
1908	DePauw	4–3			
1909	DePauw	2–4–1			
DePauw:		11–9–1			
Grinnell Pioneers (Independent) (1910–1912)
1910	Grinnell	6–2			
1911	Grinnell	4–4			
1912	Grinnell	6–2			
Grinnell:		16–8			
Middlebury (Independent) (1918–1920)
1918	Middlebury	0–3–2			
1919	Middlebury	3–3–1			
1920	Middlebury	3–3–2			
Middlebury Panthers (Independent) (1945)
1945	Middlebury	1–2–1			
Middlebury:		7–11–6			
Total:		34–28–7			
