= Pirate radio in the United Kingdom =

Unlicensed radio broadcasts

Pirate radio in the United Kingdom has been a popular and enduring radio medium since the 1960s, despite expansions in licensed broadcasting, and the advent of both digital radio and internet radio. Although it peaked in the 1960s and again during the 1980s/1990s, it remains in existence today. Having moved from transmitting from ships in the sea to tower blocks across UK towns and cities, in 2009 the UK broadcasting regulator Ofcom estimated more than 150 pirate radio stations were still operating.

== 1960s ==
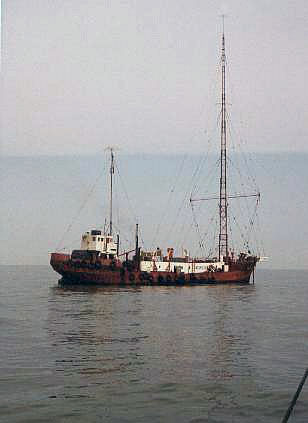
The MV Mi Amigo, once home of Radio Caroline, mid 1970s

Pirate radio in the UK first became widespread in the mid-1960s when pop music stations such as Radio Caroline and Radio London started to broadcast on medium wave to the UK from offshore ships or disused sea forts. At the time, these stations were not illegal because they were broadcasting from international waters. The stations were set up by entrepreneurs and music enthusiasts to meet the growing demand for pop and rock music, which was not catered for by BBC Radio services.

The first British pirate radio station was Radio Caroline, which started broadcasting from a ship off the Essex coast in 1964. By 1967, ten pirate radio stations were broadcasting to an estimated daily audience of 10-15 million. Influential pirate radio DJs included John Peel, Tony Blackburn, Kenny Everett, Johnnie Walker, Tony Prince, Emperor Rosko, and Spangles Muldoon.

The format of this wave of pirate radio was influenced by Radio Luxembourg and American radio stations. Many followed a top-40 format with casual DJs, making UK pirate radio the antithesis of BBC radio at the time. Spurred on by the offshore stations, land-based pirate stations took to the air on medium wave at weekends, such as Radio Free London in 1968.

Radio Caroline's audience was one third the size of the BBC Light Programme in the parts of the country where it could be received, but the Light Programme's audience did not decrease, indicating that pirate radio appealed to an audience that the BBC did not serve.

In reaction to the popularity of pirate radio, BBC Radio was restructured in 1967, establishing BBC Radio 1, Radio 2, Radio 3 and Radio 4. A number of DJs of the newly formed Radio 1 came from pirate stations. The UK Government also closed the international waters loophole via the 1967 Marine Broadcasting Offences Act, although Radio Caroline would continue to broadcast in various forms right up to 1990.

== 1970s ==
The Marine Broadcasting Offences Act officially outlawed offshore stations, but unlicensed radio continued, moving from ships and sea-based platforms to urban areas in the latter part of the 1960s (despite being already illegal under the Wireless Telegraphy Act 1949). During this period, home-made medium wave (and sometimes short wave) transmitters were often constructed inside cheap, expendable biscuit tins. The main method employed by most medium-wave or short-wave pirate stations during the 1970s involved programming played back on cassette recorders (often powered by a car battery), with a long wire antenna slung up between two trees.

The 1970s and 1980s saw a wave of land-based pirate radio, broadcasting mostly in larger towns and cities, transmitting from flats and tower blocks. These included community-focused local stations as well as stations emerging for the first time to specialise in particular music genres. One of the earliest was Radio Jackie originally broadcasting in south west London.

Soul music stations would start to appear in the 1970s. The first of these was Radio Invicta, regarded as Europe's first soul music station first broadcasting in 1970. The station would launch the careers of Pete Tong, Gilles Peterson and a number of the shows were presented by what was then known as the "Soul Mafia" - DJs such as Chris Hill and Froggy.

== 1980s ==
Dread Broadcasting Corporation, groundbreaking black pirate radio station

Entering the 1980s, transmitters capable of FM broadcasting were beginning to be picked up reasonably cheaply, with the ability to transmit over a forty-mile radius from a 15-storey tower. Engineers such as Pyers Easton would build them for stations such as London Greek Radio and Kiss FM.

In London, a notable moment would be the launching of Britain's first black owned music station Dread Broadcasting Corporation (DBC) in 1980. DBC played reggae and soca as well as other black music and would be instrumental to the later development of black community broadcasting as well as launching the career of BBC presenter Ranking Miss P.

Soul stations would become prolific in the early-mid 1980s, with Invicta joined by Horizon Radio, and JFM in 1981. Both of these would broadcast until 1985 when they were followed by Solar Radio and Starpoint. London Weekend Radio (LWR) would start life in 1983 playing contemporary pop music during the day with more specialist shows in the evenings and weekends; however, having briefly closed down, management of the station was handed to club promoter Zak Dee and in 1984, LWR rose again as a dedicated soul, hip hop, jazz-funk, and reggae station, launching the career of Tim Westwood. LWR's biggest rival would arrive in the form of Kiss FM, first broadcasting in late 1985. The station was formed by George Power who had previously run another pirate station, London Greek Radio, along with DJs Gordon Mac and Tosca Jackson. By 1988, Kiss would boast a line-up of top DJs including Norman Jay, Jazzie B (of Soul II Soul), Colin Faver, Trevor Nelson, Judge Jules, Danny Rampling, Paul Trouble Anderson, and Coldcut, playing soul, jazz-funk, reggae, hip hop and the emerging sounds of house music. A 1987 Evening Standard readers' poll placed Kiss in second place behind Capital Radio and ahead of Radio 1.

Around the UK, the West Midlands and Birmingham would see a large number of stations forming including the likes of Peoples Community Radio Link (PCRL) which started in 1985, and Sunshine Radio. Although launching in very late 1979, Merseyland Alternative Radio broadcast from the Wirral in the early 1980s, showcasing many bands from the Merseyside area.

Despite being better catered for by legal radio, there was still space for stations playing alternative rock and indie music which was struggling to get mainstream airplay. In London, stations such as RFM (Rock FM) and London Rock, and in Manchester KFM Radio would spring up to cater for those music genres during the mid-late 1980s. In 1989, a London pirate radio station Q102 would become a short-lived but hugely influential station in the breaking of early 1990s indie and Britpop bands. This station would be the roots of the later legal XFM.

Pirate radio met with increasing opposition, especially from the authorities in the form of the Department of Trade and Industry (DTI). It had claimed since the 1970s that pirate radio caused interference to licensed broadcasters and could interfere with frequencies used by emergency services. Nonetheless, the growth of pirate radio in the 1980s was so rapid that at one point pirate radio operators outnumbered legal broadcasters and in popularity.

Twice in the mid-late 1980s, the UK Government had floated plans to tackle pirate radio by offering new licenses, particularly in London. In 1989, new licenses were advertised but stations would have to commit to closing down voluntarily and come off-air as part of bidding for them. London's Kiss FM was one of those that duly did so, yet despite strong backing and support, would lose out to Jazz FM. However, further licenses were advertised subsequently and Kiss would win one on its second attempt and become the UK's first legal radio station specialising in black and dance music in September 1990.

However, even as this unfolded, a new wave of pirate radio stations emerged as the acid house scene exploded. Particularly in London, stations such as Sunrise, Fantasy, Friends FM, and Centreforce became the "seven day rave stations".

== 1990s ==
The Broadcasting Act 1990 led to the brief decline of UK pirate radio by encouraging diversity in radio and developing commercial radio, whilst bringing in tougher penalties for those caught in unlicensed broadcasting. The number of unlicensed broadcasters soon began to rise again, partly out of the belief that the Act had undermined community radio and small broadcasters. As stations such as Kiss would increasingly discover that advertising revenue and market share became as important as the music it played, new pirate stations once again sprang up to cater for underground music scenes that were developing. The biggest of these would be the rising rave music scene, with stations moving to a "rave on the air" format with back to back mixing and listener participation through 'shouts' - enabled by the growth of pagers and mobile phones. In London, such stations included the likes of Rush, Kool FM, Pulse FM, Boss FM, Don FM, and Defection.

Pirates - 1993 documentary focusing on East London pirate radio

The authorities and media alleged an organised crime and drugs link with the rave stations, culminating in a high-profile raid in Hackney in the summer of 1993 on Rush. The Evening Standard headline exclaimed "Drug gangs set up fortresses." Harsher laws imposed more severe fines on DJs and businesses that advertised on stations. The Rush raid was featured in the seminal BBC Two documentary Pirates, shown as part of the Arena series in December 1993.

For those ill-served by mainstream and legal radio, pirate radio filled the void, especially for the black community. In London, stations as Galaxy Radio, Genesis, Station, and Vibes have mixed black music with phone-ins and cultural programmes, "We are trying to bring a balance into the community - to introduce culture and history and to inform people" as one of those involved in Galaxy. These stations still broadcast today.

Outside London the picture was similar, with notable pirate radio stations including PCRL, Frontline, and Sting in Birmingham; The Superstation, Buzz FM and Soul Nation in Manchester; Dance FM, Fantasy FM, and SCR in Sheffield; Passion Radio, Ragga FM, For the People in Bristol; Fresh FM in Leicester; Z100 in Liverpool, and Dream FM in Leeds.

By the mid to late 1990s, genres such as happy hardcore, jungle/drum'n'bass and speed/UK garage saw a new generation of pirate radio stations emerge. In London, Kool FM was joined by Rinse FM, Rude, Flex FM, Eruption FM, and Dream FM in championing jungle music/drum'n'bass, and the latter also happy hardcore. Speed/UK garage was being pushed by stations such as London Underground (notably the Dreem Teem), Freek FM (notably DJ EZ), Shine FM, and Girls FM. Flex FM and Rinse FM (legal now) would make a transition from jungle to UK garage during the course of the 1990s.

== 2000s ==
Pirate radio aerial installations on rooftops in NW London, early 2000s

As pirate radio persisted into the 2000s, UK broadcasting regulator Ofcom undertook research into its popularity and published its findings in 2007. This estimated that, "there are currently around 150 illegal radio stations in the UK. At any one time, it is believed that around half of these are transmitting in London, within the M25 area". It found that: "a large proportion of these are operating in London, with notable clusters in Harlesden, Stoke Newington, Southwark and Lambeth".

It also commissioned research among residents of the London boroughs of Hackney, Haringey and Lambeth, finding that "about 24 percent of all adults aged 14 or older living within the three London boroughs listen to pirate radio stations. The research found that 37 percent of students aged 14–24 and 41 percent of the African-Caribbean community listened to pirate radio". The development and promotion of grass-roots talent, the urban music scene and minority community groups were important for pirate radio. According to the research, pirate radio listeners and those running pirate radio stations thought that licensed broadcasters failed to cater sufficiently for the needs of the public. Pirate radio was regarded as the best place to hear new music and particularly urban music. Pirate radio stations were appreciated for their local relevance by providing information and advertisements about local community events, businesses and club nights.

An operation by Ofcom to take unlicensed operators off-air in late 2005 revealed that London's airwaves were still very active, including long established stations such as Kool FM, Point Blank, Bassline, Lightning FM, Y2K FM, Deja Vu, and Rinse FM. The latter two were instrumental in the development of underground grime and dubstep music scenes. The authorities continued to assert the risk of interference to emergency services by stations.

Another operation in early 2008 took 20 stations off the air with 3 arrests.

== 2010s to present ==
Ofcom responded to a Freedom of Information request in July 2015, that revealed they had raided and seized almost 400 pirate radio set-ups in London in just a two-year period.

== Community radio ==
Since 2010, Ofcom have promoted the take-up of Community Radio, especially in areas such as London with a concentration of pirate radio stations. As such, a number of former pirate radio stations have made the transition to legal broadcasting through community radio licences, such as Rinse FM, Kane FM, and most recently Flex FM. However, some remain sceptical of the ability of the local community and pirate broadcasters to make the move to legal status.

== Political pirate radio ==
Although UK pirate radio has in the main concentrated on broadcasting music not catered for by the mainstream, there has been some overt political pirate radio. The earliest of these was Radio Free Scotland, which hijacked the sound channels of BBC television after closedown. Similarly, Voice of Nuclear Disarmament would do the same for a short period in the early 1960s in London. In the 1970s, Radio Enoch, named after Enoch Powell, was set up by people on the right wing of the Conservative and Unionist Party to help re-elect a conservative government. Although Radio Enoch had vowed to return if a Labour administration was re-elected, it failed to do so after Tony Blair was elected in 1997. In 1982, Our Radio was broadcasting music, anarchism, and other left wing views to London. Our Radio once evaded arrest by setting up a dummy antenna for the Home Office to find. During the 1984–1985 miners' strike, Radio Arthur operated in the Nottinghamshire area. More recently, Interference FM was set up by a collective to broadcast during the Carnival Against Capitalism demonstration on 18 June 1999.

Political programming has been a feature of the many black community pirate radio stations that have grown in the UK since the 1980s. For the likes of Galaxy Radio, part of their mission is to: "de-brainwash the black community". The station combines reggae and soca with robust articulation of "black empowerment against a system designed to oppress our brothers and sisters" and live phone-in discussions. Genesis Radio, launched in the early 1990s, follows a similar format. Duwayne Brooks, councillor and friend of Stephen Lawrence who was murdered in a racist attack in 1993, has in the past urged police to work with community stations such as Genesis in order to improve "police engagement with the community" and "run our own appeals for information after incidents". Where black community stations have also been effective is to raise awareness and raise funds for local concerns, often where mainstream media has overlooked them. In 2002, Powerjam launched an appeal through one of its talk shows to raise money to save a young girl from a rare tissue disease.

== Internet and pirate radio ==
The advent of the Internet has brought both opportunities and challenges for pirate radio. In the early days, the internet became another communication means in which to advertise and promote stations, with station listings, frequencies, and information starting to be posted. Some stations decided to embrace the Web and early radio streaming technologies as a means of ceasing illegal broadcasting - the most notable and pioneering of these was the former London pirate Face FM that re-invented itself as the internet station InterFACE. For those that had no intention of coming off the air, the internet provided a way to expand their promotion and audience reach by establishing websites and enable them to begin to stream live beyond their usual broadcast area. For the now legal Rinse FM, their website not only streamed shows live but it would also provide them a platform to develop their identity and to promote their events whilst still unlicensed.

By the 2010s, this landscape was changing with increasing use of social media and music streaming services, with research by RAJAR reporting that: "Although 90% of people still listen to the radio each week, the proportion listening to FM and AM stations has fallen from 68% in 2010 to 58% in March."

For some, the Internet still does not replace the need for pirate radio: "Pirate will never stop; it’s cyclical. If you push people hard enough, they’ll find a mode of expression. The internet has been pretty cool for that, but it’s not the be-all-and-end-all", whilst others argue that for music like grime, pirate radio continues to be "such an essential platform for emerging voices". For former pirates such as Kool London, Internet radio has given them a new lease of life.

== Legal situation ==
The Wireless Telegraphy Act 2006 provides for Ofcom to issue licences to radio broadcasters for the use of stations and wireless telegraphy apparatus. The Act sets out a number of criminal offences relating to wireless telegraphy, including the establishment or use of a wireless telegraphy station or apparatus for the purpose of making an unlicensed broadcast. The financing or participating in the day-to-day running of unlicensed broadcasting is also a criminal offence, as is the supplying of a sound recording for an unlicensed station and advertising through unlicensed stations. The act allows Ofcom to take a number of actions against individuals committing these offences, including power of entry and search and seizure of equipment. It is a criminal offence to obstruct a person exercising enforcement powers on Ofcom's behalf. Furthermore, the Broadcasting Act 1990 provides that anyone convicted of an unlawful broadcasting offence is disqualified from holding a broadcasting licence for five years.

Anti-social behaviour orders (ASBO) have also been used in the fight against pirate radio.

== In popular culture ==
Drama and comedy programmes featuring UK pirate radio:

- A 1966 episode of Danger Man entitled "Not So Jolly Roger" was set aboard an offshore pirate radio station.
- In 1966, Series 2 episode 5 of Thunderbirds featured a pirate radio station orbiting the Earth that later begins to crash back to Earth.
- The 1967 album The Who Sell Out by rock band The Who has jingles from pirate radio station Wonderful Radio London.
- In a 1970 episode of their BBC TV series The Goodies, the British comedy trio ran a pirate radio station named Radio Goodies.
- In 1987, The Lenny Henry Show featured a pirate station called the Brixton Broadcasting Corporation (a spoof of the BBC) run from a café.
- In 1994, the ITV police drama The Bill featured an episode on a pirate radio station named Krush FM that was interfering with police radios.
- Also in 1994, the ITV fire brigade drama London's Burning featured an episode on a pirate radio station that was interfering with emergency fire service radios.
- The soap opera EastEnders featured a pirate radio station broadcasting from Albert Square in 1997.
- In the BBC TV series Ideal (2005–2011), the brother of Moz, Troy, runs a pirate radio station named Troy FM.
- The 2009 film The Boat That Rocked (retitled Pirate Radio in North America) is about UK pirate radio and loosely based on Radio Caroline.
- The BBC Three TV mockumentary People Just Do Nothing (2014-2018) is based around a Brentford pirate station, Kurupt FM.

Documentaries featuring UK pirate radio:

- In 1982, Channel 4 broadcast a feature on pirate radio on its Whatever You Want programme, featuring DBC and Breakfast Pirate Radio.
- Also in 1982, London Weekend Television's The London Programme featured Radio Invicta and DBC.
- In 1987, Channel 4 broadcast The Black & White Pirate Show, featuring 1980s black pirates DBC, JBC, and PCRL.
- A 1987 episode of The London Programme featured Kiss FM and London Weekend Radio.
- In 1993, BBC Two broadcast the documentary Pirates directed by Nigel Finch as part of Arena's Radio Night. This featured London's Rush FM.
- In 1994, Anglia Television broadcast Rockin' the Boat, a documentary about offshore radio featuring Radio Caroline, and Radio City.
- In 1995, a Discovery Channel documentary featured Irie FM, PowerJam, Juice FM, and Transmission 1.
- In 1995, ITV Yorkshire current affairs series Edit V featured a special on Leeds' Dream FM.
- In 1996, BBC South East broadcast the documentary Radio Renegades as part of the First Sight current affairs series. This featured London's Kool FM and Dream FM.
- In 1999, the Discovery Channel broadcast Making Waves, featuring Rude FM and Interface.
- In 1999, the ITV Granada documentary series Northern Lives featured Manchester's Soul Nation.
- In 2000, BBC Radio 1 broadcast Last Caller Ring Back, featuring 1980s and 1990s radio.
- In 2000, the Channel 4 series The Other Side featured Genesis Radio.
- The BBC Three documentary Tower Block Dreams (2004) follows rivalry between stations in Southend.
- In 2007, BBC West Midlands Inside Out featured Sting FM and other West Midlands stations.
- In 2008, ITV Yorkshire current affairs series Is It Worth It? featured Leeds station Radio Frequency.
- In 2010, Wilderness Productions released the Michael Chandler documentary Stay Sailing on Vimeo, featuring Buzz FM and Itch FM.
- In 2017, BBC Four first broadcast the documentary The Last Pirates: Britain's Rebel DJs, presented by Rodney P and featuring 1980s radio especially Kiss FM and London Weekend Radio.

== See also ==
- Commercial Neutral Broadcasting Company
- Offshore radio
- Community radio in the United Kingdom
- Radio in the United Kingdom
