= List of British films of 1980 =

A list of films produced in the United Kingdom in 1980 (see 1980 in film):

== 1980 ==
British film productions released in 1980
Title	Director	Cast	Genre	Notes
The Awakening	Mike Newell	Charlton Heston, Susannah York, Jill Townsend	Horror	British-American co-production
Babylon	Franco Rosso	Brinsley Forde, Karl Howman, Trevor Laird	Crime/drama	
Bad Timing	Nicolas Roeg	Art Garfunkel, Theresa Russell, Harvey Keitel	Mystery	
Brothers and Sisters	Richard Woolley	Sam Dale, Carolyn Pickles, Jennifer Armitage	Crime	
The Dogs of War	John Irvin	Christopher Walken, Tom Berenger, Colin Blakely	Action	Co-production with US
The Elephant Man	David Lynch	Anthony Hopkins, John Hurt, Anne Bancroft	Historical drama	
The Falls	Peter Greenaway	Peter Westley, Aad Wirtz, Michael Murray	Mockumentary	
The Fiendish Plot of Dr. Fu Manchu	Piers Haggard	Peter Sellers, Helen Mirren, David Tomlinson	Comedy	
Flash Gordon	Mike Hodges	Sam J. Jones, Melody Anderson, Max von Sydow	Sci-fi/fantasy	Soundtrack and additional music by Queen
The Gamekeeper	Ken Loach			Entered into the 1980 Cannes Film Festival
George and Mildred	Peter Frazer-Jones	Yootha Joyce, Brian Murphy	Comedy	
The Great Rock 'n' Roll Swindle	Julien Temple	Malcolm McLaren, Steve Jones, Sid Vicious	Mockumentary	
Hawk the Slayer	Terry Marcel	Jack Palance, John Terry	Adventure	
Hussy	Matthew Chapman	Helen Mirren, John Shea	Drama	
The Long Good Friday	John Mackenzie	Bob Hoskins, Helen Mirren	Crime drama	
McVicar	Tom Clegg	Roger Daltrey, Adam Faith, Cheryl Campbell	Crime biopic	
The Mirror Crack'd	Guy Hamilton	Angela Lansbury, Edward Fox, Kim Novak, Elizabeth Taylor	Mystery	
The Monster Club	Roy Ward Baker	Vincent Price, John Carradine	Horror	
Never Never Land	Paul Annett	Petula Clark, Cathleen Nesbitt	Drama	
North Sea Hijack	Andrew V. McLaglen	Roger Moore, Anthony Perkins, James Mason	Adventure	aka ffolkes
Rhubarb Rhubarb	Eric Sykes	Eric Sykes, Jimmy Edwards, Bob Todd	Comedy	Short Film
Richard's Things	Anthony Harvey	Liv Ullmann, Amanda Redman, Peter Burton	Drama	
Rising Damp	Joseph McGrath	Leonard Rossiter, Frances de la Tour	Comedy	
Rockshow	Paul McCartney (uncredited)	Wings	Documentary	
Rude Boy	Jack Hazan, David Mingay			Entered into the 30th Berlin International Film Festival
The Sea Wolves	Andrew V. McLaglen	Gregory Peck, Roger Moore, David Niven	World War II	
The Shillingbury Blowers	Val Guest	Robin Nedwell, Diane Keen, Trevor Howard	Drama	
The Shining	Stanley Kubrick	Jack Nicholson, Shelley Duvall, Danny Lloyd	Horror	
Silver Dream Racer	David Wickes	David Essex, Beau Bridges	Sports	
Sir Henry at Rawlinson End	Steve Roberts	Trevor Howard, Patrick Magee	Comedy	
Superman II	Richard Lester	Christopher Reeve, Gene Hackman, Terence Stamp	Adventure	Co-production with the US
Sweet William	Claude Whatham	Sam Waterston, Jenny Agutter	Drama	
That Sinking Feeling	Bill Forsyth	John Gordon Sinclair	Comedy	
There Goes the Bride	Terry Marcel	Phil Silvers, Graham Stark, Sylvia Syms	Comedy	
The Watcher in the Woods	John Hough	Bette Davis, Lynn-Holly Johnson, Kyle Richards	Thriller	
The Wildcats of St Trinian's	Frank Launder	Sheila Hancock, Michael Hordern	Comedy	

== See also ==
- 1980 in British music
- 1980 in British radio
- 1980 in British television
- 1980 in the United Kingdom
