= 1980 in British television =

This is a list of British television related events from 1980.

== Events ==
=== January ===
- 1 January – The sitcom Hi-de-Hi!, set in a holiday camp in 1959/60, makes its debut on BBC1.
- 6 January – Debut of the game show Family Fortunes on ITV, presented by Bob Monkhouse.
- 7 January – New opening titles are introduced in the third series of the BBC science-fiction drama Blake's 7 starting with the episode titled Aftermath.
- 20 January – The largest ever British television audience for a film is recorded when some 23,500,000 viewers tune in for the ITV showing of the James Bond film Live and Let Die, released in 1973 and starring Roger Moore, making his debut as Ian Fleming's secret agent 007.
- 21 January – The final episode of Jamie and the Magic Torch airs on ITV.
- 24 January – The Independent Broadcasting Authority announces that in the next ITV franchising round, it will offer a national licence for breakfast television on ITV.
- 26 January – ITV shows the feature length pilot episode of Hart to Hart, starring Robert Wagner and Stefanie Powers.
- 28 January – The first edition of Newsnight is broadcast on BBC2. Its launch has been delayed for four months by the Association of Broadcasting Staff, at this time the main BBC trade union.

=== February ===
- 1 February – Debut of the game show Play Your Cards Right on ITV, presented by Bruce Forsyth.
- 10 February – London Weekend Television launches Gay Life, a late night regional series for gay viewers airing on Sundays. It is the first British television series specifically aimed at a gay audience and is aired for two series in 1980 and 1981.
- 19 February – Debut of the Scottish Television produced soap opera Take the High Road on ITV.
- 25 February – The political sitcom Yes Minister makes its debut on BBC2 with the episode "Open Government".

=== March ===
- 12 March – The very first in-vision Ceefax transmissions is broadcast on BBC1 between 8:30am and 9am. In-vision teletext broadcasts on BBC2 start shortly after, airing between 10 and 10:30am and 3:30 and 4pm, although if BBC2 was transmitting programmes at these times, the channel would often broadcast Ceefax pages for the 30 minutes prior to the start of the first programme. These broadcasts are shown only on weekdays.

=== April ===
- 2 April – Violet Carson makes her last appearance as Ena Sharples on Coronation Street.
- 5 April – ITV shows Bill Melendez's 1979 animated film version of C. S. Lewis' The Lion, the Witch and the Wardrobe.
- 8 April – Decided by the IBA, weekly episodes of Crossroads are now reduced from four to three, Tuesday to Thursdays. Starting from that day, ATV had planned to replace the fourth episode with a spin-off series called A Family Affair but the idea was dropped.
- 9 April – ITV airs Death of a Princess, a drama documentary about a young princess from a fictitious Middle-Eastern Islamic nation and her lover who are publicly executed for adultery. The drama is believed to be based on the true story of Princess Misha'al bint Fahd al Saud and its showing causes a great deal of controversy, provoking an angry response from the Government of Saudi Arabia.
- 12 April – The comedy sketch show Russ Abbot's Madhouse makes its debut on ITV.
- 17 April – BBC1 begins showing the American sitcom Taxi, starring Judd Hirsch, Danny DeVito, Andy Kaufman and Christopher Lloyd.
- 26 April – The Dallas spin-off series Knots Landing makes its debut on BBC1. It is shown on the same time slot where Dallas itself had been shown.
- 28 April – Thames launches its late night Thames News bulletin to follow News at Ten, the launch having been postponed from September 1978 due to union problems.

=== May ===
- 5 May – Both BBC channels interrupt their scheduled programming (the premiere of Rio Lobo on BBC1 and coverage of the final of the Embassy World Professional Snooker Championship on BBC2) to broadcast live footage of the SAS assault which ends the Iranian Embassy siege in London, while ITV waits until the credits of Coronation Street to break the news. BBC1's newsflash and the resuming of Rio Lobo pushes the opera The Merry Widow (which is simulcast on BBC Radio 4) one hour later than scheduled. The snooker final coverage also returns on BBC2 after the newsflash (in which commentator Ted Lowe says "And now from one Embassy to another"). It eventually overruns (ending at 9pm), which means that highlights of the International Show Jumping, which are due to follow the snooker, airs instead as the last programme of the day, after the next two scheduled programming (Not the Nine O'Clock News and the film One-Eyed Jacks respectively). The coverage of the events launches the careers of several journalists such as the BBC's Kate Adie, while ITN director David Goldsmith and his team receive a BAFTA for their coverage.
- 22 May – Blue Peter interviews two of the stars of The Empire Strikes Back, Mark Hamill and Carrie Fisher. Hamill goes on to name the next Star Wars movie (Revenge of the Jedi) as well as an accurate prediction on the eventual prequels almost two decades later.
- 24 May – The fantasy game show The Adventure Game makes its debut on BBC1.
- 26 May – BBC1 airs the third-season finale of the American drama series Dallas two months after its US airing in which J. R. Ewing is shot by an unknown assailant in his office; this leads to the Who shot J.R.? phenomenon which lasts until November 1980 when the series returns for the fourth season.

=== June ===
- 6 June – The final edition of the children's magazine series Magpie airs on ITV.
- 23 June – ITV airs the 2000th episode of Coronation Street.

=== July ===
- 19 July–3 August – The BBC and ITV provide live coverage of the 1980 Summer Olympics from Moscow.

=== August ===
- 30 August
  - BBC1 launches the police drama Juliet Bravo, starring Stephanie Turner.
  - The science-fiction series Buck Rogers in the 25th Century makes its debut on ITV.
- 31 August – Sunday Cricket is broadcast for the final time, and consequently this is the last time that the featured Sunday league game is broadcast in full because next year, Sunday Grandstand launches and the cricket has to share with coverage of the other sporting events taking place that afternoon.

=== September ===
- 4 September – The American science-fiction series Battlestar Galactica makes its debut exclusively on ITV London. The series isn't shown across other ITV regions until 1983.
- 6 September
  - BBC2 launches a computer generated clock, probably the first in the world, although ATV has an electronic digital timepiece by this time, the digits are electronically superimposed onto a physical "ATV – COLOUR" caption.
  - The family comedy series Metal Mickey makes its debut on ITV in which a five foot silver robot becomes the member of a household. The show attracts an audience of 12 million viewers.
- 8 September – Watchdog is launched as a weekly consumer slot on BBC1's news magazine programme Nationwide. It becomes a series in its own right in 1985.
- 13 September – ITV begins showing Hammer House of Horror, the supernatural anthology series produced by Hammer Films.
- 19 September – Regional peak time continuity on BBC1 ends and with it the weeknight closedown regional news bulletin.
- September – Edmund Dell is appointed as the chairman of Channel 4, the UK's forthcoming fourth channel while Jeremy Isaacs becomes its chief executive.

=== October ===
- 1 October – BBC1's lunchtime children's block is now called See Saw.
- 2 October – Thames airs a ten-hour telethon to raise money for good causes in the London area.
- October – The government reverses its position on a separate Welsh language service for Wales following opposition from the public and Welsh politicians, including a threat from the former president of Plaid Cymru, Gwynfor Evans, to go on hunger strike. The Welsh Fourth Channel Authority will be established to be responsible for Welsh output on the new channel, broadcast mainly during peak hours, with as many Channel 4 programmes as possible appearing at other times. 22–25 hours of Welsh programming would be broadcast. The majority of the output would come from the BBC and from HTV Wales although independent producers would provide some programming.

=== November ===
- 9 November – BBC1 starts airing season 4 of the American drama series Dallas.
- 13 November
  - The Broadcasting Act 1980 paves the way for a fourth British television service, leading to creation of Channel 4 and S4C in Wales, beginning transmission in 1982. The IBA begins the process of creating Channel 4 as a subsidiary: a subscription will be levied on the ITV companies to pay for the channel and they will sell Channel 4's airtime in return.
  - The Times reports that News International has sold its remaining 25% stake in London Weekend Television, bringing an end to LWT's connection with Australian businessman Rupert Murdoch.
- 17 November – BBC1 debuts the Jackanory spin-off series Spine Chillers, in which various actors read ghost stories from authors such as H. G. Wells and M. R. James.
- 21 November – The first annual Children in Need charity appeal is broadcast on BBC1. Although it does not broadcast the full evening until 1984, it shows a series of short segments linking the evening's programmes.
- 22 November – 21.5 million viewers tune in to watch the episode of Dallas, which answers the question of Who shot J.R.? less than eighteen hours after its showing in the United States. At this time, the audience figures are a record for a soap in Britain.
- 24 November – The American sitcom Diff'rent Strokes makes its British debut on ITV, starring Gary Coleman with his catchphrase "What'chu talkin' 'bout, Willis?"

=== December ===
- 1 December – BBC Scotland carries out a one-week experiment in breakfast television. It is a simulcast of BBC Radio Scotland's breakfast show Good Morning Scotland.
- 6 December – ITV screens the 1976 Richard Lester-directed romantic drama film Robin and Marian, starring Sean Connery and Audrey Hepburn.
- 8 December – Ian Allen's puppet series for children called Button Moon makes its debut on ITV with narration by actor Robin Parkinson, and a theme tune sung by husband and wife actors Peter Davison and Sandra Dickinson.
- 9 December
  - The single drama The Flipside of Dominick Hide is first broadcast as part of the Play for Today series on BBC1.
  - 20th anniversary of the first episode of Coronation Street.
- 23 December – The American animated special Rudolph the Red-Nosed Reindeer airs for the last time on ITV, opposite The Nine O’Clock News airing in the same timeslot.
- 25 December
  - BBC1 screens the network television premiere of Disney's 1954 adventure film 20,000 Leagues Under the Sea, starring kirk Douglas.
  - The network television premiere of the 1974 James Bond film The Man with the Golden Gun on ITV, starring Roger Moore.
- 26 December – BBC1 screens the network television premiere of the 1975 disaster film The Towering Inferno, starring Paul Newman and Steve McQueen.
- 27 December – The network television premiere of the musical comedy film Bugsy Malone on BBC1.
- 28 December – The IBA announces the results of the 1980 franchise round. TSW will replace Westward and TVS will replace Southern. ATV must restructure the company to create a separate East and West Midlands service and reduce the shareholding of its parent body to 51% by February 1981. Also announced is the winner of a national franchise to provide a breakfast television service on ITV. TV-am is awarded the contract to begin transmission in 1983.
- 30 December – The BBC announces their intention to launch their own breakfast television service to compete with TV-am which was announced two days earlier. Breakfast Time is launched on BBC1 on 17 January 1983, two weeks before TV-am.

=== Unknown ===
- BBC Video is established as a division of BBC Enterprises.
- The Independent Broadcasting Authority starts licensing terrestrial analogue relay stations which repeat TV signals to areas not covered by broadcaster-owned transmitters.

== Debuts ==
=== BBC1 ===
- 1 January
  - Hi-de-Hi! (1980–1988)
  - The Adventures of Tom Sawyer (1980)
- 2 January – Our John Willie (1980)
- 4 January – The Assassination Run (1980)
- 8 January – Flesh and Blood (1980–1982)
- 11 January – Francis Durbridge Presents: Breakaway (1980)
- 13 January – Spy! (1980)
- 17 January – Watch This Space (1980)
- 6 February – God's Wonderful Railway (1980)
- 28 February – Sweet Nothings (1980)
- 1 March – Holocaust (1978)
- 2 March – The History of Mr Polly (1980)
- 17 April – Taxi (1978–1983)
- 18 March – Time of My Life (1980)
- 13 April – The Swish of the Curtain (1980)
- 25 April – The Sun Trap (1980)
- 26 April – Knots Landing (1979–1993)
- 27 April – Buccaneer (1980)
- 29 April – Hannah (1980)
- 11 May – Doom Castle (1980)
- 24 May – The Adventure Game (1980–1986)
- 1 June – Coming Home (1980)
- 12 June – Square Mile of Murder (1980)
- 6 August – Golden Soak (1980)
- 30 August – Juliet Bravo (1980–1985)
- 3 September – Oh Happy Band! (1980)
- 4 September – Mackenzie (1980)
- 8 September – Watchdog (1980–present)
- 13 September – Romie-0 and Julie-8 (1979)
- 1 October – King Rollo (1980)
- 5 October – A Tale of Two Cities (1980)
- 13 October – The Amazing Adventures of Morph (1980–1981)
- 14 October – Forgive Our Foolish Ways (1980)
- 15 October
  - Stone (1980)
  - Nice Work (1980)
- 17 October – To Serve Them All My Days (1980–1981)
- 11 November – The Waterfall (1980)
- 17 November – Spine Chillers (1980)
- 19 November – A Little Silver Trumpet (1980)
- 21 November – Children in Need (1980–present)
- 30 November – The Talisman (1980)
- 4 December – Sink or Swim (1980–1982)
- 9 December – The Flipside of Dominick Hide (1980)
- 23 December – The Bells of Astercote (1980)
- 29 December – The Devil and Daniel Mouse (1978)

=== BBC2 ===
- 7 January – Training Dogs the Woodhouse Way (1980)
- 8 January – Company and Co (1980)
- 13 January – Pride and Prejudice (1980)
- 28 January – Newsnight (1980–present)
- 25 February – Yes Minister (1980–1984 1986–1988 as Yes, Prime Minister)
- 12 March – Therese Raquin (1980)
- 25 March – A Question of Guilt (1980)
- 15 April – The Enigma Files (1980)
- 7 May – 'Tis Pity She's a Whore (1980)
- 1 September – Wainwright's Law (1980)
- 10 September – We, the Accused (1980)
- 12 September – Escape (1980)
- 29 October – Oppenheimer (1980)
- 30 October – Great Railway Journeys of the World (1980; 1994)
- 1 November – Did You See...? (1980–1993)
- 20 November – Dr. Jekyll and Mr. Hyde (1980)
- 2 December – Ireland: A Television History (1980–1981)
- 28 December – Maria Marten or Murder in the Red Barn (1980)

=== ITV ===
- 6 January
  - Shillingbury Tales (1980–1981)
  - Family Fortunes (1980–1985, 1987–2002, 2006–2015, 2020–present)
- 7 January – Keep It in the Family (1980–1983)
- 8 January – Hollywood (1980)
- 24 January – Together (1980–1981)
- 26 January – Hart to Hart (1979–1984)
- 27 January
  - Pig in the Middle (1980–1983)
  - The Spoils of War (1980–1981)
- 1 February – Play Your Cards Right (1980–1987, 1994–1999, 2002–2003)
- 11 February – Jukes of Piccadilly (1980)
- 18 February – Rushton's Illustrated (1980)
- 19 February
  - Take the High Road (1980–2003)
  - The Hard Way (1980)
- 2 March – The Further Adventures of Oliver Twist (1980)
- 4 March – Ffalabalam (1980–1989) (HTV Cymru only, later moved to S4C)
- 10 March – Fox (1980)
- 12 March – The Setbacks (1980–1986)
- 22 March – Bloody Kids (1980)
- 30 March – Why Didn't They Ask Evans? (1980)
- 2 April – Noah's Castle (1980)
- 9 April – Death of a Princess (1980)
- 11 April – The Gentle Touch (1980–1984)
- 12 April – Russ Abbot's Madhouse (1980–1985)
- 13 April – Cribb (1980–1981)
- 14 April
  - Against the Wind (1978)
  - Young at Heart (1980–1982)
- 17 April – The Nesbitts Are Coming (1980)
- 1 May – For Maddie with Love (1980–1981)
- 6 May – Cockleshell Bay (1980–1986)
- 30 May – The Other 'Arf (1980–1986)
- 31 May – Fun Factory (1980)
- 2 June
  - The Latchkey Children (1980)
  - Can We Get on Now, Please? (1980)
- 25 June – Maggie's Moor (1980)
- 2 July – Sounding Brass (1980)
- 14 July – Grundy (1980)
- 20 July – Lady Killers (1980–1981)
- 10 August – Watch All Night (1980)
- 12 August – The Square Leopard (1980)
- 30 August – Buck Rogers in the 25th Century (1979–1982)
- 1 September – Just Liz (1980)
- 2 September
  - Arthur C. Clarke's Mysterious World (1980)
  - Cooper's Half Hour (1980)
- 3 September – Cowboys (1980–1981)
- 4 September – Battlestar Galactica (1978–1979)
- 5 September – Holding the Fort (1980–1982)
- 6 September – Metal Mickey (1980–1983)
- 13 September – Hammer House of Horror (1980)
- 17 September – Flickers (1980)
- 24 September – Munch Bunch (1980–1982)
- 28 September – Nobody's Perfect (1980–1982)
- 1 October – The Squad (1980)
- 19 October – Blade on the Feather (1980)
- 23 October – The Glamour Girls (1980)
- 24 October – Fancy Wanders (1980)
- 26 October – Rain on the Roof (1980)
- 29 October – Love in a Cold Climate (1980)
- 2 November – Cream in My Coffee (1980)
- 14 November – The Good Companions (1980)
- 24 November – Diff'rent Strokes (1978–1986)
- 8 December – Button Moon (1980–1988)
- 17 December – Secombe with Music (1980–1982)
- 25 December – Janet and Company (1980–1982)
- 26 December – An Audience with... (1980–2013)
- 28 December
  - Drake's Venture (1980)
  - Staying On (1980)
- 30 December – Take a Chance (1980–1981)
- 31 December – Brendon Chase (1980–1981)
- Unknown – Aubrey (1980)

== Continuing television shows ==
=== 1920s ===
- BBC Wimbledon (1927–1939, 1946–2019, 2021–present)

=== 1930s ===
- Trooping the Colour (1937–1939, 1946–2019, 2023–present)
- The Boat Race (1938–1939, 1946–2019, 2021–present)
- BBC Cricket (1939, 1946–1999, 2020–2024)

=== 1950s ===
- Come Dancing (1950–1998)
- The Good Old Days (1953–1983)
- Panorama (1953–present)
- Crackerjack (1955–1984, 2020–present)
- What the Papers Say (1956–2008)
- The Sky at Night (1957–present)
- Blue Peter (1958–present)
- Grandstand (1958–2007)

=== 1960s ===
- Coronation Street (1960–present)
- Songs of Praise (1961–present)
- Animal Magic (1962–1983)
- Doctor Who (1963–1989, 2005–present)
- World in Action (1963–1998)
- Top of the Pops (1964–2006)
- Match of the Day (1964–present)
- Crossroads (1964–1988, 2001–2003)
- Play School (1964–1988)
- Mr. and Mrs. (1965–1999)
- World of Sport (1965–1985)
- Jackanory (1965–1996, 2006)
- Sportsnight (1965–1997)
- Call My Bluff (1965–2005)
- It's a Knockout (1966–1982, 1999–2001)
- The Money Programme (1966–2010)
- ITV Playhouse (1967–1982)
- Reksio (1967–1990)
- The Morecambe & Wise Show (1968–1977, 1978–1983)
- The Big Match (1968–2002)
- Nationwide (1969–1983)
- Screen Test (1969–1984)

=== 1970s ===
- The Goodies (1970–1982)
- The Old Grey Whistle Test (1971–1987)
- The Two Ronnies (1971–1987, 1991, 1996, 2005)
- Clapperboard (1972–1982)
- Crown Court (1972–1984)
- Pebble Mill at One (1972–1986, 1991–1996)
- Rainbow (1972–1992, 1994–1997)
- Emmerdale (1972–present)
- Newsround (1972–present)
- Weekend World (1972–1988)
- Pipkins (1973–1981)
- We Are the Champions (1973–1987)
- Last of the Summer Wine (1973–2010)
- That's Life! (1973–1994)
- It Ain't Half Hot Mum (1974–1981)
- Tiswas (1974–1982)
- Wish You Were Here...? (1974–2003)
- Arena (1975–present)
- Jim'll Fix It (1975–1994)
- Gambit (1975–1985, 1995)
- The Muppet Show (1976–1981)
- When the Boat Comes In (1976–1981)
- Multi-Coloured Swap Shop (1976–1982)
- Rentaghost (1976–1984)
- One Man and His Dog (1976–present)
- Robin's Nest (1977–1981)
- You're Only Young Twice (1977–1981)
- The Professionals (1977–1983)
- Blake's 7 (1978–1981)
- Ski Sunday (1978–present)
- Strangers (1978–1982)
- Butterflies (1978–1983, 2000)
- 3-2-1 (1978–1988)
- Grange Hill (1978–2008)
- Agony (1979–1981)
- Something Else (1979–1981)
- To the Manor Born (1979–1981, 2007)
- Worzel Gummidge (1979–1981)
- Dick Turpin (1979–1982)
- Friday Night, Saturday Morning (1979–1982)
- Not the Nine O'Clock News (1979–1982)
- Only When I Laugh (1979–1982)
- Sapphire & Steel (1979–1982)
- Terry and June (1979–1987)
- The Book Tower (1979–1989)
- Blankety Blank (1979–1990, 1997–2002)
- The Paul Daniels Magic Show (1979–1994)
- Antiques Roadshow (1979–present)
- Question Time (1979–present)

== Ending this year ==
- 21 January – Jamie and the Magic Torch (1977–1980)
- 25 March – Leave it to Charlie (1978–1980)
- 6 June – Magpie (1968–1980)
- 22 June – The 607080 Show (1975–1980)
- 7 August – The Cuckoo Waltz (1975–1980)
- 26 October – The Onedin Line (1971–1980)
- 21 December – Shoestring (1979–1980)
- 25 December – Thunderbirds (1972–1980, 1984–1987)
- 31 December – Citizen Smith (1977–1980)
  Tom Sawyer (1980)

== Births ==
- 31 January – Clarissa Ward, television journalist
- 29 February – George Young, actor
- 6 March – Shaun Evans, actor
- 24 March – Amanda Davies, sportscaster
- 8 April – Ben Freeman, actor
- 23 April – Sally Bretton, actress
- 30 April – Sam Heughan, actor
- 12 May – Rishi Sunak, politician
- 22 May – Lucy Gordon, actress and model (died 2009)
- 1 June – Oliver James, actor
- 4 June – Philip Olivier, actor
- 22 June – Charlene White, television presenter and newsreader
- 17 July – Brett Goldstein, actor and comedian
- 18 July – Tasmin Lucia-Khan, journalist and news presenter
- 23 August – Joanne Froggatt, actress
- 1 September – Lara Pulver, actress
- 6 September – Kerry Katona, television presenter, actress and singer
- 19 November – Adele Silva, actress
- 30 November – Tom Basden, actor and scriptwriter
- 5 December – Cherry Healey, television presenter
- 25 December – Laura Sadler, television actress (died 2003)

== Deaths ==
Date	Name	Age	Cinematic Credibility
9 January	Charles Curran	58	television executive
24 January	Sam Leitch	52	television presenter
25 January	Queenie Watts	56	actress
4 February	David Whitaker	51	television screenwriter
8 February	Leslie Welch	72	television entertainer
9 February	Heron Carvic	67	actor
9 February	Renée Houston	77	actress
24 March	John Barrie	62	actor
31 March	John Nightingale	37	actor
1 April	Joyce Heron	63	actress
11 April	Nicholas Phipps	66	actor
15 April	Catherine Salkeld	70	actress
26 April	Cicely Courtneidge	87	actress
14 May	Hugh Griffith	67	film, stage and television actor
23 June	John Laurie	83	actor (Dad's Army)
24 July	Peter Sellers	54	comic actor (Inspector Clouseau in The Pink Panther)
21 August	Norman Shelley	77	actor
24 August	Yootha Joyce	53	actor (Man About the House, George and Mildred)
19 September	Jacky Gillott	40	television presenter
6 October	Hattie Jacques	58	comic actress
12 October	Ambrosine Phillpotts	68	actress
20 October	Isobel Barnett	62	broadcast personality (What's My Line?)
29 October	Ouida MacDermott	91	actress
3 November	Dennis Burgess	54	actor
8 November	Julian Wintle	67	television producer
9 November	Patrick Campbell	67	television personality (Call My Bluff)
16 November	Imogen Hassall	38	actress
26 November	Rachel Roberts	53	actress
26 November	Hector Ross	66	actor
25 December	Fred Emney	78	actor and comedian

== See also ==
- 1980 in British music
- 1980 in British radio
- 1980 in the United Kingdom
- List of British films of 1980
