= 1980 in British radio =

This is a list of events in British radio during 1980.

== Events ==
=== January ===
- 2 January – BBC Radio 3 launches a new, extended teatime programme Mainly for Pleasure. The two-hour long programme replaces the much shorter Homeward Bound.
- 13 January – Forces request programme Family Favourites is broadcast on BBC Radio 2 for the final time.

=== February ===
- BBC Radio Wales launches the first of two permanent community opt-out stations, Radio Deeside, after successful community radio experiments in 1978. The reopening is in response to the closure of the Shotton steelworks.

=== March ===
- 19–20 March – MV Mi Amigo, the ship from which the pirate radio station Radio Caroline is broadcast, runs aground and sinks off the Thames Estuary.
- 31 March – BBC Radio 1's broadcast hours are cut back. The station starts broadcasting on weekdays an hour later and Saturday evening programming ends. The station simulcasts BBC Radio 2 during this additional downtime although by the end of the year Radio 1 has stopped broadcasting Radio 2 through the night.

=== April ===
- 11 April – CBC in Cardiff becomes the first of the second tranche of Independent Local Radio stations to start broadcasting. It is the first new ILR station since 1976.

=== May ===
- 30 May – The final edition of soap opera Waggoners' Walk is broadcast on BBC Radio 2.

=== June to August ===
- No events.

=== September ===
- September – Due to the continued expansion of BBC Local Radio, the regional news bulletins, broadcast in England four times a day Monday to Saturday on BBC Radio 4, end, apart from in the south west which is the sole part of England which still does not have any BBC local service.

=== October ===
- 18 October – Radio Tay begins broadcasting to the Dundee area from the Angus transmitter.

=== November ===
- 14 November – Radio Tay begins broadcasting to the Perth area.
- 15 November – The very last episode of BBC Radio 4 sketch comedy show The Burkiss Way, "Wave Goodbye to CBEs the Burkiss Way", lampoons what the writers considered to be the BBC's obsequious approach to the Queen Mother's 80th birthday celebrations, and its first repeat transmission is cut by 6 minutes on the instructions of the station controller.

=== December ===
- 1 December – BBC Scotland carries out a one-week experiment in breakfast television. It is a simulcast of BBC Radio Scotland's breakfast show Good Morning Scotland.
- 6 December – Andy Peebles records an in-depth interview with John Lennon in New York City for BBC Radio 1, two days before Lennon's murder.

=== Undated ===
- Autumn – Land-based pirate radio station Dread Broadcasting Corporation begins to air from West London as Britain's first black music "pirate" station.

== Station debuts ==
- February – BBC Radio Deeside
- 11 April – CBC (Cardiff Broadcasting Company)
- 23 May – Mercia Sound
- 10 July – Hereward Radio
- 11 September – BBC Radio Norfolk
- 15 September – 2CR (Two Counties Radio)
- Autumn – Dread Broadcasting Corporation
- 17 October – Radio Tay
- 23 October – Severn Sound
- 7 November – DevonAir Radio
- 11 November – BBC Radio Lincolnshire

== Programme debuts ==
- 8 April – Radio Active on BBC Radio 4 (1980–1987)
- 8 October – The Senior Partner on BBC Radio 4 (1980–1981)
- 25 November – Hordes of the Things on BBC Radio 4 (1980)

== Continuing radio programmes ==
=== 1940s ===
- Sunday Half Hour (1940–2018)
- Desert Island Discs (1942–Present)
- Down Your Way (1946–1992)
- Letter from America (1946–2004)
- Woman's Hour (1946–Present)
- A Book at Bedtime (1949–Present)

=== 1950s ===
- The Archers (1950–Present)
- The Today Programme (1957–Present)
- Sing Something Simple (1959–2001)
- Your Hundred Best Tunes (1959–2007)

=== 1960s ===
- Farming Today (1960–Present)
- In Touch (1961–Present)
- The World at One (1965–Present)
- The Official Chart (1967–Present)
- Just a Minute (1967–Present)
- The Living World (1968–Present)
- The Organist Entertains (1969–2018)

=== 1970s ===
- PM (1970–Present)
- Start the Week (1970–Present)
- Week Ending (1970–1998)
- You and Yours (1970–Present)
- I'm Sorry I Haven't a Clue (1972–Present)
- Good Morning Scotland (1973–Present)
- Kaleidoscope (1973–1998)
- Newsbeat (1973–Present)
- The News Huddlines (1975–2001)
- File on 4 (1977–Present)
- Money Box (1977–Present)
- The News Quiz (1977–Present)
- Breakaway (1979–1998)
- Feedback (1979–Present)
- The Food Programme (1979–Present)
- Science in Action (1979–Present)

== Ending this year ==
- 13 January – Family Favourites (1945–1980)
- 30 May – Waggoners' Walk (1969–1980)
- 15 November – The Burkiss Way (1976–1980)

== Births ==
- February – Sara Mohr-Pietsch, classical music presenter
- 6 February – Tom Ravenscroft, radio DJ
- 28 February – Katy Wix, Welsh comedy actres
- 22 April – Helen Zaltzman, podcaster, broadcaster and scriptwriter
- 7 May – Kate Lawler, reality TV personality, DJ and model
- 3 June – Rickie Haywood-Williams, radio DJ and TV presenter
- 4 June
  - Nii Odartei Evans, radio announcer and voice actor
  - Danielle Perry, radio presenter and musician
- 30 July – Melvin Odoom, radio DJ and TV presenter/comedian
- 5 August – Sophie Winkleman, Lady Frederick Windsor, actress
- 3 November – Elis James, Welsh comedian
- Unknown – Joe Sims, actor and radio presenter

== Deaths ==
- 9 February – Renée Houston, actress (The Clitheroe Kid) (born 1902)
- 26 April – Dame Cicely Courtneidge, actress (Discord in Three Flats) (born 1893)
- 4 May – Joe "Mr Piano" Henderson, Scottish pianist, composer and broadcaster (born 1920)
- 23 June – John Laurie, actor (The Man Born to Be King) (born 1897)
- 24 July – Peter Sellers, actor, comedian and radio personality (born 1925)
- 22 August – Norman Shelley, actor (born 1903)
- 6 October – Hattie Jacques, actress (Educating Archie, Hancock's Half Hour) (born 1922)
- 19 October – D. G. Bridson, radio producer and author (born 1910)
- 20 October – Isobel Barnett, broadcasting personality (born 1918; suicide)
- 8 December – Charles Parker, documentary producer (born 1919)

== See also ==
- 1980 in British music
- 1980 in British television
- 1980 in the United Kingdom
- List of British films of 1980
