= IMO Records =

- Type: Private
- Founded: 1998
- Founder: Jason Robertson (DJ Spinback)
- Products: Vinyl records, electronic music (dubstep, drum and bass, hardcore), clothing, DJ equipment
- Services: Online retail, music download store (former)
- Owner: Robertson of London Limited

IMO Records is an online retailer of vinyl and electronic dubstep, drum and bass, and hardcore dance music. The firm also sells clothing, DJ equipment, and ancillary products.

IMO Records was established in 1998 as a mail order business and record shop, now closed, by Jason Robertson, who was better known as DJ Spinback. Robertson was a hardcore disk jockey and music producer from Surrey who was closely associated with the London pirate radio station Dream FM (1994 to 1997/98) which was so successful that it was able to host its own rave parties. Robertson also DJ'd on Kiss FM.

Today, IMO Records is based in Wimbledon, South London, and is a trading name of Robertson of London Limited, a company incorporated on 20 June 2000. Jason Robertson was the first director of the firm, however, he resigned in August 2010 since when Martin Hamblin has been the sole Director. In October 2012 the company was listed in the London Gazette for striking-off the register at Companies House, however, the striking-off action was discontinued in November that year when outstanding requirements were satisfied.

In 2012 IMO began to offer digital downloads of music from their site, partnering with the digital label services of companies like Label Worx and TuneDome. However, IMO Records closed their download store at the end of 2014.
