= Ben Bartlett =

British composer (1965–2026)

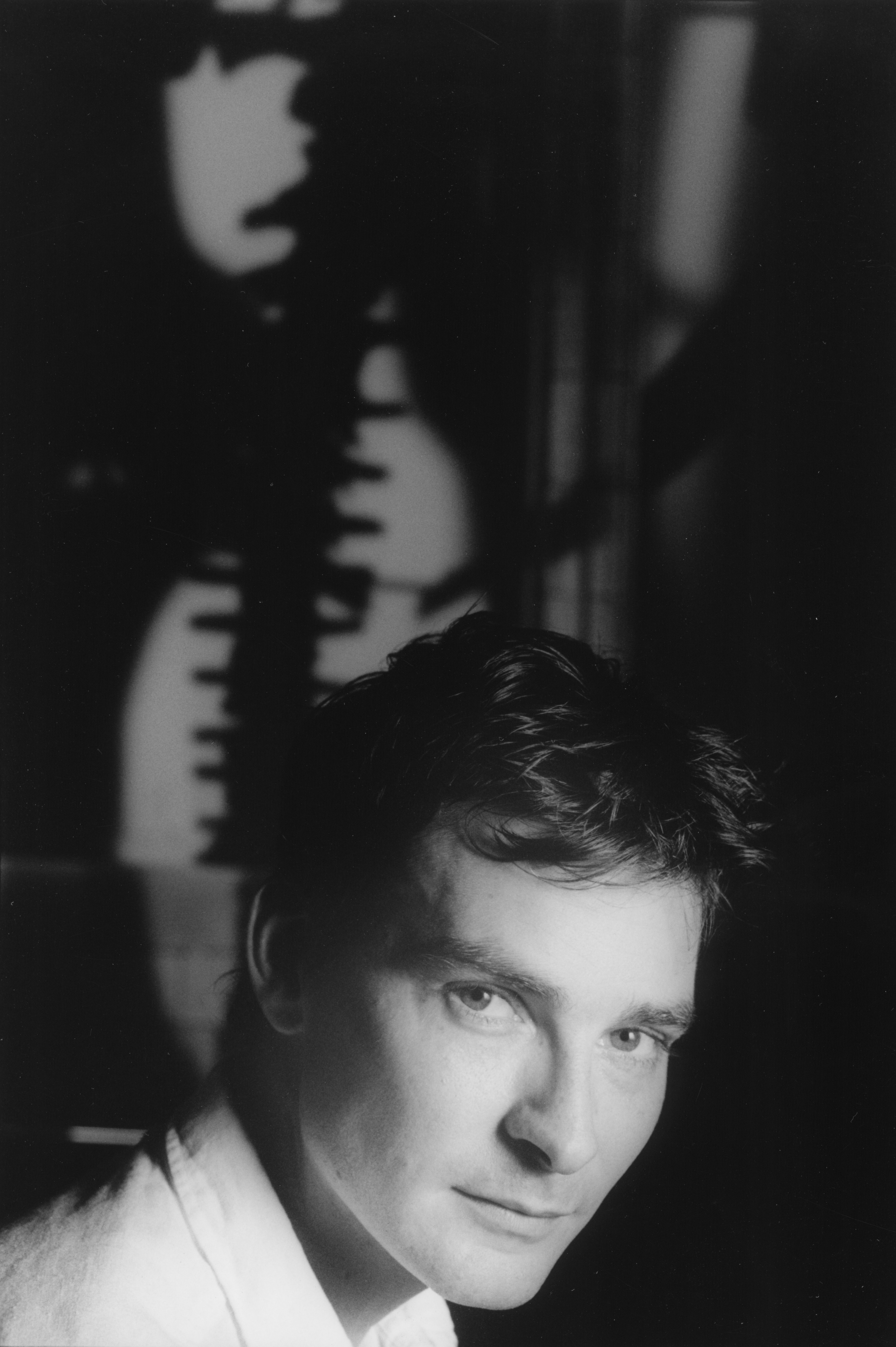
Ben Bartlett in 2001

Ben Bartlett (March 17, 1965 – 19 April 2026) was a British composer. He is known for film and television scores, including Walking with Dinosaurs, Vera, The Tunnel and Lucky Man.

== Background ==
Working and living in London, Ben Bartlett was educated there, attending Westminster City grammar school, and Pimlico Comprehensive Special Music School. He received piano tuition under the noted concert pianist Albert Ferber. Bartlett read music at Royal Holloway College, London University, where he rubbed shoulders with the drama department, discovering composition for theatre. Bartlett was commissioned by the College, whilst a student, to compose and direct a musical celebrating the centenary of Royal Holloway College, performed on site in 1986 by the drama and music departments. He later studied composition at Guildhall School of Music and Drama, where he won the Lutoslawski prize for composition. Bartlett was busy composing music for television commercials when he met Tim Haines and the BBC team devising a pioneering documentary combining 3D animated dinosaurs and 35mm film: Walking with Dinosaurs.

== Screen music ==
Bartlett first came into prominence with his score for Walking with Dinosaurs in 1999, for which he won a British Academy Television Craft Award in 2000 and was nominated for a Primetime Emmy Award in the same year. Bartlett has received several other award nominations including an Ivor Novello nomination for his score for BBC Scotland's TV film Fiona's Story, and several RTS nominations for his music for screen including the film The Mark Of Cain directed by Marc Munden.

He is also known for his music to the ITV Series Vera, airing to audiences in excess of 6 million. Bartlett's music has been heard on the Sky 1 hit series Stan Lee's Lucky Man; the ITV series The Loch, as well as the Kudos production for Sky Atlantic, The Tunnel. Bartlett has also worked on the ITV drama The Trials Of Jimmy Rose directed by Adrian Shergold, with whom Bartlett also collaborated on the 3-part TV epic He Kills Coppers based on the Jake Arnot novel.

== Concert music ==
Debuting as a pianist at The Purcell Room aged 14, Bartlett went on to receive critical acclaim for his mini-opera El Tigre, a setting for chamber ensemble and mezzo soprano of the Pablo Neruda poem of the same name. Premiered at the 1995 season of the Covent Garden Festival, and performed at the Donmar Warehouse, Covent Garden, the Hispanic/Latin influenced fusion of flamenco, tango and opera was conducted by Charles Hazlewood and performed by Maria Koripas. Bartlett composed his suite for string orchestra Nine, based on fragments of Ravel's String Quartet, performed at Leighton House Museum by the Dallapicolla Ensemble under the baton of Luigi Suvini. Bartlett's piano music was performed at the Queen Elizabeth Hall by Louis Alvanis, and the Piano Trio Three was performed at St Martins In The Field by the Chamber Music Company under Mark Troop. Bartlett was later commissioned to write for The Dancer On The Point Of Being Undressed performed at The Place in London, UK.

== Other activities ==
Bartlett was in demand as a speaker in Australia, Germany and UK, and was invited to lecture at the Royal College of Music, Leeds Conservatoire Of Music and the National Film and Television School UK. Bartlett was in demand as a judge on the BAFTA and Ivor Novello awards panels on several occasions.

== Death ==
Bartlett died from lung cancer on 19 April 2026 at the age of 61.

== Awards ==
- 2000 – Winner of the British Academy Television Craft Award in the category "Best Original Television Music", for Walking with Dinosaurs (1999).
- 2000 – Primetime Emmy Award nomination in the category "Outstanding Music Composition for a Miniseries, Movie or a Special", for Walking with Dinosaurs (1999)
- 2006 – RTS nomination for "Music – Original Title" for TV series The Ghost Squad (2005)
- 2007 – RTS nomination for "Music – Original Score" for The Mark Of Cain (2007) movie
- 2009 – Ivor Novello Award nomination for "Best Television Soundtrack" for BBC film Fiona's Story (2008)
- 2009 – RTS nomination for "Music – Original Title" for TV series Mutual Friends (2008)
