= The Trials of Jimmy Rose =

Television series

- Genre: Crime drama
- Written by: Alan Whiting
- Directed by: Adrian Shergold
- Starring: Ray Winstone; Amanda Redman; John Lynch; Paul Jesson; Tom Cullen; Mel Raido
- Composer: Ben Bartlett
- Country of origin: United Kingdom
- Original language: English
- No. of series: 1
- No. of episodes: 3

Production
- Executive producer: Kieran Roberts
- Producer: Jane Dauncey
- Running time: 45 minutes
- Production companies: ITV Studios; Motion Content Group

Original release
- Network: ITV
- Release: 30 August – 13 September 2015

The Trials of Jimmy Rose is a British crime drama television miniseries, starring Ray Winstone as protagonist Jimmy Rose, an ex-convict and businessman who tries to go straight after being released from prison on licence. The series also stars Amanda Redman, John Lynch and Paul Jesson as Jimmy's wife, her lover and his brother, respectively. The series premiered on 30 August 2015. The DVD of the first series was released on 14 September 2015.

== Plot ==
Jimmy Rose (Ray Winstone), a long-term convict and criminal, is released on parole after serving twelve years in prison for armed robbery. When he returns home, he finds his wife, Jackie (Amanda Redman) is co-habiting with another man; his son, Joe (Tom Cullen) refuses to even speak to him; and his grand-daughter, Ellie (Montanna Thompson), has become addicted to drugs and is now working as a courier for gangland criminals Mehmet Guzman and Tony Chivers. Jimmy decides to turn his back on going straight to save his granddaughter from the clutches of the evil world of drugs while trying to rebuild his family at the same time.

== Cast ==
- Ray Winstone as Jimmy Rose, a former convict who is out on parole licence after serving twelve years for armed robbery
- Amanda Redman as Jackie Rose, Jimmy's long-suffering wife
- John Lynch as DI Steve McIntyre, Jackie's lover who convinces Jimmy to turn informant
- Paul Jesson as Roy Anderson, Jimmy's brother
- Marion Bailey as Sue Anderson, Roy's wife and Jimmy's sister-in-law
- Tom Cullen as Joe Rose, Jimmy's estranged son who refuses to have anything to do with him
- Leticia Dolera as Maria Rose, Joe's wife
- Pippa Bennett-Warner as Kerry Irwin, Jimmy's probation officer
- Montanna Thompson as Ellie Rose, Jimmy's drug-addicted granddaughter
- Mel Raido as Tony Chivers, gangland associate and drug dealer
- Akin Gazi as Mehmet Guzman, gangland associate and drug dealer

== Episode list ==
No.	Title	Directed by	Written by	British air date	UK viewers (million)
1	"Episode 1"	Adrian Shergold	Alan Whiting	30 August 2015	4.40
After twelve years in prison for armed robbery, sixty-one year old Jimmy Rose returns home to a mixed reception. While daughter Julie and grandson Elliot are pleased to see him, his wife Jackie, weary of being a prison widow, is distant and sister-in-law Sue wants to keep her husband Roy away from Jimmy. Most hostile of all is estranged son Joe, who blames Jimmy's absence for grand-daughter Ellie's leaving home and becoming a drug addict. Accepting a dull job in a DIY store as part of his parole licence, Jimmy jeopardises it by tracking down Ellie, who is under the influence of boyfriend Aaron. Jimmy destroys Aaron's heroin supply, but his attempt to confront the drug dealers operating from a Pizza This takeaway leads to his being beaten up and dumped in the street.
2	"Episode 2"	Adrian Shergold	Alan Whiting	6 September 2015	4.22
Discharged from hospital, Jimmy discovers that Pizza This owner Guzman is in collusion with Tony Chivers, a gangster and old enemy of Jimmy's, who warns him to stay away from Guzman. While Jimmy is keeping a vigil at Ellie's flat, Jackie's car is blown up and policeman Steve McIntyre investigates. However, Jimmy is to learn that Steve was Jackie's lover when he was in prison, and he walks out on her - much to the delight of Sue. Jimmy persuades Joe to take in Ellie, but she disappears - and when Jimmy catches up with her, she is with the severely beaten Aaron. As a result of Jimmy trashing their heroin, the youngsters owe Guzman £20,000, and Joe is not convinced when his father tells him about the outwardly respectable Guzman's criminal secret. After telling Jackie to start divorce proceedings so that she can marry Steve, Jimmy goes to see Chivers, declaring that he will work for him to pay off the drugs debt.
3	"Episode 3"	Adrian Shergold	Alan Whiting & Dom Shaw	13 September 2015	3.53
In exchange for the youngsters' drug debt being written off, Jimmy agrees to an assignment for Chivers, though he refuses to carry a gun. The family is more cordial towards him after he has saved Roy, who has had a heart attack, but a concerned Jackie persuades Steve to ask Jimmy to be an informant on the drug dealers. Jimmy is not easily convinced, but he does speak with Steve. That night, he joins Chivers for the crucial deal - robbing a rival gang, which goes according to plan. However, Jimmy has to prove whether he will cooperate with Steve and Jackie, and also has a decision to make regarding her future.
