= Jazzy M =

British DJ and record producer

Michael Schiniou, known professionally by his stage name Jazzy M, is a British DJ and record producer. He was influential in introducing house music to Britain in the 1980s, and has been described as the Godfather of UK House (a nickname given to him by fellow DJ Grooverider).

Schiniou has also released music and performed under the pseudonyms Klubzone 1, Sao Paulo, Dub Nation, Zoogie, Erotic World, J+M Connection, RipJazz, Bernard and Phillip, JZJ, and Bushbaby.

== Biography ==
=== Early life ===
Schiniou was born in London in 1962. He studied at Kingston University.

=== Career ===
Schiniou began his professional interest in music after taking a weekend job in record shop Shady Deals. He has described being influenced by Prog rock, punk, P-funk, disco, jazz, latin, and R+B soul music in his teens. He began DJing aged 17. His first radio spot was on pirate radio station Radio Fulham, at that time performing as DJ Mick.

In the mid-1980s Schiniou began hosting The Jackin' Zone on pirate LWR, which was the first dedicated electronic and house music programme on UK radio. Jazzy M was the first DJ to play at the Ministry of Sound nightclub, going on to be resident DJ there for a record 15 years. He has worked in, run, or owned a number of record shops over the years, including Spin Offs and Vinyl Zone.

Later in his career, Schiniou turned to record production, running labels OhZone, Delphinus Delphius, Red Giant Recordings, Spankin Records, Le Plug Rouge, and Who Killed Disco?, later now with Chasing Rabbits and Ohzone VIP. In this capacity he launched the career of Orbital, plus others such as Richie Rich.
