= Point Blank Radio =

- England
- Broadcast area: London
- Frequencies: 10C DAB (Surrey, South London)

Programming
- Format: House music, techno, garage, soul, jazz, world

History
- First air date: November 1994 (pirate station); June 2021 (DAB)

Links
- Website: pointblankradio.com

Point Blank Radio also known as Point Blank DAB is a London-based DAB and online radio station specialising in house music and other forms of classic and contemporary electronic music, with shows also focusing on a wider range of genres such as soul, jazz and world music.

Point Blank first broadcast in 1994 as a pirate radio station from Slough.

In April 2021, it was announced that the station would soon join the Surrey DAB Mux. It commenced licensed broadcasting on 26 June 2021.
