= Dream FM (Leeds) =

Dream FM Leeds
- England
- Broadcast area: Leeds, West Yorkshire, England
- Frequency: 99.9 FM / 107.8 FM / 104.9 FM

Programming
- Format: House, techno, trance, soul, jazz-funk, hip hop, breakbeat hardcore, jungle

History
- First air date: October 1992

Dream FM was a 1990s pirate radio station based in Leeds, West Yorkshire, that played a diverse range of dance music and was renowned for its professional style. It first broadcast on 104.9 FM in October 1992, changing to a simulcast on 99.9 FM then settling on FM 99.9 until early 1994 when it moved to 107.8 FM and could be received throughout Yorkshire.

In 1995, Dream launched a campaign to become a legal station. The ITV Yorkshire current affairs series Edit V featured the station during this time. Despite a petition and public support, Dream would not secure a licence and instead one was awarded to Kiss 105. Dream was last heard around November 1995.

DJs and presenters on the station included Paul Taylor, Shock, Daisy & Havoc, Tantra Countdown, Tony Walker, Chris Martin, DJ Chana, Marc Leaf, Mark Dawson, DJ Gilly, Carl Whitehead, and Steve Luigi
