= The Wedding Tackle =

2000 British comedy film by Rami Dvir

- Directed by: Rami Dvir
- Written by: Nigel Horne
- Starring: Leslie Grantham; Tony Slattery; Adrian Dunbar; Amanda Redman; Susan Vidler; James Purefoy
- Cinematography: Shelley Hirst
- Edited by: Mike Latham Matthew Tabern
- Music by: Charles Hodgkinson Kirk Zavieh
- Distributed by: Viking Films
- Release date: 11 August 2000
- Running time: 94 min
- Country: United Kingdom
- Language: English

The Wedding Tackle is a 2000 British comedy film directed by Rami Dvir and starring Leslie Grantham, Tony Slattery, Adrian Dunbar, Amanda Redman, Susan Vidler, and James Purefoy.

== Plot ==
The film primarily takes place over the course of one night. Hal (Purefoy), an over sexed photographer is due to marry Vinni (Vidler) in one week but has cold feet. His friend, Little Ted (Slattery), a scheming, sexually frustrated cartoonist is obsessed with Vinni, even though he dumped her when they went out together. Both Little Ted and Hal have their own plans to disrupt the imminent wedding and they separately call upon Mr. Mac (Dunbar), a world weary swimming coach, to help them out. At Hal's all day stag night, Little Ted sets in motion a disastrous chain of events when he persuades Mr.Mac to convince Petula, (his ex-girlfriend, played by Redman) to seduce Hal in a pub lavatory so that he can record it. As the night unfolds each character's scheme becomes increasingly tangled.

== Reception ==
Derek Elley of Variety gave the film a lukewarm review, describing it as, "a good cast managing to rise above an average script and lackluster direction. Overall, however, pic is a modest item, demanding fast local playoff before disappearing onto half-inch." Keith Perry of the British Film Institute similarly observed, "Debut director and former stage actor Rami Dvir opts for a functional, televisual mise en scène, with an even editing rhythm, shallow rack focusing and flat blocking."

== Soundtrack ==
The soundtrack to The Wedding Tackle

- "I Close My Eyes and Count to Ten" - Performed by Dusty Springfield
- "Girl Don't Come" - Performed by Sandie Shaw
- "Something Tells Me (Something's Gonna Happen Tonight)" - Performed by Cilla Black
- "You've Got Your Troubles" - Performed by The Fortunes
- "Walkin' Back to Happiness" - Performed by Helen Shapiro
- "Long Live Love" - Performed by Sandie Shaw
- "Where Do You Go To (My Lovely)" - Performed by Peter Sarstedt
- "You Were Made for Me" - Performed by Freddie & The Dreamers
- "Lightnin' Strikes" - Performed by Lou Christie
- "Lovesick Blues" - Performed by Frank Ifield
- "Bobby's Girl" - Performed by Susan Maughan
- "Dance On" - Performed by Kathy Kirby
- "The Letter" - Performed by The Box Tops
- "I'm a Tiger" - Performed by Lulu
- "You Don't Have to Say You Love Me" - Performed by Dusty Springfield
- "Puppet on a String" - Performed by Sandie Shaw
- "Boom Bang-a-Bang" - Performed by Lulu
