= Paul Jesson =

English actor

- Born: Hitchin, Hertfordshire, England
- Occupations: Stage and film actor
- Years active: 1971–present

Paul Jesson is an English stage, television and film actor and an Associate Artist of the Royal Shakespeare Company.

He has played leading roles at the National Theatre and the RSC and won the Laurence Olivier Award for Best Actor in a Supporting Role 1986 for his role in The Normal Heart at the Royal Court Theatre. He was nominated for a Scottish Critics' Award 2004 for his portrayal of Willy Loman in Death of a Salesman at the Royal Lyceum, Edinburgh.

He played the Earl of Gloucester in the Donmar Theatre production of King Lear with Derek Jacobi, Maurice Montgomery in Nicholas Wright's Travelling Light at the National Theatre and appeared in Caryl Churchill's Love and Information at the Royal Court (2012).

His recent films include Brutus in Coriolanus directed by and starring Ralph Fiennes, Nae Caranfil's Closer to the Moon and Sir David Hare's Wall.

He played William Turner, father of J. M. W. Turner in Mike Leigh's 2014 film Mr. Turner. He returned to the RSC to play Cardinal Wolsey in Wolf Hall and Bring Up the Bodies at Stratford-upon-Avon, the Aldwych Theatre, London and the Winter Garden Theater on Broadway for which he was nominated for an Outer Critics Circle Award. He played Menenius in the RSC's 2017 production of Coriolanus, Fritz Busch in David Hare's The Moderate Soprano at The Duke of Yorks and Niels Bohr in Michael Frayn's Copenhagen at Chichester Festival Theatre 2018.

Recent television includes The Trials of Jimmy Rose, Chewing Gum, Endeavour, The Trial of Christine Keeler, and The Crown.

He is a visiting tutor at the Guildhall School of Music and Drama.
