= 1980 in British music =

This is a summary of 1980 in music in the United Kingdom, including the official charts from that year.

== Events ==
- unknown date – John Rutter is made an honorary Fellow of Westminster Choir College, Princeton.
- 1 January – Cliff Richard is appointed an MBE by Elizabeth II.
- 16 January – Paul McCartney is arrested in Tokyo for possession of one-half pound (230 g) of marijuana. The remaining part of McCartney's tour has to be cancelled.
- 25 January – Paul McCartney is released from a Japanese jail and ejected from the country by Japanese authorities.
- 8 February – David Bowie and his wife of nearly 10 years, Angie, file for divorce. Bowie gets custody of their nine-year-old son Zowie.
- 30 April – The first performance of the Quartetto Intimo (composed 1930–32) by John Foulds takes place at Hartlebury Castle, performed by the Endellion String Quartet as part of the 1980 Bromsgrove Festival.
- 18 May – Ian Curtis, vocalist of pioneering post-punk group Joy Division, hangs himself in his Macclesfield home. His death comes just days before Joy Division are scheduled to begin their first U.S. tour.
- 14 July – Malcolm Owen of punk rock band the Ruts is found dead in the bathroom of his parents' house in Hayes, from a heroin overdose.
- 22 August – The world premiere of Michael Tippett’s Triple Concerto takes place at the BBC Proms, with the London Symphony Orchestra and soloists György Pauk, Nobuko Imai and Ralph Kirshbaum, conducted by Sir Colin Davis.
- 16 September – Kate Bush becomes the first British female artist to reach number one in the UK album charts.
- 20 September – Ozzy Osbourne's debut album Blizzard of Ozz is released in the UK.
- 25 November – ABBA score the last of their nine number-one singles in the UK singles chart with "Super Trouper".
- December – Duran Duran sign with EMI after finalising their lineup and touring as a support act for Hazel O'Connor.
- 4 December – Led Zeppelin disbands following the death of drummer John Bonham in September.
- 8 December – John Lennon is shot dead outside his apartment building in New York City. His latest single, "(Just Like) Starting Over", subsequently becomes a number-one hit.

== Pop music ==
A varied list of artists reached No. 1 in the UK singles chart in 1980. Kenny Rogers, The Jam and Odyssey were among those vying for the top position. The Guinness Book of British Hit Singles & Albums stated that the year had a very dated appearance, because of a number of songs reaching No. 1 which had been recorded years previously, such as the "Theme from M*A*S*H*" and Don McLean's cover of Roy Orbison's "Crying".

The Ska and Mod revivals reached their peak this year, with strong chart showings by The Jam, The Specials and Madness. 1970s favourites ABBA and Blondie both had their last years as chart heavyweights, clocking up five No.1 singles between them. David Bowie scored his second No.1 this year, while the death of John Lennon at the end of the year gave him his first chart topper (and would dominate the early months of 1981). Kate Bush became the first British female artist to have a No.1 album, and The Police finished the year as the top selling act. "Brass in Pocket" by The Pretenders became the first number 1 single of the 80s (not counting "Another Brick in the Wall" by Pink Floyd" which was a holdover from 1979).

== Charts ==
=== Number-one singles ===
Chart date (week ending)	Song	Artist(s)	Sales
5 January	"Another Brick in the Wall"	Pink Floyd	200,000
12 January	"Another Brick in the Wall"	Pink Floyd	92,000
19 January	"Brass in Pocket"	The Pretenders	76,000
26 January	"Brass in Pocket"	The Pretenders	84,000
2 February	The Special AKA Live!	The Specials	88,000
9 February	The Special AKA Live!	The Specials	109,000
16 February	"Coward of the County"	Kenny Rogers	87,000
23 February	"Coward of the County"	Kenny Rogers	121,000
1 March	"Atomic"	Blondie	115,000
8 March	"Atomic"	Blondie	129,000
15 March	"Together We Are Beautiful"	Fern Kinney	84,000
22 March	"Going Underground" / "Dreams of Children"	The Jam	131,000
29 March	"Going Underground" / "Dreams of Children"	The Jam	124,000
5 April	"Going Underground" / "Dreams of Children"	The Jam	85,000
12 April	"Working My Way Back to You"	The Detroit Spinners	78,000
19 April	"Working My Way Back to You"	The Detroit Spinners	81,000
26 April	"Call Me"	Blondie	82,000
3 May	"Geno"	Dexys Midnight Runners	95,000
10 May	"Geno"	Dexys Midnight Runners	93,000
17 May	"What's Another Year"	Johnny Logan	88,000
24 May	"What's Another Year"	Johnny Logan	83,000
31 May	"Theme from M*A*S*H (Suicide Is Painless)"	The Mash	74,000
7 June	"Theme from M*A*S*H (Suicide Is Painless)"	The Mash	97,000
14 June	"Theme from M*A*S*H (Suicide Is Painless)"	The Mash	88,000
21 June	"Crying"	Don McLean	68,000
28 June	"Crying"	Don McLean	67,000
5 July	"Crying"	Don McLean	59,000
12 July	"Xanadu"	Olivia Newton-John/Electric Light Orchestra	74,000
19 July	"Xanadu"	Olivia Newton-John/Electric Light Orchestra	69,000
26 July	"Use It Up and Wear It Out"	Odyssey	62,000
2 August	"Use It Up and Wear It Out"	Odyssey	76,000
9 August	"The Winner Takes It All"	ABBA	71,000
16 August	"The Winner Takes It All"	ABBA	105,000
23 August	"Ashes to Ashes"	David Bowie	111,000
30 August	"Ashes to Ashes"	David Bowie	109,000
6 September	"Start!"	The Jam	81,000
13 September	"Feels Like I'm in Love"	Kelly Marie	102,000
20 September	"Feels Like I'm in Love"	Kelly Marie	99,000
27 September	"Don't Stand So Close to Me"	The Police	112,000
4 October	"Don't Stand So Close to Me"	The Police	209,000
11 October	"Don't Stand So Close to Me"	The Police	121,000
18 October	"Don't Stand So Close to Me"	The Police	97,000
25 October	"Woman in Love"	Barbra Streisand	91,000
1 November	"Woman in Love"	Barbra Streisand	115,000
8 November	"Woman in Love"	Barbra Streisand	119,000
15 November	"The Tide Is High"	Blondie	110,000
22 November	"The Tide Is High"	Blondie	132,000
29 November	"Super Trouper"	ABBA	121,000
6 December	"Super Trouper"	ABBA	101,000
13 December	"Super Trouper"	ABBA	94,000
20 December	"(Just Like) Starting Over"	John Lennon	148,000
27 December	"There's No One Quite Like Grandma"	St. Winifred's School Choir	165,685

=== Number-one albums ===
Chart date (week ending)	Album	Artist
5 January	Greatest Hits, Vol. 1	Rod Stewart
12 January	Greatest Hits Vol. 2	ABBA
19 January	Pretenders	The Pretenders
26 January	Pretenders	The Pretenders
2 February	Pretenders	The Pretenders
9 February	Pretenders	The Pretenders
16 February	Last Dance	Various artists
23 February	Last Dance	Various artists
1 March	String of Hits	The Shadows
8 March	String of Hits	The Shadows
15 March	String of Hits	The Shadows
22 March	Tears and Laughter	Johnny Mathis
29 March	Tears and Laughter	Johnny Mathis
5 April	Duke	Genesis
12 April	Duke	Genesis
19 April	Greatest Hits	Rose Royce
26 April	Greatest Hits	Rose Royce
3 May	Sky 2	Sky
10 May	Sky 2	Sky
17 May	The Magic of Boney M. – 20 Golden Hits	Boney M.
24 May	The Magic of Boney M. – 20 Golden Hits	Boney M.
31 May	McCartney II	Paul McCartney
7 June	McCartney II	Paul McCartney
14 June	Peter Gabriel	Peter Gabriel
21 June	Peter Gabriel	Peter Gabriel
28 June	Flesh and Blood	Roxy Music
5 July	Emotional Rescue	The Rolling Stones
12 July	Emotional Rescue	The Rolling Stones
19 July	The Game	Queen
26 July	The Game	Queen
2 August	Deepest Purple	Deep Purple
9 August	Back in Black	AC/DC
16 August	Back in Black	AC/DC
23 August	Flesh + Blood	Roxy Music
30 August	Flesh + Blood	Roxy Music
6 September	Flesh + Blood	Roxy Music
13 September	Telekon	Gary Numan
20 September	Never for Ever	Kate Bush
27 September	Scary Monsters (And Super Creeps)	David Bowie
4 October	Scary Monsters (And Super Creeps)	David Bowie
11 October	Zenyatta Mondatta	The Police
18 October	Zenyatta Mondatta	The Police
25 October	Zenyatta Mondatta	The Police
1 November	Zenyatta Mondatta	The Police
8 November	Guilty	Barbra Streisand
15 November	Guilty	Barbra Streisand
22 November	Super Trouper	ABBA
29 November	Super Trouper	ABBA
6 December	Super Trouper	ABBA
13 December	Super Trouper	ABBA
20 December	Super Trouper	ABBA
27 December	Super Trouper	ABBA

== Year-end charts ==
The tables below include sales between 31 December 1979 and 31 December 1980: the year-end charts reproduced in the issue of Music Week dated 27 December 1980 and played on Radio 1 on 4 January 1981 only include sales figures up until 6 December 1980.

=== Best-selling singles ===
No.	Title	Artist	Peak position
1	"Don't Stand So Close to Me"	The Police	1
2	"Woman in Love"	Barbra Streisand	1
3	"Feels Like I'm in Love"	Kelly Marie	1
4	"Super Trouper"	ABBA	1
5	"D.I.S.C.O."	Ottawan	2
6	"The Tide Is High"	Blondie	1
7	"Geno"	Dexys Midnight Runners	1
8	"Together We Are Beautiful"	Fern Kinney	1
9	"Coward of the County"	Kenny Rogers	1
10	"(Just Like) Starting Over"	John Lennon	1
11	"Working My Way Back to You"	The Detroit Spinners	1
12	"9 to 5"	Sheena Easton	3
13	"Baggy Trousers"	Madness	3
14	"Ashes to Ashes"	David Bowie	1
15	"Theme from M*A*S*H (Suicide Is Painless)"	MASH	1
16	"Going Underground"/"Dreams of Children"	The Jam	1
17	"Crying"	Don McLean	1
18	"The Winner Takes It All"	ABBA	1
19	"Dance Yourself Dizzy"	Liquid Gold	2
20	"There's No One Quite Like Grandma"	St Winifred's School Choir	1
21	"Atomic"	Blondie	1
22	"Upside Down"	Diana Ross	2
23	"Use It Up and Wear It Out"	Odyssey	1
24	"Start!"	The Jam	1
25	"Master Blaster (Jammin')"	Stevie Wonder	2
26	"Funkytown"	Lipps Inc.	2
27	"I'm in the Mood for Dancing"	The Nolans	3
28	"If You're Lookin' for a Way Out"	Odyssey	6
29	"One Day I'll Fly Away"	Randy Crawford	2
30	The Special AKA Live! EP	The Specials	1
31	"What You're Proposing"	Status Quo	2
32	"Take That Look Off Your Face"	Marti Webb	3
33	"No Doubt About It"	Hot Chocolate	2
34	"Stop the Cavalry"	Jona Lewie	3
35	"Brass in Pocket"	Pretenders	1
36	"Oops Up Side Your Head"	The Gap Band	6
37	"What's Another Year"	Johnny Logan	1
38	"Xanadu"	Olivia Newton-John/Electric Light Orchestra	1
39	"Special Brew"	Bad Manners	3
40	"King"/"Food for Thought"	UB40	4
41	"And the Beat Goes On"	The Whispers	2
42	"Turning Japanese"	The Vapors	3
43	"When You Ask About Love"	Matchbox	4
44	"I Could Be So Good for You"	Dennis Waterman with the Dennis Waterman Band	3
45	"My Girl"	Madness	3
46	"Never Knew Love Like This Before"	Stephanie Mills	4
47	"Enola Gay"	Orchestral Manoeuvres in the Dark	8
48	"Call Me"	Blondie	1
49	"More Than I Can Say"	Leo Sayer	2
50	"Embarrassment"	Madness	4

=== Best-selling albums ===
No.	Title	Artist	Peak position (in 1980)
1	Super Trouper	ABBA	1
2	Zenyatta Mondatta	The Police	1
3	Greatest Hits	Rose Royce	1
4	Guilty	Barbra Streisand	1
5	Pretenders	Pretenders	1
6	Reggatta de Blanc	The Police	2
7	Flesh and Blood	Roxy Music	1
8	Manilow Magic: The Best of Barry Manilow	Barry Manilow	4
9	Off the Wall	Michael Jackson	6
10	Duke	Genesis	1
11	Sky 2	Sky	1
12	Double Fantasy	John Lennon and Yoko Ono	2
13	One Step Beyond...	Madness	2
14	12 Gold Bars	Status Quo	3
15	String of Hits	The Shadows	1
16	The Last Dance	Various Artists	1
17	Greatest Hits Vol. 2	ABBA	1
18	Outlandos d'Amour	The Police	9
19	The Magic of Boney M. – 20 Golden Hits	Boney M.	1
20	Scary Monsters (And Super Creeps)	David Bowie	1
21	Greatest Hits	Dr. Hook	2
22	Tell Me on a Sunday	Marti Webb	2
23	Absolutely	Madness	2
24	Not the Nine O'Clock News	Not the Nine O'Clock News Cast	5
25	Tears and Laughter	Johnny Mathis	1
26	Signing Off	UB40	2
27	Never for Ever	Kate Bush	1
28	The Wall	Pink Floyd	3
29	The Specials	The Specials	4
30	I Just Can't Stop It	The Beat	3
31	Greatest Hits	Rod Stewart	1
32	Give Me the Night	George Benson	3
33	Get Happy!!	Elvis Costello and the Attractions	2
34	Me Myself I	Joan Armatrading	5
35	Bat Out of Hell	Meat Loaf	20
36	McCartney II	Paul McCartney	1
37	Emotional Rescue	The Rolling Stones	1
38	Back in Black	AC/DC	1
39	Peter Gabriel	Peter Gabriel	1
40	Eat to the Beat	Blondie	7
41	Autoamerican	Blondie	3
42	Parallel Lines	Blondie	15
43	Hotter than July	Stevie Wonder	2
44	Sometimes You Win	Dr. Hook	14
45	Wheels of Steel	Saxon	5
46	The Game	Queen	1
47	Sound Affects	The Jam	2
48	Kings of the Wild Frontier	Adam and the Ants	3
49	Jeff Wayne's Musical Version of The War of the Worlds	Jeff Wayne	32
50	Breaking Glass	Hazel O'Connor	5

== Classical music: new works ==
- William Alwyn
  - Leave Taking, song cycle
  - Rhapsody for piano, violin, viola and cello
  - String Quartet No. 3
- George Benjamin – Ringed by the Flat Horizon
- Lennox Berkeley – Magnificat and Nunc dimittis, Op.99
- Harrison Birtwistle
  - Clarinet Quintet
  - On the Sheer Threshold of the Night for chorus
- Peter Maxwell Davies
  - Farewell to Stromness, piano interlude (from The Yellow Cake Review)
  - Little Quartet, string quartet
  - Symphony No. 2
  - A Welcome to Orkney for chamber ensemble
  - The Yellow Cake Review for voice and piano
  - Yesnaby Ground, piano interlude (from The Yellow Cake Review)
- Alexander Goehr – Sinfornia for orchestra
- Iain Hamilton
  - Mass in A for a cappella chorus
  - Vespers, for mixed chorus, two pianos, harp and percussion
- Jonathan Harvey – Mortuos Plango, Vivos Voco
- Alun Hoddinott – The Heaventree of Stars
- Wilfred Josephs
  - Consort Music for brass
  - Double-bass Concerto
  - Double-bass Sonata
  - Equus, ballet
  - Tombeaux for organ
- Kenneth Leighton
  - Animal Heaven for soprano, recorder, cello and harpsichord
  - Fantasy on a Chorale for violin and organ
  - Missa Cornelia for treble voices and organ
  - Missa de Gloria, organ solo
- George Lloyd – The Vigil of Venus for voices and orchestra
- Nicholas Maw – The Ruin, for chorus and solo horn
- Thea Musgrave
  - From One to Another, for viola and fifteen strings
  - The Last Twilight for chorus, brass and percussion
- Edmund Rubbra
  - Canzona for Brass
  - Duo of cor anglais and piano
  - How Shall My Tongue Express? for unaccompanied chorus
  - Mass in Honour of St. Teresa of Avila for unaccompanied chorus
- Robert Simpson – String Quartet No. 8
- Michael Tippett – Wolf Trap Fanfare for brass ensemble
- Malcolm Williamson
  - Choric Hymn for mixed chorus
  - Konstanz Fanfare for brass, percussion and organ
  - Lament in memory of Lord Mountbatten for violin and string orchestra
  - Little Mass of St Bernadette for voices and organ
  - Ode for Queen Elizabeth for string orchestra
  - Richmond Fanfare for brass, percussion and organ
  - Symphony No. 5

== Opera ==
- Peter Maxwell Davies
  - Cinderella (children's opera)
  - The Lighthouse
- Kenneth Leighton – Columba
- William Mathias – The Servants

== Musical theatre ==
- Suburban Strains, book and lyrics by Alan Ayckbourn with music by Paul Todd

== Births ==
- 1 January – Richie Faulkner, rock guitarist (Judas Priest)
- 5 January – Lisa Gordon, drummer (Hepburn)
- 28 January – Nadia Shepherd, singer (Big Brovaz, Booty Luv)
- 9 March – Anna Clyne, composer of electroacoustic music
- 29 March – Andy Scott-Lee, singer (3SL)
- 4 April – Johnny Borrell, singer and musician (Razorlight)
- 12 April – Brian McFadden, Irish singer (Westlife)
- 26 April – James Hurst, singer and guitarist (North and South)
- 29 April – Kian Egan, Irish singer (Westlife)
- 8 May – Michelle McManus, singer and TV presenter
- 28 May – Mark Feehily, Irish singer (Westlife)
- 15 June – Lynsey Shaw, singer (Girls@Play)
- 23 June
  - Jessica Taylor, singer (Liberty X)
  - Andy Orr, Irish singer (Six)
- 29 June – Katherine Jenkins, soprano
- 7 July – Fyfe Dangerfield, singer-songwriter and guitarist (Guillemots and Senseless Prayer)
- 28 July – Noel Sullivan, singer (Hear'Say)
- 16 August – Bob Hardy, bassist (Franz Ferdinand)
- 19 August – Darius Danesh, singer-songwriter and actor
- 5 September
  - Kevin Simm, singer (Liberty X)
  - Zainam Higgins, singer (Cleopatra)
- 6 September
  - Kerry Katona, TV presenter and singer (Atomic Kitten)
  - Jayde Delpratt, singer (Ultimate Kaos)
- 10 September – Matthew Keaney, Irish singer (Reel)
- 24 September – Mikey Green, singer (Phixx)
- 3 October – Danny O'Donoghue, Irish singer-songwriter (Mytown, The Script)
- 9 November – Philip Gargan, Irish singer (Reel)
- 15 December – Sergio Pizzorno, guitarist with Kasabian
- date unknown
  - Iain Bell, composer of opera and vocal music
  - Catrin Finch, harpist
  - Cheryl Frances-Hoad, composer
  - Larry Goves, Welsh composer
  - Dobrinka Tabakova, Bulgarian-British composer

== Deaths ==
- 15 January – David Whitfield, singer, 53 (brain haemorrhage)
- 25 January – Queenie Watts, actress and singer, 53 (cancer)
- 29 January – Edward Lewis, record producer and executive (Decca), 79
- 9 February – John Kennedy, cellist, 57
- 18 February – Muriel Brunskill, operatic contralto, 80
- 19 February – Bon Scott, lead singer of AC/DC, 33 (alcohol poisoning)
- 3 April – Isla Cameron, singer, 53 (asphyxiation)
- 5 April – Hector MacAndrew, Scottish composer and fiddler, 77
- 4 May – Joe "Mr Piano" Henderson, pianist, 60
- 18 May – Ian Curtis, musician and singer (Joy Division), 23 (suicide)
- 22 May – Reginald Foort, theatre organist, 87
- 5 July – A. J. Potter, composer, 61
- 6 July – Frank Cordell, composer, arranger and conductor, 62
- 14 July - Malcolm Owen, singer (The Ruts), 26 (accidental drowning)
- 24 July – Peter Sellers, comic actor and singer ("Goodness Gracious Me"), 54 (heart attack)
- 5 August – Norman Fulton, composer and conductor, 71 (lung cancer)
- 9 August – Audrey Jeans, singer, 51 (car accident)
- 12 August – Leopold Spinner, Austrian-born composer, 74
- 8 September – Eddie Butcher, singer, songwriter and folk song collector, 80
- 18 September – Walter Midgley, operatic tenor, 68
- 25 September – John Bonham, drummer (Led Zeppelin), 32 (asphyxiation)
- 30 September – Horace Finch, pianist and organist, 74
- 11 October – Cassie Walmer, music hall singer, 92
- 27 October – Steve Peregrin Took, bongo player for Tyrannosaurus Rex, frontman for Shagrat and Steve Took's Horns, solo artist, 31 (asphyxiation)
- 29 October – Ouida MacDermott, singer, 91
- 8 December – John Lennon, singer, songwriter, and guitarist (The Beatles), 40 (murdered)
- 16 December – Keith Christie, jazz trombonist, 49
- 29 December – Lennie Felix, jazz pianist, 60 (car accident)

== See also ==
- 1980 in British radio
- 1980 in British television
- 1980 in the United Kingdom
