= The Blonde Bombshell =

- Also known as: Blonde Bombshell: The Diana Dors Story
- Genre: Drama
- Based on: Dors by Diana by Diana Dors
- Written by: Ted Whitehead
- Directed by: Robert Bierman
- Starring: Amanda Redman; Keeley Hawes; Rupert Graves; Gary Webster; Barnaby Kay; Larry Lamb; Josephine Butler
- Composer: Colin Towns
- Country of origin: United Kingdom
- Original language: English
- No. of series: 1
- No. of episodes: 2

Production
- Executive producers: Laura Mackie; Jo Wright
- Producer: Trevor Hopkins
- Running time: 200 mins (excluding adverts)
- Production company: LWT

Original release
- Network: ITV
- Release: 26 April – 27 April 1999

The Blonde Bombshell is a British two-part mini-series based on the life and death of actress Diana Dors. It was produced by LWT for ITV, and first shown on 26 and 27 April 1999. Keeley Hawes played Dors during her early career (1945–1960) and Amanda Redman during her later years (1965–1984).

Dors' son, Mark, claims that the series got the story wrong, and offers a different portrayal of his mother.

== Reception ==
Eddie Gibb of the Sunday Herald wrote "This is a sad story badly told."
