= Richard's Things =

- Theatrical release poster
- Directed by: Anthony Harvey
- Written by: Frederic Raphael
- Based on: Richard's Things by Frederic Raphael
- Produced by: Mark Shivas
- Starring: Liv Ullmann; Amanda Redman; Peter Burton; Tim Pigott-Smith; Elizabeth Spriggs
- Cinematography: Freddie Young
- Edited by: Lesley Walker
- Music by: Georges Delerue
- Production company: Southern Pictures
- Release date: 30 August 1980; (Venice Film Festival)
- Running time: 104 minutes
- Country: United Kingdom
- Language: English
- Budget: £900,000

Richard's Things is a 1980 British drama film directed by Anthony Harvey and starring Liv Ullmann, Amanda Redman and Peter Burton. It was written by Frederic Raphael and based on his 1973 novel of the same name. It was entered into the 37th Venice International Film Festival.

The film received generally negative reviews. Ullman won the Pasinetti Award for Best Actress at the Venice International Film Festival.

== Plot ==
After the death of the title character Richard, Kate Morris discovers that her husband had a young mistress named Josie for some time, and she was with him at the time of his fatal heart attack.

Despite the initial awkwardness between the two women, they soon begin to bond, leading to a lesbian relationship, as Josie puts it, to keep Richard alive with us a little longer: "A dead man is better than none." The film ends with the two going their separate ways, Josie going back to dating men while Kate goes it alone.

== Main cast ==
- Liv Ullmann as Kate Morris
- Amanda Redman as Josie
- Peter Burton as Colonel
- Tim Pigott-Smith as Peter
- Elizabeth Spriggs as Mrs Sells
- David Markham as Morris
- Mark Eden as Richard
- Gwen Taylor as Margaret
- John Vine as Doctor Mace
- Michael Maloney as Bill
- Tracey Childs as Joanna
- Margaret Lacey as Miss Beale
- Dawn Hope

== Production ==
The film was shot in March and April 1980, over a "tight" six week schedule. Filming locations included Maidenhead and Eastbourne. Harvey recalled before they arrived at one location for filming, there had been two suicides shortly before the crew got there, and that it was "unhappy shooting there ... it was very peculiar that place, I think it definitely was haunted."

According to Raphael, he asked Audrey Hepburn and Deborah Kerr to play the part of Kate, but they both declined. Harvey then sent the script to Katharine Hepburn for the part, but "she was too old, and knew it." So they showed the project to Liv Ullmann, who agreed to do the part for a salary of $350,000. Raphael said that Ullman stipulated she did not "wish to be asked to embrace another woman," so "the movie ceased to be scandalous and became coy." Raphael observed that "she can hardly not have known that Richard's Things is a love story between a dead man's wife and his mistress."

In an interview where Raphael was asked if the reason for the adaptation of his novel was because the "liberalism of cinema had finally caught up with the theme — a mistress having an affair with the widow of her lover", Raphael bluntly replied:

I suspect that it was because of the usual heterosexual fantasies about lesbian women. I fancied it as being much more erotic. Liv Ullman, who was not my favorite lady, behaved very badly toward Amanda Redman as soon as she realized Mandy was younger and prettier than she was. Having agreed to do the part, she then said she wasn't going to do any sex scenes.

Raphael said by the time they had finished shooting the film, Ullman had become "venomously hostile towards Redman", and Ullman's relationship with the director was not much better, as "Harvey told her to fuck off the day before they finished." (Note: According to Raphael: "She paid him out by leaving without a goodbye. He (and everyone else) put the blame on Liv's make-up man and hairdresser [Ray] whom she had insisted on bringing over from New York ... Ray made trouble throughout, but the real trouble was Liv herself. She is a star who lives in a hazed halo. She seems irremediably morose.") Raphael said in his view, Ullman was the only actress he ever worked with "who did not do her best for the piece." He also said that while "she may not have meant to sabotage it ... she did not honor her professional obligation to do her best." According to Mark Shivas, the producer, Ullman was a joy to work with, he said "there were no problems at all, she had a good sense of humour and indulged in lots of practical jokes, she got to be known as Miss Piggy on the set."

Raphael also recalled that Redman told him that in a scene where she showed her breasts to the camera, Ullman said to her, "There! I don’t know how you can do it. You have completely destroyed your career — no one will ever respect you again." Raphael opined that because Ullman did not have a leading man in the film, "she had no one who could flatter or flatten her."

== Reception ==
American film critic Janet Maslin wrote "if it does nothing else, the film illustrates what dire trouble an actress [Liv Ullmann] can land in when she works with a director with no understanding of her talents; the love affair between the two women is depicted with the dullest of good taste, so little is known about their grand passion; the key feature of the romance seems to be jealousy rather than sex."

Critic David Denby called the film "a patch of dreariness." He went on to highlight that Liv Ullmann "keeps a look of glassy, dull respectability on her face, relieved by some of the most actressy bits of business she's ever done; she is so solemn that she turns the woman's lesbian affair into a penance." Kate Rushin of Gay Community News was disappointed with the film writing, "sex isn't the only thing the film promises and doesn't deliver; questions of truth, deception, obsession and love are raised and then dropped; the tensions build and the film goes on for an hour and 45 minutes, as tantalizing, and unsatisfying, as the women's affair."

Film critic Michael Lasky opined that "although there are expected flashes of intelligence, they are about as effective in bringing some substance to this well-acted dirge as a book of matches would be in illuminating the entire Opera House." David Parkinson from Radio Times was not impressed with the film commenting that the film was a "misfiring adaptation of Frederic Raphael's novel; nobody is helped by the turgid screenplay."

Robert Hatch of The Nation stated that "since the love affair is handled with a delicacy that is almost prudish, the viewer is left with nothing to do but gaze upon the ladies as through a plate glass window." Film critic Vincent Canby wryly asked: "Has Miss Ullmann ever given a decent performance in a film not directed by Ingmar Bergman? If so, I haven't seen it." He went on to say that in this film "she's giving one of those dreadfully self-conscious, 'Great Lady' performances in which the star has all sorts of numbing opportunities to look brave, noble, bereaved, angry and confused."

== Accolades ==
Ullman won the Pasinetti Award for Best Actress at the 37th Venice International Film Festival, where the film had its premiere.

== See also ==
- Cinema of the United Kingdom
- List of British films of 1980
- List of LGBTQ-related films of 1980
- List of feature films with lesbian characters
- List of feature films with bisexual characters

== Sources ==
- Raphael, Frederic (2013). There and Then: Personal Terms 6. London: Carcanet Press. ISBN 978-1-84777-140-7.
