= Peter Burton =

British actor (1921–1989)

- Burton as Major Boothroyd in Dr. No (1962)
- Born: Peter Ray Burton; 4 April 1921; Bromley, Kent, England
- Died: 21 November 1989 (aged 68); London, England
- Years active: 1950–1989

Peter Ray Burton (4 April 1921 – 21 November 1989) was an English film and television actor.

== Early life ==
Peter Ray Burton, was born in Bromley, Kent, to Frederick Ray Burton and Gladys Maude (née Frazer).

== Career ==
Burton played Major Boothroyd in the first James Bond film, Dr. No (1962). He made two uncredited reappearances in Bond films, first as an RAF officer in Thunderball (1965) and later as a secret agent in the satirical Casino Royale.

In The Scarlet and the Black, the 1983 made-for-television docudrama concerning British, Irish, and U.S. counterintelligence agents working to rescue c. 4,000 Allied prisoners-of-war from Nazi deportation, Burton played the role of English aristocrat and British diplomat D'Arcy Godolphin Osborne, the 12th (and last) Duke of Leeds.

Burton guest starred in a number of television shows, including The Avengers, The Saint, Return of the Saint and UFO.

== Selected filmography ==
- They Were Not Divided (1950) – Minor Role (uncredited)
- What the Butler Saw (1950) – Bill Fenton
- The Wooden Horse (1950) – Nigel
- Tall Headlines (1952) – Graham Moore
- The Stolen Plans (1952) – Dr. Foster
- The Red Beret (1953) – Minor Role (uncredited)
- The Heart of the Matter (1953) – Perrot (uncredited)
- They Who Dare (1954) – Marine Barrett
- The Green Scarf (1954) – Purser
- Three Cases of Murder (1955) – Under Secretary for Foreign Affairs (segment "Lord Mountdrago")
- Value for Money (1955) – Hotel Receptionist (uncredited)
- Johnny, You're Wanted (1956) – Policeman
- Soho Incident (1956) – Inspector Collis
- The Long Arm (1956) – Creasy
- Reach for the Sky (1956) – Peter / Coltishall Officer (uncredited)
- Child in the Horse (1956) – Howard Forbes (uncredited)
- The Betrayal (1957) – Tony Adams
- Five on a Treasure Island (1957)
- A Night to Remember (1958) – 1st Class Steward (uncredited)
- The Night We Dropped a Clanger (1959) – 2nd Pilot
- Sink the Bismarck! (1960) – Captain (First Destroyer)
- Raising the Wind (1961) – 1st Viola
- Dr. No (1962) – Major Boothroyd
- The Iron Maiden (1962) – Thompson's Salesman
- Lawrence of Arabia (1962) – Sheik in Arab Council (uncredited)
- That Kind of Girl (1963) – Elliot Collier
- Thunderball (1965) – RAF Office in Car (uncredited)
- Berserk! (1967) – Gustavo
- Casino Royale (1967) – Agent (uncredited)
- Amsterdam Affair (1968) – Herman Ketelboer
- Doppelgänger (1969) – Medical Technician (uncredited)
- Hell Boats (1970) – Admiral's Aide
- All the Right Noises (1971) – Stage Manager
- Carry On at Your Convenience (1971) – Hotel Manager
- A Clockwork Orange (1971) – Junior Minister – Minister Frederick's Aid
- The Love Box (1972) – Charles Lambert (Charles and Margery)
- Leopard in the Snow (1978) – Mr. Framley
- The Bitch (1979) – Hotel Night Manager
- Richard's Things (1980) – Colonel
- Inchon (1981) – Adm. Sherman
- The Scarlet and the Black (1983) – D'Arcy Osborne, 12th Duke of Leeds
- The Jigsaw Man (1984) – Douglas Ransom
- The Doctor and the Devils (1985) – Customer
- Number One Gun (1990) – Merlin (final film role)

Preceded by N/A; First actor	Q (James Bond Character); 1962	Succeeded by Desmond Llewelyn; 1963–1999
