= Ffalabalam =

- Genre: Children's television series
- Country of origin: United Kingdom (Wales)
- Original language: Welsh

Original release
- Network: HTV Wales, S4C
- Release: 1980 – 1989

Ffalabalam was a Welsh-language television programme for children. The series started in 1980 and ended in 1989, with over 1,000 episodes broadcast. The producers of the programme were HTV Cymru, and it was shown on HTV Wales in Wales before moving to S4C in 1982.

The titles of the program were created from pictures by children and animated, and children singing the name of the programme. The village of Ffalabalam was the location of the series with small buildings placed in a studio. Several teddies, dolls and toy animals lived in the village including Dilys Draenog, Tedi Pinc, Sara, Nain, Meical y Mwnci, Owain Oen, Ken Kangarw, Bwni Binc, Lleucu'r Llwynog, Arth Frown, Huwcyn, and Penri'r Pengwyn. The two presenters would wander the village and tell the story by voicing the thoughts of the characters and singing songs.
