= Dread Broadcasting Corporation =

1980s pirate radio station in West London

- England
- Broadcast area: London

Programming
- Format: Reggae, Lovers rock, African, Soul, Funk

History
- First air date: 1980
- Last air date: 1984
- Former frequencies: 93.9 / 103.8 FM

Dread Broadcasting Corporation, also known as DBC, was a 1980s West London pirate radio station which is credited as Britain's first black music pirate radio station.

== History ==
It broadcast from the Neasden and Ladbroke Grove areas, and was founded by DJ Lepke (born Leroy Anderson) in the autumn of 1980. Originally broadcasting on AM, it moved to FM at the end of 1981. DBC would play reggae, lovers rock, African, soul, and funk.

Ranking Miss P (sister of Lepke) would originally start out on DBC, eventually moving onto a long career at the BBC. Guest shows would include the likes of Joe Strummer from the band The Clash, Neneh Cherry and author Lloyd Bradley.

Miss P, commenting on the station at the time: "There's never been a station run like DBC. Our format allows us to play music that would otherwise never be heard publicly. We create movement within the industry."

The station featured on the BBC's Oxford Road Show programme in January 1982, and a 1982 episode of London Weekend Televisions The London Programme.

DBC would eventually cease broadcasting in autumn 1984.

== Discography ==
- Striving To Be Free / It's A Sign 12" (DBC, 1982)
- Dread Broadcasting Corporation 2xCD (Trojan Records, 2004)
