= Gay Life (TV series) =

- Genre: LGBT history and community
- Presented by: Michael Attwell
- Country of origin: United Kingdom
- Original language: English
- No. of series: 2
- No. of episodes: 17

Production
- Executive producer: Barry Cox
- Producer: Michael Attwell
- Running time: 25 minutes
- Production company: London Minorities Unit

Original release
- Network: LWT
- Release: 10 February 1980 – 5 July 1981

Gay Life is a documentary television programme broadcast by London Weekend Television (LWT) in 1980. It was produced by Michael Atwell at LWT's London Minorities Unit, and was the United Kingdom's first LGBTQ television series.

== Production ==
Michael Atwell said programme could claim to be "the first time in the world that a major national TV company has given a whole series to gays". Three members of Gay Life's production team were gay, including Attwell, who said the staff felt that they were "in a sense trying to ride two horses – putting forward the gay viewpoint and relating to non-gay people". This was encapsulated for the production team by the slogan "For and about gays". Gay Life was first broadcast, in the London region, on 10 February 1980 at 11:30 pm. Notable contributors included comedian Graham Chapman, who spoke of his experience as a gay parent in the February 24 episode.

== Reception ==
The debut episode was reviewed by John Russell Taylor in the following week's issue of Gay News. In his essay "Something for Everyone" included in the critical theory book Queer TV: Theories, Histories, Politics, edited by Glyn Davis and Gary Needham, Gregory Woods wrote Taylor's review had raised "basic but crucial questions that would keep cropping up in relation to gay television programmes for the next two decades". Taylor's questions concerned the visibility of men in drag and leather who because of their frequent appearances as representative of the gay community in news reports "led the straight media to treat gayness as extraordinary, and therefore had to seek out vivid representatives of it in order to confirm their own per-constructed idea of it" and also his belief that the programme may adopt divided aims in an attempt to appeal to both "uncomprehending straights" and its desire to "preach to the converted".

Richard Ingrams negatively reviewed the 10 July 1981 episode of Gay Life as the television critic for The Spectator. In his column he wrote that "I at last managed to catch up with the lesbians on Sunday, and about time too is all that I can say". The episode discussed artificial insemination of which Ingrams wrote that it was a "far more satisfactory method in many lesbian eyes because one can ensure that the donor is a suitable person—presumably a Guardian-reading Gay. Various mournful specimens were wheeled on to hail this Brave New World." Ingrams further criticised Gay Life by saying:

Nothing was said by anyone about the dangers involved in all these experiments in eugenics, the deliberate breeding of children—who are almost bound to grow up as neurotic misfits—simply to gratify the selfish urges of a lot of perverts. There might be someone at London Weekend Television who would see that even in our wonderful new permissive society there were good grounds for not allowing this sort of propaganda to be made without giving some indication of the perils attached […]

and concluded by writing:

A few years ago lesbians were rightly regarded as subjects for humour or else sympathy. Now, if people like LWT have their way, we are expected to treat them as a quasi-political movement with 'rights'. Most of this is the fault of the so-called Women's Movement, of which the lesbian activists are the extreme wing.

== Episodes ==
=== Series 1 (1980) ===
All episodes were originally broadcast without episode title cards. Episodes rebroadcast in 1981 were given titles.

No.	Title	Directed by	Written by	Original release date
1	"Episode 1"	Stephen Butcher	Michael Attwell	10 February 1980
In the wake of the Blunt affair, the programme asks whether gay civil servants are potential spies.
2	"Heaven"	Nigel Wattis	Michael Attwell	17 February 1980
Take a look at the city's newest gay disco, drag pubs, the leather scene.
3	"Episode 3"	Nigel Wattis	Michael Attwell	24 February 1980
Should lesbians be mothers, and should they have custody of their children? Should gay men be permitted to adopt?
4	"Episode 4"	Stephen Butcher	Michael Attwell	2 March 1980
An investigation into allegations of police harassment of homosexuals in London.
5	"Episode 5"	Nigel Wattis	Michael Attwell	9 March 1980
Look into aspects of gay relationships including gay dating services and gay marriages.
6	"Episode 6"	Stephen Butcher	Michael Attwell	16 March 1980
Gay teachers and how open they should be about their homosexuality in the classroom?
7	"Episode 7"	Nigel Wattis	Michael Attwell	23 March 1980
How a married person coped after discovering their spouse was gay.
8	"Gays in the Media"	Stephen Butcher	Michael Attwell	30 March 1980
How gay people are portrayed in the media.
9	"Episode 9"	Stephen Butcher	Michael Attwell	20 April 1980
A look at lesbian teenagers.
10	"Episode 10"	Nigel Wattis	Michael Attwell	27 April 1980
Gay people in the armed forces.
11	"Episode 11"	Stephen Butcher	Michael Attwell	4 May 1980
How gay people exercise influence through political organisation.

=== Series 2 (1981) ===
No.	Title	Directed by	Written by	Original release date
12	"Lesbians"	Judy Jackson	Michael Attwell	31 May 1981
How gay women are challenging their roles as lesbians. A surviving suffragette talks about being a lesbian in the early twentieth century.
13	"Being Gay in the Thirties, to Be Gay or Not?"	John Oven	Michael Attwell	7 June 1981
Gay men challenge the use of the word "gay". A gay man in his 70s recalls the London gay scene in London during pre-War period. Former government minister, Ian Harvey who resigned in the 1950s after being arrested for a homosexual offence, comments on gay life in his youth.
14	"Parents"	Judy Jackson	Michael Attwell	14 June 1981
The parents of gay people discuss their reactions to finding out that their children are gay. The issue is discussed by a clergyman, his wife, and their lesbian daughter.
15	"Sexuality–Is there a Choice?"	John Oven	Michael Attwell	21 June 1981
The phrase 'sexuality is a choice' is debated by gay people, their friends and family.
16	"Male Sexuality"	Judy Jackson	Michael Attwell	28 June 1981
Gay men discuss male sexuality. Some men challenge the concept of homosexuality as a modern contrivance.
17	"Lesbians As Mothers"	John Oven	Michael Attwell	5 July 1981
A look at the increasing use of artificial insemination by lesbians to achieve pregnancy.
