= Dream FM (London) =

Pirate radio station

Dream FM London
- England
- Broadcast area: London

Programming
- Format: Happy hardcore, breakbeat hardcore, jungle, house

History
- First air date: January 1994
- Former frequencies: 107.0 FM / 107.6 FM

Dream FM was a London pirate radio station active in the 1990s, that championed happy hardcore music.

Dream FM started broadcasting in January 1994 from Battersea, South West London, having briefly been named Global FM. Dream played predominantly happy hardcore and breakbeat hardcore but also jungle and house, during the transitional period where breakbeat music was fragmenting into different genres. In March 1995, Dream moved to 107.6 FM, with the station promoting raves at London venues such as Club Labrynth, Bagley's, Adrenalin Village, The Fridge, and Linford Film Studio. It hosted live outside broadcasts from its events and had phone-ins and on-air games such as Beat The Raid.

In April 1996, Dream was included in a BBC First Sight documentary about pirate radio in London.

Between 1996 and 1998, Dream produced a monthly magazine, Dream Magazine, which was available on the high-street.

Dream FM ceased broadcasting on 13 April 1997, hosting a farewell party on 19 April at London's Linford Film Studio venue.
