= Louis Demetrius Alvanis =

British classical pianist (born 1960)

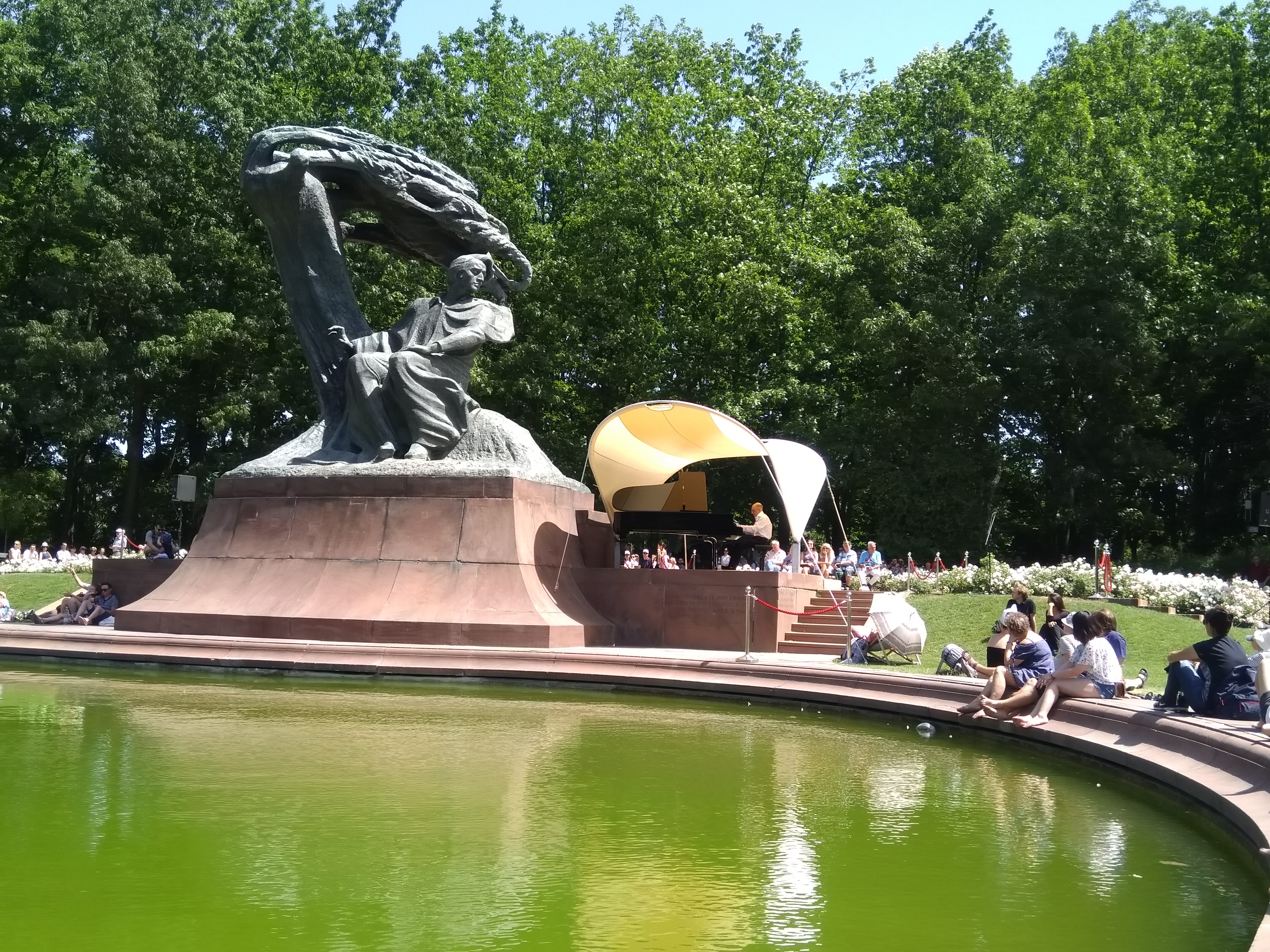
Louis Demetrius Alvanis, Łazienki Park, Warsaw, 2019

Louis Demetrius Alvanis (born 21 December 1960) is a British classical pianist. He made his concerto debut at the Royal Festival Hall at the age of twenty. Alvanis plays the full range of keyboard repertoire from the Baroque masters to contemporary serious music. He is particularly known for his performances of the Romantics, especially Chopin, Schumann and Brahms some of which have been recorded on CD with Meridian Records. Commenting on his recording of Chopin’s Three Piano Sonatas, Fanfare Magazine remarked, "this is playing of a gifted and greatly cultivated Chopin pianist".
