= Suburban Strains =

1980 musical by Alan Ayckbourn

- Original language: English
- Written by: Alan Ayckbourn
- Characters: Caroline; Kevin; Matthew; Various supporting roles
- Subject: Unsatisfactory relationships
- Setting: Various locations over a summer three years ago and winter today

Premiere
- Date: 18 January 1980
- Place: Stephen Joseph Theatre (Westwood site), Scarborough
- Official website

Suburban Strains is a 1980 musical by British playwright Alan Ayckbourn with music by Paul Todd. This was the first attempt Ayckbourn made at a musical since the ill-fated Jeeves! in 1975. It is about a teacher, Caroline, whose marriage to actor Kevin breaks down, only to find her new partner, doctor Matthew, even worse due to his control freakery, before making up with Kevin again.
