= London Weekend Radio =

Pirate radio station active in the 1980s

London Weekend Radio (LWR)
- England
- Broadcast area: London

Programming
- Format: Soul, hip hop, reggae, jazz-funk, house

History
- First air date: 1 January 1983
- Last air date: Summer 1990
- Former frequencies: 92.5 FM

London Weekend Radio also known as LWR was a pirate radio station active in London in the 1980s.

== History ==
LWR first broadcast on 1 January 1983, originally playing contemporary pop music during the day, with more specialist music shows in the evening and weekends. With the advent of new broadcasting laws in 1984, the station made the decision to close down on 14 July 1984. This close down would be brief, and with management of the station passing to club promoter Zak Dee, on 15 September 1984, LWR rose again as a dedicated soul, hip hop, jazz-funk, and reggae station.

LWR would launch the career of the DJ Tim Westwood, whose Rap Show would later achieve success on Capital Radio and BBC Radio 1. Other DJs and presenters have included rapper Derek B, Jazzy M (whose show The Jacking Zone is considered to be the first radio show playing all house music), Mr. C (of The Shamen), Ron Tom, Maxi Jazz (of Faithless), Master Cee (from sound system Mastermind), DJ Camilla, Barry B, and DJ Elayne.

Like its rival Kiss FM, LWR closed down temporarily on New Year's Eve 1989 in order to apply for a legal license. It would be unsuccessful, and it returned briefly again to the air as a pirate before finally ending in summer 1990.
