= Radio Enoch =

Former British pirate radio station

Two Spires Radio, better known as Radio Enoch was a pirate radio station in the United Kingdom, operating out of the West Midlands, homeland of its namesake, Enoch Powell. Radio Enoch professed a socially right-wing viewpoint and extolled the virtues of capitalism and privatisation. The manager claimed it operated as an unlicensed station because its views on race and immigration would prevent it from being able to broadcast in what it deemed a "socialist" media. The station also expressed support for the white minority rule governments of Rhodesia and South Africa. The station was launched in 1978, broadcasting hour-long shows monthly.

The group behind Radio Enoch called themselves "People Against Marxism".

The General Post Office had some trouble in shutting down Radio Enoch although it knew about 200 people were involved with the station. The broadcasts were transmitted from a variety of sites across the United Kingdom, and the authorities were always two steps behind. Transmitting equipment was put into storage between broadcasts.

The rise of Thatcherism and a more conservative political climate signalled the end of Radio Enoch's usefulness. Its purpose in returning a Conservative government complete, Radio Enoch stopped broadcasting in June 1980, vowing to return if a socialist government returned. It did not return after the New Labour victories from 1997.
