= Amanda Redman =

British actress (born 1957)

Amanda Redman MBE
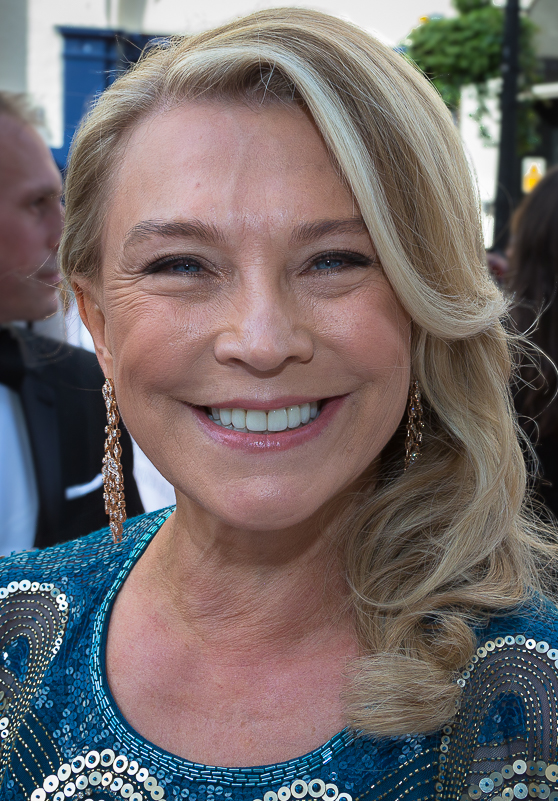
- Redman at the 2015 British Academy Television Awards, May 2015
- Born: Amanda Jacqueline Redman; 12 August 1957 (age 69); Brighton, Sussex, England
- Education: Bristol Old Vic Theatre School
- Occupation: Actress
- Years active: 1975–present
- Spouses: Robert Glenister (m. 1984; div. 1992) Damian Schnabel (m. 2010)
- Children: 1

Amanda Jacqueline Redman (born 12 August 1957) is an English actress, known for her roles as Detective Superintendent Sandra Pullman in the BBC One series New Tricks (2003–2013) and as Dr. Lydia Fonseca in The Good Karma Hospital (2017–2022). She gained BAFTA TV Award nominations for At Home with the Braithwaites (2000–2003) and Tommy Cooper: Not Like That, Like This (2014). Her film roles include For Queen and Country (1988), Sexy Beast (2000) and Mike Bassett: England Manager (2001).

== Early life ==
Redman was born in Brighton, Sussex, on 12 August 1957. Her father, Ronald Jack Redman (1929–1980), was born in Camberwell, London to parents from the East End, and her mother, Joan Beryl Redman (née Herrington, 1927–2014), was born in Quetta which was then still in India to William Herrington, a British Indian Army soldier. Redman's father died at the age of 51, when she was 23. Redman had one brother, who died of pneumonia in 2008.

Redman is badly scarred on her left arm as a result of an accident when she was 18 months old. She was scalded by a pan of boiling hot turkey and vegetable soup and suffered burns to 75% of her body. Her arm was the only part of her body permanently affected, but the trauma was so severe that she was pronounced clinically dead at the Queen Victoria Hospital in East Grinstead, Sussex.

== Career ==
Redman trained at the Bristol Old Vic Theatre School. She was in the same year as Daniel Day-Lewis, Miranda Richardson and Greta Scacchi.

In 1984, she appeared as Marina in the BBC Shakespeare production of Pericles, Prince of Tyre opposite Mike Gwilym. She also played Maxine in Oxbridge Blues, a British television mini-series, produced by the BBC and first shown in 1984 written by Frederick Raphael. In 1985, she played Janet in the touring version of The Rocky Horror Show.

In 1986, she played Miss Fairfax (Gwendolen) in the BBC Drama production of The Importance of Being Earnest by Oscar Wilde. In 1988, she played Julia Melville in the BBC Theatre Night production of Richard Brinsley Sheridan's The Rivals.

She played opposite Liv Ullmann in Richard's Things (1980), took over from Alfred Molina in the 1990s comedy drama El C.I.D., playing a new female lead in the series, and played Diana Dors in the TV film The Blonde Bombshell (1999). She presented an MTV show on satellite TV in the 1990s. She co-starred in the first two series of Dangerfield in 1995, playing Joanna Stevens, and played a role in Taggart the same year. In 2000, she played Deedee Dove in the feature film Sexy Beast. From 2000 until 2003, she played Alison Braithwaite, a woman whose life is turned upside down after she wins the lottery, in ITV's At Home with the Braithwaites.

From 2003 to 2013, Redman took the role of DSI Sandra Pullman in the BBC's New Tricks. In July 2013, she announced her departure; Tamzin Outhwaite replaced her.

In June 2006, Redman performed in Children's Party at the Palace as Cruella DeVil for the Queen's 80th birthday, and was the subject of an episode of the BBC documentary series Who Do You Think You Are?, a programme that explored her family history.

In 2015, Redman played the role of Jackie Rose in the three-part ITV drama The Trials of Jimmy Rose, starring alongside Ray Winstone. From 2017, she played Lydia Fonseca in the ITV drama series The Good Karma Hospital.

Redman is the founder and principal of the Artists Theatre School. She directs an annual show which is performed at The Questors Theatre in Ealing.

In 2018, she became a patron of Brighton Open Air Theatre. She told the Brighton Argus:

My stepfather used to bowl right here where the theatre is and my mother used to live in Dyke Road. When I was told about the history of this place I was incredibly moved. Whenever there is a venture where people are honestly trying to put something back into the community, you have to help however you can.

In 2024, Redman was awarded an honorary benchership with Middle Temple. In the same year, she became a trustee of the Royal Theatrical Fund.

== Awards and nominations ==
- 2001 – Nominated – BAFTA TV Award – Best Actress for At Home with the Braithwaites
- 2002 – Winner – Chlotrudis Award – Best Actress for Sexy Beast
- 2003 – Nominated – National Television Award – Most Popular Actress for At Home with the Braithwaites
- 2007 – Nominated – TV Quick Award – Best Actress for New Tricks
- 2008 – Nominated – Crime Thriller Award – Best Actress for New Tricks
- 2015 – Nominated – BAFTA TV Award – Best Supporting Actress for Tommy Cooper: Not Like That, Like This
- 2016 – Winner – New York Festivals International TV and Film Awards – Best Actress for The Trials of Jimmy Rose

== Personal life ==
Redman married actor Robert Glenister in 1984; they had one daughter together, Emily, before divorcing in 1992. Redman is credited with encouraging her then-brother-in-law, Philip Glenister, to go to drama school and pursue acting; he has played DCI Gene Hunt in both Life on Mars and Ashes to Ashes.

Redman was appointed a Member of the Order of the British Empire (MBE) in the 2012 Birthday Honours for services to drama and charity.

== Filmography ==
Year	Title	Role	Notes
1978	Turning Year Tales	Member	Episode: "Clubs"
1979	The Innes Book of Records		
1980	Richard's Things	Josie	
1980	Tales of the Unexpected	Anna Warrack	Episode: "I'll Be Seeing You"
1980	Tales of the Unexpected	Pat	Episode: "The Party"
1982	On the Line	Sara Newton	12 episodes
1982	The Agatha Christie Hour	Pauline, Grand Duchess of Ostravia	Episode: "Jane in Search of a Job"
1982	La Ronde	Sweet Young Thing	
1984	Oxbridge Blues	Maxine	Episode: "Oxbridge Blues"
1984	Give My Regards to Broad Street	Office Receptionist	
1984	Pericles, Prince of Tyre	Marina	
1986	To Have and to Hold	Viv Meadows	8 episodes
1986	Bergerac	Pauline Taylor	Episode: "Fires in the Fall"
1986	The Importance of Being Earnest	Gwendolen Fairfax	
1988	For Queen and Country	Stacey	
1988	Theatre Night	Julia Melville	Episode: "The Rivals"
1988–1989	Streets Apart	Sylvia Grant	Series 1–2; 12 episodes
1990	Screen Two	Kate	Episode: "The Lorelei"
1991	Spender	Roberta 'Bobby' Montgomery	Episode: "The Candidate"
1991	The Men's Room	Sally	5 episodes
1991	The Ruth Rendell Mysteries	Helen Missal	Episodes: "From Doon With Death", Parts 1 & 2
1992	El C.I.D.	Rosie Bromley	Series 3; 6 episodes
1993	Casualty	Olivia Purcell	Episode: "The Ties That Bind"
1993	Body & Soul	Lynn Gibson	6 episodes
1993	Demob	Janet Deasey	6 episodes
1995	Taggart	Julie Carson	Episode: "Black Orchid"
1995	Dangerfield	Dr. Joanna Stevens	Series 1–2; 18 episodes
1996	The Ruth Rendell Mysteries	Susan Townsend	Episodes: "The Secret House of Death", Parts 1 & 2
1996	Beck	Beck	6 episodes
1998	Performance	Regan	Episode: "King Lear"
1998	Close Relations	Prudence Hammond	5 episodes
1998	Next Birthday	Sarah	Short film
1999	The Blonde Bombshell	Diana Dors (1965-1984)	Episode: "#1.2"
1999–2000	Hope And Glory	Debbie Bryan	Series 1–2; 10 episodes
2000	Sexy Beast	Deedee Dove	
2000	The Wedding Tackle	Petula	
2000	The Sight	Detective Pryce	
2000–2003	At Home with the Braithwaites	Alison Braithwaite	Series 1–4; 26 episodes
2001	Mike Bassett: England Manager	Karine Bassett	
2002	Scar Stories		
2003	Suspicion	Carol Finnegan	2 episodes
2003–2013, 2015	New Tricks	Detective Superintendent Sandra Pullman	Series 1–10; 84 episodes
2004	DNA	Sally Parker	Episode: "DNA", Part 2
2004	Who Do You Think You Are	Herself	Series 1, episode 2
2005	Mike Bassett: Manager	Karine Bassett	6 episodes
2006	The Children's Party at the Palace	Cruella de Vil	Segment: "101 Dalmatians"
2006	Vincent	Jackie Nelson	Episode: "The Bodies Beneath"
2008	Honest	Lindsay Carter	6 episodes
2008	Little Dorrit	Mrs. Merdle	11 episodes
2014	Tommy Cooper: Not Like That, Like This	Gwen 'Dove' Cooper	
2015	The Trials of Jimmy Rose	Jackie Rose	3 episodes
2017—2022	The Good Karma Hospital	Dr. Lydia Fonseca	Series 1–4; 24 episodes
2017	Diana, Our Mother: Her Life and Legacy	Narrator	One-off documentary
2017	Prince Harry and Meghan: Truly, Madly, Deeply	Narrator	One-off documentary
2019	Hafu	Mrs Coates	Short Film
2019	Prince Charles: Inside the Duchy of Cornwall	Narrator	One-off documentary
2020	Bumps	Anita	Pilot episode
2020	For You	Isobel	Channel 4's On the Edge drama anthology
2021	Fading	Jane Campbell	Short film
2024	Scoop	Netta McAlister, Sam McAlister's mother	
2025	Murder Before Evensong	Audrey Clement	Series 1

== Theatre ==
Year	Title	Location	Notes
1975	Mother Goose	Stoke-on-Trent	
1978	The Seagull	Bristol Old Vic	
1978	As You Like It	Bristol Old Vic	
1978	A Man For All Seasons	Bristol Old Vic	
1978	The Man Who Came to Dinner	Bristol Old Vic	
1978	Jack and the Beanstalk	Bristol Old Vic	
1979	Destiny	Bristol Old Vic	
1979	Love for Love	Bristol Old Vic	
1979	A Month in the Country	Bristol Old Vic	
1979	Lucy	Playwrights Company	
1979	Triple Bill	Playwrights Company	
1979	The Rocky Horror Show	National Tour	Playing Janet Weiss
1980	The Bristol Twins	Bristol Old Vic	
1981	If We Only Have Love	Bristol Old Vic	
1982	Windy City	Victoria Palace Theatre	Playing Esther alongside Dennis Waterman
1982	Out to Lunch	New End Theatre	
1983	Crimes of the Heart	Bush Theatre	Playing Meg
1983	The Duenna	Young Vic	
1983	Swan Esther	Young Vic	
1984	Private Lives	Oxford Playhouse	National Tour
1984	The Marriage of Figaro	Warehouse Theatre	
1985	State of Affairs	Lyric Hammersmith	
1986	Love for Love	Royal National Theatre	Directed by Peter Wood
1989	The Last Waltz	Greenwich Theatre	
1989–1990	Our Country's Good and The Recruiting Officer	Royal Court Theatre, Garrick Theatre and world tour	Directed by Max Stafford-Clark
1992	Private Lives	Gate Theatre and Cork Opera House	
1997	King Lear	Royal National Theatre	Playing Regan, directed by Sir Richard Eyre
2006	The Queen's Handbag	Buckingham Palace	As part of Children's Party at the Palace playing Cruella De Vil
2016	The Queen's 90th birthday celebrations	Windsor	Narrating Queen's 90th birthday celebrations
