= Ranking Miss P =

The Ranking Miss P
- Born: Margaret Anderson; 1959; Lambeth, London, England
- Years active: 1979–present
- Children: 3
- Career
- Station(s): Dread Broadcasting Corporation, BBC Radio 1 (1985–1990), BBC London 94.9

Margaret Anderson, better known as The Ranking Miss P, is a British radio presenter and DJ.

== Biography ==
After leaving school, Miss P studied to become a teacher, but was persuaded by her brother Leroy Anderson (DJ Lepke) to start broadcasting on his radio station Dread Broadcasting Corporation in 1979. The station is regarded as the first British black music radio station. Both Miss P and Lepke are the younger siblings of Bob Marley's wife Rita Marley.

In 1983, Miss P was approached by BBC Television to compose and perform visual promotional trails and the theme song for its weekly magazine programme Ebony.

On 31 March 1985, she began presenting a weekly reggae show Culture Rock on BBC Radio 1 on Sunday nights. This was Radio 1's first ever show dedicated solely to reggae music, and Miss P was one of the station's first black presenters. Her entire show on 12 May 1985 was a tribute to the life and music of Bob Marley.

She left BBC Radio 1 in 1990 and went on to present a programme titled Riddim and Blues on BBC Radio London on Saturday nights, in which she played a wide variety of black music.

Miss P has two sons and a daughter.
