= PCRL =

PCRL (People's Community Radio Link) was a pirate radio station in Birmingham, UK. It began in 1985 as an attempt to quell civil unrest during the Handsworth Riots.

In February 2002, the station was accused of causing interference to the emergency radio system used by West Midlands Fire Service.

PCRL closed in February 2004 after the station organisers were ordered to carry out community service and "prime mover" Cecil Morris was given a suspended prison sentence for illegal broadcasting.
