= Religious broadcasting =

Dissemination of religious matter on television and radio

Logo of Trinity Broadcasting Network, an international Christian-based broadcast television network based in Tustin, California. It is widely regarded as one of the world's largest religious television network.

Religious broadcasting, sometimes referred to as faith-based broadcasts, is the dissemination of television and/or radio content that intentionally has religious ideas, religious experience, or religious practice as its core focus. In some countries, religious broadcasting developed primarily within the context of public service provision (as in the UK), whilst in others, it has been driven more by religious organisations themselves (as in the United States). Across Europe and in the US and Canada, religious broadcasting began in the earliest days of radio, usually with the transmission of religious worship, preaching or "talks". Over time, formats evolved to include a broad range of styles and approaches, including radio and television drama, documentary, and chat show formats, as well as more traditional devotional content. Today, many religious organizations record sermons and lectures, and have moved into distributing content on their own web-based IP channels.

Religious broadcasting can be funded commercially or through some sort of public broadcasting-style arrangement (religious broadcasters are often recognized as non-profit organizations). Donations from listeners and viewers, often tax-deductible, are solicited by some broadcasters. In the US, 42 percent of non-commercial radio stations currently have a religious format where on the other hand about 80 percent of the 2,400 Christian radio stations and 100 full-power Christian TV stations throughout the entire United States are considered non-profit.

In some countries, particularly those with an established state religion, broadcasting related to one particular religion only is allowed, or in some cases required. For example, a function of the state-owned Pakistan Broadcasting Corporation is by law "to broadcast such programmes as may promote Islamic ideology, national unity and principles of democracy, freedom equality, tolerance and social justice as enunciated by Islam..." (s. 10(1)(b)).

Broadcasting in both radio and TV has taken on a new look with the development of the internet and mobile devices. Internet radio stations and internet TV stations have been on the rise over the last few years. The main reason for the increase is that the cost to set up and operate is significantly less than traditional radio and TV stations. This is huge for religious organisations as it allows them to put their religious content to a world wide audience at a fraction of the cost.

== Radio ==
(The distinction between radio and television broadcasters is not rigid; broadcasters in both areas may appear in the Radio or Television section in this article.)

=== Australia ===
Religious radio stations include

- 3ABN Australia Radio
- Melbourne Jewish Radio
- Australia National Hindu Radio (ANHR)

=== Brazil ===
- Rede Católica de Rádio (Catholic radio network)
  - Rádio Canção Nova
  - Rádio Aparecida
  - Rádio Imaculada Conceição
  - Rádio Evangelizar
- Rádio Novo Tempo (Seventh-day Adventist Church)
- Rede Aleluia (Universal Church of the Kingdom of God)
- Rádio Deus é Amor (God is Love Pentecostal Church)
- Rede Gospel FM (Reborn in Christ Church)
- Rede Nossa Rádio]] (International Grace of God Church)
- Rede Feliz FM (Peace and Life Christian Community)
- Rede Sara Brasil FM (Heal Our Earth Evangelical Community)

=== Canada ===
- Canadian Islamic Broadcasting Network (CIBN) - Islamic Talk Radio

=== India ===
- World Hindu Radio;World latest Hindu Community Radio Station based in Ayodhya, India
- Asian Hindu Radio; based on Ayodhya and Suva
- Marithus Hindu Voice
- Fiji Hindu Radio
- Angel Radio
- Jai Ram Community Radio
- Hindustan World Radio
- Malabar Muslim Radio
- Asian Muslim World
- Lord Radio
- Jwiees Radio International
- Vice of Hindu (VOH)
- Vice of Jain (VOJ)
- Vice of Sikh (VOS)
- Vice of Parasi (VOP)
- Vice of Christian (VOC)
- VOH Hindi
- VOH Tamil
- VOH Bangla

=== Italy ===
- Radio Maria; International Catholic radio broadcasting, founded by Erba, has branches in 55 countries around the world. Vatican Radio is its sister media.

=== Netherlands ===
- Buddhist Broadcasting Foundation
- Humanistische Omroep: A small broadcaster dedicated to secular Humanism.
- IKON (Interkerkelijke Omroep Nederland): A small broadcaster representing a diverse set of nine mainstream Christian churches.
- Joodse Omroep The new name of NIKmedia (Nederlands-Israëlitisch Kerkgenootschap): Dutch-Jewish broadcaster.
- NIO (Nederlandse Islamitische Omroep): Small Islamic broadcaster.
- NMO (Nederlandse Moslim Omroep): Small Islamic broadcaster, slightly more progressive than the NIO.
- OHM (Organisatie Hindoe Media): Small Hindu broadcaster.
- RKK (Rooms-Katholiek Kerkgenootschap): Small Roman Catholic broadcaster, actual programming produced by the KRO. Roman Catholic events and services on television are broadcast by the RKK.
- ZvK (Zendtijd voor Kerken): Small broadcaster that broadcasts church services from some smaller Protestant churches.

=== New Zealand ===
- Rhema Media encompasses three radio networks; Rhema, Life FM and Star.

=== Philippines ===
- Bible Radio DZBR (Cathedral of Praise)
- Catholic Media Network (Catholicism)
- Cebu Catholic Television Network
- End-Time Mission Broadcasting Service
- FEBC Philippines (Christianity)
- Hope Channel (TV), Hope Radio and Adventist World Radio (Seventh-day Adventist Church)
- INC Radio 954 (Iglesia ni Cristo)
- Sonshine Media Network International (Kingdom of Jesus Christ)
- ZOE Broadcasting Network (Jesus Is Lord Church Worldwide)

=== Poland ===
- Radio Maryja – A Christian-national Polish educational, guide and religious radio station based in Toruń, belonging to the Lux Veritatis Foundation registered in Warsaw.

=== Portugal ===
- Rádio Renascença - Owned by the Portuguese Catholic Church
- Rádio Maria – Catholic radio
- Rádio Canção Nova – Catholic radio

=== South Korea ===
- GCN Global Christian Network (broadcaster)
- CTS (Christian Television System)
- CBS (Christian Broadcasting System)
- FEBC Korea (Far East Broadcasting Company)
- PBC (Pyeonghwa/Peace Broadcasting Corporation); catholic
- BBS (Buddhist Broadcasting System)
- WBS (원음방송 – Original Sound Broadcasting)

=== Spain ===
- Cadena COPE - Owned by Spanish Catholic Church
- Radio María – Catholic radio

=== Trinidad and Tobago ===
- Radio Jaagriti 102.7 FM (Hindu); owned by the Sanatan Dharma Maha Sabha

=== United Kingdom ===
Religious broadcasting in the UK was established on 30 July 1922, a Sunday, when the first radio sermon was transmitted by J. Boon of the Peckham Christian Union, from the Burdette Aerial Works at Blackheath, to the congregation at Christ Church, Peckham, and listeners up to 100 miles distant.

The religious ethos of the British Broadcasting Corporation, and the importance attributed to the place of its religious output is predominantly due to the distinctive and formative role played by the BBC's first director-general, John Reith. Reith was the son of a Presbyterian minister. Although opposed to narrow dogmatism, he strongly believed that it was a public service duty of the BBC to actively promote religion. The pattern established by Reith in the early days, and the advisory system that he established, continued to exert a strong influence on the corporation's religious output through the war years and beyond, and eventually extend from radio into television.

British broadcasting laws prohibit religious organizations, political parties, local government, and trade unions from running national analog terrestrial stations. Some religious radio stations are available in certain areas on the MW (medium wave) or VHF (FM) wavebands; others transmit using other methods, some of them nationally (such as via digital terrestrial TV broadcasting, satellite, and cable).

Premier Radio is available on MW in the London area and also nationally on DAB. United Christian Broadcasters is available in both the London and Stoke-on-Trent areas, and nationally as well via DAB. TWR-UK is available on Sky, Freeview, Freesat and online. There are several UK-based radio stations that serve a genre group or locality, such as Cross Rhythms based in Stoke-on-Trent, a contemporary music station with a local FM community radio license. Branch FM operates across West Yorkshire and is a volunteer-run community Christian radio station. Like most other local Christian stations, they also use the Internet to gain national coverage. There are other UK-based radio channels which apply for regular temporary licenses, such as Flame FM on the Wirral, Cheshire which applies for two months of local FM broadcasting per year via a Restricted Service Licence (RSL), and Refresh FM, which regularly broadcasts in Manchester for 3 or 4 weeks over the Easter period.

Also, there are religious broadcasters that transmit to the UK from outside on medium wave at night (when MW signals travel much further) by buying airtime on commercial stations such as Manx Radio (from the Isle of Man) and Trans World Radio (from Monte Carlo).

Although there are tight restrictions on religious groups setting up their own radio and TV stations, there is a legal requirement for the BBC and ITV to broadcast a certain amount of religious programming. Some commercial local radio stations carry a limited amount of religious programming, particularly in Northern Ireland and parts of Scotland.

=== United States ===
The United States does not have a state religion or established church, and religious broadcasts most commonly feature various Christian sects. Although originally provided by independently operated stations, it currently is mainly provided by local or regional networks. Most stations hold non-commercial educational broadcast licenses. Although religious radio began with individual stations, because of the deregulation in the 1996 Telecommunications act it has become more consolidated with local affiliates under a national radio company.

Religious broadcasts began before a formal broadcasting station category was established. Beginning in May 1920, the sermons of Rev. Clayton B. Wells, pastor of Fairmont Congregational Church of Wichita, Kansas, were read on Sunday evenings over an amateur radio station, 9BW, operated by C. A. Stanley. After the development of organized broadcasting, the first full worship service, originating from the Calvary Episcopal Church, took place on 2 January 1921, over KDKA in East Pittsburgh, Pennsylvania. On 22 December 1921, the first broadcasting station license assigned to a religious institution was issued for WDM, operated by the Church of the Covenant in Washington, D.C. Other prominent early religious stations included KFSG, the Foursquare Gospel Church in Los Angeles, KFUO, The Lutheran Church – Missouri Synod, serving St. Louis, WLWL, the Paulist Fathers, and WBBR, Jehovah's Witnesses, both in New York City, WMBI, Moody Bible Institute in Chicago, and WBBL, Grace Covenant Presbyterian Church in Richmond, Virginia. However, the cost of operating a radio station on a non-commercial basis, plus generally restricted hours of operation, led to most of the early stations either shutting down or selling out to secular commercial operators.

The development of radio networks made national broadcasts possible, although the networks preferred non-controversial and non-denominational broadcasts. In April 1938, Time magazine described the Columbia Broadcasting System's interdenominational Church of the Air as "innocuous". Also, in December 1938, Lenox R. Lohr, president of the National Broadcasting Company (NBC), which at this time operated two nationwide networks, stated that NBC did not sell airtime for religious broadcasts; instead, it maintained a policy "to provide time, without monetary recompense, to the three great types of religious faiths prevailing in America — the Protestants, the Jews, and the Catholics — as distinguished from individual churches, or small group movements." Lohr said that NBC "turned to the most representative religious groups in the country to aid us in determining what religious programs are broadcast. All our regular Protestant programs are scheduled through the Federal Council of Churches; in the field of Catholicism, the National Council of Catholic Men acts in a like capacity, and, for the Jewish programs, the United Jewish Laymen's League." The one national network at this time that was willing to accept commercial religious broadcasts was the Mutual Broadcasting System, which carried the Lutheran Hour.

In the late 1930s, a Roman Catholic priest, Father Charles Coughlin, had a popular. although controversial, weekly broadcast carried by an independent commercial network. Coughlin was accused of being both pro-fascist and anti-semitic. Neville Miller, the head of the National Association of Broadcasters (NAB), called for the elimination of broadcasts that play "on religious bigotry... religious or racial prejudice or hatred". In 1939, largely in response to Coughlin, the NAB Code was updated to ban member stations from broadcasting commercial programs which featured controversial issues.

In 1938 the Federal Council of Churches petitioned the National Association of Broadcasters and the Federal Communications Commission formally requesting that paid religious programs be barred from the air. The council represented about thirty more liberal "mainstream" denominations, which was less than half of American Protestantism. In 1929, the council's general secretary had stated that, "in the future, no denomination or individual church will be able to secure any time whatever on the air unless they are willing to pay prohibitively high prices...."

The Moody Bible Institute was the first religious organization to use satellite radio to reach a larger audience than before, and was also one of the first religious broadcasting networks to receive a non-commercial educational FM license from the FCC, allowing them to open other stations.

Several national networks exist, including:

- Air1
- American Family Radio
- EWTN Radio
- Family Radio
- K-LOVE
- LifeTalk Radio
- Northwestern Media
- Radio 74 Internationale
- Relevant Radio
- Salem Radio Network
- 3ABN Radio
- VCY America

== Television ==
(The distinction between radio and television broadcasters is not rigid; broadcasters in both areas may appear in the Radio or Television section in this article.)

=== Australia ===
- Australian Christian Channel

=== Africa ===
- T.B. Joshua's Emmanuel TV.
- Ezekiel TV is a Christian television network started by Ezekiel Guti of ZAOGA Forward in Faith Ministries International (FIFMI) in 2008, based in South Africa. Most of the programming is from Zimbabwe, where ZAOGA FIFMI is headquartered. The channel broadcasts on the internet on the FIFMI Website.
- Deen TV is an Islamic TV station broadcasting to a wide range of audience interest based in South Africa.

=== Asia ===
- 3ABN
- CGTN
- BBS (Buddhist Broadcasting System)
- CPBC TV (Catholic Peace Broadcasting Corporation TV); HQ- Seoul, South Korea
- CPBS TV (Confucianism Peace Broadcasting Corporation TV)
- CGNTV (Christian Global Network Television),
- Kantas-HSTV (Kantor Warta Swastiyastu-Hindu Spirits Television)
- Kantas-HSTV

=== Brazil ===
- Redevida (Catholic national television network)
- TV Aparecida (Catholic national television network)
- TV Canção Nova (Catholic national television network)
- TV Evangelizar (Catholic national television network)
- TV Nazaré (Catholic regional television network, focused to Brazilian Legal Amazon states)
- TV Pai Eterno (Catholic national television network)
- RIT (owned by International Grace of God Church)
- TV Universal (owned by Universal Church of the Kingdom of God)
- Rede Mundial (owned by World Church of God's Power)
- Rede Boas Novas (owned by Convention of the Assemblies of God in Brazil)
- Rede Gospel (owned by Reborn in Christ Church)
- Rede Gênesis (owned by Heal Our Earth Evangelical Community)
- TV Novo Tempo (owned by Seventh-day Adventist Church)

=== Canada ===
Networks

Name	Owner	Religious Affiliation	Base	Range	Notes
Yes TV	Crossroads Christian Communications	Christianity (some multi-faith)	Burlington, Ontario	Nationwide	Airs a mixture of religious and general entertainment programming. Also available over-the-air in: Ontario (Greater Toronto Area, London, Ottawa); Alberta (Calgary, Edmonton)

Channels

Name	Owner	Religious Affiliation	Base	Range	Notes
ATN Aastha TV	Asian Television Network	Hinduism	Newmarket, Ontario	Nationwide	Only available on pay television
ATN Punjabi 5	Asian Television Network	Sikhism	Markham, Ontario	Nationwide	Only available on pay television
ATN Sikh Channel	Asian Television Network	Sikhism	Ontario	Nationwide	Only available on pay television
Daystar Canada	World Impact Ministries	Christianity (Evangelical)	Vancouver, British Columbia	Nationwide	Only available on pay television
HopeTV	ZoomerMedia	Christianity	Winnipeg, Manitoba	Nationwide	Available over-the-air in Manitoba (Winnipeg) and pay television nationwide.
Joytv	ZoomerMedia	Multi-faith	Fraser Valley, British Columbia	Nationwide	Available over-the-air in British Columbia (Vancouver, Lower Mainland, and Victoria) and pay television nationwide.
Salt + Light Television	Salt & Light Catholic Media Foundation	Christianity (Catholicism)	Toronto, Ontario	Nationwide	Only available on pay television
Vertical TV	Vertical Entertainment	Christianity	Brampton, Ontario	Nationwide	Only available on pay television
VisionTV	ZoomerMedia	Multi-faith	Toronto, Ontario	Nationwide	Only available on pay television
CFSO-TV	Logan & Corey McCarthy	Christianity (Mormonism)	Cardston, Alberta	Local	Only available over-the-air; airs selected programming from BYUtv
CFEG-TV	Clearbrook Mennonite Brethren Church	Christianity (Mennonite Brethren)	Abbotsford, British Columbia	Local	Only available over-the-air
Miracle Channel	The Miracle Channel Association	Christianity (Evangelical)	Lethbridge, Alberta	Local	Only available over-the-air; secondary affiliate of Trinity Broadcasting Network

=== France ===
- HolyGod TV, Christian station based in France with stated mission "to evangelise people in India, Sri Lanka, Africa, Europe and other countries and plant churches"
- HOSFO TV, Christian station in France founded by Pastor Allen IKADI and his wife Josiane Ondeu through their private Christian media company group HOSFO SAS
- GOSPLAY DIGITAL TELEVISION a 24/7 gospel music TV Channel.
- KTO; TV Catholique for the Archdiocese of Paris
- NLM TV (New Living Ministries), Christian station based in France with presence in other countries

=== Germany ===
- K-TV; K-TV Katholisches Fernsehen. Catholic broadcaster founded by Father Hans Buschor in 1999 in Gossau, Switzerland. K-TV produces live mass broadcasts and original programming in German and is the first and largest German Catholic satellite and cable broadcast organisation operating in the DACH region. It is supported solely via private donations.

=== India ===
- Aastha TV (Hinduism)
- Divya Channel (Hinduism, Sikh)
- Sanskar TV (Hinduism, Sikh)
- ANGEL TV (Christianity)
- GOD TV ASIA (Christianity)
- JCILM TV (Christianity)
- HopeTV (Christianity)
- Islamiya (Islam)
- MH Sarrdha (Hinduism, Sikh, Jain)
- Omkar (Buddhism, Hinduism)
- PaigaamTV (Islam)
- RamrajTV (Hinduism)
- Sadana TV (Hinduism)
- Sanskar (Jainism)
- Sanskar (Sanatan Dharam, Hinduism)
- Shree Sankara (Hinduism)
- Sikha TV (Sikhism, Hinduism)
- Vadic Brobcact (Hinduism, Sikhism)

=== Indonesia ===
- MQTV
- TV MUI

=== Italy ===
- Padre Pio TV
- Telepace; HQ Cerna
- TV2000; Owned by Italian Episcopal Conference. HQ Rome.

=== Middle East ===
In the Middle East, Christian satellite broadcaster SAT-7 operates five channels, SAT-7 ARABIC, SAT-7 PARS (Farsi), SAT-7 KIDS (Arabic), SAT-7 PLUS (Arabic) and SAT-7 TÜRK (Turkish), which broadcast in the prominent languages of the region with more than 80% of programs made by and for people of the region. SAT-7's satellite footprints reach 22 countries in the Middle East and North Africa, as well as 50 countries in Europe, with "free to air" programming. SAT7, founded in 1995, is the first and largest Christian satellite broadcast organization operating in the region. It is supported by Christian churches from a variety of denominations in the Middle East and North Africa, as well as supporters from Europe, Canada , United States , and Asia.

=== Norway ===
- Visjon Norge, a Norwegian Christian television channel that broadcasts over Scandinavia.
- Kanal 10 Norge, a Norwegian Christian television channel and branch of the Swedish Kanal 10.

=== The Philippines ===
- TV Maria (owned by the Philippine Roman Catholic Church)
- Light TV 33 (owned by Jesus Is Lord Worldwide)
- Iglesia ni Cristo TV (INC TV) (owned by the indigenous sect Iglesia ni Cristo)
- Truth Channel (owned by another indigenous sect Members Church of God International)
- Sonshine Media Network International (owned by another indigenous sect Kingdom of Jesus Christ and Kingdom Light Congregation)

=== Poland ===
- TV Trwam – A Christian-national Polish educational, guide and religious TV station based in Toruń, belonging to the Lux Veritatis Foundation registered in Warsaw.

=== Pakistan ===
A function of the state-owned Pakistan Broadcasting Corporation is by law "to broadcast such programmes as may promote Islamic ideology, national unity and principles of democracy, freedom equality, tolerance and social justice as enunciated by Islam..." (s. 10(1)(b)).

- Catholic TV (Pakistan)
- Barkat TV

=== Trinidad and Tobago ===
- TV Jaagriti (Hindu); owned by the Sanatan Dharma Maha Sabha
- Sankhya Television (Hindu)
- Bhakti TV (Hindu)
- ieTV (Hindu)
- The Islamic Network (T.I.N.) (Muslim)
- Islamic Broadcast Network (Muslim)
- Trinity TV (Roman Catholic)

=== Turkey ===
Islamic broadcasters include:

- TGRT, Turkey's first nationwide "Islamic" television channel, est. 1993
- STV, affiliated with the Gülen movement, est. 1994
- Kanal 7
- Mesaj TV
- Nisa TV
- Berat TV

=== United Kingdom ===
In the UK, the first religious channel was Muslim TV Ahmadiyya, which launched in 1992. However, religious television is dominated by the main non-commercial terrestrial public service broadcaster, the BBC, obliged by its licence to broadcast 110 hours per year. Long-running programmes such as Songs of Praise continue to draw loyal audiences, although declining interest in devotional-style religious programmes — and sometimes erratic scheduling decisions — have taken their toll. Up until the turn of the century, the ITV network and Channel 4 also produced religious programme content, and for many years, Sunday evenings were dominated by 'the God slot' — a 70-minute period of religious programmes broadcast simultaneously on BBC1 and ITV. Attempts to extend the range of formats and experiment in more populist styles reached its zenith in the late 1960s with the light entertainment show, Stars on Sunday (Yorkshire Television, 1969–1979) on ITV, reaching audiences of 15 million. The show was conceived and presented by Yorkshire Television's Head of Children's Programmes, Jess Yates and ran for a decade. Serious documentary-style religious content emerged in the 1970s, with the BBC's Everyman, and ITV's Credo programme series'. Religious broadcasting declined in the later 1970s and 1980s. The birth of the fourth public service channel in 1982, with a remit to cater for minority interests, raised expectations followed by disappointment among many who believed that Channel 4 would provide new opportunities for religious broadcasting. Channel 4's first major religious programme commission caused a furore: Jesus: The Evidence (London Weekend Television for Channel 4), broadcast over the Easter period in 1984, proved to be a pivotal moment in the disintegrating relationship between the broadcasting institutions and the churches.

In 2010, the commercial public service television broadcasters de-prioritised their religious output due to commercial pressures. The 2009 Ofcom report found that religious broadcasting on public service channels was watched on average for 2.3 hours per year per viewer on the main PSB channels in 2011, 2.7 hours in 2008, reducing steadily from 3.2 in 2006 and 3.6 in 2001. In 2006, 5% of viewers found religious broadcasting to be of personal importance.

In 2017, the BBC announced that it was closing its dedicated Religious and Ethics Department and outsourcing its religious expertise and production work: a move described as 'dangerous' by at least one national newspaper, suggesting that the decision was based on a mistaken presumption that religion was 'a preoccupation of people who are old, strange or both, something of no interest to those happy enough to be neither' The BBC's decision, and the quantitative decline in religious broadcasting over several decades (as well as a growing sense that there was an absence of informed portrayals of religion in content more generally), has been implicated in what has been described as a rise in "religious illiteracy". Partly in response to these concerns, there was a major internal review at the BBC during 2017 'to reassess our role and strategy in this area, and reconsider how best to deliver our public service mission'. According to the BBC's internal report in December of that year:

In practice, that means the BBC will: Raise our game across all output – Increase specialist expertise with a new Religious Affairs Team and Religion Editor in News (p19); Create networks of specialists (p27); Develop stakeholder relations (p27); Reach as many people as possible – Landmark series and programmes (p21); Cross-genre commissions (p16), A 'Year of Beliefs' in 2019 (p23); Content and social media aimed at a next generation audience (p23); Portray the diversity of beliefs and society – Diversify our range of contributors (p14); Increase coverage of religious events (p15); Enhance portrayal in mainstream programming (p17); Help people understand their values and decisions – Innovative content that works across genres (p17); Innovative online services that include archive content that is still relevant (p25)

The BBC has yet to unveil details of plans for its 2019 'Year of Beliefs'.

Dedicated religious channels are relatively new, and transmit via direct-to-home satellite, some, are streamed live via the Internet or, like TBN, broadcast 24 hours on terrestrial Freeview. Dedicated religious channels available include:

- Daystar, US network, broadcast 24 hours on terrestrial digital freeview & Sky.
- TBN, broadcast 24 hours on terrestrial freeview and Sky.
- GOD TV, based in Sunderland (UK), is the longest established of the currently running TV channels on Sky in the UK and the only one that is also on the major cable TV systems in the UK.
- Inspiration, US Network. Programming from around the world. Preaching. Missionary bias.
- Islam Channel. Broadcasts across Europe, the Middle East and North Africa and streamed on the Internet, and will broadcast in North America. Ruled to have breached the UK broadcasting code by airing discussions containing contentious views on violence against women and marital rape in 2008 and 2009.
- Revelation TV, in London, produce a lot of live programmes from their studios.
- Let The Bible Speak

http://www.ltbs.tv

In the UK, Vision TV UK is available to viewers with Religious channels: Revelation TV, Firstlight, Good News TV, Dunamis TV, and Daystar TV. Also available are 3ABN television networks: 3ABN, 3ABN Latino, 3ABN Proclaim!, 3ABN Dare to Dream, 3ABN Français, 3ABN Russia, 3ABN Kids, and 3ABN Praise Him Music.

- VisionTV UK

http://www.visiontv.co.uk

See also List of Islamic television and radio stations in the United Kingdom

=== United States ===
Religious television stations in the United States experienced growth in the 1990s, the number of faith-based TV stations alone has tripled. The United States government does not regulate these networks to the same extent as it does commercial outlets, as the Free Exercise Clause limits how much the government can interfere in evangelism. Religious television is widely used by evangelical Christian groups, but other religions using television broadcasting is also growing. The audience for religious television is still mainly white, middle-class, evangelicals but, that is also changing as there is an increase in young Catholic viewers and Spanish-language religious television. There has also been a growth in the number and power of television preachers in the United States, particularly evangelical preachers, also known as televangelists.

In the United States, Christian organizations are by far the most widespread compared with other religions, with upwards of 1,600 television and radio stations across the country (not necessarily counting broadcast translators, though because many outlets have low power and repeat national telecasts, the difference is often hard to define).

Christian television outlets in the U.S. usually broadcast in the UHF band. While there are many religious content providers for religious and faith-based television, there are few nationally recognized non-commercial television networks—funded by soliciting donations—such as Daystar Television Network (operated by Marcus Lamb and Joni Lamb) and Trinity Broadcasting Network (TBN) (operated by Paul Crouch and Jan Crouch). Unlike the larger religious network providers available to the mass public, many smaller religious organizations have a presence on cable television systems, either with their own channels (such as the 3ABN service) or by transmissions on public-access television common for local congregations) or leased access channels. Religious programs are sometimes also transmitted on Sunday mornings by general commercial broadcasters not dedicated to religious programming. Religious broadcasters in the U.S. include:

- Catholic Media Network (Catholicism)
- Amazing Facts Television (AFTV)
- BYUtv
- Calvary Chapel
- Catholic Faith Network (formerly Telecare)
- CatholicTV
- Christian Broadcasting Network (CBN, part-time network established by Pat Robertson)
- Christian Television Network (CTN)
- Daystar
- Eternal Word Television Network (EWTN); founded by Mother Angelica
- Familyland Television Network
- GOD TV
- God's Learning Channel (GLC)
- GEB America
- Gospel Broadcasting Network
- Islamic Broadcasting Network
- Hope Channel
- It Is Written TV
- Jewish Life Television (JLTV)
- Family Broadcasting Corporation (FBC)
- Living Faith Television (LFTv)
- Loma Linda Broadcasting Network (LLBN)
- Peace TV In English, Urdu & Bangla languages
- Scientology Network
- Sonlife Broadcasting Network (SBN); outlet of Jimmy Swaggart
- Three Angels Broadcasting Network (3ABN)
- RadiantTV
- Tri-State Christian Television (TCT)
- INSP (now predominantly secular)
- Trinity Broadcasting Network (TBN)
- World Heritage Channel (WHC)
- Victory Television Network (VTN)
- Victory Channel; founded by Kenneth Copeland
- Pioneer Television Network (The Pioneer Channel) (PTN); founded by James Epperly

== Industry organizations ==
=== United Kingdom ===
The UK equivalent of the NRB is the Christian Broadcasting Council, but affiliation is much less common. Additionally in the UK is the Church and Media Network, formed in 2009 as a successor to the Churches' Media Council, which states that it seeks to be a bridge between the media and the Christian community.

=== United States ===
Christian broadcasters (but not other religions) in the U.S. are organized through the National Religious Broadcasters (NRB) organization.

== Funding ==
Financially, US channels tend to fare a lot better than UK based ones. The American concept of asking viewers to donate money to a channel to keep it going on air is considered more culturally acceptable than in the UK; as a result more money is raised this way. However this has become more contentious as television preachers have been accused of corruption and soliciting donations for their own personal use. There used to be no advertising revenue model – the traditional method of running commercial TV in the UK – that worked for religious TV channels. The UK government's Broadcasting Act 1990 allowed ownership of broadcasting licences by religious organisations and their officers and those who controlled them in some circumstances; this had previously not been allowed.

Religious channels aimed at a UK audience could get around this previous restriction by basing themselves offshore, often in a European country that permits asking viewers for money on air. Stations may appear to be based in the UK, but actually broadcast from another country. However Ofcom since lifted the restriction, and channels with UK licences can now ask for funds on air.

The other primary method for raising funds to run religious channels is to accept paid advertising. Traveling preachers and large churches and ministries often set up a TV department filming what they do; they then buy slots on TV channels to show their programmes. Often the same programme from an organization is shown on several channels at different times as they buy slots. The vast majority of organizations which do this are US-based. In the UK this tends to make Christian TV channels appear to be US-based, as most material originates there. Some UK TV channels have invested in making programmes to complement advertising, most notably GOD TV and Revelation TV.

== See also ==
- Catholic television
- Christian radio
- Christian media
- List of religious radio stations
- List of religious topics
