= Dutch public broadcasting system =

Public broadcasting system of the Netherlands

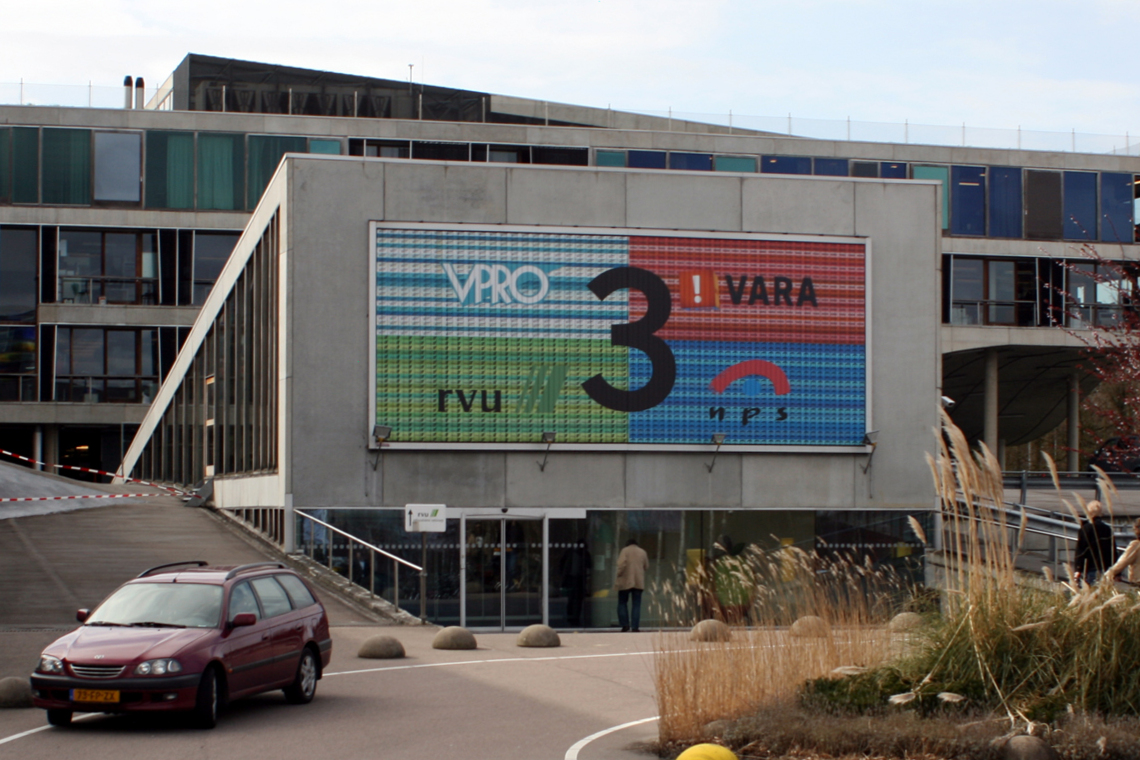
Headquarters of VPRO, VARA, RVU, and NPS in Hilversum (2007)

The Dutch public broadcasting system (Dutch: Nederlands publiek omroepbestel) is a collection of organisations responsible for public service television and radio broadcasting in the Netherlands. It consists of the Nederlandse Publieke Omroep (NPO) foundation, which serves as its governing body, and a number of public broadcasting organisations. The Media Act 2008 regulates the division of airtime and assigns the NPO's board of directors responsibility for administering the public broadcasting system. In addition to national broadcasters, the Netherlands also has regional and local public broadcasters.

Unlike most other countries – where public broadcasting organisations are structured as national corporations (such as the BBC in the United Kingdom), federations of regional bodies (such as ARD in Germany and SRG SSR in Switzerland), or competing government-funded networks with their own channels and facilities (such as ABC and SBS in Australia) – the Dutch system is built around member-based broadcasting associations that share common facilities. This model has its roots in the pillarisation of the early 20th century, in which the major religious and political groups in Dutch society – Catholics, Protestants, socialists, and liberals – each had their own associations, educational institutions, and media outlets.

The system's stated aim is to give each social group a voice. Airtime is allocated to broadcasters according to their membership numbers, with the exception of NOS and NTR. Since 2000, public broadcasting has been funded through general taxation rather than through television licence fees. This funding is supplemented by limited on-air advertising, provided by Ster, which has been permitted since 1967. Most public broadcasting organisations are based at the Media Park in Hilversum, located approximately 24 kilometres (15 miles) southeast of Amsterdam.

== History ==
=== 1920s–1950s: First broadcasting associations ===
Public broadcasting in the Netherlands traces its origins to the 1920s, when the first broadcasting associations (omroepverenigingen) were founded. From 1923, the Hilversumsche Draadlooze Omroep (HDO, lit. 'Hilversum Wireless Broadcasting'), founded by the Hilversum-based transmitter factory NSF, began broadcasting. Over the following years, the major ideological pillars of Dutch society established their own broadcasting associations: NCRV (Protestant) in 1924, KRO (Roman Catholic) and VARA (socialist) in 1925, and VPRO (free-thinking Protestant) in 1926. In 1928, HDO was reorganised into AVRO, representing a liberal identity.

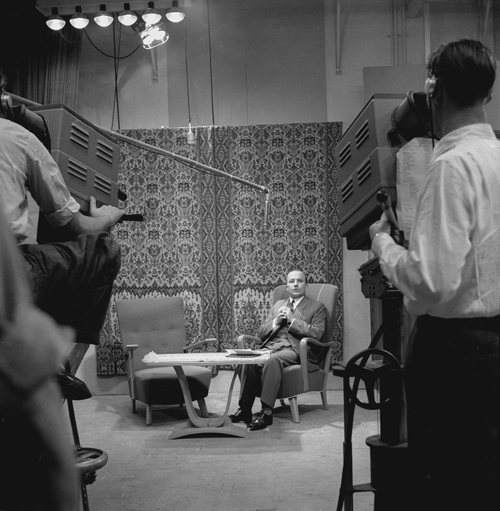
State Secretary Jo Cals during the Netherlands' first television broadcast on 2 October 1951

A formal public broadcasting system emerged with the Airtime Decree of 1930, which determined the airtime shares of organisations authorised to make public radio broadcasts. During the German occupation of the Netherlands, the authorities imposed a centralised national broadcaster (Nederlandsche Omroep), but the pre-war pluralistic system was restored after liberation in 1945. Attempts to create a single national broadcaster – similar to the BBC – never succeeded. Instead, the Dutch Radio Union (NRU) was established in 1947 as a provider of operational support to the various broadcasting associations. In 1951, the Dutch Television Foundation (NTS) was founded, serving a similar purpose for television operations and joint broadcasts. Regular television broadcasting began that same year, with the creation of the national channel Nederland 1 on which the broadcasting associations were assigned fixed time slots for their programming.

=== 1960s–1990s: Transition into an open system ===
In the 1960s, offshore commercial stations broadcasting from outside Dutch territorial waters challenged the existing system. Although these so-called pirate stations were eventually banned, their popularity prompted reforms. Following the collapse of the Marijnen cabinet over this issue, the previously closed system was transformed into an open system, allowing any association with sufficient membership to obtain broadcasting rights: at least 15,000 members for a provisional status (later heightened to 50,000), and at least 100,000 members for a permanent status. Two major offshore broadcasters subsequently entered the public broadcasting system: TV Noordzee became TROS in 1966, and Radio Veronica became the Veronica Broadcasting Organisation (VOO) in 1976.

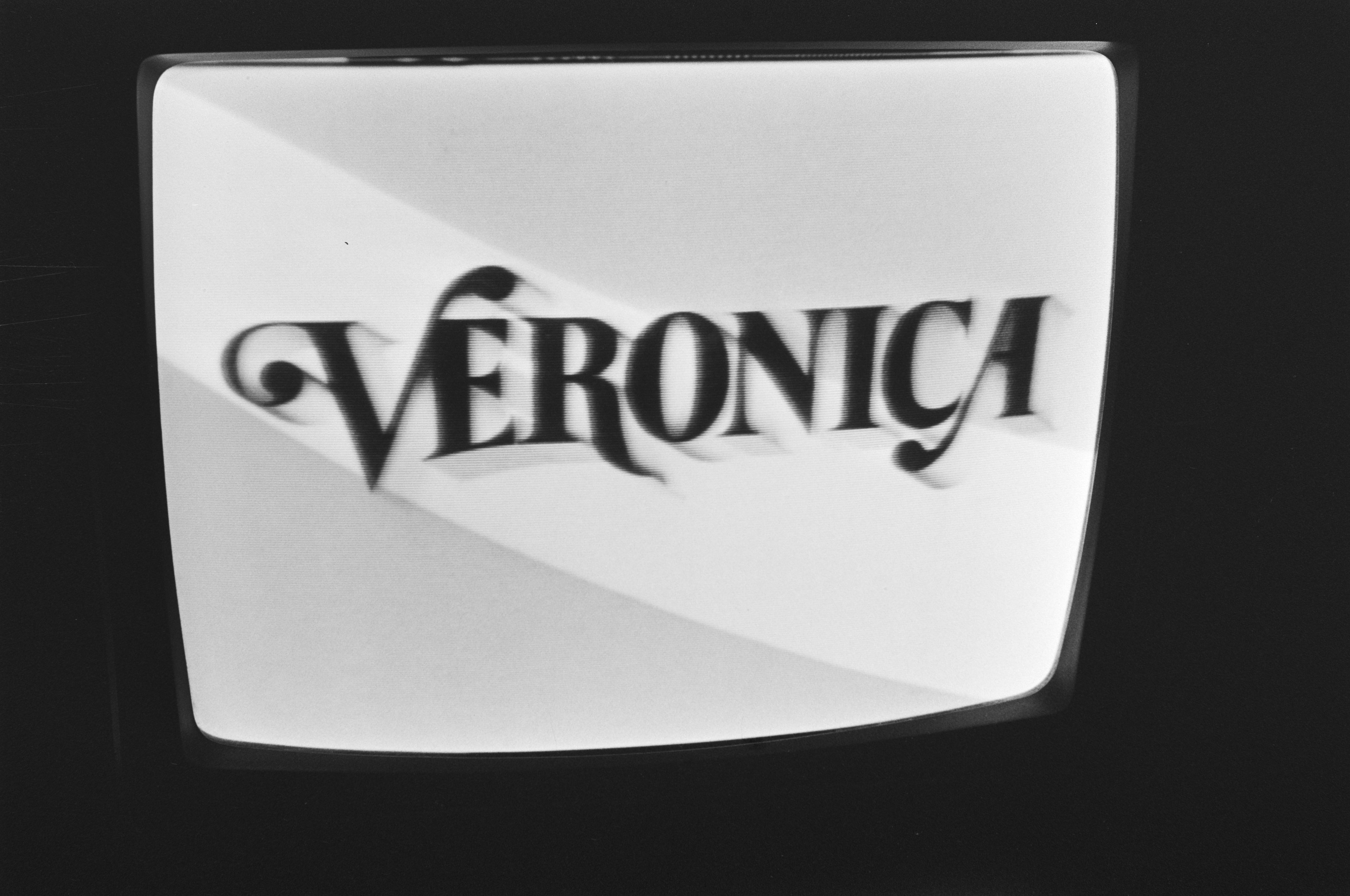
First television broadcast by the Veronica Broadcasting Organisation on 23 April 1976

This period also saw the introduction of advertising on public broadcasting channels in 1967, managed by the Ster foundation. Meanwhile, in 1969, NRU and NTS merged to form the Dutch Broadcasting Foundation (NOS), charged with providing news and sport programmes, as well as the general coordination of the public broadcasting system. The open system also enabled the rise of new broadcasters such as the Evangelische Omroep (EO), which began broadcasting in 1970.

A revised legal framework was introduced with the adoption of the Media Act 1987. Following the introduction of commercial broadcasting in 1989 and its legalisation in 1992, the public broadcasting system faced increasing competition from commercial television. Veronica subsequently left the public broadcasting system in 1995 to become a commercial broadcaster. New broadcaster BNN, founded by former Veronica staff, joined the public broadcasting system a few years later.

By the end of the 20th century, the system had developed into a structure of different types of broadcasters: on the one hand, membership-based broadcasters (ledenomroepen), which earn airtime in proportion to the number of members; and on the other hand, broadcasting foundations which do not rely on membership, but represent a purpose of cultural significance or are assigned legally defined public duties – later known as task-based broadcasters (taakomroepen). This second category included airtime for educational institutions (such as Teleac and RVU), and so-called "2.42 broadcasters" (named after Article 2.42 of the later Media Act 2008), which allowed faith-based, spiritual or humanist organisations to broadcast regardless of membership numbers.

=== 2000s–present: Major reforms and mergers ===
In 2002, responsibility for the coordination of the public broadcasting system was transferred from NOS to the newly formed NPO. According to Articles 2.2 and 2.19 of the Media Act, NPO was appointed as the governing organisation of the public broadcasting system until 2020; this concession was later extended until the end of 2031. At the time, each television broadcaster had a designated "home channel" (either Nederland 1, Nederland 2, or Nederland 3) for which they carried shared responsibility. However, a critical 2004 report concluded that the public broadcasting system lacked a unified vision and suffered from programming gaps caused by the home-channel model. As a result, this model was abolished in 2006, and the programming schedules of the three channels are now determined by NPO instead.

Opening and closing idents used for broadcasts by VPRO (2010)

From September 2010, minister Ronald Plasterk approved the entry of new broadcasting associations PowNed and Wakker Nederland (WNL) into the public broadcasting system. Another association, Omroep Max, was given a permanent status and could increase its broadcasting hours. Meanwhile, budget cuts led to the decision to reduce the number of public broadcasters by 2015, resulting in mergers of six existing broadcasters into AVROTROS, BNNVARA and KRO-NCRV. The special 2.42 broadcasters, including Human, IKON, and the Joodse Omroep, continued to operate until the category was abolished in 2016, after which Human transitioned to a membership-based status.

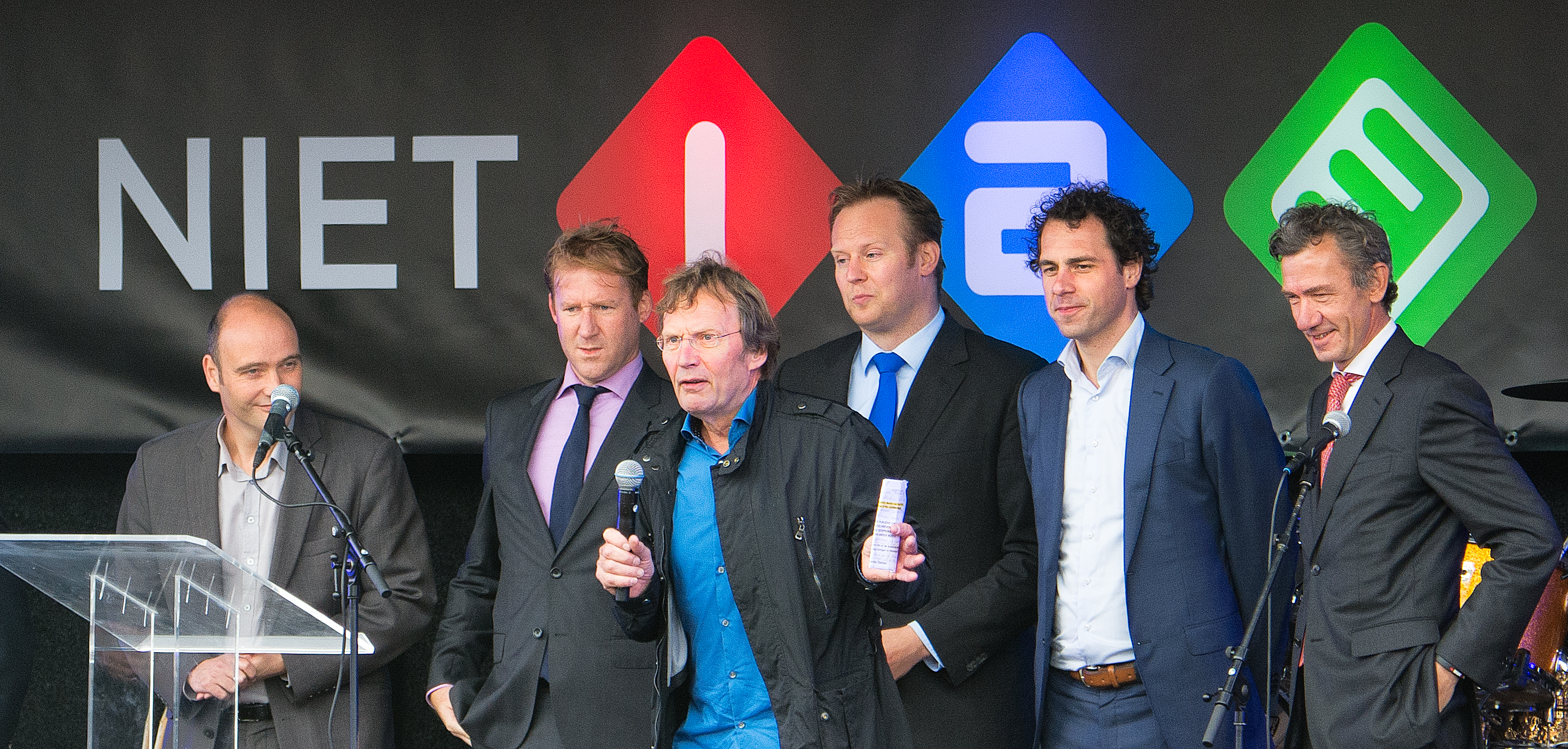
Politicians at a 2013 protest against budget cuts to the public broadcasting system

In 2022, two new broadcasters – Omroep Zwart and Ongehoord Nederland (ON) – reached the threshold of 50,000 members, and were granted provisional status in the public broadcasting system by minister Arie Slob. ON's news programme Ongehoord Nieuws drew significant controversy for providing a platform to far-right viewpoints and spreading misinformation, prompting renewed debate about the structure of the public broadcasting system. The government established the Advisory Committee on Public Broadcasting, chaired by Pieter van Geel, which concluded in its 2023 report Eenheid in veelzijdigheid (transl. 'Unity in diversity') that the pillarised structure of the system no longer reflected contemporary Dutch society. In 2024, a committee chaired by Martin van Rijn examined misconduct within public broadcasting organisations. It argued that competition between broadcasters contributed to unsafe working environments and recommended considering structural reforms.

In April 2025, minister Eppo Bruins announced a reform of the public broadcasting system to take effect in 2029, requiring the existing membership-based broadcasting associations to merge into four or five joint administrative bodies known as "broadcasting houses" (omroephuizen). That same month, AVROTROS and PowNed declared their intention to establish a joint broadcasting house, followed in September 2025 by EO, Human and VPRO. In February 2026, it was announced that BNNVARA and Omroep Zwart would form a broadcasting house, provided that Omroep Zwart obtains a permanent status in the public broadcasting system. KRO-NCRV, Omroep Max and WNL made a similar announcement on 1 April 2026. A comparable organisational merger is being explored for the task-based broadcasting foundations NOS and NTR. If such a merger does not materialise, NTR will be required to join one of the other broadcasting houses.

Consequently, ON remains the sole broadcaster not due to join a broadcasting house, as the other broadcasters have ruled out an affiliation with ON. On 8 September 2026, the Jetten cabinet announced its intention to revoke ON's broadcasting licence following repeated violations of media regulations. Three days later, on 11 September 2026, minister Rianne Letschert unveiled the finalised reform plans for the public broadcasting system. The proposal permanently closes the door to any new aspiring broadcasters and scraps the rule requiring broadcasters to prove their legitimacy through membership numbers. To preserve identity, the newly formed broadcasting houses will retain full flexibility over branding: they can keep their established broadcast names, create a unified new identity, or run multiple distinct brand names under one umbrella. Furthermore, the plan reduces the authority of NPO, granting the broadcasting houses greater autonomy over scheduling and programming decisions.

Proposed broadcasting houses
Broadcasting house 1	Broadcasting house 2	Broadcasting house 3	Broadcasting house 4	NOS
AVROTROS; PowNed	BNNVARA; Omroep Zwart	EO; Human; VPRO	KRO-NCRV; Omroep Max; WNL	NOS; NTR

== List of public broadcasters ==
=== Membership-based broadcasters ===
Broadcaster	Start	Members (2021)	Identity
AVROTROS	2014	315,000	Popularist, general-interest
BNNVARA	2017	407,000	Progressive, left-leaning
EO	1970	320,000	Evangelical Protestant
Human	2016	90,205	Humanist
KRO-NCRV	2014	401,863	Christian values-based
Omroep Max	2005	406,691	Senior-oriented
PowNed	2010	58,027	Provocative, youth-oriented
VPRO	1926	273,618	Progressive, intellectual
WNL	2010	62,000	Liberal-conservative

==== Aspiring broadcasters ====
Broadcaster	Start	Members (2021)	Identity
Omroep Zwart	2022	57,732	Diversity-focused
ON	2022	55,300	National-conservative

=== Task-based broadcasters ===
Broadcaster	Start	Content
NOS	1969	News, sports, and important live events
NTR	2010	Educational and balanced cultural programming

=== Advertising ===
Broadcaster	Start	Content
Socutera	1964	Charity fundraising
Ster	1967	Commercials
Zendtijd voor Politieke Partijen	1925	Political advertisements

=== Former broadcasters ===
Broadcaster	Start	End	Identity or purpose	Notes
AVRO	1923	2014	Liberal	Merged into AVROTROS
BNN	1998	2017	Youth-oriented	Merged into BNNVARA
KRO	1925	2015	Roman Catholic	Merged into KRO-NCRV
Llink	2005	2010	Environmentalist	Lost its broadcasting licence
NCRV	1924	2015	Protestant	Merged into KRO-NCRV
NOT	1963	1996	Educational programming	Merged into Teleac/NOT
NPS	1995	2010	Cultural and children's programming	Merged into NTR
NRU	1947	1969	Shared services (radio)	Merged into NOS
NTS	1951	1969	Shared services (television), news	Merged into NOS
RVU	1932	2010	Educational programming	Merged into NTR
Teleac	1963	1996	Educational programming	Merged into Teleac/NOT
Teleac/NOT	1996	2010	Educational programming	Merged into NTR
TROS	1966	2014	Popular entertainment	Merged into AVROTROS
VARA	1925	2017	Socialist	Merged into BNNVARA
Veronica	1976	1995	Youth-oriented	Left the public broadcasting system

==== 2.42 broadcasters ====
Broadcaster	Start	End	Denomination	Notes
BOS	2001	2015	Buddhism	Integrated into KRO-NCRV
Convent van Kerken	1957	1975	Protestant churches	Merged into IKON
Human	1989	2015	Humanism	Continued as a membership-based broadcaster
IKON	1976	2015	Protestant churches	Integrated into EO
IKOR	1946	1975	Protestant churches	Merged into IKON
Joodse Omroep	1973	2015	Judaism	Integrated into EO
Moslim Omroep	2013	2015	Islam	Integrated into NTR
NIO	2005	2009	Islam	Shared airtime with NMO; dissolved in 2009
NMO	1993	2009	Islam	Shared airtime with NIO since 2005; dissolved in 2009
OHM	1993	2015	Hinduism	Integrated into NTR
RKK	1956	2015	Catholic Church	Integrated into KRO-NCRV
Zendtijd voor Kerken	1976	2015	Protestant churches	Integrated into EO

=== Regional public broadcasters ===
In addition to national broadcasters, the Netherlands also has regional public broadcasters. Among them, Omrop Fryslân holds a special position: it receives dedicated airtime on the national channel NPO 2 to support and promote the West Frisian language and culture.

- L1 (Limburg)
- NH (North Holland)
- Omroep Brabant (North Brabant)
- Omroep Flevoland (Flevoland)
- Omroep Gelderland (Gelderland)
- Omroep West (northern South Holland)
- Omroep Zeeland (Zeeland)
- Omrop Fryslân (Friesland)
- RTV Drenthe (Drenthe)
- RTV Noord (Groningen)
- RTV Oost (Overijssel)
- RTV Rijnmond (Greater Rotterdam region)
- RTV Utrecht (Utrecht)

== Channels ==
The Dutch public broadcasting system centres on three flagship television channels, each with its own remit:

- NPO 1 – Serves the broadest audience, offering news, major live events, and popular entertainment.
- NPO 2 – Provides more in-depth and reflective programming, including documentaries, cultural coverage, and current-affairs analysis.
- NPO 3 – Focuses on younger viewers with innovative formats, drama, and experimental content.

In addition, its main radio stations are:

- NPO Radio 1 – The primary news and sports channel, known for continuous current-affairs coverage and live reporting.
- NPO Radio 2 – Offers mainstream music and accessible entertainment.
- NPO 3FM – Highlights new music, alternative genres, and emerging artists, maintaining a strong focus on youth culture.

== See also ==
- Television in the Netherlands
- Digital television in the Netherlands
- Media of the Netherlands
- List of radio stations in the Netherlands
- Programadora – a similar system in Colombia that utilized private companies to provide programmes to the state broadcaster.
