= Renée Scheltema =

Dutch film director

- Education: University of Leiden; University of California, Berkeley
- Occupations: Documentary filmmaker; photographer
- Website: reneescheltema.com

Renée Scheltema is a Dutch documentary filmmaker and photographer, living in Cape Town, South Africa. She has been making documentaries for 35 years.

== Biography and works ==
After her Bachelor of Law and Doctorandus degree in Criminology, she received her Masters at the School of Journalism at the University of California, Berkeley. Her main subjects were TV journalism and photojournalism.

In 2019, the new updated version of Normal Is Over The Movie 1.1 was completed, as the message of this independent award-winning documentary is 'becoming more relevant'. Normal Is Over has its focus on humanity's wisest response to climate change, species extinction, resource depletion, income inequality, and the link between these issues. This independent film investigates the financial and economic paradigm underlying planetary problems.

Funding for the updated version has been provided by The New Normal Foundation.

In August 2015, after 4 years of working as a one-woman film-crew, Scheltema completed the previous 120-minute feature version of the film Normal Is Over The Movie 1.1, which was self-financed.

Normal is Over received the Grand Educational Award, Cine Eco Film Festival, Best in Show Award, Cinema Verde Film Festival, and the Honorable Mention Award, Tasmanian Eco Film Festival. It was selected to screen at 13 film festivals, like the Wild & Scenic Film Festival USA, Princeton International Film Festival, The Santa Cruz Film Festival, Environmental Film Festival Spain, Greenmotions Film Fest, in Germany, South African Eco Film Festival, and Sonoma International Film Festival, USA.

For many years, Scheltema worked for Dutch television as a documentary film director, producer, camera person and editor: NOS International Affairs Programme, NCRV, AVRO, Human TV, TROS, Veronica, IKON, VPRO, and BOS, Buddhist Broadcasting Station. Many documentaries were co-produced with TV and non-governmental organizations such as SNV, UNDP, UNESCO, and Amnesty International. Scheltema has always focused on social issues, sustainable development, art and the protection of the environment.

Her art series "Canvas Extreme" consists of seven 30-minute portraits of artists filmed during the Mandela era in South Africa and was sold to TV stations in France, Spain, Mexico, Switzerland, and the Netherlands.

Other documentaries include Happy in Zimbabwe?, Portrait of a Zen couple, and Een Gezelig Gesprek, and Portrait of Nicolaas Pierson.

Scheltema's 2009 award-winning feature documentary Something Unknown Is Doing We Don't Know What investigates the science behind psychic experiences, featuring top scientists in the US, such as Prof. Charles Tart, Dr. Dean Radin, Dr. Rupert Sheldrake, and Harold E. Puthoff. This film has been selected at many film festivals, and has been distributed worldwide. Scheltema also wrote a book called Something Unknown, which is available on Amazon. The book has been translated into Dutch and is called "Iets Bekends Doet Iets Onverwachts".

== Film festivals ==
Normal Is Over The Movie 1.1

- Fragments Film Festival, London, UK, June 2019

Normal Is Over, First version

- Cinema Verde Environmental Film Festival Florida, October 2016: Best in Show Award
- Tasmanian Eco Film Festival, 2016: Honorable Mention Award
- Official Selection Cine Eco Film Festival Portugal, October 2016: Grand Environmental Education Prize
- Official Selection Sonoma International Film Festival, April 2017
- Official Selection South African Eco Film Festival, March 2017
- Official Selection Wild and Scenic Film Festival California, January 2016
- Official Selection International Environmental Film Festival Spain
- Official Selection Princeton Independent Film Festival
- Official Selection Green Motion Film Festival, Germany, November 2016
- Official Selection Film festival Freiburg, November 2016
- Official Selection International Kuala Lumpur Eco Festival, October 2016
- Official Selection IMFF Rostov, Russia, August 2016
- Official Selection Santa Cruz Film Festival, June 2016

Something Unknown Is Doing We Don't Know What

- Arizona International Film Festival. April 2009: Special Jury Award for feature documentary
- Santa Fe Film Festival
- Globians Doc Fest Berlin, August 2009
- The Feel Good Film Festival, Los Angeles
- Spirit Quest Film Festival, Edinboro University of Pennsylvania
- Silk City Film Festival
- Durban International Film Festival, South Africa, 2010
- Cosmic Cine Festival, Germany, 2012

Hush, A Portrait of Tracy Payne

- Asolo Art Film Festival, 2001
- International Festival for Woman Films, Paris, 2000

Other films

- “Seven Days in Burma”, a co-production with TV, UNDP and UNESCO, festival: Donostia (Spain)
- “The Death Penalty”, a co-production with TV and Amnesty International, festival: Monte Carlo
- “The Bus”, with WWF-Table Mountain Fund and the National Botanical Gardens in South Africa, festival: WSSD Film Festival Johannesburg, 2002
- "A Zen couple in the Western Cape", festival: European TV Festival of Rel. Progr. Norway.

== Photography ==
Scheltema is a professional photographer and has been working for magazines and newspapers in the Netherlands, the United States, and South Africa. She was a member of Gamma Liaison in New York City (now called Getty Images).

Exhibition: "More than Clogs and Tulips", a portrait of filmmaker Theo Van Gogh. A unique collection of photographic moments presented by the Dutch consulate in Cape Town, 2008.

Exhibition: "Streetkids" in Cape Town, curated by The Homestead.

== Degrees ==
- Bachelor at Law. University of Leiden, Netherlands
- Drs. Criminology. University of Leiden, Netherlands
- M.A. School of Journalism. University of California, Berkeley, USA
