= Ongehoord Nederland =

Dutch public broadcaster

- Formation: 25 November 2019; 6 years ago
- Founder: Ybeltje Berckmoes; Arnold Karskens; Pepijn van Houwelingen; Haye van der Heyden; Joost Niemöller
- Type: Public broadcaster
- Legal status: Association
- Members: 38,818 (31 December 2024)
- Editor-in-chief: Vacant
- CEO: Peter Vlemmix
- Website: Official website

Ongehoord Nederland (ON or ON!, lit. 'Unheard Netherlands') is a Dutch public broadcaster. ON was founded in 2019 and entered the public broadcasting system in 2022. It frames itself as an alternative for the mainstream media and is generally associated with the radical right.

== History ==
=== Founding (2019–2021) ===
The idea for ON arose in a conversation in September 2019 between former war correspondent Arnold Karskens and publicist Joost Niemöller. Since 2017, Karskens had complained in his Zwartboek NOS Journaal about what he called one-sided reporting of the NOS Journaal. According to Karskens, "ON should stand up for people who advocate for Dutch culture, are critical of the EU, immigration, and the current plans to combat climate change." The broadcaster was founded on 25 November 2019, with former VVD MP Ybeltje Berckmoes and scenarist Haye van der Heyden as co-founders. Their effort was supported by radical right parties Party for Freedom (PVV) and Forum for Democracy (FvD).

To join the Dutch public broadcasting system, ON needed to gain 50,000 members by 1 January 2020. They achieved this goal in mid-December. This milestone would have allowed them to enter the system in January 2021, but the ongoing concession was extended by a year. The Council for Culture, the Nederlandse Publieke Omroep, and the Dutch Media Authority all provided positive advice, despite strong objections. Concerns were raised that ON might use public funds to undermine the credibility of the NPO and the NOS. In July 2021, minister Arie Slob granted ON permission to enter as an aspirant broadcaster starting 1 January 2022 for a five-year period.

=== Controversies and fines (2022–2024) ===
Shortly after launching, ON sparked controversy. The public broadcasting system's ombudsman determined that ON had violated the journalistic code within its first three months. Among the reasons cited was the insufficient rebuttal provided by journalists to guests in the programme Ongehoord Nieuws (lit. 'Unheard News'). This included promoting conspiracy theories such as omvolking and the claim that the West provoked the Russian invasion of Ukraine. Following the ombudsman's conclusion, the NPO fined ON 2.5% of their 3.6 million budget.

In September 2022, another significant incident occurred when Ongehoord Nieuws aired a clip alleging a racist incident where "whites are being beaten up by niggers". However, Pointer, an investigative journalism platform by KRO-NCRV, found no evidence supporting an anti-white motive for the violence. The other public broadcasters condemned ON's reporting, with the KRO-NCRV director even calling for ON's removal as a public broadcaster. The NPO subsequently fined ON for this incident.

In January 2023, the NPO announced a third fine after the ombudsman determined that the second season of Ongehoord Nieuws had again violated the journalistic code. This was followed in April 2023 by an NPO request to the state secretary to remove ON from the public broadcasting system. However, in November 2023, state secretary Gunay Uslu announced that there were insufficient legal grounds for such a far-reaching decision. The NPO later retracted the last two fines to give the broadcaster space "to meet the requirements set for all public broadcasters".

=== Internal crisis (2025) ===
Ongehoord Nieuws presenter Raisa Blommestijn left the broadcaster in January 2025, after she was asked by Karskens to moderate her tone on social media. A few months earlier, she had made offensive remarks on X about someone's race, for which she was later convicted. Around the same time, five complaints were filed against media director Peter Vlemmix, but after talks with employees, Vlemmix cleared the air. Karskens, meanwhile, attempted to dismiss a freelance employee he deemed antisemitic. However, this action was thwarted by his fellow board members, Vlemmix and Nienke van Herksen.

In July 2025, while Karskens was absent, Blommestijn approached Vlemmix and Van Herksen to accuse Karskens of humiliations and insults. A week later, an anonymous letter circulated, alleging that Karskens fostered a toxic culture and suppressed criticism of the Schoof cabinet, which had recently been formed. Although the supervisory board claimed that Blommestijn was not the author, attributing the letter to 14 other current and former employees, Karskens, Herskens, and other employees recognised Blommestijn's style in the text. A subsequent letter from employees opposing the first letter was disregarded by the supervisory board. Instead, Karskens was suspended and later dismissed and expelled. Blommestijn was allowed to return.

Replacing Karskens as editor-in-chief in early 2025 was co-founder Niemöller, who had left the broadcaster early on because he thought Karskens was too restrictive. His appointment caused commotion because he had advocated for mandatory vaccination during the COVID-19 pandemic. Members, including Gideon van Meijeren and two of the three members of the supervisory board, left.

=== Discriminatory job posting and Hitler video (2026) ===
In June 2026, the Netherlands Institute for Human Rights ruled that a 2024 job posting by ON was discriminatory for specifying a need for a man or a woman, "not an 'X'". The Institute determined that the advertisement violated the right to equal access to employment regardless of sex or gender, which overrides the broadcaster's freedom of expression. The Public Prosecution Service had previously investigated the case following numerous complaints, but concluded ON was not criminally liable due to its status as a broadcasting association.

Two months later, ON again sparked public outrage after airing a broadcast which showed an antisemitic speech by Adolf Hitler to discuss criticism of a 'disconnected cosmopolitan elite'. In the video, Niemöller remarked that Hitler expressed certain points "just very well" and acknowledged holding some of the same views. ON subsequently parted ways with Niemöller as editor-in-chief. The Dutch Media Authority declared that the incident reflected a persistent failure to meet journalistic standards. Citing a complete loss of confidence in the broadcaster's ability to fulfill its public media mandate, the Authority advised culture minister Rianne Letschert to revoke ON's broadcasting licence. On 8 September 2026, Letschert announced her intention to do so.

== Personnel ==
=== Editor-in-chief ===
- Arnold Karskens (–2024)
- Joost Niemöller (2025–2026)

=== Board ===
Past members of ON's board included:

- Harm Beertema (2024, ad interim
- Reinette Klever (2020–2024)
- Peter Vlemmix (2019–present, since 2024 as CEO)

=== Controversies ===
Over the years, several prominent members of ON left because of controversies. Co-founder Van der Heyden left in December 2019, after he had stated in an interview that ON would be open to all opinions, including defending pedosexuality or denying the Holocaust. Chair of ON's supervisory board, Taco Dankers, left in November 2021 after NRC had revealed antisemitic statements made by him and a foundation led by him. His successor, Gert Jan Mulder, left in November 2024 after de Volkskrant revealed discriminatory statements. Member of the supervisory board Rob Legeland resigned as well in November 2024, after de Volkskrant revealed discriminatory and racist statements.

== Programmes ==
In 2020 and 2021, ON created their own Black Pete show, after the Sinterklaasjournaal had stopped using Black Pete. Because they were not yet a public broadcaster, the show was broadcast on YouTube and on their own website. The programme was not allowed on television after they had become a public broadcaster.

In February 2022, the aspirant broadcaster started with its first television programme Ongehoord Nieuws, twice a week around lunch time. It started out positioning itself as news programme, but this was changed to opinion programme in August 2022. Presenters of the show include Raisa Blommestijn (2023–2024, 2024–present) and Arlette Adriani.
