= List of international religious radio broadcasters =

International religious radio broadcasters broadcast from a host nation to another nation or nations in order to deliver a religious message which either cannot be delivered by stations located within the target area or are intended to supplement internal transmissions. The following is a list of such operations with links to entries about each one.

== A ==
- Adventist World Radio
- Ancient Faith Radio

== B ==
- Buddhist Broadcasting Foundation
- Bible Broadcasting Network Charlotte, North Carolina–based network of domestic FM and AM radio stations (most of which, have the letters YF in their call signs). BBN also operates stations in Latin America and produces programming in several languages including Chinese, Japanese, Korean, and Russian.

== C ==
- Catholic Media Network Philippines
- Christian Era Broadcasting Service International Philippines

== E ==
- ERF – "Evangeliums-Rundfunk" Protestant evangelical broadcaster based in Wetzlar, Germany, formerly with a powerful (800kW) AM radio station, originally targeting Communist East Germany, it can be heard throughout Central Europe with German language programming. (Article at German Wikipedia). Early Partner of TWR.
- EWTN "Eternal Word Television Network" Roman Catholic radio and television broadcaster based in Irondale, Alabama. Operates shortwave station WEWN.

== F ==
- Far East Broadcasting Company (FEBC), Headquarters in La Mirada, California
- Family Radio Oakland, California–based broadcaster with a large network of domestic stations, and distributes programming in 15 languages via satellite and shortwave station WYFR in Okeechobee, Florida
- Fundamental Broadcasting Network – Headquartered in New Bern, North Carolina, this Independent Baptist broadcaster serves the United States with a network consisting of mostly FM radio stations, and the rest of the world via shortwave radio station WTJC, satellite, and the internet.

== H ==
- HCJB World Radio, Quito, Ecuador

== K ==
- KTLW Radio Network

== L ==
Lancashire's Lighthouse Radio

== M ==
- Mormon Channel

== R ==
- Radio Maria, an Italian Catholic broadcasting network.
- Radio Teos (Radio Theos) is a Russian radio station that previously broadcast on medium waves in Russia, as well as for Russophones in Estonia, Finland, and Manchuria. Later, it broadcast from the Philippines to many countries on shortwave, and currently broadcasts on the Korea on medium wave.
- Radio Vera (Radio Faith) is a Russian radio station broadcasting in Russia, Moldova, and illegally in Ukraine (in the occupied territories)
- Radio Veritas (RVA), a Catholic broadcasting station, Philippines.

== S ==
- Shortwave Radio – The majority of privately owned shortwave stations in the United States have broadcast brokered religious programming. See List of American shortwave broadcasters.
- Sonshine Media Network International Philippines

== T ==
- Three Angels Broadcasting Network – Based in West Frankfort, Illinois, 3ABN Radio and 3ABN Latino Radio broadcasting from their studios located in the United States of America, while 3ABN Russia Radio broadcasting from their 3ABN Russian Branch in Nizhny Novgorod, Russia, transmitting their programming via satellite to radio stations, Internet, mobile devices, etc.
- Trans World Radio – broadcasting from various studios with its headquarters located in the United States of America, it transmits its programs by a network of terrestrial transmitters in various countries linked by satellite.
- Trinity Broadcasting Network Based in Santa Ana, California, they program an extensive network of television stations in the United States, along with cable television networks in both the United States and Europe.

== U ==
- United Christian Broadcasters

== V ==
- Vatican Radio
- Voice of Orthodoxy is a Russian-language radio station that broadcast from 1979 to 2012 in different countries of the world (first in France, then in Gabon, Portugal, Lebanon, Germany, Russia, Kazakhstan)

== W ==
- World Harvest Radio International

== Z ==
- ZOE Broadcasting Network (ZBNI), Headquarters in Pasig, Philippines
