= Radio Nordsee International =

Radio Nordsee International may refer to:

- Radio Northsea, Radio Noordzee, now called TROS, broadcast from a man made island in 1964
- Radio North Sea, name used by Radio Veronica for Robbie Dale's English-language broadcasts in 1968 and 1969
- Radio Noordzee International, 1970's Swiss radio station owned by Edwin Bollier & Erwin Meister, and operated by Robin Banks
