= Radio Noordzee =

Radio Noordzee may refer to:

- a radio station broadcasting from the REM Island in 1964 (alongside TV Noordzee)
- Radio Noordzee Internationaal, broadcasting from the vessel Mebo II from 1970 to 1974
- Dutch commercial radio station Radio Noordzee (free radio), broadcasting from 1988 - 1999 on FM in the Netherlands
