= Scheltema =

Scheltema is a surname. Notable people with the surname include:

- Amelie Hains Scheltema (1928–2015), American malacologist
- Renée Scheltema (born 1951), Dutch documentary filmmaker
- Jan Hendrik Scheltema (1861–1941), Dutch, later Australian painter; first portraitist, in Australia landscape and livestock painter.
