= Dutch Public Broadcasting =

Dutch Public Broadcasting can refer to:

- Dutch public broadcasting system
- Nederlandse Publieke Omroep (organization) (abbr. NPO), Dutch organization administering the above-listed Dutch public broadcasting system
