= Refresh =

Refresh may refer to:

- Refresh rate, the rate at which a display illuminates
- Meta refresh, an HTML tag
- Memory refresh, reading and writing to the same area of computer memory
- Refreshable braille display, a device for blind computer users
- USS Refresh (AM-287), an Admirable-class minesweeper built for the U.S. Navy during World War II
- Refresh (EP), mini album by South Korean girl group CLC
- "Refresh!", song by Chinese singer Zhang Hao
- Refresh FM, Christian radio station in South and Central Manchester, England
- Refresh UK, a brewing business started in 2000
