= Joost Niemöller =

Dutch writer and journalist

- Niemöller in 2015
- Born: 25 February 1957 (age 69); Haarlem, Netherlands
- Education: University of Amsterdam
- Occupations: Writer, journalist

Joost Niemöller (born 25 February 1957) is a Dutch writer and former journalist.

== Biography ==
Niemöller earned a candidate's diploma in Dutch studies at the University of Amsterdam, but did not graduate as a Dutch scholar. He then worked as a journalist for various media outlets, including De Pers, De Groene Amsterdammer, Nieuwe Revu, De Dagelijkse Standaard, and HP/De Tijd, and was editor-in-chief for the music magazine Vinyl.

In 1984, Niemöller made his literary debut with the short story collection De dood, de stad, de rug tegen de muur (English: Death, the City, the Back Against the Wall). Between 1989 and 2010, six novels followed. In 1990, he was nominated for the AKO Literatuurprijs for his novel Wraak! (English: Revenge!).

In 2010, he started his own weblog, De Nieuwe Realist (English: The New Realist). On this blog, Niemöller would begin sharing dissenting opinions and disseminate conspiracy theories. His participation in the NCRV program Lunch! was terminated in 2013, following a controversial article he wrote about the influence of race on crime and intelligence.

In 2014, Niemöller wrote a non-fiction book about the shootdown of Malaysia Airlines Flight 17 during the Russo-Ukrainian war, in which he places responsibility for the incident on Ukraine.

In February 2016, Niemöller attracted scrutiny for defending the freedom of speech of the convicted Holocaust denier David Irving, whom he called, in addition to an antisemite, "one of the most important historians of WWII".

In 2018, he was one of the speakers at a meeting organized and funded by farmer and political activist Hugo Jansen at De Balie, where criticism was leveled at the Western media and the geopolitical role of Russia was defended. Following the Russian invasion of Ukraine in 2022, he remained faithful to the Russian view of a "special military operation".

In 2019, he co-founded Ongehoord Nederland (ON) with Arnold Karskens, but he left the broadcaster shortly afterwards, following the dismissal of Haye van der Heyden.

On 13 February 2025, Niemöller was appointed editor-in-chief of ON. His departure was announced on 1 September 2026, amidst commotion over an online broadcast in which Niemöller and commentator Raisa Blommestijn had expressed their agreement with selected statements by Adolf Hitler.

== Bibliography ==
=== Fiction ===
- De dood, de stad, de rug tegen de muur (English: Death, the City, the Back Against the Wall). 1984. ISBN 9062651577 – Short stories
- Wraak! (English: Revenge!). 1989. ISBN 9035107276 – Novel
- De spier (English: The Muscle) 1993. ISBN 903511308X – Novel
- De therapie (English: The Therapy) 1997. ISBN 9021476991 – Novel
- Broers (English: Brothers) 2002. ISBN 9023400194 – Novel
- Deltablues (English: Delta Blues) 2008. ISBN 9023427777 – Novel
- De maand erna (English: The Month After) 2010. ISBN 902345796X – Novel

=== Non-fiction ===
- Over de muur: Oostduitse levensverhalen (English: Over the Wall: East German Life Stories). 1991. ISBN 9035110293
- Het immigratietaboe: 10 wetenschappers over de feiten (English: The Immigration Taboo: 10 Scientists on the Facts). 2011. ISBN 9049024092
- MH17: De Doofpotdeal (English: MH17: The Cover-up Deal). 2014. ISBN 9049024173
- De verschrikkelijke Janmaat: Nederland en de Centrumpartij (English: The Terrible Janmaat: The Netherlands and the Centre Party). 2015. ISBN 9049024203
- Kwaad: Nederlanders over immigranten (English: Angry: The Dutch on Immigrants). 2017. ISBN 904902422X
- De ontworsteling: In de greep van de Marokkaanse overheid, geheime diensten en de islam (English: The Struggle to Break Free: In the Grip of the Moroccan Government, Secret Services, and Islam) with Ali Lahrouchi, 2019. ISBN 9492161877
