= Interkerkelijke Omroep Nederland =

Dutch public broadcaster

IKON
- Type: Public broadcaster
- Country: Netherlands
- Availability: Netherlands
- Founded: 1 January 1976
- Dissolved: 1 January 2016
- Official website: ikon.nl

The Interkerkelijke Omroep Nederland (IKON) was a Dutch public broadcaster which made radio and television broadcasts on behalf of seven church communities. IKON also offered other services such as Teletekst, the IKON newspaper, the IKON pastorate and Internet. In IKON's airtime, the Wilde Ganzen collected money for projects in the Third World.

In May 2004, IKON adopted its final logo. IKON was finally closed down on 1 January 2016, thus transferring its programs to EO.

== History ==
After the war the IKOR (Interkerkelijk Overleg inzake Radioaangelegenheden) was founded. On 1 January 1976 IKOR and the Convent van Kerken founded the foundation IKON.

IKON journalists were often active in dangerous warzones. On 17 March 1982 four IKON journalists were murdered in El Salvador: Koos Koster (correspondent), Jan Kuiper (editor), Joop Willemse (cameraman) en Hans ter Laag (soundman).

In the 1970s and '80s IKON was known as a left-wing broadcaster, focussing on subjects such as racism, oppression, emancipation, development aid and peace.

Since the end of the Cold War the appeal of leftist ideals declined as did the attendance of churches. IKON had to adapt to these changes.

== Airtime for churches ==
IKON was one of the "2.42 broadcasters" (named after the Article 2.42 of the Mediawet, the Dutch media law, which allowed faith-based broadcasters to get airtime on radio and TV without having to have any members). These broadcasters were extinct on 1 January 2016, due to cuts at the Dutch public broadcasting system.

IKON made programming for various church communities namely:

- Algemene Doopsgezinde Sociëteit
- Evangelische Broedergemeente Nederland
- Leger des Heils
- Molukse Evangelische Kerk
- Oud-Katholieke Kerk van Nederland
- Protestantse Kerk in Nederland (PKN)
- Remonstrantse Broederschap
- Vrijzinnige Geloofsgemeenschap NPB

Two other organisations who filled airtime for different church societies were RKK (now part of KRO-NCRV) and Zendtijd voor Kerken (ZvK). IKON took care of part of the technical facilities of ZvK until the closure of both broadcasters.
