= TV Noordzee =

Pirate television station

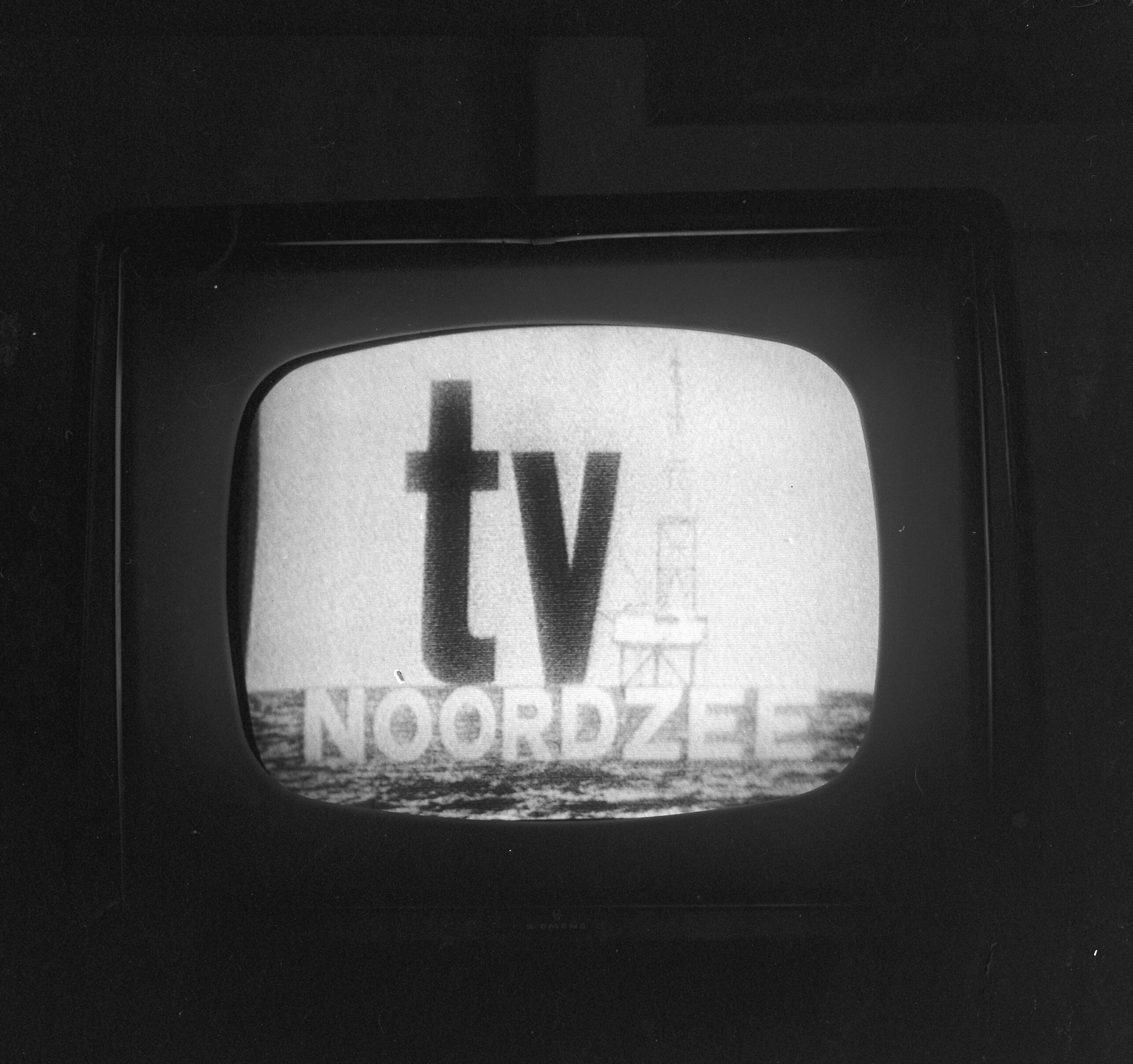
- Station identification featuring the REM Island's platform
- Country: Netherlands
- Broadcast area: Western Netherlands, namely much of North Holland, South Holland and parts of Zeeland, Utrecht and North Brabant
- Headquarters: REM Island

Programming
- Language: Dutch
- Picture format: PAL 576i

Ownership
- Owner: Reclame Exploitatie Maatschapij

History
- Launched: September 1, 1964; 62 years ago
- Closed: December 12, 1964; 61 years ago
- Replaced by: TROS

Availability

Terrestrial
- VHF transmitter from the REM Island: Channel 11

TV Noordzee (Dutch for "TV North Sea") was a pirate television station broadcasting out of the controversial REM Island. The station challenged the Dutch TV monopoly of the time, with the airing of commercials and foreign imports (mainly British and American). Its popularity led to the government raiding its facilities, dismantling the island and reintegrating most of the assets to the public sector, continuing its operations as TROS.

== History ==
In the early 1960s, there was only one television channel in the Netherlands. Airtime was divided between the six members of the Dutch public broadcasting system of the time (AVRO, VARA, NCRV, KRO, VPRO and NTS) and commercial advertising was strictly forbidden. The rise in offshore radio stations led to the creation of alternative broadcasters such as Veronica and REM, the latter of which started a radio station. After starting Radio Noordzee in June 1964, the backers of the Reclame Exploitatie Maatschapij decided to set up a television station. Even before its creation, the future station was receiving its first advertising money. The first test broadcasts were held on channel 11 on 15 August 1964 at 6:30pm. To receive the station a special antenna had to be bought. The coverage area encompassed much of the western side of the Netherlands, especially in the provinces of North and South Holland (with lower-grade reception in Hilversum), targeting 750,000 sets (some sources suggest 650,000 sets, for a total of two million viewers). A survey conducted on 24 August 1964 showed that 83% of respondents were against the government's potential decision to close the station down.

The first regular broadcasts started on 1 September at 6:30pm. The first advertisement seen was for Johnson's Pledge furniture polish. Also lined up for its first night were Macleans toothpaste, Brylcreem hairdressing cream and Dubonnet wine, as well as commercials for Dutch companies. A variety of imported programmes from the United States and the United Kingdom aired on the channel, among them The Invisible Man, Danger Man, The Adventures of Robin Hood, The Saint, Supercar, Mister Ed, The Bob Cummings Show, My Three Sons, Victory at Sea, Ben Casey and The Adventures of Rin-Tin-Tin. These series were acquired by American general manager Joe Brandel. Commercials were shot on 16mm film and were inserted in the copies of the foreign programmes from the distributors, before being sent to the island. There were also plans to start a studio in Amsterdam with videotaping facilities.

The effects of the 1958 Geneva Convention led to the nullification of the island's operational abilities. The Senate on 1 December passed on a law forbidding the island from operating its radio and television services, while, in a last-ditch effort to survive, a new company called TROS was created and on 12 December, the station was shut down to comply with the new legislation. With these events, viewers had cut the number of television channels available from three to two; those two being owned by the complex Dutch public broadcasting system. Commercials on television were legalised in 1967 when Ster made its first commercial break; while commercial television didn't kick off until 1989, with the failed launch of TV10 and the successful launch of RTL Veronique - which in 1990 absorbed some of TV10's would-be assets to the rebrand of the channel as RTL 4.
