= JuicyFields =

2022 Ponzi scheme

- Trade name: Juicy Holdings B.V
- Industry: Cannabis
- Founded: 2020
- Defunct: July 2022
- Fate: Collapse as a result of being a Ponzi scheme
- Headquarters: Berlin (Initially), Amsterdam
- Area served: Worldwide

JuicyFields, also known as Juicy Holdings B.V., was a Ponzi scheme centered around promoting investments in cannabis. It started in early 2020 and collapsed in July 2022. Around 186,000 people invested a total of around €645 million in JuicyFields. It was one of the largest cannabis scams.

== Model ==
JuicyFields claimed that investors could invest in cannabis plants and would receive profit from the sale of products made from the plants. It promised its investors a monthly 6–14% return on investment, with a minimum investment of €50. Investors were rewarded if they could get others involved, similar to a multi-level marketing scheme. Like in a Ponzi scheme, at least some of newer investments were used to pay off older investments. Defrauded money was put into cryptocurrencies and fiat money. Overall, around €645,000,000 from around 186,000 people was invested into JuicyFields.

The company was originally based in Berlin. It then moved to the Netherlands then Switzerland within a year.

Research by BNNVARA revealed JuicyFields paid South American plantations to install webcams and display JuicyFields banners to create the illusion for remote investors that they were viewing the plants they invested in.

=== Scheme mechanics and marketing ===
Investigations found that JuicyFields blended multi-level referral bonuses with staged “proof-of-plant” marketing. Dutch broadcaster BNNVARA reported that partner plantations in South America were asked to install webcams and hang JuicyFields banners so online investors would believe they were watching “their” plants in real time. French daily Le Monde described the pitch: “buy” a plant for €50 and receive 36–66% three months later—and traced how e-growers were onboarded through social media and trade-show promotion. German outlet CORRECTIV later documented internal chats and payment trails showing substantial use of crypto exchanges alongside conventional processors.

== History ==
The organization began activity in March 2020.

BaFin noted issues with JuicyFields in March 2022. In June, it banned the company from offering investments in cannabis. The organization collapsed in July 2022. It froze withdrawing investments, preventing users from accessing their money. They also deleted their social media accounts. Users also were not able to log into JuicyFields' website. The website had restarted by January 2023. Investments made prior to July 2022 were unable to be accessed.

== Response ==
The Dutch Public Prosecution Service told BNNVARA that no criminal investigation was opened because there was "insufficient national public interest" to justify such an investigation.

In late 2023, the CEO of JuicyFields', Stefan von Luxburg, car was lit on fire and vandalized with the message "From Russia with Love".

On April 11, 2024, Europol organized a raid across 11 nations, involving hundreds of officers. Nine people were arrested and 38 houses were searched. In August 2024, Sergei Berezin was extradited from the Dominican Republic to Spain.
