= Buddhist Broadcasting Foundation =

Religious broadcasting organization

The Buddhist Broadcasting Foundation is a religious broadcasting organization based in the Netherlands.

It produces and broadcasts a variety of programs on topics of Buddhism and Zen Buddhism.

== See also ==
- Boeddhistische Omroep Stichting
- Global Buddhist Network
- The Buddhist (TV channel)
- Shraddha TV
- Lord Buddha TV
- Access to Insight
