= Arnold Karskens =

Dutch journalist

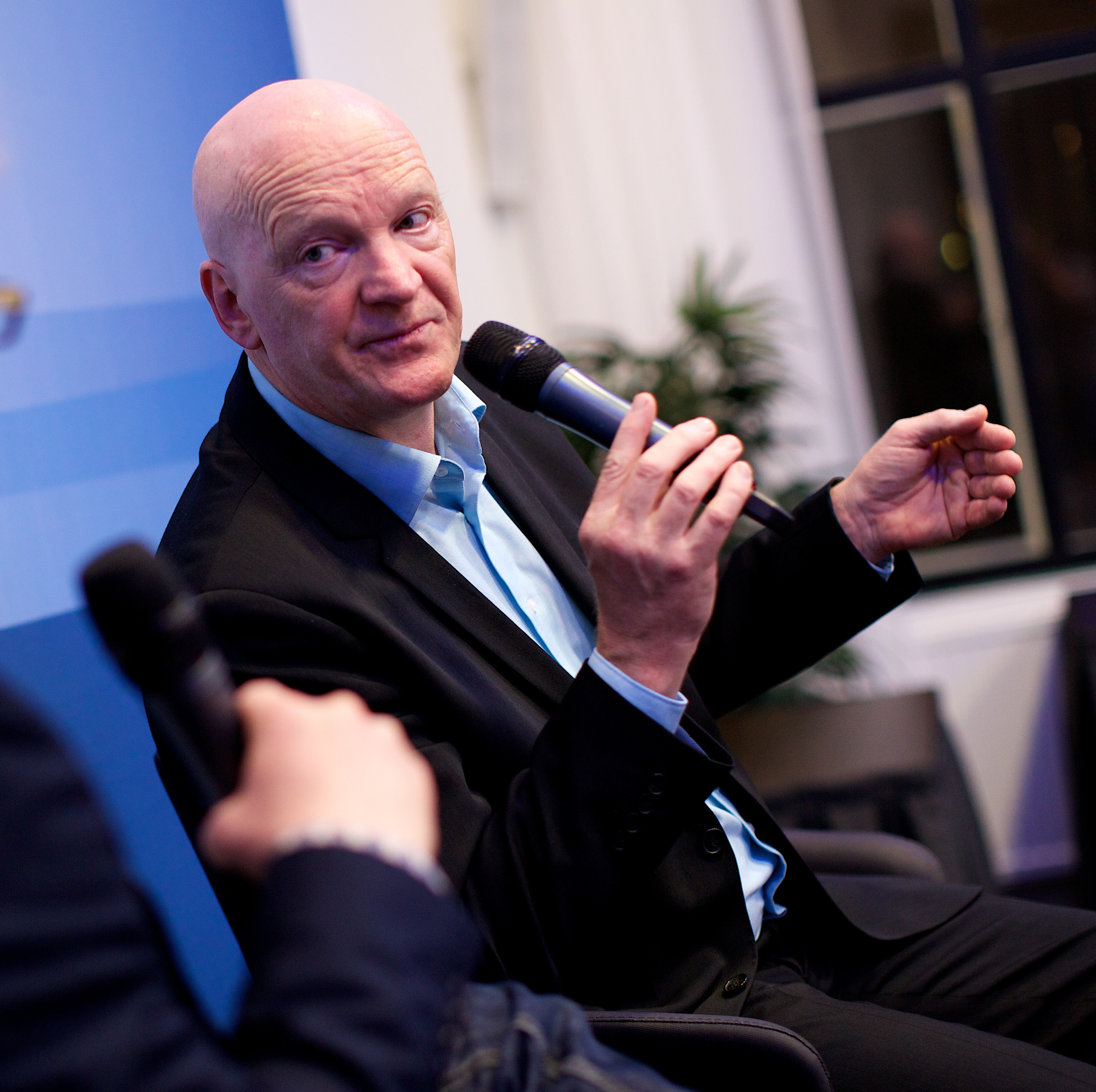
- Arnold Karskens in 2014
- Born: 19 August 1954 (age 72); Beemster, Netherlands
- Occupations: journalist, writer, war correspondent, media executive
- Employer: Ongehoord Nederland (2019-2024)
- Website: https://thekarskenstimes.com/

Arnold Karskens (born 19 August 1954) is a Dutch journalist, writer, and former war correspondent. He is a co-founder and former chairman of the Dutch broadcaster Ongehoord Nederland.

== Early life ==
Karskens studied journalism at the School for Journalism in Utrecht.

== Career ==
Karskens worked as a freelance journalist for fifteen years and was employed part-time by Nieuwe Revu from 1995 to 2008. Between April 2008 and March 2012, Karskens worked for the free daily newspaper De Pers, and between 2013 and 2015 as a reporter and columnist for ThePostOnline (Magazine). Since 2016, he has maintained the website TheKarskensTimes, and in 2022 he became chairman of the public broadcaster Ongehoord Nederland. In August 2024, he was suspended from that position and dismissed in October of that year.

=== War correspondent ===
He began his career in 1980 with a visit to guerrilla soldiers of the People's Revolutionary Army in El Salvador. Since then, he has visited some thirty different conflict zones. In 2008, he worked in the war zones of Iraq and Afghanistan, mainly focused on the Uruzgan region. He insisted on working as an independent journalist and not as an embedded journalist. He has contributed to TV and radio programs, and several current affairs programs. He was a regular guest on talk shows.

=== Hunt for war criminals ===
Karskens gathered a great deal of information about Frans van Anraat and Guus Kouwenhoven, who were convicted of war crimes. He was also chairman of the Foundation for the Investigation of War Crimes, which sought to bring the fugitive Dutch Nazi and war criminal Klaas Carel Faber to justice. He helped arrange for co-plaintiff Theun de Groot to participate in the trial of Dutch SS member and Aktion Silbertanne participant Heinrich Boere in 2009 and 2010. In 2012, Karskens wrote the book De Beestmensch about the hunt for Faber. Since 2015, he has maintained a list of ten Dutch war criminals from the Second World War who may not yet have served their sentences.

=== Participatory journalism ===
On the night of 7 November 2010, Karskens was arrested at Brussels North Station on suspicion of disturbing public order. At the time, he was working on a report about people without residence permits when the police attempted to close off the train station. According to a statement in the newspaper De Standaard, his arrest was a pretext for the police to delete a photo Karskens had taken of heavy-handed action by the Brussels police.

In September 2015, he was on a boat with Iranian asylum seekers in the Ionian Sea between Turkey and Greece, where he was arrested for illegally crossing the border. His foundation has reported former European Commissioner Frans Timmermans to the police for perceived manslaughter in the drowning of migrants in the Mediterranean Sea.

Karskens is an opponent of large-scale Dutch military missions in countries such as Iraq, Mali, and Afghanistan. He believes that foreign military intervention does not contribute to lasting peace. He expressed strong criticism of the Dutch integrated police training mission in Kunduz, Afghanistan, during a hearing in the House of Representatives on 24 January 2011.

=== Plagiarism ===
On 16 April 2012, Karskens made an accusation of plagiarism at the presentation of the Tegel for Investigative Journalism award regarding Natalie Righton, a reporter for the newspaper De Volkskrant in Kabul. Karskens alleged that she had stolen the content of an article written by him about the costs of training an Afghan police officer by Dutch trainers.

=== Journalistic corruption ===
In 2016, he published Journalist te koop - hoe corrupt zijn onze media?, a collection of interviews with colleagues about journalistic ethics.

Between October 2017 and October 2019, Karskens maintained the "NOS Journaal Black Book", in which he collected incidents of alleged misinformation and discrimination broadcast by the Dutch public broadcaster NOS. In 2019, he filed a complaint regarding these allegations. The Dutch Public Prosecution Service subsequently reviewed the black book and concluded that no criminal offenses had been committed.

=== Ongehoord Nederland ===
In 2019, Karskens, together with former VVD MP Ybeltje Berckmoes-Duindam, actor and writer Haye van der Heyden, and journalist Joost Niemöller, founded the broadcasting association Ongehoord Nederland (ON!), which aimed to provide a "necessary" dissenting voice within the Dutch Public Broadcasting Foundation (NPO). The new organization recruited the 50,000 members needed to be provisionally recognized within the Dutch public broadcasting system in less than a month. From 2022, the broadcaster was granted airtime on public television. Karskens became the first chairman of Ongehoord Nederland.

On 2 August 2024, he was suspended by the supervisory board following complaints about his performance. Karskens subsequently stated that he was the victim of false anonymous allegations, and that a coup against him was being staged. On 11 October 2024, Ongehoord Nederland's supervisory board decided to dismiss Karskens as chairman and board member. According to the ON! supervisory board, the dismissal was based on a report released on 7 October of that year by the consultancy firm Svision, which was drawn up in response to complaints received about Karskens. In a press statement, Karskens responded to his dismissal by labeling it "an insult to me and all founding members." On 21 April 2026, a court of appeal in The Hague called his dismissal 'unfounded' and ruled that the internal and external investigations had been conducted "with extraordinary care". ON! was ordered to pay him 100,000 euros in damages.

== Awards ==
- Clara Meijer-Wichmann Medal (2008)
