= TWR-UK =

British Christian radio station

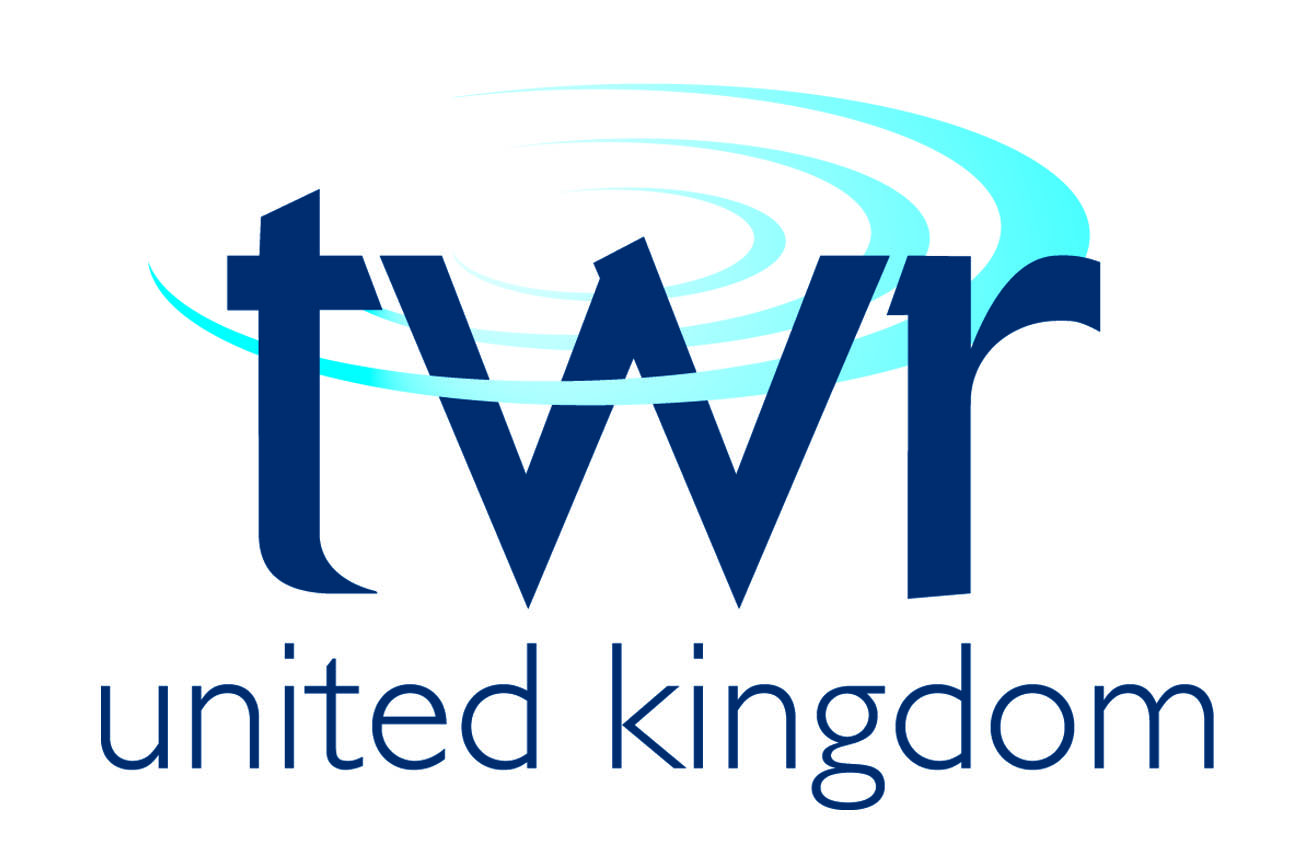

United Kingdom
- Frequency: Freeview: 277 Freely: 566 (Radioplayer App for Smart TVs)

Programming
- Format: Christian Radio

Ownership
- Owner: Trans World Radio Limited

Links
- Webcast: Webcast TWR-UK
- Website: Official website

TWR-UK is a British Christian radio station and part of Trans World Radio (TWR) a multinational evangelical Christian media distributor. The station went online-only on 31 March 2025.

TWR-UK broadcasts Christian programming, including sermons, Bible teaching and interviews across the United Kingdom.

== History ==
TWR-UK was founded in 1963, at that time TWR-UK only broadcast programmes for a couple of hours each day. These were broadcast initially on shortwave from the much-loved Monte Carlo transmitter, a transmitter formerly used to broadcast German war propaganda in the Second World War but later acquired by Trans World Radio in 1958. With the arrival of satellite technology in the 1990s, the possibility of 24/7 broadcasting schedules emerged. From 2001 TWR-UK began broadcasting a 24/7 schedule, the same year they joined the Sky satellite service.

In 2005 TWR-UK relocated their headquarters to Altrincham in Greater Manchester where they currently broadcast from today.

In 2013 to mark the 50th anniversary of TWR-UK, the broadcasters launched their first digital app, making it possible for listeners to catch up on old programmes and listen live through their own personal devices.

In April 2015 TWR-UK began broadcasting on Freeview making their programmes available to most households across the UK.

== Overseas projects ==
As well as being a national UK radio station, TWR-UK also support a variety of overseas projects. Notably in 2022 TWR-UK when listeners raised over £25,000 to support people living in Ukraine during the Russo-Ukrainian War.

The wider Trans World Radio group broadcasts globally in over 300 languages in 190 countries, making it the world's most far-reaching Christian radio network.

== Listenership ==
TWR-UK supporters come from a variety of Christian denominations including: Anglican, Baptist, Evangelical, Methodist and Pentecostal churches.
