= Ineke Dezentjé Hamming-Bluemink =

Dutch politician (born 1954)

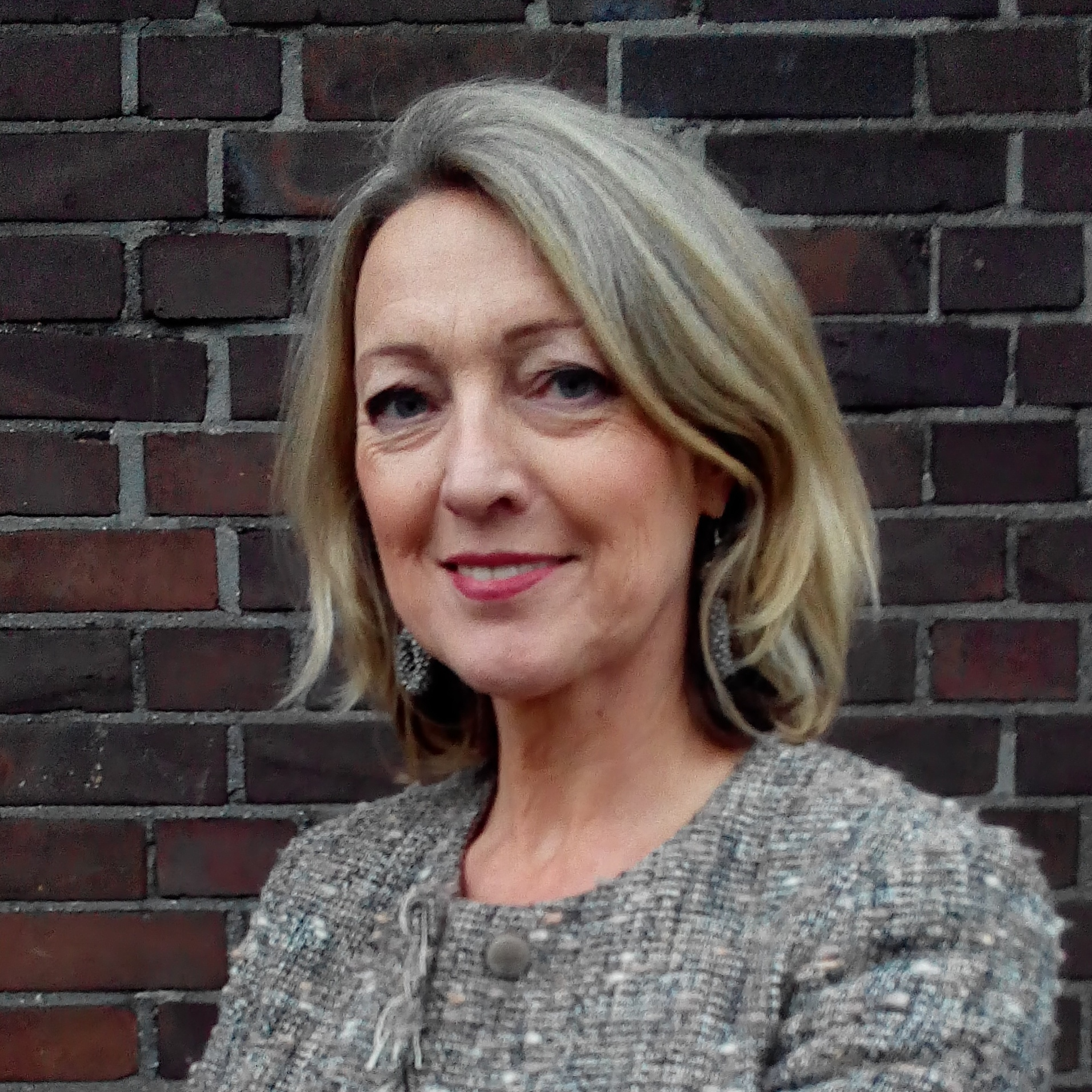

Member of the House of Representatives
- In office 3 June 2003 – 9 November 2011

Personal details
- Born: 15 September 1954 (age 72) Amsterdam, Netherlands
- Party: People's Party for Freedom and Democracy
- Education: Erasmus University Rotterdam (LLM)
- Occupation: Politician, corporate director

Ineke Dezentjé Hamming-Bluemink (born 15 September 1954) is a former Dutch politician. As a member of the People's Party for Freedom and Democracy (VVD) she was elected to the House of Representatives from 3 June 2003 to 9 November 2011. She focused on matters linked to the Algemene Ouderdomswet and other pensions affairs. She was succeeded by Ybeltje Berckmoes-Duindam when she resigned to become corporate director of employers' organization FME-CWM. At FME-CWM, she succeeded her party colleague Jan Kamminga as the chairperson. She was appointed on November 14, 2011 and stepped down as president in 2021. From April 1, 2014, to March 31, 2016, Dezentjé Hamming-Bluemink served as an employer member of the Social and Economic Council representing VNO-NCW.

Previously, she was a member from 2002 to 2004 of the municipal council of Cromstrijen and studied law at Erasmus University Rotterdam.
