= Raisa Blommestijn =

Dutch legal scholar and television presenter

- Born: 23 March 1994 (age 32); Voorburg, Netherlands
- Education: Leiden University (Ph.D.)
- Occupations: legal philosopher, former lawyer, commentator, television presenter
- Employer: Ongehoord Nederland (2022–2024, 2024–present)

Raisa Blommestijn (born 23 March 1994) is a Dutch legal scholar and television presenter. She has worked as a commentator for Ongehoord Nederland since 2022.

== Biography ==
Raisa Blommestijn was born in Voorburg. Blommestijn obtained her secondary school diploma at the Veurs Lyceum in Leidschendam in 2012. She then studied law at Leiden University from 2012 to 2018, earning her bachelor's degree in 2015, a master's degree in Encyclopedie en Filosofie van het recht in 2016, and graduating cum laude with an MA in Philosophy of Law in 2018. From 2015 onwards, she was affiliated with Leiden University's Institute for Metajuridics, working in the Department of the Encyclopedia of Legal Science, first as a student assistant and junior lecturer, and from January 2018 to December 2021 as a lecturer and researcher. On 12 April 2022, she obtained her PhD under Afshin Ellian with a dissertation on the downfall of the Weimar Republic, titled Het spook van Weimar: Een democratie in crisis. A book version of the dissertation was subsequently published by Uitgeverij Prometheus. The book was reviewed extensively, with one journalist describing her writing as difficult for laypeople to follow, and it was also subjected to critical academic commentary. After her PhD, she left the university and together with Eva Vlaardingerbroek, was briefly employed as a lawyer at the law firm Maes Law, but left after a few months.

She subsequently became a commentator for the public broadcaster Ongehoord Nederland (ON) and since January 2023 has worked as a presenter for its TV program Ongehoord Nieuws. Some of the statements she made as a commentator caused public controversy, including with her former employers at Leiden University. In January 2024, she left ON following a conflict with its head editor Arnold Karskens regarding her public statements on social media. Blommestijn called it an "attempt at censorship" on the part of ON, which it denied. After Karskens was suspended from ON on August 2, 2024, Blommestijn rejoined the public broadcaster.

In May 2024, the Dutch Public Prosecution Service announced it would prosecute Blommestijn for hate speech due to allegedly racist statements she had made on Twitter in 2023, having written about "negroid primates" assaulting white people in response to an assault. In November, the Public Prosecution Service requested a sentence of 40 hours community service. On 5 December of that year, she was sentenced to eighty hours of community service for hate speech and defamation, forty hours of which were suspended with a probationary period of two years. She was also ordered to pay damages of €1,550 to the lawyer and former D66 MP Sidney Smeets, who had previously come under scrutiny following allegations of sexual misconduct involving minors but had not been prosecuted, after she had labeled him a "kindergartener fucker" in a tweet. In May 2026, she was sentenced on appeal to thirty hours of community service, ten hours of which were suspended.
