= TROS =

Former Dutch television and radio organisation

- Type: Public broadcasting association
- Country: Netherlands
- First air date: 2 October 1966
- Founded: 4 November 1964; 61 years ago
- Headquarters: Hilversum, Netherlands
- Dissolved: 7 September 2014
- Official website: tros.nl
- Replaced by: AVROTROS

Omroepvereniging TROS (lit. 'TROS Broadcasting Association'), originally an acronym for Televisie Radio Omroep Stichting ('Television Radio Broadcasting Foundation'), was a public broadcaster within the Dutch public broadcasting system. It was known for its entertainment programmes and focus on Dutch-language pop music. In 2014, TROS merged with fellow broadcaster AVRO to form AVROTROS.

== History ==
TROS was founded on 4 November 1964 as a direct response to the introduction of the Anti-REM Act. From the REM Island, the pirate broadcaster TV Noordzee had briefly transmitted television programmes from outside Dutch territorial waters. At first, the government was unable to intervene, but the new law brought an abrupt end to these broadcasts. Many viewers, however, missed the light entertainment programmes that TV Noordzee had offered.

The entrepreneurs behind TV Noordzee subsequently sought to continue their activities within the official public broadcasting system by establishing a formally recognised broadcaster. The organisation's provisional name was Televisie Radio Omroep Stichting, but in accordance with the regulations of the Dutch public broadcasting system, it ultimately adopted the legal form of an association (vereniging) rather than a foundation (stichting). As a result, the acronym TROS became its official name.

TROS grew rapidly. Within a decade it advanced from aspiring broadcaster (1966) to C-status (1967), then to B-status (1 October 1971), and finally achieved A-status on 1 October 1974. Unlike the older broadcasters – all rooted in religious or ideological pillars dating back to the 1920s – TROS positioned itself as a non-ideological, viewer-driven organisation. Its mission was to broadcast the programmes people actually wanted to watch. The success of this approach reshaped Dutch public broadcasting. Competing stations, fearing loss of audience share, increasingly adopted similar entertainment-focused programming. This shift became known as vertrossing (lit. 'TROS-ification').

In 2004, TROS celebrated its 40th anniversary. The broadcaster published two television guides: TROS Kompas and TV-krant.

== Programmes ==
=== Television ===
==== Game shows ====
- Eén tegen 100
- Lingo (from 2000)
- Miljoenenjacht
- Te land, ter zee en in de lucht

==== News and consumer programmes ====
- EenVandaag, a daily news bulletin (with AVRO)
- TROS Radar, a consumer rights programme
- TROS TV Show, a weekly chat show

==== Entertainment ====
- Bassie & Adriaan, a children's series
- Eurovision Song Contest (from 2010)
- Dit was het nieuws, the Dutch version of Have I Got News for You
- Spoed, a hospital soap opera

=== Radio ===
- Mega Top 50
- TROS Europarade
- TROS Nieuwsshow

== Logos ==
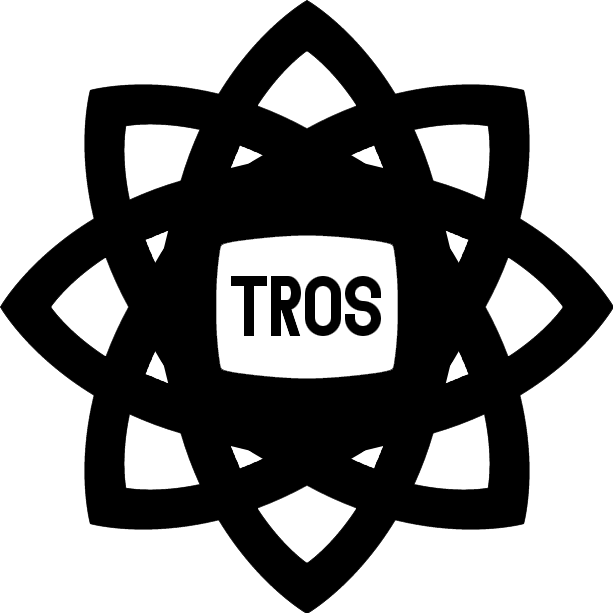
1964–1984

1984–1994

1994–2014
