= Socutera =

Dutch public broadcasting system

- Type: Public broadcaster
- Country: Netherlands
- Availability: Netherlands
- Owner: Netherlands Public Broadcasting
- Official website: socutera.nl

Socutera (the acronym stands for: Stichting ter bevordering van Sociale en Culturele doeleinden door Televisie en Radio; English: Foundation for the promotion of Social and Cultural purposes on Television and Radio) is a special broadcaster on the Netherlands Public Broadcasting system, which is allowed to broadcast on radio and television because of their spiritual background. Article 2.42 of the Dutch media law (the Mediawet) accommodates faith-based radio and television broadcasters which unlike regular public broadcasters (several of which are also faith-based) do not have to have a minimum number of members.

They do not make programmes but weekly broadcast for 2.5 minutes on all the three public television stations in 95 and 20 second TV ads for various charities and causes.
