= Dutch Radio Union =

Dutch broadcasting union

The Nederlandse Radio Unie (Netherlands Radio Union; NRU) or Dutch Radio Union was a partnership of Dutch broadcasting associations founded in 1947 that provided facilities and executive support for the radio broadcasts of the broadcasters. In 1969, the NRU and the Nederlandse Televisie Stichting (NTS) merged into the newly established Nederlandse Omroep Stichting (NOS).

== History ==
After failed attempts to establish a new public broadcasting system with one national broadcaster, the Stichting Radio Nederland in den Overgangstijd (Radio Netherlands in Time of Transition), which had been established in 1945 to take over the broadcasts of Radio Herrijzend Nederland (Radio Resurgent Netherlands) in the transition to a new broadcasting system, was dissolved. It was replaced by a federation of broadcasting associations, the Nederlandse Radio Unie.

The NRU acted as a facility company for the Dutch broadcasting associations. The associations themselves provided the radio broadcasts, but things like choirs, orchestras, reporting vans and technical services, which had been the responsibility of the separate associations before the Second World War, came under the management of the NRU. The permanent radio drama core was also part of the NRU.
