= Trans World Radio =

Christian radio station

TWR (Trans World Radio)
- Speaking Hope to the World
- Founded: 1952; 74 years ago
- Founder: Paul Freed
- Type: Evangelical media distributor
- Headquarters: Cary, North Carolina, U.S.
- Region served: 190 countries, 200+ languages and dialects
- President & CEO: Andy Schick
- Key people: Andy Schick, president
- Website: twr.org

TWR (also known as Trans World Radio) is a multinational, evangelical Christian media distributor. The largest Christian media organization in the world, it uses high-powered medium-wave (AM) and shortwave transmitters, local FM radio stations, cable, satellite, the internet, mobile devices and other digital technologies.

TWR distributes the programs of Christian broadcasters such as Thru the Bible and Turning Point as well as TWR-produced programs, including Mission 66, Women of Hope, Dr. Luke, The Way of Righteousness, Men of Courage and Precious and Beloved. TWR programs can be heard in 190 countries in more than 200 languages and dialects.

TWR is a member of Evangelical Council for Financial Accountability (ECFA), Evangelical Press Association (EPA), National Religious Broadcasters (NRB), and International Orality Network (ION).

== History ==
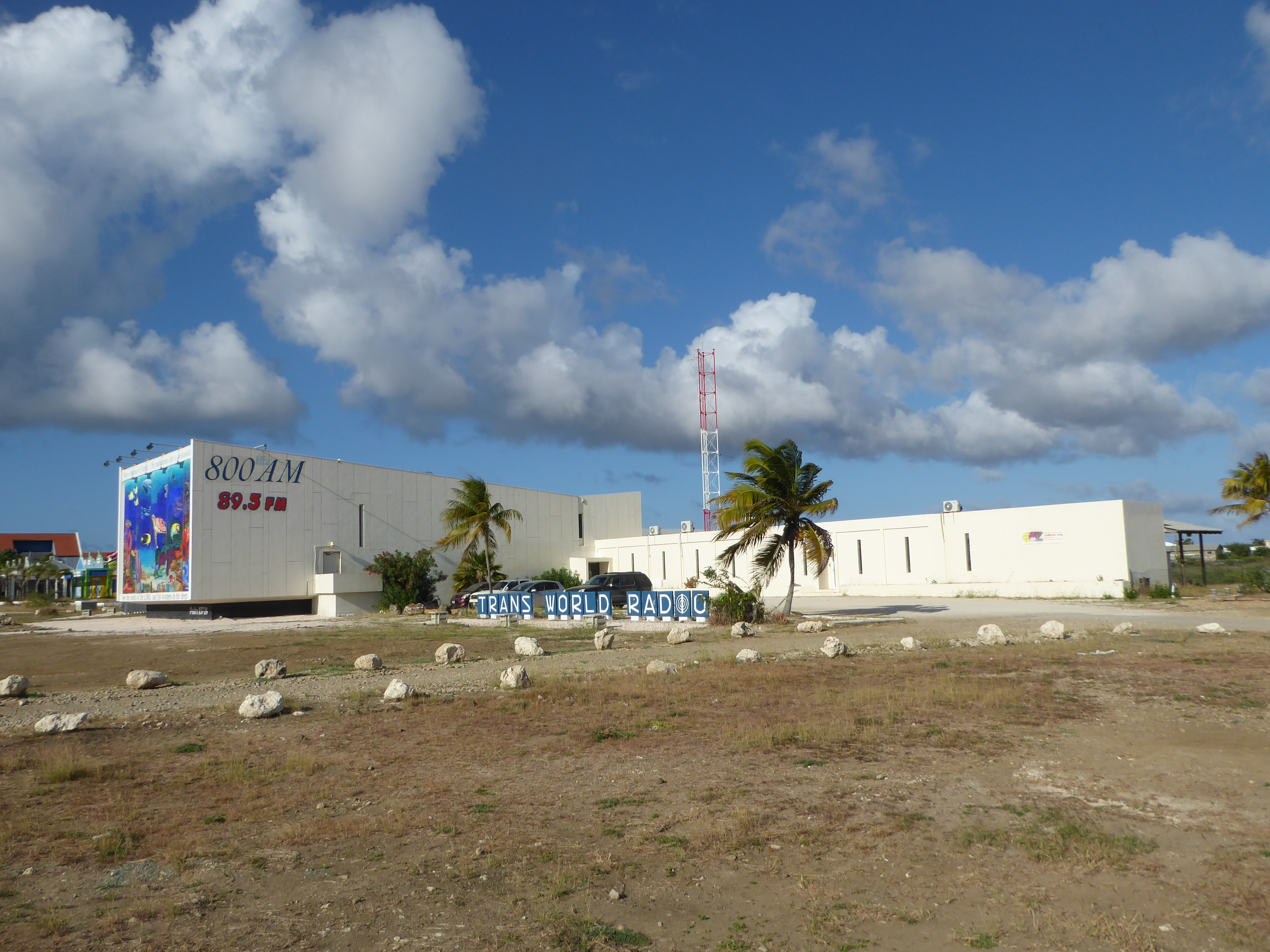
Broadcasting facility

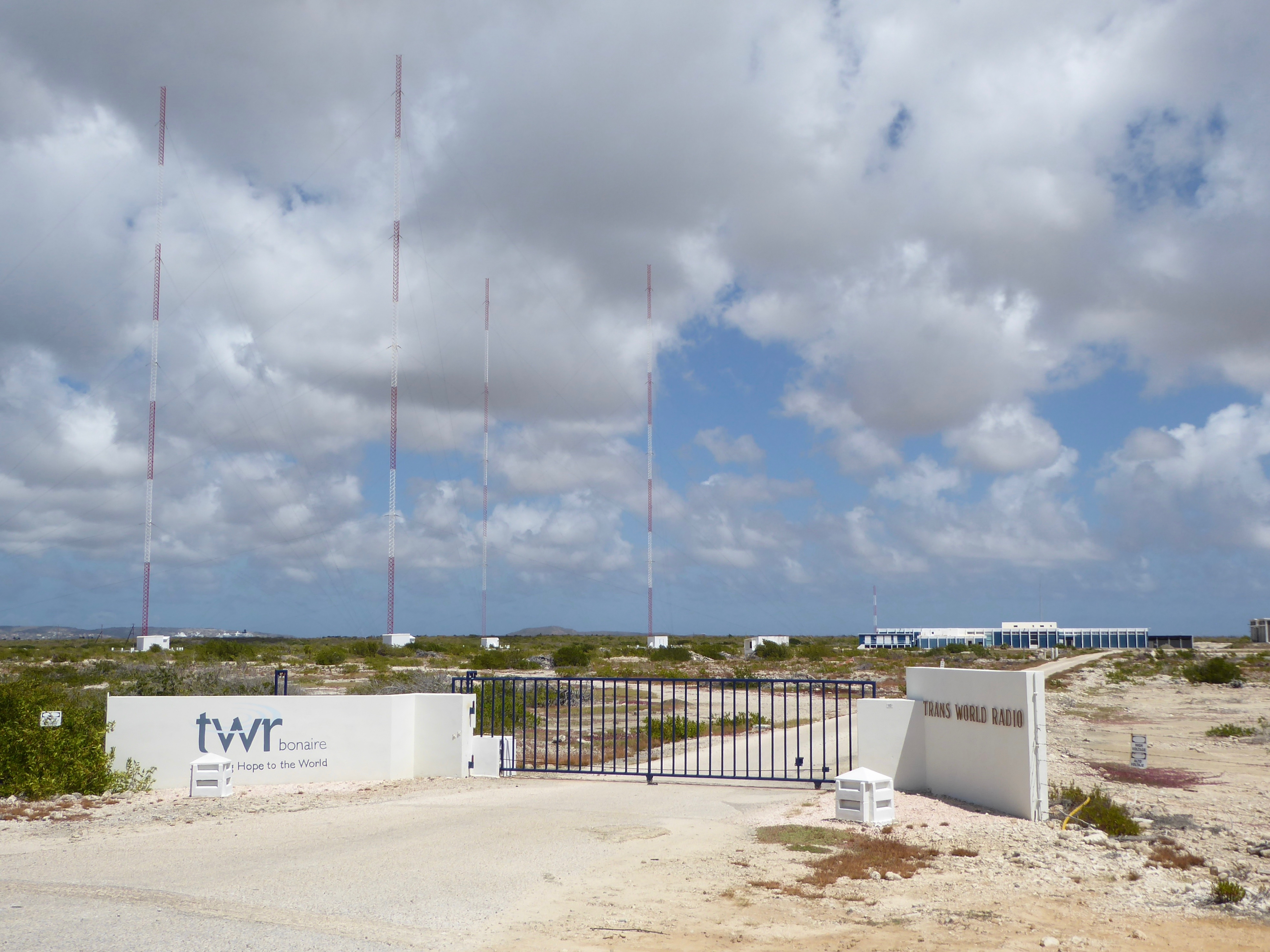
Transmission antennas

Bonaire operations of TWR on FM 89.5 MHz and AM 800 kHz.

TWR started in 1952, when Paul Freed set up the organization to reach Spain by broadcasting from Morocco: on February 22, 1954, The Voice of Tangier in Morocco broadcast the first TWR transmission to Europe.

The history of this radio mission began with a 2,500-watt shortwave transmitter dating back to World War II. The programs, initially intended for the Iberian Peninsula in Spanish and English, quickly expanded. On January 1, 1956, a new 10,000-watt transmitter was added, allowing large parts of Europe to be reached. By the time The Voice of Tangier ceased broadcasting in 1959, the radio mission was broadcasting in 24 languages.

Until 1959, Tangier was an international zone, but then it was placed under the control of the Moroccan government. The government decreed that all nongovernmental radio stations had to cease operations by December 31, 1959. Thus, the story of TWR from Tangier ended after less than five years.

Before leaving Morocco, Freed signed a contract to build and operate a shortwave transmitter at Radio Monte Carlo in the Principality of Monaco in September 1959. Since May 1960, TWR was broadcasting from the transmitter facilities previously built by the Nazis on Mount Agel in Monte Carlo. A medium-wave transmitter was added four years later.

Other major transmitting sites have included Guam (KTWG), Bonaire, Sri Lanka, Cyprus, and Eswatini (formerly Swaziland). The Federal Communications Commission has assigned the call letters KTWR to the Guam transmitter site. The callsign PJB is assigned to the Bonaire station. TWR announced plans to shut down KTWR on Guam by October 2025 due to logistics and cost issues related to Guam's remote location and the station's aging equipment. All programs intended for countries across Asia would continue, however, broadcasts being relocated to other partner stations.

From 1995, TWR broadcast from state-owned transmitters in Meyerton near Johannesburg, South Africa, as well as from two formerly Soviet states in Central Asia.

== Network ==
TWR is member of the Association of Christian Broadcasters.

== See also ==
- List of international religious radio broadcasters
- List of religious radio stations
