= Ybeltje Berckmoes-Duindam =

Dutch politician (born 1967)

Member of the House of Representatives
- In office 9 November 2011 – 23 March 2017

Personal details
- Born: Ybeltje Duindam; 11 February 1967 (age 59) Leiden, Netherlands
- Party: People's Party for Freedom and Democracy
- Education: University of Amsterdam (BA)
- Occupation: Politician; Pharmacist

Ybeltje Berckmoes-Duindam (born 11 February 1967) is a retired Dutch politician who served as a member of the House of Representatives from 9 November 2011 to 23 March 2017. A member of the People's Party for Freedom and Democracy (Volkspartij voor Vrijheid en Democratie – VVD), she replaced demissionary Ineke Dezentjé Hamming-Bluemink and was elected to a full parliamentary term during the 2012 Dutch general election. She did not seek reelection in the 2017 election.

Born in Leiden, she previously served as a member of the municipal council of Den Helder from 2006 to 2011 with a brief interruption in 2010. She resides in Julianadorp, town part of the municipality of Den Helder.
