= Refresh FM =

Manchester, UK; England
- Frequency: FM: 87.7 MHz

Programming
- Language: English
- Format: Christian

Ownership
- Owner: Independent

Refresh FM is a Christian radio station which broadcasts in South and Central Manchester under a Restricted Service Licence. The station is run by a steering group of volunteers although the original broadcasts were based at Victoria Park Christian Fellowship an evangelical church in Manchester.

The radio station has broadcast almost every year at Easter time from 2003; the latest broadcast was in April 2013.

It is entirely staffed by volunteers from churches across Manchester and broadcasts a range of programmes including music, interviews, discussions, real-life stories and Bible devotions.

== 2013 ==
The station moved out of Victoria Park Fellowship's building due to refurbishment in 2013. A new studio was constructed and the station adopted free radio software. During the 28-day broadcast Refresh FM decided to continue online and now broadcasts repeats of programmes and a mix of music.

== Controversy ==
An article about Refresh FM was published on the gay news site Pink News in September 2009 after it allegedly sacked one of its voluntary DJs because he was gay. There was a debate about whether this situation was covered by the UK's anti-discrimination laws because it covered a man who was unpaid and did not have a contract of employment.
