= Boeddhistische Omroep Stichting =

- Type: Public broadcaster
- Country: Netherlands
- Availability: Netherlands
- Founded: 30 June 1999
- Dissolved: 1 January 2016
- Official website: boeddhistischeomroep.nl

Boeddhistische Omroep Stichting (abbr. BOS: English: Buddhist Broadcasting Foundation) was a special broadcaster on the Netherlands Public Broadcasting system, which was allowed to broadcast on radio and television because of their religious background. It was one of the "2.42 broadcasters" (named after the Article 2.42 of the Mediawet, the Dutch media law, which allowed faith-based broadcasters to get airtime on radio and TV without having to have any members). The broadcaster was known for broadcasting from a Buddhist perspective.

On 1 January 2016, the 2.42 broadcasters were extinct, including BOS, due to budget cuts at the public broadcasting system. After that, Christian broadcaster KRO-NCRV, in cooperation with the Boeddhistische Unie Nederland (BUN), became responsible for producing programming for the Buddhist community, such as De Boeddhistische Blik.
