= Foundation Hindu Media =

Defunct Dutch broadcaster for the Hindu community

Foundation Hindu Media / Organisatie Hindoe Media
- Type: Public broadcaster
- Country: Netherlands
- Availability: Netherlands
- Founded: February 10, 1993
- Owner: Netherlands Public Broadcasting
- Dissolved: 2016
- Official website: ohmnet.nl

The Foundation Hindu Media, Dutch: Organisatie Hindoe Media (abbr. OHM), was a special broadcaster on the Netherlands Public Broadcasting system, which was allowed to broadcast on radio and television because of their religious background. They made programming for the Dutch Hindu community.

OHM was one of the "2.42 broadcasters" (named after the Article 2.42 of the Mediawet, the Dutch media law, which allowed faith-based broadcasters to get airtime on radio and TV without having to have any members).

Its first television broadcast was on October 3, 1993 on Nederland 1, while the first radio broadcast was on Radio 5 the following day.

On January 1, 2016, the broadcasters in the NPO were reduced to eight, and the 2.42-broadcasters, including OHM, ceased to exist. NTR became responsible for producing programming for Hindu people.
