= REM Island =

Television station

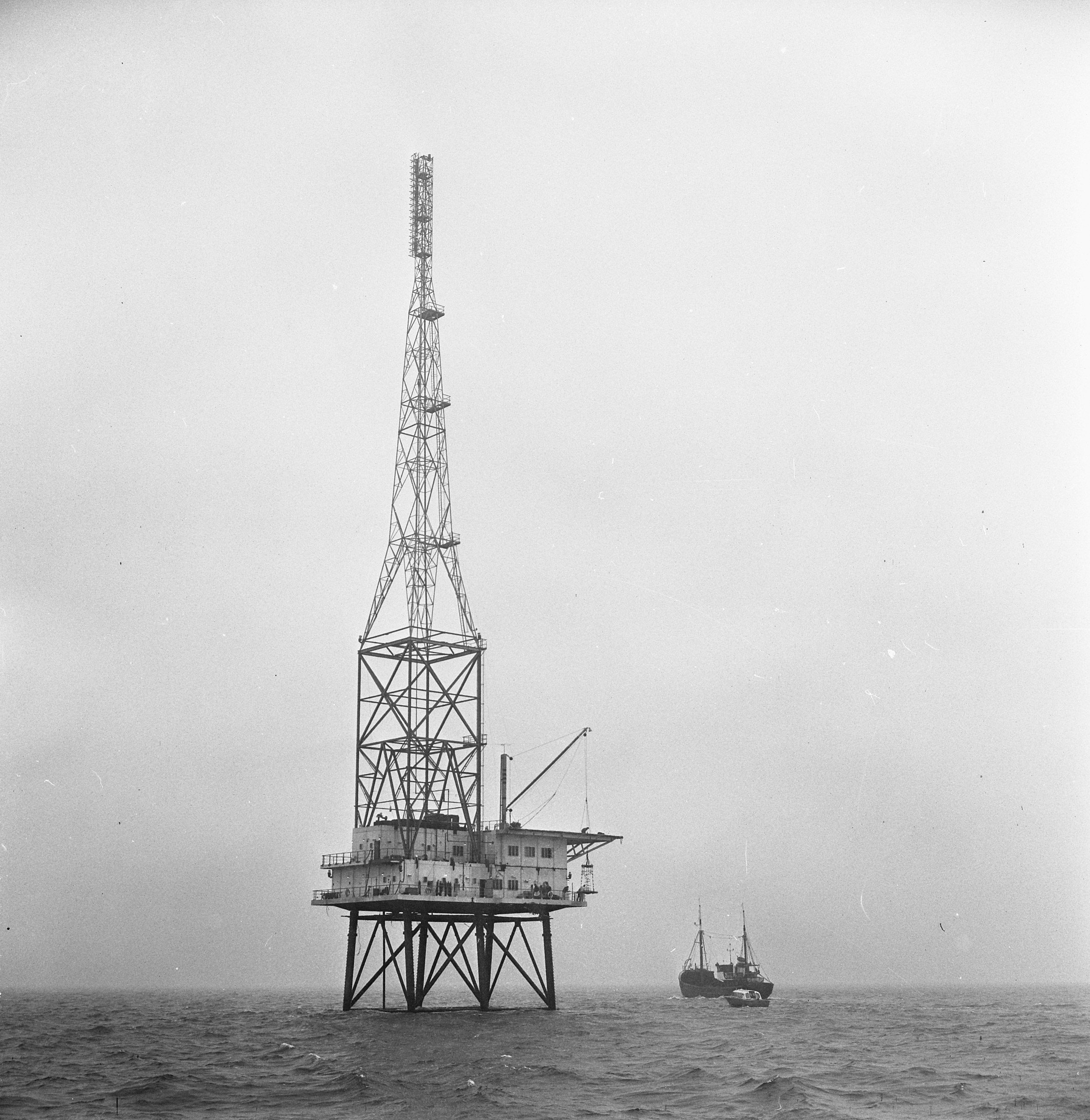
Photograph of REM Island, taken 16 December 1964

The Reclame Exploitatie Maatschappij (REM) is the first pirate broadcasting station of Europe to operate on an artificial island created for commercial purposes instead of a mobile vessel, marine platform, or maritime structures from the military. REM cast radio and TV programmes from a fixed installation 10 kilometers off Noordwijk from August 1964 to December 1964. The fixed installational structure of REM was an unprecedented case that forced Dutch authorities to pass a new law that was created with the sole purpose to stop this operation, the anti-REM-law.

The REM-island was relocated to Nieuwe Houthaven, Amsterdam in 2011 and has been transformed into a restaurant.

== Construction ==
Radio and TV Noordzee were founded in 1963 with land-based offices and broadcast from the sea. The artificial island was built in the harbour of Cork, Ireland. It was towed to its location and anchored in cement on the seabed.

Especially Denmark, Norway, Sweden, Finland, Belgium, the UK, and the Netherlands were subject to pirate broadcasting in the 1960s. Major pirate broadcasting stations included Radio Mercur (beaming to Denmark) that first aired on 1958, Radio Syd (beaming to Sweden and Finland) that first aired on 1958, Radio Nord (beaming to Denmark and Sweden) that first aired on 1961, Radio Veronica (beaming to the Netherlands) that first aired on 1960, Radio Caroline (beaming to the UK) that first aired on March 1964. Followed closely by REM that first aired on 12 August 1964, when a test broadcast was performed. Regular broadcasting started on 15 August. The radio service broadcast on 1400 kHz, while on television, it used Channel E11 (System B).

REM stands for Reclame Exploitatie Maatschappij (Dutch for "Advertising Operation Company") and broadcast commercial radio and TV programmes. Unique to REM is the structure of an artificial island. Up until REM, all prior European major pirate broadcasting stations were operated on ships and vessels rather than a fixed installation. Dutch law at the time did not authorise such broadcasts, but the island was outside territorial waters.

== Raid ==
While Dutch authorities were unhappy with the broadcasts, they did not possess the legal right to stop them. However, on 12 December 1964, the government passed the anti-REM-law, which split the North Sea into continental sections. The sea bed under REM Island, to which the structure was attached, was therefore declared Dutch territory. Five days later, Korps Mariniers boarded the platform and ended broadcasting.

== Dismantling ==
A year after the raid, Radio Noordzee resumed transmissions legally under the name TROS. After that REM Island was used by the government to measure sea temperature and salt concentration. After a failed attempt to sell the island in 2004, the government dismantled it with a goodbye radio event by amateur radio enthusiasts, with the callsign PB6REM on the platform on 8 June 2006.

Since March 2011, the platform sits in Amsterdam harbour, at 52.3986°N 4.8832°E, where it serves as a restaurant.

== Gallery ==
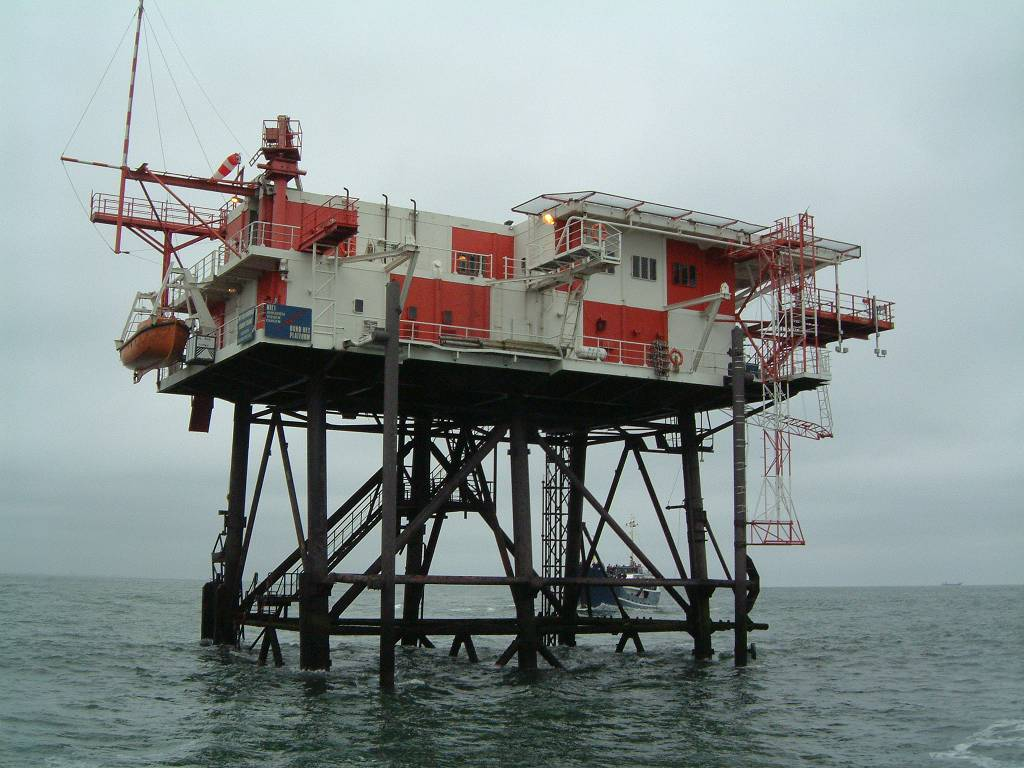
REM Island

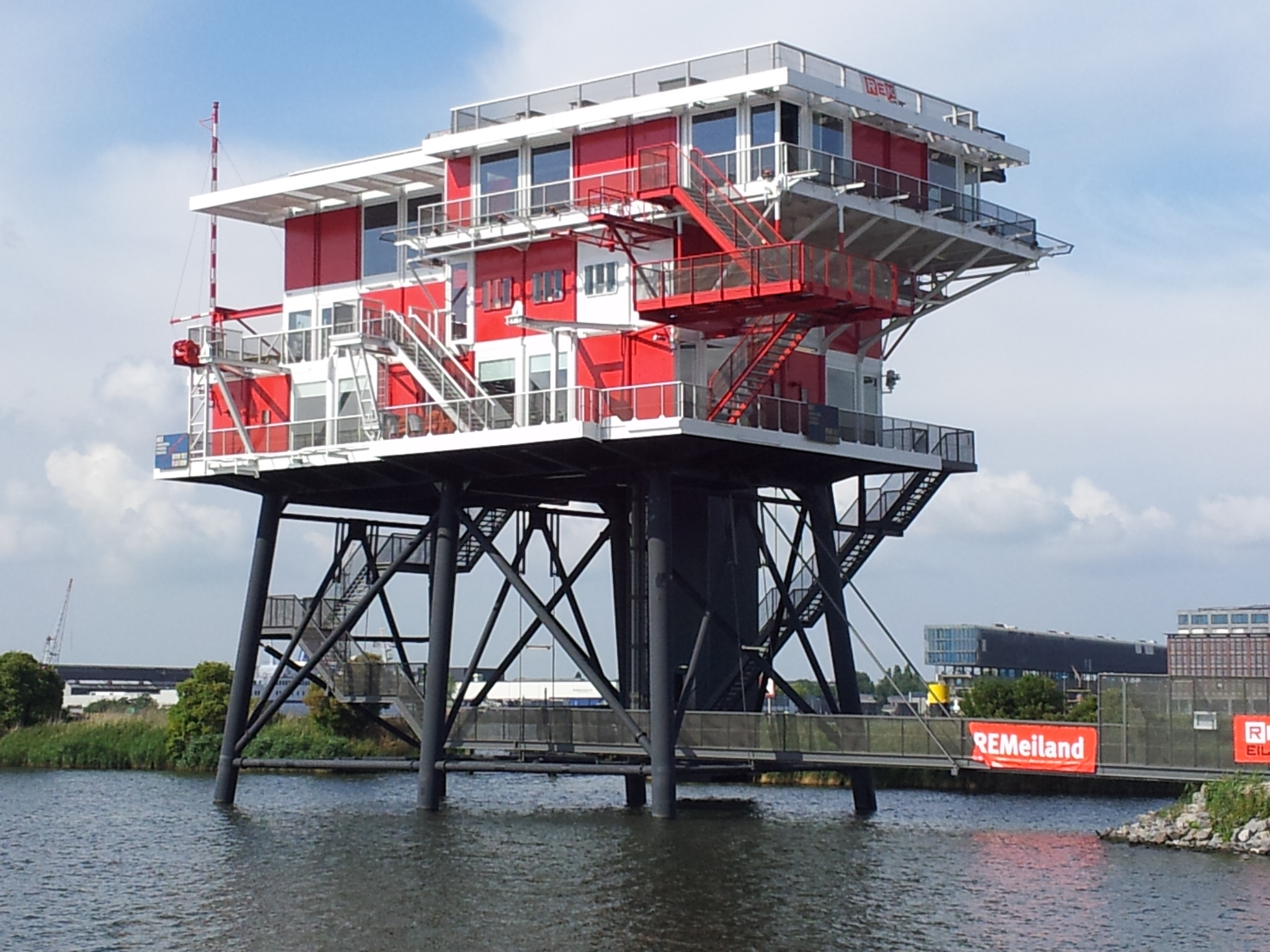
REM Island as an Amsterdam restaurant

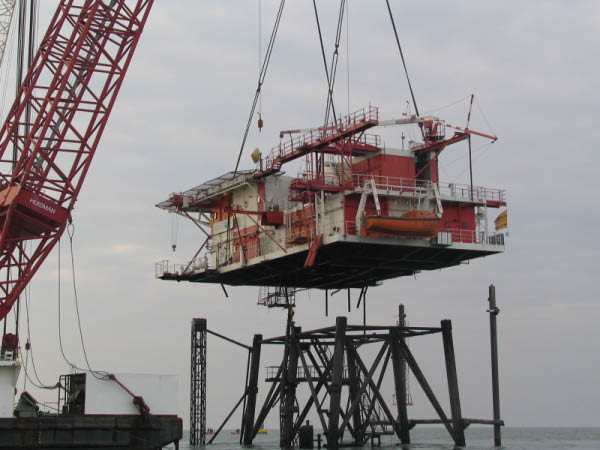
Dismantling of the REM Island
