= Zendtijd voor Kerken =

- Type: Public broadcaster
- Country: Netherlands
- Availability: Netherlands
- Founded: October 1994
- Dissolved: 1 January 2016
- Official website: zvk.nl

Zendtijd voor Kerken (abbr. ZvK: English: Airtime for Churches) was a special broadcaster on the Netherlands Public Broadcasting system, which was allowed to broadcast on radio and television because of their religious background. It was one of the "2.42 broadcasters" (named after the Article 2.42 of the Mediawet, the Dutch media law, which allowed faith-based broadcasters to get airtime on radio and TV without having to have any members).

On 1 January 2016, ZvK closed down and its programming is now produced by EO.

They made programming for various church communities namely:

- The Christelijke Gereformeerde Kerken
- The Gereformeerde kerken in Nederland (vrijgemaakt)
- The Landelijk Platform van de Pinkster- en Volle Evangeliebeweging
- The Nederlands Gereformeerde Kerken
- The Unie van Baptistengemeenten in Nederland
- The Stichting Zendtijd Evangelische Gemeenten

IKON took care of part of the technical facilities of ZvK, until the closure of both broadcasters.
