= Joodse Omroep =

Dutch public broadcaster

- Type: Public broadcaster
- Country: Netherlands
- Availability: Netherlands
- Owner: Netherlands Public Broadcasting
- Launch date: 1973
- Dissolved: 2015
- Official website: joodseomroep.nl

Joodse Omroep (abbr. JO: English: Jewish Broadcasting Company) was a special broadcaster on the Netherlands Public Broadcasting system, allowed to broadcast on radio and television because of their religious background. It was one of the "2.42 broadcasters" (named after the Article 2.42 of the Mediawet, the Dutch media law, which allowed faith-based broadcasters to get airtime on radio and TV without having to have any members). On 1 January 2016, the Joodse Omroep became part of the Evangelische Omroep due to reconstructions of the public broadcast companies.

They make programming for the Jewish community.
