= Rooms-Katholiek Kerkgenootschap =

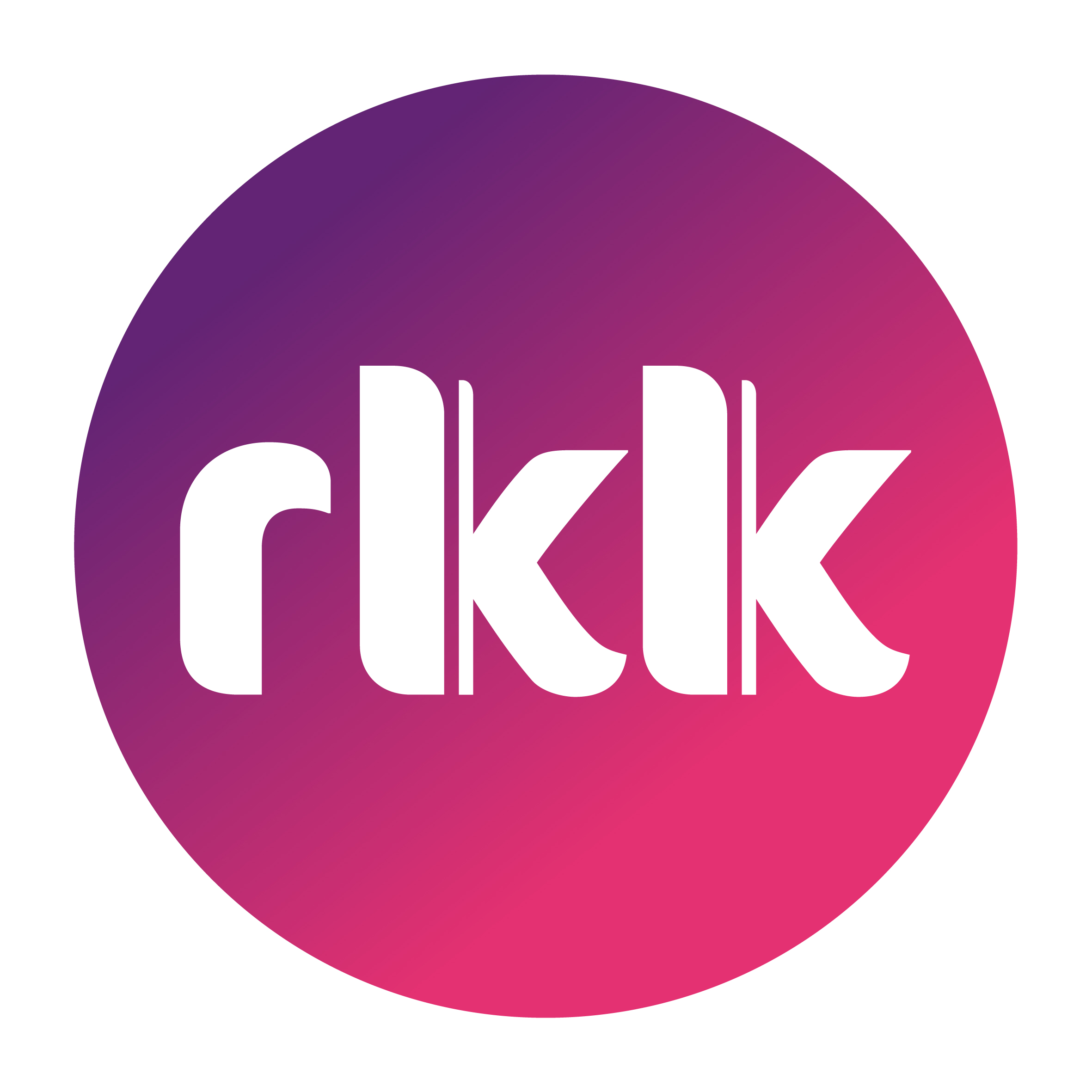
- Type: Public broadcaster
- Country: Netherlands
- Availability: Netherlands
- Founded: 1957
- Owner: Nederlandse Publieke Omroep
- Dissolved: 2016
- Official website: katholieknederland.nl

Rooms-Katholiek Kerkgenootschap (abbr. RKK: English: Roman Catholic Church Association) was a special broadcaster on the Dutch Public Broadcasting system, which was allowed to broadcast on radio and television because of their religious background. Article 2.42 of the Dutch media law (the Mediawet) makes room for faith-based radio and television broadcasters who do not have to have any members, unlike regular public broadcasters (several of which are also faith-based).

Together with the KRO they were responsible for managing broadcasts made by the Catholic Church in the Netherlands. The broadcaster was known for broadcasting Roman Catholic events such as the Urbi et Orbi papal address at Easter and at Christmas.
