= Regio Songfestival =

Dutch song competition

- Genre: Music competition
- Created by: Regionale Omroep Overleg en Samenwerking (ROOS); Comité voor Nederlandse Amusementsmuziek (Conamus)
- Based on: Eurovision Song Contest
- Country of origin: Netherlands
- Original language: Dutch
- No. of episodes: 4 contests

Production
- Running time: ~2 hours

Original release
- Release: 1995, 2023–2025

The Regio Songfestival (Dutch: [ˈreːɣijoː ˈsɔŋfɛstiˌvɑl]; transl. 'Region[al] Song Contest') was a Dutch song competition between regional public broadcasters. The format of the competition was loosely based on the Eurovision Song Contest and was first used in 1995 under its original title Het Nederlandse Songfestival (transl. 'the Dutch Song Contest'). Every edition featured thirteen original songs that were performed in a live broadcast, each representing a region of the Netherlands. From the competing entries, a winner was determined through a combination of televoting and votes cast by regional juries.

== History ==
The format of the competition was first used for the Dutch Song Contest 1995. It was developed by the Regionale Omroep Overleg en Samenwerking (ROOS) – the umbrella organisation of Dutch regional public broadcasters – and the Conamus Foundation to celebrate fifty years of regional public broadcasting in the Netherlands. In addition, it served as a substitute for the Nationaal Songfestival, which was not held in 1995.

Despite ambitions for it to become an annual event, the competition was not renewed for a second edition in 1996. In May 2023, twenty-eight years after the 1995 edition, the thirteen regional public broadcasters announced the launch of a reworked version of the format under the name Regio Songfestival. The inaugural edition was held on 4 November 2023, with a second and third edition held in 2024 and 2025. The annual competition was cancelled following the 2025 edition, as it failed to generate the desired impact.

=== Competition overview ===
Year	Date	Host city	Presenter(s)	Winner			
Year	Date	Host city	Presenter(s)	Region	Artist	Song	Language
1995	25 May	(Utrecht (province)) Utrecht	Karin Bloemen	Groningen	Wia Buze	"Bij alles wat ik doe"	Dutch
2023	4 November	(Utrecht (province)) Utrecht	Stefania Liberakakis, Riks Ozinga and Bernadette Keizer	Limburg	Emmy Ackermans	"'t Letste rundje"	Dutch, Limburgish
2024	9 November	(Limburg (Netherlands)) Maastricht	Lex Uiting, Yaël Weijenberg and Bas van Mulken	Gelderland	Emma Luca	"Illusie"	Dutch
2025	1 November	(Gelderland) Arnhem	Jochem van Gelder, Linda Geerdink and Rik Bronkhorst	Groningen	Iwan and Jeroen	"Alles goud"	Dutch, Low Saxon

=== Overall ranking ===
Rank	Region	Placings				Average
Rank	Region	1995	2023	2024	2025	Average
1	Groningen	1	4	5	1	2.75
2	North Brabant	10	2	3	2	4.25
3	Overijssel	13	3	2	3	5.25
4	North Holland	4	10	4	5	5.75
5	Friesland	3	5	6	10	6.00
6	Utrecht	6	7	11	4	7.00
7	Limburg	12	1	10	6	7.25
8	Gelderland	8	13	1	8	7.50
9	Drenthe	9	8	8	7	8.00
10	West	5	12	7	9	8.25
11	Rijnmond	2	6	13	13	8.50
12	Zeeland	7	11	9	12	9.75
13	Flevoland	11	9	12	11	10.75

== Format ==
Thirteen original songs representing different regions of the Netherlands are performed in a live television show, broadcast simultaneously by all participating broadcasters. A "region" as a participant is represented by its regional public broadcaster – one from each of the twelve provinces, with the exception of South Holland, which is represented by two broadcasters: one serving the province's northern subregions (The Hague and surroundings; presented as "West"), and one serving the southern subregions (Rotterdam and surroundings; presented as "Rijnmond").

Each participating broadcaster has sole discretion over the process it may employ to select its entry for the contest. Entrants may not have had a Top 40 hit prior to participating, and must perform in a regional language or dialect, or in Dutch. Regional contests that have served as a broadcaster's selection process include Liet (Omrop Fryslân) and the Drèents Liedtiesfestival (RTV Drenthe).

The programme is staged by one of the regions and is broadcast from an auditorium in the selected host city. The winner is determined by a combination of votes cast by regional juries (67%) and a public televote (33%). In addition, an AI jury member, named Robin, was introduced in 2025, who evaluates entries based on the quality of their lyrics. Entries cannot receive points from their own regional jury. The participating broadcaster of the winning entry is given the honour of organising the following year's event.

== 2023 edition ==
The first edition of the Regio Songfestival was held on 4 November 2023, beginning at 20:30 CET, and lasted approximately two hours. It was organised by the Netherlands' thirteen regional public broadcasters, with the (financial) support of Buma Cultuur, AVROTROS and the K.F. Hein Fund. The show was broadcast on television by all participating broadcasters, as well as AVROTROS on the national television channel NPO 1 Extra.

=== Competing entries ===
Participants of the Regio Songfestival 2023
Region	Broadcaster	Artist	Song	Language	Songwriter(s)
Drenthe	RTV Drenthe	Lisa Harms	"Tot de zun uutgiet"	Low Saxon (Note: Specifically Drents)	Roy Keuter; Dennis Hendriks; Rowdy Prins
Flevoland	Omroep Flevoland	Abtin Salem	"Kleurenblind"	Dutch	Abtin Salem; Arjan Venemann; Marco Verhagen
Friesland	Omrop Fryslân	Melissa Pander	"Foarby"	West Frisian	Melissa Pander
Gelderland	Omroep Gelderland	AleXingt!	"Treinreis"	Dutch	Alex van der Horst
Groningen	RTV Noord	Wat Aans!	"Wakker in Grunn"	Low Saxon (Note: Specifically Gronings)	Rik Baptist; Teun Heuvel
Limburg	L1	Emmy Ackermans	"'t Letste rundje"	Dutch, Limburgish	Emmy Ackermans; Kirsten Michel; Didier de Ruyter
North Brabant	Omroep Brabant	Sam and Merijn Knoop	"Proost op het leven"	Dutch	Roy Koopmans
North Holland	NH	Emma Koning	"Mag het licht nog één keer aan?"	Dutch	Emma Koning
Overijssel	RTV Oost	Leon Moorman	"Dat ik leef"	Low Saxon	Jord Brinkhuis; Karel Schepers; Leon Moorman
Rijnmond	RTV Rijnmond	Remedy	"Nooit is het genoeg"	Dutch	Jay van Leeuwen; Jurian Mooren; Soraya Oosterbaan; Wendy van der Torre
Utrecht	RTV Utrecht	Melanie Ryan	"Achterom"	Dutch	Melanie Reindertsen
West	Omroep West	Lien	"Waar ben je dan"	Dutch	Dylan Siemerink; Lien Cornelissen
Zeeland	Omroep Zeeland	Smaakstof	"Nacht van de nacht"	Dutch	Dylan den Hartog; Niels Hariot

=== Venue and presenters ===
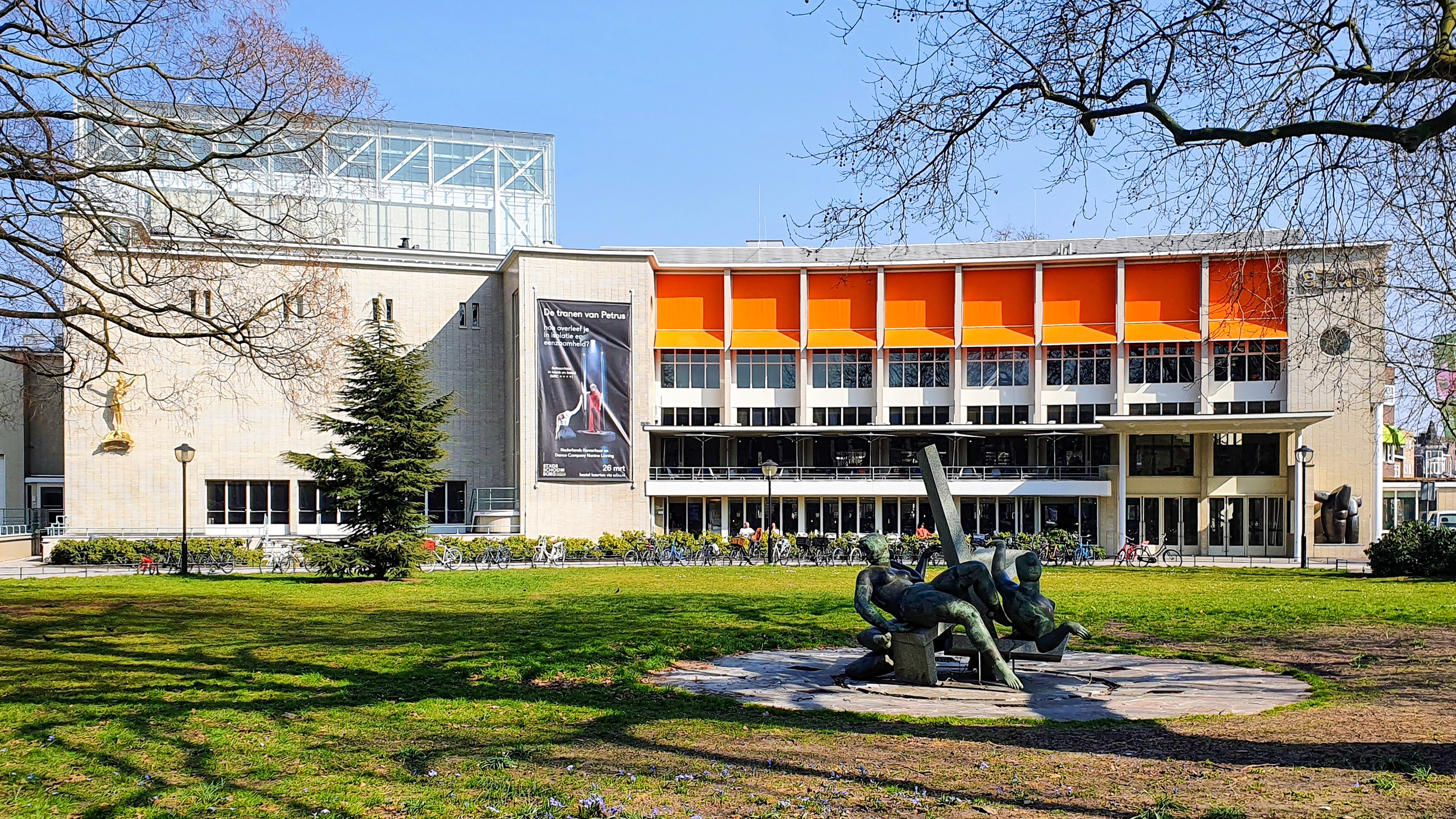
Stadsschouwburg Utrecht, venue of the 2023 edition

RTV Utrecht, the regional public broadcaster of Utrecht, was asked to host the first edition of the Regio Songfestival due to the province's central location within the Netherlands. It was subsequently announced that the event would be staged at the Stadsschouwburg, a theatre in the city of Utrecht. The venue has a capacity of 1,000 spectators.

On 2 October 2023, it was revealed that the show would be hosted by Greek-Dutch singer Stefania Liberakakis, alongside RTV Utrecht reporters Riks Ozinga and Bernadette Keizer. RTV Utrecht announced that Liberakakis and Ozinga would be the show's main presenters, while Keizer would serve as the green room host.

=== Contest overview ===
The running order for the live show was published on 27 October 2023. The ABBA tribute band We Want ABBA!, featuring singers Mandy Huydts and Sandy Kandau, performed as an interval act.

R/O	Region	Artist	Song	Points	Place
1	Friesland	Melissa Pander	"Foarby"	159	5
2	Overijssel	Leon Moorman	"Dat ik leef"	172	3
3	Gelderland	AleXingt!	"Treinreis"	41	13
4	Zeeland	Smaakstof	"Nacht van de nacht"	78	11
5	Drenthe	Lisa Harms	"Tot de zun uutgiet"	96	8
6	Limburg	Emmy Ackermans	"'t Letste rundje"	177	1
7	Rijnmond	Remedy	"Nooit is het genoeg"	148	6
8	Utrecht	Melanie Ryan	"Achterom"	102	7
9	North Brabant	Sam and Merijn Knoop	"Proost op het leven"	172	2
10	Groningen	Wat Aans!	"Wakker in Grunn"	172	4
11	Flevoland	Abtin Salem	"Kleurenblind"	84	9
12	North Holland	Emma Koning	"Mag het licht nog één keer aan?"	80	10
13	West	Lien	"Waar ben je dan"	49	12

==== Spokespersons ====
The 10, 11 and 12-point scores from the juries were announced by a spokesperson from each region in the following order:

1. Friesland – Iris Kroes
2. Overijssel – Willie Oosterhuis
3. Gelderland – Linda Geerdink
4. Zeeland – Elsa van Hermon
5. Drenthe – René Steenbergen
6. Limburg – Henk Hover
7. Rijnmond – Esther Hart
8. Utrecht – Pearl Jozefzoon
9. North Brabant – Tom van den Oetelaar
10. Groningen – Wia Buze
11. Flevoland – Marco Verhagen
12. North Holland – Maarten Faber
13. West – Dennis Weening and Celine Huijsmans

==== Detailed voting results ====
Split results
Place	Combined		Jury		Public	
Place	Region	Points	Region	Points	Region	Points
1	Limburg	177	North Brabant	120	Groningen	78
2	North Brabant	172	Overijssel	113	Friesland	72
3	Overijssel	172	Limburg	112	Limburg	65
4	Groningen	172	Rijnmond	102	Overijssel	59
5	Friesland	159	Groningen	94	North Brabant	52
6	Rijnmond	148	Friesland	87	Rijnmond	46
7	Utrecht	102	Utrecht	76	Flevoland	39
8	Drenthe	96	North Holland	73	Drenthe	33
9	Flevoland	84	Zeeland	65	Utrecht	26
10	North Holland	80	Drenthe	63	Gelderland	20
11	Zeeland	78	Flevoland	45	Zeeland	13
12	West	49	West	43	North Holland	7
13	Gelderland	41	Gelderland	21	West	6

Voting procedure used: 67% jury vote 33% televoting		Total score	Jury vote score	Televoting score	Jury vote												
Voting procedure used: 67% jury vote 33% televoting		Total score	Jury vote score	Televoting score	Friesland	Overijssel	Gelderland	Zeeland	Drenthe	Limburg	Rijnmond	Utrecht	North Brabant	Groningen	Flevoland	North Holland	West
Contestants	Friesland	159	87	72		10	6	7	5	8	9	4	8	7	5	9	9
Contestants	Overijssel	172	113	59	9		9	9	12	11	11	10	6	12	6	12	6
Contestants	Gelderland	41	21	20	1	1		1	3	3	2	1	1	1	2	4	1
Contestants	Zeeland	78	65	13	10	5	5		4	7	3	5	4	4	8	5	5
Contestants	Drenthe	96	63	33	8	6	7	2		6	6	2	5	10	7	2	2
Contestants	Limburg	177	112	65	7	8	11	5	9		8	12	12	8	9	11	12
Contestants	Rijnmond	148	102	46	5	9	8	10	7	9		11	9	11	4	8	11
Contestants	Utrecht	102	76	26	6	4	2	3	1	12	12		7	5	10	6	8
Contestants	North Brabant	172	120	52	11	11	10	11	8	10	10	9		9	11	10	10
Contestants	Groningen	172	94	78	12	12	12	12	11	5	5	3	11		3	1	7
Contestants	Flevoland	84	45	39	2	3	1	4	10	2	4	7	3	2		3	4
Contestants	North Holland	80	73	7	3	7	3	8	2	4	7	8	10	6	12		3
Contestants	West	49	43	6	4	2	4	6	6	1	1	6	2	3	1	7	

12 points awarded by juries
#	Recipient	Regions giving 12 points
4	Groningen	Friesland, Gelderland, Overijssel, Zeeland
3	Limburg	North Brabant, Utrecht, West
3	Overijssel	Drenthe, Groningen, North Holland
2	Utrecht	Limburg, Rijnmond
1	North Holland	Flevoland

== 2024 edition ==
The second edition of Regio Songfestival was held on 9 November 2024, beginning at 20:30 CET, and lasted approximately two hours. It was organised by L1, the regional public broadcaster of Limburg, following its victory in the 2023 edition. The show was broadcast on television by all participating broadcasters, as well as AVROTROS on the national television channel NPO 1 Extra.

=== Competing entries ===
Participants of the Regio Songfestival 2024
Region	Broadcaster	Artist	Song	Language	Songwriter(s)
Drenthe	RTV Drenthe	Marianne Veenstra	"'t Is zo wisse (as een klontie zuut is)"	Low Saxon	Marianne Veenstra
Flevoland	Omroep Flevoland	Sanne-Maaike Oudshoorn	"Wil ik anders"	Dutch	Sanne-Maaike Oudshoorn
Friesland	Omrop Fryslân	Fegebart	"Bingojûn"	West Frisian	Piter Reitsma; Jehannes Reitsma; Anne Martin Koree; Inge de Vries
Gelderland	Omroep Gelderland	Emma Luca	"Illusie"	Dutch	Emma Lukassen; Tariq Pijning; Wies Knipping
Groningen	RTV Noord	Trap Aan!	"Ien de keet"	Low Saxon	René Siertsema; Ronald Jongsma
Limburg	L1	Maxime and Glyn	"Oceaan"	Dutch	Giuseppe Gallitelli; Glyn Hoogvliets; Maxime Cathalina; Svibor Perković
North Brabant	Omroep Brabant	Dominique de Bont	"Wie we waren"	Dutch	David Westmeijer; Didier de Ruyter; Dominique de Bont; Jochem Fluitsma; Mark van Tijn
North Holland	NH	Renee Rose	"Meisje met een droom"	Dutch	Luc Weegels; Renee Schnater
Overijssel	RTV Oost	Merlijn Dewasme	"Adem"	Dutch	Christiaan Frölich; Julia Cremers; Loes Koedoot; Luuk Hoogeveen; Merlijn Dewasme; Teun van der Salm; Timo Stevens
Rijnmond	RTV Rijnmond	Braidy	"Banaan"	Dutch	Brian Haak; Giovanni Crama
Utrecht	RTV Utrecht	Thijs Swinkels	"Wanneer zie ik je weer?"	Dutch	Mark Pepping; Teunes Tony Neef; Thijs Swinkels
West	Omroep West	Kopsmart	"'Ier lêt me 'art"	Schevenings	Arie Spaans
Zeeland	Omroep Zeeland	Cycz	"Oceaan"	Dutch	Bram Mvambanu; Jesse van de Ketterij

=== Venue and presenters ===
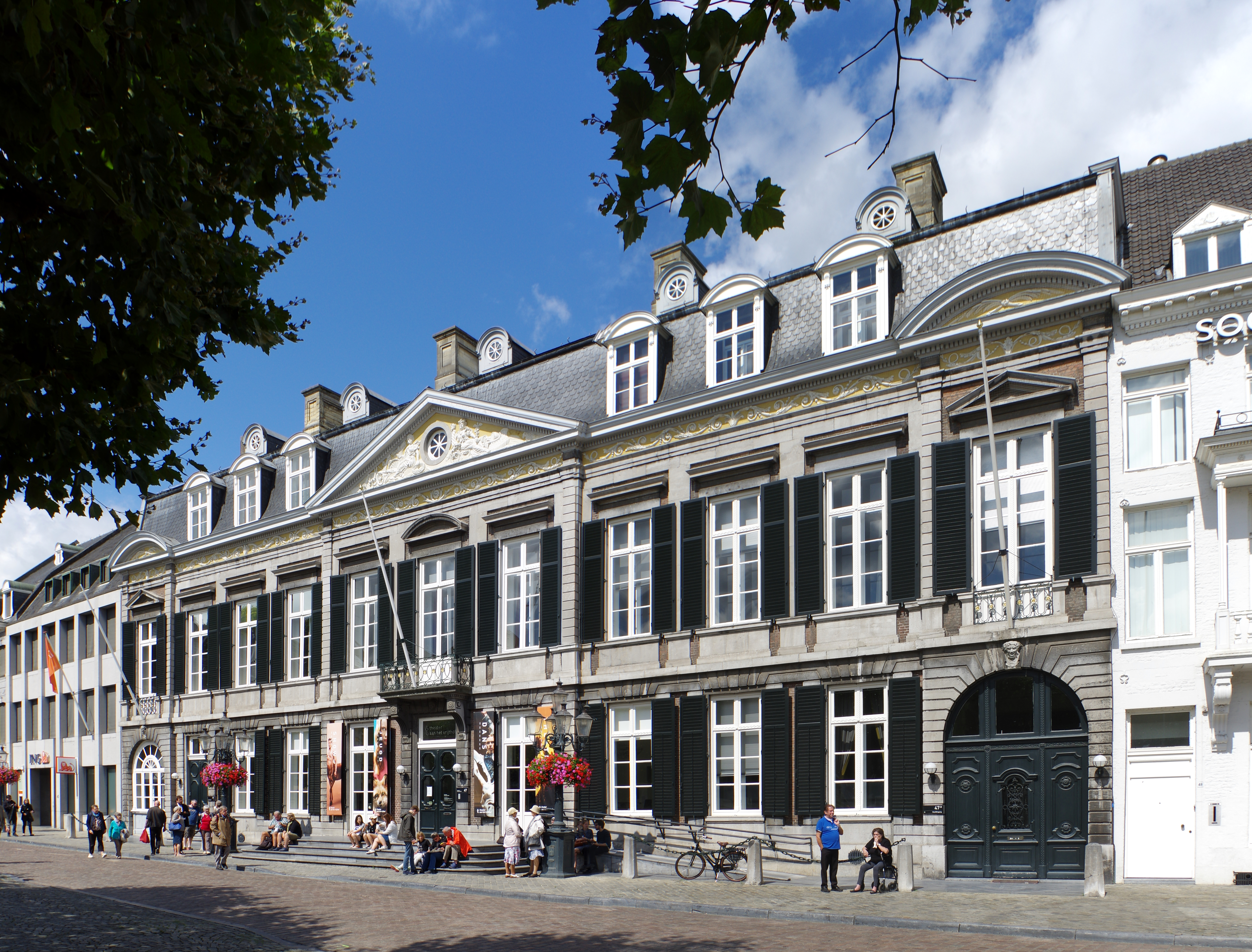
Theater aan het Vrijthof, venue of the 2024 edition

The event was staged at the Theater aan het Vrijthof in Maastricht. The venue has a capacity of 915 spectators. On 4 July 2024, it was revealed that the show would be hosted by presenter and singer Lex Uiting, alongside L1 reporters Yaël Camille Weijenberg and Riël Linssen. Linssen was later replaced by Bas van Mulken, who served as the green room host.

=== Contest overview ===
The running order for the live show was published on 11 October 2024. Singer John Tana performed the song "Daan kom iech mer aon" as an interval act.

R/O	Region	Artist	Song	Points	Place
1	Utrecht	Thijs Swinkels	"Wanneer zie ik je weer?"	78	11
2	Drenthe	Marianne Veenstra	"'t Is zo wisse (as een klontie zuut is)"	101	8
3	Overijssel	Merlijn Dewasme	"Adem"	171	2
4	Zeeland	Cycz	"Oceaan"	92	9
5	West	Kopsmart	"'Ier lêt me 'art"	110	7
6	North Brabant	Dominique de Bont	"Wie we waren"	169	3
7	Limburg	Maxime and Glyn	"Oceaan"	81	10
8	North Holland	Renee Rose	"Meisje met een droom"	151	4
9	Friesland	Fegebart	"Bingojûn"	134	6
10	Flevoland	Sanne-Maaike Oudshoorn	"Wil ik anders"	60	12
11	Gelderland	Emma Luca	"Illusie"	193	1
12	Rijnmond	Braidy	"Banaan"	49	13
13	Groningen	Trap Aan!	"Ien de keet"	141	5

==== Spokespersons ====
The 10, 11 and 12-point scores from the juries were announced by a spokesperson from each region in the following order:

1. Utrecht – Pearl Jozefzoon
2. Drenthe – René Steenbergen
3. Overijssel – Willie Oosterhuis
4. Zeeland – Elsa van Hermon
5. West – Tess Merlot
6. North Brabant – Tom van den Oetelaar
7. Limburg – Maxime Cabo
8. North Holland – Maarten Faber
9. Friesland – Sipke Jan Bousema
10. Flevoland – Roy Blokzijl
11. Gelderland – Eric van den Berg
12. Rijnmond – Joan Franka
13. Groningen – Rik Baptist

==== Detailed voting results ====
Split results
Place	Combined		Jury		Public	
Place	Region	Points	Region	Points	Region	Points
1	Gelderland	193	Gelderland	121	Groningen	78
2	Overijssel	171	North Brabant	110	Gelderland	72
3	North Brabant	169	Overijssel	106	Overijssel	65
4	North Holland	151	North Holland	105	North Brabant	59
5	Groningen	141	Friesland	95	Zeeland	52
6	Friesland	134	West	84	North Holland	46
7	West	110	Drenthe	81	Friesland	39
8	Drenthe	101	Utrecht	72	Limburg	33
9	Zeeland	92	Groningen	63	West	26
10	Limburg	81	Limburg	48	Drenthe	20
11	Utrecht	78	Flevoland	47	Flevoland	13
12	Flevoland	60	Rijnmond	42	Rijnmond	7
13	Rijnmond	49	Zeeland	40	Utrecht	6

Voting procedure used: 67% jury vote 33% televoting		Total score	Jury vote score	Televoting score	Jury vote												
Voting procedure used: 67% jury vote 33% televoting		Total score	Jury vote score	Televoting score	Utrecht	Drenthe	Overijssel	Zeeland	West	North Brabant	Limburg	North Holland	Friesland	Flevoland	Gelderland	Rijnmond	Groningen
Contestants	Utrecht	78	72	6		9	5	10	4	5	7	5	1	11	8	4	3
Contestants	Drenthe	101	81	20	7		8	5	6	9	8	9	12	3	7	3	4
Contestants	Overijssel	171	106	65	11	6		8	9	6	9	8	11	9	10	9	10
Contestants	Zeeland	92	40	52	5	4	2		5	1	1	1	4	1	6	5	5
Contestants	West	110	84	26	8	12	10	2		10	2	7	8	2	11	1	11
Contestants	North Brabant	169	110	59	10	7	9	9	8		10	12	9	7	9	11	9
Contestants	Limburg	81	48	33	4	3	4	3	1	2		2	7	5	5	10	2
Contestants	North Holland	151	105	46	9	5	6	12	10	11	12		6	10	12	6	6
Contestants	Friesland	134	95	39	3	10	12	4	12	8	4	10		6	2	12	12
Contestants	Flevoland	60	47	13	6	1	3	6	7	3	3	4	5		1	7	1
Contestants	Gelderland	193	121	72	12	11	11	11	11	12	11	11	3	12		8	8
Contestants	Rijnmond	49	42	7	1	2	1	7	3	4	5	3	2	4	3		7
Contestants	Groningen	141	63	78	2	8	7	1	2	7	6	6	10	8	4	2	

12 points awarded by juries
#	Recipient	Regions giving 12 points
4	Friesland	Groningen, Overijssel, Rijnmond, West
3	Gelderland	Flevoland, North Brabant, Utrecht,
3	North Holland	Gelderland, Limburg, Zeeland
1	Drenthe	Friesland
1	North Brabant	North Holland
1	West	Drenthe

== 2025 edition ==
The third edition of Regio Songfestival was held on 1 November 2025 at 20:30 CET, and lasted approximately two hours. It was organised by Omroep Gelderland after their win in the previous year's edition. The show was broadcast on television by all participating broadcasters, as well as AVROTROS on the national television channel NPO 1 Extra.

=== Competing entries ===
Participants of the Regio Songfestival 2025
Region	Broadcaster	Artist	Song	Language	Songwriter(s)
Drenthe	RTV Drenthe	De Broers Roo	"Olde Jetta"	Low Saxon	Alfred Roo; Jaap Roo
Flevoland	Omroep Flevoland	Luca Ferron	"Morgen heb ik spijt"	Dutch	Bas Kok; Joshua Sambo; Luca Ferron
Friesland	Omrop Fryslân	Anke Stilma	"Wêrom"	West Frisian	Anke Stilma
Gelderland	Omroep Gelderland	Droadneagels	"Kandatannogandesdan"	Low Saxon (Note: Specifically Achterhoeks)	Daan Smit; Jari Janssen; Jeroen Toonk; Sem Lenderink
Groningen	RTV Noord	Iwan and Jeroen	"Alles goud"	Dutch, Low Saxon	Iwan Esajas; Jeroen Russchen; Rik Baptist
Limburg	L1	Fourtune	"Geluksdag"	Dutch	Eva Custers; Jip Verdellen; Tim Stoter; William Daelemans
North Brabant	Omroep Brabant	Rosa Spruit	"Geen woorden op papier"	Dutch	Rosa Spruit
North Holland	NH	Kelsey Verbrugge	"Bij jou ben ik thuis"	Dutch	Julia van Helvoirt; Lars Koehoorn; Wesly Bronkhorst
Overijssel	RTV Oost	Poelepetaten	"Zo gezegd"	Low Saxon (Note: Specifically Sallands)	Morten Boerman
Rijnmond	RTV Rijnmond	Flora	"In het rood"	Dutch	Denise Nathalie Voss
Utrecht	RTV Utrecht	Dyde	"Laat maar"	Dutch	Diede Vendrig; Thom Buitelaar
West	Omroep West	Driewieler	"Gelukt?"	Dutch	Julia Schutten; Silas Houtman; Thomas Heikoop
Zeeland	Omroep Zeeland	Tarzan & the Beachwaiters	"Buitenbenen"	Dutch	Dmitri van Hoof; Niels Poppe; Sebastian Akkerdaas

=== Venue and presenters ===
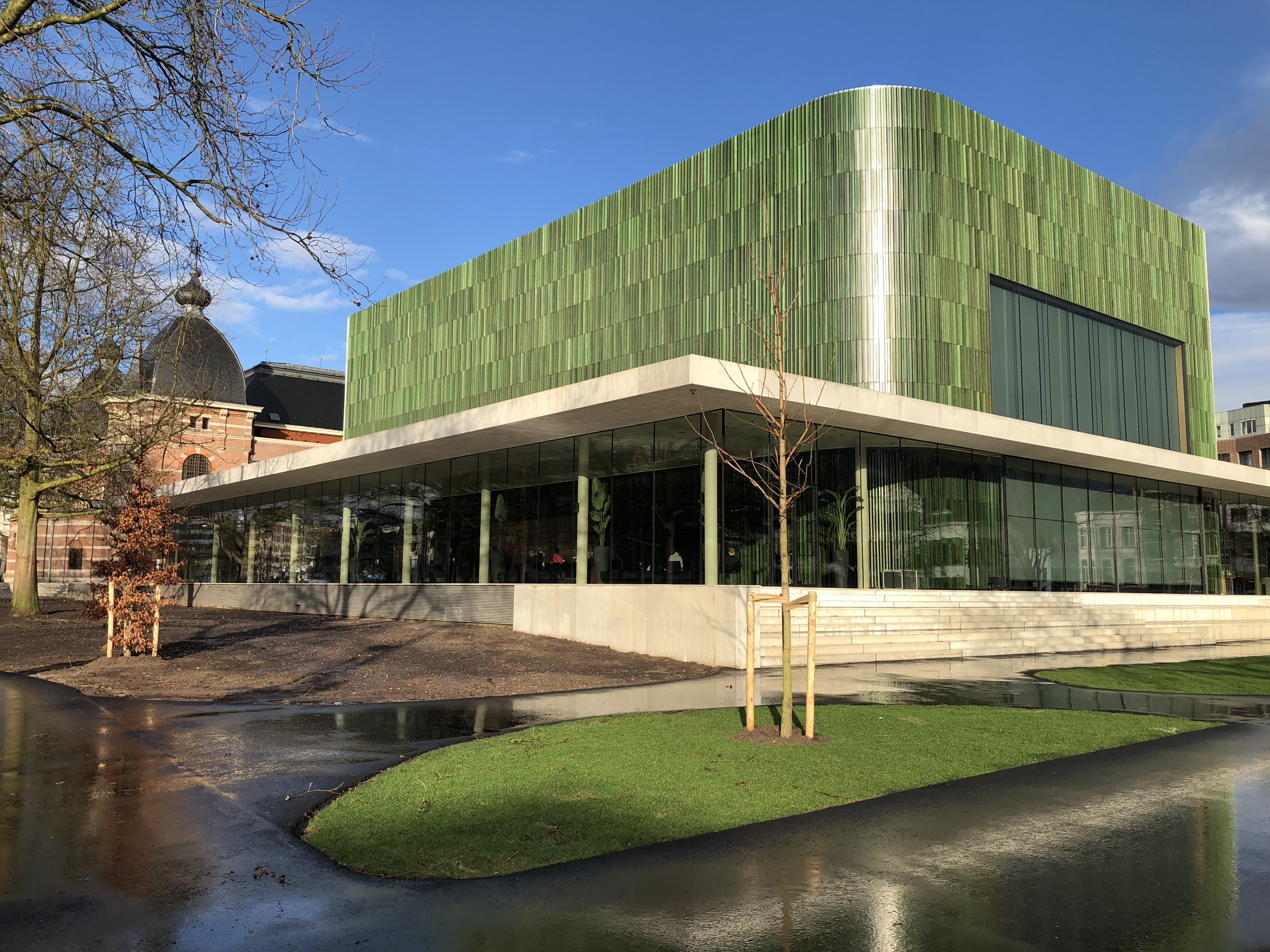
Musis & Stadstheater (Parkzaal), venue of the 2025 edition

On 26 April 2025, it was announced that the contest would be staged at the Musis & Stadstheater in Arnhem. On 3 June 2025, Omroep Gelderland unveiled that Jochem van Gelder, Linda Geerdink and Rik Bronkhorst would host the event, all three being TV and radio presenters at the broadcaster.

=== Contest overview ===
The running order for the live show was published on 8 October 2025. Sieneke performed her 2010 Eurovision entry "Ik ben verliefd (Sha-la-lie)" as an interval act.

R/O	Region	Artist	Song	Points	Place
1	Groningen	Iwan and Jeroen	"Alles goud"	222	1
2	North Brabant	Rosa Spruit	"Geen woorden op papier"	162	2
3	West	Driewieler	"Gelukt?"	103	9
4	Drenthe	De Broers Roo	"Olde Jetta"	135	7
5	Friesland	Anke Stilma	"Wêrom"	94	10
6	Utrecht	Dyde	"Laat maar"	144	4
7	Rijnmond	Flora	"In het rood"	60	13
8	Overijssel	Poelepetaten	"Zo gezegd"	158	3
9	North Holland	Kelsey Verbrugge	"Bij jou ben ik thuis"	140	5
10	Limburg	Fourtune	"Geluksdag"	139	6
11	Flevoland	Luca Ferron	"Morgen heb ik spijt"	81	11
12	Gelderland	Droadneagels	"Kandatannogandesdan"	127	8
13	Zeeland	Tarzan & the Beachwaiters	"Buitenbenen"	79	12

==== Spokespersons ====
The 10, 11 and 12-point scores from the juries were announced by a spokesperson from each region in the following order:

1. Groningen – René Siertsema
2. West – Bob Brinkman
3. Drenthe – Wim Boer
4. Friesland – Wim Brons
5. Utrecht – Melanie Ryan
6. North Brabant – Dominique de Bont
7. Rijnmond – Joan Franka
8. Overijssel – Merlijn Dewasme
9. North Holland – Maarten Faber
10. Limburg – Emmy Ackermans
11. Flevoland – Roy Blokzijl
12. Gelderland – Esther Stegeman
13. Zeeland – Elsa van Hermon
14. AI jury – Robin

==== Detailed voting results ====
Split results
Place	Combined		Jury		Public	
Place	Region	Points	Region	Points	Region	Points
1	Groningen	222	Groningen	138	Groningen	84
2	North Brabant	162	North Holland	126	Overijssel	77
3	Overijssel	158	Utrecht	102	North Brabant	70
4	Utrecht	144	West	96	Gelderland	63
5	North Holland	140	North Brabant	92	Limburg	56
6	Limburg	139	Drenthe	86	Drenthe	49
7	Drenthe	135	Limburg	83	Utrecht	42
8	Gelderland	127	Overijssel	81	Friesland	35
9	West	103	Gelderland	64	Zeeland	28
10	Friesland	94	Flevoland	60	Flevoland	21
11	Flevoland	81	Friesland	59	North Holland	14
12	Zeeland	79	Rijnmond	54	West	7
13	Rijnmond	60	Zeeland	51	Rijnmond	6

Voting procedure used: 67% jury vote 33% televoting		Total score	Jury vote score	Televoting score	Jury vote													
Voting procedure used: 67% jury vote 33% televoting		Total score	Jury vote score	Televoting score	Groningen	North Brabant	West	Drenthe	Friesland	Utrecht	Rijnmond	Overijssel	North Holland	Limburg	Flevoland	Gelderland	Zeeland	AI jury
Contestants	Groningen	222	138	84		12	10	12	12	11	6	8	12	9	11	12	12	11
Contestants	North Brabant	162	92	70	11		7	5	4	9	5	5	6	6	10	5	9	10
Contestants	West	103	96	7	2	9		10	9	12	9	10	9	11	5	2	7	1
Contestants	Drenthe	135	86	49	8	6	5		10	6	7	6	3	10	4	11	2	8
Contestants	Friesland	94	59	35	7	4	4	8		3	1	4	10	3	1	1	1	12
Contestants	Utrecht	144	102	42	5	8	12	7	6		10	7	11	5	9	6	10	6
Contestants	Rijnmond	60	54	6	3	3	1	2	1	8		9	4	4	2	4	6	7
Contestants	Overijssel	158	81	77	10	10	3	9	2	4	4		7	7	8	8	5	4
Contestants	North Holland	140	126	14	9	11	11	11	11	10	8	11		12	12	10	8	2
Contestants	Limburg	139	83	56	1	2	9	6	5	7	3	12	8		7	9	11	3
Contestants	Flevoland	81	60	21	4	5	8	1	3	5	11	3	5	8		3	4	0
Contestants	Gelderland	127	64	63	6	7	2	3	8	2	12	2	2	2	6		3	9
Contestants	Zeeland	79	51	28	12	1	6	4	7	1	2	1	1	1	3	7		5

12 points awarded by juries
#	Recipient	Regions giving 12 points
6	Groningen	Drenthe, Friesland, Gelderland, North Brabant, North Holland, Zeeland
2	North Holland	Flevoland, Limburg
1	Friesland	AI jury
1	Gelderland	Rijnmond
1	Limburg	Overijssel
1	Utrecht	West
1	West	Utrecht
1	Zeeland	Groningen

== See also ==
- American Song Contest
- Bundesvision Song Contest
- Liet International
