= Dutch Song Contest 1995 =

One-off contest between Dutch regional broadcasters

Date and venue
- Final: 25 May 1995
- Venue: Muziekcentrum Vredenburg; Utrecht, Netherlands

Organisation
- Organiser: Regionale Omroep Overleg en Samenwerking (ROOS); Conamus Foundation
- Presenter: Karin Bloemen

Participants
- Number of entries: 13

Vote
- Winning song: Groningen "Bij alles wat ik doe"

The Dutch Song Contest 1995 (Dutch: Het Nederlandse Songfestival 1995) was a one-off song competition between regional public broadcasters in the Netherlands. The contest was held on 25 May 1995 at the Muziekcentrum Vredenburg in Utrecht and was hosted by Karin Bloemen. It served as a substitute for the Nationaal Songfestival, the Dutch annual selection show for the Eurovision Song Contest, which was not held that year due to the Netherlands' relegation from the Eurovision Song Contest following an insufficient result in the 1994 edition.

While the competition was not renewed for a second edition, a reworked version of the format was launched in 2023 under the name Regio Songfestival.

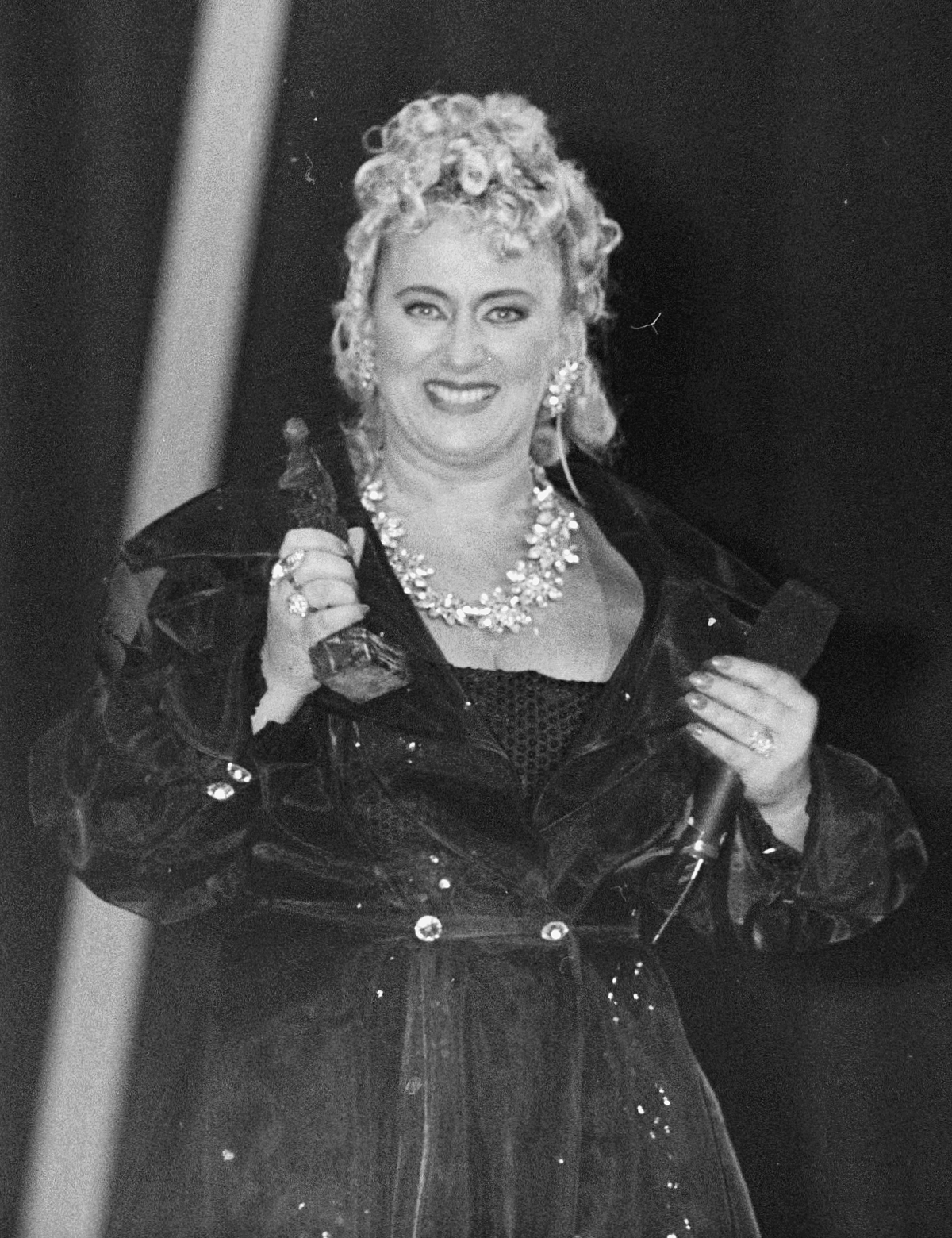
Karin Bloemen, the show's presenter, in 1994

== Background ==
The format of the competition was developed by the Regionale Omroep Overleg en Samenwerking (ROOS) – the umbrella organisation of Dutch regional public broadcasters – and the Conamus Foundation. It was decided to stage the event on Ascension Day in 1995 to celebrate the 50th anniversary of Omroep Limburg (founded in 1945 as Regionale Omroep Zuid), marking half a century of regional public broadcasting in the Netherlands. In addition, the event would fill the void left by the Nationaal Songfestival, which would not be held that year due to the Netherlands' exclusion from the Eurovision Song Contest 1995.

Although the contest was not intended as a substitute for the Eurovision Song Contest itself, there were plans for the format to potentially replace the Nationaal Songfestival as the Dutch national selection process in future years. Its main objective, however, was to provide a platform for regional artists to present themselves to a broader audience.

== Format and participants ==
All thirteen regional public broadcasters participated in the competition – each representing one of the twelve provinces, with the exception of South Holland, which was represented by two broadcasters: one serving the province's northern subregions (The Hague and surroundings; presented as "West"), and one serving the southern subregions (Rotterdam and surroundings; presented as "Rijnmond").

Only songs in Dutch were eligible to enter the competition. After the submission window opened in November 1994, a call for entries was published in the December issue of Buma/Stemra Magazine. More than 600 original compositions were received, from which an expert jury led by Conamus director John de Mol Sr. selected ten entries. In addition, three composers were personally commissioned to write an entry for the competition.

Each of the thirteen entries was assigned to a regional broadcaster, which selected its own representative to perform the song. Each broadcaster also appointed one jury member, who would distribute points to the other regions' entries based on their personal preference and the opinions of two listeners from their region. The entry that received the most points would win the competition. In the event of a tie, the entry that received the most top scores (10 points) from the juries would be declared the winner.

Participants of the Dutch Song Contest 1995
Region	Broadcaster	Artist	Song	Songwriter(s)
Drenthe	Radio Drenthe	Eri-Kah	"Ik ben verliefd"	Elbert Kok
Flevoland	Omroep Flevoland	Rudy Ray	"Een leven zonder jou"	Gaby Dirne
Friesland	Omrop Fryslân	Gina	"Ga je mee?"	Kees Smit
Gelderland	Omroep Gelderland	Margriet Markerink	"Huid en haar"	Jeroen Kramer; Joop Maes
Groningen	Radio Noord	Wia Buze	"Bij alles wat ik doe"	Kees Smit
Limburg	Omroep Limburg	Etienne Borgers	"Wie kan zonder?"	Ernst Reichrath; Gregor Theelen
North Brabant	Omroep Brabant	Roland Verstappen	"Hou me vast"	Marieke Bootsma; Habbo Beem
North Holland	Radio Noord-Holland	Jacques Kloes	"Een leugentje om bestwil"	Eddy de Heer; Danny de Heer; Hans van Vondelen
Overijssel	Radio Oost	Helene Heine	"Net als een droom"	Kees Smit
Rijnmond	Radio Rijnmond	Joke Bruijs	"De laatste dans"	Rowin Schumm
Utrecht	Radio Utrecht	Peter Douglas	"Mijn beste kameraad"	Boudewijn Spitzen; Lucy Steymel; Koen van Baal
West	Radio West	Nurlaila	"Blijf jij bij mij?"	Kees Smit
Zeeland	Omroep Zeeland	Peter Adriaanse	"De woorden, die schieten tekort"	Annemiek Woudt; Michiel Pos

== Contest overview ==
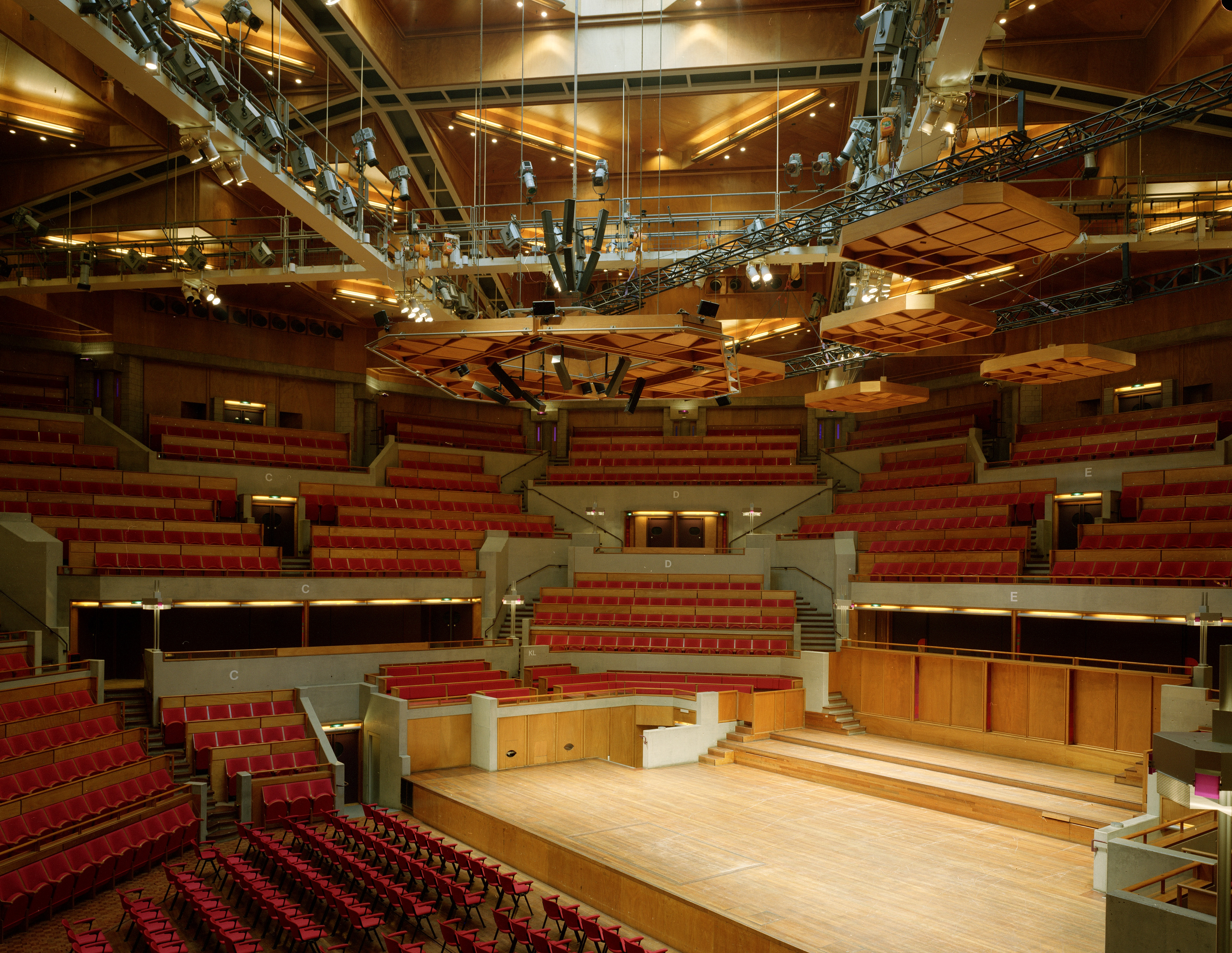
Muziekcentrum Vredenburg's Grote Zaal, venue of the contest

Broadcast exclusively on radio, the contest was held on Thursday 25 May 1995, beginning at 21:00 CEST, and lasted two hours. The event was staged in the Grote Zaal ('Great Hall') of Muziekcentrum Vredenburg, a music venue in Utrecht, in front of an audience of around 1,000 people. The live performances were accompanied by a backing track, and featured a slide show for the audience at the venue. The show was hosted by Dutch singer and cabaret performer Karin Bloemen, who also performed as an interval act.

=== Results ===
The winner was Groningen represented by the song "Bij alles wat ik doe", composed by Kees Smit and performed by Wia Buze. Buze had won the jury vote by a small margin ahead of runner-up Joke Bruijs, who represented the Rijnmond region. As the winning composer, Smit won ƒ10,000 (equivalent to €8,820.22 in 2024) in prize money, while Buze was awarded promotional airplay on the participating broadcasters' radio stations and a trip to London.

Results of the Dutch Song Contest 1995
R/O	Region	Artist	Song	Points	Place
1	Gelderland	Margriet Markerink	"Huid en haar"	71	8
2	Zeeland	Peter Adriaanse	"De woorden, die schieten tekort"	75	7
3	Groningen	Wia Buze	"Bij alles wat ik doe"	123	1
4	Limburg	Etienne Borgers	"Wie kan zonder?"	48	12
5	Friesland	Gina	"Ga je mee?"	93	3
6	North Holland	Jacques Kloes	"Een leugentje om bestwil"	82	4
7	Drenthe	Eri-Kah	"Ik ben verliefd"	69	9
8	Flevoland	Rudy Ray	"Een leven zonder jou"	51	11
9	Rijnmond	Joke Bruijs	"De laatste dans"	115	2
10	North Brabant	Roland Verstappen	"Hou me vast"	53	10
11	Overijssel	Helene Heine	"Net als een droom"	10	13
12	Utrecht	Peter Douglas	"Mijn beste kameraad"	78	6
13	West	Nurlaila	"Blijf jij bij mij?"	80	5

== Reception ==
External videos
- Peter Adriaanse performing at the 1995 contest (footage from Omroep Zeeland)

The show was met with a negative critical reception, due to the alleged low quality of the performances. Despite ambitions for it to become an annual event, the competition was ultimately not renewed for a second edition in 1996. Instead, the regional broadcasters were invited by the Nederlandse Omroep Stichting (NOS) to contribute to the organisation of the Nationaal Songfestival 1996.

Two contestants of the Dutch Song Contest, Roland Verstappen (North Brabant) and Gina de Wit (Friesland), were selected to compete in the Nationaal Songfestival 1996. The songwriters of the Zeelandic entry "De woorden, die schieten tekort" – Michel Pos and Annemiek Woudt – also entered the festival with the song "Neem me mee", performed by Lucretia van der Vloot.

In June 1995, an official compilation album of the contest was released by EMI Music Holland. Wia Buze, whose repertoire had consisted primarily of songs in Gronings dialect, released a studio album entirely in Dutch following her win in the contest.

In 2023, twenty-eight years after the contest, a reworked version of the format was launched under the name Regio Songfestival.
