= Regionale Publieke Omroep =

Dutch public broadcasting organisation

- Abbreviation: RPO
- Predecessor: Regionale Omroep Overleg en Samenwerking (ROOS)
- Formation: 31 May 2016; 9 years ago
- Legal status: Stichting
- Headquarters: Joop van den Endeplein 1, Hilversum
- Location: Netherlands
- Executive director: Jan Müller
- Website: www.stichtingrpo.nl

Stichting Regionale Publieke Omroep (RPO), or the Regional Public Broadcasting Foundation, is the umbrella organisation of regional public broadcasters in the Netherlands. It is tasked with the promotion of co-operation between regional broadcasters, and represents their interests on a national and international level. The purpose and organisation of the RPO is similar to the NPO (for national broadcasters) and the NLPO (for local broadcasters).

== History ==
The RPO was founded on 31 May 2016 by its predecessor, Stichting Regionale Omroep Overleg en Samenwerking (ROOS, lit. 'Regional Broadcasting Consultation and Co-operation Foundation'). Its formation was the result of an adaptation of the Media Act 2008, initiated by the second Rutte cabinet. The ROOS, which had been established in 1988, legally merged into the RPO on 1 July 2017.

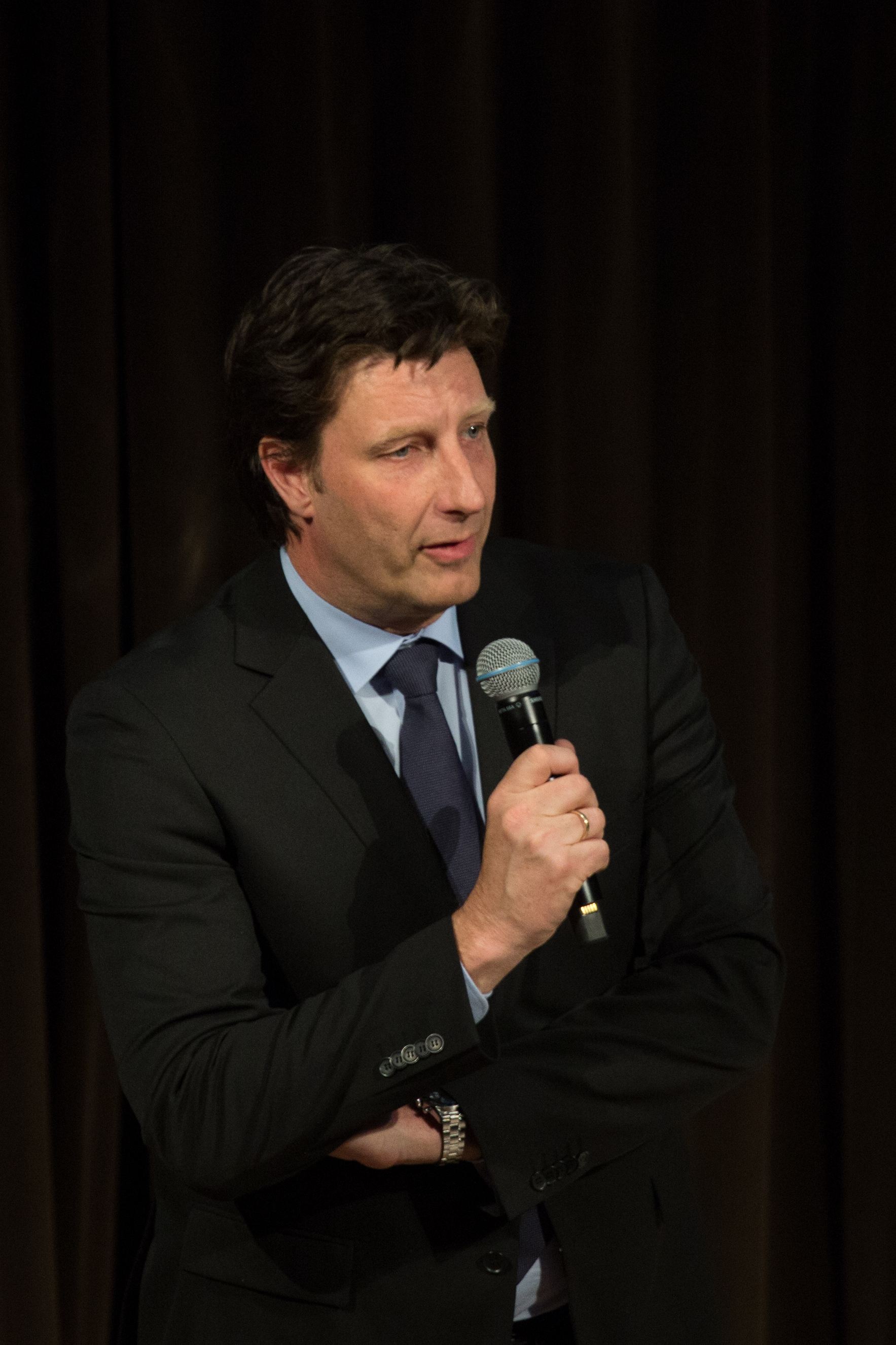
Jan Müller, executive director since 2021

The RPO is a member of CIRCOM. On 1 February 2021, Jan Müller was appointed executive director of the RPO.

== Duties ==
The RPO is charged with the following duties, as set down in article 2.60a of the Media Act 2008:

1. promoting co-operation and co-ordination with regard to the execution of the public media task at the regional level;
2. looking after matters of common interest to the regional public media service and the regional public media institutions;
3. concluding collective agreements and establishing standards for the remuneration of freelancers, also on behalf of regional public media institutions;
4. promoting the efficient use of the funds intended for the provision and distribution of the media content and promoting integrated financial reporting and accountability;
5. establishing, maintaining, managing, operating and regulating the use of bodies, services and facilities, including studios and distribution infrastructures, necessary for the proper execution of the public media task at the regional level;
6. other duties entrusted to it by law.

== Member broadcasters ==
- L1 (Limburg)
- NH (North Holland)
- Omroep Brabant (North Brabant)
- Omroep Flevoland (Flevoland)
- Omroep Gelderland (Gelderland)
- Omroep West (Northern South Holland)
- Omroep Zeeland (Zeeland)
- Omrop Fryslân (Friesland)
- RTV Drenthe (Drenthe)
- RTV Noord (Groningen)
- RTV Oost (Overijssel)
- RTV Rijnmond (Southern South Holland)
- RTV Utrecht (Utrecht)

== See also ==
- Dutch public broadcasting system
- Regio Songfestival
