= Ajaxjournaal =

Dutch football magazine TV show

- Created by: Maarten Bax; Onno Vos
- Country of origin: Netherlands
- Original language: Dutch

Production
- Running time: 10 minutes

Original release
- Network: RTV N-H
- Release: 2004 – 2007

Ajaxjournaal is a Dutch football news magazine revolving around AFC Ajax, a football club from Amsterdam, that was aired on TV channel RTV Noord Holland from 2004 until 2007. During the show the creators Maarten Bax and Onno Vos would interview the players and coaches about the coming or preceding matches, as well as air footage from the games and from the club's training grounds Sportpark De Toekomst, while summarizing the weekly news and events circulating around the club. The show aired every two hours after 17:30 CET on Fridays, and every hour after 9:30 CET on Saturdays from 2004 until 2007. No longer aired on national television since 2007 however, Ajaxjournaal is still broadcast online, and is also made available for viewing on screens all around the Amsterdam Metropolitan area, from McDonald's restaurants to screens on board trains of the Amsterdam Tramway Network, as well as the Amsterdam Metro transit system.

With the network RTV N-H focusing on events circulating around the North Holland province, the football club AZ from nearby Alkmaar also shared a weekly news magazine on the same network by the name of AZ Journaal which ran parallel to the show for the club from Amsterdam.
