= Guy Lynn =

British investigative journalist

- Born: London, England
- Education: Haberdashers' Aske's Boys' School; St Anne's College, Oxford University
- Occupations: Investigative journalist, reporter, producer, correspondent
- Years active: 2000s–present
- Employer: BBC
- Known for: High-impact investigations, including undercover work, across BBC TV, radio, and online
- Notable credit(s): BBC News Channel; BBC London News; BBC World News; BBC Weekend News; BBC Breakfast; Five Live; BBC Radio 4 One O’Clock News; Six O’Clock News; Newsnight; Today programme BBC Online

Guy Lynn is a British investigative journalist for the BBC, serving as the corporation’s sole dedicated investigative reporter for London. His stories have appeared across television, radio, and digital platforms, including the One and Six O’Clock News, Newsnight, the Today programme, BBC Breakfast, and BBC Online. In 2025, he won the Nations and Regions Reporter of the Year prize at the UK's national Royal Television Society TV Journalism Awards.

== Biography ==
Lynn was born in London, educated at Haberdashers' Aske's Boys' School in Elstree, and studied Geography at Oxford University.

He began his broadcasting career at BBC local radio before working for Channel One TV (London), Reuters Television, BBC South, and ITV West.

He has regularly appeared on other BBC One programmes such as Rip Off Britain and Morning Live, and also trains BBC journalists in investigative and covert filming techniques.

He previously worked as a rural affairs and environment correspondent for both network BBC news and BBC Look North.

He was a contributing author to the book Investigative Journalism: Dead or Alive (Abramis, 2011), a volume examining the state and future of accountability journalism.

== Notable investigations ==
Lynn has reported and produced dozens of high-impact investigations exposing fraud, corruption, criminality, discrimination, human rights abuses, regulatory failure and the abuse of power

These include:

The exposure of major safety flaws and failures by leading pub chains in the national flagship “Ask for Angela” pub safety scheme for women in distress prompted national reform.

A BBC investigation into a COVID fraudster styling himself as a bishop selling fake vaccine exemption kits to NHS and care workers who was convicted of fraud following Lynn’s undercover reporting.

A report on fraudulent minicab licensing in London which led Transport for London to suspend thousands of applications and reform its vetting system.

Gangs charging £2,000 to help candidates cheat the UK citizenship test using hidden earpieces were exposed in an undercover BBC investigation, prompting national scrutiny of testing security and attempts to obtain fake passports.

An exposé on the illegal sale of prescription-only medicines by UK pharmacists which triggered the UK’s largest disciplinary crackdown in the sector to date.

An investigation revealing how estate agents in London were blocking Black people from viewing properties, prompting widespread media coverage, political calls for an inquiry, public protests, and winning both the BBC Ruby and CIRCOM investigative journalism awards.

In 2013, Lynn's BBC report on the underground trade in illegal driving licences led to the UK's Department of Transport announcing a change in the law.

Ukraine suspended their top Olympic official, secretary general Volodymr Gerashchenko after Lynn's undercover investigation caught him attempting to illegally sell scores of tickets for the London Olympic Games on the black market

A 2009 exposé on discrimination against migrant workers in Boston, Lincolnshire led to an Amnesty International Media Award and prompted action by the Equality and Human Rights Commission. Amnesty described the investigation as “shocking and emblematic of a deeper malaise in UK society,” noting it made “waves from Poland to China.”

Lynn’s undercover report on fake veterinarian Leonard French, who controlled much of the UK’s black market in animal medicine, led directly to French’s conviction and imprisonment for 12 months in 2007 at Lincoln Crown Court. French’s attempt to overturn the sentence was rejected by the Court of Appeal.

== Documentaries ==
Between 2000 and 2003, Lynn was based in the Middle East, covering the intifada and 9/11 attacks for ABC TV News. He wrote and directed the documentary series Ordinary People, broadcast on several international stations, and co-authored the five-part TV documentary series 100 Years of Terror for Set Productions.

== Awards ==
- Finalist – British Journalism Awards 2026: Local Journalism
- Nominee – Society of Editors Media Freedom Awards 2026: Investigation of the Year – Broadcast
- Winner – Prix CIRCOM 2026: Investigative Journalism
- Winner – RTS Royal Television Society National Television Journalism Awards 2025: Nations and Regions Reporter of the Year
- Nominee – Association for International Broadcasting AIB Awards 2025: Broadcast journalist of the year
- Highly commended – AIB Awards 2020: Best Short TV Documentary ("Cab Fraud")
- Highly commended – Prix CIRCOM 2017: Investigative Journalism
- Nominee – BBC Ruby Awards 2016: Best Exclusive Story
- Nominee – BBC Ruby Awards 2016: Programme of the Year
- Winner – BBC Ruby Awards 2014: Best Exclusive Story
- Winner – Prix CIRCOM 2014: Investigative Journalism Prize
- Winner – EDF Energy Media Awards 2014: Television Journalist of the Year
- Winner – Guild of Food Writers Awards 2014: Food Broadcast of the Year
- Highly commended – AIB Awards 2014: Best Short TV Documentary ("Racism in Housing")
- Nominee – Guild of Food Writers Awards 2014: Campaigning and Investigative Journalism
- Nominee – European Diversity Awards 2014: Journalist of the Year
- Nominee – Amnesty International Media Awards 2014: Best Nations and Regions Coverage
- Nominee – EDF London/South of England Media Awards 2014: Specialist Journalist of the Year
- Winner – Amnesty International Media Award 2010: Best Nations and Regions Coverage
- Winner – (regional) Royal Television Society Reporter of the Year: 2010
- Bronze – BBC Gillard Award 2008: Best Original Journalism
- Winner – (regional) Royal Television Society Reporter of the Year: 2007
- Bronze – BBC Ruby Award 2007: Best Exclusive
- Winner – (regional) Royal Television Society Reporter of the Year: 2006
- Bronze – BBC Ruby Award 2006: TV News Journalist of the Year
