= Slavery Monument (Rotterdam) =

2013 memorial in Rotterdam, Netherlands

Coordinates: 51°54′4.58″N 4°27′35.54″E

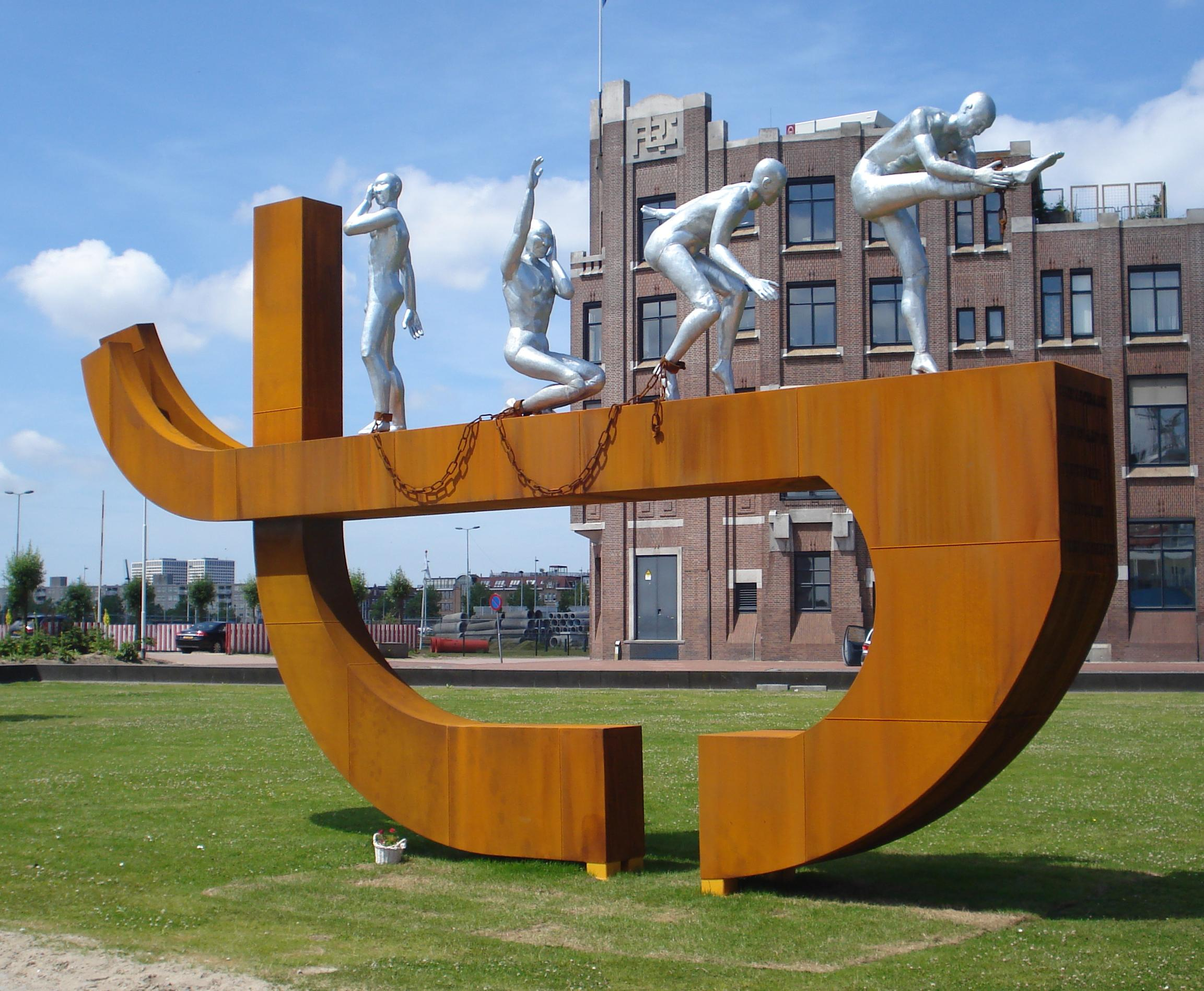
Slavery Monument

The Slavery Monument is a memorial commemorating the Dutch history of slavery, located in the city of Rotterdam, Netherlands. Named Clave: The body that is a slave leaves, the soul that is free remains the name inspired by the rhythms of Afro-Cuban music and the lyrics of a Cape Verdean folk song, the monument was designed by the painter and sculptor Alex da Silva (b. Luanda, Angola, 1974 – d. Cape Verde, 2019) and is situated on Lloydkade in the Lloyd Quarter of the Delfshaven district. The steel monument was unveiled on June 16 2013.

== History ==
From the 17th to the 19th century, weapons, pottery, and spirits were traded in the Lloyd Quarter. These goods were shipped to Africa, where they were exchanged for slaves. The Rotterdam ships then transported these slaves to Suriname and the Dutch Antilles, where they were traded for goods such as coffee and sugar, which were then shipped back to Rotterdam. In this Transatlantic slave trade, companies like Coopstad en Rochussen played a role, being the largest trading company in the Netherlands after the Middelburgsche Commercie Compagnie.

As of 2013, more than 80,000 descendants of enslaved people live in Rotterdam.

The Slavery Monument was unveiled on June 16, 2013. On July 1, 2015, it was exactly 150 years since slavery was abolished in the Netherlands. The nearby STC-Group college has adopted the monument.

== Design ==
The monument is made of corten steel and thermally galvanized steel, measuring 900 centimeters in length, 450 centimeters in height, and 120 centimeters in width. The sculpture takes the form of a stylized ship, atop which figures dance towards their freedom. Of the four dancing figures, the first is still fully chained, while the last is completely free, dancing.

== See also ==
- History of Dutch slavery
