= Lloydkwartier =

Neighborhood in Rotterdam, Netherlands

Coordinates: 51°54′06″N 4°27′32″E

Lloydkwartier English: Lloyd Quarter
- Neighborhood of Rotterdam
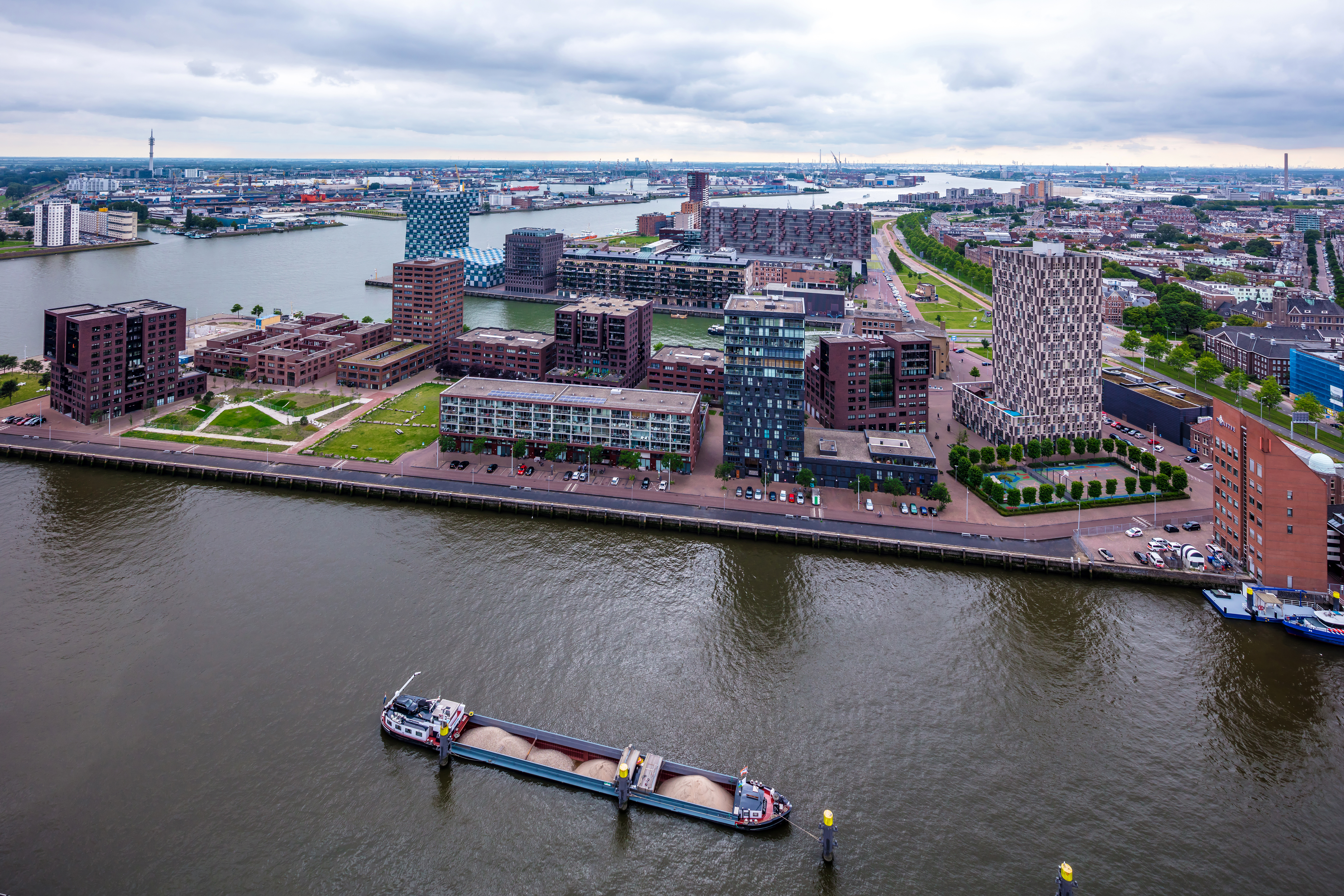
- Parkhaven, Müllerpier, Sint-Jobshaven, Lloydpier and Schiehaven in the back
- Interactive map of Lloydkwartier
- Country: Netherlands
- Province: South Holland
- COROP: Rijnmond
- City: Rotterdam
- Borough: Delfshaven
- Time zone: UTC+1 (CET)

Lloydkwartier (English: Lloyd Quarter) is a neighborhood of Rotterdam, Netherlands, located near the city centre. It is associated with creative industries, and has a distinctive visual style.

The neighborhood is located along the River Meuse, and contains the former Lloyd Yard docks, which have been converted into residential buildings. Generally, since the 2010s, Lloydkwartier has been shifting from its former purpose as a port to a residential neighborhood. As of 2021, the first wooden building in the Netherlands to reach 50 metres (160 ft) in height has been planned for this neighborhood, though it has not yet been constructed.

Reflecting its role as a port involved in the transatlantic slave trade, the Slavernijmonument, a monument commemorating the 150th anniversary of the abolition of slavery within the Netherlands was unveiled in the Lloydkwartier.

Lloydkwartier is located outside of the main dikes in Rotterdam, and thus is at increased risk of flooding, especially due to climate change. However, the neighborhood can be protected by the storm surge barriers Maeslantkering and Hartelkering if there is sufficient warning of rising water levels.
