= Scheveningen dialect =

Dutch dialect of The Hague

- Schevenings
- Pronunciation: [ˈsχeɪ̯vənɪŋs]
- Native to: Netherlands
- Region: The Hague
- Language family: Germanic: West Germanic; Istvaeonic; Low Franconian; Dutch; Hollandic; South Hollandic; Scheveningen dialect

Language codes
- ISO 639-3: –
- Glottolog: None

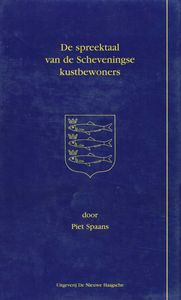
The latest (2004) edition of the Scheveningen dialect dictionary

Scheveningen dialect is a dialect of Dutch spoken in the Scheveningen district of The Hague.
