= CIRCOM =

CIRCOM (French: Cooperative Internationale de Recherche et d’Action en matière de Communication, English: International Cooperative for Research and Action on the Field of Communication) is a professional association of regional public service television stations in Europe.

Since 1990, the organisation awards the Prix CIRCOM Regional Programme Award at the CIRCOM Regional Annual Conference.

== Member stations ==
Member stations
Country	Station
Albania	RTSH
Austria	ORF
Belgium	RTBF
Bosnia and Herzegovina	BHRT
Bulgaria	BNT
Croatia	HRT
Czech Republic	ČT
Denmark	TV2
Finland	YLE
France	France Télévisions
Georgia	GPB
Germany	HR, RBB
Greece	ERT3, TV 100, Attica TV
Hungary	MTV
Ireland	RTÉ
Italy	RAI
Kosovo	RTK
Malta	PBS
Montenegro	RTCG
Netherlands	RPO
North Macedonia	MKRTV
Norway	NRK
Poland	TVP
Portugal	RTP
Romania	TVR
Serbia	RTS, RTV
Slovakia	RTVS
Slovenia	RTV SLO
Spain	CRTVG, EPRTVIB, RTVA, EITB, RTVCYL, CCMA, RTRM, CARTV
Sweden	SVT, UR
Switzerland	TSI
United Kingdom	BBC
