= RTV Rijnmond =

Rijnmond
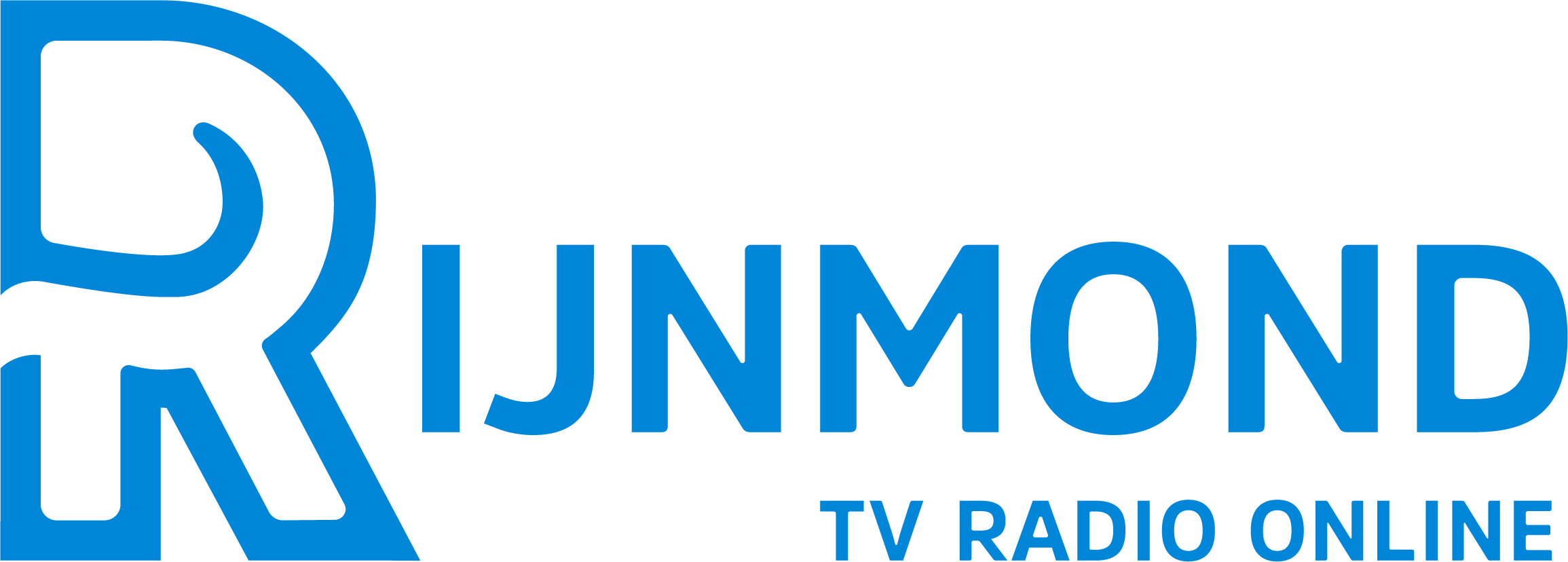
- Formerly: RTV Rijnmond
- Type: Public broadcaster
- Industry: Mass media
- Founded: December 21, 1983; 42 years ago
- Headquarters: Lloydstraat 23, Rotterdam, Netherlands
- Area served: Rijnmond, South Holland
- Key people: Sander Fransen
- Website: rijnmond.nl

Rijmond, also known by its original name Radio + TV Rijnmond (abbreviated RTV Rijnmond), is a regional public broadcaster in the Netherlands, specifically serving the Rijnmond region and the southern parts of the province of South Holland.

== Organization ==
=== Headguarters ===
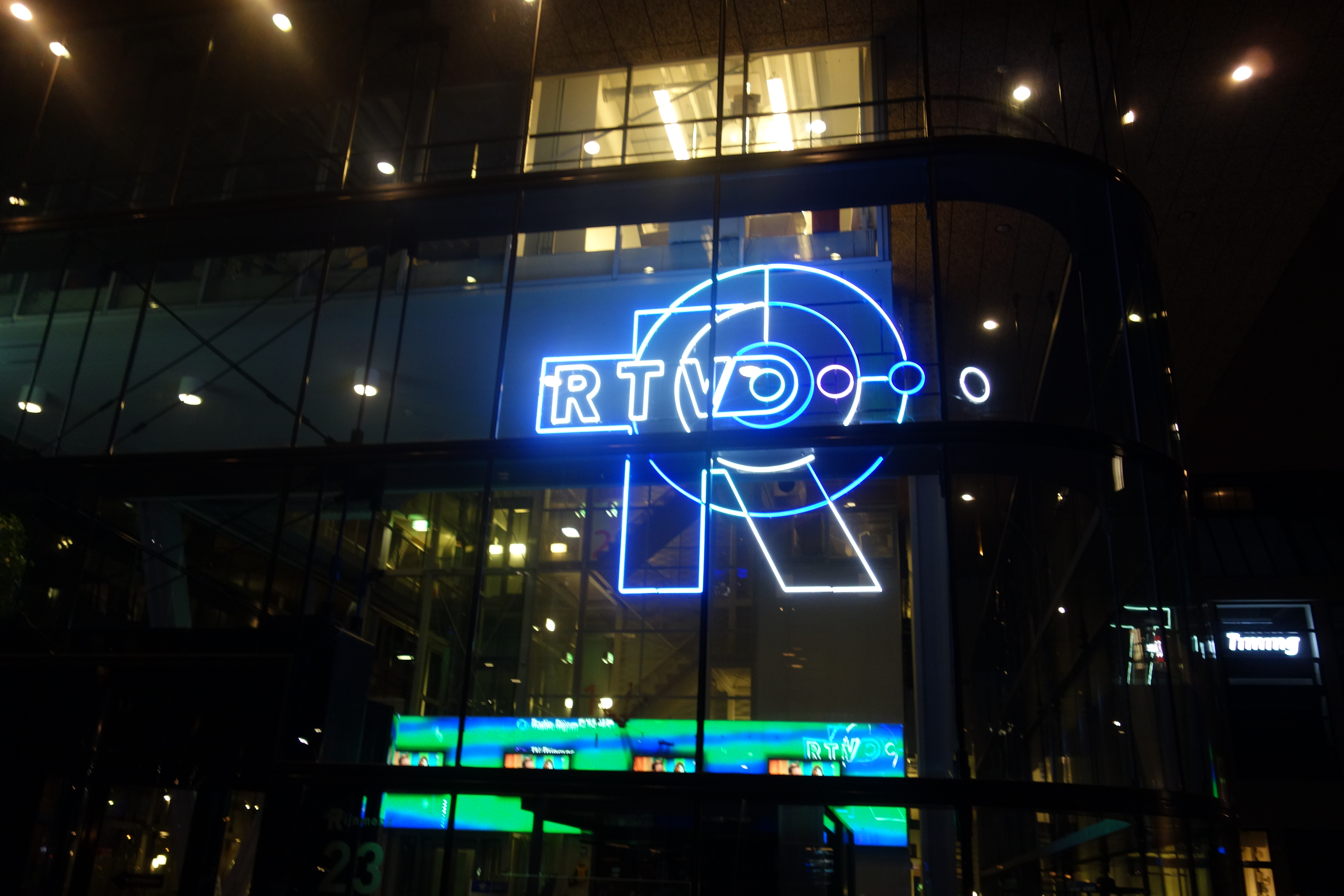
Rijnmond building in Rotterdam

Rijnmond is located in Lloydkwartier in Rotterdam, where both its radio and television broadcasts originate from. Since December 2, 2024, the broadcaster has had a new radio studio that allows broadcasts to be transmitted on television as well. It was one of the last regional public broadcasters to switch to 'visual radio'. In mid-April 2026, a new television studio was also put into use, for FC Rijnmond and In gesprek met, among others.

=== Financing ===
Since January 1, 2000, Rijnmond has been the regional public media organization within the meaning of the Mediawet 2008 in the southwestern part of the province of South Holland. As a result, the broadcaster is funded by the provincial government. The government contribution for the institution is determined annually by the Media Authority.

Rijnmond may also use airtime on radio and television for advertising. The revenue from this may be used exclusively for the fulfillment of the public media mandate. "Serving the generation of profit by third parties" is therefore not permitted by the regional public media institution under the Media Act 2008 (Article 2.141, paragraph 1).

== Logos ==
As of September 2, 2019, the broadcaster has a new look, saying goodbye to the name RTV Rijnmond.

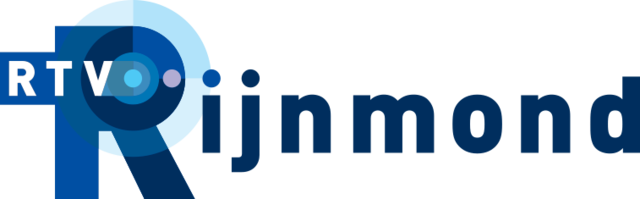
Used from August 31, 2004 to September 1, 2019

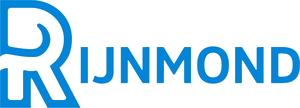
Used since September 2, 2019

== Radio ==
Radio Rijnmond
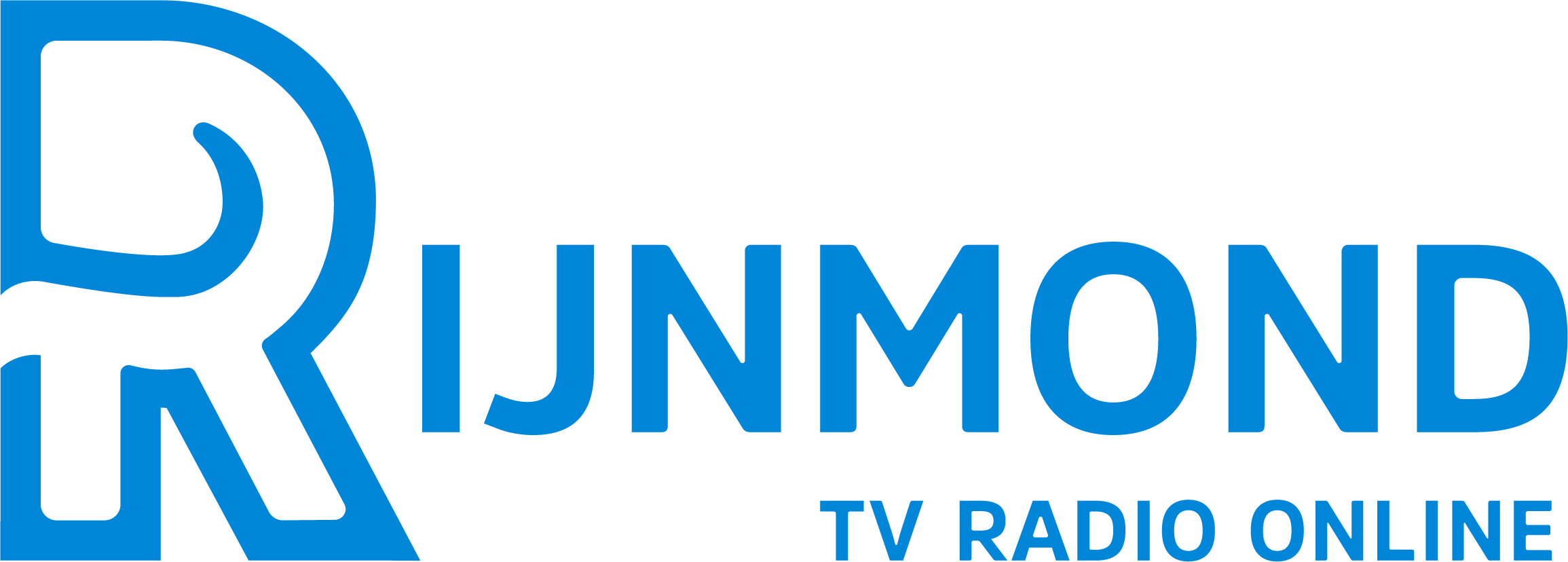
- Rotterdam; Netherlands
- Broadcast area: South Holland
- Frequencies: FM Broadcasting; 93.4 MHz; DAB+ 5B; Digital terrestrial broadcasting Digitenne: Channel 117; Cable television Ziggo: Channel 829; IPTV; KPN: Channel 890

Programming
- Language: Dutch
- Format: Variety/Regional Talk radio

Ownership
- Owner: Rijnmond

History
- First air date: December 21, 1983; 42 years ago

Links
- Webcast: Listen live
- Website: rijnmond.nl

Although the transmission equipment had been tested since November 1983, Radio Rijnmond officially started broadcasting on December 21, 1983. From that moment on, the station is formally operated by the Stichting Regionale Omroep Rotterdam-Rijnmond. At the time, the station was the only regional radio station in the Netherlands to produce entirely its own news broadcasts, whereas the regional broadcasters existing at the time adopted the national ANP news reports from the then Hilversum 1 or Hilversum 3.

=== Reception ===
Radio Rijnmond's broadcast frequency has been 93.4 MHz FM continuously since 1983 and can be listened to 24 hours a day. The transmitter site is located in the Waalhaven in Rotterdam. However, at some point, KPN Broadcast Services placed the transmitting antenna on the mast higher up on the ground. Additionally, the station can currently be received via DAB+, DVB-T, and local cable networks (partly DVB-C), both within and outside the formal catchment area.

=== Emergencies ===
Radio Rijnmond is the region's emergency broadcaster. This means that government authorities can claim airtime in the public interest when a disaster occurs in the region, in order to provide residents with information and instructions. This could, for example, be the advice to close windows and doors and to continue listening to Radio Rijnmond. In addition, in such a case, the editorial staff continues to provide independent information, even if this is not to the liking of political leaders or the police.

=== Programming ===
The station has a horizontal programming schedule. Among others, Peter van Drunen, Ronald van Oudheusden, Ruud de Boer, Erik Lemmers, Reint-Jan Potze, Bart Nolles and Dennis Kranenburg can be heard on the station with their own program or during Radio Rijnmond Sport.

Well-known (former) presenters of Radio Rijnmond include Hans van Vliet, Ghislaine Plag, Koos Postema, Suzanne Mulder, Roland Vonk and Johan Derksen.

== Television ==
TV Rijnmond
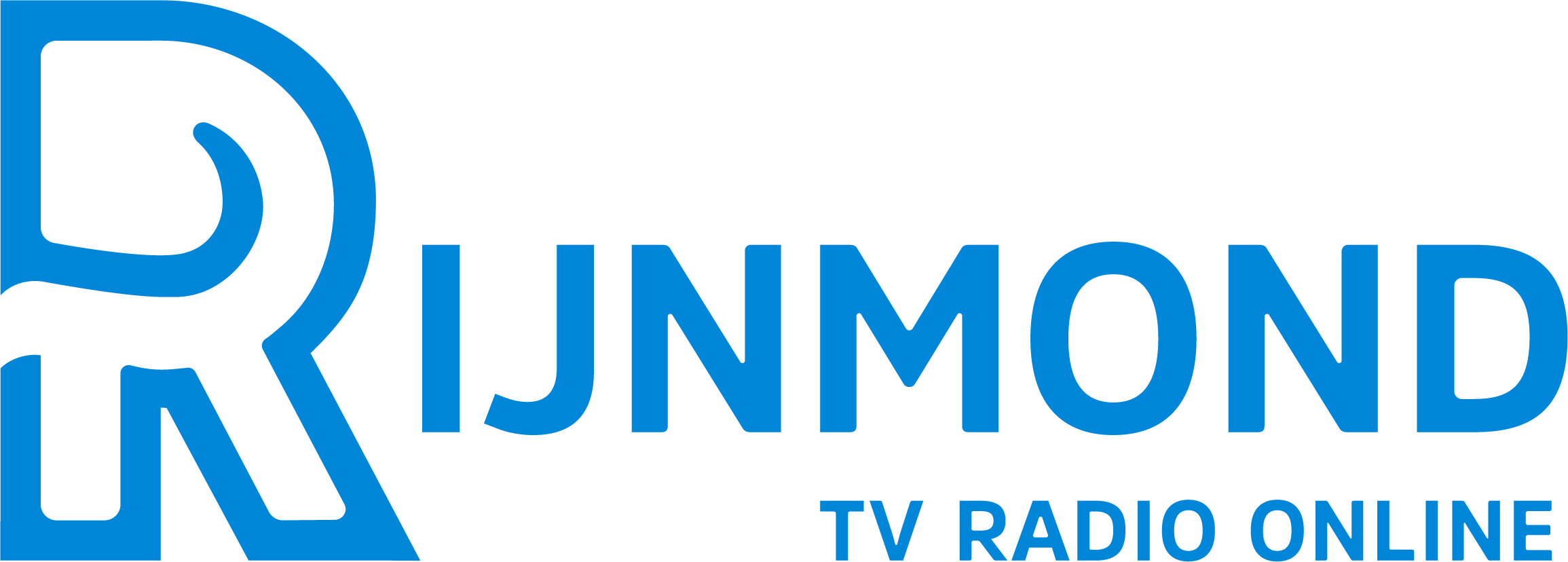
- Country: Netherlands
- Broadcast area: South Holland, Netherlands
- Network: Rijnmond
- Headquarters: Rotterdam, Netherlands

Programming
- Language: Dutch
- Picture format: 1080i HDTV (downscaled to 16:9 576i for the SDTV feed)

Ownership
- Owner: Rijnmond

History
- Launched: 1989; 37 years ago
- Former names: Stads TV Rotterdam

Links
- Website: rijnmond.nl

Availability

Terrestrial
- Digitenne: Channel 23 (HD, South Holland only)

Streaming media
- Rijnmond.nl: Watch live
- Ziggo GO: ZiggoGO.tv (Europe only)

TV Rijnmond originated from Stads TV Rotterdam, which was launched in 1989. This channel merged into the Rijnmond public-private organization in 1997. This means that TV Rijnmond held a public broadcasting license and private companies provided the financial resources. In 2000, TV Rijnmond became a fully public channel.

=== Programming ===
As of December 2024, TV Rijnmond broadcasts Radio Rijnmond programs during the day. Television programs can be seen from 17:00. Some of these programs include Rijnmond Vandaag, Bureau Rijnmond, FC Rijnmond and NOS Journaal in Makkelijke Taal.

Rijnmond Vandaag is the television channel's current affairs program. On weekdays, the program is presented by Tahmina Akefi or Jan-Roelof Visscher, among others. A weekly overview is shown on the weekend.

Bureau Rijnmond is a weekly crime investigation program in which surveillance footage and reconstructions of crimes are shown. FC Rijnmond discusses the developments and performance of the football clubs in the region. The program is usually presented by Bart Nolles. Recurring guests are Geert den Ouden, Harry van der Laan and Radio Rijnmond commentators Dennis van Eersel and Dennis Kranenburg.

Rijnmond also broadcasts around major regional events, including the World Port Days, the Rotterdam Marathon, the Rotterdam Summer Carnival and the Roparun.

Well-known (former) presenters of TV Rijnmond include Sander de Kramer, Ferry de Groot, Rob Geus, Marieke de Vries, Jeroen Snel, Rutger Castricum, Gert van 't Hof, Herman den Blijker, Sinclair Bischop and Philomena Bijlhout. Martin van Waardenberg and John Buijsman appeared in series produced for TV Rijnmond.

== Broadcast area ==
Rijnmond serves the southern subregions of South Holland, including the following municipalities:

1. Alblasserdam
2. Albrandswaard
3. Barendrecht
4. Binnenmaas
5. Capelle aan den IJssel
6. Dordrecht
7. Goeree-Overflakkee
8. Gorinchem
9. Hardinxveld-Giessendam
10. Hendrik-Ido-Ambacht
11. Hoeksche Waard
12. Krimpen aan den IJssel
13. Lansingerland
14. Maassluis
15. Molenlanden
16. Nissewaard
17. Papendrecht
18. Ridderkerk
19. Rotterdam
20. Schiedam
21. Sliedrecht
22. Vlaardingen
23. Voorne aan Zee
24. Zuidplas

== Online ==
Rijnmond provides news for the residents of the region and other interested parties via its own website. It publishes regional news and weather reports here, but also offers visitors the option to add NOS reports to the overview. Traffic information is also shared. Additionally, visitors can listen to Radio Rijnmond live or watch TV Rijnmond. Television broadcasts can also be watched on demand.

== Social media ==
Rijnmond's social media play an important role in the dissemination of regional news and current affairs. Through platforms such as Instagram, TikTok, Facebook, X, Bluesky and YouTube, the broadcaster reaches a broad audience in the Rotterdam-Rijnmond region daily. The channels are used for sharing news items, videos and background stories. Additionally, social media functions as an interactive medium where viewers and listeners can respond to posts and participate in discussions.

== Podcasts ==
For several years, Rijnmond has also been publishing podcasts, primarily about the football clubs from the region. For example, it produces Sparta Naar Voren about Sparta Rotterdam and Feyenoord: De Verlenging about Feyenoord.

== You'll Never Walk Alone Award ==
Lee Towers, officially Leen Huijzer, received the first You'll Never Walk Alone Award on March 23, 2026. From that point on, this new award will be presented annually by Rijnmond on Huijzer's birthday to a local resident who makes a special contribution to society.

Winners of the You'll Never Walk Alone Award
| Year | Name | Role | Note(s) |
|---|---|---|---|
| 2026 | Lee Towers | Singer | Namesake of the trophy |

== Collaboration partners ==
Rijnmond collaborates with various regional and national partners in its news provision. These partners include NOS, POINTER, and LINQ Media, among others. In addition, Rijnmond maintains contacts with regional broadcasters such as Omroep West, OPEN Rotterdam, RTV Lansingerland and Stichting WOS. Collaborations with RTV Dordrecht, Omroep Twee and Omroep Archipel are also part of the network. These partnerships ensure a broader and richer range of news and journalistic productions.
