= Jan Müller (executive) =

Dutch media proprietor (born 1967)

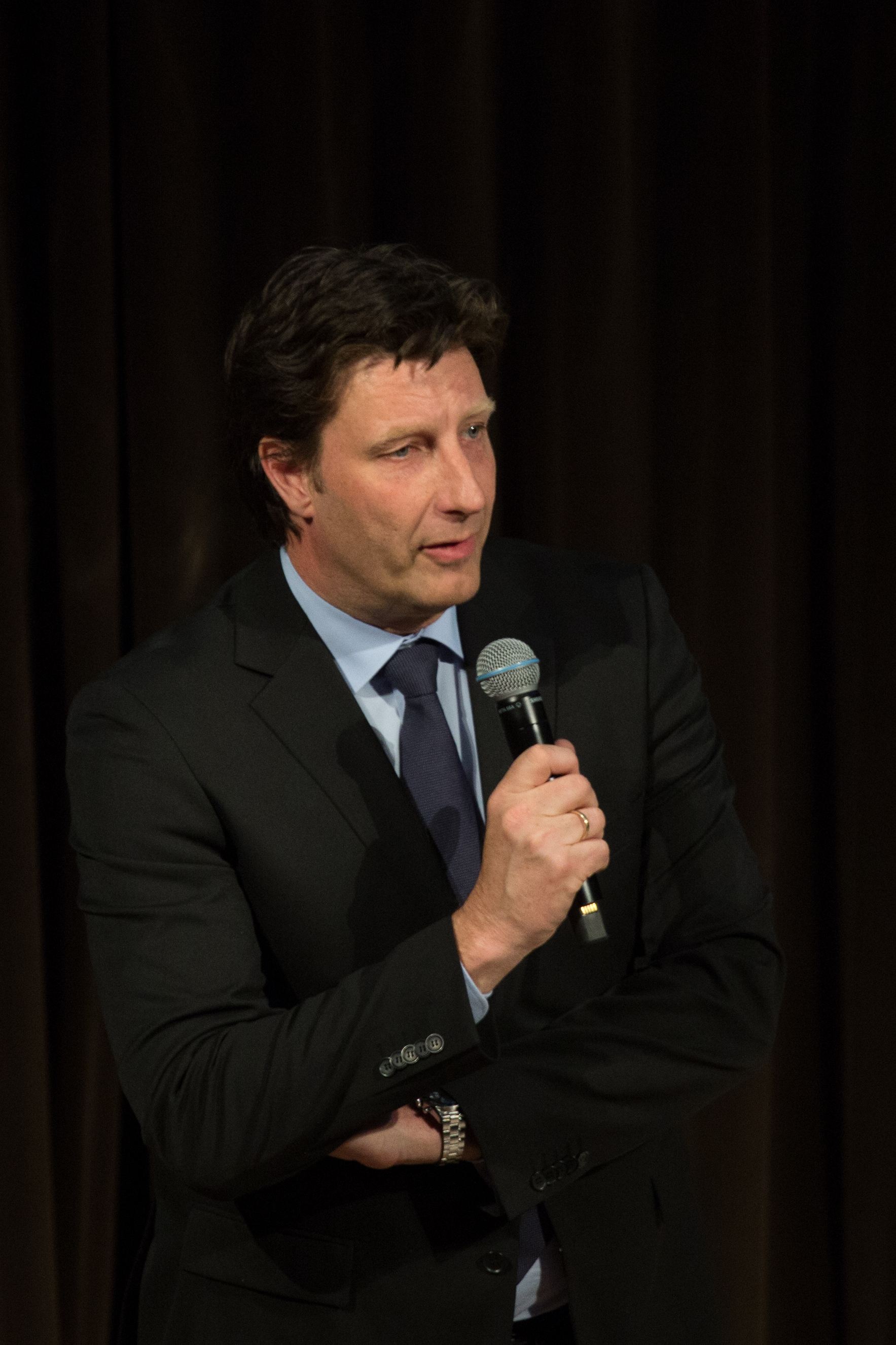
Müller in 2015

Jan Müller (born 1967) is a media archive executive and former advertising executive.

== Early life and education ==
Jan Müller was born in 1967 in Soest, Netherlands, as the son of the chief sound technician at the Nederlandse Omroep Stichting (National Broadcasting Foundation). At age four, Müller and his family moved to the town of Huizen in the Dutch province North Holland, where he grew up and completed primary and secondary education.

After graduating the atheneum, he studied commercial economics at the Hogeschool voor Economische Studies (University of Applied Sciences for Economics) in Amsterdam.

== Career ==
After graduation, Müller started a career in the advertising business. Eventually he became general director at the Dutch branch of Saatchi & Saatchi in 2003.

He was from 2006 until 2010 board member of the Stichting Ideële Reclame SIRE (Foundation for Idealistic Advertising), a national foundation that runs advertising campaigns in the public interest.

In 2009 Müller successfully applied, without direct professional experience in the heritage or broadcasting sector, for the position of general director of the Netherlands Institute for Sound and Vision, the multimedia archive and museum of the national broadcasters. As director, he was responsible for the digitization efforts of the archive, a reorganization after significant budget cuts and the 2017 merger with the Dutch Press Museum. He is credited to have played an essential role in growing the archive into a world player in media culture.

Müller was one of the co-founders of the Media Memory Foundation in 2010, aiming to create a new archive for oral history. Between 2011 and 2013, he was chairman of the Dutch Advertising Archive and Museum, ReclameArsenaal, between 2013 and 2016 supervisory board member of the Press Museum (which would shortly thereafter merge with Sound and Vision) and from 2010 to 2012 executive council member and from 2012 to 2016 president at the International Federation of Television Archives. From 2015 he was board member of the Europeana Foundation and from 2016 until he moved to Australia in 2017, he was chairman.

In 2017, Müller was appointed as chief executive director of the National Film and Sound Archive with a mission to help it digitize and to establish a national centre of excellence. He served in the position from October 2017 until the end of 2020, when he returned to the Netherlands during the COVID-19 pandemic. During the term of this appointment, in 2018 he joined the advisory board of the Centre for Media History at Macquarie University.
