= Buma Cultuur =

Dutch nonprofit organization

The Buma Cultuur Foundation (formerly known as the Foundation Conamus) is a non-profit organization that supports and promotes Dutch music. Conamus was founded in 1962 by John de Mol Sr., and changed its name to Buma Cultuur on 1 March 2006.

== Objective ==
The foundation's objective is to promote Dutch music in the Netherlands and abroad. The organization promotes Dutch music projects that benefit and are supported by the Dutch collecting society Buma, and also organizes annual events including the Amsterdam Dance Event, the Noorderslag Festival, the Day of Dutch Jazz and Musiciansday. They also participate in international music conferences to promote and stimulate the export of Dutch music.

Jerney Kaagman was the director of the foundation until 1 March 2009. Frank Helmink replaced her from 4 May 2009.

The foundation also annually reports on the export value of Dutch music.

== Prizes ==
Buma Cultuur presents a number of awards to artists deemed to have contributed to the furthering of Dutch music, often in collaboration with partners.

Every year in February during the Harpengala, the Golden Harp, Silver Harp and Buma Culture Export awards are presented. The Golden Harp is a lifetime achievement award for an artist who has made a significant contribution to Dutch music. The Silver Harp is an incentive prize for emerging artists. The Export Prize is an award for the most internationally successful Dutch artist. In the years 2003, 2004, 2005 and 2006 the export prize was presented to Within Temptation. In 2007 DJ Tiësto won this award, and in 2008 it was presented to Giorgio Tuinfort along with André Rieu, who won the prize again in 2009.

- During the Gala of the Dutch Song, and in collaboration with Radio 2, the Radio 2 Airtime award was awarded to artists who had been played over a long period on Radio 2 and had thus made a profound and lasting impact on Dutch music.
- During the annual Noorderslag Festival, the Popprize is awarded to the group or artist who has made the largest contribution to Dutch pop music in the last year.
- Since 1991 the Annie M.G. Schmidt-prize is awarded for the best cabaret song.
- The Buma Toonzetters Dutch Award is given to the best new composition from the previous year.
- The Perform Sena Overseers POPnl Award goes to young talented pop artists from each province.
- The William Wilmot Prize is awarded to the best children's song.
