= Rijnmond =

Region of the Netherlands

Coordinates: 51.8950°N 4.3791°E

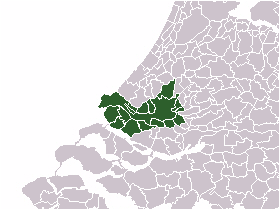
Location of Rijnmond, with the municipality of Rotterdam and the other municipalities in green

Rijnmond (Dutch pronunciation: [ˈrɛimɔnt]; literally 'Rhine Mouth', 'Mouth of the Rhine', 'Rhine Estuary') is the conurbation surrounding the city of Rotterdam in the Netherlands. Another term used in this context is Stadsregio Rotterdam (literally 'Rotterdam Urban Region' or more conventionally 'Greater Rotterdam Area'). Located on the Rhine–Meuse–Scheldt delta, the region has a combined population of 1,181,289 as of 2021.

The term Rijnmond is used in the security region Rotterdam-Rijnmond, it consists of the following municipalities: Albrandswaard, Barendrecht, Brielle, Capelle aan den IJssel, Goeree-Overflakkee, Hellevoetsluis, Krimpen aan den IJssel, Lansingerland, Maassluis, Nissewaard, Ridderkerk, Rotterdam, Schiedam, Vlaardingen and Westvoorne.

== Number of inhabitants per municipality ==
Municipality	Inhabitants (2016)
Rotterdam	588,490
Nissewaard	85,440
Schiedam	79,279
Vlaardingen	73,924
Capelle aan den IJssel	31,841
Lansingerland	64,731
Barendrecht	48,812
Ridderkerk	46,671
Hellevoetsluis	40,312
Maassluis	33,567
Krimpen aan den IJssel	29,410
Albrandswaard	26,357
Brielle	17,549
Westvoorne	14,900
Total	1,181,289

== See also ==
- Zuid-Holland Oost
- Zuid-Holland West
- Zuid-Holland Zuid
