= L1 (broadcaster) =

Dutch regional public broadcaster

- Country: Netherlands
- Founded: 1988 (Omroep Limburg); 1999 (L1)
- TV stations: L1 TV
- Radio stations: L1 Radio; L11 Alaaf Radio; Plat-eweg Radio
- Headquarters: Ambyerstraat Zuid 77b, Maastricht
- Broadcast area: Limburg
- Former names: Omroep Limburg
- Webcast: L1 TV; L1 Radio
- Official website: www.l1.nl
- Language: Dutch; Limburgish
- Replaced: Regionale Omroep Zuid

L1, also known by its original name Omroep Limburg (lit. 'Limburg Broadcasting'), is a regional public broadcaster in the Netherlands, specifically serving the province of Limburg. Founded in 1988 to replace the Regionale Omroep Zuid (ROZ), the station rebranded to L1 in 1999 following a merger with the commercial broadcaster TV8 Limburg.

== History ==
On 24 December 1945, the Regionale Omroep Zuid (ROZ) – the first regional radio station in the Netherlands – began its broadcasts in Limburg. The station operated under the umbrella of the Dutch Radio Union (NFU) and, from 1969, the Nederlandse Omroep Stichting (NOS). In 1988, the regional broadcasting services were detached from the NOS, following the implementation of the Media Act. The ROZ was then dissolved and replaced by the newly founded Omroep Limburg as Limburg's regional public broadcaster.

In 1997, the commercial regional television station TV8 Limburg was established. Later that year, Omroep Limburg also began broadcasting on television. Due to cable network limitations, the channels shared the same frequency: Omroep Limburg aired from 7:15 to 19:15, while TV8 Limburg took over during the evening and early morning hours. Because of the legal and practical challenges posed by the shared television frequency, the two broadcasters merged in June 1999 to form L1.

== Programmes ==
=== Television ===
- AvondGasten (talk show)
- L1 Nieuws (news)
- Limburg Doc (documentaries)
- Nachsjiech (culture)
- Óngerwaeg (human interest)
- Pitlane (sports news)
- Tafel Voetbal (sports news)
