= Omroep Zeeland =

Dutch regional television station

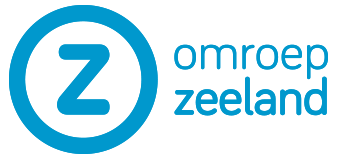
- Type: Public broadcaster
- Founded: July 13, 1988; 38 years ago
- Founder: Flip Feij (retired)
- Headquarters: Zeeland, Netherlands
- Key people: Monique Schoonen; Edwin de Kort; Edwin Laar (retired)
- Number of employees: 95 (in January 2020)
- Website: omroepzeeland.nl

Availability

Streaming media
- Zeeland Livestream: Watch Live; Listen Live
- Ziggo Go: ZiggoGO.tv
- Listen Live

Omroep Zeeland (lit. 'Zeeland Broadcasting') is a regional public broadcaster located in Zeeland, Netherlands. Founded in 1988, the media organization is active in television, radio and internet. The audience is on average slightly older than that of the other Dutch regional broadcasters.

== History ==
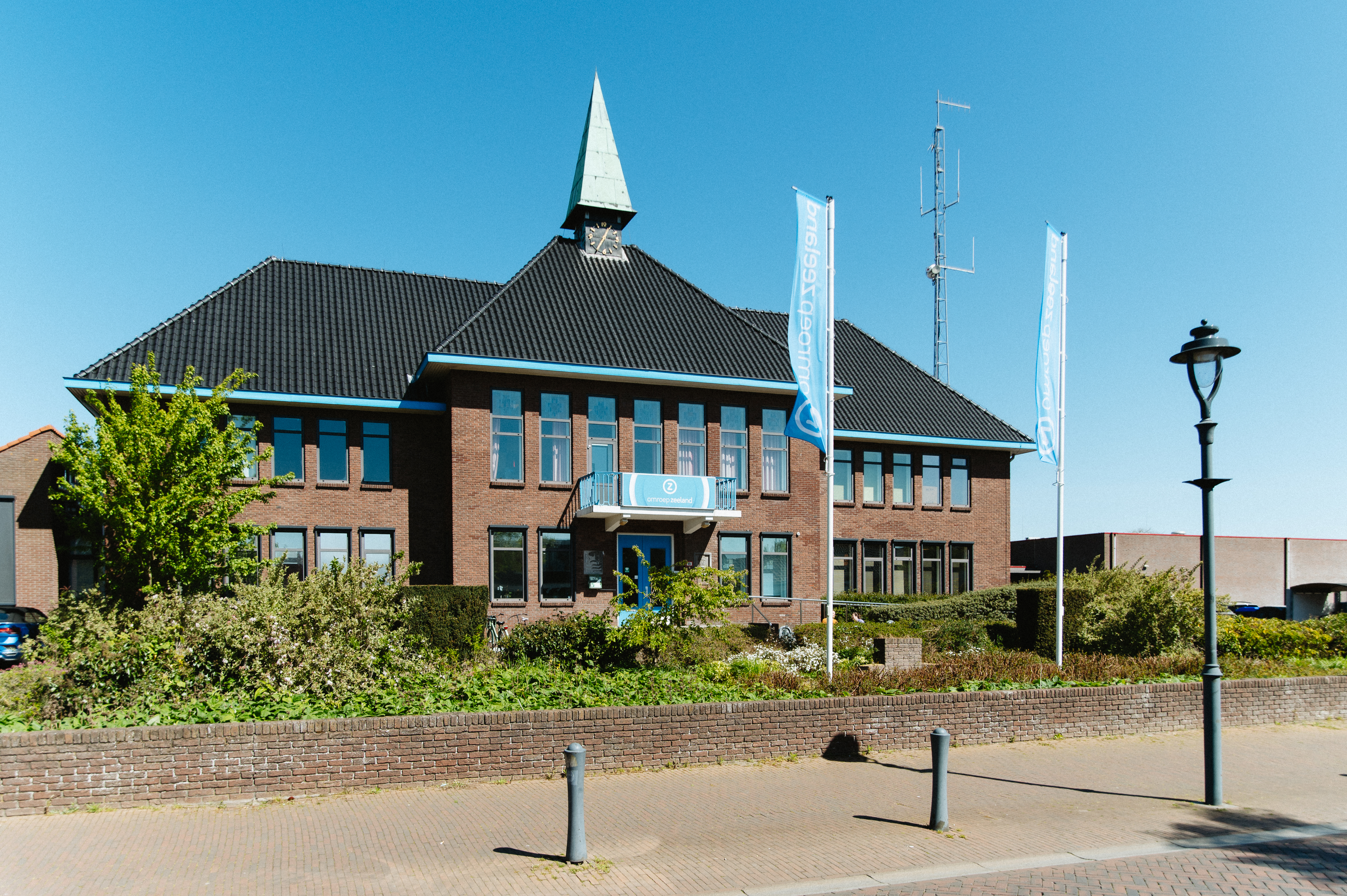
Studio and office building of Omroep Zeeland in Oost-Souburg

Omroep Zeeland was founded on 13 July 1988 after being in the pipeline since 1965. It launched its radio broadcasts on 1 January 1990. Its building, located in Oost-Souburg, served until 1996 as municipality seat of Oost- en West-Souburg. Omroep Zeeland launched its television broadcasts on 1 October 1997. In 2000, after it filmed riots by football supporters of the Dutch national team in Middelburg, Omroep Zeeland surrendered its film material under severe pressure to the Dutch police.

In 2007, Flip Feij retired as founding director and chief editor and was replaced by Monique Schoonen and Edwin Laar in his respective positions. A plan to move to Vlissingen's historic Timmerfabriek was dropped in 2012. In March 2012, the website of Omroep Zeeland was contaminated with a Trojan malware for about an hour and blocked by Google for about 12 hours. The virus was reported to be a variant of Zeus malware that may have entered through an advertiser. Over 2012, the average daily reach was 25% for its television broadcasts and 15% for its radio station. In 2013, it partnered with the Provinciale Zeeuwse Courant, especially in the domain of internet reporting.

Budget cuts in the 2010s largely affected the organization. Since 2016, Omroep Zeeland TV can be received in HD resolution via cable networks. In 2017, the Staatkundig Gereformeerde Partij was upset over Omroep Zeeland's annual report that contained, according to SGP, profanity in Zeelandic in its title. Also in 2017, Omroep Zeeland's TV channel was again found to be more popular than its radio channel. Exposure rate for the radio was 14%, just 1 point percent down since 2012. In 2019, Omroep Zeeland's satellite broadcast was ceased due to high costs. In the late 2010s, a drunken editor was fired after groping two female colleagues at an employee party.

In May 2024, it was announced that Omroep Zeeland would be moving after 35 years in Oost-Souburg. The broadcaster is moving to a new building on Prins Hendrikweg in Vlissingen, next to the Keersluisbrug. The plan is for this to happen in 2026. According to director Mike Ackermans, the move is necessary to be able to continue operating as a modern media company in the future.

== Notable personalities ==
- Carolyn Lilipaly, former TV news host
