= Omrop Fryslân =

Broadcaster in Friesland, Netherlands

- Country: Netherlands
- First air date: 1978 (Radio Fryslân)
- Founded: 1988
- TV stations: Omrop Fryslân TV
- Radio stations: Omrop Fryslân Radio
- Headquarters: Omrop Fryslân; Zuiderkruisweg 2 Postbus 7600; Leeuwarden
- Broadcast area: Friesland
- Former names: Radio Fryslân
- Picture format: 16:9 576i (SDTV)
- Radio frequency: FM 92.2 MHz
- Webcast: Omrop Fryslân TV (ZiggoGO.TV); Omrop Fryslân Radio
- Official website: www.omropfryslan.nl
- Language: West Frisian; Dutch
- Replaced: RONO (Regionale Omroep Noord en Oost)

Omrop Fryslân (lit. 'Friesland Broadcasting') is the regional public broadcaster for the Dutch province of Friesland.

It is also a broadcaster on the Netherlands Public Broadcasting (NPO) which serves the Frisian community. Because West Frisian is an official language of the Kingdom of the Netherlands, the NPO is responsible for broadcasts in the West Frisian language as well.

== History ==
The province of Friesland has had a regional broadcaster since 1946. In the early years, broadcasts were provided by Regionale Omroep Noord (RON). In the 1950s, RON was renamed RONO (Regionale Omroep Noord en Oost). RON (and later RONO) was the regional broadcaster for the provinces of Friesland, Groningen, Drenthe, Overijssel, and, from 1965, Gelderland as well. The Frisian branch of RON/RONO provided radio broadcasts for Friesland (partly in Frisian).

In 1978, RONO was split into three stations: Radio Noord, Radio Oost and Radio Friesland (in Frisian: Radio Fryslân). In 1988, Radio Fryslân became independent as Omrop Fryslân. In 1994, Omrop Fryslân began broadcasting one-hour television programs. A few years later, they began broadcasting a one-and-a-half-hour program, which was repeated throughout the night. Omrop Fryslân is also the emergency broadcaster, informing the Frisian population in the event of a disaster. The broadcaster also provides "Fryske skoalletelefyzje" (school television). The broadcaster is permitted to broadcast 52 hours of Fryslân DOK per year on public networks (NPO 2), in addition to 40 Frisian school television programs. Omrop Fryslân was the first regional broadcaster to air its own drama series, namely Baas Boppe Baas. This series was followed by the lawyer series Dankert en Dankert, based on the Frisian lawyer duo Wim and Hans Anker. In 2009, Steven de Jong created the series Bit for Omrop Fryslân, about horses.

== Known employees ==
Omrop Fryslân is considered an important breeding ground for regional journalism and West Frisian-language media in the Netherlands. Several employees later made the switch to national public broadcasters and programs on NPO 1.

Well-known examples of this are Afke Boven, who became a presenter for the NOS Journaal after her work at Omrop Fryslân, and Welmoed Sijtsma, who progressed through Omrop Fryslân to, among others, the NOS Jeugdjournaal and Goedemorgen Nederland. Lennard Jan Geerts also moved from Omrop Fryslân to WNL's Goedemorgen Nederland on NPO 1.

== Radio ==
Omrop Fryslân Radio can be received on analogue terrestrial radio on 92.2 MHz FM and 92.5 MHz FM. It is also available on cable (both analogue and digital), DAB+ (since 2015), Digitenne (DVB-T), via satellite position Astra 23.5°E and on the internet.

== Television ==
=== Regional ===
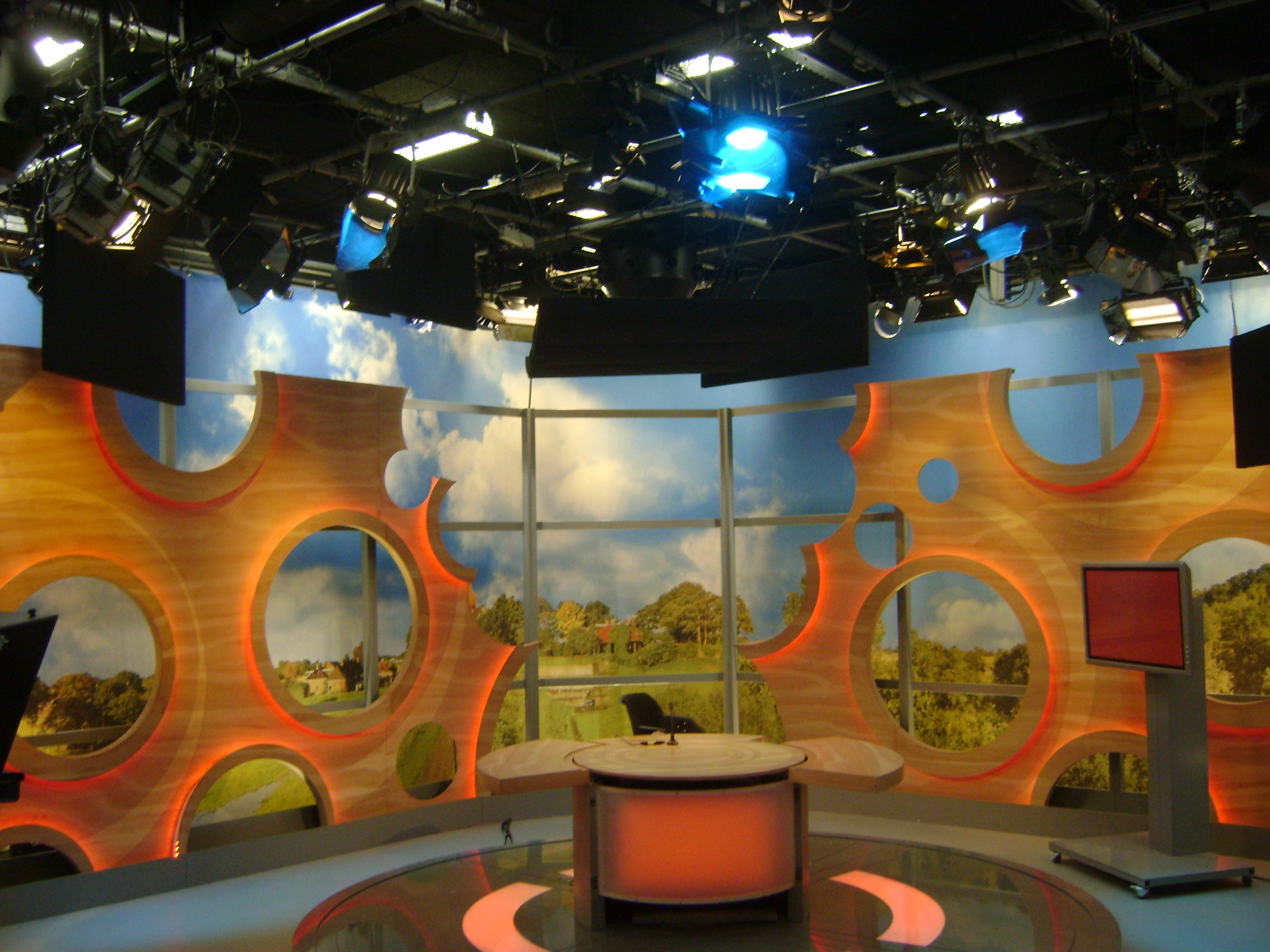
Omrop Fryslân television studio

Since 1994, Omrop Fryslân has had its own regional television channel. The regional news bulletin called Fryslân Hjoed (meaning Friesland Today) is broadcast daily at 18:00 and repeated every hour, with the last rebroadcast the next morning at 8:00.

Omrop Fryslân TV can be received free-to-air on DVB-T (Digitenne). It is also available on cable (both analogue and digital), satellite and the internet.

=== National ===
Due to West Frisian being an official language in the Netherlands, Omrop Fryslân also has airtime on national public television for 36 hours a year. Out of these 36 hours, 15 hours are assigned for school television in West Frisian. The rest of the airtime is mainly used for documentaries, which are broadcast on Saturday mornings and Sunday afternoons on NPO 2.
