= RTV Utrecht =

Dutch regional public broadcaster

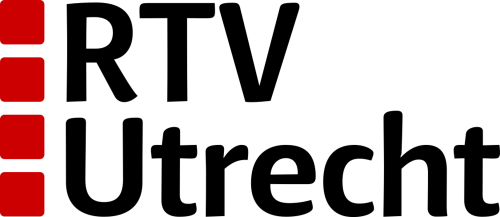
- Country: Netherlands
- First air date: 1989 (Radio M)
- Founded: 2002
- TV stations: RTV Utrecht; UStad
- Radio stations: Radio M Utrecht; Bingo FM
- Headquarters: Hengeveldstraat 29, Utrecht
- Broadcast area: Utrecht
- Picture format: 16:9 576i (SDTV)
- Webcast: RTV Utrecht; UStad; Radio M Utrecht; Bingo FM
- Official website: rtvutrecht.nl
- Replaced: Radio M; Omroep Utrecht

Radio Televisie Utrecht, abbreviated RTV Utrecht, is the regional public broadcaster for the Dutch province of Utrecht. It was founded in 2002, following the merger of Radio M and Omroep Utrecht.

Radio Utrecht began operations in 1989, and was renamed Radio M – short for Midden-Nederland (lit. 'Central Netherlands') – in 1996. The first television broadcast was in 2000. The station merged with Omroep Utrecht, the local broadcaster for the province's capital city Utrecht, in 2002.
