= Omroep Flevoland =

Dutch regional public broadcaster

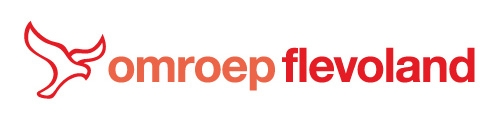
- Country: Netherlands
- Founded: April 1, 1989 (radio); October 1, 1997 (TV)
- TV stations: Omroep Flevoland TV
- Radio stations: Omroep Flevoland Radio
- Headquarters: Omroep Flevoland; Larserpoortweg 40; 8218 NK Lelystad
- Broadcast area: Flevoland
- Picture format: 16:9 576i (SDTV)
- Radio frequency: FM 89.8 MHz
- Official website: www.omroepflevoland.nl
- Language: Dutch

Omrop Flevoland (lit. 'Flevoland Broadcasting') is the regional public broadcaster for the Dutch province of Flevoland.

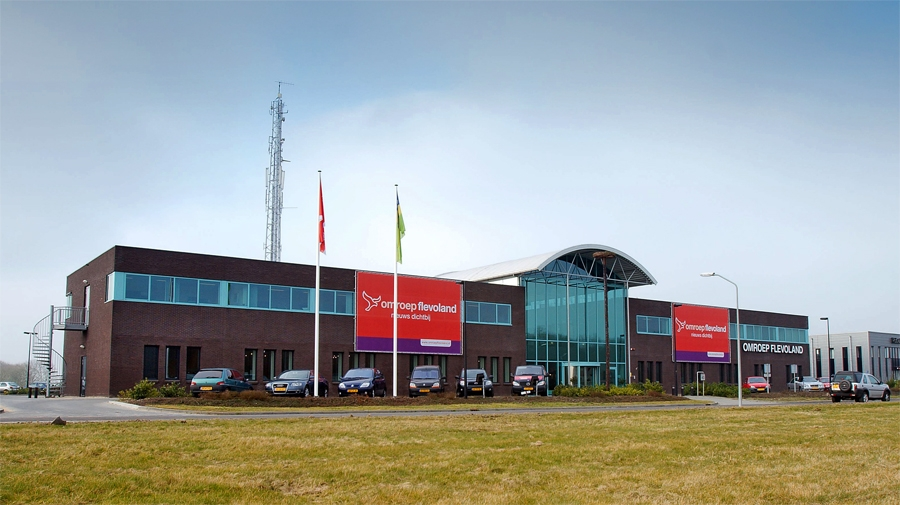
Omroep Flevoland building in Lelystad

On April 1, 1989, Omroep Flevoland started with regional radio from a building in the De Gordiaan shopping center in Lelystad. Gerard Hullegie had the honor of hosting the first broadcast. He was assisted from the location by Marc van Amstel and Inge Diepman.

TV Flevoland was launched on October 1, 1997. Jeroen van der Laan presented the first television broadcast. Initially, the radio division was based in Lelystad (Meentweg), while television was produced in Almere (Randstad). Since the end of 2003, the broadcaster has been located under one roof with all media at Larserpoortweg in Lelystad.

== Multimedia broadcaster ==
Omroep Flevoland distributes news and information from Flevoland via various media. The radio broadcasts can be listened to 24 hours a day. Omroep Flevoland TV offers a daily program. Visual radio is available during the day. In addition to radio and television, news items, weather, and traffic can be found on the website and the app. Furthermore, the broadcaster is active on social media: Facebook, Instagram, X, TikTok and YouTube.

== Flevoland Radio ==
Under the name Dit is Flevoland (meaning This Is Flevoland), the radio station offers extensive programming throughout the day featuring regional news, weather, traffic, interviews and reports, interspersed with music. The mascot is the cheerful hawk Kiek.

The station can be received on analogue terrestrial radio on 89.8 MHz FM. It is also available on cable (both analogue and digital), DAB+, Digitenne (DVB-T), the internet.

== Flevoland TV ==
Flevoland TV broadcasts Dit is Flevoland, a varied half-hour program focusing on the news and a comprehensive weather report for the province, every day. The programming is repeated in a carousel. From 17:00, there is a news bulletin every half hour. In addition, Omroep Flevoland offers the program Over Flevoland Gesproken, a political talk show, on weekends.

The channel can be received free-to-air on DVB-T (Digitenne). It is also available on cable (both analogue and digital) and the internet.
