= Omroep Brabant =

Dutch regional radio and television broadcaster

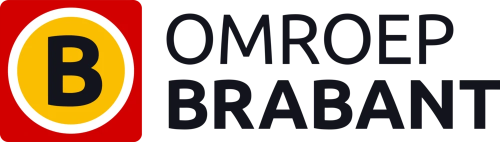
- Country: Netherlands
- Headquarters: Omroep Brabant; Science Park 5550; 5692 EL Son

Programming
- Language: Dutch
- Picture format: 16:9 576i (SDTV)

History
- Launched: September 1, 1976; 49 years ago

Links
- Website: omroepbrabant.nl

Availability

Streaming media
- Livestream TV: Watch Live
- Ziggo GO (Netherlands): ZiggoGO.tv

Omroep Brabant
- Son; Netherlands
- Broadcast area: North Brabant
- Frequencies: FM Broadcasting; 87.6 MHz (Southeast Brabant); 91.0 MHz (West Brabant); 91.9 MHz (Central Brabant); 95.8 MHz (Northeast Brabant); DAB+ 7A (North Brabant and Limburg); 9A (Zeeland); Satellite broadcasting Astra 23.5°E: 12.187 GHz Horizontal; SR: 29900 FEC: 2/3; Digital terrestrial broadcasting Digitenne: Channel 507; Cable television Ziggo: Channel 30/712 (outside of Brabant); IPTV; KPN: Channel 886

Programming
- Language: Dutch
- Format: Variety/Regional Talk radio

History
- First air date: September 1, 1976; 49 years ago

Links
- Webcast: Webstream
- Website: omroepbrabant.nl

Omroep Brabant (lit. 'Brabant Broadcasting') is the regional public broadcaster for the Dutch province of North Brabant. Started boardcasting on September 1, 1976, it has its headquarters in Eindhoven as well as a building in Breda.

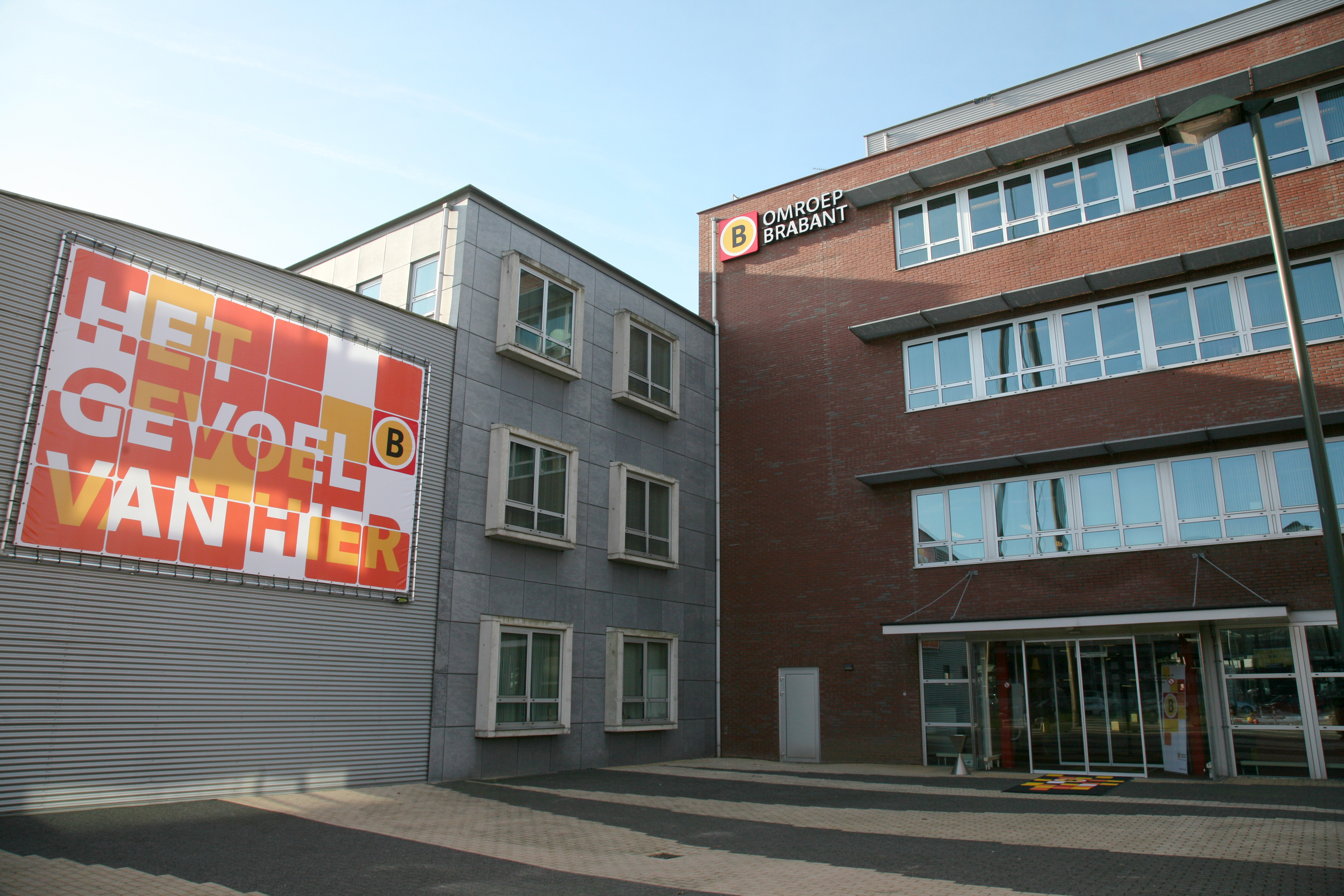
Omroep Brabant building in Son

Video: Een rondleiding bij de regie van Omroep Brabant [1:20]

== History ==
Omroep Brabant's first broadcast went on air on September 1, 1976. Initially, the broadcaster was meant to cover news in Eindhoven and around it.

In March 1989, Omroep Brabant started with an edition system in Breda, 's-Hertogenbosch and Tilburg. The studio in Tilburg has been sold off and the one in 's-Hertogenbosch has been moved to the Provinciehuis. The studio in Breda currently houses the West Brabant editorial team, which covers the area from Tilburg to the west. The radio division broadcasts 24 hours a day. There are programs on weekdays from 6:00 to 20:00 and on weekends from 9:00 to 18:00, with non-stop music playing in the intermediate hours. There are eight presenters.

Omroep Brabant started broadcasting on television in September 1997. The channel produces daily news broadcasts (7:00 and 17:30) and background programs from its studio in Son. Since February 2026, the news coverage has been reduced, and Omroep Brabant now only provides the evening news. Besides news, the channel has a number of regular programs aimed at the region.

On April 19, 2010, Omroep Brabant started the TV program Goeiemiddag Brabant. This program has since been discontinued. One of Omroep Brabant's most watched programs was the cultural-historical program De Wandeling, presented by René Bastiaanse, who went out with cameraman Léon Hagedoorn. The program attracted 400,000 viewers every week and ran from 1998 to 2005. Omroep Brabant's ratings hit is the annual official kick-off of Carnival, 3 Uurkes Vurraf. The program attracts more than a million viewers annually. "Fijnfisjenie!" is the phrase used by all (Omroep) Brabanders during the Carnival season. Since 2023, Omroep Brabant has been called Roeptoetgat during Carnival.

During the week, the programming focuses on current events in Brabant. In the Brabant Nieuws broadcasts, the broadcaster presents the news of the moment. The program Kraak provides more room for background information on the news and human interest.

Omroep Brabant publishes regional news on the internet. In addition to the website, there are mobile apps and the broadcaster is active on social media. Since 2011, Omroep Brabant has chosen to first publish all news online first and only then make it suitable for radio and television.

== Logos ==
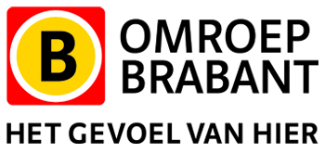
2012-2017

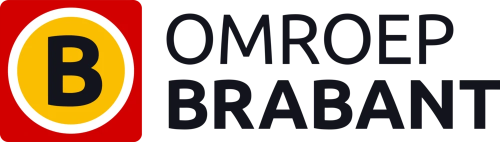
2017-present
