= RTV Noord =

Dutch regional radio and TV broadcaster

- Formerly: Radio Noord
- Type: Public broadcaster
- Industry: Mass media
- Founded: October 19, 1977; 48 years ago
- Headquarters: Groningen, Netherlands
- Area served: Groningen
- Owners: RTV Noord Radio and Televisie-Industriëles N.V.
- Number of employees: 93
- Website: rtvnoord.nl

Availability

Streaming media
- RTVNoord.nl: Watch live Listen live

Radio en Televisie Noord, abbreviated RTV Noord, is the regional public broadcaster for the Dutch province of Groningen. It broadcasts TV and radio programming 24 hours per day, seven days a week. Some content is broadcast in the Gronings dialect of Low Saxon.

== History ==
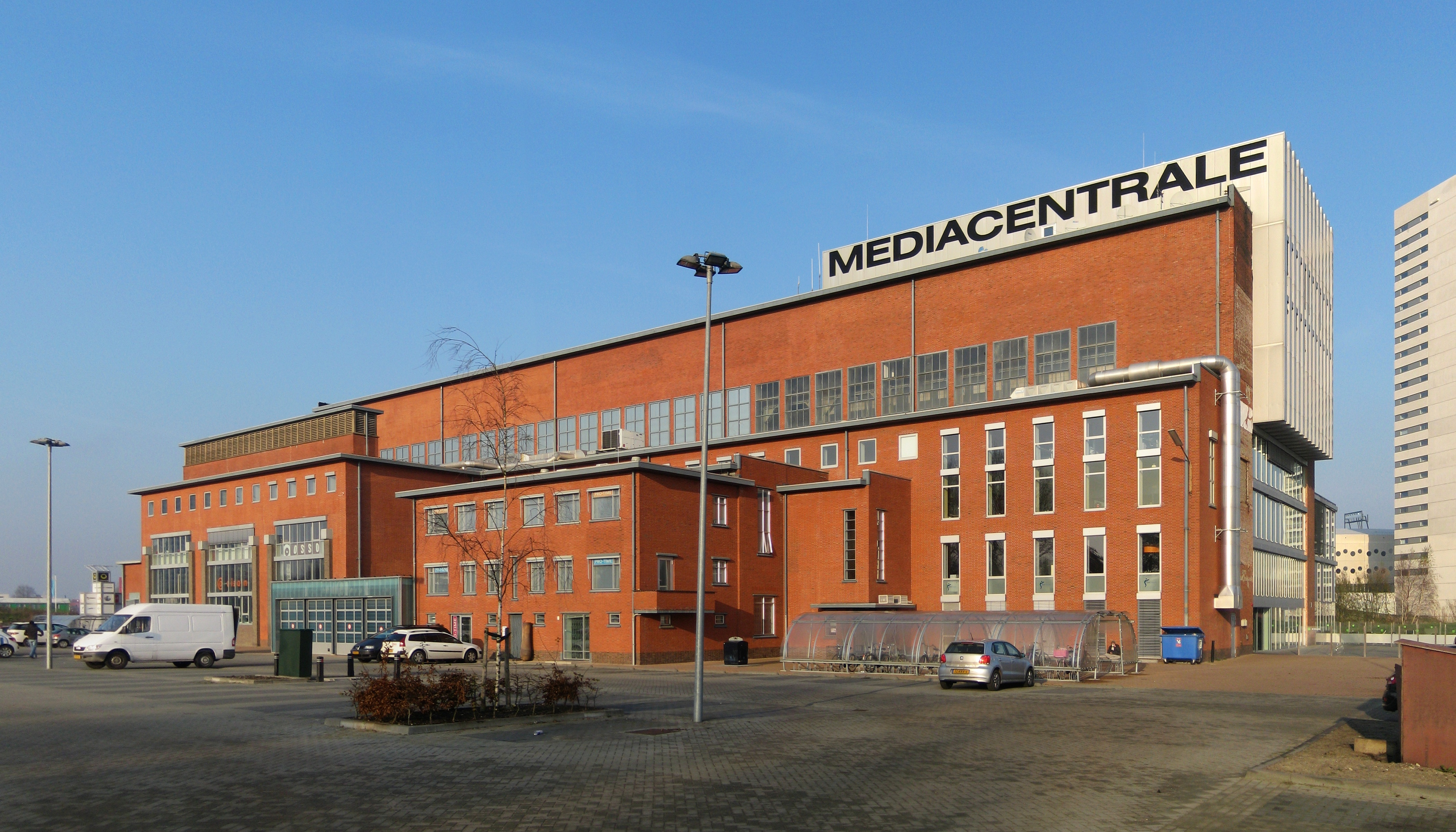
The Mediacentrale at Helperpark in Groningen

On October 19, 1977, the Regionale Omroep Noord en Oost (RONO) was split into three regional broadcasters: Radio Fryslân (for Friesland), Radio Noord (for Groningen and Drenthe) and Radio Oost (for Gelderland and Overijssel). On July 7, 1989, a split was made for the area of the province of Drenthe, and Radio Drenthe was created. Radio Noord thereby became a regional broadcaster exclusively for the province of Groningen.

The name Radio Noord was changed to RTV Noord when the broadcaster also started broadcasting on television in 1995. The first television broadcast was on April 3, 1995.

RTV Noord has been available on the internet since May 1, 1998. A popular part of the broadcaster's website is "Groningen in Beeld" ("Groningen in pictures"), launched in 2005, which features pictures of the Groningen province uploaded by listeners. In 2012, the section contained 7,500 photos.

The studios were located in the Prinsenhof on the Martinikerkhof in the city of Groningen until September 2005. From 2005 to 2025, all broadcasts were made from the studios in the Mediacentrale, a converted former power plant (the Centrale Helpman) in the southeast of the city, which, together with the football stadium Euroborg and others, forms part of Europapark. Since June 16, 2025, RTV Noord has been located in its new premises in the Meerwold business complex, right on the Hoornsemeer in Groningen.

On November 6, 2025, RTV Noord was hacked. The hack had major consequences for broadcasts and publications on all platforms.

== Radio Noord ==
RTV Noord's radio department broadcasts 24 hours a day on 97.5 MHz. The programming includes a lot of regional news but also features music programs and programs in the Gronings dialect of Low Saxon. Presented programs are broadcast between 6:00 AM and 6:00 PM. Non-stop music is played in the evening and at night.

Since spring 2014, RTV Noord has published a chart every Saturday called the Noord 9, a compilation of current Groningen songs. The new list is announced weekly on the radio program Café Martini.

== TV Noord ==
From 1995 to 2012, RTV Noord's television department produced an hour of television every day, including half an hour of news, sports and background information, as well as various programs in the second half-hour, such as Kunstschatten, Vrouger and Cunera op vrijdag. Since 2012, the programming has been shortened to half an hour. This is covered by the program Noord Vandaag. Since February 2013, the quiz program Klouk has been shown after the news and weather.

Since January 2023, Noord Scoort, RTV Noord's new sports program, has been airing every Monday. It features weekly coverage of FC Groningen, Donar and Lycurgus, as well as the lower leagues and all other sports. Each week, the show goes out with a key figure from the Groningen sports world. There are also recurring segments, such as crossbar challenge. The program is hosted by Niiwino Geertsema.

=== Expeditie Grunnen ===
One of RTV Noord's most popular television programs has been Expeditie Grunnen since September 3, 2016, which is broadcast every Saturday and Sunday (and sometimes on public holidays). In the program, they set out in a special bus to see what people in the province are up to. Expeditie Grunnen originated in 2016 based on an idea by Rob Mulder. Best-known presenters are Derk Bosscher and Ronald Niemeijer, who are sometimes alternated by Leonie Albers or Joyce Kranenborg.

The bus initially used for the program, a 1986 Volkswagen Transporter T3, became an iconic symbol among many viewers. In April 2023, the old bus was bid farewell amidst great interest and a new bus (an electric Volkswagen ID. Buzz Pro 150 KW) was introduced. The old bus, which remained in RTV Noord's possession, has been on display at the Nationaal Bus Museum in Hoogezand since late April 2023.
