= NH (broadcaster) =

Dutch regional public broadcaster

- Country: Netherlands
- Headquarters: Hilversum, Netherlands

History
- Launched: 1 January 1989; 36 years ago
- Former names: Radio Noord-Holland; RTV Noord-Holland; RTV NH

Links
- Website: www.nhnieuws.nl

Availability

Streaming media
- NH TV: www.nhnieuws.nl/media
- NH Radio: www.nhnieuws.nl/media

NH Media, officially Stichting RTV NH ('Radio Television North Holland'), is the regional public broadcaster for the Dutch province of North Holland. Its headquarters are located in Hilversum.

NH was founded on 1 January 1989 as Radio Noord-Holland. Since 3 January 2000, NH also broadcasts on television. NH's news division, NH Nieuws, co-operates with local broadcasters, including AT5 (Amsterdam) and WEEFF (West-Friesland).

== Gallery ==
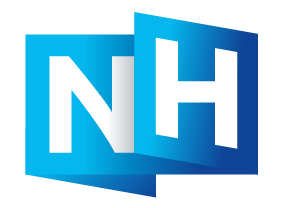
Former logo
