= Pirate radio =

Illegal or unregulated radio transmissions

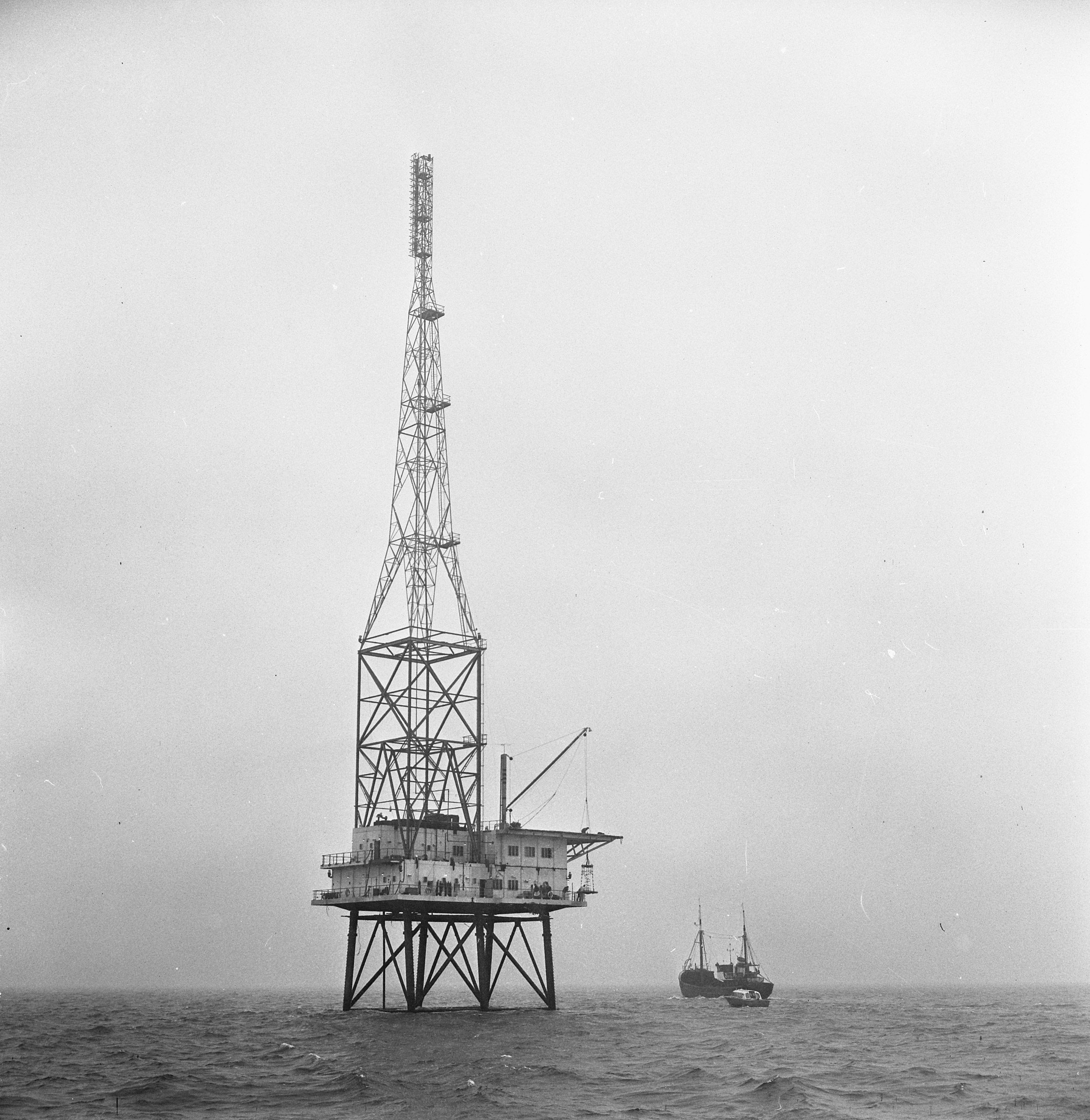
REM Island was a platform off the Dutch coast used as a pirate radio station in 1964 before being dismantled by the Netherlands Marine Corps.

Pirate radio is a radio station that broadcasts without a valid license, whether it has an invalid license or no license at all. In some cases, radio stations are considered legal where the signal is transmitted, but illegal where the signals are received—especially when the signals cross a national boundary.

In other cases, a broadcast may be considered "pirate" due to the nature of its content, its transmission format (especially a failure to transmit a station identification according to regulations), or the transmit power (wattage) of the station, even if the transmission is not technically illegal (such as an amateur radio transmission). Pirate radio is sometimes called bootleg radio (a term especially associated with two-way radio), clandestine radio (associated with heavily politically motivated operations) or free radio.

== History ==
Radio "piracy" began with the advent of regulation of the airwaves at the dawn of the age of radio. Initially, radio, or wireless as it was more commonly called at the time, was an open field of hobbyists and early inventors and experimenters. The degree of state control varied by country. For example, in the UK, Marconi's work was supported by the post office, but in an era of weak regulation, a music hall magician, Nevil Maskelyne, deliberately hijacked a demonstration.

The United States Navy began using radio for time signals and weather reports on the east coast of the United States in the 1890s. Before the advent of vacuum tube technology, early radio enthusiasts used (electronically) noisy spark-gap transmitters. The Navy soon began complaining to a sympathetic press that amateurs were disrupting naval transmissions. The May 25, 1907, edition of Electrical World, in an article called "Wireless and Lawless", reported authorities were unable to prevent an amateur from interfering with the operation of a government station at the Washington, D.C. Navy Yard using legal means.

In the run-up to the London Radiotelegraph Convention in 1912, and amid concerns about the safety of marine radio following the sinking of the RMS Titanic on April 15 of that year, the New York Herald of April 17, 1912, headlined President William Howard Taft's initiative to regulate the public airwaves in an article titled "President Moves to Stop Mob Rule of Wireless".

=== Europe ===
In Europe, Denmark had the first known radio station in the world to broadcast commercial radio from a vessel in international waters without permission from the authorities in the country to which it broadcast (Denmark in this case). The station was named Radio Mercur and began transmission on August 2, 1958. In the Danish newspapers it was soon called a "pirate radio". Radio Mercur changed its name to Radio Syd in March 1962. In the Netherlands in 1964, Radio Noordzee and TV Noordzee began broadcasting from the REM Island and Radio Veronica acquired a new ship, a converted fishing trawler named MV Norderney.

==== United Kingdom ====
In the 1960s in the UK, the term referred to not only a perceived unauthorized use of the state-run spectrum by the unlicensed broadcasters but also the risk-taking nature of offshore radio stations that actually operated on anchored ships or marine platforms. The term had been used previously in Britain and the US to describe unlicensed land-based broadcasters and even border blasters. For example, a 1940 British comedy about an unauthorized TV broadcaster, Band Waggon, uses the phrase "pirate station" several times. A good example of this kind of activity was Radio Luxembourg located in the Grand Duchy of Luxembourg. The English language evening broadcasts from Radio Luxembourg were beamed by Luxembourg-licensed transmitters. The audience in the United Kingdom originally listened to their radio sets by permission of a wireless license issued by the British General Post Office (GPO). However, under terms of that wireless license, it was an offence under the Wireless Telegraphy Act to listen to unauthorized broadcasts, which possibly included those transmitted by Radio Luxembourg. Therefore, as far as the British authorities were concerned, Radio Luxembourg was a "pirate radio station" and British listeners to the station were breaking the law (although as the term 'unauthorized' was never properly defined it was somewhat of a legal grey area). This did not stop British newspapers from printing program schedules for the station, or a British weekly magazine aimed at teenage girls, Fab 208, from promoting the DJs and their lifestyle. (Radio Luxembourg's wavelength was 208 metres (1439, then 1440 kHz)).

Radio Luxembourg was later joined by other well-known pirate stations received in the UK in violation of UK licensing, including Radio Caroline and Radio Atlanta (subsequently Radio Carolines North and South respectively, following their merger and the original ship's relocation), Radio London, and Laser 558, all of which broadcast from vessels anchored outside of territorial limits and were therefore legitimate. Radio Jackie, for instance, although transmitting illegally was registered for VAT and even had its address and telephone number in local telephone directories.

By the 1970s, pirate radio in the UK had mostly moved to land-based broadcasting, transmitting from tower blocks in towns and cities.

=== United States ===
In the US, the 1912 "Act to Regulate Radio Communication" assigned amateurs and experimenters their own frequency spectrum, and introduced licensing and call-signs. A federal agency, the Federal Radio Commission, was formed in 1927 and succeeded in 1934 by the Federal Communications Commission. These agencies would enforce rules on call-signs, assigned frequencies, licensing, and acceptable content for broadcast.

The Radio Act of 1912 gave the president legal permission to shut down radio stations "in time of war". During the first two and a half years of World War I, before US entry, President Wilson tasked the US Navy with monitoring US radio stations, nominally to "ensure neutrality." The US was divided into two civilian radio "districts" with corresponding call-signs, beginning with "K" in the west and "W" in the east. The Navy was assigned call-signs beginning with "N". The Navy used this authority to shut down amateur radio in the western part of the US. When Wilson declared war on Germany on April 6, 1917, he also issued an executive order closing most radio stations not needed by the US government. The Navy took it a step further and declared it was illegal to listen to radio or possess a receiver or transmitter in the US, but there were doubts they had the authority to issue such an order even in war time. The ban on radio was lifted in the US in late 1919.

In 1924, New York City station WHN was accused by the American Telephone and Telegraph Company (AT&T) of being an "outlaw station" for violating trade licenses which permitted only AT&T stations to sell airtime on their transmitters. As a result of the AT&T interpretation, a landmark case was heard in court, which even prompted comments from Secretary of Commerce Herbert Hoover when he took a public stand in the station's defense. Although AT&T won its case, the furor created was such that those restrictive provisions of the transmitter license were never enforced.

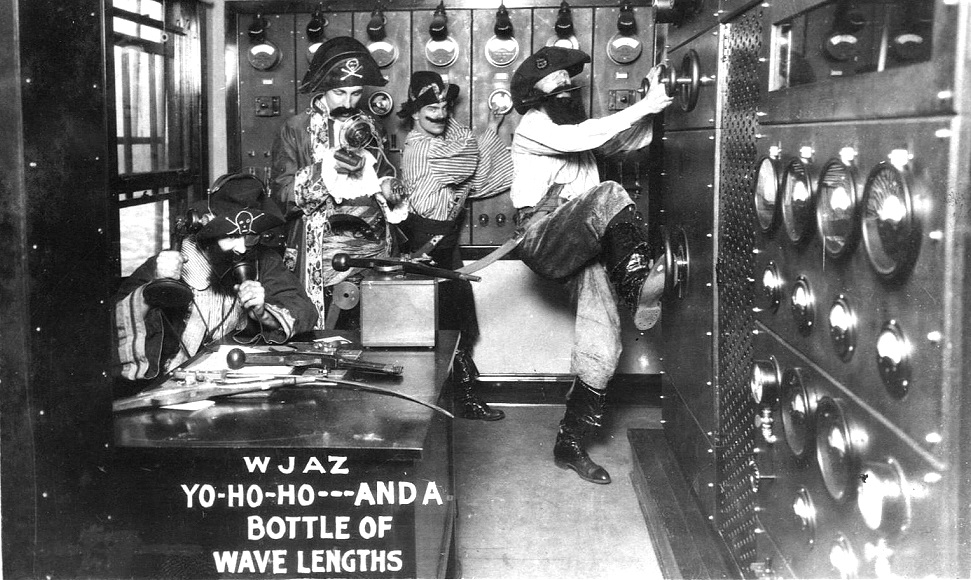
In 1926 WJAZ in Chicago, Illinois, challenged the U.S. government's authority to specify operating frequencies and was charged with being a "wave pirate". The station responded with this February 1926 publicity photograph of its engineering staff dressed as "wave pirates".

In 1926, WJAZ in Chicago changed its frequency to one previously reserved for Canadian stations without getting permission to make the change, and was charged by the federal government with "wave piracy". The resulting legal battle found that the Radio Act of 1912 did not allow the US government to require stations to operate on specific frequencies, and the result was the passage of the Radio Act of 1927 to strengthen the government's regulatory authority.

While Mexico issued radio station XERF with a license to broadcast, the power of its 250 kW transmitter was far greater than the maximum of 50 kW authorized for commercial use by the government of the United States of America. Consequently, XERF and many other radio stations in Mexico, which sold their broadcasting time to sponsors of English-language commercial and religious programs, were labelled as "border blasters", but not "pirate radio stations", even though the content of many of their programs could not have been aired by a US-regulated broadcaster. Predecessors to XERF, for instance, had originally broadcast in Kansas, advocating "goat-gland surgery" for improved masculinity, but moved to Mexico to evade US laws about advertising medical treatments, particularly unproven ones.

== Free radio ==
Another variation on the term pirate radio came about during the "Summer of Love" in San Francisco during the 1960s. "Free radio" usually referred to secret and unlicensed land-based transmissions. These were also tagged as being pirate radio transmissions. Free Radio was used only to refer to radio transmissions that were beyond government control, as was offshore radio in the UK and Europe.

The term free radio was adopted by the Free Radio Association of listeners who defended the rights of the offshore radio stations broadcasting from ships and marine structures off the coastline of the United Kingdom.

Félix Guattari points out:

Technological development, and in particular the miniaturization of transmitters and the fact that they can be put together by amateurs, 'encounters' a collective aspiration for some new means of expression.

— Félix Guattari

== Propaganda broadcasting ==
Propaganda broadcasting may be authorized by the government at the transmitting site, but may be considered unwanted or illegal by the government of the intended reception area. Propaganda broadcasting conducted by national governments against the interests of other national governments has created radio jamming stations transmitting noises on the same frequency to prevent reception of the incoming signal. While the United States transmitted its programs towards the Soviet Union, which attempted to jam them, in 1970 the government of the United Kingdom decided to employ a jamming transmitter to drown out the incoming transmissions from the commercial station Radio North Sea International, which was based aboard the motor vessel (MV) Mebo II anchored off southeast England in the North Sea. Other examples of this type of unusual broadcasting include the USCGC Courier (WAGR-410), a United States Coast Guard cutter which both originated and relayed broadcasts of the Voice of America from an anchorage at the Greek island of Rhodes to Soviet bloc countries. Balloons have been flown above Key West, Florida, to support the TV transmissions of TV Martí, which are directed at Cuba (the Cuban government jams the signals). Military broadcasting aircraft have been flown over Vietnam, Iraq, and many other nations by the United States Air Force.

== Piracy in amateur and two-way radio ==
Illegal use of licensed radio spectrum (also known as bootlegging in CB circles) is fairly common and takes several forms.

=== Unlicensed operation ===
Particularly associated with amateur radio and licensed personal communication services such as GMRS, unlicensed operation refers to use of radio equipment on a section of spectrum for which the equipment is designed but on which the user is not licensed to operate (most such operators are informally known as "bubble pack pirates" from the sealed plastic retail packaging common to such walkie-talkies).

While piracy on the US GMRS band, for example, is widespread (some estimates have the number of total GMRS users outstripping the number of licensed users by several orders of magnitude), such use is generally disciplined only in cases where the pirate's activity interferes with a licensee. A notable case is that of former United States amateur operator Jack Gerritsen—operating under the revoked call sign KG6IRO—who was successfully prosecuted by the FCC for unlicensed operation and malicious interference. A subcategory of this is free banding, the use of allocations nearby a legal allocation, most typically the 27 MHz Citizen's Band using modified or purpose-built gear.

=== Inadvertent interference ===
Inadvertent interference is common when personal communications gear is brought into countries where it is not certified to operate. Such interference results from clashing frequency allocations, and occasionally requires wholesale reallocation of an existing band due to an insurmountable interference problem; for example, the 2004 approval in Canada of the unlicensed use of the United States General Mobile Radio Service frequencies due to interference from users of FRS/GMRS radios from the United States, where Industry Canada had to transfer a number of licensed users on the GMRS frequencies to unoccupied channels to accommodate the expanded service.

=== Deliberate or malicious interference ===
Interference may be deliberate or malicious, such as the use of two-way radio to harass or jam other users of a channel. Such behaviour is widely prosecuted, especially when it interferes with mission-critical services such as aviation radio or marine VHF radio.

=== Illegal equipment ===
Equipment could be illegally modified or not certified for a particular band. Such equipment includes illegal linear amplifiers for CB radio, antenna or circuit modifications on walkie-talkies, the use of "export" radios for free banding, or the use of amateur radios on unlicensed bands that amateur gear is not certified for. The use of marine VHF radio gear for inland mobile radio operations is common in some countries, with enforcement difficult since marine VHF is generally the province of maritime authorities.

== Examples of pirate radio stations ==
- Beat Radio, Minneapolis, United States
- BMIR, Black Rock City, Nevada, United States
- Britain Radio (formerly Swinging Radio England), United Kingdom
- Citizens Radio 102.8 FM, Hong Kong
- Dread Broadcasting Corporation, United Kingdom
- Free Radio Santa Cruz, California, United States
- Kool FM, London, England, United Kingdom
- Laser 558, North Sea, United Kingdom
- Mix FM, Ottawa, Canada
- KQLZ, a legal radio station billed as Pirate Radio Los Angeles (with a mailing address at a P.O. Box in Avalon), United States
- Pirate Cat Radio, San Francisco Bay Area, United States
- Portland Radio Authority, Portland, Oregon, United States
- Radio 270, United Kingdom
- Radio 390, United Kingdom
- Radio Alice, Italy
- Radio Caroline, United Kingdom (now licensed and legal)
- Radio City, United Kingdom
- Radio First Termer, Saigon, Vietnam 1971
- Radio Hauraki, New Zealand (ship, Tiri 1 and Tiri 2) (now licensed and legal)
- Radio Home Run, Tokyo, Japan
- Radio Jackie, United Kingdom (now licensed and legal)
- Radio Mercur, Denmark
- Radio Milinda, Dublin
- Radio North Sea International
- Radio Newyork International, Jones Beach, New York, United States (1987 and 1988 pirate ship)
- Radio Nova, Dublin 1981–1986
- Radio Scotland, United Kingdom (1960s pirate ship)
- Radio Solidarity, Poland (1982–1989)
- Radio Veronica, Netherlands
- Rinse FM, London (gained a license in 2010)
- SIBC, Shetland Islands, (Originally broadcast illicitly onshore, now licensed and legal)
- Thameside Radio London
- TSF, Lisbon, Portugal (now licensed and legal)
- Twilight FM, Hull, East Yorkshire 1993–1997
- Voice of Peace, Israel (pirate ship)
- Wonderful Radio London, United Kingdom

== See also ==
- Border blaster
- Community radio
- Low-power broadcasting
- Open spectrum
- Pirate television

=== Regional articles ===
- Pirate radio in Asia
- Pirate radio in Australia
- Pirate radio in Central America and Caribbean Sea
- Pirate radio in Europe
- Pirate radio in North America
- Pirate radio in the Middle East
