= Jan van Veen =

Dutch radio host and disc jockey (1944–2024)

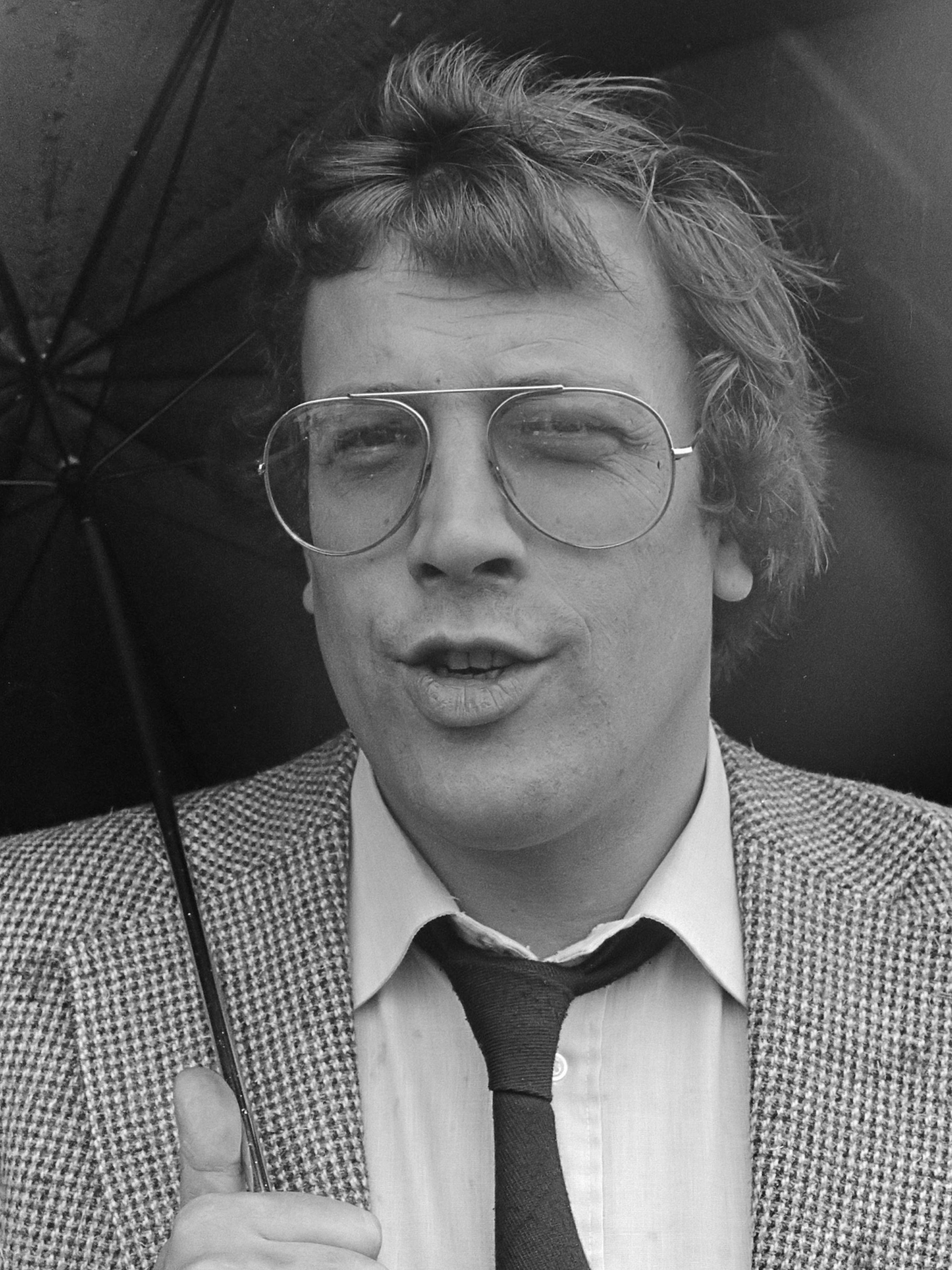
- Van Veen in 1978
- Born: Jan van Veen; 26 August 1944; Voorburg, German-occupied Netherlands
- Died: 4 February 2024 (aged 79); Hilversum, Netherlands
- Occupation(s): Radio presenter and disk jockey
- Years active: 1964–2023
- Known for: Host of Candlelight

Jan van Veen (26 August 1944 – 4 February 2024) was a Dutch disk jockey and radio presenter most known for his radio program Candlelight, which he hosted from 1967 until late 2023.

== Career ==
Van Veen began his career in 1964 at Radio Veronica, an offshore radio station owned by Bull Verweij as a replacement for Tineke de Nooij, who was on maternity leave. He left the channel in 1970.

After he left Radio Veronica, van Veen did commercial and voice-over work. He released a song called "Meer" in 1974, which peaked at number 28 on the Dutch top-40. Two years later, he released a Christmas album named "Ik Geef Je Mijn Woord" which failed to chart. In addition, he was cast in the Dutch version of the "War of the Worlds" radio drama in 1978.

From 1967 to 2023, van Veen hosted the radio program "Candlelight" on Veronica and several other radio programs over the years. Candlelight primarily featured romantic songs and poems. In 2008, the show had 150,000 monthly listeners and in 1997 a book titled "30 Years Candlelight: The 100 Most Beautiful Poems", which featured poems featured on the program. In a survey, 57% of listeners stated that they had never written poetry, while 45% had stated that they had never read poetry themselves. Van Veen noted that over the years the subjects of the poems grew with the age of the listeners. While the poems in the Veronica and Radio 3 period often came from teenagers who declared their love for their object of affection, in later years this shifted to poems about divorce or grief due to the loss of a loved one.

== Personal life ==
Van Veen was appointed a member of the Order of Orange-Nassau on 11 May 2009. He died from the effects of ALS on 4 February 2024, at the age of 79.
