= FRSC =

FRSC can refer to:

- Federal Road Safety Corps of Nigeria
- Fellow of the Royal Society of Canada
- Fellow of the Royal Society of Chemistry
- Free Radio Santa Cruz
- Fuel-rich staged combustion
