= Radio Mercur =

Danish offshore commercial radio station

Copenhagen; Denmark
- Broadcast area: Denmark, southern Sweden
- Frequency: FM (various frequencies)

Programming
- Languages: Danish, Swedish
- Format: Commercial offshore radio

Ownership
- Operator: Peer Jansen, Ib Fogh
- Sister stations: Skånes Radio Mercur

History
- First air date: 2 August 1958
- Last air date: 15 August 1962

Radio Mercur was a Danish offshore broadcasting commercial radio station. It started regular transmission on 2 August 1958 and ceased officially on 31 July 1962, followed by 3 days of transmissions from 13 to 15 August 1962. Later broadcasting took place under the name of Radio Mercur in Majorca from 1969–70 and again on the Spanish Costa del Sol from 1982–84 and finally in Copenhagen, Denmark as a local radio station from 1987-94.

== The first pirate radio ==
A Swedish "pirate" station, Skånes Radio Mercur (changed name to Radio Syd in 1962), started broadcasting on 14 December 1958 from the same ship. It broadcast to the southern province of Sweden, Skåne, and was run by a young man, Nils-Eric Svensson, who had studied radio and TV in the USA and had worked at the government-run Swedish Radio for a very short time.

Radio Mercur was probably the first commercial offshore radio station in the world and gave inspiration to a whole number of offshore radios or pirate radios in Sweden, the Netherlands, Belgium and the United Kingdom during the 1960s. The Danish press soon began to use the expression "pirate radio" on Radio Mercur, and a number of cartoons in newspapers and magazines pictured the radio station with pirate symbols.

Radio Mercur used the fact that radio transmitting in international water was only regulated by international agreements; these didn't take into account the possibility to transmit regularly from an anchored ship. The inspiration for the radio station came from Radio Luxembourg and the American Voice of America, which broadcast from a military vessel, the USCGC Courier, in the Mediterranean.

The success of Radio Mercur directly inspired other groups of radio enthusiasts to begin their own ship-based stations. These included the Dutch stations Radio Veronica and the artificial island based Radio Noordzee along with the Swedish stations Skånes Radio Mercur and Radio Nord close to Stockholm.

== Station and ships ==
In the summer of 1958, 27-year-old office trainee Peer Jansen and his cousin Børge Agerskov grew frustrated with the conservative music played by the Danish National Broadcasting Corporation (Statsradiofonien). They came up with the idea for Radio Mercur, a station that would be entirely funded by advertising and playing pop and rock music.

Agerskov, a law student, identified a legal "grey area" that could be exploited. With the support of millionaire silver trader Ib Fogh, the two cousins secured the funding to challenge the broadcasting monopoly, assembling a diverse group of employees, many of whom had no prior experience.

Radio Mercur was called a pirate radio, because it was considered a lawless attack on the monopoly of Statsradiofonien, though the authorities didn't have any weapon in the first place to stop the "radio pirates".

Radio Mercur made all of its recordings in studios in Copenhagen, Denmark and the tapes were then sailed to a transmitting vessel in international water in Øresund between Denmark and Sweden. Transmissions took place on the FM-band, first on 88,00 MHz, later on different frequencies to be able to meet complaints from the Danish authorities and also to transmit in stereo with dual transmissions on two frequencies simultaneously.

The first transmitting vessel was Cheeta Mercur. It was later accompanied by the larger Cheeta II, placed in Storebaelt between Zeeland and Fuenen in order to cover most parts of Denmark.

In September 1961 another pirate radio station began to compete under the name DCR/The Commercial Radio of Denmark (Danmarks Commercielle Radio). This was started by a group of former Mercur employees. The two stations merged in January 1962 and continued under the name Radio Mercur but with the jingle from DCR. DCR used the vessel Lucky Star for its transmissions.

== Legislation changed ==
The Danish parliament decided on a bill in June 1962, that effectively prohibited all participation in activities supporting transmissions, recordings, etc. after 1 August 1962. At the same time similar bills were pushed through in Sweden and the other Nordic countries. The final song played was Auld Lang Syne by Mitch Miller. According to another account, Radio Mercur's final broadcast featured Admiralens Vise performed by Jørgen Reenberg from the operetta Pinafore.

Transmissions started again some days later, but the Danish authorities took immediate action and sent police out to seize the vessel and end transmissions. In Sweden the station Radio Syd, using two of Mercur's former ships in succession, succeeded transmissions up to 1966 in defiance of the law.

The National Danish Broadcasting Corporation (Danmarks Radio) started a new programme, the so-called Melody Radio (later known as programme 3) on 1 January 1963. The programme was very similar to the programmes on Radio Mercur and several key employees from the pirate radio were working on the programme.

== TV series ==
Adam Price and Morten Fisker's production company Stellanova Film & TV has bought the rights to a film adaptation of Henrik Nørgaard's book about Radio Mercur. As a result, the TV series Mercur was released in 2017.

While some of the Danish actors portraying the big names of the Radio Mercur era have been unknown to the general public, viewers have also seen Johannes Nymark as Frederik van Pallandt from the group Nina & Frederik and Marie Boda as Grethe Ingmann, who with her husband Jørgen Ingmann made hit after hit from the mid-50s onwards.
