= Dutch Album Top 100 =

Dutch albums sales chart

The Dutch Album Top 100 or Album Top 100 is a weekly hit list of music albums, compiled by Dutch Charts. It shows the 100 best-selling music albums of the moment in the Netherlands. The list has passed through various name changes and has expanded from a Top 10 to a Top 100.

== Names ==
Name of chart	From	To
Hilversum 3 LP Top 10	28 June 1969	7 September 1974
Nationale Hitparade LP Top 20	7 September 1974	7 January 1978
Nationale Hitparade LP Top 30	7 January 1978	10 June 1978
Nationale Hitparade LP Top 50	10 June 1978	16 November 1985
Nationale Hitparade Elpee Top 75	23 November 1985	27 September 1986
Nationale Totale Top 75	4 October 1986	25 February 1989
Nationale Totale Top 100	25 February 1989	16 December 1989
LP-MC-CD Top 100 (Nationale Top 100)	16 December 1989	15 May 1991
CD/MC Top 100 (Nationale Top 100)	15 May 1991	6 February 1993
Album Top 100	6 February 1993	6 March 1993
Album Mega Top 100	6 March 1993	15 July 1995
Mega Album Top 100	15 July 1995	10 July 1999
Album Top 100	10 July 1999	present

== Album chart by Stichting Nederlandse Top 40 ==
From 1969 to 1999, an alternative weekly album chart was published by offshore radio station Radio Veronica (1969–1974) and the Stichting Nederlandse Top 40 (1974–1999). This chart varied in length from a top 20 (1969-1971 and from 1972 to 1974) to a top 50 (1971-1972 and 1974–1985), a top 75 (1985–1991) and a top 100 (1991–1999). This album chart was regarded by many as the official one, since it was widely published while the Album Top 100 was not (not until 1993). The Top 40's album chart was terminated in July 1999 when it merged with the Album Top 100e.

== See also ==
- Single Top 100
