= Nooij =

Nooij is a surname. Notable people with the surname include:

- Bas Nooij (born 1987), Dutch baseball player
- Mart Nooij (born 1954), Dutch football manager
- Tineke de Nooij (born 1941), Dutch radio and television presenter
