= Collins 207B-1 Transmitter =

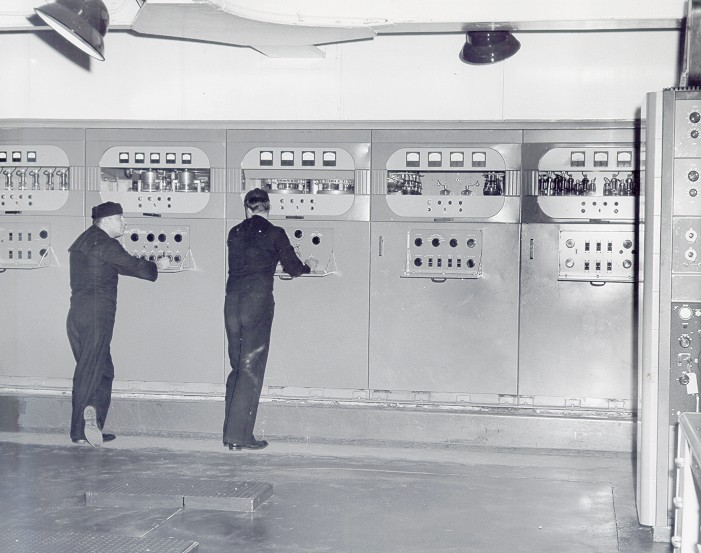
Collins 207B in the transmitting room aboard the USCG Courier.

The Collins 207B-1 was a radio transmitter manufactured in 1951 by Collins Radio Company.

== Specifications ==
The 207B-1 was capable of 35 kilowatts of RF output in amplitude modulation mode, and 50 kilowatts in continuous wave mode. The transmitter was designed for land-based operation within the frequencies of 4 to 26 MHz and was contained within five sheet metal cabinets bolted together to form a single unit with a weight of 16,800 pounds. Intended primarily for high speed telegraphy and broadcasting, the 207B-1 was capable of high power AM transmission and telegraphic or frequency-shift keying at speeds greater than 400 words per minute. It could also be used to amplify the power output of a single-sideband modulation transmitter to a peak envelope power of 30 kilowatts.

== Usage ==
In April 1951 the United States Coast Guard Cutter USCGC Courier was equipped with two 207B-1 transmitters during its time as a ship-borne radio relay station to transmit Voice of America programs behind the Iron Curtain.

== See also ==
- List of radios – List of specific models of radios
