= Portland Radio Authority =

- Portland, Oregon; United States
- Frequency: 96.7 MHz

Programming
- Format: Indie rock, Garage rock, Event broadcasting, Talk radio

History
- First air date: May 10, 2002
- Last air date: March 1, 2006 (Note: The station ceased transmitting, but it continued as an Internet radio station until 2013.)

Technical information
- Power: 100 Watts

Links
- Website: www.praradio.org

Portland Radio Authority (PraRadio) was a listener supported pirate radio station originally broadcasting from a mobile, 100-watt transmitter in Portland, Oregon. Listeners and musicians were encouraged to send tracks to the station, with or without a recording contract, and PraRadio would add the music to its mix. The station operated illegally from May 2002 until March 2006, when the U.S. Federal Communications Commission ended the transmissions.

PraRadio continued to broadcast as an Internet radio station until late September 2013. Over 50 volunteer DJs in weekly two-hour shows featured a variety of music and programming.

PraRadio sponsored a series of benefit concerts to raise money for the station, but eventually the costs of operating the station outpaced revenues, and Portland Radio Authority closed in 2013.
