= Pirate radio in Australia =

Unlicensed radio stations in Australia

Australian radio audiences have had virtually no exposure to pirate radio. There were no broadcasts as part of the World War II propaganda campaigns and commercial as well as community stations alongside the taxpayer funded Australian Broadcasting Corporation were available during the mid to late 1980s and early 1990s - a period when the UK was experiencing a surge in illegal broadcasts during the early days of acid house and the Second Summer of Love. The absence of pirate radio in Australia is primarily attributed to the relatively large number of commercial licences that were issued, particularly after World War II, as well as the existence of public (later renamed community) non-commercial broadcasting licences supported mainly by listener subscription. Additionally, the lack of availability of imported broadcasting equipment and the likely application of severe, legislated penalties including jail for offenders, would also have been a factor.

Amateur radio operators must obtain the appropriate licence of the 16 different types of radiocommunications transmitter (narrowcasting) licences available from the Australian Communications & Media Authority to legally operate on a specific frequency. These licences range in cost from less than $50 up to several thousand dollars.

== Occurrences ==
A small number of the total pirate radio stations in Australia are documented.

- 2 May 1948: “D.I.G., the Diggers' Station” broadcasts an anti-Communist message for 24 minutes, and in the process jams Melbourne commercial station 3UZ for 10 minutes. Over the next 10 days other commercial stations were jammed. Ricardo Blackburn was prosecuted and fined £30. He said he was a member of an organisation of mostly returned soldiers known as Crusaders of Freedom, led by Alec Sutter. Its aim was to encourage trade unionists to attend union meetings and thus outvote the Communists at those meetings.
- Early to mid-1960s: Bruce Jackson and friends from Vaucluse High School were raided by the Postmaster-General's Department for operating an AM pirate station that unbeknown to them covered all of Sydney.
- 1966: Radio Prosh transmits from a ship in international waters off Kangaroo Island. Ernie Sigley plays host.The PMG jams the signal from the mainland. A number of protests result but the station is short lived.
- Early 1970s: University students and draft resisters, protesting against conscription in Australia and the Vietnam War, set up pirate radio stations broadcasting on the AM band called Radio Draft Resistance at Sydney and Melbourne Universities for short periods of time.
- December 1986: A series of test broadcasts from a radio station calling itself Radio Uranus was heard in Melbourne on 98.4 MHz. They said that they were preparing for a major broadcast on Christmas Eve. The test broadcasts consisted of two people (possibly the station's founders) playing music and talking in between tracks. The second test broadcast sounded like they were on a boat, as a boat engine could clearly be heard in the background, and they may have even said that they were on a boat or ship.
- 18–19 November 1989: Radio Uranus was heard once again, with another series of test broadcasts, one on each day, heard on 97.7 MHz. It was not until 5:00 p.m. on 19 November, when the test broadcast ended and a proper broadcast began, that the identity of the station was known. The broadcast consisted of the same format of music and talk as in 1986. According to the presenters, they were using a 10 kW transmitter located in Kinglake, in the outer east of Melbourne. They also hinted a TV broadcast next year, but that never happened. The transmission even featured a cross to their 'stereo cruiser' located near the city. The broadcast ended suddenly some time after 8:30 p.m. when the presenters interrupted the song being played to say that they were raided. Mentions of rebroadcasts to Fiji suggest HF may have occurred.
- 1990s: Two pirates broadcasting on shortwave from Australia were heard worldwide. The stations were called Radio G'day and Tasmania Radio Int.
- 1991: An FM pirate radio station called "Radio Heinz" broadcast from Wangaratta, with a power of 50W for three months. The station played entire music albums with voice announcements in between. It gained rapid popularity as an alternative to the 3NE commercial station and WPR-FM community radio station, until it was forced to shut down.
- 1992: A short range radio broadcaster calling itself Rex FM broadcasts in the Ballarat central business district at intermittent intervals over the course of a fortnight. The format is music and talk.
- 30 December 1992: A pirate radio station calling itself 3PPP was heard on the FM band in the inner suburbs of Melbourne from before 10:30 p.m. till some time after midnight. The broadcast featured music and talk.
- 2001: Radio Eureka made several broadcasts with power of approximately 12 Watts on frequency 6235 kHz.
- 2006: March–November. Jason Tresize operated a transmitter on frequency 105.7 MHz of 25 Watts serving the Bendigo region. Although being issued a caution notice, Tresize went on to operate until finally ceasing operations in 2011.
- 2007: At the age of 12, Tim Wong See operated a pirate radio station called '2FT' from his home in West Pennant Hills before the ACMA shut it down.
- 2008: April–September. 105.7 MHz was heard once again in the Bendigo region. The broadcast consisted mainly of dance music with regular hosts, including live from the "Bathroom Nightclub."
- 2011: August–November. 105.7 MHz was heard yet again in the Bendigo region, This time on 40 Watts and playing predominately dance music. The station was closed by the Australian Communications & Media Authority consequently having equipment seized.
- 2011: 25 September-5 October. A station was heard in the south-eastern suburbs of Melbourne on 1485 kHz on several evenings commencing 25 September. The station carried a rebroadcast of My MP, a digital only commercial radio station. On 5 October, the Australian Communications and Media Authority reported that it shut down an unlicensed AM radio station operating on 1485 kHz from Chadstone following a complaint.
- 2011: -December. Andrew Drysdale broadcast ABD Radio from his Chatswood, NSW home until shut down in December, 2011.
- 2015: Terence Sulman operated a transmitter on 101.3 MHz in Portland, Victoria. Sulman was convicted, fined $600 and was ordered to forfeit all radio equipment, after pleading guilty in the Portland Magistrates Court. According to ACMA, Sulman "was trying to offer something like a local commercial radio station, so he sold advertising and sponsorship to local businesses", hence ACMA's decision to seek prosecution.
- 2016: 29 February. Dan Morris's West Wollongong home was raided by the ACMA to shut down his pirate station IRIE FM. In January he was interviewed for Vice.com in an article, titled 'Meet Australia's Preeminent Jamaican Pirate Radio Broadcaster'. It proved to be his undoing, after the ACMA saw it and investigated. Magistrate Michael Stoddart fined Morris a total of $3,000 and ordered the transmitter be forfeited.
- 2017: 31 January. Following the closure of Radio Australia's domestic shortwave service a pirate was heard broadcasting on the newly vacated frequency of 4835 kHz. The content was of a protest nature including audio grabs of Tony Abbott stating there would be no cuts to the ABC's funding.
- 2016-?: Graffiti writer and DJ, "Whiz" of TKG crew promotes a now-defunct drum and bass pirate radio station around Melbourne via stickers, aired on 99.9 MHz with frequent shows and guest performances. The station has been on indefinite hiatus without updates for several years, most likely due to the COVID-19 lockdown restrictions in Melbourne affecting the ability to operate clandestine transmitters inconspicuously.
- 2022: July-November. A station was heard in the western suburbs of Melbourne, occasionally operating on the frequency 108.0 MHz during the evenings. The broadcasts mainly consisted of songs by the band Rage Against the Machine, Atlanta rapper 21 Savage and the Soviet band Kino.
- 2019-2025 - Reggae Trojan Radio Newcastle NSW - This pirate radio station has been on air since 2019, originally broadcasting from Lambton, it was moved to a location near to the corner of Elizabeth Street and Maitland Road Tighes Hill. There is a playlist on Spotify called "89.3 Newcastle by Louie Durham" matching music played by the station. The station has been praised by listeners on Reddit as a good alternative to the mainstream stations. After going off-air for some time, Trojan Radio returned in late 2024, pleasing the listeners of Newcastle. However, on 28 February 2025, the Australian Communications and Media Authority finally shut down the station and confiscated the transmitter responsible, ending Trojan Radio 89.3 FM after 6 years of broadcasting, upsetting loyal listeners. Luckily though, the operator behind the station managed to escape a hefty fine.
- 2025: 7 March. A station was heard in the regional Victorian town of Mildura, re-broadcasting the 3MP 1377 Melbourne signal on 90.1 MHz. This is the second time an unlicensed station has been retransmitting 3MP on the airwaves, but this time on the FM band.

== See also ==
- Radio in Australia
