= BMIR =

Burning Man Information Radio

Black Rock City, Nevada; United States
- Broadcast area: Burning Man in the Black Rock Desert
- Frequency: 94.5 MHz

Programming
- Format: Community radio (public)

History
- First air date: 2000

Links
- Webcast: BMIR stream
- Website: www.bmir.org

BMIR 94.5 FM (Burning Man Information Radio) is the unlicensed community radio station for Burning Man, an event held annually in Black Rock Desert, Nevada. BMIR begins broadcasting on 94.5 FM on the playa in the week leading up to Burning Man. Currently, the station hosts more than 40 DJs that produce the programming played over the course of the event.

== History ==
BMIR was founded by Carmen Mauk in 2000. Although the station violates federal regulations related to pirate radio and licensing radio stations, BMIR is mentioned in the Bureau of Land Management's Special Use Permit of federal lands as an event emergency broadcast alert system; the BLM, however, has no authority to permit its operation. Other licensed radio stations do exist that are within broadcast range of Burning Man but BMIR does not interfere with commercial broadcasting. BMIR remains operational without successful enforcement by the Federal Communications Commission (FCC) to shut the station down. Prior to 2010, BMIR only broadcast live during the day, with automated nighttime programming. Starting in 2010, BMIR began broadcasting 24 hours a day, year round with live radio personalities and interviews under the name Shouting Fire, but now only broadcasts during the event. Shouting Fire evolved into its own Burning Man related broadcast entity and continues to operate year-round operated by former BMIR management personnel.

== Current status ==
BMIR usually broadcasts from the event from the Thursday before to the Tuesday after, with a full-time staff present during that time. BMIR is utilized during the event to broadcast important information regarding traffic, weather, and other BLM and law enforcement notices. The station has played a prominent part in dealing with issues happening in the "default world" including Hurricane Katrina and earthquakes in the Bay Area.

The station's primary operating crew is composed of a wide variety of skillsets, including an RF/FM engineer, a sound engineer, an IT engineer, and a full-time volunteer coordinator. The station accepts a few new volunteers every year, with on-air slots becoming available in the second year of service to the station. Many current and former station personnel are professional broadcasters.
