= USCGC Courier =

Former US Coast Guard cutter

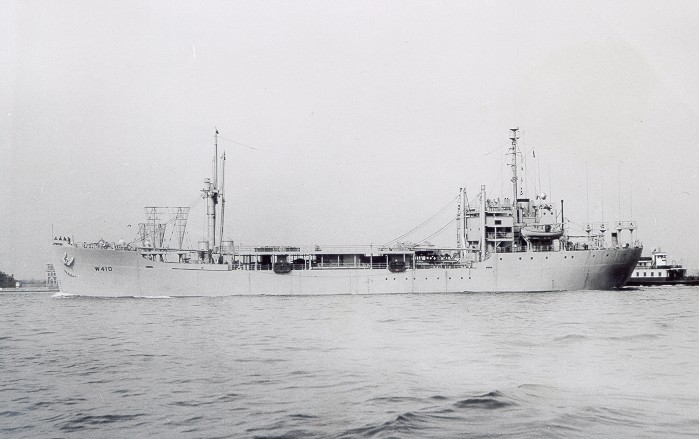
- USCGC Courier.

History

United States
- Name: USCGC Courier
- Builder: Froemming Brothers, Milwaukee, WI.
- Laid down: 25 January 1945
- Launched: 1945
- Commissioned: 25 March 1945 (Commercial); 15 February 1952 (USCG WAGR-410); 30 April 1966 (USCG WTR-410)
- Decommissioned: 25 August 1964 (WAGR-410); 1972 ((WTR-410))
- Honours and awards: Coast Guard Unit Commendation (awarded 9 March 1992)
- Fate: Scrapped 1977
- Notes: Naval call sign: NFKW
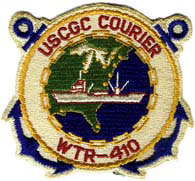
- Badge: Crest of the USCGC Courier WTR-410

General characteristics
- Class & type: Maritime Commission Type C1-M-AV1
- Displacement: 5,650 long tons (5,740 t)
- Length: 338.75 ft (103.25 m)
- Beam: 50.33 ft (15.34 m)
- Draft: 17.25 ft (5.26 m)
- Propulsion: 1 × 1,700 SHP two-cycle 6-cylinder Norberg diesel; single screw
- Speed: 10.6 kn (19.6 km/h; 12.2 mph) maximum
- Range: 24,273 miles
- Complement: 1952: (USCG) 10 officers, 80 enlisted; (USIA) 3 radio engineers, 1 program coordinator. 1966: 10 officers, 45 enlisted
- Sensors & processing systems: SO-4 (1952); SPS-23 (1966)
- Armament: none

The USCGC Courier (WAGR/WTR-410) was a cutter in the United States Coast Guard converted from the M/V Coastal Messenger, a Maritime Commission Type C1-M-AV1 vessel.

== M/V Coastal Messenger (1945–1952) ==
Originally launched in 1945 by Froemming Brothers of Milwaukee, Wisconsin as the M/V Coastal Messenger, the ship was to be originally named Doddridge but was changed prior to acceptance by the Maritime Administration. The ship was originally designed as an inter-island shuttle for military and naval cargoes. She was designed to receive cargo from much larger Victory and Liberty ships and then deliver it to U.S. forces on small outlying islands but was actually never used for that purpose due to the end of World War II. In the late-1940s, the M/V Coastal Messenger was operated by both the Standard Fruit & Steamship Company and Grace Line, Inc., primarily along the coasts to northern South America. On a trip to South America she ran aground at La Salina on Lake Maracaibo, Venezuela but was freed after 11 days with extensive, though minor, damage. She was then mothballed with the reserve fleet and transferred to the control of the Department of State in 1952.

== USCGC Courier WAGR-410 (1952–1964) ==
The United States Coast Guard Cutter Courier was acquired as part of a joint operation between the United States Department of State and the United States Coast Guard to become a mobile transmitting facility for the U.S. Information Agency's "Voice of America" (VOA) program. In response to an initiative, code-named Operation Vagabond, that was approved by President Harry S. Truman and the Joint Chiefs of Staff and announced by the Department of State in April, 1951, the operation was designed to provide a ship-borne radio relay station to transmit Voice of America programs behind the Iron Curtain. Such a vessel could move to any areas of trouble quickly, could serve as a temporary relay station as needed, and permit the use of a station where it was impractical to build a shore station. To ease political sensitivities, it was decided that the Coast Guard should operate the vessels, which, in the planning stages were to have been a total of six vessels. Excessive costs, however, kept the operation to a single vessel.

Commissioned on February 15, 1952, in Hoboken, New Jersey, Courier's call sign was "Vagabond-Able". For twelve years during the 1950s and 1960s, she served as a portion of the Voice of America radio network during the Cold War, at a time when the Soviet Union had attempted to jam portions of the network. The Courier contained the most powerful communications radio transmitter ever installed on board a ship, an RCA BT-105 150-kilowatt mediumwave transmitter, as well as two Collins 207B1 type 35-kilowatt shortwave transmitters as well as a Collins Radio Company 51J-type receiver.

President Harry S. Truman visited the Courier on March 4, 1952, when the ship docked in Washington, D.C. and he used the occasion to broadcast a major policy speech beamed at Eastern Europe and the Soviet Union.

On April 18, 1952, during the Courier's shakedown cruise to the Panama Canal Zone, using the call sign KU2XAJ, tests were performed at 1700–2300 on 6110 and 9690 kc. shortwave (35 kW), and 1510 kc. medium wave (150 kW). The broadcasts closed with the playing of the Panamanian National Anthem and the Star Spangled Banner. The Courier initially used a $18,000 35' × 69' barrage balloon that held the medium wave antennae aloft. The Courier carried 5 of these balloons, but on more than one occasion the balloon broke free. Eventually it was decided to replace the balloon with a mast-supported wire antenna.

The Courier also held the record for longest deployment overseas - from 17 July 1952 to 13 August 1964, she spent no time in United States territorial waters being stationed instead off the island of Rhodes, Greece during that time.

Courier was decommissioned on 25 August 1964 upon her return to Yorktown, Virginia and turned over to the Coast Guard Reserve Training Center at Yorktown, Virginia. Placed in "out of commission, in Reserve" status, beginning July 1, 1965, Courier provided dockside training in merchant marine safety and dangerous cargo handling for the next year.

== USCGC Courier WTR-410 (1966–1972) ==
The USCGC Courier WTR-410 was recommissioned into the Coast Guard at Yorktown, Virginia on 30 April 1966. Here the Courier's mission was to serve as a mobile operational training platform with qualified personnel attached and to aid by giving guidance during operational Port Security training at various sites during two week active duty for training periods. The Courier's area of operation covered the East Coast, the Gulf of Mexico, and the Great Lakes.

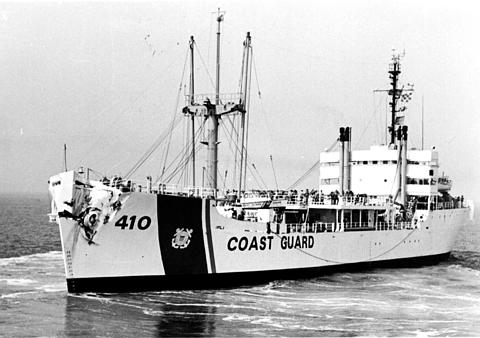
The CGC Courier in June 1970 after colliding with the USS Pocono (AGC-16) in the Chesapeake Bay.

In June 1970 the USS Pocono suffered damage to her bow after colliding with the Courier, who also suffered bow damage in the Chesapeake Bay.

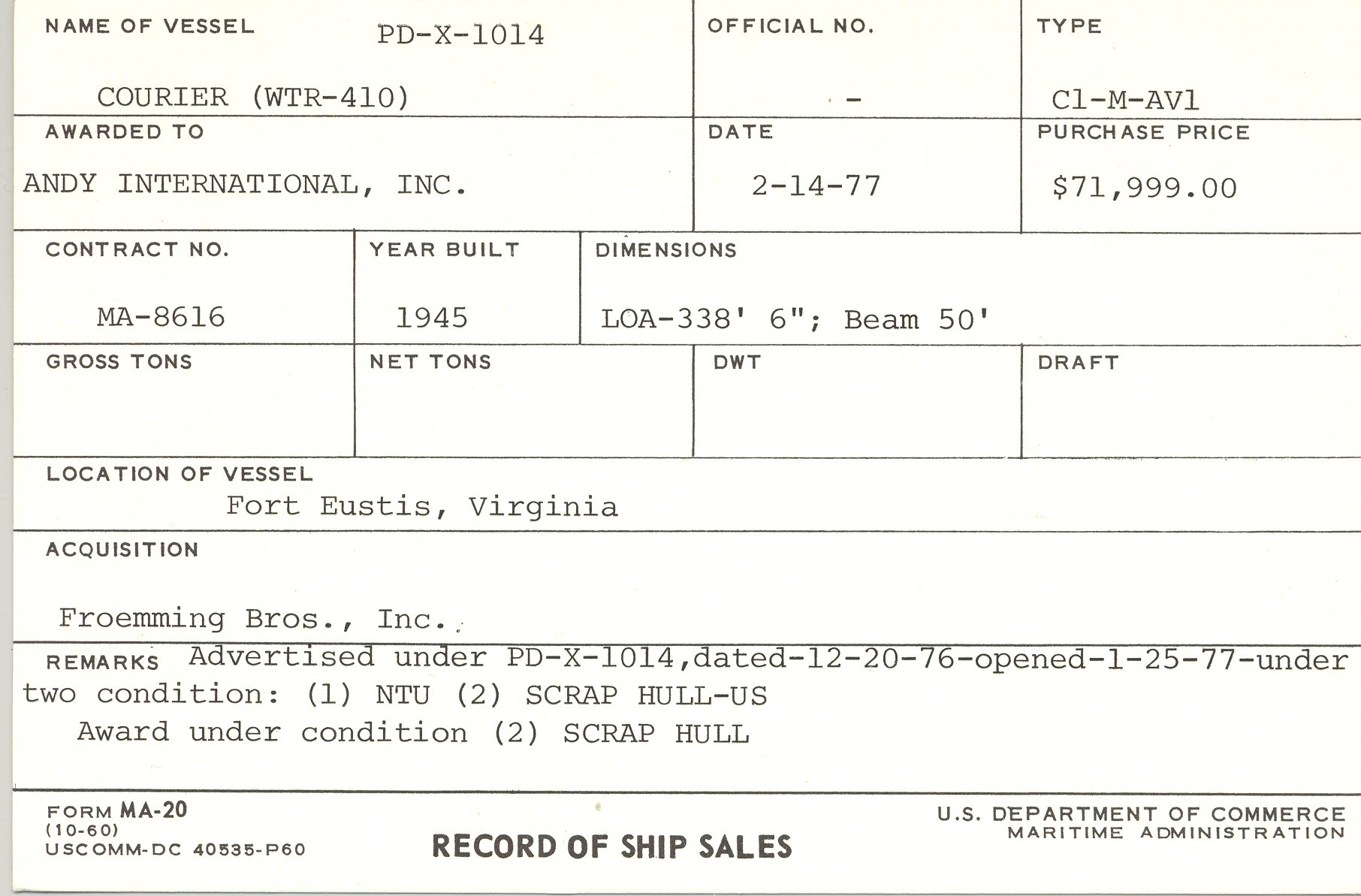
MARAD document for scrapping of USCGC Courier 410-WAGR/WTR

The Courier's homeport remained the Reserve Training Center in Yorktown and she finished her Coast Guard career as a training vessel for reservists. She carried accommodations for 220 trainees, patrol boats, and communication equipment. Her small boats were used to train reservists in harbor patrols while her cargo handling equipment was employed to train reservists in handling dangerous cargoes.

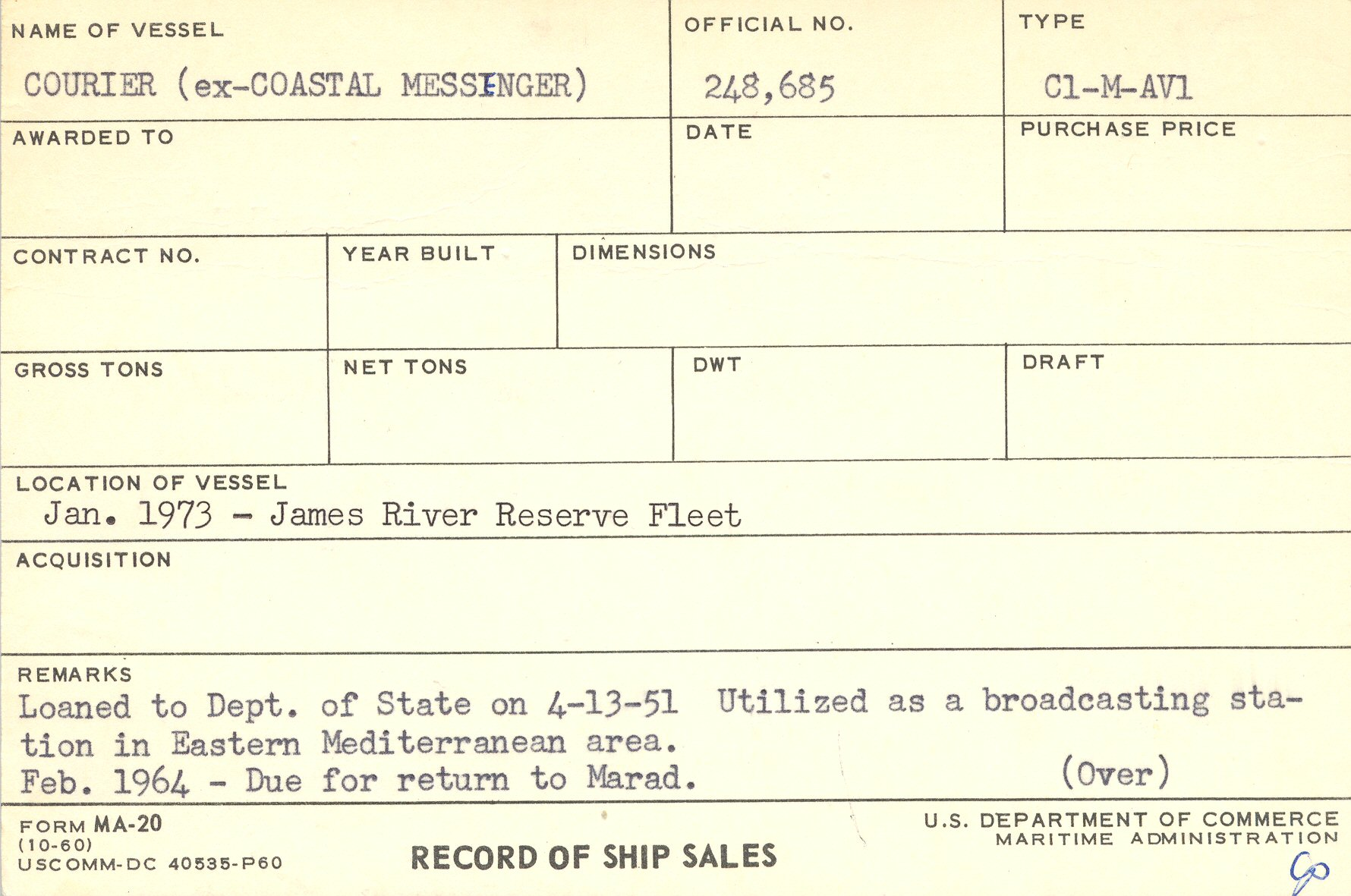
MARAD 3A Documents final decommission for USCGC Courier 410 WAGR WTR

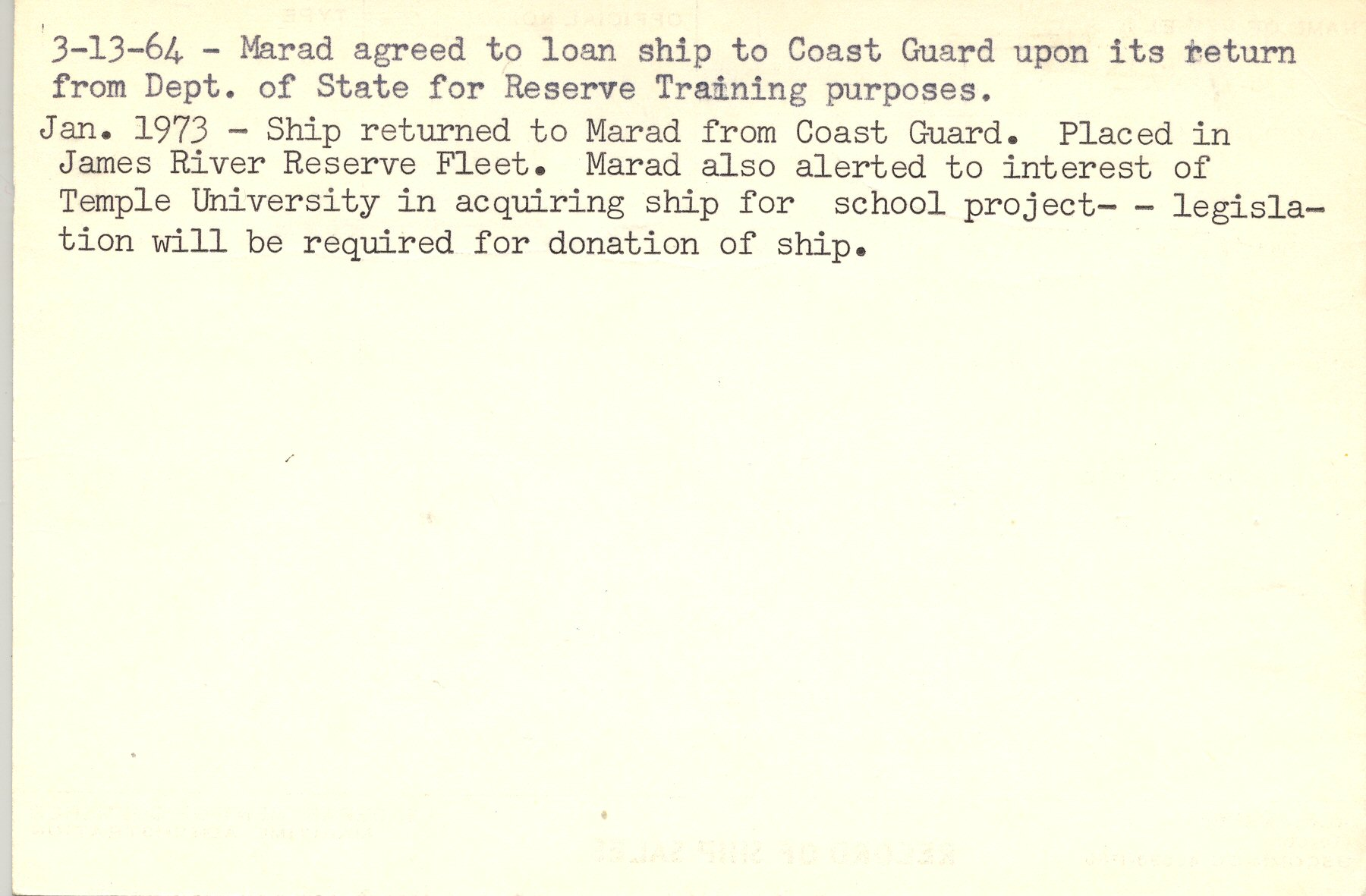
MARAD 3B backside MARAD record for final decommission USCGC Courier 410 WAGR WTR

USCGC Courier 410-WAGR/WTR was decommissioned in 1972 and scrapped in 1977.

== Pirate radio inspiration ==
It has sometimes been claimed that the Courier's offshore broadcasts directly inspired such offshore pirate radio stations as Radio Mercur and Radio Caroline. A balloon-raised antenna similar to that used by the Courier was also attempted by the pirate Laser 558 in 1984, with similar results.

== Notable accomplishments ==
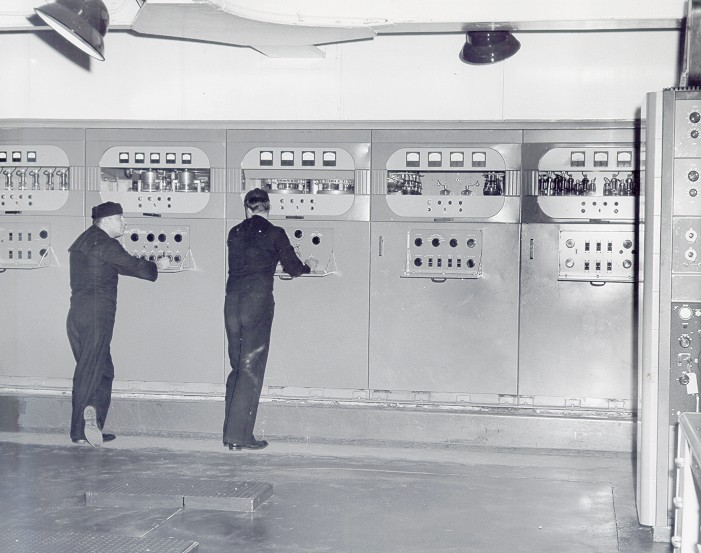
Collins 207B radio transmitter aboard the USCG Courier.

- Contained the most powerful communications radio transmitter ever installed on board a ship.
- Longest deployment overseas - from 17 July 1952 to 13 August 1964.
