= Bull Verweij =

Dutch businessman

Hendrik "Bull" Verweij
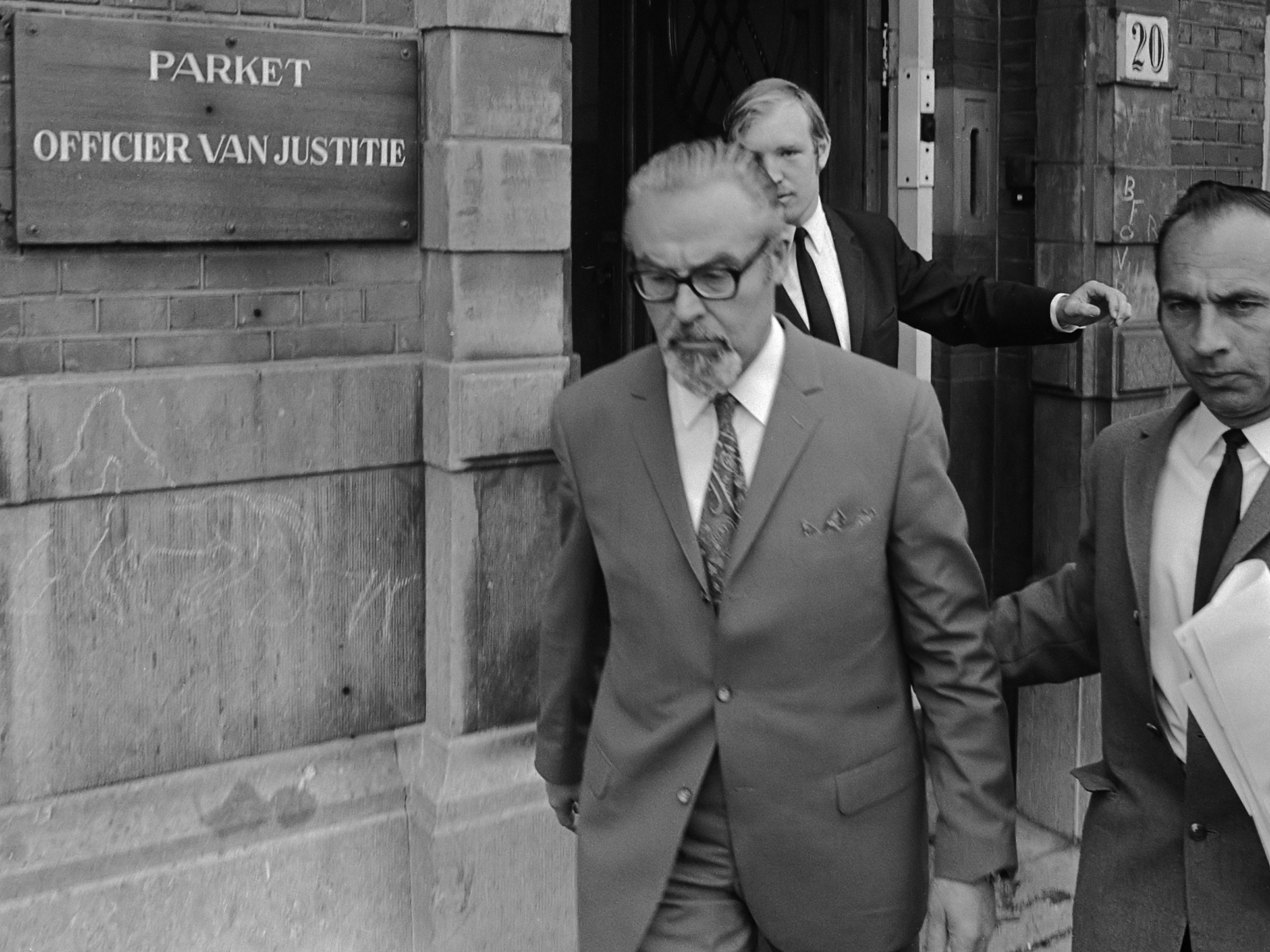
- Bull Verweij in 1972
- Born: 12 September 1909; Hilversum, Netherlands
- Died: 19 February 2010 (aged 100); Loosdrecht, Netherlands
- Years active: 1959-1975
- Known for: Co-founder of the Dutch offshore radio station Radio Veronica
- Family: Jaap Verweij (brother); Dirk Verweij (brother)

Hendrik "Bull" Verweij (12 September 1909 – 19 February 2010) was one of the founders of the Dutch offshore radio station Radio Veronica, and was president of the station from its founding in 1959 until 1975. He was born in Hilversum. After Veronica was forced to stop, one of the DJs of the station, Rob Out, formed the Veronica Omroep Organisatie: a legal entity that grew from a candidate broadcasting organisation to the largest broadcaster in the country.

== The Veronica brothers ==
Bull was one of the three initial brothers who, together, formed the offshore radio station Veronica. From 1960 the offshore radio station transmitted from a former German lightvessel the "Borkum Riff" and in 1964 the three brothers decided to buy a larger trawler that was destined for scrapping: the Norderney.

Bull was the founder and driving force behind offshore radio in the Netherlands. He developed the business model for commercial radio in the Netherlands. Initially Bull and his brothers Jaap and Dirk were in the textile trade. He realized that the existing Dutch public broadcasting system didn't appeal to the younger generation. The younger generation listened to foreign stations, such as Radio Luxemburg, and the Verweij brothers decided to start an offshore radio station. Radio formats that are now common place, such as "horizontal programming" were introduced by the Verweijes.

He also introduced advertising on radio in the Netherlands. The public radio stations in those years were completely funded by the state and it was not possible for companies to reach out to the public via national radio-stations. Bull Verweij was seen as the initiator of commercial broadcasting and modern radio formats in The Netherlands.

== Controversy on Mebo II ==
Another radio ship, the Mebo II, was partly financed by the owners of Veronica when its owners, Meister and Bollier, needed capital, on the condition it would broadcast off the English coast, targeting the UK. However, legal changes forced the ship to relocate. Despite the deal with Veronica they dropped anchor next to the Norderney and started targeting the Dutch audience. As the transmitters of the Mebo II were very powerful Veronica was afraid they would lose market-share to the Mebo II transmissions. In addition, the Dutch government threatened to ratify the new international Treaty of Stasbourg that would make offshore radio illegal which would also be the end of Veronica.

Co-owner and advertising manager Norbert Jürgens advised Verweij to sabotage the anchors of the Mebo II so it would drift within the 6 mile-zone, bringing the ship within (legal) reach of Dutch law and getting it confiscated for having illegal radio transmission equipment on board. Unlike Veronica's Norderney the Mebo II had its own engines so these would have to be sabotaged as well before breaking the anchor chains. Without talking to Verweij, Jürgens changed the job for three divers hired to sabotage the anchors and ordered them to actually bomb an old-line in the engine room to start a fire that would force the Mebo II to be towed to the nearest harbour (or let the ship sink).

Execution of the plan went wrong. When the crew on board the Mebo II heard the bomb explode, they saw a small boat sail away from the Mebo II towards the coast, and an SOS call was sent out in the middle of the radio-show. The three divers, who were promised 25,000 guilders to sabotage the ship, were arrested and that led quickly towards Jürgens and also Verweij. The Radio Veronica staff demanded an explanation and threatened a strike. Verweij appeared on Dutch television revealing that he had paid the three divers, but only to get the Mebo II into territorial waters in a way which would not harm anybody on board. He wanted to force the Mebo II inside the six nautical mile limit so that Dutch authorities could confiscate the "pirate radio" . Nevertheless, both Jürgens, Verweij and the three divers were convicted and sentenced to one year in prison. He was later sentenced to three months in jail.

Verweij later admitted that, while he stood by his version of the story, he was fully responsible for the bombing and regretted his involvement..

The plan completely backfired, as the general public sympathized with Radio Noordzee and the station gained popularity. The additional radio ship targeting the Dutch marketplace, and the powerful signal from the Mebo II, were the direct reason for Dutch Parliament to vote in favour of ratifying the Strasbourg Treaty, leading to the closing down of Veronica and Radio Noordzee on 31 August 1974.

== After Radio Veronica ==
Verweij turned 100 years old in 2009, and received a Lifetime Achievement Award from news anchor Arend Langenberg for his influence on Dutch commercial radio. He died in his sleep in a retirement home in Loosdrecht.
