= MV Norderney =

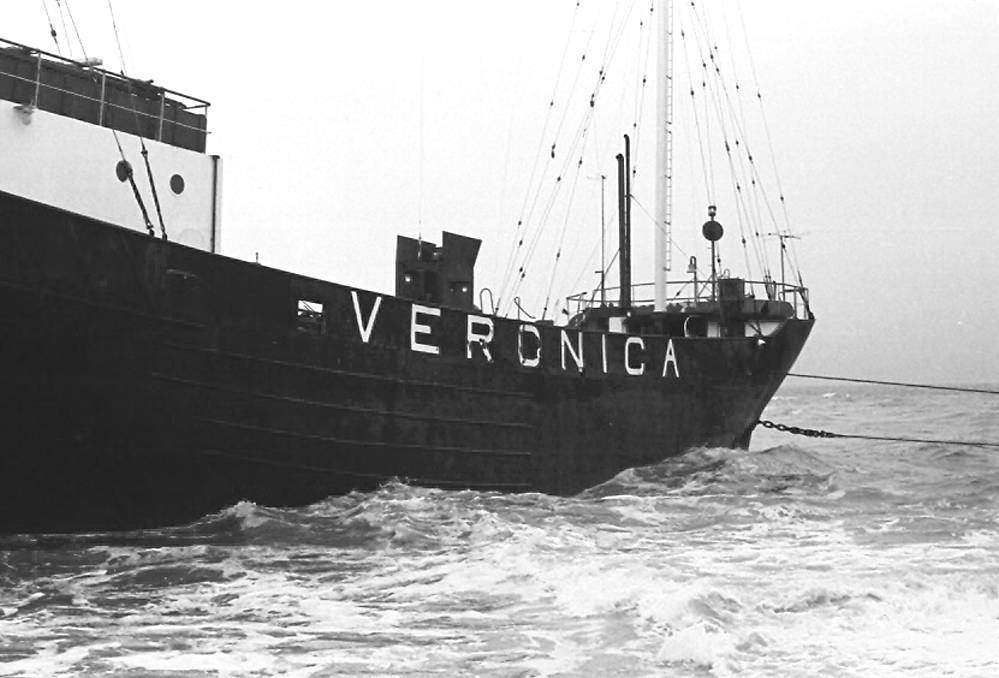
- MV Norderney in April 1973, while broadcasting for Radio Veronica

History
- Name: 1949–1956: Paul J. Müller; 1956–present: Norderney
- Builder: Deutsche Werft, Finkenwerder, Hamburg, Germany
- Launched: 1949

MV Norderney was from November, 1964 until 31 August 1974 the transmission ship for offshore radio station Radio Veronica.

== History ==
Norderney was built in 1949 as the MV HH 294 Paul J Müller in Hamburg-Finkenwerder. This 50 metre long trawler was in service as fishing-vessel in the waters around Iceland from 1950 until 1956 and in July of that year it was sold to the Niedersächsische Hochseefischerei GmbH. (Lower Saxony deepsea fishing Ltd.) and was re-christened as NC 420 Norderney.

In 1960, the then 11-year-old vessel was sold to a Dutch company for scrapping. In early 1964 the brothers Verweij bought the ship. The 3 brothers formed the management of Radio Veronica. Norderney was bought to replace the former German lightvessel Borkum Riff from 1911 as that vessel was completely worn-out and also a little bit too small to continue to be operated as a radio ship. As a (former) light-vessel Borkum Riff had her name printed in large letters on the hull of the ship: this idea was copied on Norderney, even though she wasn't a light-ship.

On the Zaanlandse Scheepsbouw Maatschappij shipyard in Zaandam the trawler was transformed into an offshore radio-ship. The works included placement of two 25 meter high wooden antenna-masts to connect the washing-line antenna (nickname for the random wire antenna). Originally Norderney was built as a steamship and the boiler and engine was already removed from the ship when it was bought by the Verweij brothers. This provided the required space for a large studio and a separate large room for the transmission equipment.

A Continental Electronics 316 C medium wave transmitter of 10 Kilowatt. At a later date a second similar transmitter was installed as backup. In November 1964, Norderney entered service and took over the role of the old Borkum Riff.

== Stranding ==
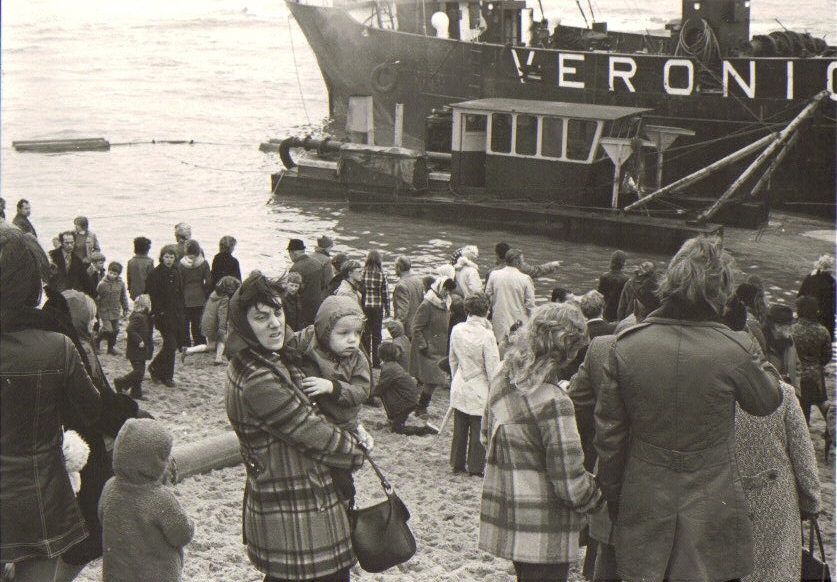
Norderney, stranded after a storm on 2 April 1973 on the beach of Scheveningen. (photo: 7 April)

During a severe storm on 2 April 1973 at 20:54 hours the anchors of the Nordeney didn't hold and the vessel was drifting. As the ship had no engines she drifted towards the coast at Scheveningen and around 23:30 she ran aground high up the beach of Scheveningen. The crew was already taken off-board by the KNRM lifeboat Bernard van Leer.

Just before the crew left the ship they removed the crystals from the radio-transmitter so that Norderney was legally not being a radio-ship (as that would have been against the law in the Netherlands).

The ship stranded high up on the beach and it took until 7 April before they managed to turn the ship and get the bow pointing towards the sea. It had already been planned to organise a large demonstration on the Binnenhof in The Hague to convince members of parliament not to support new legislation that would outlaw off-shore radio stations. In support of this Radio Veronica needed to be on air during the demonstration the management of Veronica accepted an offer from competitor Radio Caroline to use her ship and transmitter if Veronica assisted in repairing the equipment on board of the ship Mi-Amigo.

In the early hours of 18 April, exactly the day of the planned demonstration in The Hague, tugboats managed to get Norderney back afloat and she was brought back to her original position, some 6 nautical miles from the coast - just outside the territorial waters. At around 16:00 that day, Norderney was back in service and Radio Veronica could be received via her own frequency on the 538 meter-band as well as on 259 meter via the transmitter of Radio Caroline.

== Last transmission ==
In spite of the above mentioned large demonstration of 18 April 1973 and large popular support for Radio Veronica and other off-shore radio stations, new laws were introduced that made transmitting from sea, even in international waters, a crime. Also advertising via an off-shore radio station became illegal which meant the end for Radio Veronica and other "pirate radio stations". The people behind Radio Veronica formed the Veronica Omroep Organisatie (VOO) who applied for a broadcasting status. Although the government was accused of trying to keep this follow-up of the former pirate out of the public broadcasting system, the VOO got a license. In 1976 the VOO got a license and the first programmes were broadcast via the national radio and TV stations. Veronica remained a public broadcaster for many years, but when it was all legalized they switched back to a commercial station in 1994.

On 31 August 1974 at 18:00 the station ended her transmissions. During the last hour one could hear a clock ticking counting down and a very emotional Rob Out held a speech saying that with the end of Radio Veronica a part of the democracy died. After that they played a part of the Dutch national anthem, the Wilhelmus, and then a bit of the main Veronica jingle. With the removal of the crystal from the transmitter the story ended.

== Post 31 August 1974 ==
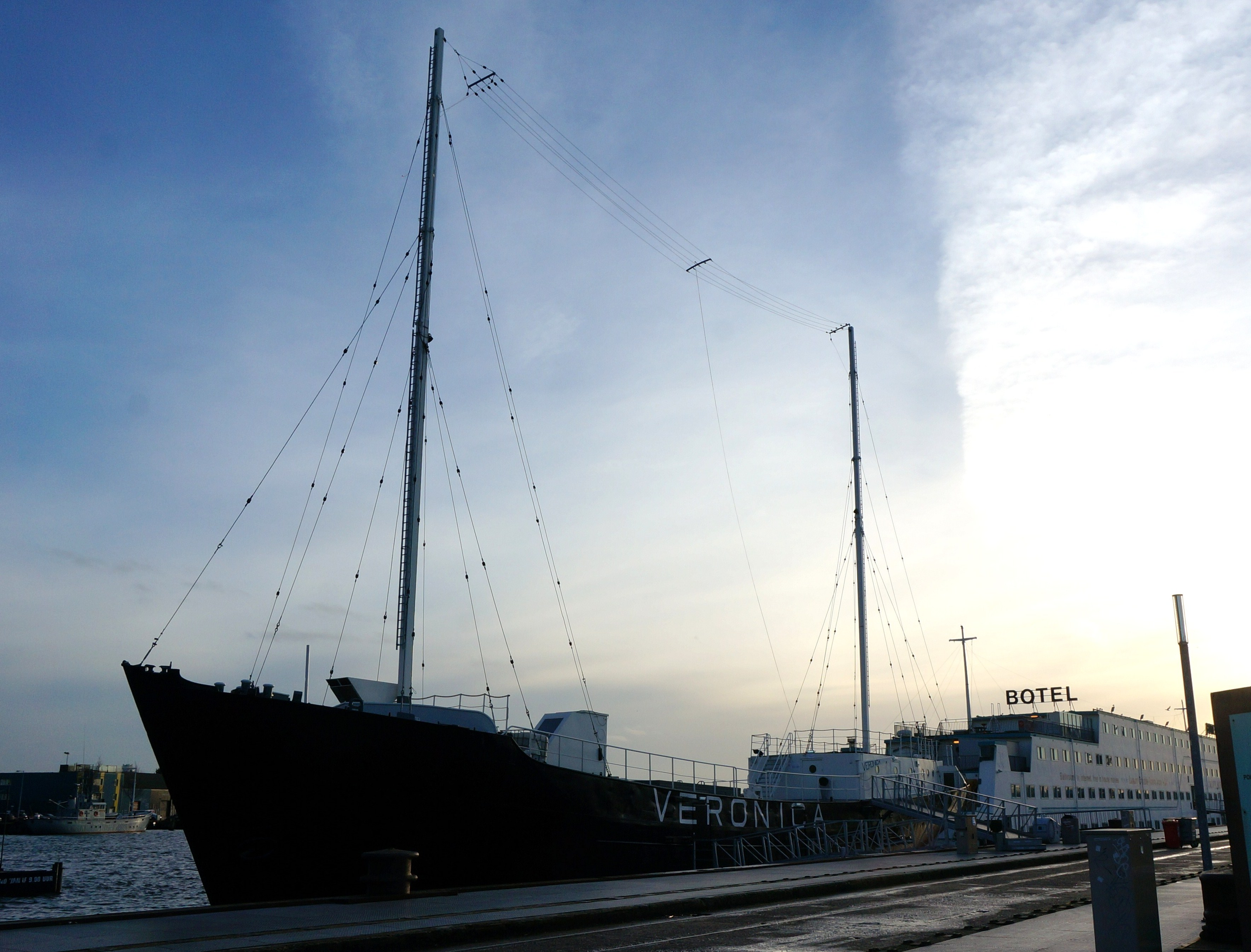
MV Norderney in the port of Amsterdam, 2013

Although all transmissions had ended, Norderney remained at sea. While the VOO was applying to enter the Dutch public broadcasting domain speculations were made that Veronica would come back from the ship one way or the other.

On 11 August 1975, nearly a year after the last transmission, Norderney was towed into the harbour of IJmuiden. Most of the former Veronica DJ's and director Bull Verweij. The ship moored in Amsterdam until 28 August 1975.

In Zaandam, and later Dordrecht, the ship was initially adapted to become a museum - but she ended up as a disco club and over the years she was used as a nightclub in different places around the country.

In 1990 the public broadcaster VOO hired the ship to celebrate "30 years Veronica" and she was used for one day anchored off the coast of Scheveningen as a platform for live radio and TV programmes. In 1994, 20 years after the closure of the offshore radio transmissions the VOO left the public broadcasting domain and went commercial again

In 1999 the last day of the old pirate station was relived, 25 years after the day the offshore station ended transmissions.
