= Arend Langenberg =

Dutch voice-over, voice actor and radio presenter

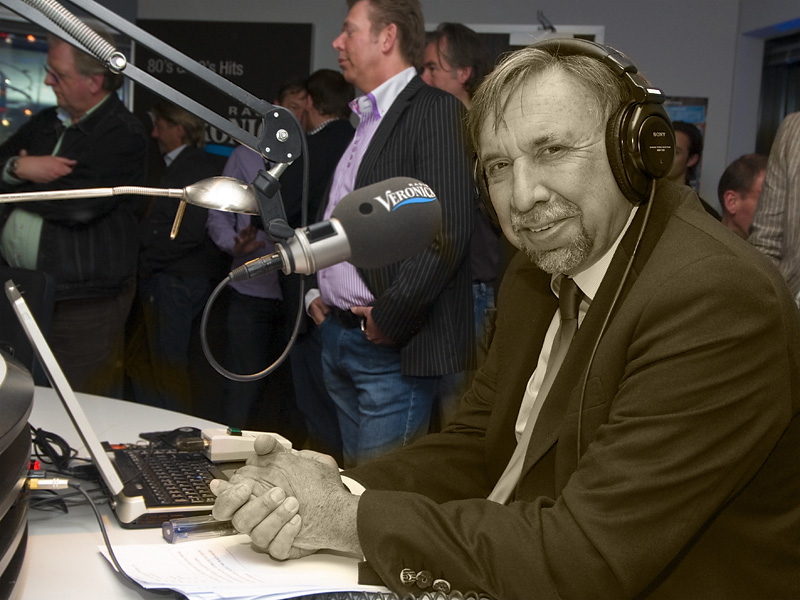
- Born: 19 January 1949; Amsterdam, Netherlands
- Died: 30 December 2012 (aged 63); Amsterdam, Netherlands
- Occupations: Voice-over; Voice actor Radio presenter
- Years active: 1970–2012
- Employer(s): Radio Veronica; Algemeen Nederlands Persbureau; 538; Classic FM; Sky Radio; Peter R. de Vries: Crime Reporter
- Call sign: The Voice

Arend Willem Langenberg (19 January 1949 – 30 December 2012) was a Dutch voice-over, voice actor and radio presenter. He died at the age of 63 from colon cancer.

== Early life ==
Arend Langenberg began his career in November 1970 at the offshore station Radio Veronica, a station that stopped broadcasting in 1974. He continued his career as news anchor by the news agency ANP that broadcast on Hilversum I, II and III at that time. After this, he was to transition to the NOB to head the gramophone library. At the weekend, he kept the news on Radio 538 and Sky Radio. A while later, he picked up again fanatically on the new reading and he found himself at the head of the news department at the Sky Radio Group. By Classic FM, it was at this time next station which he can be heard as a presenter. In 2003 he signed an exclusive contract with Sky Radio, which he could no longer work for Radio 538, that station started an own news service.

Besides radio duties conferred Langenberg his voice to several other programs and commercials, including the program Peter R. de Vries, crime reporter. In 2009 he worked as the famous newscaster in the feature film Sinterklaas en de Verdwenen Pakjesboot director Martijn van Nellestijn.

== Disease and death ==
In early 2008 it was announced that he was suffering from Colorectal cancer; at the end of 2008 he continues his work again. He died on 30 December 2012, and was buried on 4 January 2013.
