= Pirate radio in the Middle East =

Unlicensed radio stations in the Middle East

== Israel (from territorial waters) ==
All of the offshore stations broadcasting to Israel were operating from within Israeli territorial waters under a strange arrangement that attempted to prevent intrusion by terrorists on the one hand, while turning a blind eye to the illegality of the offshore broadcasting operations taking place on board the anchored ships.

- 1973

Voice of Peace in Hebrew, Arabic and English aboard the MV Peace - created with the aim of promoting peace in the Middle East. The station was generally tolerated by the Israeli Government and it was intentionally sunk in international waters on November 28, 1993, following the signing of the Oslo Peace Accords which it was thought was validation of its mission.

- 1981

TV Odelia transmitting from the ship MV Odelia - anchored off the coast of Tel Aviv.

- 1988

Arutz Sheva in Hebrew, English and other languages from the MV Hatzvi at anchorage off the coast of Tel Aviv.

- 1991

Radio One broadcasting from the MV Air anchored off Haifa. The station was eventually given a license in 1995 to broadcast from within Israel.

- 1993

Radio Hof aboard the MV Hof.

- 1995

Radio Dan aboard the MV Kajun, anchored off the coast of Tel Aviv.

== Israel (land based) ==
A number of pirate radio stations operated within Israel on the FM band in the mid 1990s. These included:

In Tel Aviv area

- Radio Active
- Radio Center
- Radio Gal
- Radio Kol Ha'ir

Other regions

- Radio Briza, in Haifa area
- Radio Ramat Gan, Ramat Gan
- Kol Ha Mizrah, Northern Israel and Jerusalem.
