= Free Radio Santa Cruz =

Unlicensed community radio station in Santa Cruz, California, United States

FRSC
- United States
- Broadcast area: Santa Cruz, California
- Frequencies: 101.3 (MHz) (formerly 101.1 MHz, 96.3MHz and 89.3MHz)
- Branding: Free Radio Santa Cruz

Programming
- Format: Freeform

Ownership
- Owner: The Free Radio Santa Cruz Collective

History
- First air date: Spring 1995

Technical information
- Class: Pirate
- ERP: 200 watts
- Transmitter coordinates: 36°58′05″N 122°01′54″W

Links
- Website: freakradio.org

Free Radio Santa Cruz (FRSC) is an unlicensed radio station in Santa Cruz, California, United States. Founded by activists Skidmarkbob Bob, Phil Free and Dennis Davey. The station has been on the air since Spring, 1995; its broadcast content is a mix of daily news, music, and cultural programs, produced both locally and nationally.

Because FRSC does not have a license from the Federal Communications Commission (FCC), the station is in open violation of US federal regulations. Free Radio Santa Cruz allows individuals in the community to have their own shows, and encourages participation through donations, membership in the broadcasting collective, and calling in live during shows.

On September 29, 2004, the station was raided by agents of the FCC, backed by federal marshals armed with assault rifles. No arrests were made, but the agents shut down the station and seized nearly all of the equipment, including the transmitter, computers, mixing boards, microphones, headphones, CD players, and CDs.

However, with a strong showing of community support, the station was streaming online again within 48 hours and transmitting at 101.1 FM less than a month after the raid. FRSC continues to stream and broadcast 24 hours a day. As of October 2011, the station is broadcasting on 101.3 MHz.

== List of Current Programming ==
- Democracy Now
- Hour of Slack
- Lava Lamps & 8-Track Theatre
- The Mind's Ear
- Music in the Mail
- R Duck Show
- Lost at Sea
- The Gist of Justynn Tyme
