= Tineke de Nooij =

Dutch radio and television presenter (born 1941)

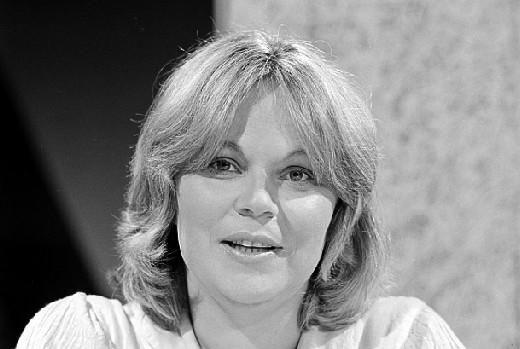

Christina Hendrika (Tineke) de Nooij (born 27 April 1941 in Baarn) is a Dutch radio and television presenter.

== Career ==
She worked for Radio Veronica, later Veronica Omroep Organisatie since the early 1960s. She hosted the TinekeShow on TV in her heydays, and continued this on Radio 5.

She started at 12 years on the AVRO radio program for Boy and Girl Scouts "Hoort zegt het voort".
In 2016 she won the Marconi Oeuvre Award. The motivation for the award was that she is a pioneer of Dutch radio, who "showed that to present radio shows is not a job but a way of life".
