= Radio Veronica =

Coordinates: 51°13′55″N 4°24′58″E

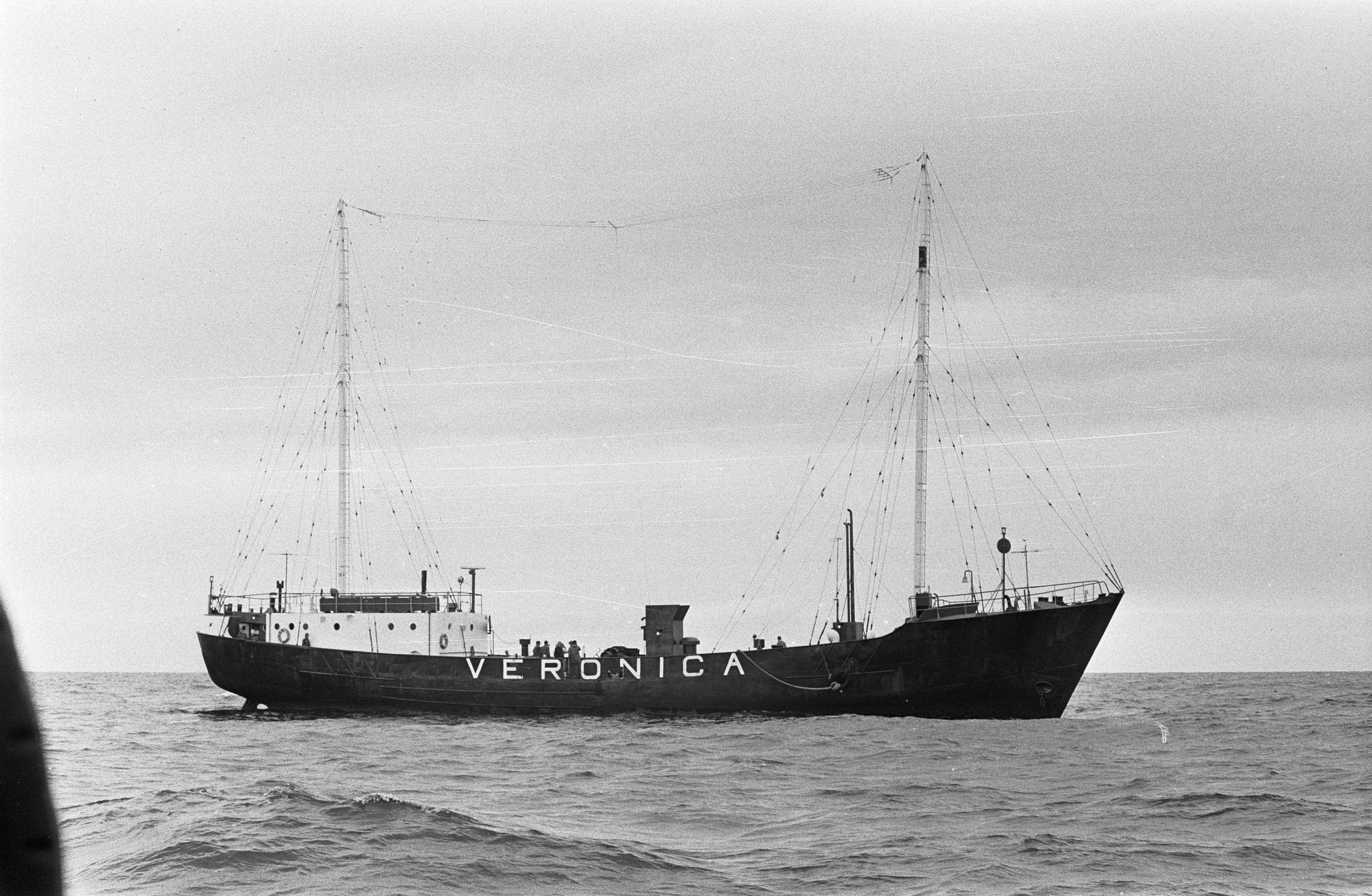
- Netherlands
- Broadcast area: Netherlands
- Frequencies: 192 meters (1562 kHz) (1960–1972); 538 meters (557 kHz) (1972–1974)

Programming
- Format: Adult Contemporary

History
- First air date: 6 May 1960
- Last air date: 31 August 1974

Radio Veronica was an offshore radio station that began broadcasting in 1960, and was on air for over fourteen years. It was set up by independent radio, TV and household electrical retailers in the Netherlands, to stimulate the sales of radio receivers by providing an alternative to the Netherlands state-licensed stations in Hilversum.

Test transmissions began in Amsterdam on 16 December 1959. Test broadcasts on Borkum Riff began on 18 or 21 April 1960. Regular broadcasts began on 6 May 1960. The station first named itself as VRON (Vrije Radio Omroep Nederland; Free Radio Station [of the] Netherlands) but later changed to Radio Veronica, after the poem "Het Zwarte Schaap Veronica" — The Black Sheep Veronica — by the children's poet Annie M. G. Schmidt.

After the station's closure, some of its staff applied for a broadcasting licence and continued as a legal organisation with the same name.

The original Radio Veronica became the most popular station in the Netherlands. It broadcast from a former lightship Borkum Riff, anchored off the Dutch coastline. The ship was fitted with a horizontal antenna between the fore and aft masts, fed by a one-kilowatt transmitter. Most of its programmes were recorded in a studio on the Zeedijk in Hilversum. At the end of the 1960s, the studios and offices moved to bigger premises on the Utrechtseweg in Hilversum. Initially, advertisers were reluctant to buy airtime, but those that did reported increases in sales and the station's revenue improved gradually.

For a short time, the station also ran an English language service under the call letters CNBC (Commercial Neutral Broadcasting Company) not related to CNBC or NBC. Although short-lived, CNBC was presented by professional broadcasters who were able to give invaluable technical advice to Veronica's Dutch staff.

== Expansion and competition ==
The station faced its first serious competition in 1964 when Radio Noordzee and TV Noordzee began broadcasting from the REM Island, an artificial structure. The Dutch government passed a law banning broadcasts from such structures and raided the REM Island, but left Veronica alone because of its popularity.

In August 1964, the station acquired a new ship, a converted fishing trawler named MV Norderney, and equipped it with a more efficient antenna and a 10 kilowatt transmitter, as well as an anchor designed to keep it correctly oriented. The Norderney took over Veronica's broadcasts in November that year and the Borkum Riff was sold for scrap.

During 1965, the station was influenced by English-language pirates like Radio London and adopted a faster format with jingles. When another UK pirate, Swinging Radio England, went bankrupt, it was briefly replaced by two Dutch-language successors, Radio Dolfijn and then Radio 227, which targeted Veronica's audiences, but competition was short-lived because of the British Marine Broadcasting Offences Act 1967 which had closed most of the similar British stations by August 1967.

== Veronica versus RNI ==
The arrival of a more powerful rival was to cause repercussions for Veronica. Radio Nordsee International (RNI), owned by two Swiss businessmen, initially broadcast German and English programmes from its ship MV Mebo II anchored off the Dutch Coast. It moved to the British coast in early 1970 but was jammed by the British government. The jamming stopped when the ship returned to the Netherlands, taking up position just 1 mile (1,600 m) from the Norderney. The German language programmes were subsequently replaced by all-English programmes.

The Mebo II was equipped with a 100 kW AM transmitter as well as FM and shortwave equipment. Although power did not guarantee RNI an audience, Radio Veronica's management were sufficiently worried about loss of advertising revenue that they planned to put RNI off the air.

RNI closed on 24 September 1970, claiming it was trying to stop the Dutch government from passing legislation that might force Veronica, "so dearly loved by the peoples of the Netherlands", to close. In fact, Veronica had paid RNI 1 million guilders to go off the air for two months and, to enforce that agreement, Veronica replaced the Mebo II's crew with their own staff.

RNI's management became unhappy with that arrangement and, once the two months were up, one of RNI's Swiss directors, Erwin Bollier, attempted to refund the money. Veronica refused, claiming the right to renew the contract. On 5 January 1971, Bollier boarded the Mebo II, dismissed the Veronica-appointed captain, and took command himself. It was claimed that Veronica's staff had sabotaged RNI's equipment but, by February 1971, RNI was back on the air, with a Dutch as well as an English service. In March, Veronica sued RNI for breach of contract. The court found in favour of RNI and the case tarnished Veronica's reputation.

Worse was to come. On the night of 15 May 1971, three men in a rubber dinghy started a fire on the Mebo II which damaged the stern. RNI broadcast mayday calls. All on board were rescued and the fire was extinguished. The studios and transmitters were undamaged and RNI went back on the air the following morning. On 17 May 1971, Veronica's advertising director Norbert Jurgens was arrested and, on the following day, Veronica's director Bull Verweij was also arrested. In a television interview, Verweij claimed he had paid a man to tow the Mebo II into Dutch waters so that the ship would be seized. Verweij denied any intention of endangering the lives of RNI's crew but was found guilty, together with Jurgens and the crew of the dinghy. All five were sentenced to a year in prison. The damage to Veronica's reputation was incalculable and, just as the 1966 Radio City shooting had motivated the British government to pass anti-pirate legislation, the RNI fire similarly motivated the Dutch authorities.

Both Veronica and RNI continued to broadcast without further incident but, as the Government began to draw up plans for anti-pirate legislation, the two stations began to campaign against it.

In September 1972, the two radio ships were joined by Radio Caroline's MV Mi Amigo, which anchored between the Norderney and Mebo II.

== Frequency change and RNI2 ==
Veronica had been experiencing interference on 1562 kHz (192 m) from the Beromünster transmitter in Switzerland. Originally allocated 10 kW on that frequency, Beromünster had upgraded to 160 kW and was planning 300 kW. Veronica had been considering a new frequency since the late 1960s, and the threat of increased interference made a change imperative.

At noon on 30 September 1972, Veronica broadcast a half-hour retrospective documentary. The station then closed at 12:30 pm, a time chosen to symbolise the station's 12½ years on the air, announcing it would reopen at 1:00 pm on its new frequency of 557 kHz (538 m).

A moment after Veronica went off the air, listeners heard RNI's theme tune on 1562 kHz. RNI DJ Tony Allan, in Dutch, thanked Veronica for its 12½ years of broadcasting and reminded listeners of Veronica's new frequency, then welcomed them to the new sound of "RNI 2". RNI's management claimed the new service had been launched to prove that RNI could broadcast additional frequencies in case of emergency, but it was widely seen by listeners as a tongue-in-cheek rivalry aimed at poaching Veronica's listeners.

Veronica returned to the air on 557 kHz as scheduled, and listeners in the Netherlands and Belgium reported improved reception. On the same day, the Mi Amigo began test transmissions in preparation for Radio Caroline's return. RNI 2 broadcast for a few days and then went off the air.

Radio Veronica broadcast a top 40 format during the daytime, but in the evenings and late at night some specialist shows were aired, some in Indonesian. Following its move to 538 metres, Veronica became known for its well-crafted jingles and commercials. News summaries were broadcast each hour, at 2 minutes before the hour.

== 1973–1974: Co-operation and rivalry ==
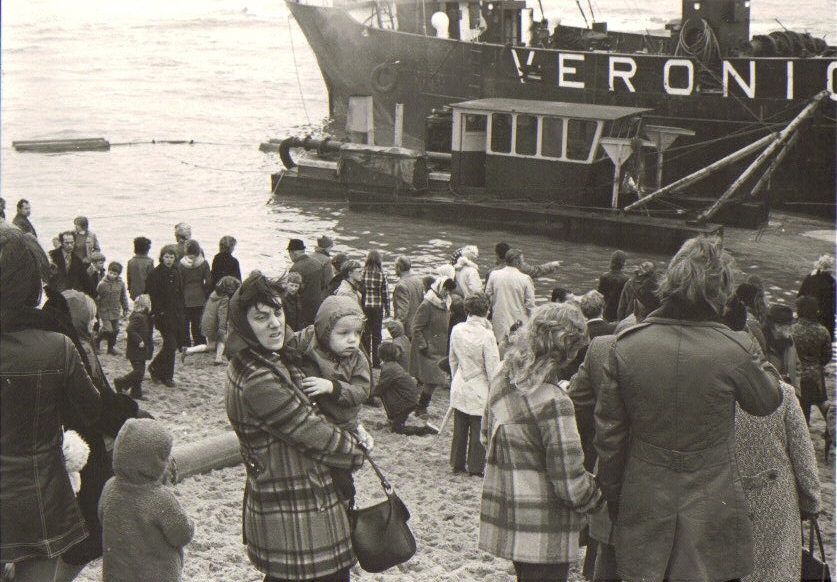
Veronica ship "The Norderney", Scheveningen, 7 April 1973

As the Dutch government drew up its legislation, Veronica organised a major rally that was due to take place in The Hague on 18 April 1973, and planned to broadcast special programmes in support. However, on 2 April the Norderney lost its anchor in a storm and ran aground on Scheveningen beach. The ship suffered no serious damage and the crew were taken ashore safely, but it seemed unlikely that the ship could be refloated in time for the rally. RNI offered its facilities, but Veronica refused because of the bad blood between them. Caroline, although off the air with technical problems, also made an offer and Veronica accepted.

Working around the clock, Caroline's technicians put the Mi Amigo back on the air on 11 April 1973, transmitting Radio Veronica programmes on Caroline's frequency of 1187 kHz (253 metres, announced as 259). Meanwhile, work on refloating the Norderney continued. This took several days, but the ship was back at sea on 18 April and soon returned to the air. Thereafter the Mi Amigo relayed Veronica programmes from the Norderney for a few days.

In the summer of 1973 Britain's Independent Broadcasting Authority began test transmissions on 557 kHz from an antenna at Lots Road Power Station in west London, and in October 1973 Capital Radio was launched on the same frequency. These broadcasts caused serious interference to Veronica in Britain and Belgium, although Dutch listeners were largely unaffected.

Meanwhile, Caroline, which had helped Veronica in April 1973, offered it new rivalry in July, in the form of Belgian millionaire Adriaan van Landschoot and his Radio Atlantis, which hired airtime on the Mi Amigo. This lasted until October. Radio Atlantis subsequently resumed broadcasting from its own ship, while a new Dutch / Flemish station Radio Mi Amigo was launched on 1 January 1974 from the Mi Amigo .

== Final broadcast ==
Despite all the pro-Veronica campaigning, the Dutch government passed its anti-pirate legislation and announced that the law was to come into effect on 1 September 1974. Veronica chose to close down at 6:00 pm on 31 August 1974. The final hour was, like most of Veronica's programmes, pre-recorded in the station's studios in Hilversum. However, the station's final news bulletin was read live from the news studio on board the MV Norderney. A number of the station's directors, including Bull Verweij and his brother Jaap, were on board the ship during the final hour, as were many of the staff. In his final speech DJ Rob Out said "Part of the democracy in the Netherlands is dying with the closure of Radio Veronica and that is a tragedy for the country". Following the Dutch National Anthem, a Veronica jingle was played and the transmitter was switched off halfway through. Photos of the scene in the studio show workers openly weeping.

Radio Atlantis and RNI also closed on the evening of 31 August 1974. Radio Caroline had already decided to continue, as it had in 1967 (although as a precaution the ship moved to a new anchorage to reduce the likelihood of a "raid" by Dutch authorities), and after some debate, Radio Mi Amigo also decided to stay on the air. After Veronica's closure, Radio Mi Amigo "borrowed" many of Veronica's programming formats.

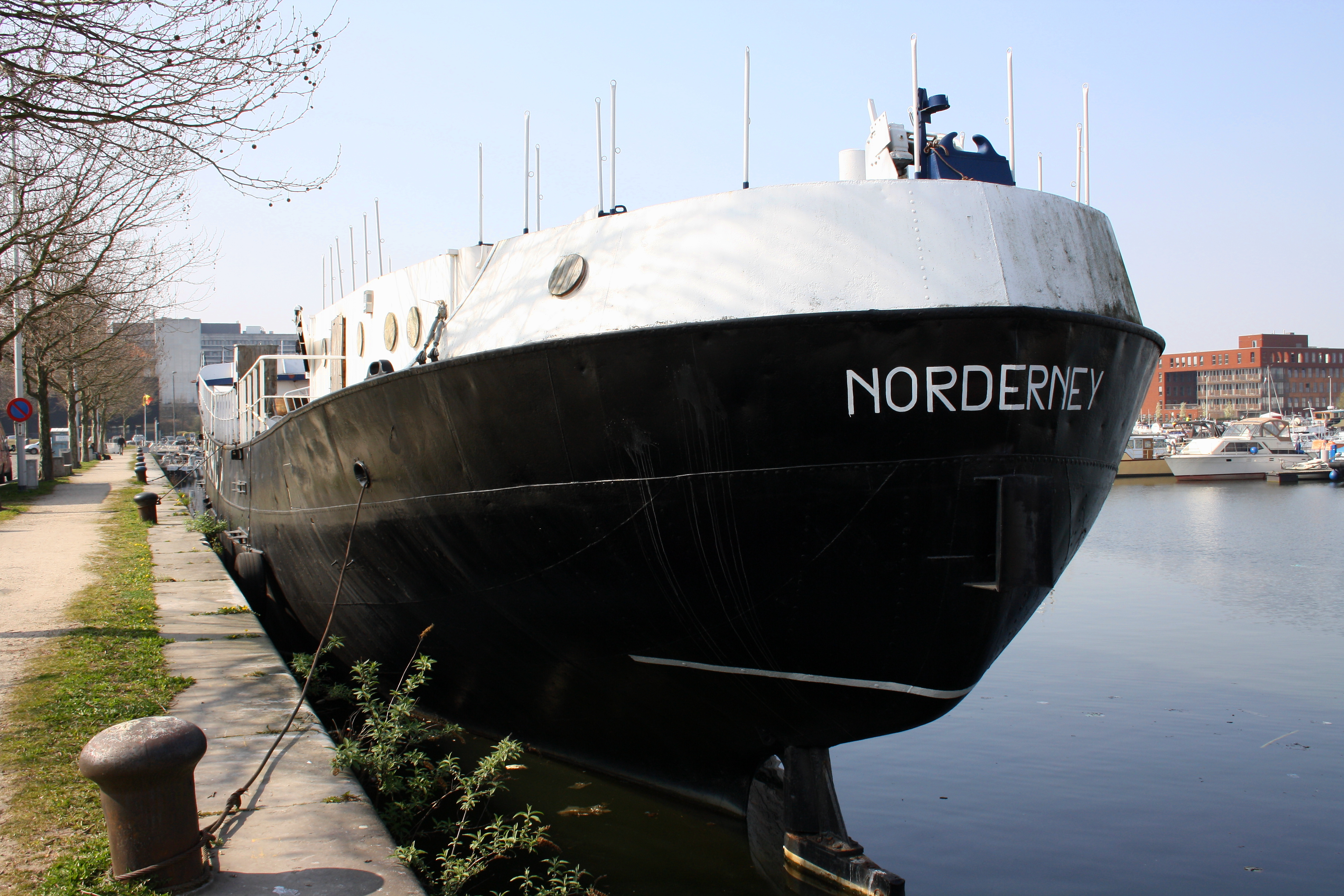
Norderney - Antwerp, 2011

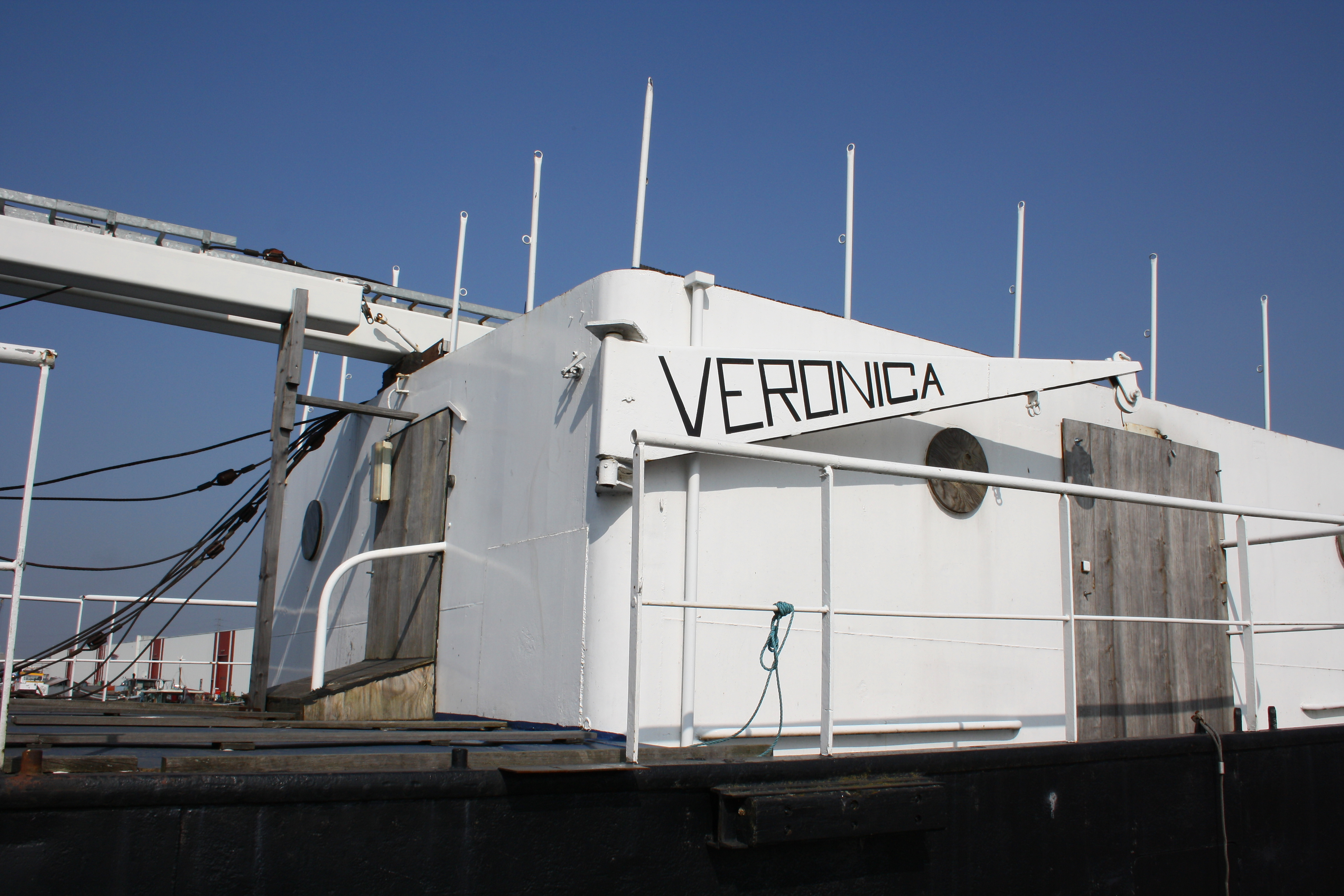

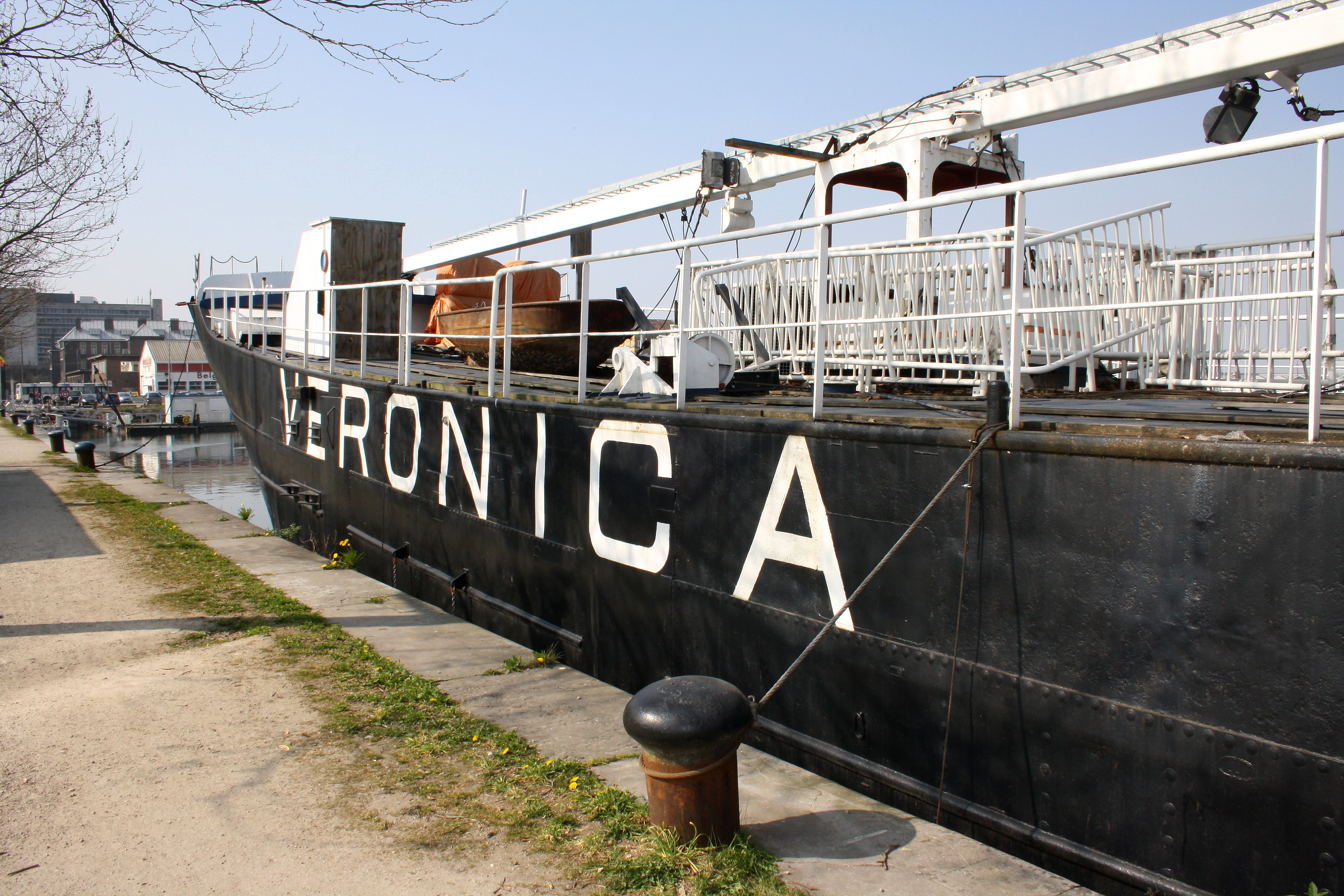

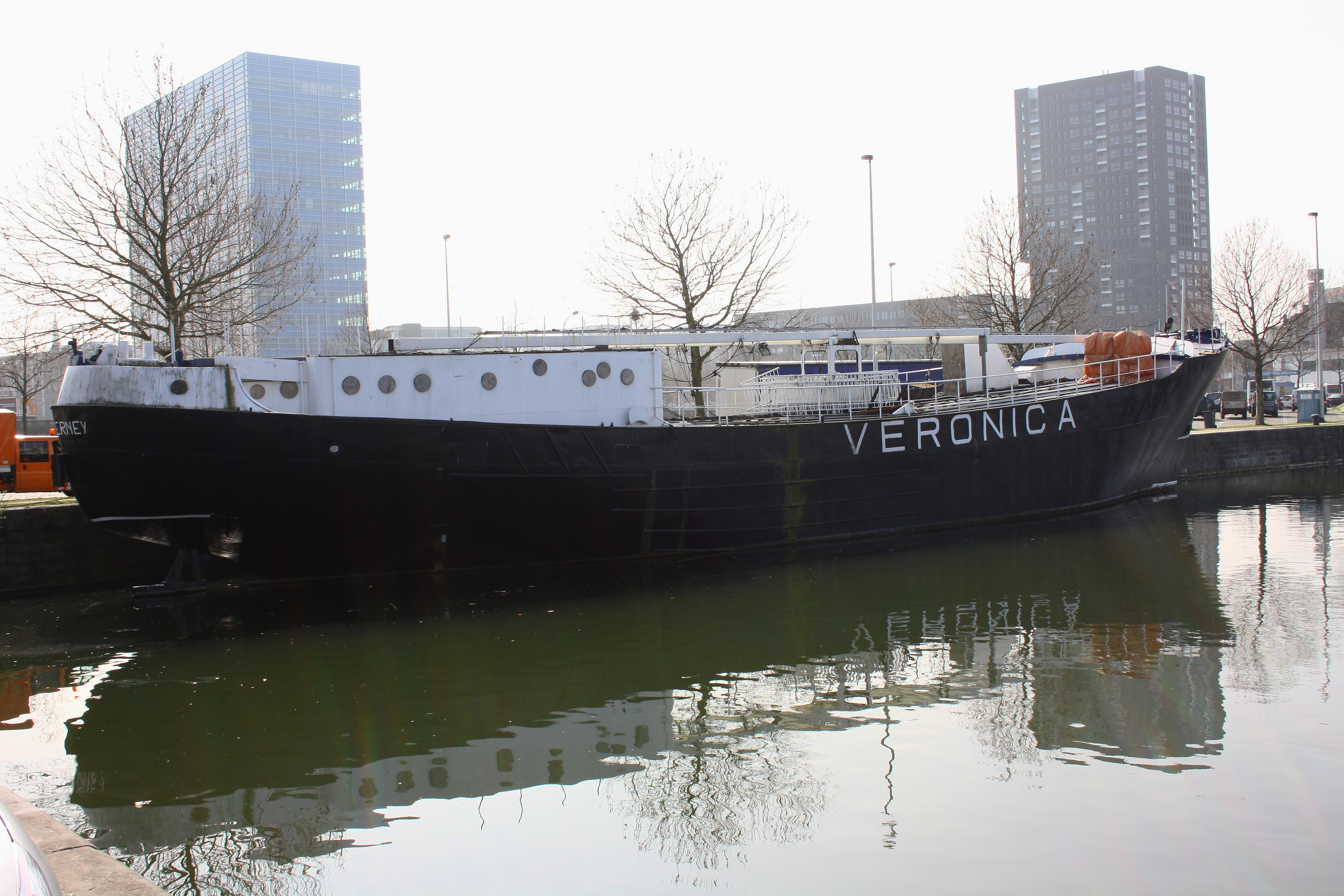

== Veronica applies for legal status ==
After 1974 some of Veronica's staff set up the Veronica Broadcasting Organisation (in Dutch Veronica Omroep Organisatie, abbreviated as VOO) in the hopes of applying for a broadcasting license. After some bureaucratic obstruction, which one critic described as a mini-Watergate, the VOO was finally granted a licence and was invited to open the new Hilversum 4 radio network on 28 December 1975. Hilversum 4 was a classical music service, and the irony was not lost on Veronica, which began its first legal programme by "accidentally" playing a snatch of The Beatles' "Long Tall Sally" instead of the announced classical piece.

Beginning in 1975, the VOO was part of the Dutch State broadcasting System, but in 1995 Veronica formed a joint-venture with CLT to create the new Holland Media Groep and became a commercial independent broadcasting station in the Netherlands. This ended in 2001; in 2000 it sold its shares. After two years of negotiations, the television station V8 began broadcasting as Veronica TV on 20 September 2003. Starting on 31 August 2003, the radio station became part of the Sky Radio Group, where it currently remains. Lex Harding and Erik de Zwart also founded the station Radio 538 in 1992, referring to the former wavelength of the offshore Radio Veronica.

== Radio Veronica deejays ==
DJs on Radio Veronica included:

- Ad Bouman
- Bart van Leeuwen (presenter)
- Hans Mondt
- Jan van Veen
- Joost den Draaier
- Sandman
- Lex Harding
- Stan Haag (presenter)
- Tineke de Nooij
- Tom Collins (presenter)
- Will Luikinga

== News anchors ==
- Arend Langenberg
- Harmen Siezen
- Jan van Veen

== See also ==
- List of radio stations in the Netherlands
- Radio Veronica (Sky Radio), the current station with the same name.
