= Pirate radio in Europe =

Unlicensed radio stations in Europe

Pirate radio in Europe emerged as unlicensed radio broadcasting stations, often operating from offshore vessels or undisclosed land-based locations. The phenomenon began in the mid-20th century and became widespread in the 1960s and 1970s, gaining popularity in countries such as Denmark, the Netherlands and the United Kingdom. Offering alternative music and content across the British Isles and continental Europe, pirate radio challenged government control of the airwaves in the region until changes in legislation either legalised or shut down these stations. Despite suppression, pirate radio left a lasting cultural impact on European broadcasting.

== Denmark ==
Radio Mercur began transmission from the MV Cheeta on 2 August 1958. Danmarks Commercielle Radio (DCR) began transmission from the MV Lucky Star on 15 September 1961. DCR later united with Radio Mercur. Radio Mercur ended transmission in 1962 due to a Danish law prohibiting assistance to illegal broadcasting directed to a Danish audience.

Pirat radio 69 was located in the activist house "Ungdomshuset" in Copenhagen from 14 December 2006 to 1 March 2007.

In 2012, Byens Radio started broadcasting in central, north and south Copenhagen with micro-powered radio equipment, inspired by Mbanna Kantako and his family from humanrightsradio.net in Springfield, Illinois. The station went on a week-long break starting mid-February 2012 after a detection van was spotted near the broadcasting site. The left-wing activist website Modkraft.dk had evidence that Byens Radio broadcast from 31 December 2011. The police's detection van never got close enough to stop the actual broadcasting, but led the activist group behind the station to move the broadcasting site elsewhere in order to avoid eviction. By moving from one base to another several times, the broadcasters were never found. Many newspaper articles and web sites document its existence and some of the original broadcasting is represented online. Byens Radio resumed transmission on 4 November 2013.

== France ==
The first wave of French pirate radio was a political movement based mainly within French territory, including Radio Verte, Radio Ivre, Radio Active and Radio Lorraine Coeur d'Acier. Most of these stations were short-lived; some, such as Radio Verte Fessenheim, became licensed stations.

In January 1978, the DST arrested eleven people accused of radio piracy. In May, President Valéry Giscard d'Estaing asked the government to put an end to pirate radio stations. On 17 May, the Lecat law confirmed the monopoly of state radio stations and toughened the penalties for offenders.

The socialist opposition supported the fight of free radio stations for freedom of expression without promising the end of the monopoly. François Mitterrand was elected president in 1981; the law on audiovisual communication, passed on 29 July 1982, abolished the state monopoly and authorized free radio. In February 1983, 22 stations obtained authorization to broadcast in Paris.

The High Authority for Audiovisual Communication was created in 1982, replaced in 1986 by the National Commission for Communication and Liberties (CNCL). The frequency authorizations issued by the CNCL in 1987 were the subject of several scandals, over the authorization of several commercial stations to the detriment of free radios and non-commercial associative radios, and the lack of transparency in the choice of frequencies. A small associative station, Radio Laser, one of the radio stations excluded, initiated a lawsuit against Radio Courtoisie for "active corruption" of the CNCL, and the members of the CNCL were at the same time prosecuted for "confiscation". Weakened by these controversies, the CNCL was replaced in 1989 by the Superior Council of the Audiovisual which gained increased competences, a greater independence of action over regulation and the allocation of frequencies, and better legal support to apply these decisions.

== Ireland ==
Pirate radio in Ireland has a long history, with hundreds of pirate radio stations having operated within the country. Due to past lax enforcement of the rules, the lack of commercial radio until 1989, and the small physical size of the country, pirate radio stations proliferated for a number of years. A small number of stations also attempted television broadcasts although most of these ventures were short-lived.

== Netherlands ==
Radio Veronica began transmitting in Dutch in April 1960 on AM mediumwave (192 meter, 1562 kHz; later 538 meter, 557 kHz) from the MV Borkum Riff, and after 1965 from the MV Norderney, in international waters off the coast of Scheveningen, and soon became the most popular radio station in the Netherlands. Broadcasts were targeted to the Netherlands only, and transmitting power was deliberately kept moderate to avoid interference with international radio stations. Most broadcasts were recorded on shore in Hilversum. The station operated until August 1974, when the Dutch ratification of the Strasbourg treaty came into effect, after which Radio Veronica—then called VOO—became part of the regular Dutch broadcasting system. Radio Veronica is now an independent radio station.

From 1964, Radio Noordzee and TV Noordzee transmitted in Dutch from REM Island, an artificial construction resembling an early offshore oil platform. It was built in Ireland and towed into a position off the coast of the Netherlands, where it was assembled on site. The two stations were short lived and were forcibly closed by an air and sea attack by the Dutch Armed Forces. However, the funds solicited from the project by the REM island project were later used to launch a legitimate and fully licensed station in the Netherlands.

In 1970, Radio Noordzee Internationaal (RNI) began broadcasting on AM, FM and international shortwave from the MV Mebo II, originally anchored off the Netherlands. The ship moved for some time off the coast of south-eastern England, where it was jammed by a Royal Navy transmitter, before returning to the Netherlands. The owners of the MV Mebo II eventually sold their offshore station to Libya as a revolutionary radio station. In the end Libya blew the vessel up and sank it for target practice.

Other pirate stations broadcasting to the Netherlands included Capital Radio (1970, aboard the MV King David), Radio Delmare (1978, aboard the MV Martina), Radio Monique (1984-1987, aboard Radio Caroline's MV Ross Revenge), and Radio 558/819 (1988-1989, aboard the MV Ross Revenge).

There are still many Dutch pirate radio stations, mostly located in rural areas. It has been claimed that in 2011 approximately 50% of all European pirate stations are located in the East-Netherlands, especially in the provinces of Overijssel, Friesland and Drenthe, as well as western Brabant. Most of the pirate radio stations broadcast so-called "pirate music": traditional Dutch folk music combined with classic English, German and Polka. Most operate on FM, but some can be found on AM, particularly 1611 to 1701 kHz. Like many other European countries, another hotspot is the 48 meter-band on Shortwave radio, frequency 6200-6500 kHz.

== Sweden ==
From the early 1950s until 31 May 1952, a station called Black Peter was run by the brothers John and Gunnar Figaro from their home in Lomsjö, a small village in southern Lappland. They were suspected of transmitting information from espionage, resulting in a major hunt.

From 1958, Skånes Radio Mercur, later renamed Radio Syd, broadcast from the MV Cheeta and later the MV Cheeta II, which was also used at various times by TV Syd and Radio Caroline South, while the ship was anchored off south-east England. Radio Syd was shut down in January 1966, and its owner, Britt Wadner, moved to Gambia, where she launched a land-based Radio Syd in May 1970 using the antenna from Cheeta II.

In 1961, Radio Nord began broadcasting in Swedish from the MV Bon Jour (later renamed Magda Maria and Mi Amigo). This station was the behind-the-scenes creation of American Top 40 broadcast pioneer Gordon McLendon and Clint Murchison, owner of the Dallas Cowboys, both from Dallas, Texas. As the MV Mi Amigo, this radio ship would later be used to transmit under the names of Radio 199, Radio Veronica, Radio Atlantis, Radio Seagull, Radio Mi Amigo, and Radio Caroline.

== United Kingdom ==
Pirate radio has been a popular and enduring radio medium in the UK since the 1960s, despite expansions in licensed broadcasting, and the advent of both digital radio and internet radio. Although it peaked throughout the 1960s and again during the 1980s/1990s, it remains in existence today. Having moved from transmitting from ships at sea to tower blocks across British towns and cities, in 2009 the UK broadcasting regulator Ofcom estimated more than 150 pirate radio stations were still operating.
