= Bluecrest =

Bluecrest may refer to:

- BlueCrest Capital Management, a hedge fund which also operates under related names
- Bluecrest University College and Bluecrest College in Ghana
- Bluecrest Wellness, a health screening company
- Bluecrest, a predecessor of Young's Seafood
