= Daisy de Galard =

French journalist and television producer (1929–2007)

- Born: Marguerite de Gourcuff; 4 November 1929; Tendron, Cher, France
- Died: 6 January 2007 (aged 77); Boulogne-Billancourt, France
- Education: École supérieure de journalisme de Paris
- Occupations: Journalist, television producer
- Spouse: Olivier Guichard (m. 1990; died 2004)

Daisy de Galard (4 November 1929 – 6 January 2007) was a French journalist and television producer.

After graduating from the École supérieure de journalisme de Paris, when it was uncommon for a female to be a journalist, De Galard was hired by Hélène Gordon-Lazareff to work for Elle magazine. She was the editor from 1972 to 1975.

De Galard also created the television show Dim Dam Dom.

She was a board member of National Commission for Communication and Liberties from 1986 to 1989 and then Conseil supérieur de l'audiovisuel from 1989 to 1995.

In 1978, De Galard was awarded the Legion of Honour.

== Biography ==
One of the few women to graduate from the École supérieure de journalisme de Paris at the time, she was recruited by Hélène Gordon-Lazareff and joined the women's magazine Elle in 1952. She cut her teeth writing about a variety of topics, then took charge of the “Échos de la semaine” column. She was Editor-in-chief from 1972 to 1975.

Alongside her journalistic work, from 1965 to 1971 she produced the monthly television program Dim Dam Dom on ORTF's second channel, with photographers Fouli Elia and Peter Knapp, and journalist Michel Polac as part of her team.She went on to present the programs Cinémalice and Cinéastes de leurs temps. In August 1976, she was appointed for a three-year term as an expert member of the Haut Conseil de l'audiovisuel (French Broadcasting Authority).

She became a member of the TF1 Board of directors, then director at Gaumont, where she managed television productions, before founding her own production company, Angel International, in 1984.

Daisy de Galard was a member of the National Commission for Communication and Liberties (CNCL) from 1986 to 1989, then of its successor, the Audiovisual High Council (CSA), from 1989 to 1995. She was a member of the board of directors of Radio France from 1996 to 2006.

On August 18, 1956, she married journalist Hector de Galard (1921–1990). She married politician Olivier Guichard on July 27, 1990.

She was named a Knight of the Legion of Honour in 1978, then promoted to Officer in 2006.

She rests in the chapel of Fontenay, in Tendron.
