= Ross Group =

British food company

- Type: Private
- Industry: Fish processing
- Founded: 1920
- Founder: Thomas Ross
- Headquarters: Grimsby
- Area served: UK
- Products: Fish products

The Ross Group was a British food company founded in Grimsby, England, in 1920.

The Ross brand remains prominent in the retail frozen fish market. David Ross, the co-founder and significant shareholder in mobile telephone retailer The Carphone Warehouse, is the grandson of J Carl Ross.

Originally a small family-owned fish merchanting company, Ross diversified into trawling, fish processing, and later into food processing in general, expanding into factory farming to become the largest chicken producer in Europe by 1962 via a series of takeovers. The company bought out rival Young's in 1959 and, after a series of takeovers and mergers and de-mergers, forms part of what is now Young's Bluecrest, the UK's largest company in the frozen fish sector. The company's history is also Grimsby's industrial history.

Flag flown by trawlers of the Ross fleet

== History ==
=== Beginnings ===
The company was registered as Thomas Ross Ltd in 1920 in Grimsby. In 1929, Carl Ross became chairman and managing director when his father retired.

By the outbreak of World War II, Thomas Ross Ltd operated fish merchanting branches in Leeds, Leicester, and Fleetwood as well as its Grimsby base.

=== Trawling ===
Starting with a small fleet of four fishing vessels in the 1930s, Ross diversified into trawling from 1934. The acquisition of a major shareholding in Trawlers Grimsby in 1944 was followed by several other fishing fleets such as the Queen Steam Fishing Company. In 1956 Carl Ross took over GF Sleight Ltd, which employed 20 of the best trawler skippers in Britain, and began building trawlers in his latest acquisition – the Cochrane Shipyards of Selby. These were the famous 'Cat' and 'Bird' class trawlers. In 1960/1, the Ross Group took over the Rinovia Steam Fishing Company Ltd. At its peak the Group owned the largest fishing fleet in Europe, with eight trawler fleets. The company also acquired its own shipyard, which began building the company's vessels. In 1960, in England there were around 600 fishing trawlers. In the mid-1960s it had 65 vessels, the second largest fleet in England, after Associated Fisheries.

=== Fishing fleet ===
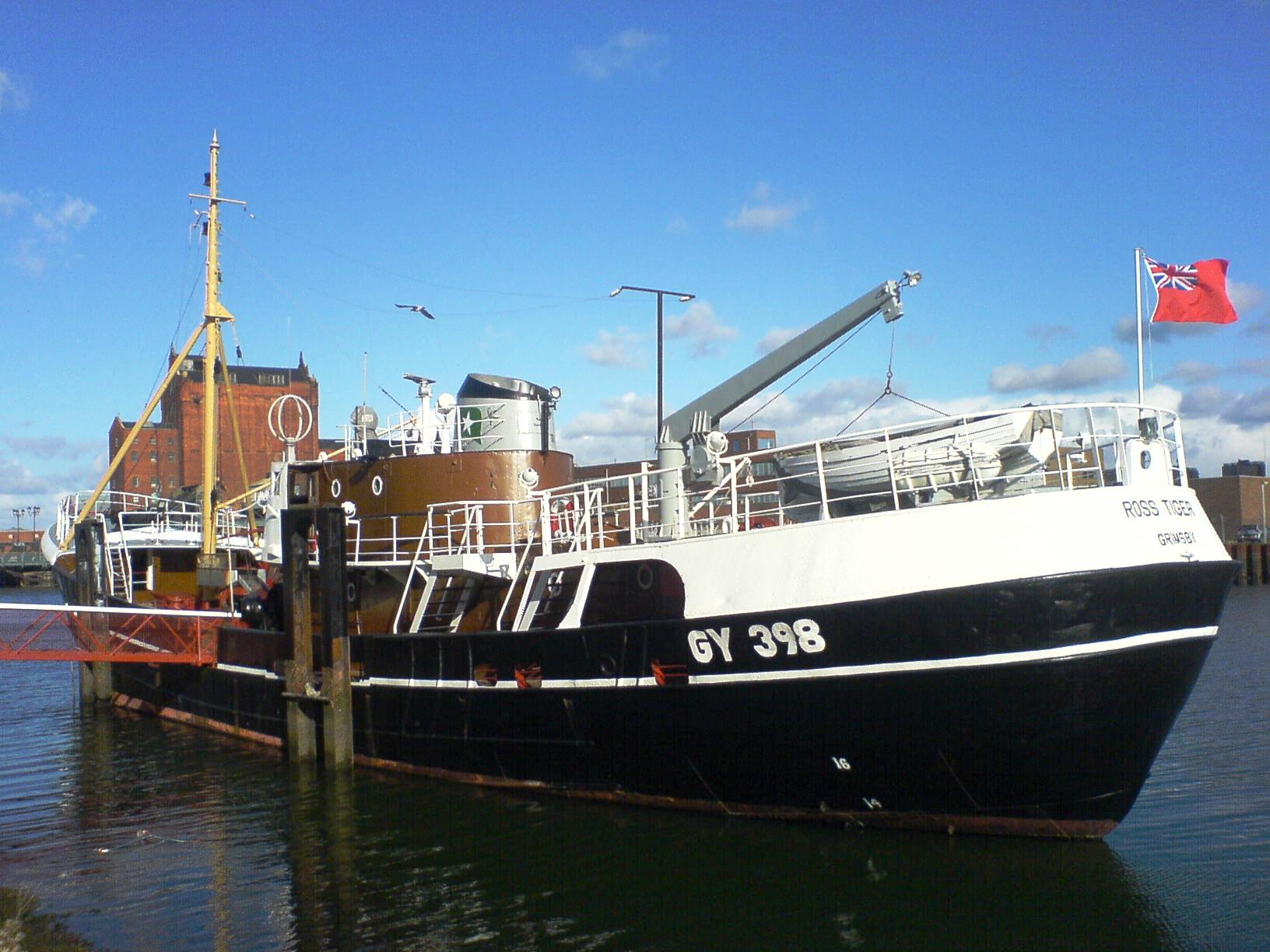
Ross Tiger

Ships in the Ross fleet included:

- Ross Tiger (February 1957 – Cat Class), first of the 'Cat Class' and preserved as a trawler at Grimsby's National Fishing Heritage Centre.
- Ross Leopard (October 1957 – Cat Class), in later years moored in the Thames and recently dismantled in Ostend, Belgium
- Ross Jaguar (December 1957 – Cat Class), converted into a three masted schooner with her name contracted to 'Jaguar'
- Ross Kashmir (1957 – K Class), later acquired much greater worldwide fame as a replacement for Greenpeace's 1955-built Rainbow Warrior, and became the Rainbow Warrior II in 1989.
- Ross Revenge (1960), later converted to a radio ship operated by Radio Caroline
- Ross Cleveland, involved in the Hull triple trawler tragedy
- Ross Cheater
- Ross Renown
- Ross Hawk
- Reperio
- Reboundo

=== Fish processing ===
In October 1953, George Dawson began importing Icelandic fish, when the Ingólfr Arnarson trawler landed; this was opposed by the company and the Grimsby Fish Merchants' Association. Imports of Icelandic fish had been officially banned. In October 1954, the company chartered the Norwegian steamer Norfrost to import £40,000 worth of Halibut (150 tonnes), which was claimed to be the world's largest catch of deep sea fish; it would be enough fish for one million meals. By the end of the 1950s it was landing 100 million lbs of fish per year; at this time, Ross Group was a subsidiary of Trawlers Grimsby – in March 1959, the company changed its name to Ross Group, and all food was now branded under this name. In October 1965, it opened a division in the Netherlands with Eurofrost NV called Ross Diepvries in Breda, to distribute and make its products in the Dutch market.

=== Diversification ===
By the early 1960s, Ross's holdings included poultry, frozen and fresh foods, including fish, as well as its fish trawling, merchanting, and other operations. Yet the company's trawling operations, which by then represented just 5 percent of group sales, had become perennial money-losers. Ross also had a factory at Westwick, Norfolk from 1948, where they had fruit and vegetables – garden peas; it was bought completely by Ross in 1954, bought by United Biscuits in 1999, and was acquired by its present owners Heinz in 2000. Potato chips were introduced in 1962. It bought Grimsby Motors in June 1959, Sterling Poultry (broiler chicken) in May 1961, and Waterworth Brothers (fruitshops) in August 1964.

In the mid-1960s, its businesses were, in order of turnover: poultry; frozen foods; fish trawling and distribution; fresh foods other than fish; motors, transport, and vessel construction; chemicals and agricultural services; and overseas business. They were the largest fish distributors in the UK and worth £27 million in 1965.

In the mid-1960s, a new £430,000 11-storey headquarters was built in Grimsby by Myton, a division of Taylor Woodrow. The building, still in use as the head offices of Young's Bluecrest and known as 'Ross House', dominates the southern wall of the town's once thriving fish docks.

=== Takeover ===
Carl Ross left the Ross Group after an acrimonious board room struggle in 1965 and, as a direct result of this, Imperial Tobacco gained control in September 1969; the company had offered £47.5 million for Ross on 6 August 1969. While Carl Ross was in control Ross Group had diversified into non-fish foodstuffs such as Ross frozen food. While the non-fish food companies were subject to several further takeovers, the Ross fishing fleet was acquired by British United Trawlers by a merger with Associated Fisheries organised by the Industrial Reorganisation Corporation on 2 April 1969; Ross had tried to buy this company in 1961, then bid £15.5 million in December 1965, and £17 million in January 1966. The bid was referred to the Monopolies Commission, and rejected in May 1966.

By the 1970s, the three largest UK producers of frozen food were Birds Eye (UK), Findus (who opened a plant in Grimsby in June 1960) and Ross Group. By 1973, Findus and Ross were selling £41 million of goods per year, and Birds Eye sold £109 million. Ross Poultry was producing around £4 million per year, with its Buxted (now based in Suffolk) and Premier Farm brands.

On 16 March 1988 the company was bought by United Biscuits for £335 million.

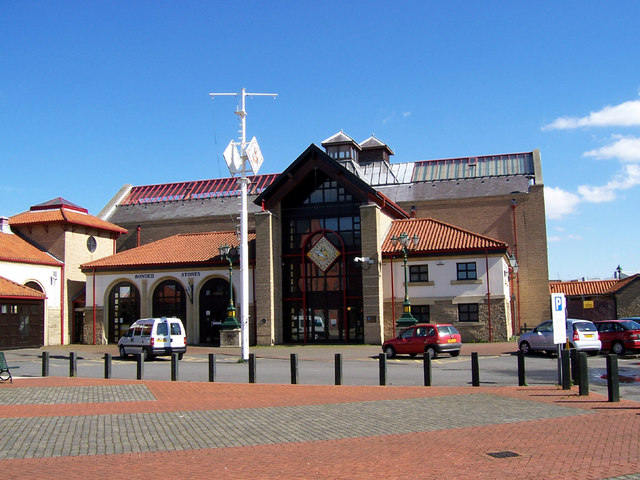
National Fishing Heritage Centre in Grimsby
