= Ross Tiger =

1957 fishing trawler

Coordinates: 53.569456°N 0.083316°W

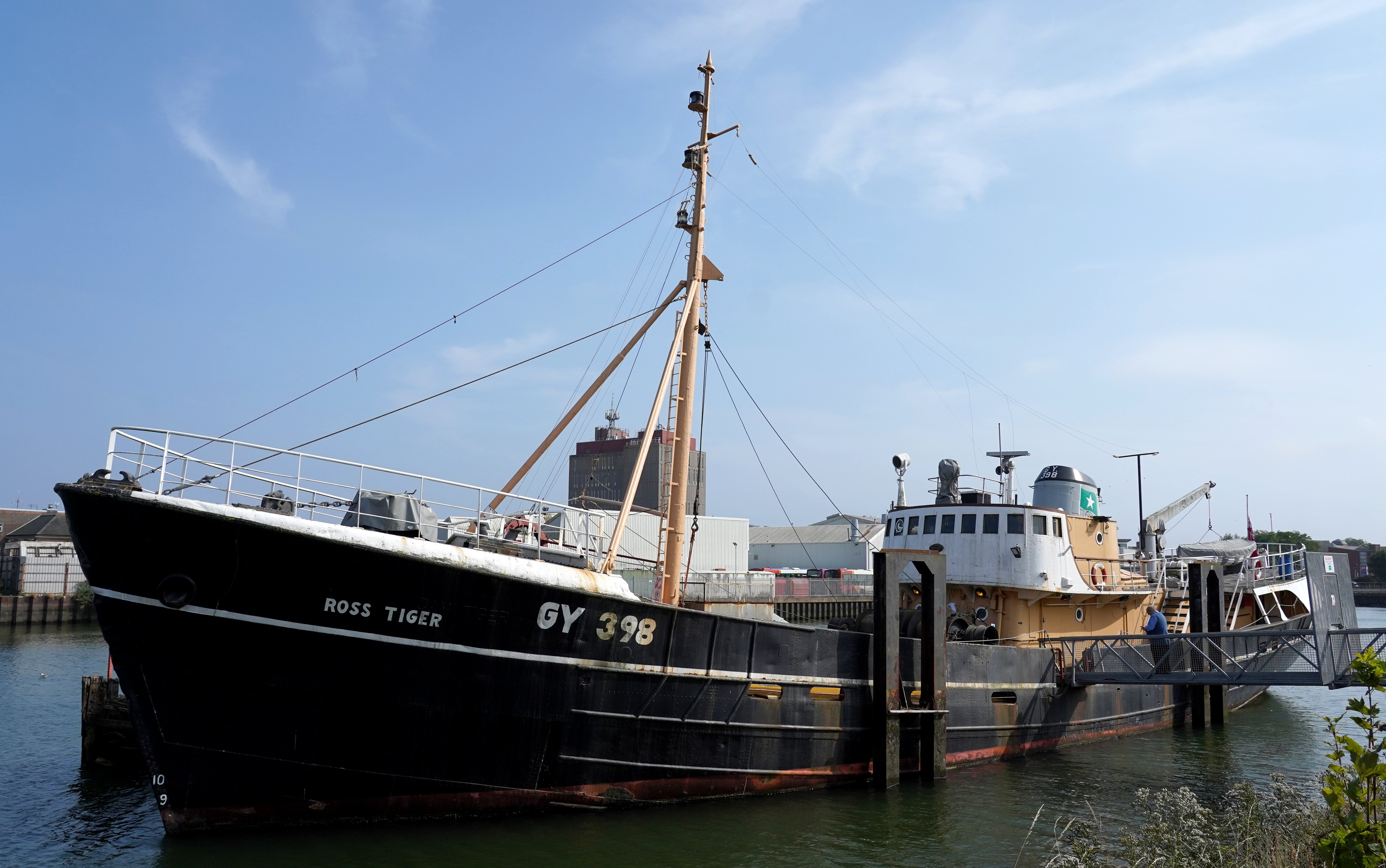

History

United Kingdom
- Name: Ross Tiger
- Owner: Ross Trawlers Ltd
- Port of registry: Grimsby, Lincolnshire
- Builder: Cochrane & Sons, Selby
- Laid down: 1956, completed and in service February 1957
- Identification: IMO number: 5300699
- Status: Retired 1992 for preservation as a museum ship in Grimsby's Alexandra Dock as part of the Fishing Heritage Centre

General characteristics
- Type: Trawler
- Tonnage: 355 tons
- Length: 127′ 6″
- Beam: 26′ 6″

Ross Tiger is a traditional side-winder fishing trawler that was converted into a museum ship in 1992. She is currently berthed in Alexandra Dock at her home port of Grimsby, close to the site of the former PS Lincoln Castle. She forms the star attraction of North East Lincolnshire County Council's National Fishing Heritage Centre since restored and opened to the public in 1992. As Grimsby's last traditional sidewinder 'conventional trawler', she represents a now virtually extinct breed of vessels that once made up the largest fishing fleet in the world.

She is a member of the National Register of Historic Vessels with certificate number 621.

== History ==
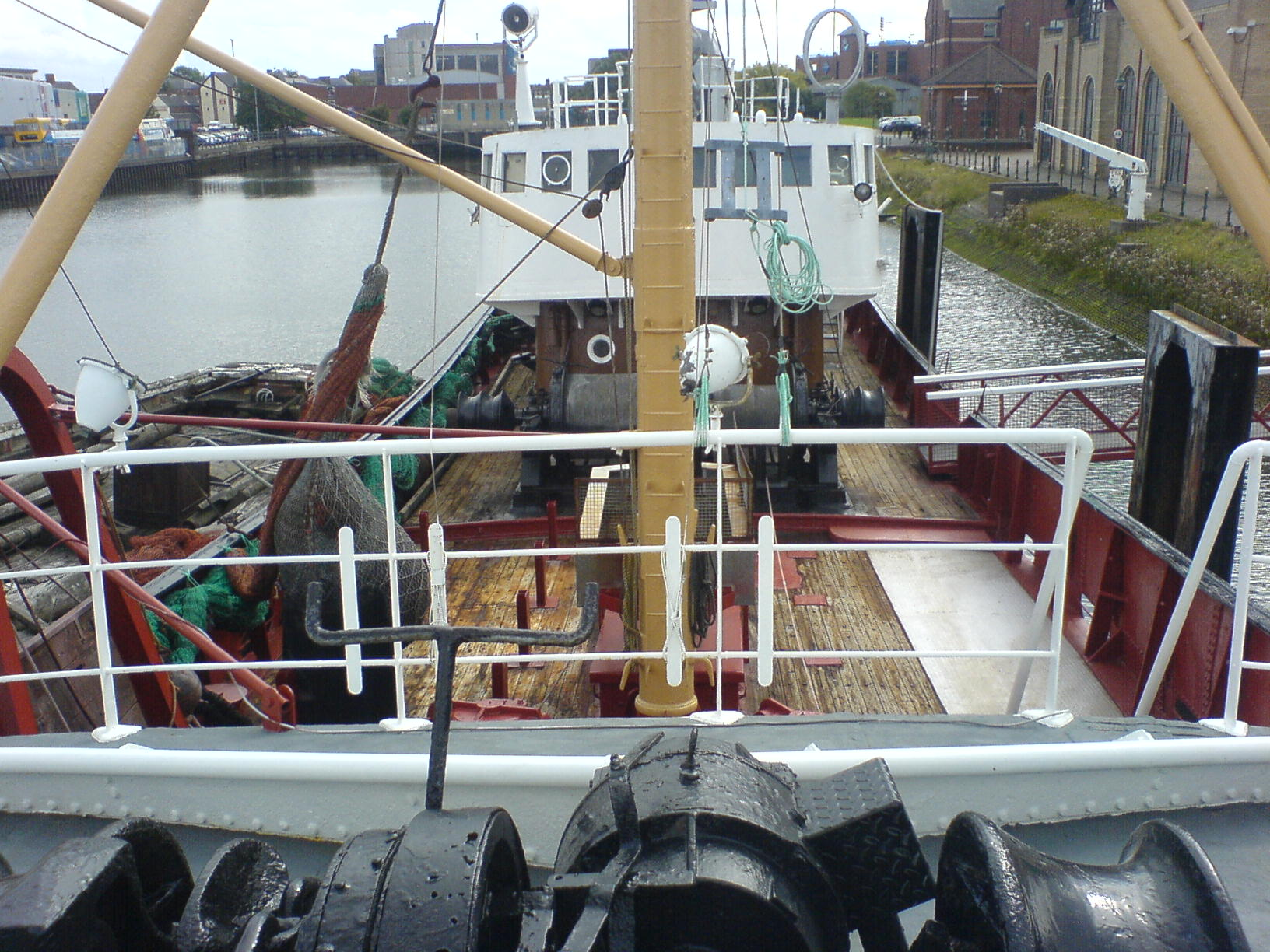
A view of the fishdeck and bridge of Ross Tiger, taken from atop of the whaleback.

Ross Tiger, GY398, is North East Lincolnshire's memorial to the history of the Port of Grimsby. The town today has thriving industry and is, according to ABP,'Chief vehicle-handling centre of the North, handling almost 400,000 vehicles annually' with ships up to 6000 dwt However, Grimsby will always be associated with its terrific history. With Victorian docks once the envy of the nation, Grimsby was famed for its great fishing fleet. Fishing from the port of Grimsby goes back as far as Grim, the Danish fisherman who founded the town, and her trawlers were a permanent feature of one of the busiest waterways in the British Isles – the River Humber. During World War II, Grimsby became the largest base for minesweepers in Britain, with the trawlers and motor minesweepers clearing 34,858 mines from the North Sea lanes. The brave men of the Royal Naval Patrol Service used peacetime fishing vessels to venture into known mine infested waters to sink mines and hunt submarines. When the trawlers returned to their fishing roles the fishing fleet grew along with the national demand for fish, with Grimsby rising to the title of the largest fishing port in the world. Ross Tiger (GY 398) was built to supply that demand.

Grimsby was witness to the evolution of the fishing trawler. It saw the change from the early timber sailing vessels to the introduction of steam which revolutionised the fishing fleet. Steam allowed for powerful vessels to push ever further north and it was soon found that new steel steam trawler design had to evolve further to cope with the extreme environments the ships were required to encounter; the traditional 'bridge aft side' design of trawler was lost to ships with a hardy sleek steel wheelhouse amidships, the ships developed sleek hulls with the addition of a 'whaleback' forward in an attempt to provide shelter to the fishdeck, steam engines were replaced by modern powerful marine diesel technology and at the final stage of this evolution of the side winder trawler is Ross Tiger. Being built in the 1950s she was constructed the decade prior to Grimsby's introduction to the modern 'stern trawlers' and welded ship construction that changed the profile of the trawler forever. She is also old enough to retain the traditional character, brass and woodwork that is similar to the heritage and atmosphere of trawlers long before her time, but was lost by the 1960s.

Ross Tiger was the first of twelve new trawlers for one of Grimsby's most prolific trawler owners. She entered service fresh from the yards of Cochrane and Sons, Selby, Yorkshire to become part of the 'middle water' fleet for Ross Trawlers Ltd. The trawlers of the town took their crews away in what is recognised as 'the most dangerous job in the United Kingdom' and scoured the ocean floors for deep sea fish, with a particular focus on cod and haddock. Haddock, regarded as a cleaner fish by Grimbarians, was preferred locally although the rail links from the town allowed for Grimsby fish to supply the nation, particularly with links to the south and the great Billingsgate Fish Market of London. The Cod Wars spelt the end of the life of many Grimsby trawlers, though some were saved from the breakers' yard to become standby vessels used for offshore oil rigs. The Ross Tiger was among those fortunate few, changing hands in 1985. However, the aging vessels were soon to be redundant and Ross Tiger was looking at the breakers' yard or yet another change of hands. Once again, Ross Tiger proved lucky. She was purchased by a museum trust to become the star attraction of her home town's Fishing Heritage Centre, and restored to her fishing day glory. An article in the Grimsby Telegraph on 14 July 1992 quoted the local council as they made it clear that Ross Tiger "will remain as a fitting monument to the people who sailed out of what was once known as the world's premier fishing port". Guided tours of the vessel show visitors the unique spaces aboard and demonstrate how various pieces of equipment aboard this traditional design of trawler were used.

Despite conversion to a standby vessel, much of the original fabric of the ship is retained. This includes the ship's original Ruston and Hornsby diesel engines, wood paneling, cabins, galley, mess and wheelhouse with period instruments. The plush skipper's berth, just abaft the bridge, is also surprisingly well preserved, including the original lampshades.

Ross Tiger has recently undergone substantial maintenance work to her exterior above the waterline. The ship is still in sound condition, but unless she is able to secure funding for her future and the required maintenance work that will soon be needed to be carried out on her hull, including transport to an area of the docks that will permit this, the ship will be at risk of further deterioration. The recent scrapping the historic PS Lincoln Castle is still fresh in the memories of those who care for the tremendously significant and industrious history of the region.

== The Classes and their Grounds ==
Fisherman, Lou Torrington, shelving haddocks in the fishroom of the Cat Class trawler Ross Leopard, sistership to Ross Tiger

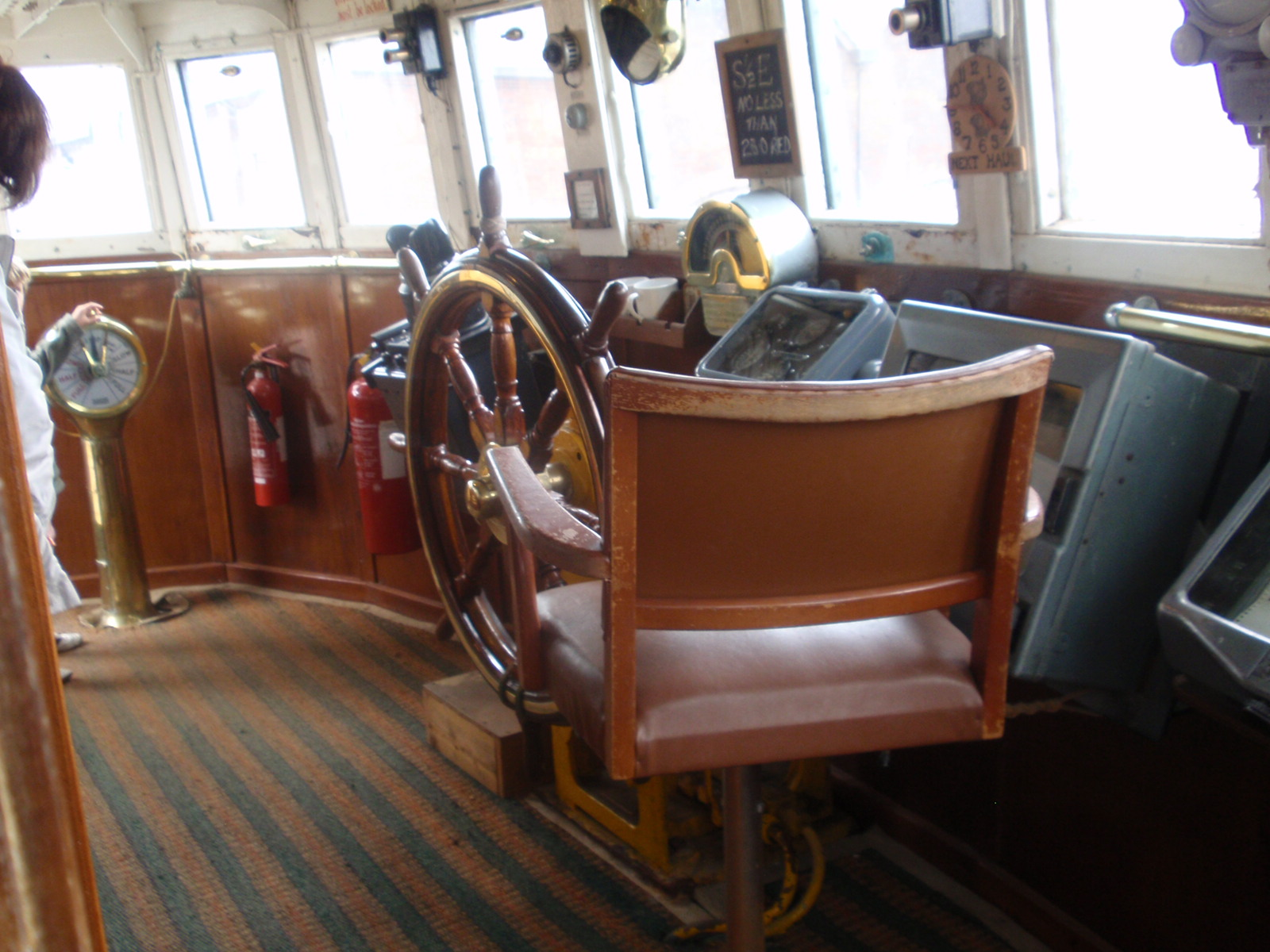
The bridge interior of Ross Tiger

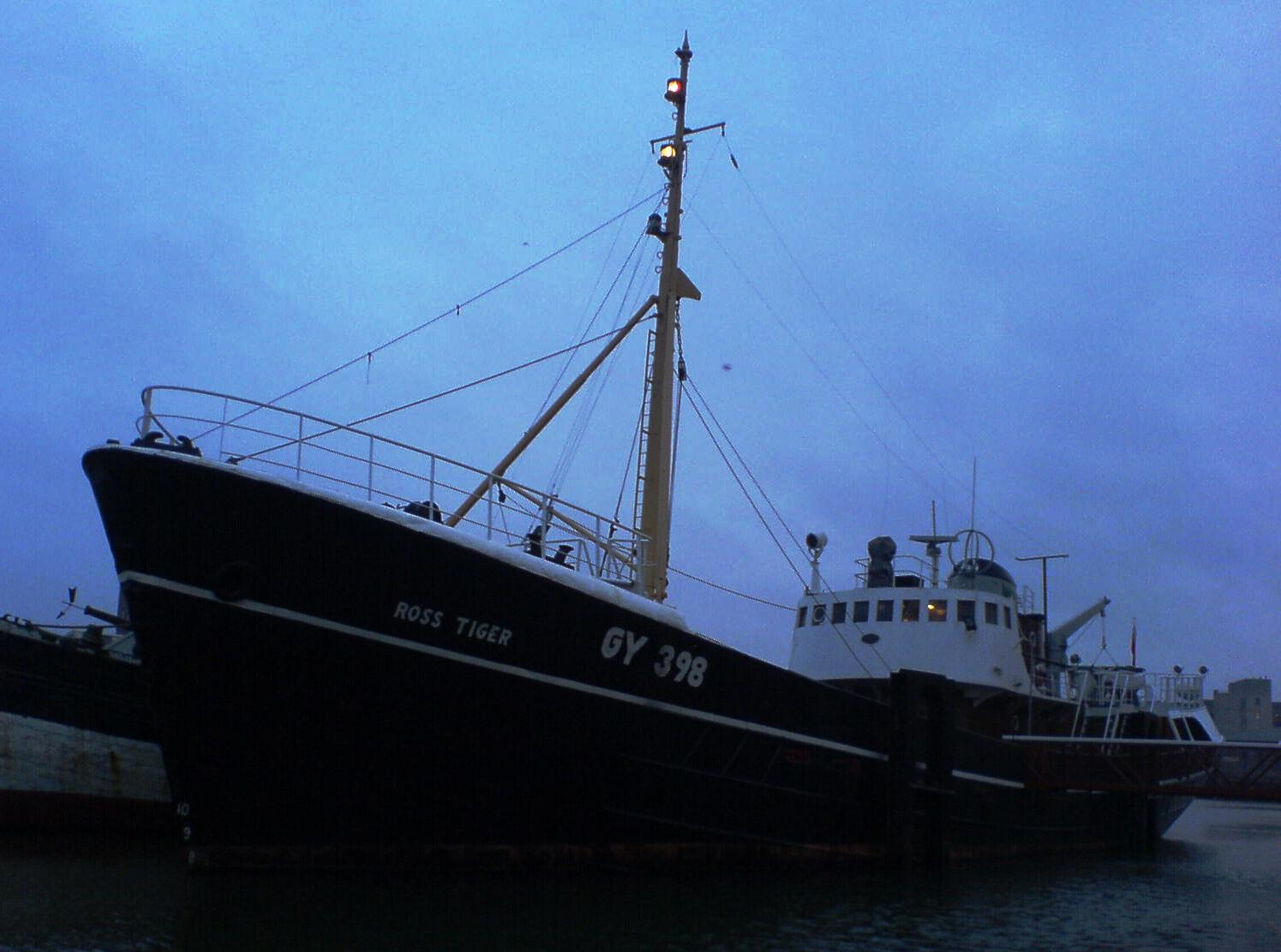
Ross Tiger seen at dusk in Grimsby's Alexandra dock.

Ross Tiger was the first of twelve new trawlers for the 'middle water' fleet of Ross Trawlers Ltd, complementing the larger 'deep water' fleet of the firm, with Cochrane and Sons also constructing a new smaller class of 'near water' vessels. Ross Tiger and her sisters were to be known as the 'Cat Class' or the 'Cat Boats', each being named after a type of cat, although Ross Jackal and Ross Zebra also belonged to the group. This inclusion of a dog and a horse in the Cat Class was probably the result of a local school being involved in the naming of the ships. This was in keeping with the companies' involvement with the youth of the town and extended as far as giving guided school tours of the trawlers between trips whilst moored in Grimsby docks, with meals provided in the company canteen. Those children would soon be in search for work – a fact that the company knew well – and in the largest fishing port in the world that was likely to have been work at the docks. A fond memory of Ross Trawlers may well have been enough to ensure that those lads signed onto a Ross Group ship instead of one of the many rival firms in the town.

As a middle water trawler she would work the North Sea, Faroe Islands and the Norwegian coast, although is capable of making trips further north. The larger 'deep water' vessels would commonly take on the hazardous Arctic oceans including Bear Island and Greenland. Ross Revenge, better known as the radio ship Radio Caroline belonged to the deep water fleet of Ross Trawlers and is still in existence today, preserved in her radio ship form. The smaller vessels of the Ross fleet, designed for waters closer to home, were known as the 'Bird Class' or 'Bird Boats' and were named after birds, for example, Ross Falcon and Ross Mallard. As Ross Tiger was the first of her kind, subsequent Cat Class vessels saw minor alterations to the design. This included slightly extending the bridge top to allow for larger side-light screens and the addition of bobbin derricks to the bridge verandah to assist in working the trawl. Most of the class built after 1958 featured a flat transom, although Ross Jackal of 1960 was given the original rounded transom as seen on Ross Tiger. Despite these few alterations the vessels of the class were, in most respects, identical sisters. Today, what was once the largest fishing port in the world has only a handful of small fishing craft and no deep water fleet. The recent controversial loss of the PS Lincoln Castle gave cause for concern that the town was losing touch with its once Great status, with the Grimsby Telegraph quoting NE Lincs Council as stating 'it would not be right to burden council taxpayers with the bill' to keep the steamer in the town. Fishing the way that Ross Tiger did, the handling of the heavy trawl equipment of a sidewinder, the open decks and low rails and the long hours in the elements gutting fish by hand on deck is thankfully far from the ways of the modern deep sea trawlers of today. The only reminder in Grimsby of what people in this part of the world did for so long, on this traditional design of trawler, is the uniquely surviving Ross Tiger.

== Statistics ==
- Builders: Cochrane & Sons, Selby, Yard No 1416.
- Delivery: Grimsby, February 1957. Registered to Derwent Trawlers.
- Gross Tonnage: 355.
- Nett Tonnage: 127.
- Length: 127.6 ft.
- Beam: 26.5 ft.
- Depth: 13 ft.
- Engines: 7 Cylinder, Diesel, manufactured in Lincoln, Lincolnshire by Ruston & Hornsby

== Hauntings ==
The museum, including Ross Tiger, is said to be the home of various spirits. This has manifested itself in unexplained cold spots, smells, such as tobacco smoke, and footsteps with no obvious source. It is believed that the spirits may be associated with the previous use of the land that the museum occupies – a former timber yard – though some believe that the hauntings of the Ross Tiger are more likely to be due to former crew members or a particular ex-member of the museum staff that enjoys making his presence known. Investigators from television's Most Haunted have visited the ship.

== Previous Skippers ==
Include but may not be limited to:

- Alfred Hodson
- Edward Hodson
- William H Hodson
- Walter Stokes
- George Drewery
- Alfred E Drury
- John G Drury
- J Daly
- Dennis Avery
- Arthur Barnard
- Jimmy Brown
- Peter Brown
- Alfred George Camburn
- George Chambers
- Jeff Colbert
- Charlie Cressie
- Frank Gilchrist
- James Gordon
- C Greaves
- John Major
- Harry Mitchell
- Lionel Huxford
- J. Yensen
- William Goddard Johnson
- Ronnie Slingsby
- James Hudson
- George Edward Pedersen (Took the Tiger on her maiden trip, Feb 1957)
- W. B Roach
- John Roberts
- D Sinclair
- Lennie C Smith
- Dennis Speck
- Sheldon Stoakes
- Gill Welbourn
- Chris Yensen

Ross Tiger skipper Alf Hodson (left), with Mate L Torrington, seen at Hull Fair. Mr Hodson went on to become a well-respected former trawler guide of Ross Tiger during preservation of the vessel as a museum at Grimsby's National Fishing Heritage Centre.

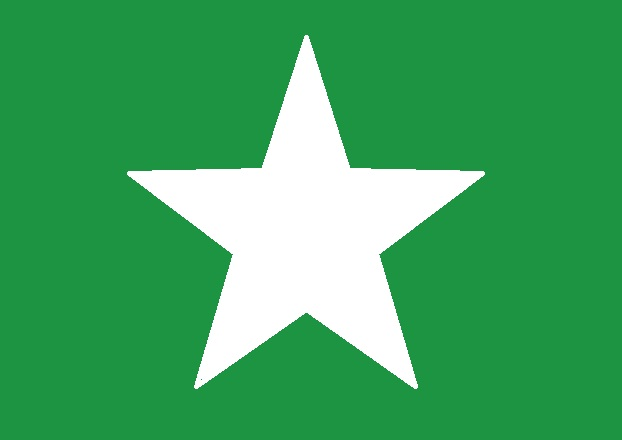
Flag flown by trawlers of the Ross fleet, usually also painted onto the funnel of the ship

== The 'Cat Boats' ==
- Ross Tiger – February 1957
- Ross Leopard – October 1957 (believed to have been recently dismantled in Ostend, Belgium)
- Ross Jaguar – December 1957 (Converted into a three masted tall-ship and renamed simply Jaguar)
- Ross Panther – April 1958
- Ross Cougar – April 1958
- Ross Cheetah – November 1959
- Ross Lynx – February 1960
- Ross Jackal – April 1960
- Ross Puma – August 1960 (Wrecked off Hoy in 1968 – the only of the Cat Boats to have been lost, though all hands saved)
- Ross Genet – October 1960
- Ross Civet – October 1960
- Ross Zebra – November 1960.

== See also ==
- National Fishing Heritage Centre
- Ross Revenge
- Rainbow Warrior (1957)
- Arctic Corsair Hull's deep-water trawler and last survivor of its once great fleet to rival Grimsby
- Viola (trawler) Middle-water traditional 'bridge-aft-sider' trawler. In derelict condition with hopes of regeneration.
- Rinovia Steam Fishing Company Ltd.
