= Arctic Corsair =

Museum ship in Kingston upon Hull, England

Coordinates: 53°44′34″N 0°19′40″W

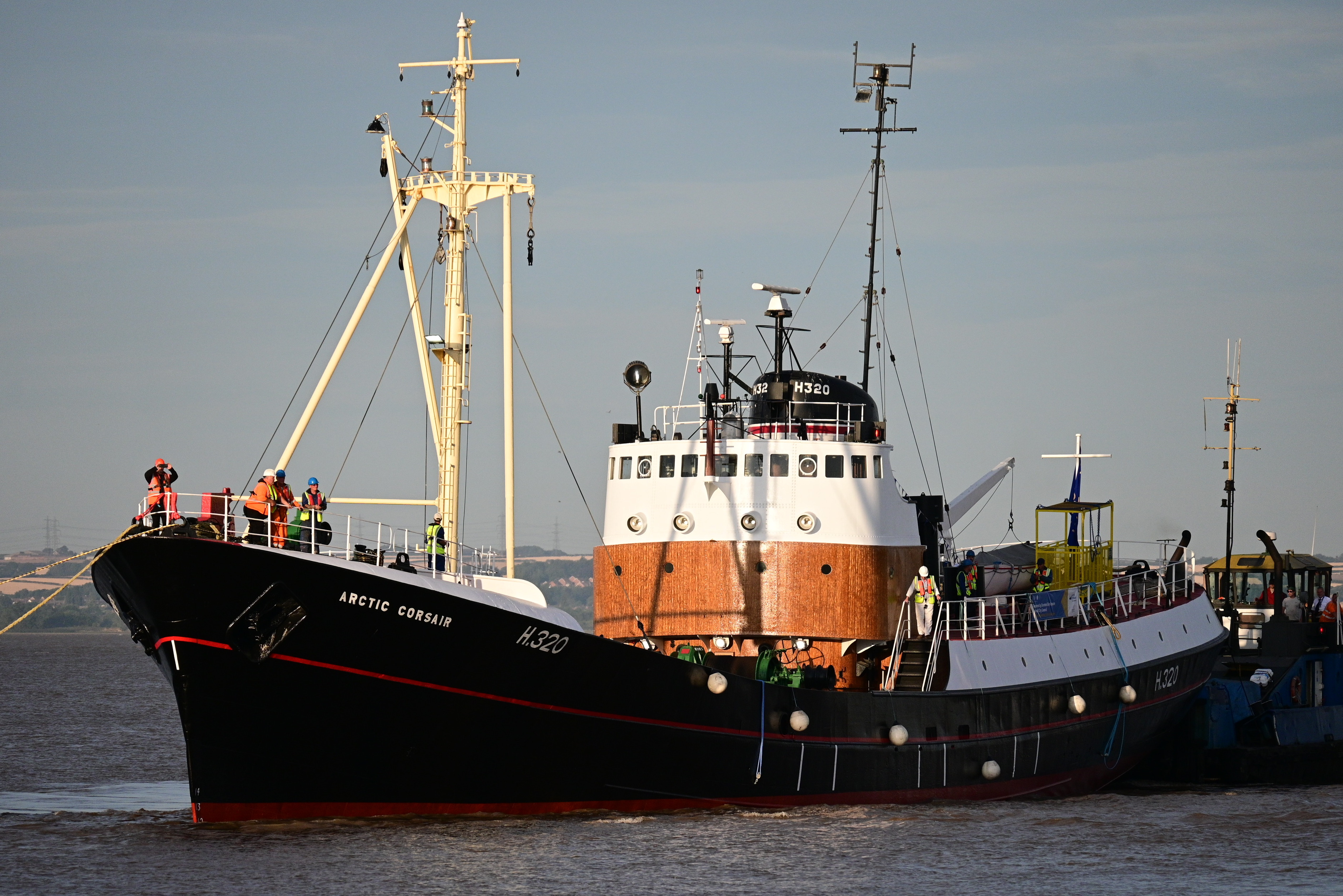
- Arctic Corsair on the Humber in 2026

History

United Kingdom
- Name: Arctic Corsair
- Owner: Boyd Line, Hull
- Port of registry: Hull
- Builder: Cook, Welton & Gemmell, Beverley
- Yard number: 959
- Launched: 29 February 1960
- Out of service: 1993
- Renamed: Arctic Cavalier (15 January 1988); Arctic Corsair (18 June 1993)
- Identification: IMO number: 5022340; British Official Number 301638; Fishery number H320
- Status: Museum ship

General characteristics
- Class & type: Diesel side-fishing trawler
- Tonnage: 764 GRT, 256 NRT
- Length: 187.1 ft (57.0 m)
- Beam: 33.6 ft (10.2 m)
- Installed power: 1,800 bhp (1,300 kW)
- Propulsion: 6-cylinder Mirrlees Monarch diesel engine
- Speed: 15 knots (28 km/h)

The Arctic Corsair (H320) is a deep-sea trawler, built in 1960, that was converted to a museum ship in 1999. From August 2026, she is berthed at the North End Shipyard in Kingston upon Hull, England, a museum and former drydock in the city's Museums Quarter. Exhibits and guides aboard the boat, pending its reopening in 2026, tell the story of Hull's deep-sea fishing industry.

== Description ==
The Arctic Corsair is Hull's last surviving sidewinder trawler, a type of ship that formed the backbone of the city's deep sea fishing fleet. She was built in 1960, at Cook, Welton & Gemmell in Beverley, and was the second diesel-engined trawler built for the Boyd Line, the first being the Arctic Cavalier which was launched the previous month. She was designed for the harsh conditions encountered in the Icelandic fishing grounds, having a rivetted rather than welded hull.

== History ==
In September 1967 Arctic Corsair was holed on her starboard side in a collision off the coast of Scotland with the Irish collier Olive in thick fog. Attempting to reach harbour in Wick she was beached in Sinclair Bay but eventually repaired and refloated.

In 1973, she broke the world record for landing of cod and haddock from the White Sea.

On 30 April 1976 during the cod wars, she rammed the offshore patrol vessel ICGV Óðinn in the stern, after Óðinn had made three attempts to cut the Corsair's trawl warps. The skipper, Charles Pitts, said that Icelandic seamen were becoming "more ambitious and dangerous in their tactics". With his ship holed below the waterline, and patched up temporarily by the Royal Navy, Pitts decided to head for home for permanent repairs. Arctic Corsair was out of action for several months. In 2017, the vessels, now both museum ships, exchanged their bells as a gesture of cooperation.

In 1978 she was converted for midwater trawling, and in 1981 laid up at Hull. In 1985 she was taken out of retirement and reconverted for normal fishing. She was renamed Arctic Cavalier in 1988.

== Museum ship ==
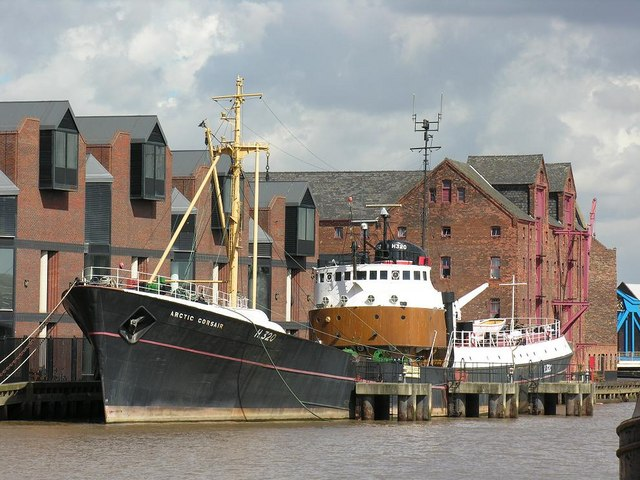
Arctic Corsair moored outside the Streetlife Museum of Transport in 2005

In 1991, a campaign by fishing heritage group STAND secured £45,000 from the DTI Hull Task Force which enabled Hull City Council to purchase the trawler in 1993. The vessel immediately reverted to Arctic Corsair, and was berthed between Drypool Bridge and Myton Bridge in the River Hull as a museum ship.

After being restored by trainees and volunteers from the STAND, the floating museum opened to the public in 1999. STAND entered into partnership with the City Council to provide volunteers to maintain and act as tour guides. Today, the floating museum is run entirely by volunteers but supported by Hull City Council. Arctic Corsair was temporarily closed during restoration work.

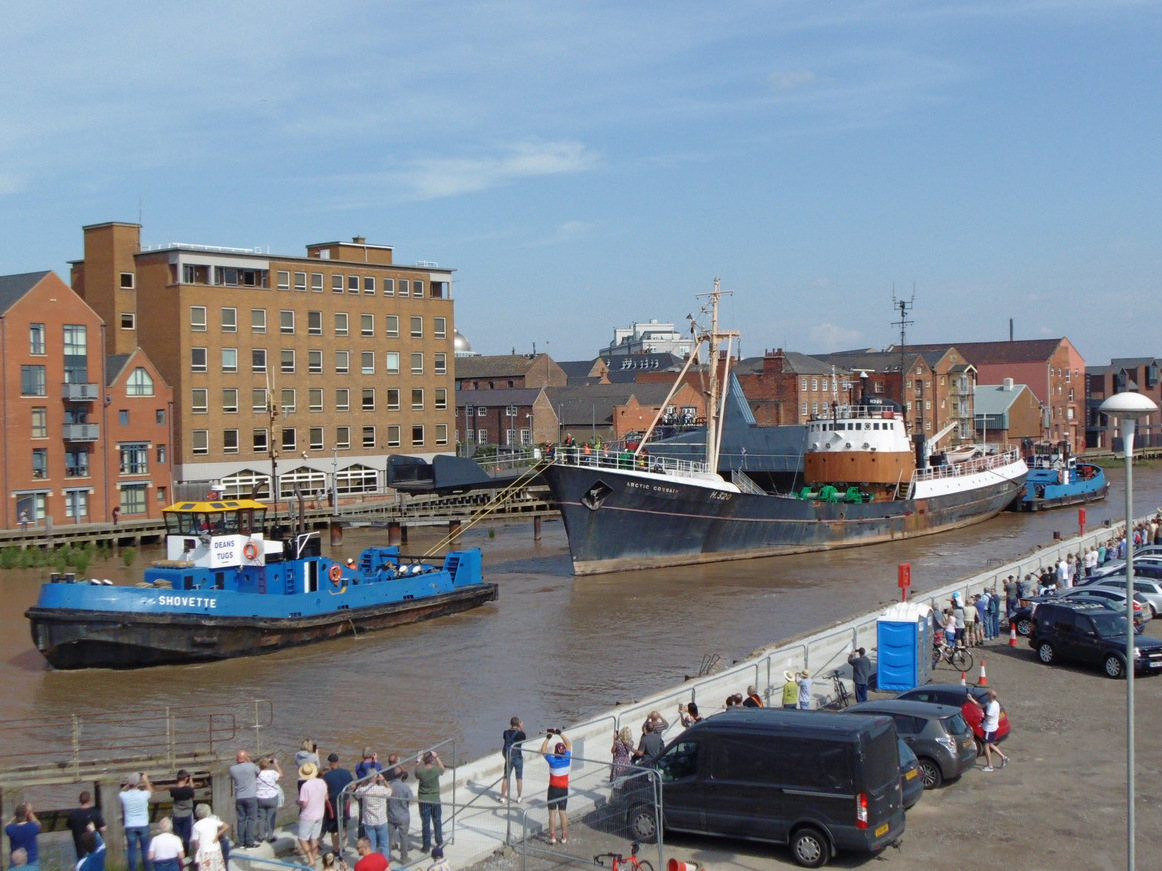
Arctic Corsair being towed along the River Hull in August 2019

In June 2018, it was announced that she was to move to dry dock in September 2018 while flood defence work was undertaken on the River Hull. This was delayed while other flood defence work was undertaken but on 4 August 2019 was she moved to a temporary berth in Alexandra Dock. A later aspect was a planned-move to a new permanent berth in the redeveloped North End Shipyard in Dock Office Row as part of the Hull Maritime City project, back in the Museums Quarter; initial groundwork on the shipyard's visitor centre commenced in November 2022. On 6 October 2021, she was moved by two tugs to Dunston's shipyard to undergo restoration work.

Following the completion of extensive restoration work, on the morning of 14 August 2026, she was towed from Duston's shipyard by three tugs down the River Hull to the North End Shipyard in what was described as the ship's "final journey". Extensive dredging of River Hull mud to achieve a deeper channel required planning consent.

== See also ==
- Middle-water trawler Ross Tiger, last surviving vessel of the rival fleet across the Humber at Grimsby
- Viola (trawler) Middle-water traditional 'bridge-aft-sider' trawler. In derelict condition with hopes of regeneration.
