= Conseil supérieur de l'audiovisuel (Belgium) =

Independent audiovisual conseil

CSA
- Conseil supérieur de l'audiovisuel (Belgium)
- Formation: 1987
- Headquarters: Rue Royale, 89 – 1000 Bruxelles
- Location: Brussels, Belgium
- Official language: French
- President: Karim Ibourki
- Website: Official website

The Conseil supérieur de l'audiovisuel (CSA) is the independent administrative authority responsible for regulating the audiovisual media sector such as television, radio, cable TV, and so on in the French-speaking community of southern Belgium. It is headquartered on Rue Royale, 89, 1000 Bruxelles, Brussels.

== Origins and status ==
The CSA was created in 1987 as a purely consultative body, integrated into the administration of the Wallonia-Brussels Federation. It has been organized as an independent administrative authority since the implementation of the decree of July 24, 1997. The decree of February 27, 2003 confirmed this evolution, giving it both legal personality and new authorization and control missions. A new decree on audiovisual media services (transposing the EU directive on audiovisual media services into the regulatory framework of the Wallonia-Brussels Federation) came into force on March 28, 2009.

The CSA is part of the history of Belgian federalism. As in all federal states, the division of powers is governed by the Constitution and fundamental laws. In Belgium, cultural matters (including broadcasting) are the responsibility of the Communities. The CSA's equivalents are the Vlaamse Regulator voor de Media (VRM) for the Flemish community of Belgium and the Medienrat for the German-speaking community of Belgium. The CSA is a "convergent" authority, meaning that it has jurisdiction over both the audiovisual and telecommunications sectors.

== Missions ==
=== The role of the CSA ===
The CSA contributes to the deployment of plural, diversified, and inclusive audiovisual media at the service of a democratic society. It has three main missions:

- Promoting respect for legal rules, citizens' rights, and pluralism
- Supporting the audiovisual sector in a dynamic of reasoned and participatory regulation
- Understand and promote the audiovisual sector through research and forward-looking initiatives, and by investing in European and international exchanges.

The CSA protects the interests of the public and ensures a balanced industry.

The conseil is not a censorship body that deprives citizens of certain content. The CSA can only intervene in the content of programs after they have been broadcast. Its power to intervene is therefore exercised a posteriori and is limited to certain specific cases defined in audiovisual legislation.

Sanctioning a publisher is a last recourse. Before taking such measures, the CSA works closely with the sector, listening to what it has to say and seeking solutions that will enable it to rethink itself daily.

Audiovisual media services are subject to rules laid down by decree, based on which the CSA carries out regular checks. These controls are not intended to censor, but to ensure compliance with these rules.

== Composition ==
The CSA is made up of a bureau and two Colleges: an advisory body (the Collège d'avis), responsible for issuing opinions on all matters relating to the audiovisual sector, and a decision-making body (the Collège d'autorisation et de contrôle), responsible for granting broadcasting authorizations to private television and radio stations established in the French-speaking community, monitoring compliance with the obligations of service publishers, service distributors, and network operators, and sanctioning breaches of these obligations. An administrative structure ("services du CSA") completes the picture.

=== Advisory board ===
==== Missions ====
The main mission of the advisory board is to issue, on its initiative or at the request of the government or parliament of the French-speaking community, opinions on any question relating to the audiovisual sector, including advertising (except questions falling within the remit of the Authorization and Control Board).

It is also responsible for giving its opinion on:

- modifications to decrees and regulations that it considers necessary to take into account technological, economic, social, and cultural developments in the audiovisual sector, as well as European and international law;
- respect for the democratic rules guaranteed by the Constitution;
- the protection of children and adolescents in programming.

It must also draw up and maintain regulations on advertising communications, respect for human dignity, protection of minors, and political information during election periods.

==== Composition ====
In addition to the members of the board (the chair and three vice-chairs), the advisory board comprises 30 members (each with a deputy) appointed by the government. Their term of office is four years, renewable.

=== The Bureau ===
The CSA board is responsible for operational decisions. It is empowered to carry out, autonomously, all acts necessary or useful to the exercise of the CSA's powers and its administration (legal representation, staff recruitment, coordination and organization of the CSA's work, compliance of opinions with domestic, EU, and international law, etc.).

The CSA board comprises the chair, three vice-chairs, and the director. Its members are also ex-officio members of the Authorization and Control Board (10 members) and the advisory board (34 members). Their term of office is five years, renewable. The composition of the Board guarantees the representation of different ideological and philosophical trends.

As provided in the coordinated decree on audiovisual media services, the Government of the French Community appointed, by a decree dated November 8, 2012, the four new members who make up the CSA Bureau: Dominique Vosters became chairman; Pierre Houtmans became First vice-chairman; Bernadette Wynants became Second vice-chairman; and François-Xavier Blanpain became Third vice-chairman.

On November 15, 2017, Karim Ibourki succeeded Dominique Vosters as head of the Belgian CSA.

=== Secretariat of Instruction ===
The Secretariat of Instruction is a special department within the CSA, that receives complaints or remarks from the public concerning radio or television programs: offenses against human dignity, gratuitous violence, protection of minors, application of signage, duration of advertising, for example. It investigates all complaints submitted to it, then submits them to the Collège d'autorisation et de contrôle (authorization and control board), which may establish the infringement and, if necessary, impose penalties. To carry out the tasks entrusted to it, the Investigation Secretariat may gather any information required to ensure compliance with the obligations imposed on authorization holders, from both individuals and corporate bodies; it may also carry out investigations.

=== CSA services ===
Under the responsibility of the Director General, the CSA's departments are responsible for preparing the files submitted to the Colleges for decision.

The departments are made up of twenty-six people working in different units specializing in specific fields (radio, television, distributors & new platforms, studies & research, communication and secretariat).

Among these departments, the Investigation Secretariat enjoys a special status, as it works in complete independence. It receives complaints from the public concerning the audiovisual sector, in particular radio and television programs: advertising, violation of human dignity, gratuitous violence, protection of minors, and application of signage. It investigates all admissible complaints and submits them to the Collège d'autorisation et de contrôle when it considers that an infringement of audiovisual legislation has been committed.

Any citizen can complain simply by completing the dedicated form on the website.

=== Authorizations and declarations ===
The broadcasting decree of February 27, 2003, divides the audiovisual industry into three categories, according to the jobs performed and the particular responsibilities inherent in them:

- The service publisher is the legal entity that assumes editorial responsibility for one or more broadcasting services, to broadcast them or have them broadcast. These publishers, who are subject to an authorization system, are concerned by content-related provisions (public right to information, transparency and safeguarding of pluralism of supply, respect for human dignity and protection of minors, advertising communication, contribution to audiovisual production, broadcasting quotas for works, in particular);
- service distributor: this is the legal entity that makes one or more broadcasting services available to the public by any means whatsoever, including terrestrial, satellite, or cable. A declaratory regime applies. Its regulatory obligations relating to transparency and pluralism (the exercise of any significant position that would undermine the public's freedom of access to a pluralistic offering in broadcasting services), contribution to the production of audiovisual works, basic offering and "must carry", conditional access, in particular;
- network operator: any legal entity that carries out the technical operations of a broadcasting network required for the transmission and broadcasting of broadcasting services to the public. A declaratory regime applies. Its obligations concern access to networks and the competitive situation (determination of relevant markets and operators with significant market power; special rules for radio frequencies).

One of the main missions of the authorization and control board is to authorize private service publishers and the use of radio frequencies. Since the adoption of the broadcasting decree of February 27, 2003, the CSA has authorized 26 television broadcasting services and 28 non-FM radio broadcasting services. After verification of compliance with regulatory conditions, acknowledgments of receipt of declarations of activity for 16 service distributors and 13 network operators were sent to the parties concerned.

In addition the authorization and control board is responsible for issuing an opinion before the authorization, by the government of the French community, of local television stations (of which there are 12) and on any draft agreement to be concluded between the government and publishers, whether public or private (in the case of private publishers, this concerns the agreement governing their contribution to the production of audiovisual works, and in the case of public publishers, their management contract).

=== The CSA's powers of control and sanction ===
At least once a year the Authorization and Control Board is responsible for ensuring that private and public broadcasters comply with their regulatory and contractual obligations. The same applies to service distributors.

In addition to this recurrent control, the CSA notes any violation of the decree on audiovisual media services and video-sharing platforms, broadcasting regulations and agreements and, in the event of infringement, pronounces an administrative sanction ranging from a warning to the withdrawal of authorization, including a financial penalty and the publication of a press release describing the infringement.

== See also ==
- Conseil supérieur de l'audiovisuel (France)
