= Viola (trawler) =

Steam trawler built in 1906

Coordinates: 54.280259°S 36.506226°W

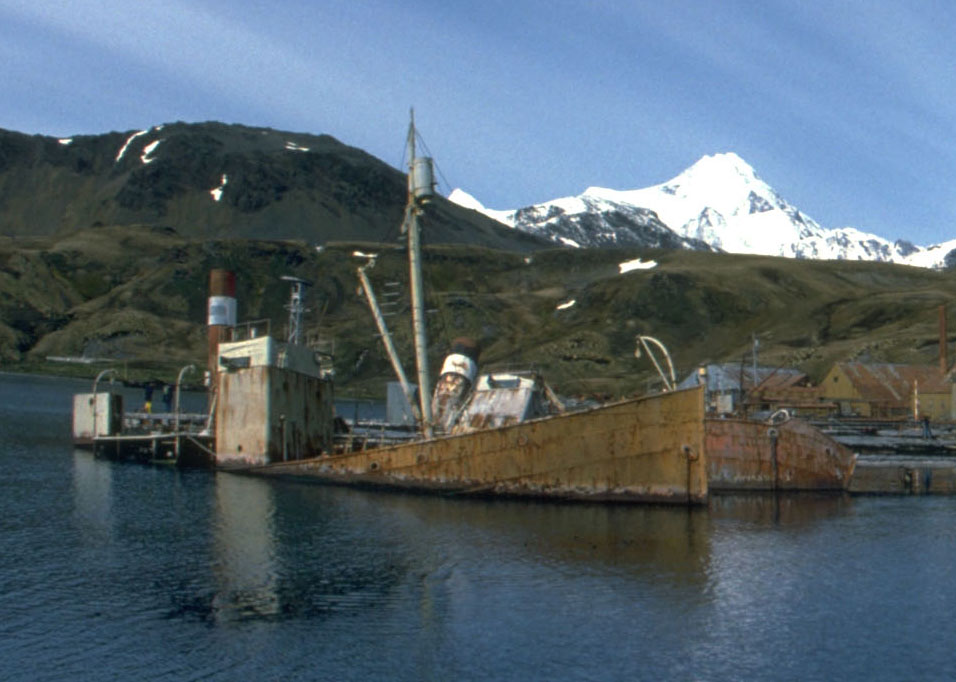
- Dias (foreground) with Albatros (heeled over) in the harbour at Grytviken, 1989. The ships have since been beached.

History
- Name: Viola (1906); HMT Viola (1914); Kapduen (1919); Dias (1926)
- Owner: Hellyer Steam Fishing Company (1906-14); Admiralty (1914 - 1919); A/S Sandsfjord Trawlfiskelskap, Norway (1919-1926); Compañía Argentina de Pesca SA 1926
- Operator: Hellyer Steam Fishing Company
- Port of registry: Hull, 14 February 1906
- Builder: Cook, Welton & Gemmell
- Yard number: 96
- Launched: 17 January 1906
- Identification: H868
- Status: Derelict (2009)

General characteristics
- Class & type: Fishing trawler/naval trawler
- Tonnage: 179 GRT 55 NRT
- Length: 108 ft 6 in (33.07 m)
- Beam: 21 ft 6 in (6.55 m)
- Installed power: steam
- Speed: 9.5 knots (10.9 mph; 17.6 km/h)

The Viola is a steam trawler built in 1906 in Hull. She is the oldest surviving steam trawler in the world. During her long career, she was known as HMT Viola, Kapduen, and Dias. She is currently beached at Grytviken in South Georgia, though there are currently plans afoot to return her to Hull.

== History ==
Cook, Welton & Gemmell of Beverley built Viola for the Hellyer Steam Fishing Company in 1906. After launching, she was floated down the River Hull to Hull where the engineering firm of Amos & Smith fitted her with steam engines. She burnt coal until 1956 when she was converted to oil. She was part of the Hellyer Steam Fishing Company's North Sea fleet, and like much of Hellyer's fleet was named after a Shakespearean character.

Hellyer trawlers stayed out at sea for weeks at a time, transferring their catch to a fleet of five fast steam cutters that commuted between the fishing grounds and the fish markets of eastern England. Viola was regularly at sea for more than 310 days a year.

== Viola at war ==
In September 1914, Viola was requisitioned by the Admiralty (FY 614) armed with a 3 pounder gun and moved to Shetland, patrolling the waters out as far as Fair Isle looking for U-boats and escorting other vessels.

Later in the war, Viola was armed with a 12-pounder gun, and transferred to the Tyne for minesweeping duty. She was one of the first vessels to use depth charges. She was also fitted with hydrophones. Along with other armed trawlers she was involved in actions resulting in the sinking of at least two U-boats: the UB-30 off Whitby on 13 August 1918, and the UB-115 off the Northumberland coast on 29 September.

== Kapduen and Dias - whaling ==
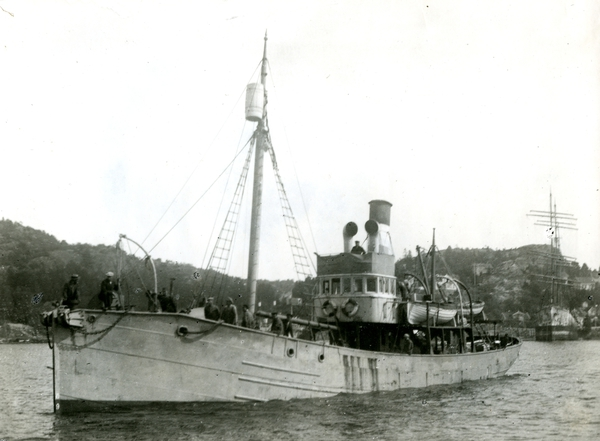
Dias as whale catcher

Many vessels from Hellyer's North Sea fleet were lost during the war. After the war Hellyer decided to concentrate on the distant fishing grounds off the coast of Iceland and the Barents Sea. Consequently, in 1918 they sold-off the remaining North Sea trawlers, including Viola, which they sold to Massey & Sons. In the following year Massey sold her to L. Thorsen of Norway, who renamed her Kapduen. The whaling firm of Nils Torvald Nielsen Alonso acquired Thorsen and converted Kapduen for whaling, fitting her with a new bridge forward of the funnel.

She was renamed Dias in 1924 and over the next few years whaled off the coast of Africa. By 1927 she was laid up at Sandefjord.

== Dias - sealing and expeditions ==
Dias was then sold to Compañía Argentina de Pesca, who moved her to Grytviken in South Georgia for sealing.

She also served as a support vessel for expeditions in the South Atlantic, supporting the Argentine weather station at Laurie Island, the Kohl-Larsen Expedition of 1928/9, the British South Georgia Expedition of 1954/55, the topographical surveys carried out by Duncan Carse between 1951 and 1957, and the Bird Island Expedition of 1958.

== Retirement and decay ==
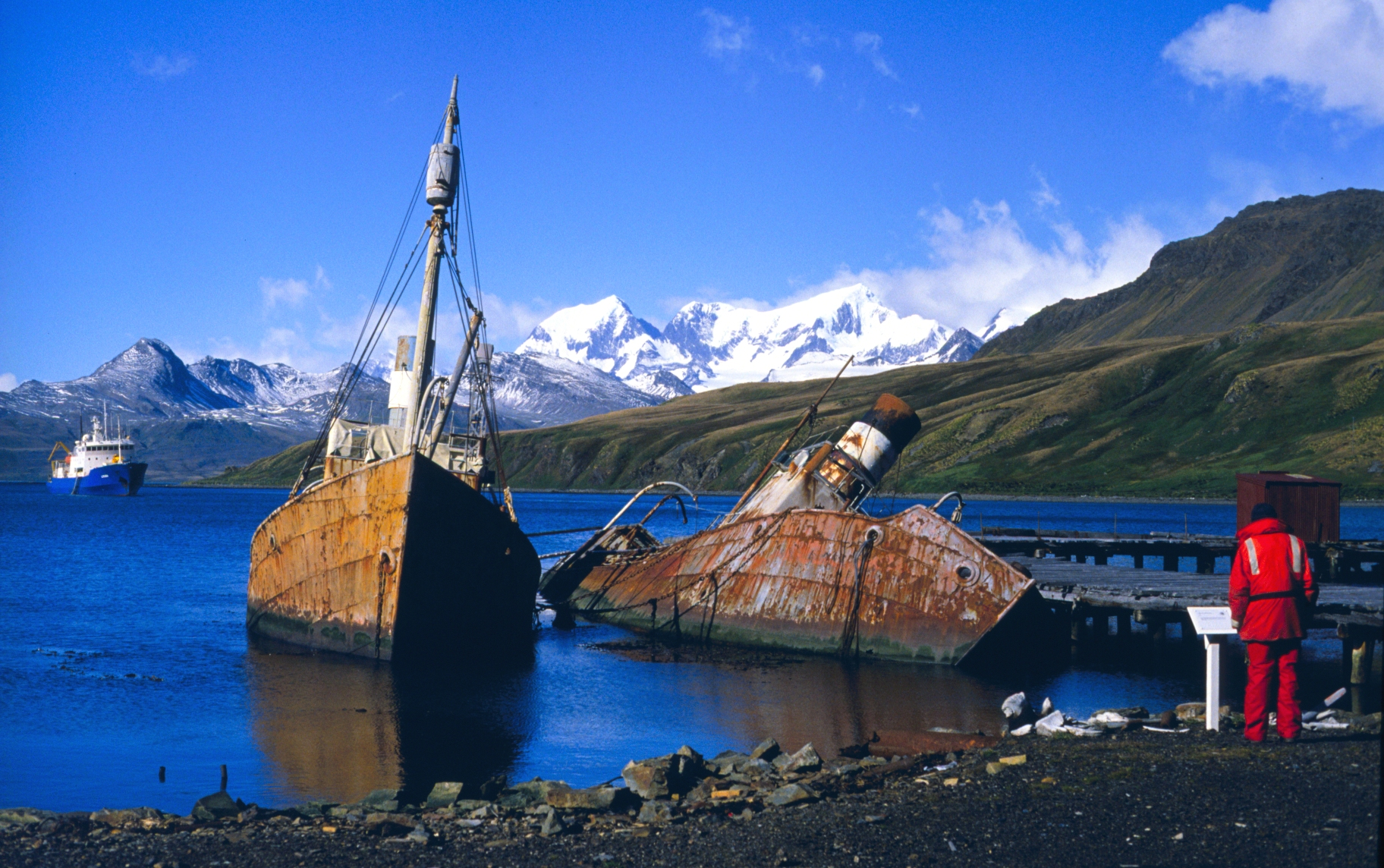

In 1964 the whaling station at Grytviken closed, and Dias, along with another sealer, Albatros, was laid up. A caretaker was responsible for maintenance, painting, and running the engines, but he left in 1971. Over the next few years snow and ice built up on the superstructure and Dias foundered at her mooring in the winter of 1974. Albatros sank the following year.

== Rescue campaign ==
In 2004, as part of a project to restore and conserve Grytviken, Dias and Albatros were refloated and cleared of all remaining oil. Both ships have now been beached.

An organisation, the "Friends of Viola/Dias", seeks to preserve the ship, either in situ or by bringing her back to Hull. The "Friends of Viola/Dias" estimate the cost of repatriating Viola at £1 million, and restoration costs at £5 million.

In 2006 Viola's original bell was discovered on a farm at Sandefjord. Hull Maritime Museum purchased it and in 2008 returned the bell to the ship.

In 2016 the Viola was surveyed to determine its condition and whether or not it could be refloated and restored.

== See also ==
- Arctic Corsair - Hull's preserved deep water trawler, though of a much more modern breed to that represented through the remarkable survival of the ST Viola
- Ross Tiger - Grimsby's preserved middle water sidewinder — the last of the fleet which once made Grimsby the largest fishing port in the world.
- SM U-96

== Bibliography ==
- Headland, Robert (1984). The Island of South Georgia (Paperback, 1992 ed.). Cambridge University Press. ISBN 0-521-25274-1.
- Robinson, Robb; Hart, Ian (2014). Viola, The Life and Times of a Hull Steam Trawler. Lodestar Books. ISBN 978-1907206276.
