= Radio Dreyeckland =

Coordinates: 47°44′54″N 7°20′23″E

- Mulhouse, France; France

Programming
- Language: French

History
- First air date: early 1979

Links
- Website: www.radiodreyeckland.com

Radio Dreyeckland is a radio station in Mulhouse, Alsace, France. Another station with the same name operates in Freiburg im Breisgau, Germany.

Both stations are successors to Radio Verte Fessenheim which was started by opponents to the Fessenheim Nuclear Power Plant during the 1970s and was renamed 'Dreyeckland' in 1981.

During the eighties and early nineties people from Switzerland were cooperating with the French Dreyeckland running broadcasts aimed at listeners in Basel and its surroundings using the transmitter in France, because they didn't have a license for Switzerland.

Dreyeckland Freiburg in Germany was started as a pirate station in 1985 and has transmitted legally since 1988 as a separate station but in the same spirit as the one from Alsace.

While radio Dreyeckland from southern Alsace developed into a commercial oldies radio during recent years, the German Dreyeckland is still an alternative station. Today's Radio Dreyeckland in southern Alsace is still using the 104.6 MHz of the former alternative station.

== See also ==
- Pirate radio in France
