= Dim Dam Dom =

French television show from 1965 to 1971

- Presented by: Mireille Darc; Nathalie Delon; France Gall; Françoise Hardy; Claude Jade; Marie Laforêt; Sheila; Sylvie Vartan
- Country of origin: France
- Original language: French

Production
- Camera setup: Multi-camera
- Running time: 22–24 minutes

Original release
- Network: ORTF
- Release: 13 March 1965 – March 3, 1971

Dim Dam Dom is a French television show that aired for female audiences on ORTF from March 21, 1965, to March 3, 1971. The show was created by Elle chief editor Daisy de Galard.

== Premise ==
Each episode of Dim Dam Dom was hosted every Sunday by a different television host each week, usually a popular actress or singer. Where they would discuss the latest fashion and music trends. The television show was considered revolutionary and trendy for its time.

The only other show aimed exclusively for a female television audience in the 1960s was Magazine féminin which was mainly aimed at housewives as opposed to young French women which was Dim Dam Dom. The show was praised for its sophistication and production values.
