= MV Ross Revenge =

Former radio ship and commercial trawler

Coordinates: 51.734688°N 0.855515°E

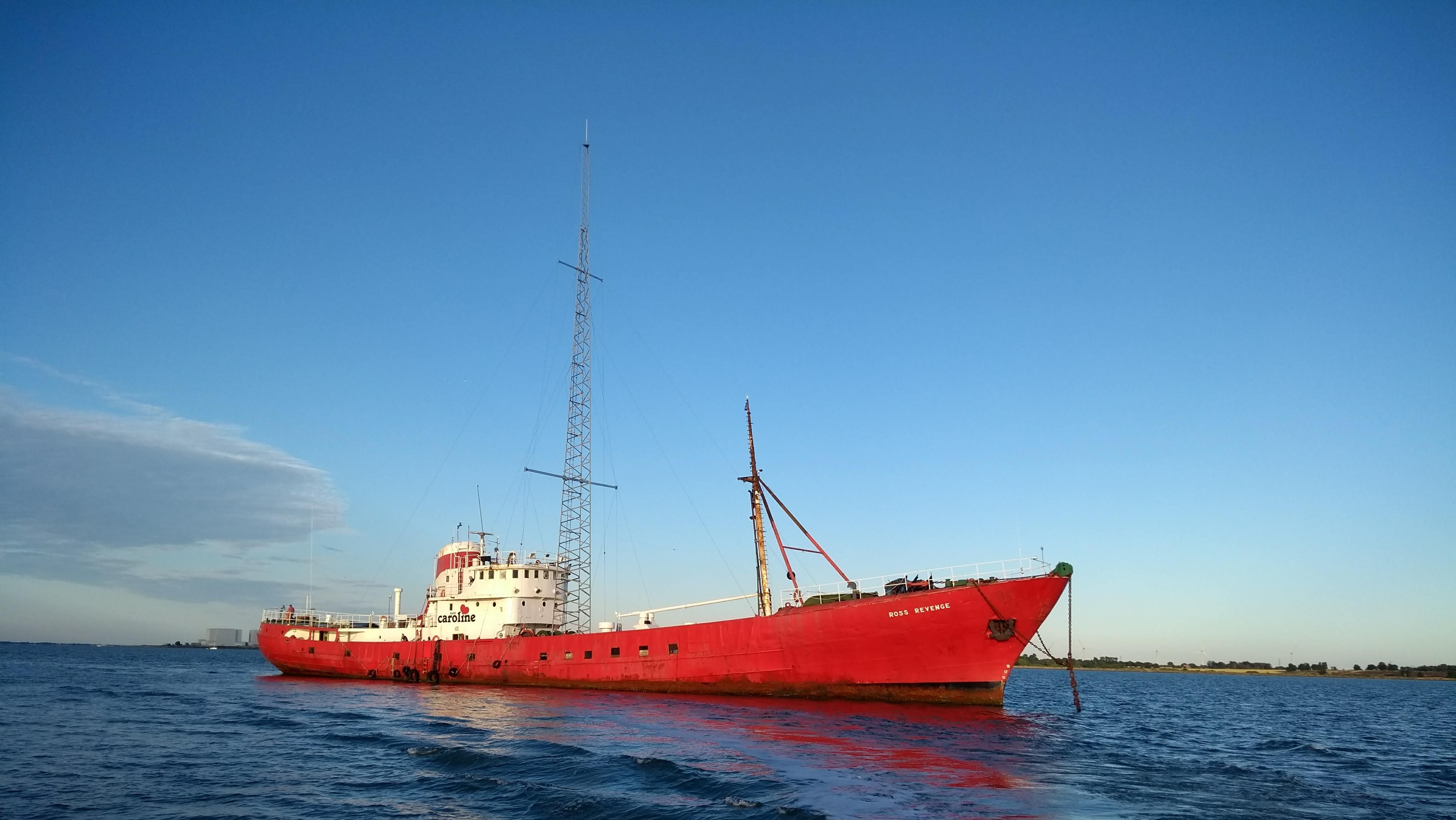
- MV Ross Revenge moored on the Blackwater Estuary in 2018

History

Iceland
- Name: Freyr; Ross Revenge
- Port of registry: (Iceland) Reykjavík
- Builder: Seebeck, Bremerhaven
- Completed: 1960
- In service: 1960-1983 (fishing trawler); 1983-present (radio ship)
- Identification: IMO number: 5121213
- Status: in active service

General characteristics
- Type: Fishing trawler/Radio ship
- Tonnage: 980 GRT
- Length: 67 m (219 ft 10 in)
- Beam: 10.3 m (33 ft 10 in)
- Draught: 6 m (19 ft 8 in)
- Installed power: Werkspoor 10-cylinder Diesel, dual turbine 2,400 hp (1,800 kW)
- Speed: 22 knots (41 km/h; 25 mph)

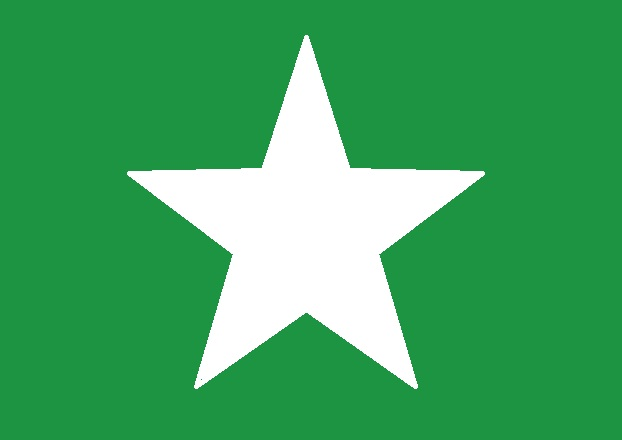
Flag flown by trawlers of the Ross fleet, usually also painted onto the funnel of the ship

MV Ross Revenge is a radio ship, the home of Radio Caroline, as well as having supported Radio Monique and various religious broadcasters. Funded by the Icelandic government, she was constructed in Bremerhaven in 1960 and served as an Icelandic commercial trawler until 1963 when she was sold to the Ross Group fleet, notably taking part in the Cod Wars of the 1970s. Following her decommissioning, she was purchased by Radio Caroline and outfitted as a radio ship, complete with 300-foot (91 m) antenna mast and 50 kW transmitter. Her broadcasts began on 20 August 1983; her final pirate broadcast took place in November 1990. She ran aground on the Goodwin Sands in November 1991, bringing the era of offshore pirate radio in Europe to an end. She was, however, salvaged, and is now maintained by the Caroline Support Group, a group of supporters and enthusiasts.

== Service as a trawler (1960–1983) ==
Freyr was built in Bremerhaven, Germany by Seebeck for the Icelandic government. She was registered in Reykjavík and carried the registration RE 1.

In August 1963 she was sold to Ross Trawlers and renamed Ross Revenge, registration GY 718 (home port Grimsby). In this capacity, the ship was involved in the Cod Wars of the 1970s.

Ross Revenge holds the world record for the biggest catch. In 1976 she landed a catch of 3,000 kits (approximately 218 tonnes) of Icelandic cod at Grimsby, subsequently sold for a world record price of £75,597.

After serving as a diving support ship from 1979 to 1981, she was taken to the Cairnryan breakers' yard in Cairnryan, Wigtownshire, Dumfries and Galloway on the west coast of Scotland, not Rosyth in the Firth of Forth on the Scottish east coast.

== Radio Caroline (1983–1991) ==
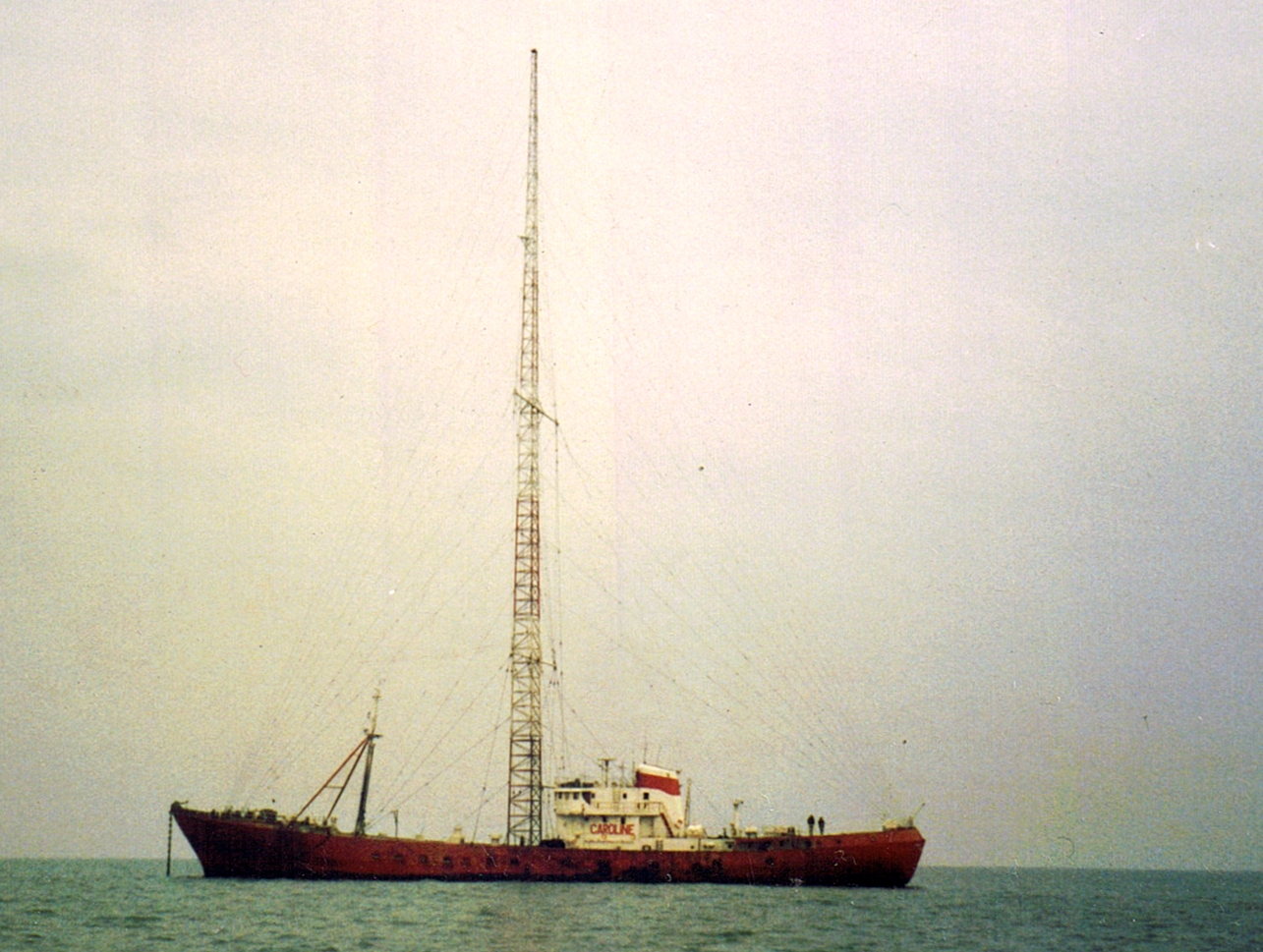
MV Ross Revenge as radio ship in 1984

While moored at the Cairnryan breakers' yard, Ross Revenge was found to be suitable for use in the Radio Caroline project. As a result, Ernst Kunz from Austria a director of Simor Establishment, Liechtenstein purchased Ross Revenge for £28,500. The ship was subsequently registered in Panama to Grothan Steemship Lines, Inc., SA Panama. It is worth noting that both Simor and Grothan were influenced heavily by Ronan O'Rahilly.

In April 1981, Ross Revenge was towed from the Cairnryan breakers' yard, and arrived in Solares five days later. Come Autumn, work began on converting her into a functioning radio ship. Her transmitter mast, at 300 ft (91 m) above sea level, was the tallest mast ever fitted to a ship.

Early in 1982, new investors were found for Radio Caroline. Of these, the principal investor, James Ryan, was later arrested for fraud. Chains he had placed on Ross Revenge would later be removed prior to her drydocking. On 23 September, she was registered as a pleasure craft in Panama with registry number 9625-POXT, and her callsign was HP-4344. In May 1983, Caroline Communications acquired full legal ownership of Ross Revenge, whereafter she was drydocked and given a protective coating. Insurance problems regarding the lifeboats would prevent Ross Revenge from setting sail until 4 August.

=== Ross Revenge sets sail ===
At 15:00 on 4 August 1983, MV Ross Revenge set sail under the command of Captain Martin Eve. Problems with the engines forced the ship to be towed by the Spanish tug 'MV Aznar Jose Luis' to its anchorage. On 8 August 1983, Ross Revenge dropped anchor in the Kentish Knock. The next day, a test transmission was made on 963 kHz, some time after which Ross Revenge shifted anchorage to the Knock John Deep.

On 20 January 1984, Ross Revenge lost her anchor and drifted south onto a sand bank 2 miles (3.2 km) within British waters, and broadcasts were stopped. Broadcasts resumed two days later, at which time she had returned to her anchorage. On 3 March, a force twelve storm necessitated the dragging of the emergency anchor. A new anchor system was installed and operational two days later.

On 10 June 1987, Radio Caroline closed down for "maintenance" at 07:00; in fact, Ross Revenge sailed to a new position near South Falls Head, in anticipation of the forthcoming Territorial Sea Act that extended British territorial waters to 12 miles (19 km) (from 3 miles (4.8 km)). This was announced when broadcasts resumed at 16:54 that day.

On 20 November the same year, the ship started to list to 25° due to exceedingly rough weather. Five days later, force eight storms hit the ship; transmissions ceased abruptly at 02:51. The antenna mast had broken at its base and collapsed into the sea. Other than this, the ship sustained very little damage . The next day, parts were delivered for a makeshift aerial. By 27 January, a new mast had been built, but required adjustment.

=== Logistics ===
From Radio Caroline's inception, small vessels originating from the English coast brought newspapers, discs, crew, and DJs to Ross Revenge. Diesel was brought in weekly from Nieuwpoort via Zeemeeuw, hired in 1984. During and following the "Eurosiege" of 1985, in which the Dutch naval minesweeper HNLMS Makkum was anchored near Ross Revenge, the skipper of Zeemeeuw deemed it too risky to continue ferrying fuel, and so Radio Monique acquired the use of Poolster, again operating from Nieuwpoort. In 1987, they changed to using The Bellatrix, which came out to the Ross for the first time in December 1986, to operate out of Dunkirk.

On 6 November 1988 two new aerial masts were taken out to the Ross Revenge. On 4 January 1989 were taken aboard to give the ship as much stability as possible while erecting the new transmitter masts. On 12 February the front mast had been rebuilt bar one section, and the shortwave aerial had been restored. The work on the two new masts continued until May.

=== Technical Details ===
The Ross Revenge featured 3 transmitters, a 50 kW RCA BTA-50H, serving as the ship's main transmitter. A smaller 10 kW BTA-10H was also installed, originally intended to be a backup for the 50 kW, but was adopted to broadcast a second service from the ship as well. The ship's 5 kW transmitter had an interesting history on board the ship, installed at first as a source of spare parts, but then was converted to broadcast a third shortwave service. After the 1989 raid, both of the primary 50 and 10 kW transmitters suffered damage, with the 50 kW being dismantled and since the 10 kW been smashed to pieces, the 5 kW was put back into action with parts hidden during the raid, albeit on very low power. Power did eventually increase with more parts being sourced, and eventually being put up to 7.5 kW.

The ship's original electrical system was entirely DC based, with the ship having 4 main forms of electrical generation, two Deutz 6 cylinder generators producing 120 kW each, and a smaller MWM harbour generator, producing 35 kW. A shaft generator coming from the ships main engine was also used to produce electrical power. When the ship was converted to a broadcasting vessel, the need came for AC power generation, two 250 KVA generators were installed, with the two sets being swapped in and out of service every week. Usually radio ships had mismatched generators, or only 1 main one. Having 2 identical generators proved useful for maintenance, as parts could simply be swapped.

Plans were made prior to the mast collapse to install another 50 kW transmitter, so a new 500 KVA generator was brought aboard the ship, along with a new main electrical switchboard.

=== Armed raid ===
On 19 August 1989 armed representatives of the Dutch Government boarded Ross Revenge. Volans, a Dutch Water Police tugboat, contained a boarding party of about 30 armed men, including Dutch, British, French and Belgian officials. The boarding party removed studio equipment, records and tapes. The aerial array was taken down, parts of the transmitter were removed, and other components were smashed with sledgehammers.

The staff and DJs were determined to keep the station on the air despite the raid, and on 1 October the station reopened on low power, using a makeshift transmitter and new studio equipment. Broadcasts were initially on low power and the station suffered equipment failures and temporary blackouts, but over the next few months the technical hitches were ironed out and transmitter power was increased.

=== Abandonment and retaking ===
At the end of November 1990, Ross Revenge suffered a power failure, which resulted in the ship being unlit for several nights. Trinity House warned the station that the ship must be lit during the hours of darkness, to comply with maritime regulations. As Ross Revenge was low on fuel, and the main generators had failed due to disuse, a small petrol generator was being used to power the ship. During force nine storms on 10 December Ross Revenge suffered another power failure, the small petrol generator having been thrown around the deck, and the supplies of petrol having been washed over the side by waves. The crew called the station office, who in turn called the Dover Coast Guard. The coast guard contacted the ship, and a helicopter was sent out at 23:00. By 23:45 Ross Revenge was completely evacuated.

The next day the crew from the Trinity House vessel Patricia boarded Ross Revenge, checked the stores and general condition of the ship and then left. By dawn the Dover Coast Guard were reporting that Ross Revenge was abandoned. North Foreland Radio and other coastal stations issued hourly reports warning shipping vessels that Ross Revenge was unmanned and unlit. On 14 December a successful boarding attempt was made, and at approximately 11:00 Peter Chicago (main engineer) regained control of Ross Revenge. He was joined by Tony Collis, who had advised Chicago of rumours of foreign tugs on their way to claim Ross Revenge for salvage.

== Ross Revenge runs aground ==
On 19 November 1991, storms built up across Europe. Consequently, very high seas with north easterly winds were experienced by the crew of Ross Revenge. By the early hours of the next morning force ten storms were battering Ross Revenge, and eventually the main anchoring system failed. Dover Coast Guard asked other sea traffic to confirm that the ship they were tracking was the Ross Revenge. At 03:50 Ross Revenge grounded on the Goodwin Sands. The crew contacted Dover Coast Guard and a helicopter was sent from RAF Manston, and at 04:45 the Dover tug Dextrous was on her way. At 05:35 the crew of Ross Revenge made contact with the Ramsgate lifeboat, which had also been sent by the Dover Coast Guard. At 06:58 the lifeboat became stuck on the Goodwin Sands, but her crew managed to free her. At 06:57 hours RAF Manston Sea King helicopter 166 took the crew of Ross Revenge off the ship. On 21 November, Dextrous managed to get lines on Ross Revenge and successfully pulled the radio ship off the Goodwin Sands next day. Ross Revenge was then towed back to the Eastern Docks at Dover.

Following the near shipwrecking, the ship has been maintained by an association of enthusiasts called the Caroline Support Group (formerly, the Ross Revenge Support Group).

In October 1993 Ross Revenge was anchored off Bradwell-On-Sea in the Blackwater Estuary in Essex, within sight of the Bradwell nuclear power station. In August 1995 Ross Revenge was towed to Clacton-on-Sea. In September the vessel was moored near Southend-on-Sea and in the middle of that month it was moored at the end of Southend Pier. On 25 September Ross Revenge was towed from Southend to the Thames Quay, West India Docks in Docklands, London, by the tugs Horton and Warrior. In February 1996 the ship was towed from South quay, Docklands towards Ailsa Perth Marine's shipyard at Chatham, Kent, and put into dry dock. In August 1997 MV Ross Revenge was moved to Queenbourgh, Isle of Sheppey, by the tugs Lady Morag and Lady Brenda. On 21 June 1999 the ship was towed to Southend-on-Sea Pier. The ship left Southend on 28 September under tow from the tug Horton, and was moored on the River Medway in Kent at ship berth No. 24.

On Christmas Eve 1999, MV Ross Revenge, still anchored in the River Medway, broke its moorings during high winds and ran aground on a sandbank. Two tugs were radioed by another ship moored nearby and managed to pull Ross Revenge off the bank and tow it into Sheerness harbour. The two people on board were both unhurt. Although the ship was not badly damaged, the salvage was extremely expensive. On 8 January 2000 the vessel was moved back onto the moorings at Queenborough on the Isle of Sheppey. From 29 July 2003 Ross Revenge was moored on the River Medway at Strood/Rochester, just downstream from Rochester Bridge.

== Present day ==
Restoration work on Ross Revenge continues; in August 2004, the vessel was used for (legitimate) Radio Caroline broadcasts on 1278 kHz, while berthed on the River Thames at Tilbury, funded by the UK National Lottery organisation. As is usual with Restricted Service Licence broadcasts, transmission power was restricted to one watt. Following broadcasts, she remained berthed at Tilbury, and restoration continued on the secondary studio (Radio Monique's former studio), which was reconstructed. General restoration and refitting of the ship took place during 2004–2006, including the fitting of a new central heating boiler, improvements to the electrical system, repainting of the ship, and refurbishment of the mess room and crew quarters. During 2013, a new transmitter mast was erected. Ross Revenge left the River Thames at Tilbury on 31 July 2014. Her new mooring is on the Blackwater Estuary near Bradwell, Essex.

From 2015, "Radio Caroline North" has broadcast 'live' from the Ross Revenge, usually on the second or third weekend of the calendar month and on offshore music-radio anniversary dates, courtesy of Manx Radio's 1368 kHz (219 metres) AM 20 kW transmitter on the Isle of Man. On 31 May 2017, Ross Revenge was included in the National Register of Historic Vessels, "It is believed she is the last example of a distant water side trawler and the only remaining pirate radio ship in the world. She is significant as she remains as she was built, only with the addition of radio broadcasting equipment, which remains in place." On Friday 22 December 2017, Radio Caroline launched a new 24 hours per day AM service on 648 kHz (463 metres) Medium Wave for Suffolk and North Essex with a series of special programmes broadcast from the Ross Revenge; the transmitters are land-based, with the audio coming from the ship's studios.

== See also ==
- Ross Tiger Preserved trawler of the Ross fleet, berthed at Grimsby's National Fishing Heritage Centre
