= Rinovia Steam Fishing Company =

English fishing company

Rinovia Steam Fishing Company Ltd. was a large fishing company operating from Grimsby, Lincolnshire, England. It specialized in deep-water fishing in the Icelandic grounds, and was responsible for handling Icelandic vessels landing their catch in Grimsby. It was also closely associated with the Icelandic consulate in Grimsby. Its trawlers bore a logo consisting of the fluttering flag of Iceland on their grey funnel.

== Business history ==
The firm was founded in the 1930s by J.R. ("Joe") Cobley and Paul Adalsteinsson MBE (director also of Abunda Fishing Co.), and had close associations with N. Rogers and T. Little. Several of its trawlers were requisitioned by the Royal Navy in World War II for minesweeping duties and were lost, most notably the first Rinovia, a well-known wreck on The Manacles off Falmouth, Cornwall. Most of the ships (but not the Rinovia itself) bore the names of coastal locations in Iceland.

The company had a subsidiary in Grimsby, Thickett's, which made specialized fishing equipment such as trawl boards.

The firm was absorbed by the major fishing and food company The Ross Group in 1960-1, and the ships continued to fish in the Ross fleet. The historic name lived on in Rinovia Building, Farringdon Road, Fish Docks, Grimsby, which formerly housed its offices, but this has now been demolished.

== Record catch ==
Grimsby's first £1m annual catch was brought home by skipper Paul Adalsteinsson MBE of the Andanes (see below).

== Known trawlers of the firm ==
trawler	reg num	launched	career	fate	
Alsey	GY 460	1932	originally belonged to Alsey Steam Fishing Co.	scrapped 1963	image
Andanes	GY 53	1949	became Ross Fighter (1961), then Grimsby's only conventional freezer trawler, then became Ross Ramillies (1966)	scrapped 1979	image
Blakkur	GY 378	1931	renamed Rinovia	converted to minesweeper and sunk in World War II	image
Drangey	GY 126	1935		?disposed of to Admiralty 1939 or 1940, after World War II became GY 280 Mildenhall, lost 1948 on Russian coast	
Inganes	GY 46	1951, having previously been owned by another firm in which J.B. Cobley had an interest		scrapped 1953	
?Langanes					
King Sol	GY 338		successful trip in 1949		image
Kirknes	GY 28	1949			image
Kopanes	GY 1		bought before completion by Northern Trawlers and entered service as Northern Jewel.	scrapped 1978	painting by Steve Fuller
Rinovia	GY 527	1948	became Ross Stalker (1961), then Ross Resolution (1966)	sold on privately and lost off Australia	image
Sletnes	GY 526	1947/8	radically rebuilt by G.F. Sleight's for Rinovia from a German naval torpedo boat Larwot (so named on confiscation by the Royal Navy in 1945), which had previously been the trawler Mars	believed scrapped 1960	image
Stafnes	GY 172		served as an admiralty trawler 1939-45; became Ross Searcher (1961)		image
