= Radio Monique =

- North Sea (offshore); Netherlands
- Broadcast area: Netherlands, Belgium
- Frequencies: 963 kHz (1984–1987), 819 kHz (1987)
- Branding: Radio Monique

Programming
- Language: Dutch
- Format: Pop music, news

Ownership
- Owner: Fred Bolland

History
- First air date: 16 December 1984
- Last air date: November 1987

Links
- Website: radiomoniqueinternationaal.nl

Radio Monique was an offshore radio station broadcasting to the Netherlands and Belgium from the Radio Caroline ship, MV Ross Revenge.

Originally intended to broadcast in 1981 from a new radio ship called MV Magda Maria alongside a station to be called Radio Paradijs, this arrangement fell through and Radio Paradijs never did make it to air, except for some test transmissions. On the way over to Europe the ship lost part of its aerial. Shortly after commencing tests, the Dutch navy towed the ship away.

On December 1984, Ronan O'Rahilly of Radio Caroline leased the 50 kW transmitter aboard the Ross Revenge to the Dutch businessman Fred Bolland. With that transmitter, Bolland started his station, which he named Radio Monique after his ex-wife. In fact, following antenna problems, the station began test transmissions on 15 December 1984 and commenced full programming at midday the following day on 963 kHz. Radio Caroline had broadcast for over a year from the Ross Revenge but failed to attract enough advertising to be able to continue alone.

A special studio was also established in the Gooi, where experienced radio professionals, including Joost den Draayer and Tony Berk, contributed to the programming. Additional content was provided by a live team of disc jockeys.

Over the next two years, Radio Monique experienced a high turnover of deejays. The reasons for leaving varied: agreements not kept, poor living conditions on board, salaries not received or too little, or simply a lack of qualities in the deejay concerned.

The station's theme tune was an edited version of the Theme from Terrahawks by Richard Harvey.

In October 1987 Radio Monique was sold and a month later moved to 819 kHz. This move was necessary because Finland had started up a new 600 kW transmitter on 963 kHz. Nico van der Stee (also known as Nico Volkert), who had been involved in the early operations of Radio Monique, entered into direct discussions with Ronan O'Rahilly regarding the future of the station and a major advertiser, Texas Cigarettes. The company had made a significant financial investment, and it was subsequently agreed that Volkert would oversee Radio 819 alongside Gert-Jan Smit, who was responsible for religious programming on Radio Caroline. On 24 November 1987, O'Rahilly informed Bolland of these developments. Bolland requested to remain involved with the new station in a supply role under a salary arrangement.

Shortly after, during a storm on 25 November 1987, the aerial mast broke on board the Ross Revenge. Caroline returned fairly quickly with a makeshift aerial but was initially unable to offer Monique a sufficient quality service. In May 1988, another station with Dutch language programming was launched from the Ross Revenge under the name Radio 558, later Radio 819. This was largely seen as the successor to Radio Monique, as it contained many of the same programmes, advertisers and disc jockeys.

In 2020, Fred Bolland and several former employees ensured the station's return, this time from land on AM 918 kHz. Since 2021, the station has also been available online.
