= Conseil supérieur de l'audiovisuel =

French media regulation authority

- Last logo of the Conseil supérieur de l'audiovisuel
- Industry: Administration publique générale (General Public Administration)
- Predecessor: National Commission for Communication and Liberties
- Founded: 17 January 1989
- Defunct: 31 December 2021
- Fate: The CSA was merged with the HADOPI law to create the Regulatory Authority for Audiovisual and Digital Communication.
- Successor: Regulatory Authority for Audiovisual and Digital Communication

The Conseil supérieur de l'audiovisuel (French: [kɔ̃sɛj sypeʁjœʁ də lɔdjɔvizɥɛl], lit. 'Superior Audiovisual Council'), abbreviated CSA, was a French institution created in 1989 whose role was to regulate the various electronic media in France, such as radio and television. The creation of the Haute Autorité de la Communication Audiovisuelle (High Authority for Audiovisual Communication) was a measure founded in the Socialist Party's electoral program of 1981, called 110 Propositions for France.

The CSA replaced the Commission Nationale de la Communication et des Libertés (CNCL), which itself replaced the High Authority for Audiovisual Communication, created in 1982 to supervise the attribution of radio frequencies to the private radio sector, which was judged better than allowing the anarchic creation of the radios libres ("free radios"), mainly composed of amateurs and NGOs.

The CSA always acted after content was shown on a TV channel or heard on a radio, so it was not an instance of preventative censorship . Notably, the CSA asked the Government of France to forbid Al-Manar TV in 2005 because of charges of hate speech; it also claimed that MED TV was close to the Kurdish PKK, on grounds not of "evidences" but of "concording elements".

On 24 September 2019, Franck Riester announced that the bill relating to audiovisual communication and cultural sovereignty in the digital age examined by the National Assembly in the first half of 2020 would include the merger of the CSA and HADOPI to form the Regulatory Authority for Audiovisual and Digital Communication (Autorité de régulation de la communication audiovisuelle et numérique; ARCOM). The bill is put on hold until 8 April 2022 when it is presented to the Council of Ministers under the name "bill relating to the regulation and protection of access to cultural works in the digital age". The merger became effective on 1 January 2022.

== Last members ==
(as of December 2021)

- Roch-Olivier Maistre (president)
- Carole Bienaimé-Besse
- Nicolas Curien
- Hervé Godechot
- Michèle Léridon
- Jean-François Mary
- Nathalie Sonnac

== Pictograms ==
The following pictograms are proposed to the different TV channels. Channels are responsible for displaying the right pictogram depending on the show and its time of broadcast. Note that –18 can be either non-pornographic (like the movie Ken Park) or pornographic.

Discouraged to persons under 10

Discouraged to persons under 12

Discouraged to persons under 16

Discouraged to persons under 18

== See also ==
- Pirate radio in France
- Conseil supérieur de l'audiovisuel (Belgium)
