= Young's Seafood =

British fish company

Young's Seafood Ltd.
- Type: Private
- Industry: food
- Founded: 1805
- Headquarters: Ross House, Wickham Road, Grimsby, England
- Key people: Simon Smith, CEO
- Products: food
- Owner: Sofina Foods as of 2022
- Number of employees: 3,000
- Subsidiaries: Young's Retail, Young's Foodservice
- Website: youngsseafood.co.uk

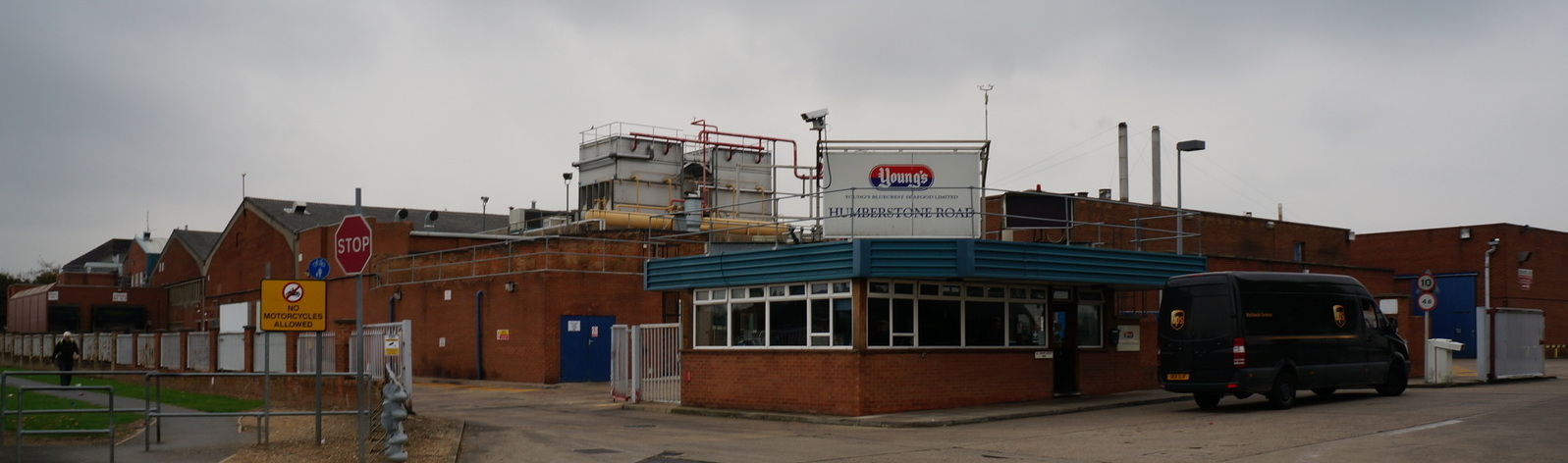
Young's Seafood Factory in Old Clee

Young's Seafood Ltd. is a British producer and distributor of frozen, fresh, and chilled seafood headquartered in Grimsby, England.

It was formed through the merger of Young's and Bluecrest in 1999. It is currently owned by Sofina Foods Inc., a Canada-based food manufacturing group, following a number of years as a portfolio company of various private equity owners.

== History ==
Prior to the merger with Bluecrest, Young's itself had been the result of a number of takeovers and management buyouts.

=== Early history ===
The 1805 foundation of Young's is based on that being the year when one Elizabeth Martha began selling fish on the Greenwich quays. In 1811, Martha married William Timothy Young, a member of a fishing family based on the River Thames since the mid-18th century, thus combining their fishing and selling businesses. The business prospered and later moved downriver to Leigh-on-Sea.

By the end of the 19th century the business, under William Joseph Young, had become a prominent fish merchanting and wholesaling company, operating its own fleet of small boats primarily for fishing whitebait and shrimp. In 1890, the company moved its headquarters to London to begin to supply the city's catering market.

Young's expanded throughout the 1920s, becoming one of the first companies in England to import salmon and debuting the company's most successful product, potted shrimps.

The next generation of the Young family - brothers Gordon, Stanley, Douglas, and Malcolm - took over in the late 1930s and set up a new subsidiary for its wholesaling business. Another subsidiary added dockside purchasing and processing operations in Grimsby, which later emerged as the United Kingdom's (and for a time, the world's) busiest fishing port. By the 1950s, the company had built five production facilities for its potted shrimp production.

=== Takeovers by the Ross Group and Imperial Tobacco ===
1959 marked the end of Young's independence, after the company was purchased by the larger Ross Group. Young's, however, maintained its own operations, and especially its nationally known brand name, and members of the Young family remained in charge of the company's direction.

Ross's and Young's frozen foods operations grew strongly through the 1960s. A new network of distribution depots was set up, and a number of wholesalers throughout the country were acquired. By the middle of the decade the group's share of the UK's frozen food sector topped 5 percent in the retail channel, and as much as 13 percent in the catering market.

The Ross Group's trawling operations, however, were losing money throughout the decade and, in 1969, the group agreed to be acquired by Imperial Tobacco - as part of which process Ross's trawling business was spun off into British United Trawlers. Ross was renamed Imperial Foods (a division of the newly renamed Imperial Group) but both the Ross and Young's names survived as independently operating divisions of the new company.

As part of Imperial, Young's invested to expand capacity and developed a new centralized distribution system. By the middle of the 1970s, Young's sales had more than doubled, topping £23 million in 1974, and the company was operating 18 factories.

=== The Hanson and United Biscuits Eras ===
By the mid-1980s, however, Imperial was caught in an era of hostile takeovers, becoming the target of a number of companies including United Biscuits Plc (UB). UB lost out to fast-growing conglomerate Hanson in its attempt to acquire Imperial, but Hanson was interested only in Imperial's tobacco holdings and sold Ross Young's to UB in 1988. Under UB's ownership, Young's was redeveloped as a standalone division. However, by the late 1990s, UB was restructuring its business to focus on core brands.

=== Bluecrest ===
Bluecrest, founded in 1975 by Frank Flear, was a British manufacturer and processor of fish products based in Grimsby, England, UK. It was acquired by Fitch Lovell in 1985 and in 1990 it was sold to Booker Plc, which also had acquired the Ross fish division from Hanson. The two companies were merged to form Booker's Fish Division. In 1999 Booker sold Bluecrest to a management buyout of rival Young's Seafood, backed by Legal & General Ventures (LGV).

Once combined with LGV's other UK seafood group the newly created Young's Bluecrest became the UK's leading specialist fish business.

=== Buyouts and acquisitions ===
In 2000, Young's Bluecrest relaunched the Young's branded products and invested in increased production capacity. By then turning over more than £320 million, the company also began an expansion strategy, designed to consolidate the British fish sector.

LGV, however, declined to back this expansion, and instead, in 2002, sold Young's Bluecrest to a new management buyout, this time backed by CapVest, a European investment firm. The newly capitalised company made its first acquisition (of the chilled seafood division of Albert Fisher, based in Newcastle), in June 2003. Purchases of the Pinegain Group and its Marr Foods division followed in October 2003; and Young's bought a 34 percent stake in Macrae Food Group, the largest dedicated producer of ready-to-eat seafood in Scotland in September 2004. Expansion and refurbishment of its Humber, Grimsby and Edinburgh operations followed during 2005 and 2006.

The acquisition of the UK-based Findus operations from EQT AB in January 2006 boosted Young's total sales to an estimated £1 billion ($1.7 billion), confirming the company's position as the leader in the UK frozen fish sector, having surpassed rivals Bird's Eye, then owned by Permira.

CapVest sold Young's in 2008 to Lion Capital, another UK private equity sponsor, in a deal valuing Young's at £1,100,000,000.. After over a decade of ownership by Lion Capital, Young's returned to CapVest's control in 2019, with CapVest grouping it with Karro Food Group, another portfolio company focusing in the pork products sector under the Eight Fifty Food Group brand.

In October 2020, it acquired Germany-headquartered AliSa International GmbH, which trades as Greenland Seafood. Eight Fifty Food Group also, during late 2020, took steps to explore a potential listing of its shares in London; however this was ultimately shelved in favour of a private sale to Sofina Foods Inc., a Canadian food conglomorate, in early 2021.

== Market areas ==
Most of the group's sales are of its Young's brand of frozen and chilled fish, shrimp, and shellfish. The company is also the owner of Macrae in Scotland.

The Young's Foodservice subsidiary focuses on the restaurant and catering industry whilst Polarfrost Seafoods specializes in fish frozen at sea.

Sister business, The Seafood Company, now specialises in chilled fish for UK retailers own label.

== Sponsorship ==
Young's was the official sponsor of Grimsby Town F.C., taking over the kit sponsorship from the final home match of the 2003–2004 football season. For the 2004–2005 season, the clubs yellow away strip had the product logo for "Youngs Mariners Pie", to tie in with Grimsby Town's club nickname "The Mariners". At the end of the 2021–22 season it was announced that Grimsby would not be renewing the sponsorship deal after an 18-year spell as the club's primary kit sponsor.
