= Bluecrest Wellness =

British healthcare company

- Company type: Private
- Industry: Healthcare
- Founded: 2012
- Headquarters: Worthing, West Sussex, United Kingdom
- Area served: United Kingdom
- Services: Preventive Health Screenings
- Number of employees: 50+
- Website: UK

Bluecrest Wellness is a privately run health screening company founded in the UK in 2012 and based in Worthing, West Sussex.

== Operations and services ==
Bluecrest offer a range of screenings in the UK and Ireland to both consumer and corporate clients; clinics are set up at mobile sites across the country.

Food manufacturer Danone UK offers free annual health checks to all of its staff via Bluecrest. Hertfordshire County Council makes the offer to all its employees but through a salary sacrifice scheme. Other clients include Capita.

== Awards ==
The company was named Healthcare and Wellbeing Provider of Year in the Workplace Savings & Benefits Awards 2016 by Incisive Media.
