= Grimsby Fishing Heritage Centre =

Maritime museum in Grimsby, England

Coordinates: 53.5691°N 0.0839°W

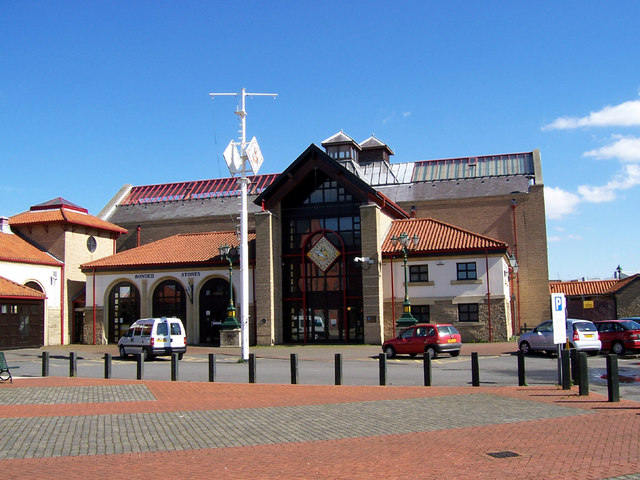
Grimsby Fishing Heritage Centre

The Grimsby Fishing Heritage Centre is a heritage attraction at Alexandra Dock, Grimsby, Lincolnshire, England, opened in 1991. The attraction is an Arts Council England Accredited Museum and holds a number of awards, including the TripAdvisor Hall of Fame, the Sandford Award for Heritage Education and the VisitEngland Quality Rose Marque.

The centre was famed for its multi-sensory interpretation and lifelike manequins when it opened, winning the Attraction of the Year from the English Tourism Board and the Blue Peter Children's Museum of the Year award in 1993. It depicts the 1950s heyday of Great Grimsby's world famous fishing fleet, using displays consisting of preserved trawler interiors and carefully crafted recreations.

== Fishing vessels ==
The centre is also home to three historic fishing vessels. Perseverance is a sail trawler built in Boston Lincolnshire and is displayed in the main atrium of the museum. Ross Tiger is a 1957 side-trawler that is moored in the Alexandra Dock outside of the attraction. The G.I.C., or Esther, is a large Grimsby sail trawler, built in 1888 at Alexandra Dock, close to the attraction.

Tours of the Ross Tiger are available throughout the year, as well as a programme of temporary exhibitions in the attractions three gallery spaces.

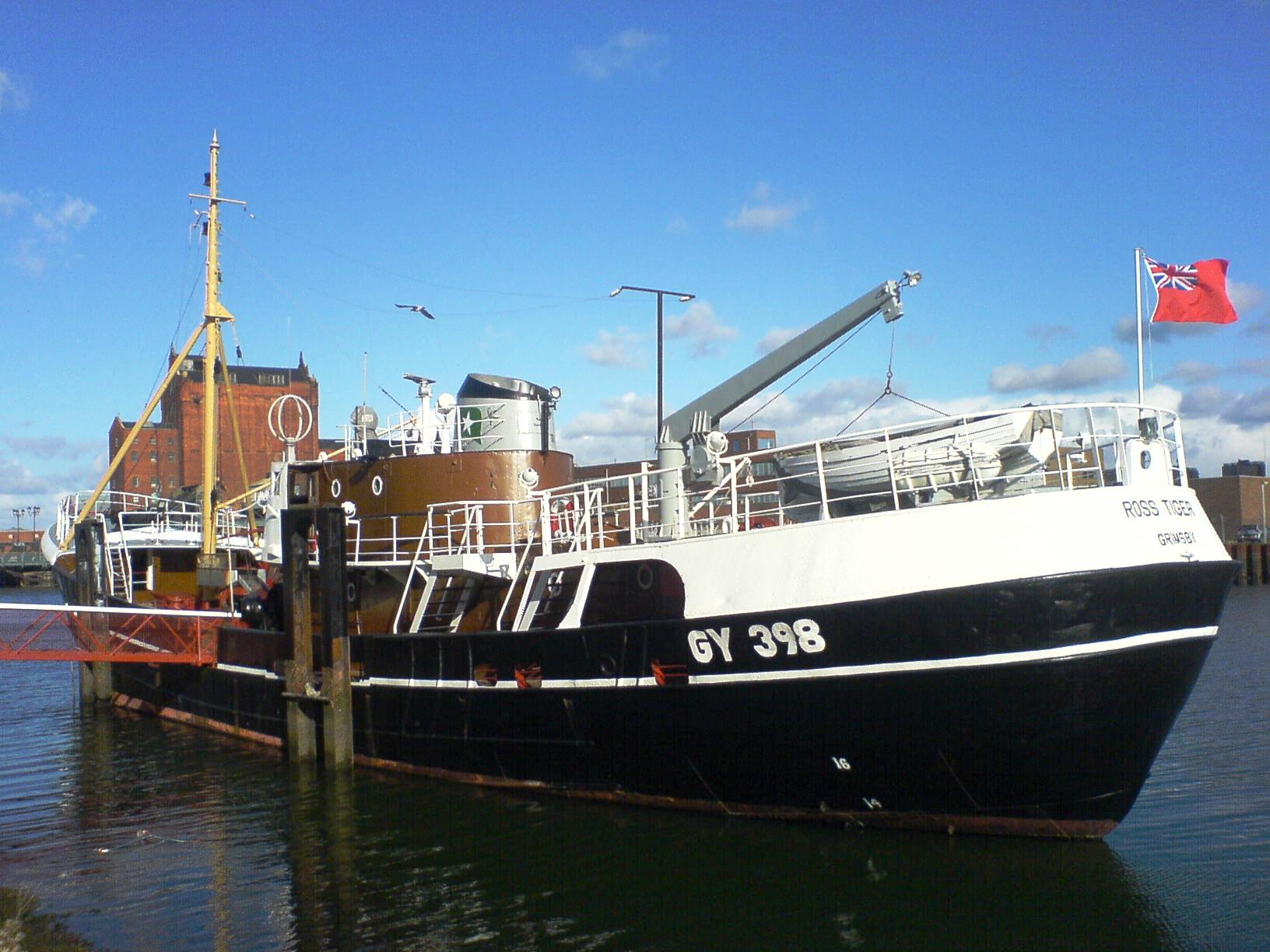
Ross Tiger moored in Grimsby's Alexandra Dock by the Grimsby Fishing Heritage Centre
