= National Commission for Communication and Liberties =

French broadcast communications regulator, 1986–1989

The National Commission for Communication and Liberties (Commission nationale de la communication et des libertés or CNCL) was a TV and radio regulatory body set up in France in 1986 as the successor to the Haute Autorité de la communication audiovisuelle, and dissolved in 1989 to be followed by the Conseil supérieur de l'audiovisuel.
