= 1967 in British radio =

This is a list of events in British radio during 1967.

== Events ==
=== January ===
- No events

=== February ===
- 8 February – Radio City (pirate radio station) closes down at midnight, Shivering Sands Army Fort, from where it has been broadcasting, having been found to be within British territorial waters.

=== March ===
- Disc jockey John Ravenscroft returns to the UK from California, joins the offshore 'pirate radio' station Wonderful Radio London and adopts the name John Peel.

=== April ===
- No events

=== May ===
- John Peel's after-midnight show on pirate station Radio London becomes The Perfumed Garden and, contrary to the station's daytime "Fab 40" playlist, he introduces his eclectic mix of folk, blues, psychedelic and progressive rock which continues until the station is forced off the air in August and Peel moves to BBC Radio 1.
- 20 May – Kenny Everett previews The Beatles' album Sgt. Pepper's Lonely Hearts Club Band on BBC Light Programme show Where It's At, playing almost all the tracks. The BBC refuse to air "A Day in the Life" for alleged "drug references" in the lyrics.
- 30 May – Where It's At features The Beatles interviews and John Lennon's comedy intro to "Lucy in the Sky with Diamonds".

=== June ===
- No events

=== July ===
- No events

=== August ===
- 2 August – Tony Blackburn makes his debut appearance on BBC radio, as the Wednesday presenter of the lunchtime record programme Midday Spin on the Light Programme.
- 14 August – The Marine Broadcasting Offences Act 1967 is passed, making it an offence to advertise or supply an offshore radio station from the UK. This results in the closure of all of Britain's offshore pirate radio stations with the exception of Radio Caroline, which moves its supply operation to the Netherlands.

=== September ===
- 16 September – Sir Malcolm Sargent, having missed most of the BBC Proms season through ill-health, is replaced as conductor of the Last Night of the Proms by Colin Davis, but appears on stage at the end of the concert. Monica Sinclair is the guest soloist for "Rule, Britannia". Sargent dies 17 days later.
- 17 September – First broadcast of The World This Weekend on the BBC Home Service.
- 30 September – BBC Radio completely restructures its national programming: the Light Programme is split between new pop station Radio 1 (modelled on the pirate station Radio London) and middle of the road Radio 2; the cultural Third Programme and the Music Programme are rebranded as Radio 3; and the primarily-talk Home Service becomes Radio 4. Radios 1 and 2 are launched at 5:30am, with both stations simulcasting Breakfast Special, hosted by Paul Hollingdale, before Radio 1 splits at 7am, with Tony Blackburn's Daily Disc Delivery. Radio 3 launches at 8am, with Record Review, presented by Joan Chissell, and Radio 4 starts at 6:35am, with Farming Today.

=== October ===
- 1 October – The first Peel Session for BBC Radio 1 takes place, featuring psychedelic rock band Tomorrow.

=== November ===
- 8 November – BBC Local Radio starts. The first station is BBC Radio Leicester.

=== December ===
- 22 December – Panel game Just a Minute is first aired on Radio 4 with Nicholas Parsons as chairman (initially as a temporary stand-in); Parsons continues to chair the show until shortly before his death in 2020.

=== Unknown ===
- University Radio York obtains a testing and development licence as "Radio Heslington"; it becomes the United Kingdom's second student radio station, and also the country's first independent radio station.

== Station debuts ==
- 30 September
  - BBC Radio 1
  - BBC Radio 2
  - BBC Radio 3
  - BBC Radio 4
- 8 November – BBC Radio Leicester
- 15 November – BBC Radio Sheffield
- 22 November – BBC Radio Merseyside
- Unknown – University Radio York

== Programme debuts ==
- May – The Perfumed Garden on Radio London (1967)
- 1 October – The Official Chart on BBC Radio 2 (1967–Present)
- 22 December – Just a Minute on BBC Radio 4 (1967–Present)

== Changes of network affiliation ==
| Shows | Moved from | Moved to |
|---|---|---|
| A Book at Bedtime | BBC Light Programme | BBC Radio 4 |

== Continuing radio programmes ==
=== 1940s ===
- Sunday Half Hour (1940–2018)
- Desert Island Discs (1942–Present)
- Family Favourites (1945–1980)
- Down Your Way (1946–1992)
- Letter from America (1946–2004)
- Woman's Hour (1946–Present)
- Twenty Questions (1947–1976)
- Any Questions? (1948–Present)
- The Dales (1948–1969)
- Billy Cotton Band Show (1949–1968)
- A Book at Bedtime (1949–Present)

=== 1950s ===
- The Archers (1950–Present)
- Listen with Mother (1950–1982)
- From Our Own Correspondent (1955–Present)
- Pick of the Pops (1955–Present)
- The Clitheroe Kid (1957–1972)
- My Word! (1957–1988)
- Test Match Special (1957–Present)
- The Today Programme (1957–Present)
- The Navy Lark (1959–1977)
- Sing Something Simple (1959–2001)
- Your Hundred Best Tunes (1959–2007)

=== 1960s ===
- Farming Today (1960–Present)
- In Touch (1961–Present)
- The Men from the Ministry (1962–1977)
- I'm Sorry, I'll Read That Again (1964–1973)
- Petticoat Line (1965–1979)
- Round the Horne (1965–1968)
- The World at One (1965–Present)

== Ending this year ==
- 10 January – Have A Go (1946–1967)
- August – The Perfumed Garden (1967)
- September – Easy Beat (1960–1967)
- 29 September – Housewives' Choice (1946–1967)
- 29 September – Music While You Work (1940–1967)

== Closing this year ==
- 8 February – Radio City (1964–1967)
- 14 August
  - Wonderful Radio London (1964–1967)
  - Radio 270 (1966–1967)
  - Radio Scotland (1965–1967)
- 30 September
  - BBC Home Service (1939–1967)
  - BBC Light Programme (1945–1967)
  - BBC Third Programme (1946–1967)

== Births ==
- 7 January – Mark Lamarr, comedian and radio and television presenter
- 2 February – Tushar Makwana, radio presenter (died 2004)
- 25 February – Jonathan Freedland, journalist
- 1 March – Jackie Brambles, English television and radio presenter
- 25 April – Tim Davie, Director-General of the BBC
- 12 July – Richard Herring, comedian
- 27 November – Rosie Cavaliero, Brazilian-born actress
- Unknown
  - Jamie Owen, Welsh radio and television presenter
  - Ritula Shah, radio presenter

== Deaths ==
- 1 June – Derek McCulloch, children's radio presenter (born 1897)
- December – Douglas Ritchie, radio news editor and wartime propaganda broadcaster (born 1905)

== See also ==
- 1967 in British music
- 1967 in British television
- 1967 in the United Kingdom
- List of British films of 1967
