= 1967 in British music =

This is a summary of 1967 in music in the United Kingdom.

== Events ==
- 15 January – The Rolling Stones appear on The Ed Sullivan Show in the United States. At Sullivan's request, the band change the lyrics of "Let's Spend the Night Together" to "Let's spend some time together".
- 17 January – The Daily Mail newspaper reports 4,000 potholes in Blackburn, Lancashire; this article, along with a follow-up article on the death of Guinness heir Tara Brown in a car accident, inspires lyrics for The Beatles song "A Day in the Life".
- 30 January – The Beatles shoot a promotional film for their forthcoming single "Strawberry Fields Forever" at Knole Park in Sevenoaks.
- 3 February – UK record producer Joe Meek murders his landlady and then commits suicide by shooting himself in the head at Holloway, North London.
- 7 February – Micky Dolenz of the Monkees meets Paul McCartney at his home in St John's Wood, London, and they pose together for the press. His impressions of the visit feature in the lyrics of "Randy Scouse Git".
- 10 February – Abbey Road Studio 2 session with Michael Nesmith and other friends in attendance as The Beatles record "A Day in the Life" with the London Philharmonic Orchestra performing an "orgasm of noise" featured twice in the song.
- 12 February – Police raid 'Redlands', the Sussex home of Keith Richards in the early hours of the morning following a tip-off about a party from the News of the World; although no arrests are made at the time, Richards, Mick Jagger and art dealer Robert Fraser are subsequently charged with possession of drugs.
- 13 February – The Beatles' "Penny Lane" and "Strawberry Fields Forever" are released as a double A-side single by EMI.
- 24 February – The Bee Gees sign a management contract with Robert Stigwood (who has just joined with NEMS).
- March – Disc jockey John Ravenscroft returns to the UK from California, joins the offshore "pirate" radio station Wonderful Radio London and adopts the name John Peel.
- 1 March – Inaugural concert of the Queen Elizabeth Hall on London's South Bank, which includes the premieres of Arthur Bliss's River Music, and Benjamin Britten's "Hankin Booby", later to be incorporated in his Suite on English Folk Tunes.
- 3 March – Eric Burdon & The Animals refuse to perform a show in Ottawa, Ontario, unless they are paid in advance. The audience of 3000 riots, causing $5000 in damages to the auditorium.
- 4 March – The Monkees release their latest single, "Randy Scouse Git", inspired by Micky Dolenz's recent visit to London. Having seen Till Death Us Do Part on TV while there, he uses the term "Randy Scouse Git" from the programme for the title of the single, not realising it is an offensive term. The title is changed to "Alternate Title" in the UK, where it reaches #2 in the chart (#1 in the Melody Maker chart).
- 11 March – A taped appearance by The Beatles on American Bandstand includes their new music video for the songs "Penny Lane" and "Strawberry Fields Forever".
- 25 March – The Who perform their first concert in the United States, in New York City.
- 27 March – John Lennon and Paul McCartney are awarded the Ivor Novello award for "Michelle", the most performed song in Britain in 1966.
- 30 March – The Beatles pose with a photographic collage and wax figures from Madame Tussaud's famous museum for the cover artwork of Sgt. Pepper's Lonely Hearts Club Band album (designed by Peter Blake and Jann Haworth) at Chelsea Manor Studios in London.
- 31 March – Kicking off a tour with The Walker Brothers, Cat Stevens and Engelbert Humperdinck at The Astoria London, Jimi Hendrix sets fire to his guitar on stage for the first time. He is taken to hospital suffering burns to his hands but the guitar-burning act will become a trademark of Hendrix's performances.
- 8 April – The 12th Eurovision Song Contest is held in the Hofburg Imperial Palace, Vienna, Austria. The United Kingdom wins the contest for the first time with the Bill Martin/Phil Coulter song "Puppet on a String", sung by Sandie Shaw (barefoot).
- May – John Peel's after-midnight show on pirate station Radio London becomes The Perfumed Garden and, contrary to the station's daytime "Fab 40" playlist, he introduces his eclectic mix of folk, blues, psychedelic and progressive rock which continues until the station is forced off the air in August and Peel moves to BBC Radio 1.
- 1 May – Paul McCartney reveals that all four members of The Beatles have "dropped acid".
- 12 May
  - Pink Floyd stage the first ever rock concert with quadraphonic sound at the new Queen Elizabeth Hall, London ("Games for May").
  - The debut album of The Jimi Hendrix Experience, Are You Experienced, is released in the UK, where it was recorded.
- 15 May – Paul McCartney meets American photographer Linda Eastman, his future wife, at the "Bag O' Nails" club in London.
- 19 May – Linda Eastman photographs The Beatles at the London press party for Sgt. Pepper's Lonely Hearts Club Band held at the Belgravia home of Brian Epstein. Media there are perplexed by the band's fashion statements and the music itself. The following day, Kenny Everett plays the album almost complete on BBC Light Programme radio show Where It's At. The BBC refuse to air "A Day in the Life" for alleged "drug references" in the lyrics.
- 26 May – The Beatles' album Sgt. Pepper's Lonely Hearts Club Band is rush released in the UK as mono and stereo LPs ahead of the scheduled June 1 release date. "The closest Western Civilization has come to unity since the Congress of Vienna in 1815 was the week the Sgt. Pepper album was released."
- 29 May (Spring Bank Holiday) – 'Barbeque 67', a music festival, at the Tulip Bulb Auction Hall, Spalding, Lincolnshire, features Jimi Hendrix, Cream, Pink Floyd and Zoot Money.
- 30 May – BBC Light Programme radio broadcasts an edition of Where It's At featuring The Beatles interviews and John Lennon's comedy intro to "Lucy in the Sky with Diamonds".
- 2 June – At the start of the 20th Aldeburgh Festival, Queen Elizabeth II opens the new Snape Maltings concert hall.
- 4 June – Jimi Hendrix Experience, Cream, Denny Laine and his Electric String Band, Procol Harum and The Chiffons, perform a two-hour "Sunday Special" at the Saville Theatre in London (leased at this time by Brian Epstein).
- 15 June – English cellist Jacqueline Du Pré marries Jewish conductor Daniel Barenboim at the Western Wall in Jerusalem.
- 25 June – The Beatles perform "All You Need Is Love" for the Our World television special, the first worldwide television broadcast. Backing singers include Eric Clapton and members of The Rolling Stones and The Who.
- 28 June – The Monkees fly into London at the start of their concerts at the Empire Pool, Wembley.
- 1 July – William Rees-Mogg, editor of The Times, uses the phrase "Who breaks a butterfly upon a wheel?" in his editorial criticizing the prison sentences given to Mick Jagger and Keith Richard two days earlier. They later appeal successfully against the sentences.
- 2 July – Jeff Beck and John Mayall & the Bluesbreakers perform a two-hour "Sunday Special" at the Saville Theatre in London.
- 3 July – The Beatles host a party at the Speakeasy Club for The Monkees on the completion of their concerts in London.
- 4 August – Pink Floyd release their debut album, The Piper at the Gates of Dawn. It peaks at number 6 on the UK Albums Chart and is the only one made under the leadership of founder Syd Barrett.
- 14 August – The Marine Broadcasting Offences Act 1967 becomes law in the United Kingdom, and most offshore radio stations (including Wonderful Radio London) have already closed down. Only Radio Caroline North & South on 259 will continue, as Radio Caroline International, moving its supply operation to the Netherlands.
- 23 August – Brian Epstein's last visit to a Beatles' recording session, at the Chappell Recording Studios on Maddox Street, London. The last new Beatles song he lives to hear is "Your Mother Should Know".
- 27 August – The Beatles, in Bangor, Wales, with the Maharishi Mahesh Yogi since 25 August, are informed of the death of their manager Brian Epstein, and return to London at once.
- 31 August – Paul McCartney calls a band meeting to discuss his TV movie idea about a psychedelic bus ride.
- 7 September – Eric Burdon marries Angie King.
- 16 September – Sir Malcolm Sargent, having missed most of the Proms season through ill-health, is replaced as conductor of the Last Night of the Proms by Colin Davis, but appears on stage at the end of the concert. Monica Sinclair is the guest soloist for "Rule, Britannia". Sargent dies 17 days later.
- 30 September – The BBC completely restructures its national radio programming, introducing a pop music channel, Radio 1 (modelled on successful "pirate" station Radio London), and changes the Light Programme into the more MOR-orientated Radio 2, also renaming the Third Programme, which covers classical music and culture, to Radio 3 (and transforming the Home Service into the speech-oriented Radio 4). Radio 1's split from Radio 2 is heralded by "Theme One", specially composed by George Martin; Radio 1's programmes then launch with a jingle recorded by PAMS, the voice of DJ Tony Blackburn and his signature tune, an extract from "Beefeaters" by Johnny Dankworth. The first full single played is The Move's "Flowers in the Rain". The first song played on Radio 2 is Julie Andrews with the title song from "The Sound of Music".
- 1 October – The first Peel Session for BBC Radio 1 takes place, featuring psychedelic rock band Tomorrow.
- 11 October – Harold Wilson, Prime Minister of the United Kingdom, wins a libel action against rock band The Move in the English High Court after being depicted in a compromising position on a promotional postcard for their record "Flowers in the Rain"; in settlement, royalties from the song will be donated to charity.
- 27 October – Sir Malcolm Sargent's memorial service in Westminster Abbey is attended by 3,000 people including Princess Marina of Kent, Bridget D'Oyly Carte, Pierre Boulez, Larry Adler, Douglas Fairbanks Junior, Léon Goossens, Sir Arthur Bliss, and representatives of the London orchestras and of the Promenaders. Colin Davis and the BBC Chorus and Symphony Orchestra perform the music.
- 22 November – George Harrison begins recording tracks for Wonderwall Music, his first solo album, in London; he continues the recording in Mumbai.
- 5 December – The Beatles open the Apple Boutique in London. Party guests include Eric Clapton and movie director Richard Lester.
- 12 December – Rolling Stones guitarist Brian Jones, 25, wins a High Court appeal against a nine-month prison sentence for possessing and using cannabis. He is instead fined £1,000 and put on probation for three years.
- 15 December – The Who release their third studio album The Who Sell Out. It is a concept album, formatted as a collection of unrelated songs interspersed with faux commercials and public service announcements.
- 26 December – The first broadcast of The Beatles' made-for-TV film Magical Mystery Tour (filmed mostly during September) on BBC1. It is shown in black & white, upsetting the band because it does not show the intended psychedelic colour effects.

== Charts ==
- See UK No.1 Hits of 1967

== Classical music ==
=== New works ===
- Arwel Hughes – Mab y Dyn (cantata)
- Jeffrey Lewis – Epitaphium – Children of the Sun
- William Mathias – Sinfonietta

=== Opera ===
- Richard Rodney Bennett – A Penny for a Song
- Elizabeth Maconchy – The Three Strangers
- William Walton – The Bear

== Film and Incidental music ==
- John Barry – You Only Live Twice, starring Sean Connery.
- Richard Rodney Bennett –
  - Far from the Madding Crowd directed by John Schlesinger, starring Julie Christie, Alan Bates, Terence Stamp and Peter Finch.
  - Billion Dollar Brain directed by Ken Russell, starring Michael Caine.

== Musical theatre ==
- The Boy Friend (Sandy Wilson) – London revival opens at the Comedy Theatre on 29 November, starring Cheryl Kennedy, and runs for 365 performances
- The Four Musketeers (Music: Laurie Johnson Lyrics: Herbert Kretzmer Book: Michael Pertwee) – London production opens at the Theatre Royal, Drury Lane on 5 December, starring Harry Secombe, and runs for 462 performances
- Oliver! (Music, Lyrics & Book: Lionel Bart) – London revival opens at the Piccadilly Theatre on 26 April and runs for 331 performances

== Musical films ==
- Cuckoo Patrol, starring Freddie Garrity
- Doctor Dolittle, starring Rex Harrison, Samantha Eggar and Anthony Newley
- Half a Sixpence, starring Tommy Steele
- The Mini-Affair, starring Georgie Fame
- Privilege, starring Paul Jones

== Births ==
- 7 January – Mark Lamarr, DJ
- 15 February – Graham Jackson, conductor (died 2012)
- 11 March – John Barrowman, actor and singer
- 18 March
  - Miki Berenyi, lead singer of Lush
  - Jason John, singer (Big Fun)
- 6 April – Julian Anderson, composer and teacher
- 15 April – Frankie Poullain, bassist (The Darkness)
- 24 May – Deirdre Gribbin, composer
- 29 May – Noel Gallagher, singer-songwriter (Oasis)
- 3 June – Newton, singer-songwriter and producer
- 29 September – Brett Anderson, rock singer (Suede)
- 7 October – Luke Haines, singer-songwriter and keyboard player
- 9 October – Mat Osman, rock bassist (Suede)
- 30 October – Gavin Rossdale, guitarist, singer and actor
- 3 November – Steven Wilson, guitarist and singer (Porcupine Tree)
- 7 November – Sharleen Spiteri, singer
- 12 November – Grant Nicholas, guitarist and singer (Feeder)
- 14 November – Letitia Dean, actress and singer
- 30 November – Rob Jeffrey, singer and guitarist (Let Loose)
- 19 December – Rebecca Saunders, composer
- date unknown
  - Alistair King, composer and conductor of television music
  - Matthew King, composer, pianist and educator

== Deaths ==
- 3 January – Mary Garden, operatic soprano, 93
- 3 February – Joe Meek, record producer, 37 (suicide)
- 20 April – Denis Wright, composer and conductor of brass band music, 72
- 27 August – Brian Epstein, manager of The Beatles, 32 (suicide)
- 2 September – Philip Sainton, British–French composer, conductor and violist, 75
- 13 September – Herbert Langley, operatic baritone, 79
- 3 October – Malcolm Sargent, conductor, 72
- 13 November – Harriet Cohen, pianist, 71
- 18 November – Elise Stevenson, British-born US singer, 89

== See also ==
- 1967 in British radio
- 1967 in British television
- 1967 in the United Kingdom
- List of British films of 1967
