= Earl Richmond (broadcaster) =

British broadcaster (1928–2001)

Earl Richmond (Real name John Dienn), was a broadcaster born in Highgate, London in 1928, he died in May 2001.

Earl first worked in radio on British Forces Radio in Trieste. He was also heard in Cyprus before moving to America to study Television.

His first job in Television was as Transmission Controller for Rediffusion in the 1950s. He then moved back into radio when Radio London started in 1964 to present the 9:00 A.M - 12:00 P.M slot, he was also the administrator on board the MV Galaxy radio ship that the station broadcast from. Earl stayed with the pirate station until the spring of 1966.

Earl then became a familiar voice on Yorkshire Television in the late 1960s and 1970s as a continuity announcer.

Incidentally, Yorkshire Television also hired Richmond's fellow Radio London DJs John Crosse and Paul Kaye as announcers, as well as Keith Martin from Radio Caroline and Terry Davis from Radio North Sea.

After leaving Yorkshire Television, he moved to Thailand to set up a production company and work on English-language radio in Bangkok. He was also involved in the Hotel trade and ran a restaurant called 'The Beefeater' before dying after a heart attack .
