= Ian Damon =

British radio personality

Ian Damon (born Ian Davidson 5 June 1935) is a British radio personality.

Born in Sydney, Australia and after 8 years as a broadcaster on New South Wales stations 2RG and 2LF, Damon decided to tour Europe and Canada settling in Bishop's Stortford, Hertfordshire in the UK during which time, he presented a regular show on Radio Stortford (Bishop's Stortford Hospital Radio), a volunteer-run organisation broadcasting via GPO landline to the Herts and Essex Hospital, Rye Street Hospital and Elmhurst Care Home, all in Bishop's Stortford and for a while, the Princess Alexandra Hospital in Harlow, Essex.

He joined the offshore Radio London/Big L on the MV Galaxy replacing Tony Blackburn in 1967; and was given the name of 'Wombat' by Tony Brandon. On its demise, Damon freelanced and was engaged as a continuity announcer by ATV London and ABC Manchester. He also contributed to BBC Radio 2's 'Roundabout' programme. He returned to Australia for 5 years awaiting the start of independent radio, during which time Damon announced for both radio and television stations including being a member of the "Snob Mob" at 2CH in Sydney.

Damon came back to the UK, worked for Southern Television and was part of the original team at Capital Radio for over 5 years using his real name of Ian Davidson. He was the face of the "Fun Bus" – broadcasting live and promoting the station all around London and the Home Counties. On his London Link programme, Damon broadcast to radio stations around the Commonwealth from Australia to Canada, Hong Kong to Barbados.

In the 80s and 90s, after a stint at Blue Danube Radio in Austria, Damon worked for provincial stations in England including Pennine Radio, LBC, Essex Radio, Radio Mercury, Radio 210, KFM Tonbridge and Delta FM/ Wey Valley Radio. Before moving to Norfolk in 2002, Damon was at County Sound radio in Guildford.

From May 2005 to September 2008 Damon presented Sunday programmes on Big L 1395.

Originally Damon presented the Solid Gold Sunday 1400 – 1800 when the station was called Radio London International (named after the original offshore station). A change of management meant Ian's show was moved to a later slot and the programme changed format. However, in the summer of 2008 Damon's programme returned to its original slot and format but this was only to be for a short time as when the station faced financial difficulties Damon left due to the agreed promised payment not being forthcoming for his services.

Damon also was part of Pirate BBC Essex broadcasting from the LV18 lightship in Harwich in 2004 and again in 2007 to celebrate the 40th anniversary of the closure of the offshore stations.

In August 2009 Damon joined community station Wayland Radio to host a weekly Sunday afternoon show for the station before the station closed due to lack of finance.

In July 2014 Damon joined the annual short term station Red Sands Radio to host a weekly Sunday afternoon soul show for the station's Solid Gold Sunday outlet

Most recently, Ian joined community radio station Maidstone Radio in 2019. He currently presents a one hour weekly show of oldies from the 50s to 60s on Sunday afternoons.
