= Swinging Radio England =

UK offshore "pirate" radio station

Swinging Radio England ("SRE") was a top 40 offshore commercial station billed as the "World's Most Powerful" that operated from 3 May 1966 to 13 November 1966 from a ship in the North Sea, four and a half miles off Frinton-on-Sea, Essex, England. While the station was dubbed a pirate radio station, its operation took place within the law and its offices were in the West End of London. Its representation was by a company formed earlier in the year to represent in Europe the ABC radio and television stations of the United States.

Both the studio and the 50 kilowatt AM transmitter of Swinging Radio England were in two prefabricated rooms lowered into holds of the MV Olga Patricia (later renamed MV Laissez Faire), a World War II vessel built in the US as a supply ship. The station shared the studio and transmitter holds with a 50 kW AM sister station named Britain Radio billed as the Hallmark of Quality and broadcasting easy listening music.

== Origin of the station ==
Swinging Radio England was the brainchild of Don Pierson who lived in Eastland, Texas, US. According to an interview by Dr. Eric Gilder with Don Pierson published by Sibiu University Press in Romania during 2001, Don Pierson got the idea following the success of his earlier venture called Wonderful Radio London.

Like Wonderful Radio London, its jingles were made by PAMS in Dallas, as part of "The Jet Set" series 27 originally made for WABC, New York. Its rapid fire bannerline news at 15 minutes past the hour was borrowed from WFUN in Miami. The on-air staff were known as boss jocks, although the offshore version only slightly resembled the style of KHJ in California which originated the name. (See footnote section below regarding Tommy Vance on KHJ in November 1965 and Radio Caroline South in January 1966.)

== Station transmitters and antenna ==
Don Pierson delegated transmitter and antenna work to the Continental Electronics (CEMCO) company in Dallas, Texas, as a turn-key operation. Pierson had obtained advice from consulting radio engineer Bill Carr of Fort Worth, Texas, who had worked on the antenna construction of Wonderful Radio London. When Pierson began to run out of time getting the twin stations on the air due to difficulty in getting financial underwriters, he revised his plans. The project was divided into three: the ship; the stations and advertising. As a result, it was not until the beginning of 1966 that a final contract was completed with CEMCO. CEMCO relied on experience of similar work for agencies of the United States government. While Carr understood the necessity of working within the time and money available to commercial ventures, CEMCO were used to working on massive projects underwritten by governments where time delays and cost overruns were normal.

== Studios ==
The studios for Swinging Radio England and Britain Radio were in adjoining rooms, and like the transmitters which were housed in a prefabricated building lowered into one of the holds of the ship, the two rooms were located in a similar building lowered into the second hold of the ship. When Don Pierson planned the station in 1965, his engineer Bill Carr suggested 665 kHz and 795 kHz or 815 kHz. By the end of November that year, Don Pierson had still been unable to finance either the purchase of a ship or the two offshore stations. By the time financial arrangements were completed, New Year 1966 had arrived and he decided to speed up the operation. This was divided into a ship purchase and a package purchase for both stations and the antenna to be designed, manufactured and installed by Continental Electronics.

Both studios were going to be automated using ideas that Pierson had planned for Wonderful Radio London. At that time, some stations in the US were using this method to program both easy listening and top forty formats because they required fewer staff, which in turn kept expense to a minimum. At the last moment Pierson was persuaded by one of the disc jockeys hired from nearby WFUN in South Miami to make a further purchase for the top forty station to install a Collins Radio control board and to staff the station with live announcers who would live on the ship. As a result, most of the automation for both stations was moved to the Britain Radio studio to create more space for the new board and equipment.

== Technical problems ==
Among other suggestions by Bill Carr had been the erection of a 200-foot mast to which the transmitter signals would be shunt-fed to the top using a similar but higher placed method to the Wonderful Radio London ship station. On board ship at dock in Miami, CEMCO installed a second mast attached to the original to support a third outstretched triangular boom. At the end of that boom was a heavy insulator that hung down to provide attachment for a large swinging cable that stretched down to the transmitters below deck. This cable shunt-fed signals to the top of the mast from which radiating antennas were then attached.

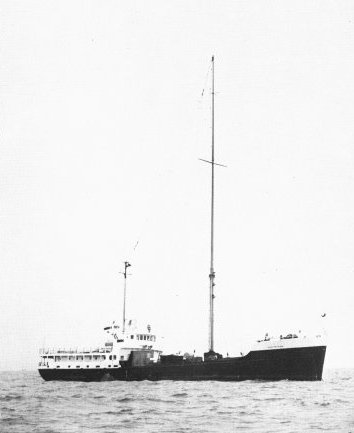
MV Olga Patricia

When engineering on the mast was completed, Pierson doubted it could withstand the Atlantic crossing and North Sea weather. He was advised by Tom Danaher, who had designed the mast for Wonderful Radio London which Bill Carr had used for his antenna work, that the triangular boom of the CEMCO structure would fail due to heavy stress on it by the swinging shunt-fed cable. Just as predicted it came crashing to the deck two hours after the ship left port.

Carpenters had been hired at the last minute to construct sleeping arrangements for additional staff made necessary by the change from automation to live presentation. The Collins Radio board had been delivered at the last minute and was being wired at sea by Rick Crandall, one of the first hired by Pierson to program the stations. When the ship arrived in Europe it was incapable of transmitting programs due to delays caused by the unavailability of CEMCO staff.

Against advice from attorneys representing the CEMCO turn-key contract, Pierson chanced voiding the CEMCO contract by hiring a British engineer to get the stations on air with an improvised replacement antenna. When the engineer succeeded in getting SRE as the first station on the air, another problem emerged. Carr had suggested three frequencies for the antenna that he believed he would build, but Carr had cautioned that research needed to be carried out on their suitability in Europe. The attorney for the ship venture accused CEMCO of failing to conduct this research when it was discovered that when Swinging Radio England finally got on the air, its 845 kHz signal began clashing with an Italian state-owned radio station in Rome while both 795 kHz and 815 kHz were off-channel and too close to the 809 kHz frequency used by a BBC network in Scotland. When engineers enabled Britain Radio to begin broadcasting at the same time as SRE, it was because they had lowered the power of its transmitter and used a new but inferior frequency (1322 kHz/227 m). In order to resolve complaints from the Italian government about the SRE signal, SRE switched frequencies with Britain Radio. While Britain Radio was able to serve a large area, the reception of SRE was anything but that of the "world's most powerful" and as a result SRE attracted little commercial support. Britain Radio received sustaining income from broadcasting "The World Tomorrow" program presented by Herbert W. Armstrong and Garner Ted Armstrong.

== Ownership and management ==
Although the project was created by Don Pierson, financial management came to rest in Pierce Langford III of Wichita Falls, Texas, who also managed the political career of U.S. Senator John Tower who had taken interest in Swinging Radio England. Whether Tower, who climbed to the centre of U.S. Senate oversight of intelligence affairs. Ownership resided with investors in North and West Texas. These investors formed loyalties to various factions and this caused infighting when the venture turned into chaotic failure.

Advertising sales were assigned to William E. Vick of Amarillo, Texas under an exclusive contract. Vick, whose family were also investors in the venture, moved his family to London where he formed a British company called Peir Vick, Ltd. Vick leased offices above which he lived, at 32 Curzon Street in the Mayfair district of London. They were across the street from Radlon (Sales) at 17 Curzon Street which had a similar contract to represent Wonderful Radio London.

Vick entered two exclusive contracts with two British companies. The first went to Peter Rendall and Associates who handled public relations and parties to launch the stations. In turn Rendall introduced Radiovision Broadcasts International, (RBI), formed in January 1966 as a subsidiary of Pearl & Dean whose reputation had been established by selling space on British cinema screens. The creation of RBI had been triggered by the intention of the ABC radio and television networks in the United States to expand the sale of their program and broadcasting interests in Britain and Europe. The ABC connection with British media had begun many years earlier when it entered into a relationship with Rupert Murdoch.

These moves coincided with continuing and intensive rumors that as a result of lobbying by prospective commercial radio interests culminating in the arrival of Radio Caroline and then Wonderful Radio London, the British Government was about to license two 50 kW commercial radio stations to be located in two different British cities. As late as December 1965 Pierson had been advised not to go ahead with his offshore stations but to seek these two licenses instead. A compromise was seen in the prefabrication of the CEMCO transmitters and studios which could be unloaded on land should such licenses be granted.

The engineering work never succeeded in making the offshore stations operational and RBI failed to sell enough advertising to make the venture profitable, while the public relations firm spent large sums promoting the stations. William Vick submitted an application to the GPO radio licensing authority for licenses to bring his offshore twin stations on land.

By late September 1966, Pierson was no longer involved in day-to-day operations and CEO William Vick had named Britain Radio's program chief, Jack Curtiss of San Francisco, general manager of both stations. Curtiss' first assignment was to close Radio England and create a Dutch-language station to operate alongside Britain Radio. The move was to avoid the British Government's impending "Marine Broadcast Offences" law that would outlaw pirate operations in the United Kingdom. Vick and Curtiss headed to Amsterdam to locate offices and hire Dutch-speaking deejays to staff the station which was called Radio Dolfijn (Radio Dolphin) after the initial notion of a "Swinging Radio Holland" had been advertised but dropped when the official station Radio Holland complained. The new station went on the air in mid-November 1966 and Radio England passed into history after a turbulent six months.

== Britain Radio and Radio 355 ==
Middle-of-the-road station Britain Radio, which had begun at the same time as Radio England, continued broadcasting until 22 February 1967. At about this time the antenna was damaged in a storm and the ship put into Amsterdam for repairs. Ted Allbeury, formerly of Radio 390, took over as managing director, renaming the station Radio 355, and his new company Carstead Advertising took over from Pier-Vick. Several Radio 390 presenters moved across with him. DJ Tony Windsor became programme director, having shortly left a similar position at Wonderful Radio London.

In July the station and its Dutch counterpart Radio 227 simulcast a live concert by guitarist José Feliciano; also that month, the ship radioed an SOS, claiming that a Dutch crewman had gone berserk and attacked the captain. The following day two Dutchmen were taken off the ship by its tender.

On 2 August it was announced that the station would close at midnight on 5 August. The final programme began at 10 PM and featured all of the DJs reminiscing, playing their favourite records and making their farewells. The last was Tony Windsor, who then introduced a short recorded speech by Allbeury in which he contrasted the freedom of the airwaves in the United States with state control in Europe. The final broadcast ended with the DJs singing along to Auld Lang Syne followed by the National Anthem. The programme having overrun, the transmitter finally went off the air at about 12:21 AM on 6 August.

One surviving recording of the closedown broadcast also includes a tribute to Radio 355 made a few minutes later on Wonderful Radio London by newsreader Paul Kaye, briefly interrupting John Peel's Perfumed Garden programme.

== Noteworthy events ==
Two major parties were thrown by Peter Rendall and Associates to introduce RBI to advertisers, second of being held at the London Hilton hotel and promoted in the press as "The Party of the Year". This was followed by a nationwide live music tour called "Swinging 66" for which the headline act was the Small Faces.

Swinging Radio England made its arrival with the Mitch Miller recording of "Yellow Rose of Texas". This was followed by the PAMS jingles, which resulted in their being copied, edited and rebroadcast by rival Radio Caroline South on their ship anchored close by the Olga Patricia. The same jingles, taken either from tapes of the test transmissions or from bootlegged PAMS demo tapes, ended up being used in edited form by almost all the other offshore pirates of the time. This included Radio London, despite the fact that it already used a PAMS set. Meanwhile, Radio England countered this by acquiring a new set of jingles from a smaller company, Spot Productions, and requiring that all their DJs talk over them to prevent them from being copied and reused.

The decision by Don Pierson to allow Ron O'Quinn as programme director to change the automated system to a live format was the most controversial. O'Quinn, who had been a disc jockey at WFUN, borrowed every kind of format he was familiar with in Georgia and Florida, to create a hybrid sound only ever heard in Europe. A key was naming the djs as "Boss jocks", a term borrowed from KHJ on the West Coast of the US who were using it to give a brand form of delivery that replaced their former laid back air delivery. Even without appropriating the "Boss radio" brand SRE was anything but laid back. Everything had echo, was shouted, and had either a genuine southern US accent or English voices using transatlantic accents. Even its news style, which had been used WFUN and KBOX in Dallas, was full of buzzers, beeps, echo and full-throttle delivery. An example was the station identification announcement (which was also accompanied by a drum roll): "This is "SRE-Swinging Radio England. Broadcasting 4 1/2 miles off the Frinton Essex coast on 2-2-7 metres, 24 hours a day, in excess of 50,000 watts of power. SRE, first and foremost is BOSS!" While British and Continental European teenagers were excited the station failed to pull in enough to interest advertisers and this coupled with technical problems gave SRE a short life. By November 1966 it was over.

Among 'Boss jocks' on SRE were Rick Randall, Boom-Boom Branigan, Johnnie Walker (the only SRE stalwart to make it as far as the BBC's 'pirate buster', Radio 1), and Larry Dean. Dean became a master of O'Quinn's hybrid sound. Rick Randall has mused that perhaps Pierson had been right and that more polish, control and saving of expenses would have been achieved had Swinging Radio England been automated.

== Footnotes ==
Ron O'Quinn was program director of SRE and he borrowed its style of presentation from stations he was familiar with. (A brief video interview with O'Quinn dating to 1966 is available on YouTube.) The term "boss jock" had begun with KHJ in Los Angeles. By 1965, Richard Hope-Weston who was born in Oxford, England in 1940, had arrived at KHJ in Los Angeles from KOL in Seattle where he had been broadcasting under the name of Rick West. A condition of employment at KHJ was that he changed his name to Tommy Vance, since the station had a jingle cut for that name. Vance arrived at the height of the British Invasion of the US music charts and his pronounced British accent told listeners that KHJ had both the music and the authentic accent. By November 1965 Vance was identifying KHJ as being in "Boss Angeles" on "boss radio" with "much more music", the last expressions used repeatedly by SRE the following year. When Vance received notice that he was likely to be drafted into the U.S. army he returned to the U.K. and by January 1966 was broadcasting on Radio Caroline South with a pronounced transatlantic accent to demonstrate to British listeners his American roots. At that time SRE was months from coming on the air. (See External links below for examples of Vance on KHJ as a British boss jock, and on Radio Caroline South as a transatlantic disc jockey.)

SRE was followed by two Dutch language stations occupying the same wavelength between 1966 and July 1967, Radio Dolfijn and Radio 227, the latter changed format towards the end.

An example of a functioning automated top 40 station using the same PAMS jingles series 27 as SRE, but minus the "boss jocks" and shock news delivery, was WGNE and in 1971 it was still using this format from the Signal Hill Country Club in the city of Panama City Beach, Florida. WGNE was run by three adults and a teenager, one adult managing the station and two adults recording programs and selling commercials. The automation was similar to that aboard the Olga Patricia for Britain Radio.

Swinging Radio England was billed on its letterhead as "World's Most Powerful", a slogan used extensively by LTV-Continental Electronics in its brochures to describe many of its high-power company transmission applications for the Voice of America and U.S. Navy. Continental Electronics intended to provide Pierson with two 50,000-watt transmitters using a common mast to support two antennas and a combining system that could create one offshore station with 100,000 watts. Although Radio Caroline (which returned to the air under new management following the demise of the original Caroline Network company of the 1960s), offered two AM stations and one shortwave station in the 1980s from one ship, the power of these stations did not match the potential of the stations aboard the Olga Patricia of 1966. Radio Northsea International was theoretically capable of broadcasting with 105,000 watts of power on MW (with additional SW and FM frequencies).

== The maritime history of the MV Olga Patricia ==
The ship's history sees her with the name of Olga Patricia and then Laissez Faire configured as a "pirate" radio ship off Frinton, Essex in the United Kingdom housing 5 different radio stations from May 3, 1966, until August 5, 1967, then US court cases. Following a 1970s Miami court verdict, Laissez Faire was awarded to Pierce Langford III. A confusing history then begins because its former name and history have been switched in Lloyds Registry to that of Olga Princess. There were allegations of clandestine use from 1971 in the Caribbean with the name of Akuarius II. At any rate, by 1973 the ship had been sold and converted to a menhaden vessel and was named the Earl J. Conrad Junior operating for what is now the Omega Protein company. Earlier owned by the Zapata companies which in the 1990s announced plans to turn a new Internet service called "ZAP!" into a bigger company than Yahoo!. Zapata had ties to George H. W. Bush (former Central Intelligence Agency chief and U.S. president). The ship for many years operated with some sister ships in the Chesapeake Bay area menhaden fishery. It was scrapped in Mississippi 2011.

== See also ==
- Wonderful Radio London – Don Pierson's first offshore radio station.
- Freeport Tortuga – Don Pierson's first attempt to create a freeport.
- Boss Radio – how the term came into use at KHJ in Los Angeles.
- Radio transmitter – the relationship between transmitters and antennas.
- Voice of America – Scan down page to History section for information about the VOA radio ship Courier.
- VLF – Scan down page to entry for Cutler, Maine. This was a CEMCO construction project of the world's most powerful transmitter (currently listed as 2 megawatts) used for submarine communication.
