= 1967 in the United Kingdom =

Events from the year 1967 in the United Kingdom.

== Incumbents ==
- Monarch – Elizabeth II
- Prime Minister – Harold Wilson (Labour)

== Events ==
=== January ===
- 1 January – England's 1966 World Cup winning manager Alf Ramsey receives a knighthood and Captain Bobby Moore receives an OBE in the New Year Honours.
- 2 January – Veteran actor Charlie Chaplin opens his last film, A Countess From Hong Kong, in the UK.
- 3 January – The stop motion children's television series Trumpton, first of the Trumptonshire trilogy, is first shown, on BBC1.
- 4 January – Racing driver and motorboat racer Donald Campbell's final attempt to break his own speed record ends in his death in a crash on Coniston Water in the Lake District.
- 7 January–1 July – The 26-part television series The Forsyte Saga is first shown, on BBC2.
- 15 January – The United Kingdom enters the first round of negotiations for European Economic Community membership in Rome; on 16 January Italy announces support for the UK's application.
- 18 January – Jeremy Thorpe becomes Leader of the Liberal Party.
- 23 January – Milton Keynes, a village situated in northern Buckinghamshire, is formally designated as a new town by the government, incorporating nearby towns and villages including Bletchley and Newport Pagnell. Intended to accommodate the overspill population from London – some fifty miles away – it will become the United Kingdom's largest new town, with the area's population multiplying during the 1970s and 1980s.
- 26 January – Parliament decides to nationalise 90% of the British steel industry.
- 27 January – The UK, Soviet Union and United States sign the Outer Space Treaty.
- 29 January – Northern Ireland Civil Rights Association is founded in Belfast.
- January – The London-set film Blowup is released in the UK.

=== February ===
- 6 February – Soviet Premier Alexei Kosygin arrives in the UK for an eight-day visit, meeting the Queen on 9 February.
- 7 February – The British National Front is founded by A. K. Chesterton (by an amalgamation of the British National Party and League of Empire Loyalists).
- 12 February – Police raid "Redlands", the Sussex home of Rolling Stones musician Keith Richards, following a tip-off from the News of the World. No immediate arrests are made, but Richards, fellow band member Mick Jagger and art dealer Robert Fraser are later charged with possession of drugs.
- 25 February – The United Kingdom's second Polaris nuclear submarine, HMS Renown, is launched at Birkenhead.
- 26 February – Non-league footballer Tony Allden dies after being struck by lightning on the pitch when playing for Birmingham-based side Highgate United in an FA Amateur Cup tie. Three others players are also struck but survive.
- 27 February – The Dutch government announces support for British EEC membership.

=== March ===
- 1 March – The Queen Elizabeth Hall is opened in London as a concert venue.
- 4 March
  - The first North Sea gas is pumped ashore at Easington, East Riding of Yorkshire.
  - Queens Park Rangers become the first Football League Third Division side to win the League Cup at Wembley Stadium defeating West Bromwich Albion 3–2. It is also the first year of a one-match final in the competition, the previous six finals having been two-legged affairs.
- 5 March – Journalist Polly Toynbee reveals the existence of the "Harry" letters that allege the secret funding of Amnesty International by the British government.
- 13 March – A student sit-in at the London School of Economics begins in protest at the suspension of a student.
- 15 March – Manny Shinwell, 82, resigns as Chairman of the Parliamentary Labour Party.
- 18 March – Torrey Canyon oil spill: The supertanker SS Torrey Canyon runs aground between Land's End and the Scilly Isles.
- 29–30 March – RAF and Fleet Air Arm planes bomb the grounded Torrey Canyon and sink it.
- 29 March – Alan Ayckbourn's first major success, Relatively Speaking, has its West End opening at the Duke of York's Theatre with Richard Briers, Michael Hordern and Celia Johnson.
- 31 March – At the Astoria Theatre, Finsbury Park, London, Jimi Hendrix sets fire to his guitar on stage for the first time. He is taken to hospital suffering burns to his hands.

=== April ===
- 2 April – A United Nations delegation arrives in the State of Aden because of its approaching independence. They leave five days later, accusing British authorities of a lack of cooperation. The British say the delegation did not contact them.
- 3 April – Anguillan-born Norwell Roberts becomes the first black officer in London's Metropolitan Police.
- 8 April
  - 1967 Grand National is won by 100-1 outsider Foinavon.
  - "Puppet on a String", performed barefoot by Sandie Shaw (music and lyrics by Bill Martin and Phil Coulter), wins the Eurovision Song Contest 1967 for the UK in Vienna, becoming the first English-language song to win the contest.
- 11 April – Tom Stoppard's tragicomedy Rosencrantz and Guildenstern Are Dead receives its Old Vic premiere in London.
- 13 April
  - Conservatives win the Greater London Council elections.
  - Casino Royale, the first of two unofficial James Bond films not produced by Eon Productions, is released. A parody, it is the only film to star David Niven as James Bond.

=== May ===
- 2 May – Harold Wilson announces that the United Kingdom has decided to apply for EEC membership
- 5 May
  - The British-designed satellite Ariel 3, the first to be developed outside the Soviet Union or United States, is launched from the US.
  - The first motorway project of the year is completed when the elevated motorway section of the A57 road is officially opened (by Prime Minister Harold Wilson) to form a bypass around the south of Manchester city area. The M1 is also being expanded this month from both termini, meaning that there will now be an unbroken motorway link between North London and South Yorkshire.
- 6 May – Manchester United win the Football League First Division title.
- 9 May – Peter Nichols' play A Day in the Death of Joe Egg premieres at the Citizens Theatre, Glasgow.
- 11 May – The United Kingdom and the Republic of Ireland officially apply for European Economic Community membership.
- 12 May – The Poet Laureate John Masefield dies aged 88 at his home in Abingdon, Berkshire.
- 14 May – The Roman Catholic Liverpool Metropolitan Cathedral of Christ the King is consecrated.
- 20 May – In the first all-London FA Cup final, Tottenham Hotspur defeat Chelsea 2–1 at Wembley Stadium.
- 24 May – The Royal Navy Leander-class frigate HMS Andromeda is launched at Portsmouth Dockyard, the last ship to be built there.
- 25 May
  - Celtic F.C. become the first British and Northern European team to reach a European Cup final and also to win it, beating Inter Milan 2–1 in normal time with the winning goal being scored by Steve Chalmers in Lisbon, Portugal.
  - Shadow Cabinet Conservative MP Enoch Powell describes the United Kingdom as the "sick man of Europe" in his latest verbal attack on the Labour government.
- 26 May – The Beatles' album Sgt. Pepper's Lonely Hearts Club Band is rush released in the UK as mono and stereo LPs ahead of the scheduled June 1 release date. "The closest Western Civilization has come to unity since the Congress of Vienna in 1815 was the week the Sgt. Pepper album was released."
- 28 May – Sir Francis Chichester arrives in Plymouth after completing his single-handed sailing voyage around the world in his yacht, Gipsy Moth IV, in nine months and one day.
- 29 May
  - The first Spring Bank Holiday occurs on a fixed date of the last Monday in May, replacing the former Whitsun holiday in England and Wales.
  - 'Barbeque 67', a music festival, at the Tulip Bulb Auction Hall, Spalding, features Jimi Hendrix, Cream, Pink Floyd and Zoot Money.

=== June ===
- 4 June – Stockport Air Disaster: British Midland flight G-ALHG crashes in Hopes Carr, Stockport, killing 72 passengers and crew.
- 5 June – The General Post Office introduces the Machin series of definitive stamps. The Arnold Machin design will be one of the most reproduced works of art in history with approximately 320 billion copies produced.
- 12 June – You Only Live Twice, the fifth main James Bond film, premieres in London.
- 27 June – The first automatic cash machine (voucher-based) is installed in the office of Barclays Bank in Enfield.
- 28 June
  - Murder of Louisa Dunne: a 75-year-old woman is found murdered at her home in Bristol; no-one is charged with the crime until 2024.
  - National Health Service (Family Planning) Act enables local health authorities to provide family planning advice more widely, including to the unmarried.
- 29 June – Keith Richards of The Rolling Stones is jailed for a year for possession of illegal drugs. His bandmate Mick Jagger is sentenced to three months for the same offence. On appeal, Richards' conviction is overturned and Jagger is given a conditional discharge.

=== July ===
- 1 July – The first scheduled colour television broadcasts from six transmitters covering the main population centres in England begin on BBC2 for certain programmes, the first being live coverage from the Wimbledon Championships. A full colour service (other than news programmes) begins on BBC2 on 2 December.
- 3 July – News at Ten premieres on ITV, airing for half an hour.
- 4 July – Parliament decriminalises private acts of consensual adult male homosexuality in England and Wales with the Sexual Offences Act.
- 7 July – In the last amateur Wimbledon tennis tournament, Australian John Newcombe beats German Wilhelm P. Bungert to win the Gentlemen's Singles championship. The next day, American Billie Jean King beats Briton Ann Haydon Jones to win the Ladies' Singles championship.
- 13 July – English road racing cyclist Tom Simpson dies of exhaustion on the slopes of Mont Ventoux during the 13th stage of the Tour de France.
- 16 July – A rally for legalisation of cannabis in the United Kingdom attracts over 5,000 peaceful demonstrators to Hyde Park, London.
- 18 July – The UK government announces the closing of British military bases in Malaysia and Singapore.
- 21 July – Criminal Law Act 1967 is passed, making major changes with effect from 1968. It formally repeals the Profane Oaths Act 1745 and decriminalises certain obsolete offences such as eavesdropping, being a common scold and praemunire.
- 27 July – The Welsh Language Act allows the use of Welsh in legal proceedings and official documents in Wales.
- 28 July – The British steel industry is nationalised.
- July – Astronomers Jocelyn Bell Burnell and Antony Hewish become the first to observe a pulsar.

=== August ===
- 3 August – The inquiry into the Aberfan disaster blames the National Coal Board for the collapse of a colliery spoil tip which claimed the lives of 116 children and 28 adults in South Wales in October last year.
- 5 August – Pink Floyd release their debut album The Piper at the Gates of Dawn.
- 8 August – Dunsop Valley enters the UK Weather Records with the Highest 90-min total rainfall at 117mm. As of August 2010, this record remains.
- 9 August – Playwright Joe Orton is battered to death by his lover Kenneth Halliwell (who then commits suicide) at their North London home.
- 14 August – The Marine Broadcasting Offences Act 1967 declares participation in offshore pirate radio in the United Kingdom illegal. Wonderful Radio London shuts down at 3:00 PM in anticipation of the Act. Many fans greet the staff upon their return to London that evening with placards reading "Freedom died with Radio London".
- 17 August – Jimmy Hill, manager of the Coventry City team who have been promoted to the Football League First Division for the first time in their history, announces that he is leaving management to concentrate on a television career.
- 27 August – The Beatles manager Brian Epstein dies of an accidental overdose in London.
- 28 August
  - The first Late Summer Holiday occurs on a fixed date of the last Monday in August, replacing the former August Bank Holiday on the first Monday in England and Wales.
  - Herbert Bowden is appointed chairman of the Independent Television Authority.

=== September ===
- 2 September – Paddy Roy Bates proclaims HM Fort Roughs, a former World War II Maunsell naval fort off the Suffolk coast, as an independent sovereign state, the Principality of Sealand.
- 6 September – Myrina is launched from the slipway at Harland and Wolff in Belfast, the first supertanker and (at around 192000 DWT) largest ship built in the UK up to this date.
- 9 September – Former UK Prime Minister Clement Attlee, 84, is hospitalised with an illness reported as a "minor condition".
- 10 September – In a Gibraltar sovereignty referendum, only 44 out of 12,182 voters in the British Crown colony of Gibraltar support rejoining Spain.
- 20 September – The RMS Queen Elizabeth 2 (the QE2) is launched at Clydebank by Queen Elizabeth II, using the same pair of gold scissors used by her mother and grandmother to launch the Queen Elizabeth and Queen Mary respectively.
- 21 September – The Conservatives gain Cambridge and Walthamstow West from Labour in by-elections.
- 27 September – The RMS Queen Mary arrives in Southampton at the end of her last transatlantic crossing.
- 29 September – Cult television series The Prisoner is first broadcast in the UK on ITV.
- 30 September – BBC Radio completely restructures its national programming: the Light Programme is split between new national pop station Radio 1 (modelled on the successful pirate station Radio London) and Radio 2; the cultural Third Programme is rebranded as Radio 3; and the primarily-talk Home Service becomes Radio 4.

=== October ===
- 5 October – A court in Brighton is the first in England and Wales to decide a case by majority verdict (10 to 2) of the jury.
- 10 October – Simon Gray's first stage play, Wise Child, opens at the Wyndham's Theatre, London, with Alec Guinness, Gordon Jackson, Simon Ward and Cleo Sylvestre.
- 11 October – Prime Minister Harold Wilson wins a libel action against rock band The Move in the High Court after being depicted in a compromising position on a promotional postcard for their record "Flowers in the Rain"; in settlement, royalties from the song would be donated to charity.
- 25 October – The Abortion Act is passed in Parliament, legalising abortion on a number of grounds (with effect from 1968).
- 30 October – British troops and Chinese demonstrators clash on the border of China and Hong Kong during the Hong Kong Riots.

=== November ===
- November – Plowden Report (Children and their Primary Schools: A Report of the Central Advisory Council for Education (England)) is published, influentially advocating a focus on student-centred learning.
- 2 November – Winnie Ewing wins the Hamilton by-election in a surprise success for the Scottish National Party in an election for the Parliament of the United Kingdom.
- 4 November – Iberia Airlines Flight 062 from Málaga Airport, Spain, to London Heathrow Airport descends far below the flight level assigned to it and crashes into the southern slope of Blackdown Hill in West Sussex, killing all 37 on board.
- 5 November – A Sunday evening express train from Hastings to London is derailed in the Hither Green rail crash, killing 49 people.
- 7 November
  - St Pancras railway station in London is made a Grade I listed building, regarded as a landmark in the appreciation of Victorian architecture.
  - Boxer Henry Cooper becomes the first to win three Lonsdale Belts outright.
- 8 November – The first BBC Local Radio station broadcast is made by BBC Radio Leicester.
- 18 November – Movement of animals is banned in England and Wales because of a foot-and-mouth disease outbreak.
- 19 November – The pound is devalued from 1 GBP = 2.80 USD to 1 GBP = US$2.40 because of the UK's economic difficulties. Prime Minister Harold Wilson defends this decision in a broadcast to the nation, assuring his audience that "Our decision to devalue attacks our problem at the root... It does not mean, of course, that the pound here in Britain, in your pocket or purse or in your bank, has been devalued."
- 27 November – President Charles de Gaulle of France again vetoes British entry into the European Economic Community.
- 28 November – Horse racing events are called off due to the foot-and-mouth disease outbreak.
- 30 November – British troops leave the State of Aden, which they have occupied since 1839, enabling formation of the new republic of Yemen.

=== December ===
- 1 December – Tony O'Connor becomes the first non-White head teacher of a British school when appointed as head of a Primary school in Smethwick, near Birmingham.
- 5 December – The Beatles open the Apple Shop in London.
- 10 December – Ronald George Wreyford Norrish, George Porter and the German Manfred Eigen win the Nobel Prize in Chemistry "for their studies of extremely fast chemical reactions, effected by disturbing the equilibrium by means of very short pulses of energy".
- 11 December – The Concorde supersonic aircraft is unveiled in Toulouse, France.
- 12 December – Rolling Stones guitarist Brian Jones, 25, wins a High Court appeal against a nine-month prison sentence for possessing and using cannabis. He is instead fined £1,000 and put on probation for three years.
- 22 December – The BBC Radio 4 panel game Just a Minute, chaired by Nicholas Parsons, is first transmitted; Parsons continues to chair the show until shortly before his death in 2020.

=== Undated ===
- First stage of Cumbernauld town centre, the main shopping centre for the designated new town of Cumbernauld, Scotland, is completed, widely accepted as the UK's first shopping mall and the world's first multi-level covered town centre.
- Parker Morris Standards became mandatory for all housing built in New Towns.
- The first Conservation area (United Kingdom) is designated, in Stamford, Lincolnshire.
- St Christopher's Hospice, the world's first purpose-built secular hospice specialising in palliative care of the terminally ill, is established in South London by Cicely Saunders with the support of Albertine Winner.
- The Passport Office moves to Newport and HM Land Registry to Swansea, both in South Wales, as part of an effort to move government offices into the regions.
- Reliance Controls factory in Swindon, the last design by Team 4 (Richard Rogers, Norman Foster and their respective wives), considered the first example of High-tech architecture in the UK, is opened (demolished 1991).
- The Eel Pie Island Hotel on the Thames is forced to close because the owner cannot meet the cost of repairs demanded by the police.
- Car manufacturer Chrysler takes full control of the Rootes Group.
- Ford announce the end of Anglia production and replace it with an all-new car called the Escort, which like its predecessor will be built at Dagenham and sold all over Europe.
- Major changes are introduced to Scouting in the UK: the name of its organisation is changed from The Boy Scout Association to The Scout Association; the youngest section is renamed Cub Scouts; the Boy Scouts became the Scouts (with a new uniform including long trousers replacing shorts); and Senior Scouts (age 16–20) become Venture Scouts.
- Erith Group, a major British construction and civil engineering company, is created by Tom Darsey.

== Publications ==
- 16 January – Boy's Own Paper, founded in 1879, publishes its final issue.
- J. A. Baker's study The Peregrine.
- Agatha Christie's crime novel Endless Night (30 October).
- Michael Holroyd's Lytton Strachey: A Critical Biography, volume 1: The unknown years (1880–1910).
- Liverpool poets Roger McGough, Brian Patten and Adrian Henri's poetry anthology The Mersey Sound.
- Alistair MacLean's wartime thriller and screenplay Where Eagles Dare.
- Desmond Morris' popular anthropology The Naked Ape (12 October).
- Barry Unsworth's novel The Greeks Have a Word For It.

== Births ==
=== January – April ===
- 4 January – Johnny Nelson, English boxer and sportscaster
- 6 January – Lee Anderson, politician
- 7 January
  - Nick Clegg, politician and businessman
  - Mark Lamarr, British comedian and broadcast presenter
- 8 January – Tom Watson, politician
- 11 January – John Nuttall, Olympic long-distance runner (died 2023)
- 13 January – Tom Bradby, journalist and novelist
- 14 January – Emily Watson, English actress
- 18 January – Anjem Choudary, British Islamic activist
- 21 January – Kathryn Johnson, British field hockey player
- 22 January – Nick Gillingham, British swimmer
- 14 February – Sir Stelios Haji-Ioannou, Greek-Cypriot-born entrepreneur, founder of easyJet
- 16 February – Matthew Cottle, actor
- 21 February – Neil Oliver, television presenter and archaeologist
- 25 February – Ed Balls, politician
- 27 February – Jony Ive, industrial designer
- 4 March – Sam Taylor-Johnson, born Samantha Taylor-Wood, English-born film director and photographer
- 7 March – Ruthie Henshall, actress, singer and dancer
- 11 March – John Barrowman, Scottish-born actor
- 15 March – Lisa Langford, English race walker
- 18 March – Miki Berenyi, British lead singer of Lush
- 21 March – Adrian Chiles, radio and television presenter
- 22 March – Joanne Malin, television presenter
- 24 March – Kwame Kwei-Armah, born Ian Roberts, British theatre director
- 2 April – Helen Chamberlain, British television presenter
- 6 April – Tanya Byron, English psychologist
- 15 April – Frankie Poullain, British bassist (The Darkness)
- 16 April – Sarah Vine, journalist
- 21 April – Sharon White, businesswoman
- 22 April – Sandra Douglas, British sprinter and Olympic medallist
- 25 April – Tim Davie, BBC television executive
- 26 April – Marianne Jean-Baptiste, British actress

=== May – August ===
- 2 May – David Rocastle, English footballer (died 2001)
- 4 May – Kate Garraway, English broadcaster and journalist
- 10 May – Jon Ronson, Welsh-born journalist and radio presenter
- 11 May – Apache Indian, English singer-songwriter and DJ
- 18 May – Martin Duffy, English keyboardist (died 2022)
- 20 May – Graham Brady, Conservative politician and MP for Altrincham and Sale West
- 21 May – Lemn Sissay, author and broadcaster
- 27 May
  - Paul Gascoigne, English footballer
  - Lou Gish, actress (died 2006)
- 29 May – Noel Gallagher, British musician (Oasis)
- 21 June – Tammy Miller, English field hockey player
- 29 June – Carl Hester, dressage rider
- June – Ivan Noble, British journalist (died 2005)
- 3 July – Katy Clark, Labour politician and trade union official, MP for North Ayrshire and Arran
- 12 July
  - George Freeman, politician
  - Kevin Painter, English darts player
- 16 July
  - Jules De Martino, singer-songwriter and bass player
  - Brian Mitchell, Australian politician
- 18 July – Paul Cornell, British television writer
- 19 July – Rageh Omaar, broadcaster
- 22 July
  - Lauren Booth, British journalist
  - Monique Javer, English tennis player
- 24 July – Darren Bicknell, English cricketer
- 26 July – Jason Statham, English actor
- July – Zanny Minton Beddoes, financial journalist
- 3 August – Skin (Deborah Dyer), indie rock singer-songwriter
- 15 August – Tony Hand, Scottish ice hockey player
- 24 August – Michael Thomas, English footballer
- 26 August – Michael Gove, Conservative politician
- 28 August – Greg Clark, Conservative politician and MP for Tunbridge Wells

=== September – December ===
- 1 September – Steve Pemberton, English comedy writer and performer (The League of Gentlemen)
- 5 September – Jane Sixsmith, English field hockey player
- 7 September – Toby Jones, British actor (Infamous)
- 18 September – Tara FitzGerald, English actress
- 24 September – Peter Drury, English football commentator
- 26 September – Denise Coates, English businesswoman
- 1 October – Mike Smith, cricketer (d. 2026)
- 5 October
  - Guy Pearce, British-born Australian-based actor
  - Dorian West, Welsh-born English rugby player
- 14 October – Jason Plato, racing driver and television host
- 16 October – Davina McCall, British television presenter and UK Big Brother host
- 20 October – Monica Ali, British novelist
- 21 October – Paul Ince, English footballer
- 26 October – Douglas Alexander, Labour politician
- 29 October – Rufus Sewell, actor
- 30 October – Gavin Rossdale, English musician
- 14 November – Letitia Dean, British actress
- 15 November
  - Wayne Harrison, English footballer (d. 2013)
  - Dom Joly, Lebanese-English comedian and journalist
- 24 November – Shahid Malik, Labour politician
- 2 December – Bambos Charalambous, English politician
- 3 December – Stephen K. Amos, comedian
- 14 December – Ian Hamilton, footballer (d. 2023)
- 23 December – Tim Fountain, author and playwright

== Deaths ==
- 4 January – Donald Campbell, English water and land speed record seeker (born 1921)
- 3 February – Joe Meek, record producer (born 1929)
- 4 February – Albert Orsborn, 6th General of The Salvation Army (born 1886)
- 8 February – Victor Gollancz, British publisher (born 1893)
- 6 March – John Haden Badley, English author (born 1865)
- 12 May – John Masefield, English poet and novelist (born 1878)
- 1 June – Derek McCulloch ("Uncle Mac"), presenter for BBC children's programmes (born 1897)
- 3 June
  - Arthur Ransome, author and journalist (born 1884)
  - Arthur Tedder, 1st Baron Tedder, Marshal of the Royal Air Force (born 1890)
- 21 June – Edward Twining, Baron Twining, diplomat, Governor of North Borneo and of Tanganyika (born 1899)
- 7 July – Vivien Leigh, English actress (born 1913)
- 13 July – Tom Simpson, English road racing cyclist (born 1937)
- 21 July – Basil Rathbone, actor (born 1892 in South Africa)
- 27 July – John Moore, author and conservationist (born 1907)
- 9 August – Joe Orton, English playwright (born 1933)
- 26 August – Dame Helen Gwynne-Vaughan, English botanist and mycologist (born 1879)
- 27 August – Brian Epstein, English band manager (The Beatles) (born 1934)
- 28 August – Maurice Elvey, English film director (born 1887)
- 1 September – Siegfried Sassoon, British poet (born 1886)
- 6 September – Albert Ingham, English mathematician (born 1900)
- 18 September – John Cockcroft, English physicist, Nobel Prize laureate (born 1897)
- 3 October – Malcolm Sargent, English conductor (born 1895)
- 7 October – Norman Angell, British politician, recipient of the Nobel Peace Prize (born 1872)
- 8 October – Clement Attlee, Prime Minister of the United Kingdom (born 1893)
- 9 October – Cyril Norman Hinshelwood, English chemist, Nobel Prize laureate (born 1897)
- 4 November – June Thorburn, English actress (born 1931); killed in the Blackwood Hill air crash
- 13 November
  - Sir George Beamish, Irish rugby player and Royal Air Force air marshal (born 1905)
  - Harriet Cohen, English pianist (born 1895)
- 4 December – Daniel Jones, British phonetician (born 1881)
- 26 December – Sydney Barnes, English cricketer (born 1873)

== See also ==
- 1967 in British music
- 1967 in British television
- List of British films of 1967
