= Don Pierson =

American politician (1925–1996)

Donald Grey Pierson (October 11, 1925 – March 30, 1996) was an American businessman and civic leader in Eastland, Texas. He founded the British pirate stations Wonderful Radio London, Swinging Radio England and Britain Radio during the 1960s. He also attempted to create free ports on the islands of Tortuga, Haiti and Dominica during the 1970s.

== Brief biography ==
=== Early life ===
After graduating from Abilene High School in 1943, Pierson attended the University of Texas at Austin. He served as a gunnery instructor in the US Army Air Forces prior to the end of World War II. After the War, he continued his education at Baptist-affiliated Hardin-Simmons University in Abilene while he also worked as an automobile salesman.

=== Business interests ===
In 1948, he married the former Francis Annette Grubbs and, at the age of 21, acquired his first car dealership, a Dodge-Plymouth agency in Comanche. After opening his second dealership in 1953 for Oldsmobile-Cadillac in Eastland, he went on to establish a number of other automobile dealerships in Texas selling such makes as Volkswagen, Hillman, Renault, Triumph, Jaguar, Porsche, and BMW.

Don Pierson's other business ventures included a department store, a bowling facility, cable television, restaurants, oil investments, home banking, a slot car raceway, and farming and ranching operations. In 1963, he established U.S. Telephonics, the world's first computer telemarketing company and together, with a number of Abilene business leaders, he founded the Abilene National Bank (now Bank One - Abilene) in 1964 and served as the chairman of the board of the bank.

=== Mayor of Eastland ===
Although he was a soft-spoken individual, Pierson was also an untiring booster of his adopted hometown of Eastland. In 1957, he reopened the long-closed grass-strip Eastland airport which he renamed "Eastland International Airport." Later, in the 1970s, he became the first person to land a jet aircraft in Eastland.

He attracted world headlines when, as mayor of Eastland in 1964, he convinced his fellow council members to pass a purported ordinance banning all smoking in Eastland, with a mandatory three-year jail penalty for violators. It was intended as a humorous response to the Surgeon General's Commission on Smoking, whose recently issued report on the dangers of smoking had been accompanied by an official photo showing the commissioners' ashtrays overflowing with cigarette butts. The Eastland anti-smoking ordinance proved prophetic, although, at the time, it generated a deluge of hate mail from the outraged citizens of Winston-Salem, North Carolina.

Soon after, Eastland again found itself in the headlines when, as president of the local Rotary Club, and at the height of the Cold War, Pierson managed to convince the Deputy Soviet Ambassador to the United States, Vladimir Alkimov, to appear as the featured speaker at the club's weekly meeting.

=== Pirate radio ===
In 1964, his interests took him to the UK, after reading The Dallas Morning News. The newspaper carried a report of the start-up of Radio Caroline and Radio Atlanta from ships at that time anchored off the coastline of Southeast England.

In a 1984 interview, Pierson said he was captivated by the fact that these two offshore stations were the first and only all-day commercial radio broadcasters serving the UK. Pierson compared this with the number of stations then serving the population of his native Northwest Texas and realized that a UK radio operation could generate a lot of money. He caught the next available "red eye" flight to London from Dallas Love Field. On arriving, he chartered a small plane and flew over the two existing radio ships in the North Sea. After taking some photographs, he returned to Texas determined to create a station bigger and better than either of them.

The result was Radio London, which started transmitting on December 16, 1964, from the MV Galaxy, a former World War II United States Navy US Minesweeper. Radio London stopped transmitting August 14, 1967, when the Marine Broadcasting Offences Act came into effect in the United Kingdom. This law made it a criminal offence for any person to supply music, commentary, advertising, fuel, food, water or any other assistance (except for life-saving purposes) to any ship, offshore structure or aircraft used for broadcasting without a licence.

Between May 3, 1966, and November 13, 1966, Pierson ran radio stations Swinging Radio England and Britain Radio from the MV Olga Patricia (later renamed MV Laissez Faire), a World War II vessel built in the US as a supply ship. The two stations shared a studio and transmitter.

In the years that followed Don Pierson attempted to launch three more offshore radio station ventures. The first was off the coast of New York using the ship that had been the former home of Swinging Radio England and Britain Radio but under the call sign of Wonderful Radio London. He then engaged in plans to use a new ship as the home of Wonderful Radio London which would broadcast from off the coast of California.

Don Pierson re-entered the world of broadcasting during 1981 when he founded radio station KVMX-FM close to his home in Eastland, Texas. One of the local programs added to the station was the Wonderful Radio London Top 40 Show which by 1983 had evolved into a new company called Wonderful Radio London International with the intention of restarting the offshore station of the 1960s from a new ship off anchored once again off the coast of England. Although this plan failed to develop, a small syndicated programming network was formed using that name over XERF, KXOL in Fort Worth, Texas and KVMX.

=== Haitian Freeport ===
In 1967, during the time that Don Pierson was attempting to lease the ship which had been the former homes of Swinging Radio England and Britain Radio, he received a response from the Ambassador for Haiti in Washington, DC. Don Pierson's original plan was to lease or sell the ship to the government of Haiti for it to establish two powerful 50 kW commercial radio stations aimed at American tourists visiting the old buccaneer stronghold of Tortuga island, which is located some 10 miles off the north coast of the main Haitian island of Hispaniola which is also shared by the Dominican Republic.

This offer became a plan to develop the island itself as a freeport and he was asked to assist the government of Haiti to encourage business investment in that poverty-stricken land. After years of research and negotiation, Don Pierson's idea of a privately financed, privately managed free enterprise zone became a reality in 1971 when Haitian dictator François Duvalier (known as "Papa Doc") and the Haitian government entered into a 99-year contract with Don Pierson's company called Dupont Caribbean Inc. This contract provided for the establishment of Freeport Tortuga.

Within 18 months Don Pierson succeeded in building the island's first airport, a loading dock for seagoing vessels, a rudimentary water and sewer system, an electricity generating facility, and six miles of paved road. Of equal importance. the project created jobs for some 400 previously unemployed Haitians and resulted in the establishment of a small school to teach various job skills. During this period he also became Honorary Consul of the Republic of Haiti to Texas from 1969 through 1974.

Tragically, the free port project came to abrupt end in 1974 when, after it was announced that Gulf Oil Corporation was contemplating investing more than $300 million to build a resort on the island, the government of Jean-Claude Duvalier (known as "Baby Doc"), summarily expropriated the project, resulting in its collapse.

A similar venture on the island of Dominica which was attempted in the wake of the failed project in Haiti, also met with disaster following governmental turmoil in Dominica.

== Pierson family ==
In his personal and private life Don Pierson was a longtime member of the First Presbyterian Church of Eastland. He was preceded in death by his parents, Ryce and Hazel Pierson, and his brother Ryce Pierson Jr. and survived by his wife Annette; his sisters, his son, his daughter, and two grandchildren.
