= Perfumed Garden =

Perfumed Garden or variants may refer to:

- "Perfumed garden", song by Michael Fall from Turn On Your Radio, 2013
- "Perfumed Garden", song by Ray Manzarek from The Whole Thing Started With Rock & Roll Now It's Out of Control, 1977
- "Perfumed Garden", song by Richard Anthony Hewson from Going Up, 1983

== See also ==
- The Perfumed Garden, 15th-century Arabic-language sex manual
- The Perfumed Garden (radio show), 1967 late-night radio programme
