= The Settlers (band) =

English folk band

- Origin: West Midlands, England
- Genres: Folk, easy-listening, pop
- Years active: 1964–1981, 2018–2021
- Labels: Decca, London, Pye (including Marble Arch), Columbia, Island, York Records, Riverdale Records, York Records
- Members: Steve Somers-Smith; Patty Vetta; Dave Smith; Tony Harris
- Past members: Cindy Kent; Mike Jones; John Fyffe; Mansel Davies; Geoff Srdzinski; Andie Sheridan; Paul Greedus; Chris Johnstone; George Jeffrey; Valery Ann
- Website: thesettlers.co.uk

The Settlers were an English folk-oriented music group, originally from the English West Midlands, who formed in the mid-1960s. The band folded in the early 1980s, relaunched in 2018, and disbanded again in 2021.

== Formation and genre ==
The group started as a trio, but almost immediately expanded by adding a bassist to their line-up. The original members were:

- Cynthia "Cindy" Kent MBE (vocals and tambourine), born 7 August 1945, Oldbury, Worcestershire;
- Mike Jones (vocals and guitar), born Michael Edwin Jones, 16 September 1943, Burton-on-Trent, Staffordshire, died 11 May 2008, Exeter, Devon;
- John Fyffe (banjo), born 3 July 1943, Uddingston, South Lanarkshire, Scotland;
- Mansel Davies (double bass), born 22 March 1942, New Quay, Ceredigion, Wales.

The Settlers were initially known as the Birmingham Folk Four, in July 1963 but became known as the Settlers after the relative success of their first single, "Settle Down". A six-month residency on a BBC television series, Singalong, led to support bookings on tours with, among others, Dusty Springfield, Roy Orbison and the Small Faces. The Settlers have generally been referred to as a folk group. However, like the Seekers, the successful Australian group with which they shared marked similarities, some of their material gravitated towards mainstream pop which, taking its cue from American singer-songwriters Bob Dylan and Joan Baez and such groups as Peter, Paul and Mary, We Five, and The Byrds, readily absorbed folk influences in various ways in the mid-1960s. The Settlers’ melodic style was largely settled before the advent of British folk-rock in the guise of Fairport Convention and Pentangle later in the sixties.

In 1969, the band appeared with Cliff Richard, Una Stubbs, and William Hartnell amongst others in Life With Johnny, a six-part religious-themed drama serial on ITV. The series, produced by Tyne Tees TV, was not networked and thus reached a limited audience. Only three of the six episodes have survived.

== Early musical output ==
The Settlers' first single, "Sassafras"/"Settle Down", was released in 1964. They became quite well known nationally, assisted by frequent appearances on television and, until 1967, regular exposure on offshore pirate radio stations. In particular, their recording of John Lennon and Paul McCartney's "Nowhere Man" (1965) was, together with the Overlanders' 1966 UK No.1 hit, "Michelle", and the Truth's version of "Girl", among the best known covers of songs from the Beatles' album Rubber Soul (1965). However, although "Nowhere Man" reached a high of No.5 in Radio London's non-sales-based Fab 40 in March 1966 and the group's spirited version of Gordon Lightfoot's "Early Morning Rain" received a good deal of airplay in May 1966, the Settlers did not succeed in enjoying a Top 40 hit during the 1960s. Their most successful record, "The Lightning Tree" (helped along due to its use as the theme tune of the British TV series Follyfoot), reached No. 36 in the UK Singles Chart in 1971.

Like the Seekers, the group also included a double bassist. The original bassist, Mansel Davies, left in 1965 to pursue a career in teaching and was replaced by Geoff Srdzinski (born Geoffrey Srodzinski, 10 June 1946, Plymouth, Devon), who shared accommodation in Hampstead, London, with Tony Hooper of Strawbs. Hooper's song "Always on My Mind" was released as a single by the Settlers early in 1967.

Cindy Kent (like Judith Durham of the Seekers) attracted her own share of attention as the most recognizable face of the Settlers. Originally known for her fine singing voice, photogenic good looks, and tendency to wear mini-skirts, later her public espousal of Christianity became the media focus, particularly when it brought her into contact with the singer Cliff Richard, a prominent born again Christian, and they jointly contributed to various events with a Christian theme. Kent was later ordained as a priest in the Church of England.

Shortly after recording a religious album, I Am Your Servant, in 1973, Kent left the group and later released a solo single, "I Only Want To Be In The World", on the Beeb label in 1975 before moving into radio broadcasting.

== Later musical output ==
After the departure of Cindy Kent, the line up transitioned from acoustic four-part pop folk harmony, to a more contemporary five-piece electric sound with Mike Jones (guitar/banjo/vocals), Andie Sheridan (Kent's replacement as female vocals), Paul Greedus (guitar/vocals), Chris Johnstone (bass/vocals), and George Jeffrey on drums. In 1974 this line up recorded an album for York Records, entitled The New Sound of the Settlers.

In 1976 the line up disbanded and Mike Jones advertised for players. Steve Somers-Smith, a young singer/songwriter from Burnham-on-Crouch, Essex, had won the National TV talent show ‘New Faces’ with one of his own songs ‘Mavis Brown’ in late 1975 under the name Steve Cockburn, a name given to him by a manager, as a certain port was popular at the time. Mike Jones asked Steve Somers (as he was also known) to audition at his flat in Hendon, London. The two decided it was a working relationship. Cindy Kent and Paul Greedus (on electric bass) were invited to play a few gigs while replacements were found. Cindy Kent was busy with many other projects and many replacement female singers were tried, some very last minute, being picked up on route to the gig and rehearsed in the van on the way.

In early 1976, Valery Ann (also known as Valeryan and as Valerie Anne Lawrence), who had released an original song "My Love Loves Me" on Decca in 1965 while she was still at school was auditioned at Mike's flat to replace Andie Sheridan joined Mike Jones, Paul Greedus and drummer George Jeffry BEFORE Steve Smith (later known as Steve Somers-Smith). It was this line up that went into the studios to record "Whichaway Billy" for Riverdale. The single was released in October 1976, by which time Valery Ann (after only 9 months in the band) had already left to pursue a solo career. She was replaced by numerous other female singers until Patty Vetta, a rising talent on the British Folk scene. Steve Somers-Smith had a double bass playing friend called Pete Holder, who had been playing at the Savoy hotel in London for 13 years and was looking for a change. Pete Holder joined the group and the original acoustic, close harmony sound of the Settlers was re established.

- Mike Jones (guitar/banjo/fiddle/vocals);
- Pete Holder (Double bass);
- Steve Somers-Smith (vocals/guitar/banjo);
- Patty Vetta (vocals/tambourine).

Mike Jones was the last remaining original member when the band broke up in 1981.

== Albums ==
The Settlers' albums included their debut Sing Out for Decca Records in the UK, and London Records in the US (1964), which featured an eclectically varied selection of folk songs, including "The Keeper", "Over the Stone", "The Three Jolly Rogues of Lynn", "The Golden Vanity", Ewan MacColl's "Dirty Old Town" and "Shoals of Herring", Matt McGinn's "Coorie Doon", and "Frog Went A-Courtin'"

Whereas Go!, (Pye Records, 1966) paired the group with The Overlanders both separately and together. The eponymous The Settlers, for (Island Records, 1967) included Bob Dylan's "Blowin' in the Wind" and "Mr Tambourine Man" and such folk standards as "The Wreck of the Old 97". Call Again for (Marble Arch Records, 1969) collected the group's singles output for Pye Records, and was released after they had left that record label.

Settlers Alive for (Columbia Records, 1970) was recorded live at Queen Elizabeth Hall the previous year, whilst Sing a New Song (Myrrh, 1972), had a strongly religious component. Lightning Tree (York, 1972), which, in addition to the title hit, included extracts, spoken by Cindy Kent, from Martin Luther King Jr.’s 1963 speech "I Have a Dream". Lightning Tree was re-released by Decca in 1974 as The World of the Settlers .

== Relaunch in 2018 ==
Following its break-up, band members continued to provide backing music services to the BBC for a number of years.

In 2018 the Settlers relaunched. Steve Somers-Smith and Patty Vetta were in the line-up joined by Tony Harris and musician/manager Dave Smith. In 2019 the band released Resettled, its first album release for 37 years, to little notice, and folded once more in 2021.
