= Paul Kaye (broadcaster) =

British broadcaster

Paul Kaye (born Paul De Kazarine; 17 February 1934 – 4 November 1980) was a British radio broadcaster from Barnstaple in North Devon.

== Biography ==
After leaving school, he worked in repertory theatre and in 1952, became stage manager to a theatre company in Nairobi. He volunteered for the Kenyan police and saw active service during the Mau Mau emergency. He began working on the country's radio network and later broadcast in both Cyprus and Canada.

=== Radio work ===
Paul Kaye was a DJ and head of news on the offshore radio station Radio London and was the first and last voice to be heard on the station that broadcast from 23 December 1964 to 14 August 1967. Radio London was the first of the UK (pirate) offshore stations to operate a news service and Kaye was the news chief. His bulletins were on the half-hour, which conveniently gave him just enough time to re-write the BBC news which was broadcast on the hour.

Kaye also presented programmes, especially in the early months of the station, and his theme was "Town Talk" by Ken Woodman and his Piccadilly Brass, a tune later used on the BBC by Jimmy Young. In August 1967, the Marine Broadcasting Offences Act became law and the first voice on Radio London became the last as Paul closed the station down. Kaye later went on to present for Radio Luxembourg, followed by a syndicated jazz programme for Radio Hallam, Radio Tees and Pennine Radio.

=== Television work ===
Throughout the 1970s, Kaye was a continuity announcer for Yorkshire Television working alongside Radio London colleagues John Crosse and Earl Richmond as well as Redvers Kyle, Keith Martin and Terry Davis.

=== Death ===
Kaye died on 4 November 1980 aged 46.
