= Radio London =

Current use:

- BBC Radio London, the BBC's local station for London

Radio London may historically refer to:

- A popular name for the BBC World Service in Nazi-occupied Europe during World War II
- Radio Londres, broadcasts made by the Free French Forces via the BBC during World War II
- Wonderful Radio London, also known as "Radio London" and The "Big L", an offshore pirate radio station
