= List of British films of 1967 =

A list of films produced in the United Kingdom in 1967 (see 1967 in film):

== 1967 ==
Title	Director	Cast	Genre	Notes
1967
Accident	Joseph Losey	Dirk Bogarde, Stanley Baker, Jacqueline Sassard	Drama	
Africa Texas Style	Andrew Marton	John Mills, Hugh O'Brian, Nigel Green	Adventure	
Attack on the Iron Coast	Paul Wendkos	Lloyd Bridges, Andrew Keir, Sue Lloyd	War adventure	
Battle Beneath the Earth	Montgomery Tully	Kerwin Mathews, Robert Ayres, Peter Arne	Sci-fi	
Bedazzled	Stanley Donen	Peter Cook, Dudley Moore, Raquel Welch	Comedy	
Berserk!	Jim O'Connolly	Joan Crawford, Ty Hardin, Diana Dors	Horror thriller	
Billion Dollar Brain	Ken Russell	Michael Caine, Françoise Dorléac, Oskar Homolka	Spy thriller	Co-production with US & Finland; Based on Len Deighton's novel
The Bobo	Robert Parrish	Peter Sellers, Britt Ekland, Rossano Brazzi	Comedy	
Carry On Doctor	Gerald Thomas	Kenneth Williams, Jim Dale, Frankie Howerd	Comedy	
Casino Royale	Ken Hughes, John Huston, Joseph McGrath, Robert Parrish, Val Guest	David Niven, Peter Sellers, Ursula Andress	Comedy	
A Challenge for Robin Hood	C.M. Pennington-Richards	Barrie Ingham, Peter Blythe, John Arnatt	Adventure	
A Countess from Hong Kong	Charles Chaplin	Marlon Brando, Sophia Loren, Tippi Hedren	Drama	Chaplin's last film as a director
Cuckoo Patrol	Duncan Wood	Freddie Garrity, Kenneth Connor, John Le Mesurier	Comedy musical	
Danger Route	Seth Holt	Richard Johnson, Carol Lynley, Barbara Bouchet	Spy thriller	
The Day the Fish Came Out	Michael Cacoyannis	Tom Courtenay, Sam Wanamaker, Candice Bergen	Comedy	
Deadlier Than the Male	Ralph Thomas	Richard Johnson, Elke Sommer, Sylva Koscina	Thriller	
The Deadly Affair	Sidney Lumet	James Mason, Simone Signoret, Harry Andrews	Spy	Based on John le Carré's novel
Doctor Faustus	Richard Burton, Nevill Coghill	Elizabeth Taylor, Richard Burton, Hugh Williams	Drama	
The Double Man	Franklin J. Schaffner	Yul Brynner, Britt Ekland, Clive Revill	Thriller	
Far from the Madding Crowd	John Schlesinger	Julie Christie, Alan Bates, Terence Stamp, Peter Finch	Literary drama	Number 79 in the list of BFI Top 100 British films
Fathom	Leslie H. Martinson	Raquel Welch, Anthony Franciosa, Richard Briers	Comedy thriller	
The Fearless Vampire Killers	Roman Polanski	Jack MacGowran, Sharon Tate, Alfie Bass	Comedy horror	Co-production with US
Five Golden Dragons	Jeremy Summers	Bob Cummings, Margaret Lee, Rupert Davies	Mystery	
Follow That Camel	Gerald Thomas	Phil Silvers, Kenneth Williams, Jim Dale	Comedy	
Frankenstein Created Woman	Terence Fisher	Peter Cushing, Susan Denberg, Thorley Walters	Horror	
Half a Sixpence	George Sidney	Tommy Steele, Julia Foster, Cyril Ritchard	Musical	
Hell Is Empty	John Ainsworth, Bernard Knowles	Martine Carol, Anthony Steel, James Robertson Justice	Crime	Co-production with Czechoslovakia
How I Won the War	Richard Lester	Michael Crawford, John Lennon	WWII dark comedy	
I'll Never Forget What's'isname	Michael Winner	Oliver Reed, Carol White	Drama	
It!	Herbert J. Leder	Roddy McDowall, Jill Haworth	Science fiction	
The Jokers	Michael Winner	Michael Crawford, Oliver Reed	Comedy	
Jules Verne's Rocket to the Moon	Don Sharp	Burl Ives, Terry-Thomas, Gert Fröbe	Sci-fi/comedy	
Just like a Woman	Robert Fuest	Wendy Craig, Francis Matthews	Comedy	
The Last Safari	Henry Hathaway	Kaz Garas, Stewart Granger	Adventure	
The Long Duel	Ken Annakin	Yul Brynner, Trevor Howard	Action	
The Magnificent Two	Cliff Owen	Eric Morecambe, Ernie Wise	Comedy	
The Man Outside	Samuel Gallu	Van Heflin, Heidelinde Weis	Thriller	
Marat/Sade	Peter Brook	Ian Richardson, Patrick Magee Glenda Jackson	Drama	Film adaptation of the play
Maroc 7	Gerry O'Hara	Gene Barry, Elsa Martinelli	Thriller	
The Mikado	Stuart Burge	Valerie Masterson, John Reed	Musical	
The Mini-Affair	Robert Anram	Georgie Fame, Rosemary Nicols	Romance/comedy	
Mister Ten Per Cent	Peter Graham Scott	Charlie Drake, Derek Nimmo, Wanda Ventham, John Le Mesurier	Comedy	
The Mummy's Shroud	John Gilling	André Morell, John Phillips, Elizabeth Sellars	Horror	
The Naked Runner	Sidney J. Furie	Frank Sinatra, Edward Fox, Peter Vaughan	Spy	
Night of the Big Heat	Terence Fisher	Christopher Lee, Patrick Allen, Peter Cushing	Sci-fi/horror	
The Night of the Generals	Anatole Litvak	Peter O'Toole, Omar Sharif	Thriller	Co-production with France
Our Mother's House	Jack Clayton	Dirk Bogarde, Pamela Franklin, Mark Lester	Drama	
The Penthouse	Peter Collinson	Suzy Kendall, Terence Morgan, Tony Beckley	Drama	
The Plank	Eric Sykes	Eric Sykes, Tommy Cooper	Comedy	
Poor Cow	Ken Loach	Terence Stamp, Carol White, John Bindon	Drama	
Pretty Polly	Guy Green	Hayley Mills, Shashi Kapoor, Trevor Howard	Romance/comedy	
Privilege	Peter Watkins	Paul Jones, Jean Shrimpton	Comedy/musical	
The Projected Man	Ian Curteis, John Croydon	Mary Peach, Bryant Haliday	Science fiction	
Quatermass and the Pit	Roy Ward Baker	James Donald, Andrew Keir	Science fiction	
Ride of the Valkyrie	Peter Brook	Julia Foster, Zero Mostel, Frank Thornton	Comedy	Short film
Robbery	Peter Yates	Stanley Baker, Joanna Pettet	Crime/drama	
The Sailor from Gibraltar	Tony Richardson	Jeanne Moreau, Ian Bannen	Drama	
The Scorpio Letters	Richard Thorpe	Alex Cord, Shirley Eaton, Laurence Naismith	Thriller	
The Shuttered Room	David Greene	Gig Young, Carol Lynley, Oliver Reed, Flora Robson	Horror	
The Sky Bike	Charles Frend	Liam Redmond, William Lucas	Family	
Smashing Time	Desmond Davis	Rita Tushingham, Lynn Redgrave	Comedy	
Some May Live	Vernon Sewell	Peter Cushing, Joseph Cotten	Thriller	
The Sorcerers	Michael Reeves	Boris Karloff, Catherine Lacey	Horror	
Stranger in the House	Pierre Rouve	James Mason, Geraldine Chaplin	Crime	
The Terrornauts	Montgomery Tully	Simon Oates, Zena Marshall, Charles Hawtrey	Sci-fi	
They Came from Beyond Space	Freddie Francis	Robert Hutton, Jennifer Jayne	Sci-fi	
To Sir, with Love	James Clavell	Sidney Poitier, Judy Geeson, Lulu	Drama	
Torture Garden	Freddie Francis	Burgess Meredith, Jack Palance	Horror	
Two for the Road	Stanley Donen	Audrey Hepburn, Albert Finney, William Daniels, Eleanor Bron	Comedy	
Two Weeks in September	Serge Bourguignon	Brigitte Bardot, Laurent Terzieff	Drama	Co-production with France
Ulysses	Joseph Strick	Milo O'Shea, Barbara Jefford	Drama	Co-production with the United States
The Vengeance of Fu Manchu	Jeremy Summers	Christopher Lee, Douglas Wilmer, Tsai Chin	Action/drama	
The Viking Queen	Don Chaffey	Don Murray, Carita	Historical	
The Vulture	Lawrence Huntington	Robert Hutton, Akim Tamiroff	Sci-fi/horror	
The Whisperers	Bryan Forbes	Edith Evans, Eric Portman, Gerald Sim	Drama	Evans won the Silver Bear for Best Actress at Berlin.
The White Bus	Lindsay Anderson	Arthur Lowe, Patricia Healey	Drama	Short film
The Winter's Tale	Frank Dunlop	Laurence Harvey, Jane Asher	Comedy	
You Only Live Twice	Lewis Gilbert	Sean Connery, Donald Pleasence	Spy/action	

== See also ==
- 1967 in British music
- 1967 in British radio
- 1967 in British television
- 1967 in the United Kingdom
