= 1967 in British television =

This is a list of British television related events from 1967.

== Events ==
=== January ===
- 3 January – Children's stop-motion animation series Trumpton is the second programme on BBC1 to be shot in colour and to show the copyright year in the end credits.
- 7 January – Debut of The Forsyte Saga, a blockbuster BBC dramatisation (the last to be made in black and white) in 26 50-minute episodes originally shown on BBC2. Because of the restricted number of viewers who can receive this channel, it is not until it begins BBC1 Sunday evening repeats on 8 September that it reaches a large audience which will build to 18 million and cause some church services to be rescheduled; it is also popular internationally and becomes the first British television programme ever to be sold to the Soviet Union.
- 9 January – The long-running children's educational programme Look and Read debuts on BBC1.

=== February ===
- 3 February – David Frost confronts fraudster Emil Savundra on Rediffusion London's The Frost Programme.
- 28 February – National and regional newspapers carry advertisements from the Independent Television Authority requesting applicants for various new ITV contracts, one of which is Programme Contractor for Yorkshire Area (Contract D) – All Week. Ten formal bids are received by the closing date.

=== April ===
- 4 April – BBC1 shows a Tom and Jerry cartoon for the first time, commencing with the 1942 short 'Dog Trouble'. The hugely popular Hanna-Barbera characters are shown twice weekly on Tuesdays and Thursdays, and go on to be screened continually on the BBC throughout many decades.
- 8 April – The United Kingdom wins the 12th Eurovision Song Contest in Vienna, Austria. The winning song is "Puppet on a String" performed (barefoot) by Sandie Shaw. It is broadcast live on BBC1.

=== June ===
- 12 June – The 1967 franchise round sees a number of changes being made to the ITV regional map which will take effect from May to August 1968:
  - Any split weekday/weekend licences are removed in all regions, except London.
  - The London split is moved from Friday/Saturday to Friday at 7pm.
  - The North of England region is split into the North West and Yorkshire.
  - Granada, the existing weekday contractor for the North of England region, is given a seven-day licence for the new North West of England region.
  - Lord Thomson of Fleet is required to divest himself of most of his holding in Scottish Television.
  - A new company, Telefusion Yorkshire, later renamed Yorkshire Television, is given the licence to broadcast in the newly created Yorkshire region.
  - ATV wins the new seven-day Midlands licence, replacing ABC at the weekend.
  - ABC and Rediffusion, London are asked to form a joint company to take the London weekday franchise previously held by Rediffusion alone, the result, Thames Television, is 51% controlled by ABC.
  - The London Television Consortium, put together by David Frost wins the London weekend contract which now includes Friday evenings from 7pm. They go on air as London Weekend Television.
  - Most controversially, TWW loses its franchise for Wales and the West of England to Harlech Television which later becomes known as HTV on the arrival of UHF.
- 25 June – The Our World programme airs to over 30 countries featuring performers from the represented countries, the segment for the United Kingdom features The Beatles performing "All You Need Is Love", with guests Mick Jagger, Marianne Faithfull, Keith Richards, Keith Moon, Eric Clapton, Pattie Harrison, Jane Asher, Graham Nash, Hunter Davies and others.

=== July ===
- 1 July
  - BBC2 becomes Europe's first colour TV broadcaster, showing about five hours of colour programming every week as part of a "launching period", starting with live coverage from the Wimbledon Championships. The full colour service would launch in December.
  - Debut of the game show The Golden Shot on ITV. Initially presented by Canadian entertainer Jackie Rae, he would soon be replaced by the show's best known host Bob Monkhouse and would become hugely popular.
- 2 July – The BBC's colour Test Card F, featuring Carole Hersee, is broadcast for the first time.
- 3 July – News at Ten premieres on ITV. It airs for half an hour nightly on weeknights until 1999 before being axed. It is then reintroduced in 2001, axed again in 2004 and brought back for a second time in 2008.
- 8–9 July – BBC1 broadcasts The Great Climb, covering ascents of the Old Man of Hoy in Orkney in real time, which attracts around 15 million viewers.

=== September ===
- 29 September
  - The Prisoner has its UK premiere on ATV and Grampian Television. The world premiere of the series occurs on 5 September when the series debuts on CTV in Canada.
  - Captain Scarlet and the Mysterons, the popular science fiction Supermarionation series created by Gerry and Sylvia Anderson debuts on ITV.

=== October ===
- 13 October – Omnibus, an arts documentary series, begins on BBC1.
- 16 October – ITV Granada shows the silent 1922 German expressionist horror film Nosferatu.
- 23 October – Service Information is broadcast by the BBC for the first time. The bulletins are broadcast three times each weekday on BBC2.

=== November ===
- The live BBC1 broadcast of the 1967 Miss World competition is watched by over 23 million viewers.

=== December ===
- 2 December – BBC 2 officially launches its full colour service with a special production of Billy Smart's Circus, at 6.30 pm. This occasion also marks the debut of a new logo and ident: the "cubed 2", which would be used in various forms until the end of 1974. Also shown this evening is the first episode of Vanity Fair, the first drama serial by the BBC to be produced in colour.
- 22 December – Dante's Inferno, Ken Russell's television film about Dante Gabriel Rossetti is shown in the Omnibus series.
- 25 December – The final edition of The Sooty Show is shown on the BBC after being cancelled by Paul Fox, the controller of BBC1. Part of the reason for the cancellation is due to his decision to clear out long-running programmes on the channel to make way for new shows. The Sooty Show will return next year on ITV, being produced by the newly launched London franchise Thames Television.
- 26 December
  - The Beatles' made-for-television musical film Magical Mystery Tour airs on BBC1 in the UK in black and white.
  - Comedy sketch show Do Not Adjust Your Set, originally intended for children and made by Rediffusion London, premieres on ITV.

== Debuts ==
=== BBC1 ===
- 2 January – Sword of Honour (1967)
- 3 January – The Trumptonshire Trilogy: Trumpton (1967)
- 6 January – The Whitehall Worrier (1967)
- 7 January – The Forsyte Saga (1967)
- 15 January – Sir Arthur Conan Doyle (1967)
- 22 January – Great Expectations (1967)
- 24 February – The World of Wodehouse (1967)
- 4 April – Dee Time (1967–1969)
- 9 April – St. Ives (1967)
- 2 May – Further Adventures of Lucky Jim (1967)
- 4 April – Tom and Jerry (1940–1967)
- 8 May – Mickey Dunne (1967)
- 21 May – The Further Adventures of the Musketeers (1967)
- 26 May – Not in Front of the Children (1967–1970)
- 28 May – Champion House (1967–1968)
- 12 June – Ask the Family (1967–1984)
- 20 June – Misleading Cases (1967–1971)
- 5 July – Rainbow City (1967)
- 1 August – Sorry I'm Single (1967)
- 4 August – Boy Meets Girl (1967–1969)
- 18 August – Whistle Stop (1967–1968)
- 28 August – The Queen's Traitor (1967)
- September – Batfink (1966–1967)
- 10 September – Pride and Prejudice (1967)
- 30 September – The Talk of the Town (1967–1974)
- 2 October – Belle and Sebastian (1967–1968) (Made in 1965)
- 3 October – A Series of Bird's (1967)
- 8 October – Ironside (1967–1975)
- 13 October – Omnibus (1967–2003)
- 22 October – Les Misérables (1967)
- 27 November – The Very Merry Widow (1967–1968)
- 26 December – Magical Mystery Tour (1967)
- Unknown
  - The Rolf Harris Show (1967–1970; 1972–1974)
  - Reksio (1967–1990)

=== BBC2 ===
- 9 January – Look and Read: Bob and Carol Look for Treasure (1967)
- 21 January – The Invaders (1967–1969)
- 30 January – Before the Fringe (1967)
- 4 February – Girl in a Black Bikini (1967)
- 18 March – The Paradise Makers (1967)
- 28 March – The Revenue Men (1967–1968)
- 27 April – Witch Hunt (1967)
- 3 June – This Way for Murder (1967)
- 12 June – Three of a Kind (1967)
- 22 July – Kenilworth (1967)
- 3 August – Face the Music (1967–1977: 1983–1984)
- 19 August – Angel Pavement (1967)
- 29 August – The Big M (1967)
- 16 September – The White Rabbit (1967)
- 28 October – Wuthering Heights (1967)
- 16 November – A Hundred Years of Humphrey Hastings (1967)
- 2 December – Vanity Fair (1967)
- 3 December – The World About Us (1967–1987)
- 10 December – The Charlie Drake Show (1967–1968)

=== ITV ===
- 2 January – Turn Out the Lights (1967)
- 6 January
  - Uncle Charles (1967)
  - Mr. Aitch (1967)
- 11 February – Who Is Sylvia? (1967)
- 15 February – At Last the 1948 Show (1967–1968)
- 17 February – Mr. Rose (1967–1968)
- 18 February – Never Mind the Quality, Feel the Width (1967–1971)
- 24 February – My Man Joe (1967)
- 30 March – Seven Deadly Virtues (1967)
- 1 April – Vacant Lot (1967)
- 3 April – Market in Honey Lane (1967–1969)
- 18 April – The Golden Age (1967)
- 23 April – Spindoe (1967)
- 15 May – The Jetsons (1962–1963)
- 16 May – Half Hour Story (1967–1968)
- 19 May – The Fellows (1967)
- 27 May – Trapped (1967)
- 6 June – Hancock's (1967)
- 27 June – Sam and Janet (1967–1968)
- 29 June – Sanctuary (1967–1968)
- 1 July – The Golden Shot (1967–1975)
- 3 July – Early Evening News (1967–1999)
- 6 July
  - Danger Island (1967)
  - Send Foster (1967)
- 8 July – Callan (1967–1972)
- 9 July – The Lion, the Witch and the Wardrobe (1967)
- 18 July – Escape (1967)
- 19 August – Haunted (1967–1968)
- 22 September – Baker's Half-Dozen (1967)
- 25 September
  - ITV Playhouse (1967–1982)
  - Sexton Blake (1967–1971)
- 26 September – The Gamblers (1967–1968)
- 27 September
  - Man in a Suitcase (1967–1968)
  - The Flower of Gloster (1967)
- 28 September – Mystery Hall (1967)
- 29 September
  - Captain Scarlet and the Mysterons (1967–1968)
  - Inheritance (1967)
  - The Prisoner (1967–1968)
- 7 October – Sat'day While Sunday (1967)
- 8 October – Skippy the Bush Kangaroo (1967–1970)
- 29 October – The Pilgrim's Progress (1967)
- 14 November – No – That's Me Over Here! (1967–1970)
- 8 December – City '68 (1967–1968)
- 26 December – Do Not Adjust Your Set (1967–1969)
- Unknown
  - Tarzan (1966–1968)
  - Mission: Impossible (1966–1973)

== Television shows ==
=== Changes of network affiliation ===
Shows	Moved from	Moved to
BBC Wimbledon	BBC1	BBC2
Sooty	BBC	ITV

== Continuing television shows ==
=== 1920s ===
- BBC Wimbledon (1927–1939, 1946–2019, 2021–2024)

=== 1930s ===
- Trooping the Colour (1937–1939, 1946–2019, 2023–present)
- The Boat Race (1938–1939, 1946–2019, 2021–present)
- BBC Cricket (1939, 1946–1999, 2020–2024)

=== 1940s ===
- The Ed Sullivan Show (1948–1971)
- Come Dancing (1949–1998)

=== 1950s ===
- Andy Pandy (1950–1970, 2002–2005)
- Watch with Mother (1952–1975)
- The Good Old Days (1953–1983)
- Panorama (1953–present)
- Take Your Pick! (1955–1968, 1992–1998)
- Double Your Money (1955–1968)
- Dixon of Dock Green (1955–1976)
- Crackerjack (1955–1970, 1972–1984, 2020–2021)
- ITV Wimbledon (1956–1968)
- Opportunity Knocks (1956–1978, 1987–1990)
- This Week (1956–1978, 1986–1992)
- Armchair Theatre (1956–1974)
- What the Papers Say (1956–2008)
- The Sky at Night (1957–present)
- Blue Peter (1958–present)
- Grandstand (1958–2007)

=== 1960s ===
- Coronation Street (1960–present)
- The Avengers (1961–1969)
- Songs of Praise (1961–present)
- The Saint (1962–1969)
- Z-Cars (1962–1978)
- Animal Magic (1962–1983)
- Doctor Who (1963–1989, 1996, 2005–present)
- World in Action (1963–2000)
- The Wednesday Play (1964–1970)
- Top of the Pops (1964–2006)
- Match of the Day (1964–present)
- Crossroads (1964–1988, 2001–2003)
- Play School (1964–1988)
- Mr. and Mrs. (1965–1999)
- The Newcomers (1965–1969)
- Not Only... But Also (1965–1970)
- World of Sport (1965–1985)
- Call My Bluff (1965–2005)
- Jackanory (1965–1996, 2006)
- Softly, Softly (1966–1969)
- The Trumptonshire Trilogy (1966–1969)
- All Gas and Gaiters (1966–1971)
- It's a Knockout (1966–1982, 1999–2001)
- The Money Programme (1966–2010)

== Ending this year ==
- Sunday Night at the London Palladium (1955–1967)
- Emergency Ward 10 (1957–1967)
- Hugh and I (1962–1967)
- The Illustrated Weekly Hudd (1966–1967)
- Batfink (1966–1967)

== Births ==
- 2 January – Ruth Gemmell, actress
- 7 January
  - Mark Lamarr, British comedian and broadcast presenter
  - Miranda Sawyer, journalist and broadcaster
- 14 January – Emily Watson, English actress
- 15 January – Paul J. Medford, actor
- 21 January – Tony Hirst, actor
- 16 February – Matthew Cottle, actor
- 21 February – Neil Oliver, archaeologist, historian, author and broadcaster
- 4 March
  - Deborah Turness, journalist and television executive
  - Tim Vine, actor and comedian, brother of Jeremy Vine
- 11 March – John Barrowman, Scottish-born actor
- 21 March – Adrian Chiles, television presenter
- 22 March – Joanne Malin, broadcaster and television presenter
- 2 April – Helen Chamberlain, television presenter
- 25 April – Tim Davie, BBC television executive
- 26 April – Marianne Jean-Baptiste, actress
- 4 May
  - Anna Botting, journalist and newsreader
  - Kate Garraway, journalist and television presenter
- 18 July – Paul Cornell, television writer
- 19 July – Rageh Omaar, broadcaster
- 22 July – Rhys Ifans, Welsh actor
- 26 July – Jason Statham, actor
- 19 August – Lucy Briers, actress
- 1 September – Steve Pemberton, comedy writer and performer (The League of Gentlemen)
- 18 September – Tara Fitzgerald, English actress
- 21 September – Christopher Price, television presenter (died 2002)
- 16 October – Davina McCall, English television presenter, Big Brother UK host
- 14 November – Letitia Dean, actress
- 15 November – Becky Anderson, journalist and newsreader

== Death ==
- 30 May – Claude Rains, actor, aged 77

== See also ==
- 1967 in British music
- 1967 in British radio
- 1967 in the United Kingdom
- List of British films of 1967
