= Radio Sovereign =

Radio Sovereign was a radio station that broadcast 'Golden Oldies' from their studios in Sherland Road, Twickenham, London.

== Description ==
Radio Sovereign was a pioneer pirate radio station which broadcast to West London. It established the potential for an all-oldies station, a format later adopted by Capital Gold and very common today.

The station was founded by John Kenning and Crispian St. John. Radio Sovereign commenced broadcasts on 10 May 1983 and closed down on 2 January 1984. The original frequency of 1503 kHz was later replaced by the better-received 1494 kHz.

Jingles used on the station included a specially-commissioned package recorded by the singers at Pams of Dallas, who provided the jingles used by the offshore pirate radio station Wonderful Radio London in the 1960s.

Sovereign's music format was unusual in that it was quite usual to hear three records in a row by a major band or artist. Many rare and seldom heard-oldies were also played. News was broadcast at half past each hour, followed by a current Top Forty contender, which was the exception to the Solid Gold format; these records were known as 'Future Gold' records.

Radio Sovereign operated from 3 Sherland Road, Twickenham. The on-air address was announced as 'Radio Sovereign, Surbiton'. However, no broadcasts were ever made from Surbiton.

The station was taken to court twice. On the second occasion, in November 1983, John Kenning was fined £1,000 plus £100 costs. It was inferred that the next time the Department for Trade & Industry investigators returned they would seize the expensive studio gear and Kenning's treasured collection of vinyl records. Radio Sovereign therefore left the air on 2 January 1984 with a final closedown announcement from Kevin Turner.

After closing in the UK, the station moved to Camporosso, Italy, in May 1984 under the name Radio Sovereign International. The station is named "88.4 – The Rock of the Riviera".

== On-air personalities ==
Some of the DJs and presenters heard on Radio Sovereign included Crispian St. John, Paul McKenna, John Kenning, Steve Colman, Jim Lawrence, Rob Randall, Kevin Turner, Gary King, Joy Jameson, Keith York, Michael Barrington, Ron Brown, Chris Elliot, Bernie Simmons, Paul Anthony, Jerry James, Steve Rowney, Marsha Hanlon and Gavin Ford.
