= Fab 40 =

Weekly playlist by British pirate radio station Radio London

The "Fab 40" (i.e. "Fabulous Forty") was a weekly playlist of popular records used by the British "pirate" radio station "Wonderful" Radio London (also known as "Big L") which broadcast off the Essex coast from 1964 to 1967.

== Basis of the chart ==
"Fab" (short for "fabulous") was a very fashionable adjective in the mid-1960s, associated with the Beatles, who were known as the "Fab Four", and much used by such trend-setters as Cathy McGowan, who presented the weekly rock music show Ready Steady Go! on independent television.

Unlike the charts published in the Melody Maker, New Musical Express and other music papers (or, for that matter, used by the BBC or the rival pirate station Radio Caroline), the Fab 40 was not based on sales of records. Thus, although it mostly contained what was current and popular, it was often ahead of movements in the authentic charts and was subject to more dramatic fluctuations. Whereas, in the sales charts of the 1960s, many records would climb in stages and then drop gradually, a record might suddenly emerge near the top of the Fab 40 one week and disappear from it the next. Equally, there was often room for records to scale the higher echelons of the Fab 40 without entering the sales charts at all (for example, the Settlers' Nowhere Man in March 1966). As a result, a number of records that are well remembered from the mid-1960s were not, in fact, particularly successful in commercial terms.

== Fab 40 show ==
The Fab 40 was unveiled each week during a three-hour programme at lunchtime on Sunday (11 am to 2 pm), which, through such programmes as Family Favourites and Beyond Our Ken, the BBC had established as a prime time for radio listening. The show, which followed the Colgate-Palmolive Request Hour, was presented by the station's disc jockeys on a rotational basis. This format largely mirrored that of the BBC's Pick of the Pops, which Alan Freeman had presented each Sunday on the Light Programme since 1961.

The final Fab 40 show was introduced by Tommy Vance on 6 August 1967, the number one record that week being the Beach Boys' Heroes and Villains, which entered the chart in the top position (whereas, in terms of sales, it entered the British top 20 a month later and reached no higher than number eight). Radio London closed on 14 August 1967 following enactment of the Marine, &c., Broadcasting (Offences) Act 1967 that, in effect, outlawed such stations. In August 2007 the final "Fab 40" was re-presented by former Radio London disc jockey Dave Cash as part of a celebration on BBC Radio Essex to mark the fortieth anniversary of the pirates' demise. On 14 August 2022, John Peters recreated this Big L Fab 40 chart rundown for Boom Radio's day Celebrating the Pirates, 55 years after Wonderful Radio London closed, in association with Chris and Mary Payne of tribute site radiolondon.co.uk.

When the BBC opened its own "pop" station Radio 1 in September 1967, its sales-based top 30 chart was known informally for a time as the "Fun 30", no doubt in imitation of London's "Fab 40".

== Reconstructing the Fab 40 ==
Some 30–40 years after they were in use, meticulous attempts were made to reconstruct the Fab 40 charts by Radio London Ltd. These drew on surviving lists prepared between 1965 and 1967, at Radio London's offices at 17 Curzon Street in London and informal ones compiled at the time by listeners, although there were sometimes discrepancies between the "official" list and the records that were actually delivered to the ship, the MV Galaxy. Complete charts are available on the Radio London website, from 24 January 1965, five weeks after the station opened, till the final Fab 40, 6 August 1967 and are regularly updated with new information and input from featured artists. The first Fab 40 anticipated the sales chart a week later, when the Moody Blues were at number one with "Go Now".
