= Ron O'Quinn =

Ron O'Quinn is an American radio disc jockey born March 4, 1943, in McRae, Georgia.

At the age of 16, O'Quinn began his radio career at WMGA, a station in his hometown of Moultrie, Georgia, where he worked at the time of his graduation from Moultrie High School in 1961. Shortly thereafter, O'Quinn joined the Army, where he became a machine gunner as an Army Ranger. In 1963, after finishing his time in the Army, O'Quinn jumped right back into radio with a move to WVLD in Valdosta, Georgia, then on to WROD in Daytona Beach, Florida, before ending up at WLCY in Tampa, Florida, where he went by the moniker Jack E. Rabbitt. While on WLCY, O'Quinn had the highest rankings ever earned in the Tampa market, a 60% share (Arbitron, released Summer 1966), a record that still stands today. Moving on to Miami, O'Quinn went to work for WFUN, where he became known as Jack Armstrong.

In 1966, O'Quinn left WFUN to become Program Director of a new radio station, Swinging Radio England, that was located off the coast of England in the North Sea.

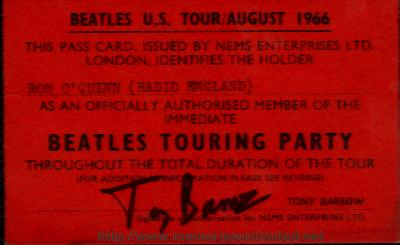
Ron's Beatles' Touring Pass

During his time at Radio England, O'Quinn accompanied The Beatles on their 1966 U.S. Tour. It is O'Quinn who coughs in the studio during the count-in to Taxman.

Upon returning to England following the tour, O'Quinn was told he had 3 weeks to get his affairs in order and return to America, unless he left the employ of Radio England, in which case he could remain (due to the British government imposing restrictions against offshore pirate radio). Knowing that he couldn't remain in the UK jobless, O'Quinn left Radio England and returned to the United States.

After returning home to America, O'Quinn worked for many top-rated stations, including a return to WFUN, WYLD in New Orleans, KYA in San Francisco & WUBE in Cincinnati, as well as being National Program Director of Urban Stations for Rounsaville Organization, an Atlanta-based company.

In 1987, after being out of radio for several years, O'Quinn started a syndicated oldies show, Rock and Roll Reunion, which was carried on 88 stations across the United States. He also hosted a weekly oldies show, Memories Unlimited, on WQZY-FM and WKKZ-FM in Georgia until 2001.

Ron is regarded as one of the "BEST ALL TIME Disc Jockeys". His style was high energy, rapid fire, and always the top rated program in his time slot. Ron is a member of the Pirate Radio Hall of Fame, and was an inaugural nominee for the Georgia Radio Hall Of Fame. On October 20, 2012, Ron was inducted into the Georgia Radio Hall of Fame as a Career Achievement Inductee.

In August 2010, Ron made his return to the radio in Europe on Big L, 1395AM, out of Holland, but directed toward the United Kingdom, with his weekly syndicated radio show "Radio England Rewind". In 2011 he started adding radio stations in the US, Canada, and all across Europe and changed the name of the weekly show to Rock 'N Roll Rewind. The show was heard by over 1,000,000 listeners each weekend, but Ron decided to call it quits and retire. His final show was the last weekend of June 2017, even though some stations around the world continue with reruns. Ron now lives in Cotacachi, Ecuador.

== Syndicated Radio Program ==
In October 2012 Ron O'Quinn returned to the airwaves (and online) with his show Ron's Rewind, which he records in his home studio.

Ron's new shows can be heard on Radio Mi Amigo International Saturdays from 10:00 till 12:00 and Sundays from 16:00 till 18:00 on 6085 kHz Shortwave and online. (CET). The landbased station features a number of DJ's from the offshore radio stations of the sixties, seventies, and eighties.
