= Wayne Harrison (footballer, born 1967) =

English footballer

Personal information
- Full name: Wayne Harrison
- Date of birth: 15 November 1967
- Place of birth: Stockport, England
- Date of death: 25 December 2013 (aged 46)
- Place of death: Stockport, England
- Height: 5 ft 8 in (1.73 m)
- Position: Striker

Senior career*
Years	Team	Apps	(Gls)
1984–1985	Oldham Athletic	6	(1)
1985–1991	Liverpool	0	(0)
1985	→ Oldham Athletic (loan)	1	(0)
1988	→ Crewe Alexandra (loan)	3	(1)
Total		10	(2)
- * Club domestic league appearances and goals

Wayne Harrison (15 November 1967 – 25 December 2013) was an English professional footballer who played as a striker.

He is most famous for his record-breaking transfer from Oldham Athletic to Liverpool, where he became the world's most expensive 17-year-old, but his time at Anfield was blighted by a succession of injuries which eventually forced him to retire aged just 23.

== Career ==
Born in Stockport, Harrison grew up a fan of Liverpool, and his heroes were Kenny Dalglish and Kevin Keegan.

After starting his career with Oldham Athletic, he later progressed to the first team, becoming Oldham's youngest ever player at the age of 16. He then made the move to Liverpool, where he was loaned out to Oldham and Crewe Alexandra, making a total of 10 appearances in the Football League.

Whilst playing for Oldham, he scored twice against Liverpool in the FA Youth Cup in December 1984, to help Oldham win. Liverpool manager Joe Fagan put in a bid, and he signed for Liverpool in January 1985 for a fee of £250,000, which made him the world's most expensive 17-year-old player at the time. Fagan, who had fended off competition from Everton, Nottingham Forest and Manchester United, described Harrison as a "special player". Liverpool scout Tom Saunders had originally spotted Harrison before he came to Fagan's attention.

His time with Liverpool was blighted by injury, including a near fatal accident in which he fell through a greenhouse and almost died due to the massive blood loss he endured. He recovered through loans to Oldham and Crewe Alexandra, to become top scorer for Liverpool reserves in the 1989–90 season, scoring 17 goals in 28 games to help the side win the Central League title.

About to break into the first team, he suffered an irreparable knee injury, which forced him to quit football immediately in 1991, and also miss his testimonial game at Boundary Park in 1992 between Oldham and Liverpool. He never made a first-team appearance for Liverpool.

== Later life and death ==
After retirement from the professional sport, Harrison played Sunday League football and worked as an HGV driver for a local brewery.

He died at his hometown's Stepping Hill Hospital on 25 December 2013 at the age of 46, after suffering from pancreatic illness.
