= Tony Brandon =

English radio presenter and comedian

Tony Brandon (born 12 December 1933, in Portland, Dorset) is an English radio presenter and comedian.

== Early career ==
Brandon first worked on television and abroad as a comedian. Following a brief spell on Radio Luxembourg in 1966 he joined pirate station Radio London.

== BBC Radio ==
Brandon joined BBC Radio 1 later in 1967, presenting editions of Midday Spin as well as deputising for other presenters. In 1970 he began his own daily show Sounds Like Tony Brandon, every weekday afternoon from 2 to 3 pm, where he remained until 1971, when he joined Radio 2. There he presented the early show, along with "Percy", a recording of birdsong, which Brandon would play at some point in the show, to indicate that Percy had "woken up".

His first outside broadcast road show was at HMS Raleigh in June 1972. Brandon also presented weekday lunchtime, teatime and afternoon shows. He went on to present a weekly show Tony Brandon Meets the Saturday People and also a comedy show for the station. He left Radio 2 in 1982.

== Theatre ==
From 1984, Brandon returned to the theatre and spent three years touring the UK and Canada in various plays. He has also performed in pantomime.

== Commercial radio ==
From the mid-1980s, Brandon was heard on various commercial radio stations across the UK, including Southern Sound, where he presented the weekday lunchtime show.

From 2001 to 2004, he was heard on Birmingham's Saga 105.7FM, where he presented his weekly Wireless Workshop show, every Sunday from 10 am to 1 pm.

== Semi-retirement ==
Following Brandon's departure from Saga 105.7, he has continued to work as a commercial voice-over actor from his own studio.
