= Graham Jackson (British conductor) =

- Born: 15 February 1967; Burnham, Buckinghamshire, England
- Died: 23 July 2012 (aged 45); Cambridge, England
- Education: Trinity College, Cambridge (BA); Royal Northern College of Music (MMus)
- Spouse: Adrienne Jackson
- Children: Four

Graham Jackson (15 February 1967 – 23 July 2012) was a British conductor.

== Early life and education ==
Born in Burnham, Buckinghamshire, Jackson learned the clarinet, piano and bassoon as a child, and served as first bassoon in the National Youth Orchestra of Great Britain. He studied at Trinity College, Cambridge from 1985 to 1988 as organ scholar, receiving a dual degree in music and mathematics. Jackson then won a scholarship to study conducting for three years at the Royal Northern College of Music in Manchester.

== Career ==
Having concluded his studies, in 1992 he joined Welsh National Opera as chorus master, répétiteur and conductor. He soon earned a reputation for his prodigious keyboard skills and his ability to conduct scores from memory.

From 2000 to 2003, Jackson was "Kapellmeister" (principal conductor) at the Theater Bremen, where he managed the new production of Shostakovich's Lady Macbeth of Mtsensk to critical acclaim. He became "Generalmusikdirektor" (Director of Music) of the Theater Krefeld and Mönchengladbach in 2003. Despite being a non-smoker, he was diagnosed in 2009 with stage 4 lung cancer. He concluded his tenure in this post in early July 2012, just over a fortnight before his death. His gave his final series of concerts starting on 5 July 2012, including a performance of Berlioz's Symphonie Fantastique.

His work in contemporary music included conducting premieres of works by François Sarhan, Charlotte Seither, Stefan Heucke and Sidney Corbett. He felt that his finest achievement was the première of Heuke's work Das Frauenorchester von Auschwitz, an opera that tells how female prisoners at the concentration camp made music together under the direction of Alma Rosé, Mahler's niece. At the time it provoked much discussion in German musical circles. He was popular with both critics and audiences alike, and was voted Conductor of the Year by critics in North Rhine-Westphalia for 2010–2011.

== Personal life ==
Jackson was married for 19 years to the artist and flautist Adrienne Jackson. The couple had four children, Oliver, Helena, Daniel and Tess. He died at home in Cambridge on 23 July 2012.

== Recordings ==
As conductor

- Anthems for the Chapel Royal of Henry Purcell. - Hamburg: BMG Ariola, (1994)
- Noah (soundtrack) Corbett, Sidney. - Berlin: Detlef Kessler, P 2004
- Essay on Shadow and Truth (soundtrack) Seither, Charlotte. Zeitklang Edition (2011)
