= Ampliphase =

Ampliphase is the brand name of an amplitude modulation system achieved by summing phase modulated carriers.

This modulation and amplifier technology family was originally marketed by RCA for AM broadcast transmitters. The Ampliphase system was not developed by RCA, but by McClatchy Broadcasting in the mid-1930s. McClatchy Broadcasting acquired the technology via patent acquisition.

The Ampliphase design was originally proposed by H. Chireix in 1935 and termed "Outphasing" by him. He sold the patent to McClatchy Broadcasting that later sold the patent to RCA. RCA turned "Outphasing" transmitters into a mass-produced product. RCA's first transmitters using this modulation system were at the 50,000 watt level but later lower power transmitters such as 10 kw and 5 kw were made.

McClatchy Broadcasting was a former group owner of AM, FM and TV stations as well as a California publisher of newspapers. McClatchy Broadcasting should not be confused with the present-day McClatchey Broadcasting LLC, a different corporate entity.

Only one known transmitter of this type is still in use. KFBK in California maintains an RCA BTA-50H (the "last gasp" of the Ampliphase concept) as an auxiliary transmitter. Radio Caroline has a working RCA BTA-50H on display aboard its radio ship Ross Revenge, however this transmitter has fallen out of use and is unlikely to be put back on the air since the Ross Revenge currently broadcasts via relay to a more efficient land-based transmitter.

== How it works ==
1. The system takes a carrier signal and splits it into two identical signals.
2. The signals are first phase shifted 135 degrees from each other (to provide a base power output with zero modulation from the transmitter).
3. Each signal is then phase modulated by the audio signal: one signal is positively phase modulated while the other is negatively phase modulated.
4. The two signals are then amplified to a desired power.
5. Finally, the two signals are summed in the final output filter stage of the transmitter.

The result is that when the signals are closer in phase, the output amplitude is larger and when the signals are more out of phase, the output is lower. A complication is the necessity for a "drive regulator", which implementation is quite simple at 10 kW or lower levels, but is more complicated at higher levels. "Drive regulation" is most effective when the instantaneous power output approaches zero.

== Development ==
The Ampliphase system was not developed by RCA, but by McClatchy Broadcasting (a former group owner of AM, FM and TV stations, also a California publisher of newspapers, not to be confused with the present-day McClatchey Broadcasting LLC).

The first Ampliphase transmitter was KFBK in Sacramento, CA (50,000 watts full-time). Later known installations were KOH in Reno, NV (5,000 watts days/1,000 watts nights).

Other McClatchy AM stations like (KBEE, Modesto, and KMJ, Fresno, both of CA) employed conventional transmitters.

Unlike most other commercial designs of AM broadcast transmitters Ampliphase units do not require expensive or large modulation transformers nor modulation reactors, thereby saving on the initial up-front cost. The down-side is the Ampliphase units require more maintenance.

The Ampliphase concept trades a lower "Capital" cost for a higher "Expense" cost. Ampliphase achieved a modest improvement in transmitter overall efficiency before other amplification and modulation schemes could replace it.

== Obsolescence ==
KFBK in California still maintains an RCA BTA-50H (the "last gasp" of the Ampliphase concept) as an auxiliary transmitter. However, KFBK's main transmitter is a solid-state Harris unit, the prototype for which was later named the DX-50. KOH has long since scrapped its home-built "outphasing" transmitter for conventional units.

In the post-WWII era very few transmitters of this type were made, except for special purpose orders that kept the transmitter design nominally commercially viable into the 1970s. With the oil crises of the 1970s and 1980s Pulse Duration and Pulse Step Modulation schemes for AM transmitters took hold at power levels at or beyond 50 kw.

Currently, the only manufacturer of AM transmitters that uses phase modulation to achieve AM is SRK Electronics. However, their design is implemented entirely in the digital domain, so avoiding the maintenance issues of the analogue Ampliphase transmitters.
