= Wonderful Radio London =

Offshore pirate-radio station

Radio London
- Radio London's transmitter ship, the MV Galaxy
- Offshore (North Sea); United Kingdom
- Broadcast area: United Kingdom, Netherlands, Belgium, France
- Frequency: 266 m / 1133–1155 kHz (AM)
- Branding: Wonderful Radio London, Big L

Programming
- Language: English
- Format: Top 40 / "Fab 40"

Ownership
- Owner: Radlon (Sales) Ltd

History
- First air date: 23 December 1964
- Last air date: 14 August 1967

Radio London, also known as Big L and Wonderful Radio London, was a top 40 (in London's case, the "Fab 40") offshore commercial station that operated from 23 December 1964 to 14 August 1967, from a ship anchored in the North Sea, three and a half miles (5.6 km) off Frinton-on-Sea, Essex, England.

The station, like other offshore radio operators, was dubbed a pirate radio station, and went off air following the introduction of the Marine, &c., Broadcasting (Offences) Act 1967 which made it illegal to supply or assist such stations except in an emergency. The station was notable for helping to launch the careers of various disc jockeys who went on to work at BBC Radio 1. Its offices were in the West End of London at 17 Curzon Street, just off Park Lane.

== Origin of the station ==
Radio London was the brainchild of Don Pierson, who lived in Eastland, Texas, United States. In a 1984 interview, Pierson said he got the idea in 1964, while reading a report in The Dallas Morning News of the start of Radio Caroline and Radio Atlanta from ships that were at that time anchored off south-east England.

Pierson said he was struck by the fact that those two offshore stations were the first and only all-day commercial radio broadcasters serving the UK. An entrepreneur, he compared the number of stations then serving the population of his native northwest Texas with the two stations serving the entire UK. He told Eric Gilder that he thought his idea would make a lot of money while bringing enjoyment to many people. Pierson caught the next night flight from Love Field in Dallas to the UK, where he chartered a small plane and flew over the two radio ships. After taking photographs, he returned to Texas determined to create a station bigger and better than either.

Radio London broadcast from the MV Galaxy, a former Second World War United States Navy minesweeper, originally named USS Density. It was fitted out for radio broadcasting in Miami, then sailed across the Atlantic to the Azores, where the antenna was erected, before final positioning off the Essex coast. The operation was overseen by one of the other investors, Tom Danaher.

Owing to a disagreement with the other investors, Pierson left the Radio London consortium. His participation ended several weeks before the station went on air, although he kept a small shareholding.

== Broadcasting staff ==
The disc jockeys included Chuck Blair, Tony Blackburn, Pete Brady, Tony Brandon, Dave Cash (who also teamed up to present a popular Kenny and Cash Show), Ian Damon, Chris Denning, Dave Dennis, Pete Drummond, John Edward, Kenny Everett (co-host of the Kenny and Cash Show, and ultimately fired for continual on-air criticism of the religious programme, The World Tomorrow), Graham Gill, Bill Hearne, Duncan Johnson, Paul Kaye (who became the main news reader), Lorne King, "Marshall" Mike Lennox, John Peel (see The Perfumed Garden), Earl Richmond, Mark Roman, John Sedd, Keith Skues, Ed Stewart, Norman St. John, Tommy Vance (who came to the station via Radio Caroline South and had been on KHJ Los Angeles), Richard Warner, Willy Walker, Alan West, Tony Windsor (who had begun his offshore career with Radio Atlanta) and John Yorke.

In August 1966, the Beatles began their last US concert tour. After the storm John Lennon's "more popular than Jesus" comment caused in the US, the group's reception was a cause for speculation – and the Beatles' management arranged for British journalists to accompany them. Radio London's Kenny Everett (a Liverpudlian), Caroline's Jerry Leighton, and Swinging Radio England's Ron O'Quinn were invited. Because the UK Post Office – at that time the country's monopoly telephone service provider – had cut ship-to-shore communication with pirate vessels, Everett had to call a number on land.

Paul Kaye would go ashore, take the call in Harwich and tape the conversation before heading back to the ship, where the recording was edited and music inserted to make a 30-minute programme, sponsored by Bassett's, whose Jelly Babies were allegedly the Beatles' favourite. The shows went out each evening at 7.30 for 40 days of the tour. In 1967, Radio London got an eight-day UK exclusive on the Sgt. Pepper's Lonely Hearts Club Band, playing it first on 12 May 1967. The album was in the shops on 1 June 1967, but Everett had left the station on 21 March that year.

== Advertising sales ==
A Cadillac car dealer in Abilene, Texas, who became one of the investors associated with Pierson, nominated Philip Birch, a J. Walter Thompson account director who had relocated from JWT's offices in the US to their offices in London. Birch became managing director, responsible for the entire management of Radio London and its sales company, Radlon (Sales). Birch was largely responsible for the station's success, tailoring the American-style format to a British audience.

The cost of the station was covered by local and national advertising and the half-hour religious commentary, The World Tomorrow, presented by Herbert W. Armstrong or his son, Garner Ted Armstrong. The Armstrongs' Worldwide Church of God sponsored the station with £50,000 a year. The World Tomorrow aired at 7pm, outside prime hours.

British authorities would not register a British sales company called "Radio London" because the name was "too similar" to an existing company, Commercial Radio (London), so it was registered as "Radlon (Sales) Ltd". It was owned by Philip Birch and was the name on the air for advertising sales. The investors were in Texas and used different names for interlocking companies outside the UK and USA to disguise their interests, primarily for tax reasons.

After closure of Big L, Birch became the founding managing director of Piccadilly Radio, which was awarded the UK licence for Manchester in 1973 and became one of Britain's most successful radio stations. He also founded Air Services, selling national advertising for stations throughout the UK. He continued as CEO of Piccadilly Radio and chairman of Air Services until his retirement in January 1984.

== Station name ==
The station was to have been called Radio KLIF London, using recorded programmes from the Dallas AM radio station, KLIF 1190. When it was decided that the sound should be live and geared towards a British audience and culture, Pierson hired Ben Toney as Programme Director. Philip Birch was appointed CEO in charge of the radio station and advertising sales. Birch suggested calling the station Radio Galaxy, in anticipation of its star-making ability.

As a compromise, the minesweeper was renamed MV Galaxy while the station itself became Radio London. However, the PAMS jingles brought a refinement of the name so that it was known as Wonderful Radio London and Big L; just as KLIF in Dallas called its hometown Big D.

== Technical facilities ==
Virtually all DJ programmes originated live from a studio located in the hold at the rear of the ship. The original studio was installed by RCA while the ship was being fitted out in Miami, but the ship's metal bulkheads presented problems with acoustics and soundproofing. That was rectified by lining the walls with mattresses and blankets from the crew's bunk beds, although that meant no-one could sleep during the daytime. In early 1966, two new studios were constructed (also below the water-line), with proper acoustics and a more ergonomic layout - the main on-air/DJ studio had a modern sound/mixing board, and a smaller one for the hourly news bulletins, production (of commercials, etc.) and as backup.

Radio London's transmitter was housed in a large purpose-built steel shed on the rear deck, because it was too large to fit in the hold. The US-manufactured RCA Ampliphase transmitter was rated at 50,000 watts (50 kW). An on-air slogan ran 'Your 50,000-watt Tower of Power', although initially it operated at 17 kW. In contrast, Radio Caroline, its main rival, operated with a Continental Electronics 10 kW transmitter. In 1966, Caroline South upgraded to a 50 kW Continental transmitter and, for a time, Radio London retaliated by pretending it had increased its power to 75 kW.

The station's antenna was a vertical-guyed tubular steel mast aft of the bridge. Radio London's publicity claimed the mast was 212 ft (65 m) high, but later calculations from photographs indicated that it was approximately 170 ft (52 m), . Critically, the positioning of the antenna was at the ship's centre of gravity, as no cement ballast was used in the ship's hull to counteract movement caused by such a tall and heavy mast on a floating vessel.

Although the wavelength was announced as "266 metres", the station experimented with frequencies between 1133 kHz, 1115 kHz and 1155 kHz, and tended to suffer night-time heterodyne interference from stations in Zagreb and elsewhere. In October 1966, a number of test transmissions took place on 1079 kHz, announced as "277 metres", using a 10 kW standby transmitter, but it was decided not to change frequency on a permanent basis. When Radio 270 off Scarborough UK started transmissions in June 1966 on 1115 kHz, it interfered with Big L Radio London for about 5 days, before Radio London finally made the big step from 1115 kHz to its permanent and final 1155 kHz that had the typical 4 and 5 kHz heterodynes caused by 1151 kHz and 1160 kHz. In early 1966, Radio London briefly hopped from 1133 kHz to 1115 kHz due to its increased strong signal, causing interference to Radio Zagreb on 1133 kHz. In October 1966, QSL cards reported Radio London having been received in faraway places such as Illinois, USA, Kimberley and Riversdale, South Africa due to favourable atmospheric propagation conditions and the 1155 kHz split-frequency Radio London used.

After Radio Caroline South increased power and changed its frequency to 1187 kHz in the spring of 1966, it caused some interference to Radio London on 1133 kHz. That seems to have been caused by resonance between the two ships' antenna masts, and possibly by the Galaxy's steel hull.

== Station closedown ==
At midnight on 14 August 1967, the Marine, &c., Broadcasting (Offences) Act 1967 came into effect in the United Kingdom. It created a criminal offence of supplying music, commentary, advertising, fuel, food, water or other assistance except for life-saving, to any ship, offshore structure such as a former WWII fort, or flying platform such as an aircraft used for broadcasting without a licence from the regulatory authority in the UK. Despite initial plans to the contrary, Radio London decided not to defy the law, and closed before the Act came into effect.

It was decided to close at 3pm on 14 August 1967, partly to guarantee a large audience, as well as to enable the ship's DJs and other staff to return to shore and board a train to London. A one-hour recorded show was broadcast from 2pm to allow staff to get ready to leave. The time also described an "L" shape of the hands on a clock face, but whether that was a real consideration is unknown.

Their Final Hour, as the programme was called, had recorded greetings of farewell and remembrance from recording stars; included were the voices of Mick Jagger, Cliff Richard, Ringo Starr and Dusty Springfield. The 2:30 news bulletin, read by Paul Kaye, was the final live segment on the station. Birch thanked DJs and staff and others involved throughout the station's life, as well as politicians and others who fought for the station – and its 12 million listeners in the United Kingdom and four million in the Netherlands, Belgium and France'. That was followed by the last record, "A Day in the Life" by the Beatles, then Paul Kaye's final announcement: "Big L time is three o'clock, and Radio London is now closing down". Radio London's theme tune, the "PAMS Sonowaltz", popularly called Big Lil, was played before the transmitter was switched off by engineer Russell Tollerfield, just after 3pm.

Just after Radio London closed down, Robbie Dale on Radio Caroline South (previously Radio Atlanta) broadcast a brief tribute to the station, thanked its staff and DJs, and held a minute's silence. Most offshore stations had already left the air. Radio Scotland and Radio 270 closed at midnight. Radio Caroline South said it and Radio Caroline North (the original Caroline) would continue. Owner Ronan O'Rahilly said they were defending the principle of free broadcasting, rather than being mere business assets. Caroline's offshore broadcasts continued on and off until 1990, after which the station pursued legal means of broadcasting.

Radio London staff arriving at London's Liverpool Street station from Harwich were greeted by large numbers of fans, some wearing black armbands and carrying placards with slogans such as "Freedom went with Radio London". They tried to storm the platform, leading to minor scuffles with police.

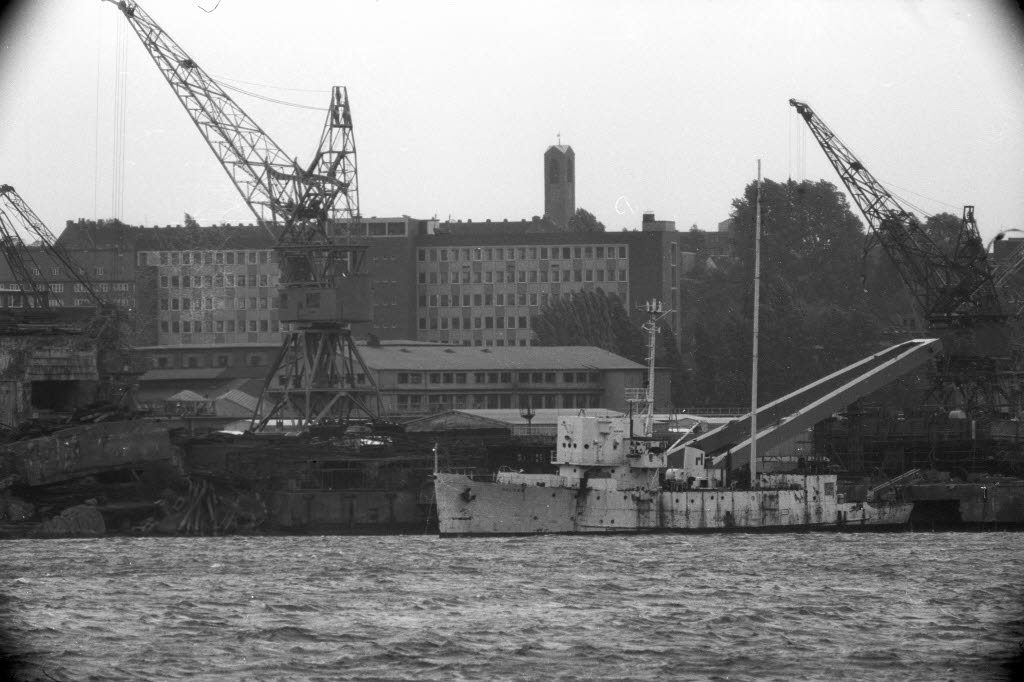
MV Galaxy in Kiel harbour, 1975

The MV Galaxy sailed initially to Hamburg, West Germany, where Erwin Meister and Edwin Bollier tried to buy it for what became Radio Nordsee International. When the deal fell through, Meister and Bollier looked for another ship. In 1979, the Galaxy, with its 170 ft mast still erect, was sunk in Kiel harbour as an artificial reef; but, in 1986, concerns about pollution from the ship's fuel tanks resulted in it being brought ashore and salvaged.

== Further history ==
When his second radio ship closed and the vessel returned to Miami, Florida, in 1967, Don Pierson attempted to restart Wonderful Radio London from there. His plan was to interest investors in restarting Radio London off-shore from New York. When that failed, he began a venture involving yet another ship which would restart Wonderful Radio London off San Diego, California. That, too, sank.

In 1982, Pierson helped promote a syndicated Wonderful Radio London Show, first aired over KVMX, a station he owned in Eastland, Texas. He promoted the show at the National Association of Broadcasters convention in Las Vegas, Nevada. When Ben Toney, the original offshore Radio London programme director, became involved, the show was on KXOL in Fort Worth, Texas, and as a daily show aired over 250,000-watt XERF in Mexico. Plans were made to extend the early morning airtime of XERF into Wonderful Radio London as a full service station, and to send a new ship to the UK as Wonderful Radio London International' (WRLI), to replicate Radio London's success of the 1960s. However, those further plans failed to materialise beyond their syndication stage.

Pierson died in 1996.

== Swinging Radio England and Britain Radio ==
As a result of Radio London, Pierson created Swinging Radio England and Britain Radio on another ship (the MV Olga Patricia; later renamed MV Laissez Faire) in 1965. They did not get to air until 1966 when their vessel anchored close to the MV Galaxy. The twin stations were not commercially successful due to their brash American radio style, technical problems, and mismanagement. Dutch station Radio Dolfijn replaced Radio England in November 1966. Radio 355 replaced Britain Radio and Dolfijn gave way to Radio Twee Twee Zeven (227) in early 1967.

== In pop culture ==
- Wonderful Radio London is referred to (and some of its jingles used) on The Who's album The Who Sell Out and their film Quadrophenia.
- The station features in the 1966 film Dateline Diamonds, which includes a few external shots of the Galaxy and a fanciful studio re-creation of its interior.
- Radio London was parodied in the film The Boat That Rocked.

== See also ==
- The Perfumed Garden
- Radio Sovereign
- See Radio London (disambiguation) for other stations that have used this name or its variations in whole or in part. Several stations are listed.
