= John Crosse (announcer) =

British radio DJ and announcer (1941–2025)

John Crosse (February 1941 – January 2025) was a British radio DJ, presenter and continuity announcer, known for being one of the voices of the Yorkshire Television region of Independent Television for nearly 30 years.

== Life and career ==
Crosse was born in Ballymena, Northern Ireland in February 1941. He began his broadcasting career on pirate station Radio London in the 1960s (where he used the pseudonym John Sedd). He then moved to work for sales company Radiovision, which sold airtime for a couple of pirate radio stations. Later, he read the news on BBC Radio 4, and then joined Southern Television for a short stint as continuity announcer for the channel.

In the early 1970s, he joined Yorkshire Television where he was noted for his authoritative RP accent, shared by a number of his colleagues at YTV, such as Redvers Kyle; the company's presentation was much more similar to BBC Television (out-of-vision announcers with RP accents) than that of other ITV companies at the same time, some of which used friendlier in-vision announcers.

Along with the rest of the announcing team at YTV, Crosse also voiced trailers produced by the company's promotions department for the ITV network, and from 1996 to 1998, he was also heard announcing for Tyne Tees Television. He also narrated the second series of the long-running schools history drama How We Used to Live.

He worked on Yorkshire TV until he retired in November 1998. Crosse later resided in the United States, and died in January 2025, at the age of 83.
