= USS Density =

Minesweeper of the United States Navy

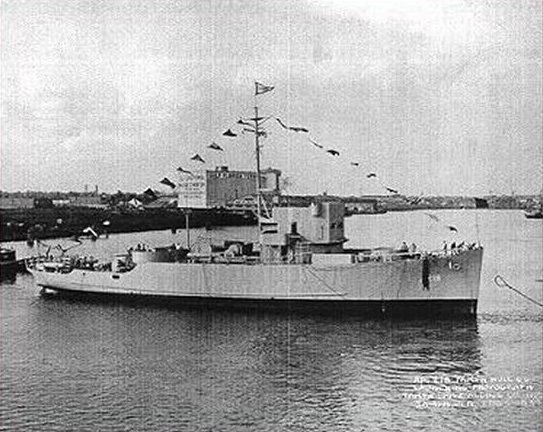
- The USS Density (AM-218) following its launch

History

United States
- Name: USS Density
- Builder: Tampa Shipbuilding Company
- Laid down: 21 March 1943
- Launched: 6 February 1944
- Commissioned: 15 June 1944
- Decommissioned: 3 March 1947
- Reclassified: MSF-218, 7 February 1955
- Identification: IMO number: 6421593
- Fate: Sold 1955 into merchant service; Scrapped 1986

General characteristics
- Class & type: Admirable-class minesweeper
- Displacement: 650 tons
- Length: 184 ft 6 in (56.24 m)
- Beam: 33 ft (10 m)
- Draft: 9 ft 9 in (2.97 m)
- Propulsion: 2 × ALCO 539 diesel engines, 1,710 shp (1.3 MW); Farrel-Birmingham single reduction gear; 2 shafts
- Speed: 14.8 knots (27.4 km/h)
- Complement: 104
- Armament: 1 × 3"/50 caliber gun DP; 2 × twin Bofors 40 mm guns; 1 × Hedgehog anti-submarine mortar; 2 × Depth charge tracks

Service record
- Part of: U.S. Pacific Fleet (1944–1947)
- Operations: Battle of Okinawa
- Awards: 3 battle stars

USS Density (AM-218) was an Admirable-class minesweeper built for the U.S. Navy during World War II in the Pacific Ocean. She was built to clear minefields in offshore waters.

She was launched on 6 February 1944 by Tampa Shipbuilding in Tampa, Florida. Sponsored by Miss M. Farmwald, she was commissioned on 15 June 1944. On 7 February 1955, she was reclassified to MSF-218.

The vessel was later renamed MV Galaxy and was home to the British offshore pirate radio station Radio London.

== World War II Pacific Ocean operations ==
On 23 September 1944, Density arrived at San Diego, California. She served as a training ship for the Small Craft Training Center at Terminal Island. On 2 February 1945, she sailed for Pearl Harbor and Ulithi.

Density sortied from Ulithi on 19 March 1945 to sweep mines in preparation for the invasion of Okinawa on 1 April. She patrolled off Okinawa for its capture and occupation, fighting against several suicide attacks. On 6 April she shot down several of the kamikaze force, which struck the Fleet. Then, she assisted the USS Rodman (DMS-21), picking up 16 survivors and towing her to Kerama Retto.

She destroyed an enemy attacker on 22 April. Although it only cleared her bridge by 10 feet (3 m), she rescued three survivors from the stricken USS Isherwood (DD-520) and resumed her patrol. Five days later, she downed an enemy plane and recovered the body of an enemy officer, obtaining valuable intelligence material including a secret code book and photographs. On 4 May, she sank an enemy suicide boat while sweeping mines off Naha.

Density sailed from Okinawa on 4 July to join a group of minesweepers supporting the 3rd Fleet strikes against the Japanese homeland. From 9 August to 28 August she was in San Pedro Bay, Leyte, for brief overhaul, and on 8 September put out from Okinawa to sweep mines in Japanese waters. She remained in the Far East on occupation duty until 20 November when she sailed for the U.S. West Coast, arriving at San Diego, California, 19 December.

== Awards ==
Density received three battle stars for World War II service.

== Post-War decommissioning ==
On 29 January 1946 she arrived at Galveston, Texas, to provide services to the reserve fleet at Orange, Texas, and was placed in commission in reserve 14 May 1946. Density was decommissioned there 3 March 1947.

In February 1955 Density was sold by the U.S. Navy to be used as a Greek cargo ship and renamed MV Manoula. By 1964 she was impounded in Miami, Florida, for non-payment of harbour dues. She was bought in September 1964 and renamed MV Galaxy. She had a 50-kilowatt RCA ampliphase transmitter installed and an approximately 150-foot (50 m) antenna mast erected behind the funnel (though a height of 212 ft [65 m] was claimed for publicity purposes). She set sail from Miami on 22 October 1964 for England via Puerto Rico and Madeira. The ship arrived in the Thames Estuary on 19 November 1964. Radio Caroline's owner Ronan O'Rahilly warned Radio London that this anchorage might fall within British territorial waters. They responded by moving the ship to a position four-and-a-half miles from Walton-on-the-Naze, Essex, close to Radio Caroline South's ship MV Mi Amigo. Radio London later regularly advertised this position on air as 51° 47.09" N, 01° 20.55" E.

She started broadcasting as Radio London, an offshore commercial station, on 23 December 1964, gaining an estimated 8.8 million listeners aged over 18 in the United Kingdom by 1966. She continued to broadcast until 14 August 1967 when the British Government enacted the Marine Offences Act prohibiting British nationals from working for the station or supplying it. Radio Caroline, operating from two ships at separate locations, was the only offshore station to defy the ban.

On 19 August she sailed to Hamburg. After Radio Caroline's ships were seized over unpaid debts the Galaxy was considered as a replacement, but was too expensive. An attempt by Erwin Meister and Edwin Bollier to buy the ship as a going concern also fell through, and they set about equipping another two ships, the later of which broadcast as Radio North Sea International.

The Galaxy remained in Hamburg until 1970 when she was sold for scrap. She remained in Hamburg until 1975 when she was moved to the shipyard and harbour of Howaldswerke-Deutsche Werft at Kiel. On 20 April 1979 she sank at its mooring there and stayed on the bottom until August 1986 when a conservation lobby persuaded the authorities to raise her due to concerns about pollution from fuel leaks. She was raised and moved to dry land where she was scrapped.
