= The Perfumed Garden (radio show) =

The Perfumed Garden was a late-night radio programme hosted by John Peel on Radio London between March and August 1967. On that pirate radio station, Peel's show was a marked departure from its other Top 40 radio programmes by playing psychedelic rock, blues, and progressive rock, interspersed with poetry and Peel's philosophical musings. Although The Perfumed Garden was short-lived, its unusual format earned it a devoted audience.

== History ==
Returning to London in 1967 after seven years in the U.S., John Peel found work at Radio London, a pirate station, and volunteered for the midnight to 2 a.m. slot. Peel played albums by groups that his listeners were unfamiliar with, forgoing the scheduled ads, news, and weather reports to provide uninterrupted music. The focus of The Perfumed Garden was music, interspersed with spoken interludes in which Peel recited poetry, talked about letters from listeners, discussed Tolkien, and read extracts from Winnie-the-Pooh. The approach that Peel took on Perfumed Garden was formed by his experience at a California FM radio station that focused on album-oriented rock.

The Perfumed Garden was an anomaly for the Top 40 Radio London. Peel was able to play what he wanted because his programme aired when the managing director was asleep. On the show, Peel would say "Wander through in our midst. Pick out a flower from the perfumed garden and plant it somewhere in your mind."

Radio London producers objected to his approach until they saw the ratings and The Perfumed Garden began getting positive press coverage. Brian Epstein, manager of the Beatles, congratulated Radio London for airing The Perfumed Garden. Radio London's daytime programmes had larger audiences, but more of Perfumed Garden's listeners engaged with the station by writing letters.

The show was one of the first on British radio to play psychedelic music. It was described as "a kind of audio bulletin board for the counter-culture and all the self-indulgent juxtapositions contained therein". Music frequently played on The Perfumed Garden included Frank Zappa, Captain Beefheart, Tim Buckley, Country Joe and the Fish, the Seeds, the Velvet Underground, the Blues Project, the Incredible String Band, Pink Floyd, the Liverpool Scene, Donovan, the Byrds, Simon and Garfunkel, and the Beatles. Peel and the station's studio engineer recorded themselves speaking backwards and then played the tape loops on The Perfumed Garden. Marc Bolan was a frequent guest on The Perfumed Garden, as was Tommy Vance. When Sgt. Pepper's Lonely Hearts Club Band was released in 1967, Peel played the complete album on his show without speaking.

The Perfumed Garden's final show was an all-night edition. Ninety songs were played during the final five-and-a-half hour show, and included Peel reading two stories about Winnie-the-Pooh.

The Perfumed Garden ended on 14 August 1967 after the Marine, &c., Broadcasting (Offences) Act 1967 outlawed pirate radio broadcasting. Peel went on to work at BBC Radio 1.

== Legacy ==
The Guardian described the show as a "freewheeling mix of poetry, philosophy, astrology, politics, and left-field music". In a tribute upon Peel's death in 2004, BBC presenter Bob Harris said the show was unlike any other in its format.

Broadcasting "…in my stoned solitude from the middle of the North Sea …" John Peel suddenly arrived in my life with a mixture of records, poetry, letters and conversation. The format was diverse, the content an absolute revelation. The show was called The Perfumed Garden. Even the name was exotic. I could hardly believe what I was hearing. It was instantly clear to me that this was a programme that was stepping way outside of the usual boundaries of playlists and format. The airwaves literally crackled with the sounds of a new generation of music…Captain Beefheart, Quicksilver Messenger Service, Love, the Doors, the Incredible String Band. Whoever this person was, I wanted to be him. I wanted to press a button and be there in that studio, finding this amazing stuff, getting these incredible letters from people who were feeling the same way as me and broadcasting it all for as many people as would listen. At that moment I knew that this was my way forward and that I had to stick by this feeling. That it really was possible to go on air, go out on a limb and just play the music you really loved, with no compromise.

Robert Chapman, writing about pirate radio in his book, Selling the Sixties, said:

John Peel's Perfumed Garden has acquired a legendary aura out of all proportion to the brevity of its existence. The show which is rightly credited with having introduced the British radio audience to the underground had a life span of approximately three months. [...] Its colossal legacy therefore derives from little more than 100 hours of airtime, but it was the innovative way in which this airtime was utilized which made the programme such an influential force.

== Tribute broadcast ==
In 2006, BBC Radio 6 Music played reconstructed recordings of The Perfumed Garden's final show. A reviewer compared it to Late Junction and wrote "[Peel] sounded not only as though he'd just taken several hits on the world's biggest bong, but was reasonably confident that all of his listeners had as well."
