= MV Caroline =

Danish passenger ferry later used as UK pirate radio ship

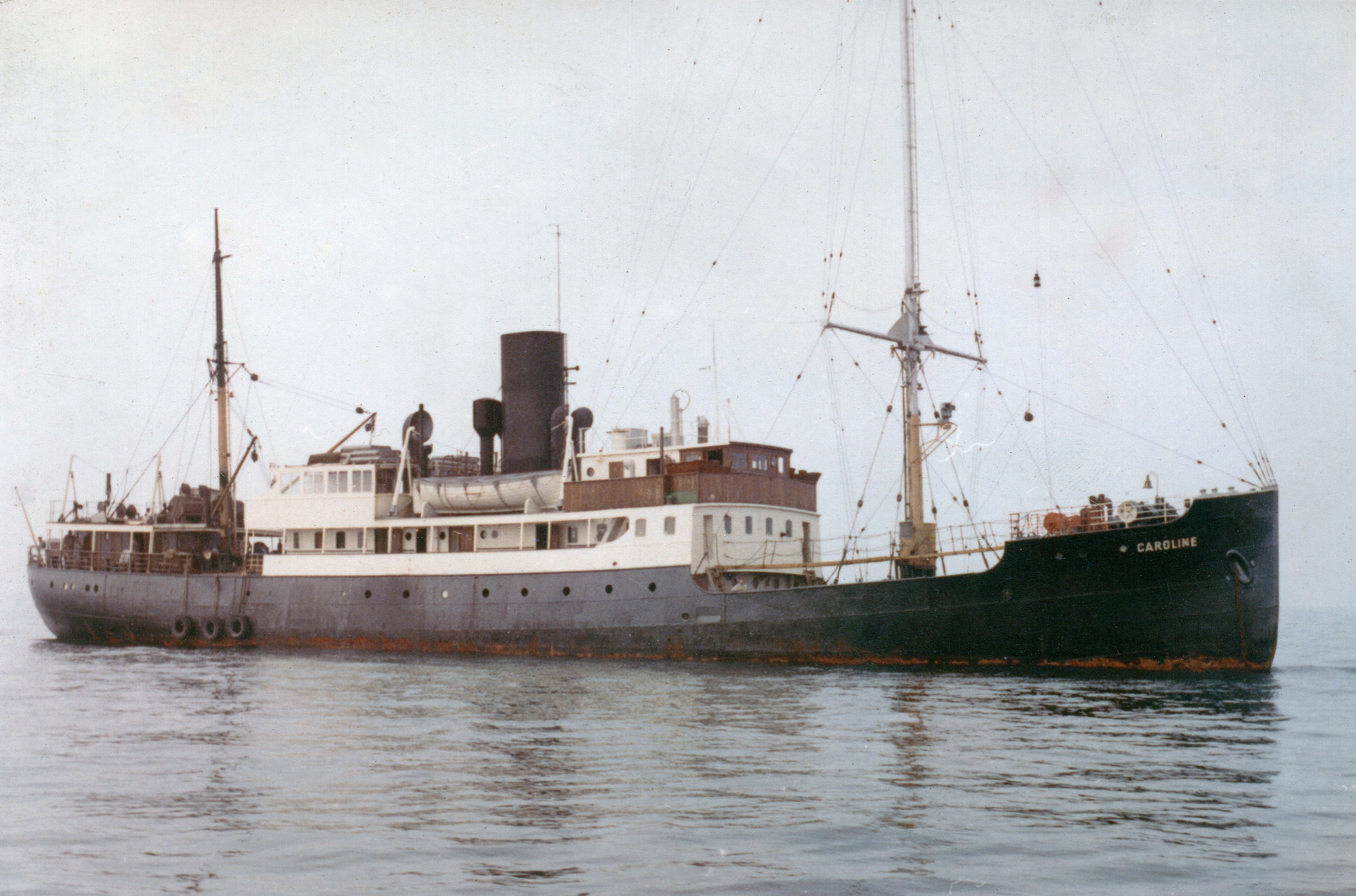
- MV Caroline c. 1965

History
- Name: Fredericia (1930–1964); Caroline (1964–1980)
- Owner: DFDS Seaways (1930–1964); Planet Productions (1964–1972)
- Operator: DFDS Seaways (1930–1963); Project Atlanta (1962–1964); Radio Caroline (1964–1968)
- Port of registry: Denmark (1930–1964); Panama City (1961–1964)
- Builder: Frederikshavns V & F A/S, Frederikshaven
- Launched: 1930
- In service: May 1930
- Out of service: August 1963
- Fate: Sold for scrap on 29 May 1972

General characteristics
- Class & type: Passenger ferry
- Tonnage: 763 GRT
- Length: 188 ft (57.30 m)

MV Caroline was a passenger ferry originally operated by DFDS Seaways as MV Fredericia which later gained international recognition as an offshore pirate radio station. She was built for and operated by DFDS Seaways serving various routes to and from Copenhagen. During World War II, she was laid up between 1941 and 1943.

== History ==
In December 1963 Fredericia was sold to Cross Channel Container Services Limited, Greenore, County Louth, Ireland. This was a cover company owned by the Irish entrepreneur Ronan O'Rahilly. Having purchased the vessel, her new owners claimed that she would be used in service between the UK and Ireland under the name Iseult. However, in reality, she had been bought for conversion to a floating pirate radio station. The conversion was undertaken at Greenore Harbour, following which she was renamed Caroline in 1964 with her port of registry changed to Panama.

The Caroline departed Greenore on 23 March 1964, to a supposed destination in Spain. She passed Land's End on 25 March, at which time she altered course and made passage through the English Channel and entered the North Sea where she anchored off Felixstowe. Radio Caroline began test transmissions on 27 March 1964 at 6:00 pm GMT; at 10:00 pm, and at 11:55 pm on 201 metres (1495 kHz). On 28 March, Radio Caroline began regular broadcasting at noon on 1520 kHz (announced as 199 metres in the medium wave band) with the opening conducted by Simon Dee.

On 2 July 1964, Radio Atlanta and Radio Caroline's companies, Project Atlanta and Planet Productions, announced the stations were to merge and operate an expanded service as Radio Caroline. Consequently, Radio Atlanta closed at 8 p.m. BST that same day. It was renamed Radio Caroline South with the MV Mi Amigo remaining off Frinton-on-Sea, while Caroline would relocate from her position and broadcast as Radio Caroline North. Following the consolidation between the two companies, Caroline weighed anchor and sailed from Felixstowe en route to the Isle of Man, broadcasting as she went. The only broadcast staff on board were Tom Lodge and Jerry Leighton.

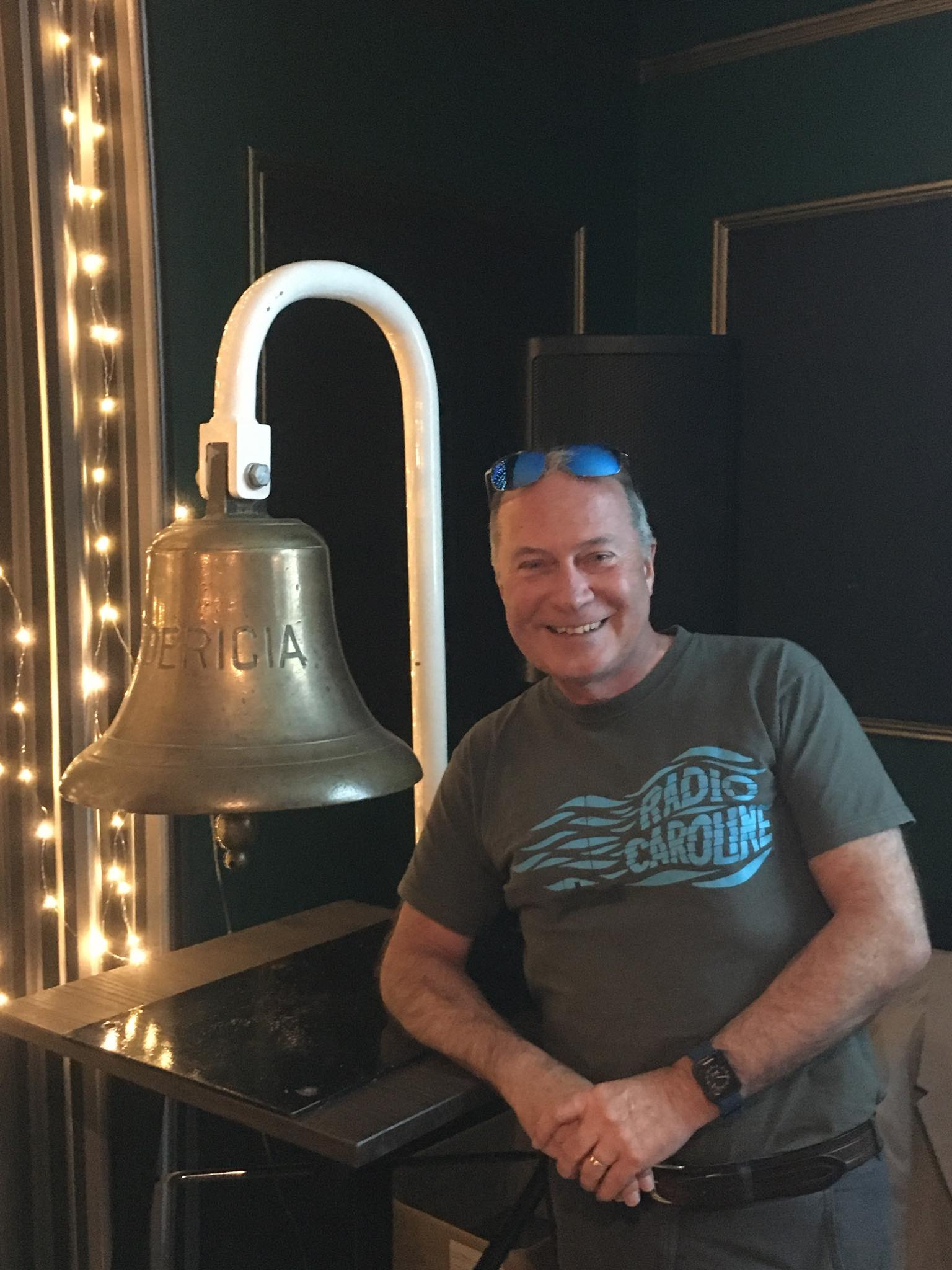
The Radio Caroline Bell. Radio Caroline DJ Chris Pearson pictured with the original ship's bell from the Fredericia (Caroline) displayed as part of the station's 60th anniversary lecture, August 2024

Caroline took up station at her new anchorage situated on the southern tip of the Bahama Bank, Ramsey Bay, on 6 July 1964, at a position formerly occupied by the Bahama Bank Lightship. In these strategic locations the two Caroline stations were now able to cover most of the British Isles. Caroline served as a radio ship until 1968, until she was impounded on the Bahama Bank as a consequence of monies owed in the region of £70,000. Her anchor chain was cut and she was taken under tow by the Dutch tug Titan. Caroline was brought to Amsterdam where she was laid up until being sold for scrap at auction in May 1972.

The scrapping of the vessel took a number of years and was not completed until 1980. However, the original ship's bell from Fredericia was saved, being on display for many years at the Viking Longhouse, Peel, Isle of Man. Although the ship's bell remains in private ownership, it was displayed at the Radio Caroline 60th Anniversary Lecture at the Mitre Hotel, Ramsey, Isle of Man, in August 2024.

== Sources ==
- Clark, Ray (2014). Radio Caroline: The True Story of the Boat That Rocked. History Press. ISBN 9780752498874.
- Harris, Paul (1977). Broadcasting From The High Seas. Paul Harris Publishing Edinburgh. ISBN 0-904505-07-3.
- Wint, Andy (2008). Manx Giant From The Wonderful Isle of Man: The Story of Radio Caroline North 1964 - 1968. Chesterfield Publications. ISBN 978-0-9560139-0-3.
