= MV Magda Maria =

Magda Maria was the name of two ships used by pirate radio stations.

- MV Magda Maria (1921), used by Radio Nord
- MV Magda Maria (1957), used by Radio Paradijs
