= MV Mi Amigo =

German cargo schooner launched in 1921

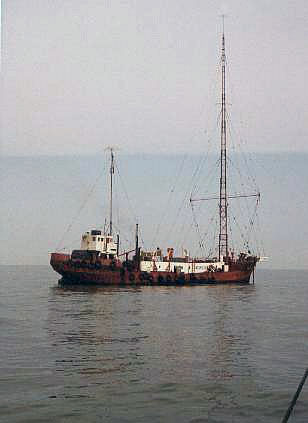
- Mi Amigo c. 1974

History
- Name: Margarethe (1921–1927); Olga (1927–1959); Bon Jour (1959–1961); Magda Maria (1961–1962); Mi Amigo (1962–1980)
- Owner: Ernst Simon AG (1921–1927); Heinrich Koppelmann (1927–1941); Kriegsmarine (1941–1944); Olga Koppelmann (1944–1959); Rosebud Shipping (1959–1972); Vermaat & van Dam (1972–1980)
- Operator: Ernst Simon AG (1921–1927); Heinrich Koppelmann (1927–1941); Kriegsmarine (1941–1944); Olga Koppelmann (1944–1959); Radio Nord (1959–1962); Project Atlanta (1962–1964); Radio Caroline (1964–1980)
- Port of registry: (Weimar Republic) Germany (1921–1933); (Nazi Germany) Hamburg (1933–1941); (Nazi Germany) Kriegsmarine (1941–1944); (Nazi Germany) Hamburg (1944–1946); (Allied-occupied Germany) Hamburg (1946–1949); (West Germany) Hamburg (1949–1959); Nicaragua (1959–1961); Panama City (1961–1964); Netherlands (1964–1980)
- Builder: Deutsche Werke
- Launched: 1921
- Commissioned: 5 June 1941
- Decommissioned: 18 November 1943
- Identification: IMO number: 5412595; Code Letters RBGF (1927–1933); Code Letters DJHY (1933–1959)
- Fate: Sank, 20 March 1980

General characteristics
- Class & type: Coaster
- Tonnage: 159 GRT (1921–1936); 197 GRT (1936–1953); 97 NRT (1921–1936); 96 NRT (1936–1953)
- Length: 96 ft 8 in (29.46 m) (1921–1936); 111 ft 3 in (33.91 m) (1936–1953); 133 feet 9 inches (40.77 m) (1953–1980)
- Beam: 23 ft 1 in (7.04 m)
- Depth: 9 ft 5 in (2.87 m)
- Propulsion: Steam engine (1921–1928); 4-cylinder 4SCSA diesel engine (1928–1936); 6-cylinder 4SCSA diesel engine (1936–1980)
- Sail plan: Schooner (1921–1959)
- Speed: 8 knots (15 km/h)

Mi Amigo (Spanish: My Friend) was originally a three-masted cargo schooner, that later gained international recognition as an offshore radio station. She was built as the schooner Margarethe for German owners. A sale in 1927 saw her renamed Olga and she was lengthened in 1936. During the Second World War, she was requisitioned by the Kriegsmarine and served as an auxiliary ship between 1941 and 1943. In 1953, the ship was again lengthened to 133 feet 9 inches (40.77 m). In 1959, she was sold for conversion to a floating radio station and was renamed Bon Jour. Subsequently, she was renamed Magda Maria in 1961 and Mi Amigo in 1962. She served, intermittently, as a radio ship, until 1980, when she sank in a gale.

== History ==
=== Margarethe ===
The ship was built as a three-masted auxiliary schooner SS Margarethe by Deutsche Werke, Kiel, Germany in 1921, for Ernst Simon A.G. As constructed she was 96 feet 8 inches (29.46 m) long, with a beam of 23 feet 1 inch (7.04 m) and a depth of 9 feet 5 inches (2.87 m). She was assessed at 129 GRT, 129 NRT. Her port of registry was Hamburg, Germany.

Simon sailed the boat around various Baltic ports carrying general cargo. She was sold to Heinrich Koppelmann in 1927.

=== Olga ===
Koppelmann renamed her Olga after his wife. In 1928, she was strengthened and a four-cylinder engine installed. The engine was built by Motorenfabriek Deutz AG., Köln. It had four cylinders of 19.2 centimetres (7 9/16 in) diameter by 31 centimetres (12 3/8 in) stroke. The tonnage increased to 159 GRT, 97 NRT. One of her wooden masts was replaced by a steel mast. Olga had Hamburg as her port of registry. She was allocated the Code Letters RBGF.

In 1936, Olga was lengthened and a new Klockner-Humboldt diesel engine fitted. It had six cylinders of 22.1 centimetres (8 11/16 in) diameter by 36.0 centimetres (14 3/16 in) stroke) (82.1 L or 5,011 cubic inches), and the length of the boat was increased to 111 feet 3 inches (33.91 m), by adding a new centre section. On 5 June 1941, Olga was requisitioned by the Kriegsmarine. She served as an auxiliary ship based at Putlos.

On 18 November 1943, Olga was decommissioned and then refitted before being returned to her owner. She appears to have been de-rigged at this time, as shown by contemporary photographs. As Heinrich Koppelmann had died, ownership passed to his widow. In 1951, Olga was again lengthened.

She was sold in 1959, her new owners planned to convert her into a floating radio station. The work was carried out by Norderwerft, Hamburg, Olga arrived at Norderwerft's shipyard on 31 May 1960. Her 9,570-cubic-foot (271 m^{3}) cargo hold was converted into studios. It was originally planned to install two 125-foot-tall (38 m) radio masts, but only one was installed. The ship was renamed Bon Jour about this time and she was reflagged to Nicaragua.

=== Bon Jour ===
On 10 August 1960, Norderwerft received a letter informing them that it was illegal to install, repair or operate a radio station without government permission, under a law passed in 1930. Bon Jour was then sailed to Langelinie, Denmark where the mast was installed as were two 10 kW transmitters which were manufactured by Continental Electronics, Dallas, Texas. The transmitters were flown in from the United States as components and assembled in Copenhagen.

On 20 December 1960, Bon Jour departed Copenhagen bound for Stockholm, Sweden. During the voyage, some of the mast stays worked loose and the ship was anchored off Gotska Sandön whilst the mast was made secure. On 23 December, Bon Jour ran into a storm. The fishing vessel Danette located her the next day and on 25 December the crew abandoned Bon Jour as they feared the mast would collapse. They were taken to Sandhamn by pilot boat. On 26 December, the salvage tug Neptune took the crew back to Bon Jour. The next day, Neptune towed Bon Jour to Sandhamn. It was suggested that the ship should be taken to Lidingö for repairs, but on arrival there it was discovered that the shipyard had closed six months previously. Repairs were carried out by the Crichton-Vulcan shipyard, Turku, Finland. The work had to be done offshore as the Finnish government applied pressure on Crichton-Vulcan not to fulfil the job.

Repairs were completed on 4 February 1961 and the ship sailed for Ornö, Sweden, where she arrived on 6 February. That day, a storm blew up, and a loud crack was heard from the mast. Repairs to the insulators were made the next day at the Finnboda shipyard. On 21 February, Bon Jour sailed for her anchorage and began broadcasting as Radio Nord. She was forced to return to Finnboda for further repair work after a few days. Bon Jour returned to her anchorage on 1 March, but the following day the Swedish government passed a law enabling the confiscation of broadcasting equipment from any ship operating in Swedish waters. They also applied pressure on the Nicaraguan government to withdraw the ships' registration. On 8 March 1961, Bon Jour started broadcasting as Radio Nord from 58°48′05″N 18°24′05″E, in international waters off Stockholm. The programmes on Radio Nord were mostly pre-recorded. As well as supply by tender from Nynäshamn, programme tapes and other material were got to the ship packing them in a canister which was dropped astern of Bon Jour by a light aircraft. Only one canister failed to reach the ship.

=== Magda Maria ===
Bon Jour was reflagged to Panama and renamed Magda Maria. On 6 December 1961, the ship was caught in a severe storm and almost foundered. The next day, she put into Sandhamn for repairs which included a broken mast stay. Her broadcasting equipment was not confiscated as it was recognised that putting into port was an emergency situation. On 8 March, Bon Jour returned to her anchorage. Radio Nord ceased broadcasting on 30 June 1962. On 4 July 1962, Magda Maria sailed for Ferrol, Spain where she was to undergo a refit, arriving on 2 August. Radio Nord was closed by the Swedish authorities and the ship was put up for sale. A law had been passed prohibiting Swedes from supplying offshore radio ships with stores, or from providing advertising services to the stations. This law was said to have been brought in to discourage Soviet propaganda ships from anchoring off the Swedish coast. A similar law was passed simultaneously by Denmark; both came into effect on 1 August 1962. Danish station Radio Mercur closed on July 31; having closed one month earlier, Radio Nord has the distinction of being the first offshore pirate to be closed as a result of government legislation.

=== Mi Amigo ===
==== 1962–1968 ====
Magda Maria was yet again renamed to Mi Amigo. She departed Ferrol on 14 September 1962 bound for the Thames Estuary, where she made some test broadcasts as Radio LN on 306 metres. Mi Amigo sailed to Ostend, Belgium, then to Vlissingen, Netherlands where she arrived on 11 January 1963. She departed Vlissingen on 15 January and was next reported as putting into Brest, France on 19 January for repairs to her steering gear. On 26 January, Mi Amigo departed Brest for Galveston, Texas where her American owners intended to convert her to a luxury yacht. She arrived on 4 March. It is reported that Mi Amigo broadcast for a short time whilst anchored off Galveston. Her studios were gutted and she was stripped of her broadcasting equipment in preparation for conversion to a yacht.

A proposed purchase by Project Atlanta Ltd, headed by Allan Crawford was stalled due to the closure of Radio Mercur, with financial backers reluctant to invest. It took until December 1963 before Crawford could raise the necessary finance. Mi Amigo departed Galveston on 28 December bound for Las Palmas, Spain where she arrived on 30 January 1964. On 5 February, she docked at Ferrol for repairs to be undertaken, including work aimed at improving her stability. Mi Amigo departed Ferrol on 15 February, bound for Corunna, where she arrived on 28 February. She departed Corunna on 3 March, bound for Greenore, Ireland where a 141-foot (43 m) new radio mast was to be fitted. Late delivery of the mast meant that she did not depart Greenore for the Thames Estuary until 28 March.

On 21 April 1964, the ship was caught in a gale off Land's End and the mast was damaged. The ship was anchored off Falmouth whilst repairs were carried out by riggers from Portsmouth. Mi Amigo arrived off Frinton-on-Sea on 27 April and began broadcasting as Radio Atlanta. Her crew were transported to the ship by the British motor barge Peterna on 9 May. Broadcasts from Mi Amigo led to complaints from the General Post Office that communications were being affected. As a result, Panama withdrew the ship's registration on 7 May. On 2 July, Radio Atlanta merged with Radio Caroline, with Mi Amigo broadcasting as Radio Caroline South. A new anchorage in the Thames Estuary was tried for a few days from 2 November but was unsuitable as it was too rough. Mi Amigo returned to her former position off Frinton.

On 20 January 1966, a force 8 gale blew up and Mi Amigo's anchors broke and the ship started to drift. This went unnoticed by the crew, who were watching a programme about the singer-songwriter Donovan, broadcasting having ended. The final song played that night had been Eve of Destruction by Barry McGuire. Dave Lee Travis went aloft to adjust the TV aerial and noticed that the ship was close to shore. He was also unable to see the Radio London ship Galaxy. Walton-on-the-Naze Coastguards were unable to raise the crew, and the tender Offshore One was sent to her aid. One of the methods of alerting the crew tried was an item on the television news. This was missed by the crew who had turned the television off as they had lost the signal due to the ship moving from its normal position. Mi Amigo was driven ashore at Frinton-on-Sea, Essex and the crew were rescued by Breeches buoy.

The crew, who included DJs Tony Blackburn, Tom Lodge and Graham Webb were taken to Walton-on-the-Naze police station where they were informed that they were classed as "shipwrecked and distressed mariners" and were entitled to free replacement clothing. A shopkeeper was persuaded to open up early so that the crew could be clothed, and accommodation was arranged in a hotel for the crew.

Attempts by the tug Titan to refloat her were unsuccessful. On 21 January, the captain of Mi Amigo managed to refloat her by kedging. The hull was inspected before Mi Amigo departed for Zaandam, Netherlands with Titan in attendance. Repairs were carried out by the Zaanlandse Scheepsbouw Maatschappij. During this period, Radio Caroline South was broadcast from Cheeta 2, which was available for sale as Radio Syd had been closed down by the Swedish authorities. Repairs were completed on 5 April and Mi Amigo resumed broadcasting on 16 April. The next day, Radio Caroline was off the air as there had been a short circuit in the aerial. There was a gale at the time which prevented the tender from bringing engineers to Mi Amigo. The bored DJs, including Tony Blackburn, Tony Prince and Norman St. John managed to fix the fault themselves and the station was soon back on air. Cheeta II served as a relay station between 27 April and 1 May 1966.

On 15 August 1967, the Marine Broadcasting Offences Act 1967 became law. The four DJs on board Mi Amigo at that time were Ross Brown, Robbie Dale, Spangles Muldoon and Johnnie Walker. On 3 March 1968, Titan pulled alongside Mi Amigo and Radio Caroline was ordered to close down. The crew were locked in the ship's lounge. The Offshore Supply Company seized Mi Amigo and Fredericia as security for £30,000 they were owed. Both ships were towed to Amsterdam. It was planned to use the Oceaan VII as a replacement for Mi Amigo, but the story was leaked by newspapers and the ships owners were told that they would be summonsed if the ship was used to broadcast pirate radio.

==== 1972–1980 ====
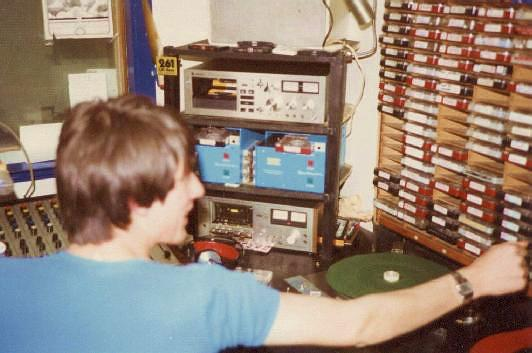
A studio on board Mi Amigo (1970s)

On 29 May 1972, Mi Amigo was sold at auction for ƒ20,000 to the Hofman Shipping Company, who had bought her on behalf of Rob Vermaat and Gerard van Dam. Although it was assumed that Mi Amigo would be scrapped, the Dutch Free Radio Organisation announced that she was to become a Free Radio Museum. The studios and cabins were restored and Mi Amigo departed Amsterdam on 2 September apparently bound for England. The next day, she anchored off Scheveningen. During October and November, test transmissions were made which consisted only of playing music and no station identification was given. On 9 November, Spangles Muldoon spoke live on air.

A force 11 storm on 13 November resulted in Mi Amigo losing her anchor and the mast collapsing. A makeshift aerial was erected on 30 November. Broadcasting began on 1 December, still without the DJs giving their name or using a station name. On 17 December, the name Radio 199 was used. From 22 December, the name Radio Caroline was used. On 28 December, some of the DJs refused to work any more as they had not been paid. The next day, HNLMS Limburg came alongside Mi Amigo accompanied by the tender Zeemeeuw, which the striking DJs boarded. The dispute was settled and Radio Caroline resumed broadcasting.

On 30 December, Mi Amigo was towed to IJmuiden by the tender Euro Trip. Permission to enter port was initially refused as Mi Amigo had no papers. Assurances were given that port fees would be paid, and Mi Amigo was allowed to dock in Amsterdam. Officers from the Dutch Radio Controle Dienst boarded the ship, but her transmitting equipment was not confiscated as it was incomplete. Members of the Scheepvaartinspectie declared that the MV Mi Amigo was unseaworthy and ordered repairs to be made. At court in Haarlem, an injunction was granted to the captain of Mi Amigo and the ship was impounded. On 1 January 1973, two tugs towed Mi Amigo to IJmuiden where the Scheepvaartinspectie ordered that a leak in the engine room was repaired, giving the crew just two hours to complete the task. Early the next day, outstanding monies were paid, and Mi Amigo was allowed to sail.

On 18 January 1973, a mayday was broadcast by Mi Amigo at 23:50 because of a fire in the engine room. The fire was extinguished within ten minutes. On 2 April, Radio Veronica's ship Norderney ran aground off Scheveningen, Netherlands during a force 12 hurricane. Mi Amigo then broadcast for Radio Veronica as well as for Caroline, with two new studios being built for the purpose. The money earned from this paid for a new radio mast. Between July and October Radio Atlantis bought airtime on the ship to broadcast pre-recorded daytime programmes.

On 1 October, the new mast collapsed. A makeshift aerial was erected and the ship resumed transmission on 4 October, but ceased transmission on 18 October when the mast failed. A new 165-foot-tall (50 m) mast was completed by 24 December. On December 28, Radio Mi Amigo was first broadcast from Mi Amigo, replacing Radio Atlantis which had acquired its own ship, the MV Jeanine. Radio Mi Amigo formally opened on 1 January 1974. From 7 January, Radio Seagull was broadcast, the name changing to Radio Caroline on 23 February.

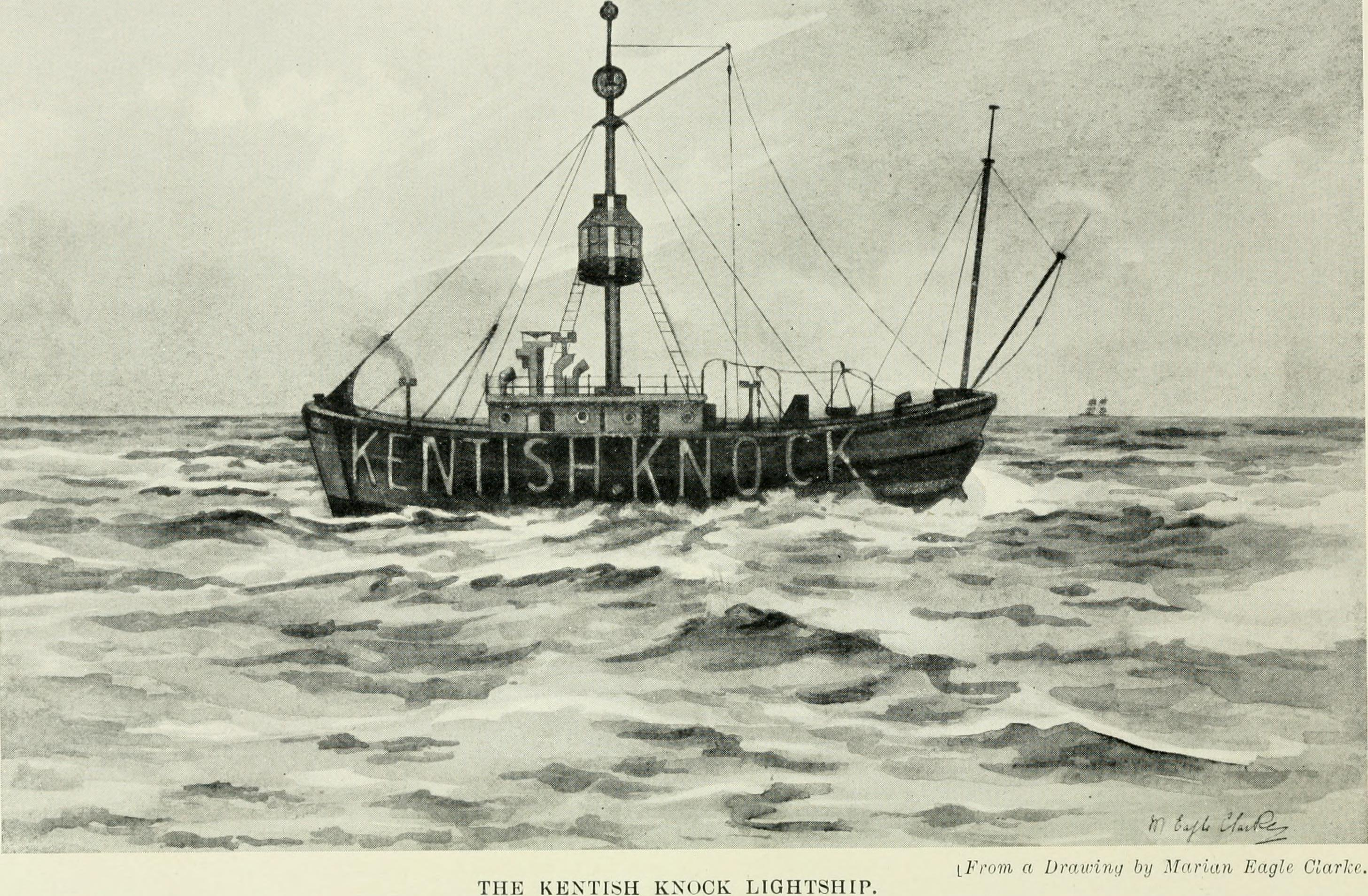
The Kentish Knock Lightship as published in Studies in Bird Migration (1912) by William Eagle Clarke

On 29 August 1974, Mi Amigo was towed across the North Sea by the MV Dolfijn. She was anchored near the Kentish Knock Lightship, some 18 nautical miles (33 km) off the Essex coast on 30 August. This move was timed to coincide with the passage of the Dutch Marine Offences Act on September 1, 1974.

At 16:30 on 8 November 1975, Mi Amigo's anchor chain broke and the ship began to drift, running aground on the Longsand Head Sands. She was refloated at 19:55 but continued to drift and entered United Kingdom territorial waters at 22:03. The Coastguard was flooded with calls from listeners to Radio Caroline. The engine on Mi Amigo failed about this time. On 9 November, the ship was anchored near to the South Edinburgh Number 2 buoy. Her position was confirmed by the lighthouse tender Mermaid but she was declared to be a danger to shipping at that position. On 13 November, Mi Amigo was towed to the South Edinburgh Number 3 buoy, from where she recommenced broadcasting. The following day, Mi Amigo was boarded by police and Home Office officials who ordered that broadcasting be stopped. On 17 November, coastguards at North Foreland were contacted and told that the ship had lost her main anchor. The Margate Lifeboat was sent to her aid and took off two crew. Mi Amigo's captain was told that no tug was available to assist her. He refused an offer to return to shore. The two crew members were landed at Ramsgate as conditions were too rough to land them at Margate. On 23 November, Mi Amigo was anchored at 51°39′42″N 1°31′52″E, some 17 nautical miles (31 km) off Margate.

On 10 September 1976, one studio was put out of action when a porthole was broken by a wave, flooding the studio. At 20:30 the anchor chain broke in a force 9 gale. Lifeboats and search and rescue helicopters based at RAF Manston were placed on standby. At 02:30 on 11 September, Mi Amigo ran aground on a sandbank and was holed in two places. Broadcasting ceased as the ship was 6 feet (1.83 m) deep in water in places. The Dutch crew members were taken off the ship and landed at Ostend. Whilst there, they searched an impounded oil tanker and found an anchor and chain, which they appropriated for use on Mi Amigo. The ship was towed clear of the sandbank on 16 September.

In the spring of 1977 two Dutch DJs of Radio Mi Amigo went on strike protesting against the bad and dangerous condition the ship was in, and ridiculed by the staff ashore in Spain, left the ship. Although nothing had been done to improve the ship's safety and seaworthiness, both DJs returned to the ship in October 1977, resuming their shows. During the winter of 1977/1978 due to the project running out of financial assets the crew didn't get any cargo aboard for three weeks, no food and water nor any technical spare parts and fuel.

On 20 October 1978 the generator failed, a regular event, but this time couldn't be restarted. The pumps failed and sea water caused the ship to list heavily. The crew including the captain left the ship by lifeboat. A few weeks later radio and self-taught board technician Peter Chicago returned by rubber boat attempting to repair the ship's machinery, getting the ship afloat and getting the generator and radio equipment working again, in which he achieved. Although most of the crew and the captain returned most of the DJs didn't. Sylvain Tack, the Flemish business man behind Radio Mi Amigo Internationaal, had lost interest in his project and had put the ship (of which he operated Radio Mi Amigo, but of which he lacked any ownership), the radio equipment and the project's assets in Spain on sale. The ship was regarded as an unseaworthy wreck and in fact wasn't on sale at all, alike the radio equipment, hence Ronan O'Rahilly decided to show up again as the station's operational manager and went looking for new investors to a renewed offshore radio project Caroline. An offer by Gerard van Dam to run a renewed Radio Delmare (which had lost her ship MV Aegir in September 1978) from aboard the MV Mi Amigo was turned down as plans were to broadcast 24 hours a day, which would disable any Radio Caroline broadcasts. However, Van Dam offered spare parts from the scrapped MV Aegir, including a badly needed second generator and radio transmitter spare parts.

On 18 January 1979, Mi Amigo sprang a leak. A mayday was issued on 19 January which was received by the Thames Coastguard. Three vessels went to the aid of Mi Amigo, the May Crest, Sand Serin and Cambrai. The ship was abandoned, but later boarded and salvaged.

While the newly attracted Radio Mi Amigo project investors leased the MV Magdalena ship anchored in January 1979 at the Dutch coast, without new investors O'Rahilly decided that Radio Caroline should return with a new format, broadcasting the usual AOR format at night while at daytime aiming a Dutch-languaged family radio/top 40 format aiming at the Netherlands and Flanders, like Radio Mi Amigo did before. On 15 April 1979 the bi-lingually organized 24-hour-a-day broadcasts resumed. The Dutch service had assembled a completely new team of DJs, which became known as the Golden Team. After their Mi Amigo employment their radio innovations reshaped the Dutch media landscape.

=== Sinking ===
On 19 March 1980, Mi Amigo's anchor chain broke in a force 10 storm. She drifted for 10 nautical miles (19 km) before running aground on the Longsands Bank. At 23:58, the final broadcast was made by DJs Stevie Gordon and Tom Anderson. The Sheerness Lifeboat attended Mi Amigo and took off the crew. The ship sank on 20 March at 51°35′00″N 1°17′20″E leaving only the 127-foot-tall (39 m) mast above the water. On 22 May, Thanet District Council announced plans to refloat Mi Amigo and turn her into a museum ship at Ramsgate, but the ship remained as a wreck. The mast collapsed at the end of July 1986, a fact which was reported by Trinity House on 2 August. It was announced on 13 September that the position of the wreck of Mi Amigo (51°35'00.0"N 1°17'20.0"E) was to be marked by a buoy. Mi Amigo lies in 8 to 16 feet (2.4 to 4.9 m) of water.

== Broadcasting history ==
The following radio stations were broadcast from the ship. Short periods of interruption due to technical problems and strandings are disregarded; not, however, those due to being entered and towed, and docking.

Station	From	To
Radio Nord	8 March 1961	30 June 1962
Radio Atlanta	9 May 1964	2 July 1964
Radio Caroline	3 July 1964	3 March 1968
Radio 199	18 December 1972	21 December 1972
Radio Caroline	22 December 1972	30 December 1972
Radio Caroline	2 January 1973	14 July 1973
Radio Veronica	11 April 1973	20 April 1973
Radio Atlantis	15 July 1973	18 October 1973
Radio Seagull	24 July 1973	18 October 1973
Radio Mi Amigo International	28 December 1973	20 October 1978
Radio Seagull	7 January 1974	22 February 1974
Radio Caroline	23 February 1974	20 October 1978
Radio Caroline	15 April 1979	19 March 1980
