= Simon Dee =

British television interviewer and radio disc jockey

- Simon Dee in 1967
- Born: Cyril Nicholas Henty-Dodd; 28 July 1935; Manchester, England
- Died: 29 August 2009 (aged 74); Winchester, Hampshire, England
- Education: Brighton College, Shrewsbury School
- Years active: 1964–1970, 1987-1989, 2003
- Known for: Disc jockey, broadcaster
- Spouses: Beryl Cooper (m. 1959) Sara Terry (m. 1975) Judith Wilson (m. 1995)
- Children: 4

Cyril Nicholas Henty-Dodd (28 July 1935 – 29 August 2009), better known by his stage name Simon Dee, was a British television interviewer and radio disc jockey who hosted a twice-weekly BBC TV chat show, Dee Time, in the late 1960s. After moving to London Weekend Television (LWT) in 1970, he was dropped and his career never recovered.

== Early life and career ==
Dee was born on 28 July 1935, in Manchester, the only child of Cyril Edward Dodd (1906–1980) and Doris Gwendoline Pilling (née Simon) (1907–1952) who married in 1934 in Salford (a Radio Caroline biography gave his birthplace as Ottawa, Ontario, Canada). He was educated at Shrewsbury School, from which he was expelled, and thereafter at Brighton College.

He served his compulsory national service with a Royal Air Force photo-reconnaissance unit, processing aerial photographs taken during the 1956 Suez Crisis. He was wounded in the face by a sniper in Cyprus. While stationed in Baghdad with RAF Intelligence and, having been involved with the domestic radio station at nearby RAF Habbaniya, he auditioned for British Forces Radio.

Demobilised in 1958, his first civilian jobs included a bouncer in a coffee bar, actor, photographic assistant to Balfour de Havilland (dismissed when he loaded the wrong film into the camera for a fashion shoot and none of the photos came out), builders' labourer, leaf-sweeper in Hyde Park, and vacuum cleaner salesman.

== Broadcasting career ==
=== Radio Caroline ===
In 1964, Dee joined Radio Caroline, a pirate radio station broadcasting pop music from a ship moored outside UK territorial waters. He witnessed the station's construction (and that of its rival station Radio Atlanta) at the Irish port of Greenore, and sailed with the ship to its anchorage off the coast of Essex. On 28 March, his was the first live voice on the radio station, welcoming listeners and handing over to the only other DJ on the ship at the time, Chris Moore, for the opening programme (the first voice heard on the station, in pre-recorded promotions, was allegedly that of John Junkin).

In August 1964, Radio Atlanta merged with Caroline and became Radio Caroline South. Dee transferred to the former Atlanta ship when the original ship sailed to an anchorage off the Isle of Man to become Radio Caroline North. He left in 1965 to go freelance, but had fallen out with directors of the station beforehand, having refused to play certain records and another occasion when he disobeyed the ship captain's orders.

=== BBC ===
In 1965, Dee was given a job on the BBC Light Programme, firstly introducing the station's 'Swing into Summer' slot and 'Stay Late' show on a Sunday evening, before taking over a late-night show on Saturdays. He also worked on Radio Luxembourg. He told a reporter at the time that he left Caroline "while the going was good". He joined the team presenting Top of the Pops in 1966, replacing David Jacobs, and the following year introduced the Monday edition of Midday Spin on the Light Programme and then Radio 1 from September 1967. He fell into early disfavour on Radio 1 after twice playing Scott Walker's recording of Jacques Brel's song "Jackie", which had been banned by the BBC.

He quit Radio 1 in December 1967 to concentrate on his TV career.

==== Dee Time ====
In 1967, Dee began his early evening chat show Dee Time on BBC1. The show became very popular, with up to 18 million viewers. It opened with sports announcer Len Martin announcing "It's Siiiiimon Dee!", imitating The Tonight Show Starring Johnny Carson, and closed with a film sequence of Dee driving off in an E-type Jaguar with blonde model Lorna McDonough. McDonough appeared anonymously at the time, dressed in a mini-skirt and "kinky"-style boots. The opening sequence has been described as both "iconic" of the times and a "visual cliché" that lent itself to parody (for example, by comedian Benny Hill). Dee's biographer Richard Wiseman, who was associate producer of a "one-off" revival of Dee Time for Channel 4 in 2003, considered that the scene was what "most people who lived in Britain during the Sixties will remember him for".

Only two complete editions of Dee Time survive in the BBC Archives; the programmes were transmitted live and the BBC seldom retained recordings at the time. Dee became very successful and adopted an extravagant lifestyle. Also in 1967, he was the host of the Miss World contest transmitted live on BBC1 from the Lyceum Ballroom, London. He also had cameo roles in films, including The Italian Job (1969) and Doctor in Trouble (1970).

In the 2004 Channel 4 TV programme Dee Construction, fellow DJ Tony Blackburn recalled, "He used to drive up and down the King's Road in an Aston Martin driven by his secretary. To be honest, I thought that was a bit of a waste of money".

=== ITV ===
Owing to a disagreement between the BBC and Dee over his huge salary demands, his contract was reviewed in 1969 and he left the BBC. Dee was being paid £250 per show (equivalent to £3600 today) and claimed ITV were offering him £1000. It is said that the BBC's Head of Light Entertainment Bill Cotton not only refused the pay rise that Dee demanded, but said that he would cut his wages by 20% "to test his loyalty". He was offered £100,000 for a two-year contract with the ITV contractor London Weekend Television and commenced a new series, The Simon Dee Show, on Sunday evenings, beginning in January 1970. It proved a ratings disaster as it was broadcast late in the evening after David Frost's programme. This was coupled with the show only being part-networked, with Granada Television screening each edition a week later on a Saturday and Yorkshire Television not transmitting the show at all.

Dee fell out with the station management and after only a few months on the air his contract was terminated. There was friction between Dee and David Frost, who was part-owner of LWT. Dee's programme was broadcast immediately following Frost's; both were talk shows, and Frost thought that some of Dee's items would make the shows too similar. Dee charged that Frost was deliberately sabotaging his programme. After a bizarre interview with actor George Lazenby, who discussed at length his theories about the assassination of US President John F. Kennedy, Dee's show was dropped by LWT.

=== Decline ===
In June 1970, Dee joined his former Radio Caroline boss, Ronan O'Rahilly, to campaign for pirate radio and against the Labour government's Marine Broadcasting Offences Act 1967, issuing a poster of Prime Minister Harold Wilson dressed as Chinese dictator Mao Tse-tung. Pirate radio remained a political issue and, in the run up to the 1970 general election that summer, Radio Caroline International launched a campaign in support of the Conservative Party, which supported commercial radio. Dee later said that there was an "Establishment plot" against him because of his open opposition to Wilson: government files were later released showing that he was being monitored by the Security Service. Dee also believed that his phone had been tapped because of his opposition to Britain's mooted membership of the Common Market.

Dee officially opened the Northside Shopping Centre in Dublin, Ireland on 1 October 1970.

Having alienated both the BBC and ITV, Dee disappeared from the airwaves. He signed on for unemployment benefit at the Fulham labour exchange, giving rise to considerable press coverage. Unable to revive his show business career, he took a job as a bus driver.

=== Later career ===
Dee later found a few broadcasting jobs. In 1972 he was very briefly heard on BBC Radio Kent (which was then known as BBC Radio Medway), where he presented the Saturday afternoon sports show, mixing music with sport.

In the late 1970s, he was signed to appear as holiday cover on the Reading-based Radio 210 but never made it to air.

In December 1987 Dee joined BBC Radio 2. His first broadcast for the station was on Boxing Day that year when he hosted a listeners' all-time-favourite Top 20.

In early 1988 he became a guest presenter on the station's Sounds of the 60s programme on a Saturday morning. He then began hosting the show on a temporary basis between April and July.

His success led him to host the show on a permanent basis in September the same year, but this engagement came to an end in March 1989 amid disputes with the BBC about the show's location in Bristol and his wish for it to be transmitted live.

In 2003, Victor Lewis-Smith arranged for a one-off new live edition of Dee Time to be broadcast on Channel 4, following Dee Construction, which covered Dee's career.

== Legal issues ==
Consumed by debt, Dee made several court appearances and in 1974 served 28 days in Pentonville Prison for non-payment of rates on his former Chelsea home. Every time he left his cell the prisoners on his wing shouted, "It's Siiiiiimon Dee!" He was so shocked by prison that he swore he would never get into debt again. On another occasion he was jailed for vandalising a lavatory seat with Petula Clark's face painted on it, which he thought was disrespectful to her.

== Death ==
On 29 August 2009, Dee died of bone cancer in Winchester, Hampshire, aged 74.

== In popular culture ==
- The comedian Benny Hill parodied Dee and Dee Time as the character "Tommy Tupper" and his chat show Tupper Time. Tupper's guests are a 107-year-old man who drops dead while being introduced, a vicar who strolls in with his flies unbuttoned, a celebrity actor who hardly says a word, and an actress who is very drunk. This sketch is included in the compilation film The Best of Benny Hill.
- In the fourth series of the BBC radio comedy programme Round the Horne, some shows featured "Radio Balls Pond Road", anchored by Dee, portrayed by Kenneth Williams, and the words, "Siiiiiimon Dee", would be followed by Hugh Paddick's deadpan addition of a suffix such as "-pressed", "-praved" or "-ceased".
- Stanley Baxter once parodied his show as Bee Time.
- Actress Elizabeth Hurley has claimed that Dee was the model for the character Austin Powers in the spoof 1960s films of 1997–2002.

== Filmography ==
Year	Title	Role	Notes
1969	The Italian Job	Shirtmaker	
1970	Doctor in Trouble	Basil Beauchamp	(final film role)
