= Christopher Moore (DJ) =

British DJ (1940–2021)

Christopher Moore (16 April 1940 – 2 January 2021) was a co-founder of the offshore pirate radio ship Radio Caroline, and the first voice to be heard on the air from that station. His opening words were "This is Radio Caroline on 199, your all-day music station".

The first song played on Radio Caroline was by the Rolling Stones. At its peak in 1967, the station had millions of listeners, and it revolutionised radio broadcasting in the UK. In 1991, Moore was interviewed extensively for the BBC TV show A Pirate's Tale, where he described his key role in detail.

Moore is a member of the Pirate Radio Hall of Fame. Moore, who had variously been a club DJ, merchant naval steward, and photographer, had become involved in Radio Caroline when he met the station's founder, Ronan O'Rahilly. Moore's Chelsea flatmate, Ian Ross (later a novelist), introduced O'Rahilly to his father, New Zealand-born Charles Ross, who in turn helped O'Rahilly raise the £250,000 needed to start what became Britain's first pirate radio station in April 1964.

Although Moore was the first voice to be heard on Radio Caroline, the first programme was hosted by Simon Dee, who subsequently became a TV chat show host of Dee Time on the BBC.

Moore died on 2 January 2021 at the age of 80.
