= Radio Caroline =

UK radio station

- Radio Caroline Logo
- Broadcast area: United Kingdom, Republic of Ireland, parts of Continental Europe and Internationally via Radio Caroline website
- Frequencies: AM: 648 kHz (1368 kHz for Radio Caroline North broadcasts); DAB
- RDS: Radio Caroline

Programming
- Language: English
- Format: Rock/Alternative 1970s : Album Orientated Rock 1980s: (i) 963 kHz: unformatted free-choice album format, with news. (ii) 576 kHz: continuation of above, with slightly more singles played. News service at peak hours. (iii) 558 kHz: strict pop and oldies mainstream format (no presenter music choice) with strict adherence to format clocks. DJs could choose ordering of oldies – all current pop hits in strict rotation. News at peak hours: 7, 8, 9 am, 1 pm; 5, 6, 7 pm, with headlines at 6:30 am, 7:30 am and 8:30 am. Footnotes: Caroline 'Overdrive' continued the album format during night-time once the mainstream pop service was re-established on 576 kHz, 585 kHz and then 558 kHz. Firstly on 963 kHz, then from 1988 – August 1989 on 819 kHz.

Ownership
- Owner: Radio Caroline Limited
- Sister stations: Radio Caroline North; Radio Caroline Flashback; Radio Caroline Album Channel

History
- First air date: 27 March 1964; 62 years ago
- Former frequencies: AM: 1520 kHz (Caroline South); 1169 kHz (Caroline North); AM: 963 kHz; 576 kHz; 558 kHz

Technical information
- Licensing authority: Ofcom

Links
- Website: www.radiocaroline.co.uk

Radio Caroline is a British radio station founded in 1964 by Ronan O'Rahilly and Allan Crawford, initially to circumvent the record companies' control of popular music broadcasting in the United Kingdom and the BBC's radio broadcasting monopoly. Unlicensed by any government for most of its early life, it was a pirate radio station that never became illegal as such due to operating outside any national jurisdiction, although after the Marine, &c., Broadcasting (Offences) Act 1967 it became illegal for a British subject to associate with it.

The Radio Caroline name was used to broadcast from international waters, using five different ships with three different owners, from 1964 to 1990, and via satellite from 1998 to 2013. Since August 2000, Radio Caroline has also broadcast 24 hours a day via the Internet and by the occasional restricted service licence. Currently, the station broadcasts on 648 kHz AM across much of England and DAB radio in certain areas of the UK: these services are part of the Ofcom small-scale DAB+ trials. Caroline can be heard on DAB+ in Aldershot, Birmingham, Cambridge, Brighton, Glasgow, Norwich, London, Portsmouth, Poulton-le-Fylde and Woking on digital radio. Caroline can also be listened to over the internet.

In May 2017, Ofcom awarded the station a medium wave community radio licence to broadcast on 648 kHz to Suffolk and north Essex; full-time broadcasting, via a previously redundant BBC World Service frequency and transmitter mast at Orford Ness, commenced on 22 December 2017.

Radio Caroline broadcasts music from the 1960s to contemporary, with an emphasis on Album Orientated Rock (AOR) and "new" music from "carefully selected albums". On 1 January 2016, a second channel was launched called Caroline Flashback, playing pop music from the early 1950s to the early 1980s.

== 1964–1968: MV Caroline ==
Technical information
- Power: Radio Caroline North = 10kW (later 20kW). Radio Caroline South = 10kW (later 50 kW). Caroline 319 = from 8kW to 25kW Caroline 558 = approx. 5-6kW

=== Origins ===
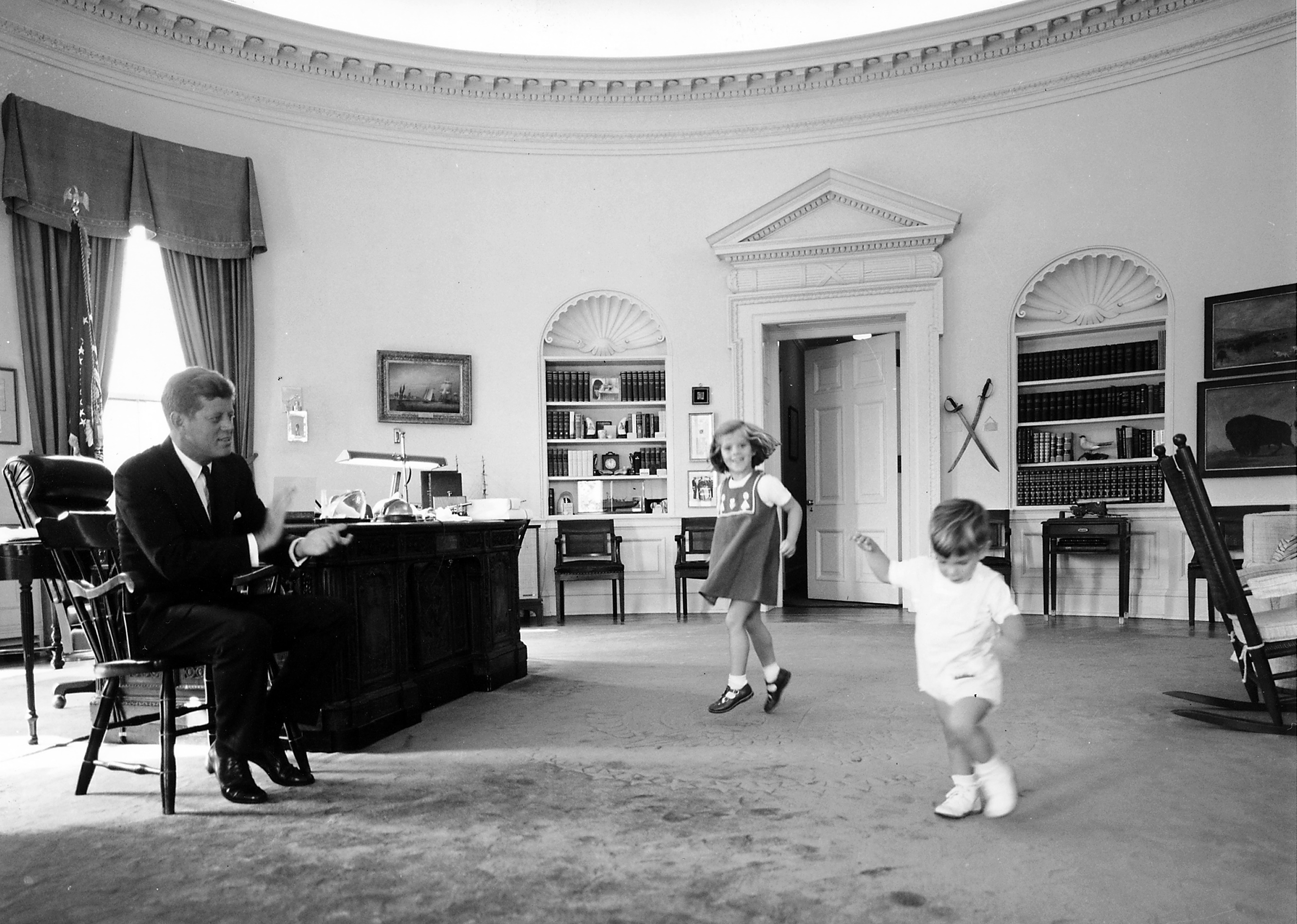
John F. Kennedy, Caroline and JFK Jr. in the photograph that is said to have inspired the name of Radio Caroline

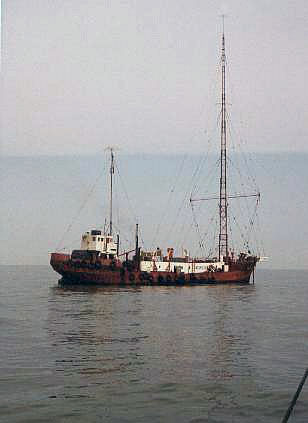
The MV Mi Amigo, c. 1974, the home of Radio Caroline South from 1964 to 1967

Radio Caroline was the brainchild of the Irish musician manager and businessman Ronan O'Rahilly, the idea being formulated following O'Rahilly's failure to obtain airplay for the records of one of his contracted artistes, Georgie Fame, on Radio Luxembourg or the BBC Light Programme. At this time it was Radio Luxembourg policy to only promote sponsored programmes funded by major record labels: EMI, Decca, Pye and Philips.

Undeterred by this failure, and encouraged by Scandinavian and Dutch radio pirates, in February 1964 O'Rahilly obtained the former Danish passenger ferry Fredericia which was subsequently taken to the Irish port of Greenore, which was under the ownership of O'Rahilly's father, Aodogán, in order for the vessel to be fitted out as a radio ship.

This was a busy time at Greenore with the work to the Fredericia being carried out in tandem with Allan Crawford's "Project Atlanta", which saw a similar conversion undertaken on the Mi Amigo.

=== Financing ===
Financial backing for the venture came from six investors, including John Sheffield (chairman of Norcros); Carl "Johnny" Ross (managing director of Ross Foods) and Jocelyn Stevens of Queen magazine, with which Radio Caroline shared its first office.

=== Origin of name ===
There are a multiplicity of stories with regard to how the station became known as Radio Caroline.

One of these centres around O'Rahilly choosing the name on a trip to the United States, having seen a picture in Life of Caroline Kennedy, along with her brother, John F. Kennedy Jr., innocently playing in the Oval Office of the White House whilst their father, John F Kennedy, looks on. It is said that this activity was reportedly interpreted by O'Rahilly as a playful, jovial disruption of government. One particular image conveying unthreatening joy was the cheeky 4½-year-old Caroline hiding at President John F Kennedy's feet beneath the battered Resolute desk.

Another tenable theory is that the radio station was named after Caroline Maudling, who was known by O'Rahilly at the time, and was the daughter of the British government minister Reginald Maudling.

A further theory is that the name was the choice of Jocelyn Stevens, who had played a prominent role in the planning stages of the offshore station. His editor of Queen, Beatrix Miller, is understood to have defined the profile of the target reader, being: "a twenty something, non intellectual who had left school at 16, and was a 'good time' girl called Caroline". Stevens believed that the same profile should be the target audience for the new offshore radio station, so the name Caroline was chosen.

=== First transmissions ===
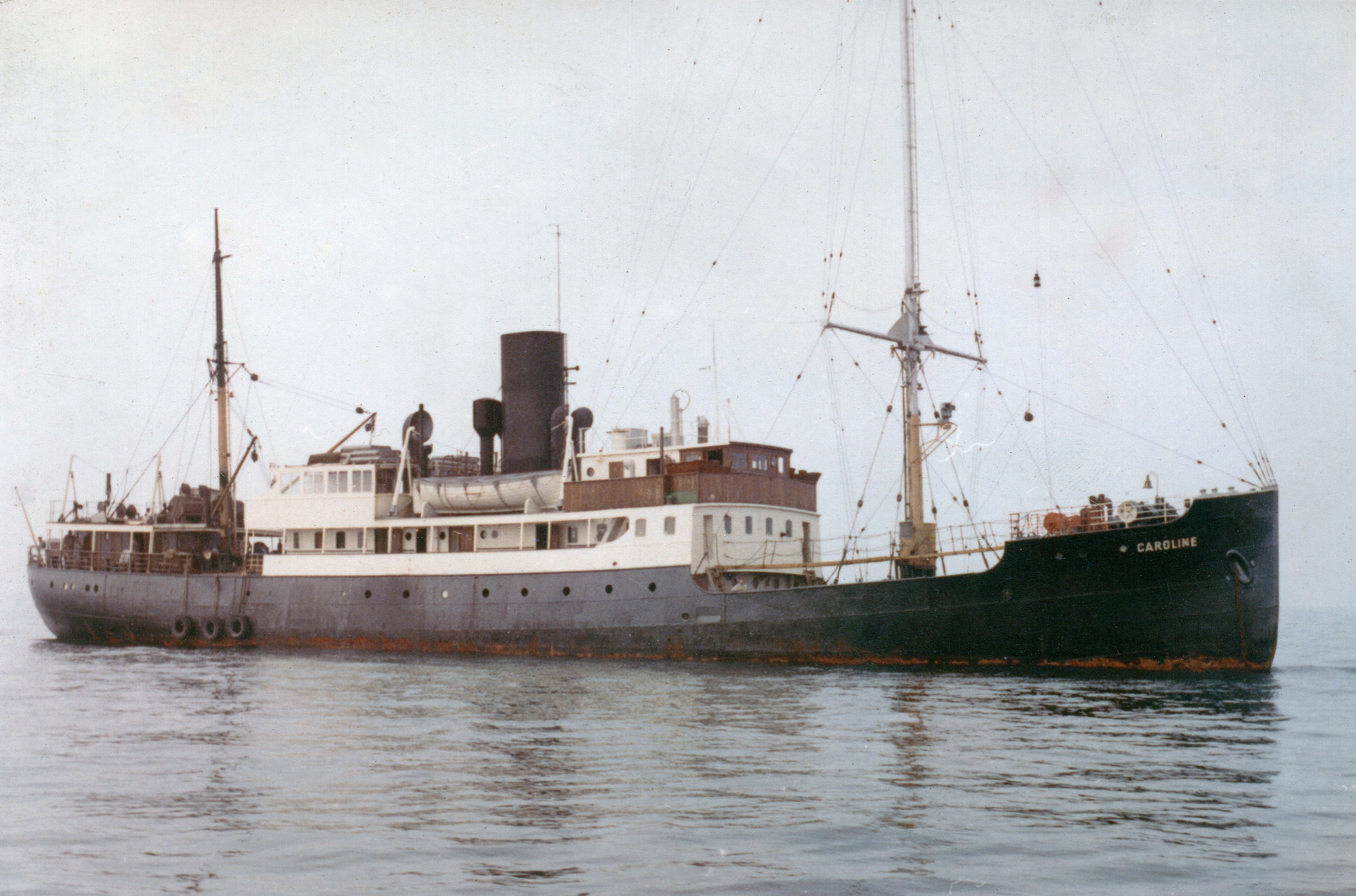
MV Caroline the vessel used as Radio Caroline North

Upon conclusion of her fitting out, the MV Fredericia was renamed MV Caroline with her port of registry changed to Panama. Caroline departed Greenore on March 23, 1964, to a supposed destination in Spain. She passed Land's End on 25 March, at which time she altered course and made passage through the English Channel and entered the North Sea where she anchored off Felixstowe, Suffolk.

MV Caroline began test transmissions on 27 March 1964 at 6:00 pm GMT and 10:00 pm, and on 11:55 pm on 201 metres (1495 kHz). On 28 March, it began regular broadcasting at noon on 1520 kHz (announced as 199 metres) with the opening conducted by Simon Dee.

The first programme, which was pre-recorded, was hosted by Chris Moore. Radio Caroline's first musical theme was Jimmy McGriff's "Round Midnight", a jazz standard co-composed by Thelonious Monk. In March 1964, The Fortunes recorded Caroline, which became the station's theme, and "Round Midnight" was confined to closedown on Radio Caroline North after The World Tomorrow. The station's slogan was Your all-day music station. The Dutch offshore station Radio Veronica was on 1562 kHz and Radio Atlanta broadcast on 1493 kHz.

Radio Caroline's transmission output, in the region of 20 kW, was achieved by linking two 10 kW Continental Electronics transmitters. Broadcasting hours were 6 am to 6 pm to avoid competition from Radio Luxembourg, which began transmissions at 6 pm. The station returned at 8 pm and continued until after midnight to avoid competition with popular television programmes. Most of Radio Caroline's pop music programmes were targeted at housewives, and some later programming was aimed at children. Without serious competition, Radio Caroline gained a regular daytime audience of some 7 million.

=== Merger with Radio Atlanta ===
On 2 July 1964, Radio Atlanta and Radio Caroline's companies, Project Atlanta and Planet Productions, announced the stations were to merge, with Crawford and O'Rahilly as joint managing directors. Radio Atlanta closed at 8 p.m. BST that day. It was renamed Radio Caroline South and MV Mi Amigo remained off Frinton-on-Sea, while MV Caroline broadcast as Radio Caroline North.

Following the consolidation between the two companies, Caroline weighed anchor and sailed from Felixstowe en route to the Isle of Man, broadcasting as she went. The only broadcast staff on board were Tom Lodge and Jerry Leighton. Caroline took up station at her new anchorage on the southern tip of the Bahama Bank, Ramsey Bay, on 6 July 1964, at a position formerly occupied by the Bahama Bank Lightship. The two Caroline stations were now able to cover most of the British Isles.

Whilst the two Caroline stations transmitted separately, some programmes were pre-recorded on land and broadcast simultaneously from both ships. In October 1965, O'Rahilly bought Crawford's interest in the Mi Amigo and engaged Tom Lodge from Radio Caroline North to make programme changes and regain the audience from Radio London. Lodge hired new DJs and introduced free-form programming.

When the US-backed Radio London arrived off the coast of England, there was an unsuccessful attempt to merge its sales operation with that of Caroline before Radio London started transmissions. The new station introduced British audiences to slick American-style top 40 radio with electronic jingles produced by Dallas-based PAMS, and was an immediate success.

=== Broadcasting personnel ===
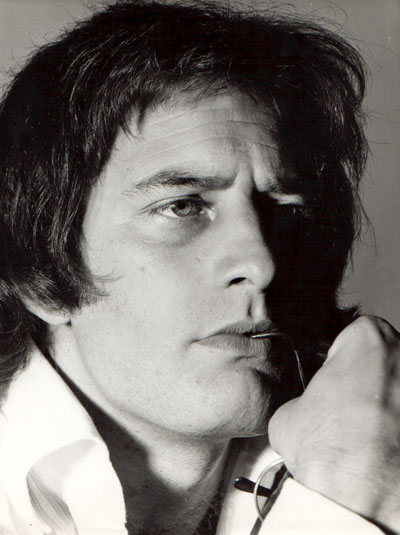
Emperor Rosko

Tom Lodge was a Radio Caroline disc jockey from 1964 until his death in 2012

Radio Caroline's first programme, on 28 March 1964, was presented by Chris Moore. Presenters Tony Blackburn, Roger Gale, Ray Teret, Simon Dee, Tony Prince, Spangles Muldoon, Keith Skues, Johnnie Walker, Robbie Dale, Dave Lee Travis, Tommy Vance, Tom Edwards, Bob Stewart and Andy Archer became well known. Some DJs from the United States and Commonwealth countries, such as Graham Webb, Emperor Rosko and Keith Hampshire were also heard. DJ Jack Spector, of the WMCA "Good Guys" in New York, regularly recorded for Radio Caroline. Syndicated shows from the US and recorded religious programmes were also broadcast. BBC Radio 2 newsreader Colin Berry started his career reading the news on Radio Caroline South.

In May 1965 Rick Wild, lead vocalist with The Overlanders, spent a week on board presenting mainstream pop and country music, and mid-September 1965, the crew and DJs on Mi Amigo were joined for the weekend by 1960s pop singer Sylvan Whittingham, who visited the ship to promote her single "We Don't Belong". Whittingham was unable to leave on the tender when a storm arose, and so spent the time helping present programmes, make jingles, and close the station at night.

=== Mi Amigo runs aground ===
On 20 January 1966, the Mi Amigo lost its anchor in a storm, drifted and ran aground on the beach at Frinton-on-Sea. The crew and broadcasting staff were rescued unharmed, but the ship's hull was damaged and repairs were carried out at Zaandam, Netherlands.

Between 31 January and 1 May, Radio Caroline South broadcast from the vessel Cheeta II, owned by Britt Wadner of Swedish offshore station Radio Syd, which was off the air because of pack ice in the Baltic Sea. The Cheeta II was equipped for FM broadcasting, so it was fitted with the 10 kW transmitter from the Mi Amigo, feeding a makeshift antenna. Whilst the resulting signal was low-powered, it did ensure that Caroline South's advertising revenue would continue.

On 18 April the Mi Amigo returned to its Frinton-on-Sea anchorage with a redesigned antenna and a new 50 kW transmitter and attempted to resume broadcasting, nominally on 259 metres to enable the same jingles as Radio Caroline North on 1169 kHz to be used, but actually 253 metres. Initially the transmitter was found to be too powerful for the antenna insulators, however by 27 April the Mi Amigo was fully operational.

Radio Caroline South's 259 metres signal was now near those of Radio London on 266 m (1133 kHz) and the BBC Light Programme on 247 m (1214 kHz). Radio Caroline North subsequently moved to 257 m (1169 kHz) but still called it 259 metres.

=== Radio City affair ===
In October 1965 negotiations began for Radio Caroline to take over Radio City, which broadcast from Shivering Sands Army Fort, a Second World War marine fort off the Kent coast. One of Radio Caroline's directors, Major Oliver Smedley, formerly of Radio Atlanta, entered into a partnership with Radio City's owner, pop group manager Reginald Calvert and installed a more powerful transmitter on the fort. However, according to Gerry Bishop this transmitter was antiquated and failed to work. Smedley later withdrew from the deal.

On 20 June 1966, Smedley boarded the Shivering Sands Fort with ten workmen to repossess a transmitter that he had supplied, but had not been paid for. The next day, Calvert visited Smedley's home in Saffron Walden, Essex, to demand the departure of the raiders and the return of vital transmitter parts. During a violent struggle, Calvert was shot dead. Smedley's men occupied the fort until 22 June.

Smedley was charged with Calvert's murder on 18 July, but this was reduced to a charge of manslaughter. Smedley's trial opened on 11 October at Chelmsford Assizes, where the jury acquitted him.

=== Legislation ===
Radio Caroline International
- Broadcast area: Southern England, western Europe, Northern England, Ireland and Scotland
- Frequency: wavelengths announced as 259 metres

Programming
- Format: popular music and news

Ownership
- Owner: Legal status unclear due to a need to conceal actual legal ownership.

History
- First air date: 15 August 1967

Technical information
- Power: 50 kW

In 1967, the UK Government enacted the Marine, &c., Broadcasting (Offences) Act 1967 (Marine Offences Act), outlawing advertising on or supplying an unlicensed offshore radio station from the UK. In an earlier House of Commons debate (in June 1966), the government had said that the pirate ships were a danger because of radio frequency interference to emergency shipping channels, and to overseas radio stations and the pirates were paying no royalties to artists, composers or record companies. Furthermore, it was stated that the pirates' use of wavelengths also broke international agreements.

The Manx parliament, the Tynwald, attempted to exclude the North ship from the legislation, appealing to the European Court on the legality of the act being applied to the Isle of Man. Two (Radio 270 and Radio London) of the remaining four UK-based offshore stations closed, but the two Caroline ships continued with their supply operation moved to Netherlands waters, where unlicensed ship-based broadcasting was not outlawed until 1974.

When the Marine Offences Act become law on 14 August 1967, Radio Caroline was renamed Radio Caroline International. Six weeks later, the BBC introduced its new national pop music station Radio 1, modelled largely on the successful offshore station Radio London, and employed many of the ex-pirate DJs. The BBC Light, Third, and Home programmes became Radios 2, 3 and 4 respectively.

On 3 March 1968, the radio ships Mi Amigo and Caroline were boarded and seized before the day's broadcasting began. They were towed to Amsterdam by a salvage company to secure unpaid bills for servicing by the Dutch tender company Wijsmuller Transport. Caroline was broken up for scrap in 1972.

Because of the rise of land-based pirate stations after the Marine Offences Act became law (usually stations run from bedrooms or outdoor sheds with small wattage transmitters), at least two stations later broadcast using the Caroline name, one based in Dublin. Those broadcasts took place between 1970 and 1973.

== 1970: Radio North Sea International ==
Radio Caroline International
- Broadcast area: Broadcasting from various locations offshore to Western Europe
- Frequencies: 244 M MW; 100.0 MHz FM; 6205 kHz SW

Programming
- Format: popular music and news
- Affiliations: A brief name change from Radio North Sea International during the UK General Election campaign, after which the station reverted to its original name.

Ownership
- Owner: Mebo Ltd

History
- First air date: 13 June–19 June 1970

Technical information
- Power: 105 kW MW
- ERP: 90 kW MW

On 24 March 1970, a radio ship named Mebo II anchored off the east coast of England during the UK general election campaign, broadcasting as Radio North Sea International (RNI). RNI operated on medium wave, short wave and FM. Its medium wave transmission was jammed by the UK authorities and on 13 June, RNI changed its name to Radio Caroline International with co-operation from Ronan O'Rahilly. Radio Caroline lobbied against the Labour Party, for the Conservative Party and for the introduction of licensed commercial radio in the United Kingdom. Following the election, RNI resumed its original name but jamming continued under the newly elected Conservative government. It was not until RNI returned to its original anchorage off the Netherlands that the jamming ceased.

== Caroline Television ==
News stories appeared in Europe announcing the start of Caroline Television from two Super Constellation aircraft using Stratovision technology. One would circle over the North Sea in international air space near the United Kingdom, while the other remained on standby. Presentations were made to US advertising agencies. These stories continued and included supposed co-operation by a former member of The Beatles and a sign-on date of 1 July; the station failed to appear. The TV operation was later found to be a publicity stunt.

== 1972–1980: Mi Amigo rescued ==
Radio Caroline and related stations
- Broadcast area: Broadcasting from various offshore locations to Western Europe
- Frequency: various

Programming
- Format: Album Orientated Rock

Ownership
- Owner: Status unclear and mainly operated by supporters
- Sister stations: Radio Atlantis (1973); Radio Mi-Amigo (1974–1978)

History
- First air date: 1972

Technical information
- Power: 10 kW, later 50 kW
- ERP: 27 KW (highly variable)

In 1972, MV Mi Amigo was bought for her scrap value at auction by enthusiast Gerard van Dam, who intended to use her as a free radio museum. O'Rahilly promised financial backing if van Dam could return the ship to broadcasting condition.

The ship anchored off the Dutch coastal resort of Scheveningen and was serviced and operated from the Netherlands. That autumn various tests, consisting of continuous music, were made on 259 metres. The station restarted just before Christmas as Radio 199 but soon became Radio Caroline, with a Top 40 format. DJs Chris Cary, broadcasting as Spangles Muldoon (who was also station manager), Andy Archer, Paul Alexander, Norman Barrington, Steve England, Johnny Jason and Peter Chicago (real name Peter Murtha) manned the station.

In late 1972, Radio Caroline had money problems. On 28 December, unpaid crew cut the Mi Amigo's generator fuel line and departed. Later that day, the Dutch Royal Navy returned the crew and fighting broke out on board. Two days later, Mi Amigo was towed to IJmuiden and seized because of unpaid bills. Because of the Christmas holidays, no solicitors were available to issue a writ and the ship lay in Amsterdam harbour until O'Rahilly arranged for it to be towed back to sea. The ship was further delayed by hull damage, and repaired before writs could be issued.

Between 11 and 20 April 1973, the ship broadcast for Radio Veronica while its ship, the MV Norderney, was aground. Caroline DJ Norman Barrington acted as technician, whilst news readers Freek Simon and Arend Langenberg continued the live news service. Tom Collins and Freek did live programmes on occasions the taped shows were unavailable, whilst Norman played the music. Because of a law that allows pirates in distress to come ashore without arrest, the running aground had no consequences for the crew. During summer 1973, it broadcast separate stations in English and Dutch simultaneously, on 773 kHz (389 metres} and 1187 kHz (253 m, announced as 259 m). Two aerials and twin transmitters were used for about six weeks until the aerial mast failed. To accommodate the second aerial, a second short mast, just in front of the bridge, was employed as the other end of the aerial fixed to the main mast.

=== Radio Atlantis and Radio Seagull ===
Around this time, O'Rahilly decided Caroline should adopt an album format similar to FM progressive rock stations in the US, an audience not catered for in Europe. This service was Radio Seagull and broadcast live during the evening.

Since Radio Caroline could not find enough advertising, it shared its nominal 259-metre wavelength (actually 1187 kHz or 253 metres) with Dutch-language pop stations. The first was a Belgian station called Radio Atlantis, owned by Belgian businessman Adriaan van Landschoot. Programmes were recorded on land and broadcast between 6 am and 7 pm. Rough weather sometimes prevented tapes from arriving and old programmes had to be repeated. Later in 1973, when the contract with Radio Caroline ended, the crew of Radio Atlantis moved to their own ship, the MV Jeanine.

Radio Seagull became Radio Caroline on 23 February 1974, retaining the album format. Throughout most of the 1970s, Radio Caroline could be heard only at night, calling itself "Europe's first and only album station".

=== Radio Mi Amigo ===
Another Belgian station, Radio Mi Amigo International, launched on 1 January 1974; it was run by Belgian businessman and Suzy Waffles owner Sylvain Tack. The station's offices and studios were in Brakel, Belgium, but moved to Castell-Platja d'Aro, Costa Brava, Spain in March 1975 after a raid by Belgian police. Here they produced programmes for Dutch-speaking holidaymakers, mostly Europop, Top 40, MOR and Dutch language popular music presented by Belgian, Dutch and occasionally English DJs with frequent commercials. Because commercial radio was prohibited in Belgium, Radio Mi Amigo had little competition from the former BRT State Radio and TV (now VRT Flemish State radio and TV) and became very popular in Belgium, the Netherlands and the UK. For the first years, advertising on the station was in demand. When Radio Veronica closed in 1974, some presenters moved to Radio Mi Amigo.

=== Loving Awareness ===
Caroline's album format meant that, although the station served a gap in the market, its audience was smaller than in the 1960s. Caroline also promoted O'Rahilly's concept of Loving Awareness (LA), a far-eastern philosophy of love and peace. Some DJs were embarrassed but some were fascinated by the challenge of an abstract concept.

In 1974, O'Rahilly set up a pop group called The Loving Awareness Band, comprising John Turnbull (guitar) and Mick Gallagher (keyboards) both formerly of Skip Bifferty and two session musicians, Norman Watt-Roy (bass) and Charlie Charles (drums). In 1976, The Loving Awareness Band released their only album, Loving Awareness on More Love Records (ML001), a label set up by O'Rahilly. The album was reissued on CD on Ross Records, c.1992, and in a "30th Anniversary Edition" with bonus material on SMC Records in 2005. The band broke up in 1977; Watt-Roy and Charles played on Ian Dury's New Boots and Panties!! album, and Turnbull and Gallagher joined them on the Stiff's tour, becoming The Blockheads.

=== Dutch legislation ===
The Dutch government banned unlicensed offshore radio on 1 September 1974. Radio Caroline continued, moving its headquarters and servicing operation to Spain. On 30 August 1974 Mi Amigo moved from the Dutch coast to the Knock Deep Channel, approximately 12 miles (19 km) from the British coast. After 31 August, shows for Radio Mi Amigo were delivered on cassettes rather than reel-to-reel tapes. Beginning in 1975, the cassettes were transported from Playa d'Aro on the Europa Bus service, which carried people from Amsterdam to Madrid at low prices. The tapes were picked up in Belgium at a bus stop, taken to a small aircraft and dropped in the sea close to the radio ship. The "Top 50" tapes were flown over by helicopter to get them on board more quickly.

The Mi Amigo was tendered clandestinely from Britain, France, Belgium and the Netherlands. Tenders and boat owners were warned, and some were prosecuted for ferrying staff and provisions to the ship. Belgium had outlawed offshore radio in 1962 and prosecuted advertisers, cutting the station's revenue. Belgian courts sentenced Tack and some DJs to fines and jail in absentia, although the prison terms were later cancelled.

=== Wavelength changes ===
The two stations experimented with different frequencies. After a short test on 773 kHz in late 1975, in May 1976, Radio Caroline began a daytime service on 1562 kHz (192 m) using a 10 kW transmitter, while its overnight service continued to share the 50 kW transmitter with Radio Mi Amigo's daytime programming on 1187 kHz (253 metres, announced as 259).

In December 1976, Radio Mi Amigo moved to 1562 kHz on the 50 kW transmitter, leaving Caroline on 1187 kHz 24 hours a day on the 10 kW. Radio Caroline had greater night-time interference, and it was decided to move Caroline to a new frequency. On 3 March 1977, Caroline closed, announcing that it would return six days later on 319 metres. To allow Radio Mi Amigo to continue broadcasting by day, the engineering work for Caroline's move had to be carried out over six nights, after the 50 kW transmitter was switched off.

Caroline returned on 9 March 1977 on 953 kHz, actually 315 metres but announced as 319. This gave reasonable reception by day, but strong heterodyne interference at night because the transmitter crystal was off-channel. In July Caroline moved to the adjacent channel, 962 kHz (312 metres but still called 319) and reception in the UK improved. Meanwhile, Radio Mi Amigo had interference on 1562 kHz and changed to 1412 kHz (212 m).

Finally, Radio Mi Amigo moved to 962 kHz on 1 December. Due to generator trouble, the two services could no longer be broadcast simultaneously and Radio Caroline again broadcast at night with both stations using the 50 kW transmitter and Radio Caroline began to receive more mail from the continent. At times, a 10 kW transmitter was used to save fuel and relieve the generators. The 10 kW transmitters could run on the Henschel generator beside the two main MAN units and also a Cummins unit on the aft deck behind the wheelhouse.

In late 1977, Radio Caroline began sponsored evangelical programmes, and music programmes began at 9 pm On 20 October 1978, technical and financial problems put the Mi Amigo off the air. Unhappy at the loss of advertising, Radio Mi Amigo terminated its contract with Caroline in November 1978 and broadcast from its own ship, the MV Magdalena later that year, but this was short-lived. Broadcasting was in Dutch and English by day and in English at night, although for the first few months broadcasting finished at 10 pm. On 19 January 1979, the ageing ship took in water and a lifeboat was called to rescue the crew members. Radio Caroline returned to the air on 15 April 1979. The first record played was "Fool (If You Think It's Over)", by Chris Rea, dedicated to the British Home Office. During this period each night transmission of Radio Caroline started with "Calling Occupants of Interplanetary Craft" by the progressive rock band Klaatu, issued in 1976 on their album 3:47 EST.

=== Mi Amigo sinks ===
Just after midnight GMT on 20 March 1980, the MV Mi Amigo foundered in a storm after losing its anchor and drifting. It began taking in water and the crew was rescued by lifeboat. The generator was left running but the pumps could not manage and the vessel sank 10 minutes later. Three British nationals, a Dutchman and their canary (named Wilson after the former Labour Prime Minister Harold Wilson) were rescued. The last broadcast from the Mi Amigo was by Stevie Gordon and Tom Anderson:

(Gordon): Well, we're sorry to tell you that due to the severe weather conditions and the fact that we are shipping quite a lot of water, we are closing down, and the crew are at this stage leaving the ship. Obviously, we hope to be back with you as soon as possible, but just for the moment we would like to say goodbye.
(Anderson): It's not a very good occasion really, we have to hurry this because the lifeboat is standing by. We're not leaving and disappearing, we're going onto the lifeboat hoping that the pumps can take it; if they can, we'll be back, if not, well, we really don't like to say it.
(Gordon): I think we'll be back in one way or another.
(Anderson): Yeah. I think so.
(Gordon): For the moment from all of us, goodbye and God bless.

The crew of the Sheerness lifeboat Helen Turnbull were commended for the rescue of broadcasters Tom Anderson, Stevie Gordon, Nick Richards and Hans Verlaan from Mi Amigo while it was sinking in the Black Deep near Long Sand Bank. Having to manoeuvre the lifeboat alongside the stricken vessel 13 times in high seas and a north-easterly gale earned Coxswain Charles Bowry an RNLI Silver Medal. Each of his crew was awarded The Thanks of the Institution on vellum.

The Mi Amigo's 160-foot (49 m) mast remained erect for six years.

== 1983–1991: MV Ross Revenge ==
Radio Caroline
- Broadcast area: Geographic areas bordering upon North Sea
- Frequency: 963 kHz (wavelength announced as "319" metres) later moving to 819 kHz with additional transmitter in 531–594 kHz range (principally 558 kHz)

Programming
- Format: album rock and news

Ownership
- Owner: Ownership was hidden due to illegality of operation

History
- First air date: August 1983

Technical information
- Power: 50 kW (second 10 kW transmitter later added)
- ERP: 27 kW (highly variable)

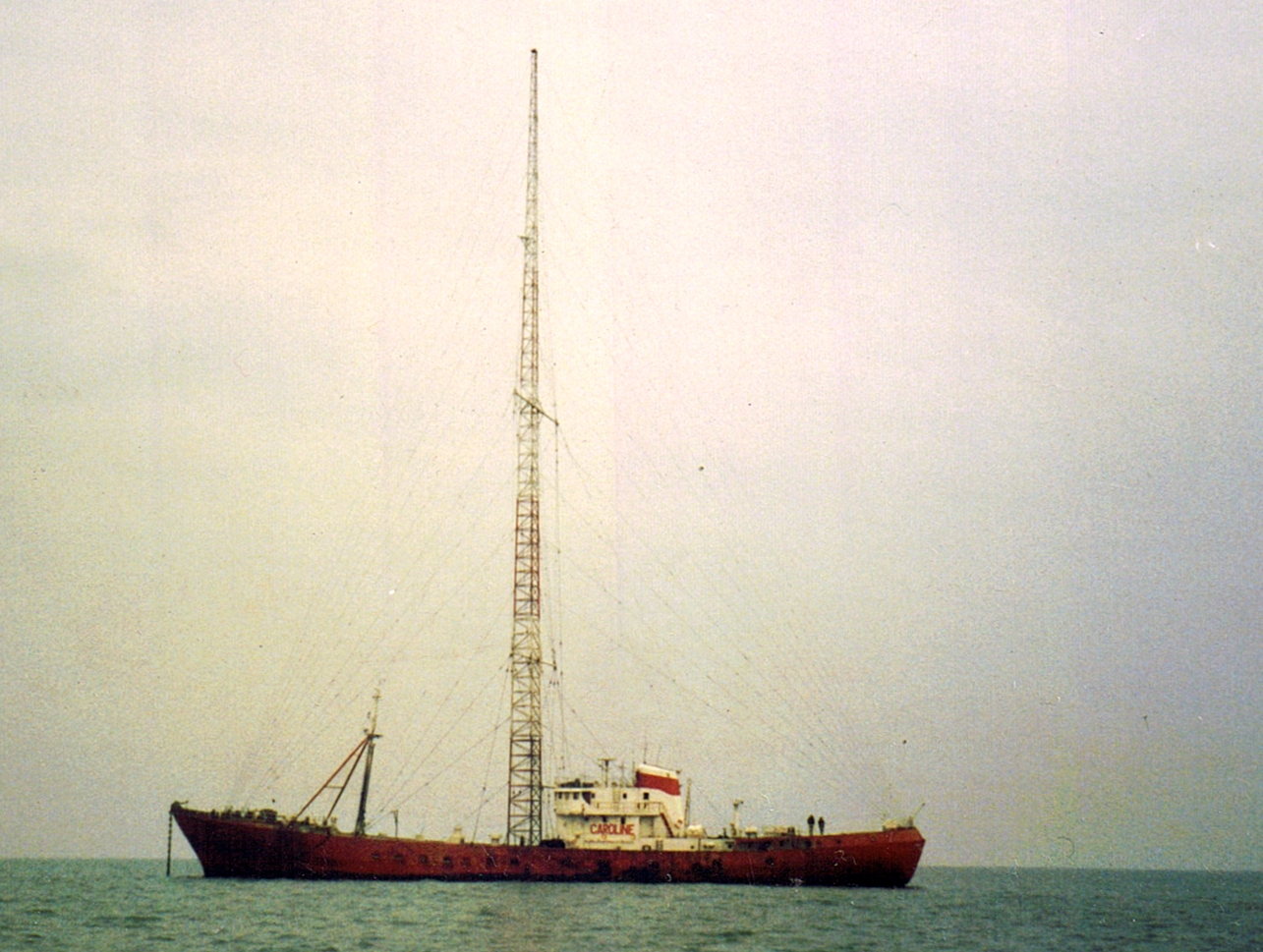
MV Ross Revenge, home of Radio Caroline from 1983

Radio Caroline restarted in August 1983 from a new radio ship, the MV Ross Revenge, an ex-North Sea factory fishing trawler used during the Anglo-Icelandic Cod War by Ross Fisheries. It had an antenna system radiating from a 300-foot (91 m) high mast, the tallest on any ship in the world. It left Spain with an incomplete studio, to avoid legal entanglements. Radio Caroline began to broadcast from the ship on 19 August 1983, with unwanted mechanical sounds on speech. The station was opened by DJ Tom Anderson, who had said "goodbye" from the sinking Mi Amigo in 1980.

The Ross Revenge was larger than Mi Amigo and with more elaborate transmitting equipment: in 1983, two 5 kW RCA transmitters and a RCA 50 kW unit. One 5 kW transmitter was initially not serviceable. When Radio Monique hired the main transmitter, spare parts were taken from a fourth transmitter to convert the 5 kW into a 10 kW unit, the RCA 5 and 10 kW transmitters having similar designs. The remaining 5 kW transmitter was later converted for short wave use. The Ross Revenge also featured powerful generators.

O'Rahilly wanted Radio Caroline to become an oldies station. He was opposed by some DJs and crew who had worked on the Mi Amigo and the album format stayed along with presenters such as Andy Archer, Samantha Dubois, Grant Benson, Robin Ross and Simon Barrett. Officially, Radio Caroline was managed from offices in North America, with advertising from the US and Canada. In practice, day-to-day servicing was carried from France and the UK.

From the anchorage in the Knock Deep the Mi Amigo's mast could be seen on the horizon. Four studios were on board, enabling other broadcasting services. Radio Caroline tried several frequencies, among them 963 kHz, 576 kHz, 585 kHz (only from 25 March 1985 till 28 March 1985), 558 kHz (after Laser 558 closed) and later 819 kHz. European medium wave channels had been reallocated to multiples of nine. In the evenings on 963 kHz, some alternative music programmes were tried, including the reggae "Jamming 963", and in 1986 and early 1987, a progressive and indie rock programme called Caroline Overdrive.

On 9 August 1985, an official vessel anchored 150 yards (140 m) from the Ross Revenge. The UK Department of Trade and Industry (DTI) put a permanent watch on movements around the Ross Revenge and the MV Communicator, Laser 558's ship. On 3 September 1985 at 00:00 hours the Dioptric Surveyor departed in a storm.

=== Radio Monique ===
From December 1984 the Ross Revenge broadcast Radio Monique, recorded and live Dutch-language programmes of a Dutch music radio production company using the 50 kW transmitter during daytime. They were pop and Europop aimed at the mainstream Dutch audience. Radio Monique was popular throughout Benelux.

In the evenings, Radio Caroline transmitted Dutch and American religious evangelist broadcasters such as Johan Maasbach and Roy Masters on medium wave, and later on short wave, under the name Viewpoint 963/819, or World Mission Radio (WMR) on short wave.

In November 1985, the competing offshore station, Laser 558, closed after electrical problems and Caroline moved from 576 kHz to Laser's 558 kHz frequency, with a Top 40 music format similar to Laser's under the name Caroline 558. When Laser returned as Laser Hot Hits, it used Caroline's former and inferior frequency of 576 kHz.

=== Mast collapse ===
The Territorial Sea Act 1987 extended the UK maritime limit from 3 nautical miles (5.6 km; 3.5 mi) to 12 nautical miles (22 km; 14 mi). To remain in international waters, the ship moved to a new, less-sheltered anchorage. Initially this was a minor inconvenience as the 300-foot (91 m) mast was thought sturdy enough. However, in October 1987, a massive storm hit southern England, causing deaths and severe damage. MV Ross Revenge weathered the storm in the North Sea.

The following day, Caroline was one of few stations in the South East still broadcasting. However, the storm had weakened the mast, which collapsed in another storm later. Caroline returned to the air using a makeshift aerial with a less powerful signal. This was replaced by a twin-mast T-antenna. For several months only one transmitter could be used, leading to the loss of the income-generating Radio Monique, although a substitute Dutch daytime service, Radio 558 (later Radio 819), was eventually established.

=== 1989 Anglo-Dutch raid ===
During mid-August 1989, authorities in several European countries carried out coordinated raids on houses, recording studios and offices believed to be used by Caroline. On 18 August, a British government chartered ship pulled up alongside the Ross Revenge and asked to board to "discuss the future" of the Ross Revenge and the stations operating from it. This request, and one to stop transmissions on 819 kHz (Radio 819), was refused. A request to stop broadcasting on short wave 6214 kHz (World Mission Radio) which interfered with the emergency frequency 6215 kHz was complied with. After several hours the government ship returned to port.

The Netherlands Radio Regulatory Authority executed an armed raid on the Ross Revenge in which equipment was damaged or confiscated. Part of the raid was broadcast live before officials disabled the transmitters. Dutch nationals were arrested and returned to the Netherlands, together with most of the broadcasting equipment. Non-Dutch staff were given the option of staying on the ship or returning to the Netherlands, and most chose to stay on board. Caroline claimed boarding the ship and removal or destruction of equipment was piracy. The Dutch claimed the ship's Panamanian registration had lapsed in 1987, was not under legal protection from any country and that its transmissions breached international regulations which since 1982 had prohibited broadcasting from outside national territories. Several years later some of the seized items were returned to the station.

In 1990 the UK government amended the 1967 anti-offshore law to allow the boarding and silencing of stations in international waters if their signals could be received in the UK, even if their vessels were foreign-registered and operated. Lord Annan, author of the 1977 Report of the Committee on the Future of Broadcasting, spoke in defence of Radio Caroline in the House of Lords at report stage on the Broadcasting Act 1990, saying "Why break a butterfly upon the wheel?" In a 1995 article for the pressure group Charter88, Steve McGann commented:

"Whether Caroline was right to maintain her defiance for so many years is irrelevant. Her story illustrates how uniquely dangerous government regards an independent voice transmitted over unrestricted airwaves and to what ends it will go to silence it."

This legislation remains in force.

=== 1990–1991: After the raid ===
On 1 October 1989, Radio Caroline resumed broadcasting from the Ross Revenge using makeshift equipment and low power, to retain the 558 kHz frequency. Engineer Peter Chicago had hidden transmitter parts during the raid and retuned one 5 kW transmitter, previously used on short-wave, to 558 kHz. Over the following months, Caroline's signal quality improved as transmitting valves were donated and programming returned to normal.

In June 1990, Spectrum Radio, a new multi-ethnic community radio station in London, was officially allocated 558 kHz. Caroline caused more interference to Spectrum than vice versa. Caroline broadcast regular apologies to Spectrum listeners but refused to vacate the channel. Spectrum threatened to sue the Radio Authority, which then allowed Spectrum to temporarily broadcast on 990 kHz alongside 558 kHz. Eventually, Caroline left 558 kHz and moved to 819 kHz. On 5 November 1990, lack of fuel and supplies forced the station to stop transmitting. The final song was "Pilot of the Airwaves" by Charlie Dore.

Although most broadcasting staff left at that time, some remained for a year as caretakers while funding and equipment were sought. The station tried to obtain a licence from a developing country, hoping it might offer protection from the new provisions in the Broadcasting Act 1990 which came into force on 31 December that year.

In November 1991, the ship lost its anchor in a storm and drifted onto the Goodwin Sands in the Channel. The crew (Christian Cobley, Wendy Shepherd, Steve Conway, Stuart Dobson, Neil Gates, and Ricky Jones) was rescued by a Royal Air Force helicopter. The Ross Revenge was salvaged after several attempts and brought into harbour in Dover, ending 27 years of Radio Caroline's unlicensed offshore career.

Radio Caroline
- Broadcast area: UK; Worldwide (Internet); Europe (up to September 2013) (Eutelsat 28A)
- Frequencies: Various Internet streams UPC Ireland: Channel 927; Smallworld Cable: Channel 855 Eutelsat 28A (to 30 September 2013): Freq. 11.426 GHz; Polarisation: Horizontal; Symbol Rate: 27.5; FEC: 2/3

Programming
- Format: AOR (Album/adult oriented)

Ownership
- Owner: Radio Caroline Ltd. and Caroline Support Group (originally called the Ross Revenge Support Group)

History
- First air date: 1999

Links
- Website: www.radiocaroline.co.uk

== Since 1991: Licensed Support Group era ==
Since 1991, the Ross Revenge has been maintained by enthusiasts called the Radio Caroline Support Group, originally the Ross Revenge Support Group. From 2007, the ship was docked at Tilbury, where a volunteer crew repaired and maintained it. The ship has working radio studios, from which both Caroline and BBC Essex have broadcast. On 31 July 2014 the ship was moved to the Blackwater Estuary in Essex.

Former offshore broadcasters who continue on the station are: Roger Mathews, Nigel Harris, Martin Fisher, Marc Jacobs, Johnny Lewis, Doug Wood, Dave Foster, Cliff Osbourne, Chris Pearson, Bob Lawrence, Jeremy Chartham and Ad Roberts. Evangelical programmes and sponsored specialist music are broadcast. During Easter 2008, the station broadcast live for three days from the Ross Revenge, featuring presenters who had worked on the Mi Amigo in the late 1970s: Roger Mathews, Mike Stevens, Bob Lawrence, Brian Martin, Martin Fisher, Cliff Osbourne, Jeremy Chartham, Marc Jacobs, Ad Roberts, Dick Verheul and Kees Borrell.

=== Restricted service licences ===
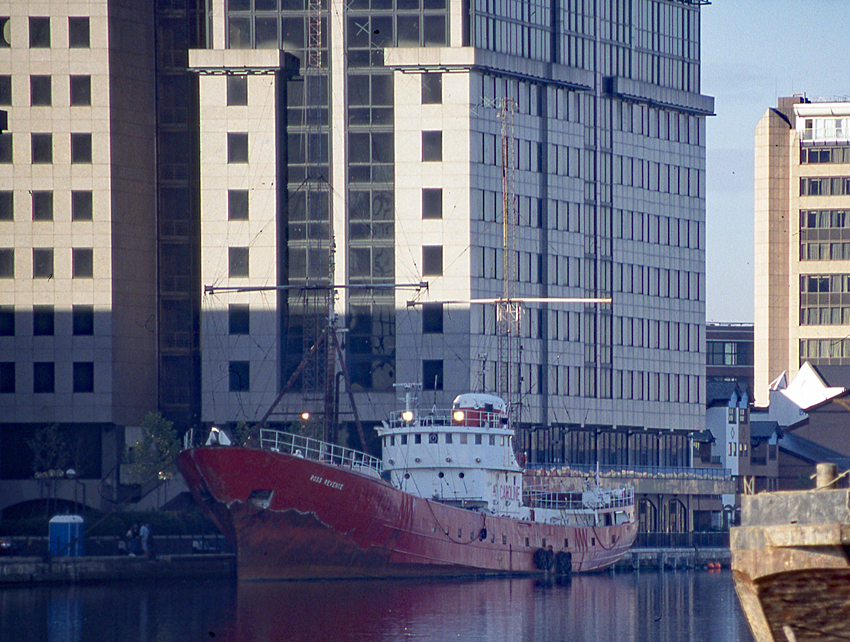
Ross Revenge, Radio Caroline, at Canary Wharf

Radio Caroline was off the air for most of the 1990s, except for occasional low-power broadcasts of one month. Some of these 28-day restricted service licence (RSL) broadcasts took place from the Ross Revenge during the 1990s, with the ship anchored in Dover after her recovery from the Goodwin Sands in 1992, and then off Clacton, in London's Canary Wharf, Southend Pier and off the Isle of Sheppey in Kent.

Following the Goodwins Sands grounding the station carried out two RSL broadcasts in 1992 from the port of Dover. The first commemorating its 28th Anniversary, the second targeted the Medway towns. Caroline DJ Tony Kirk held these first ever licences on behalf of the station. Tony also secured the 'Radio Caroline' name through the UK Patent Office against strong opposition.

At one minute past midnight on 1 October 2001, Caroline returned on 1503 kHz from the LV (Light Vessel) 18 in Harwich harbour. This two-day broadcast featured Phil Mitchell, Paul Dennis, Colin Lamb, John Patrick, Barry James, Steve Cisco and Clive Boutell. The LV 18 was later used by the BBC for Pirate BBC Essex broadcasts.

Another RSL broadcast ran from 7 August until 3 September 2004, with the ship moored at the cruise liner terminal jetty at Tilbury in Essex. It commemorated the 40th anniversary of Radio Caroline and promoted the station's legal internet and satellite programmes. The AM frequency was 1278 kHz and programmes were sent through ISDN landline to Maidstone and via the internet and broadcast on satellite. The supermarket chain Asda and English Heritage were among the backers.

The station has subsequently broadcast on 531 kHz AM from the Ross Revenge during some bank holiday weekends, beginning on 28–31 August 2009 and also within a few days of the 50th anniversary of the ship's first voyage.

=== Satellite and Internet broadcasting ===
Using land-based studios leased in Kent in the late 1990s, the station began broadcasting via satellites Astra 19.2°E and Eutelsat 28A, covering western Europe. These analogue transmissions ended and a full digital service from Astra 28.2°E started in February 2003.

In 2002, Caroline began on WorldSpace satellite radio, continuing until Worldspace went bankrupt and re-organised its operations in 2008. On 12 June 2006, the station bought an EPG slot on Sky channel 0199. This ended on 1 July 2011 after a failure to renegotiate costs with Sky and deciding not to pursue a Freesat EPG slot. Surveys in 2008 and 2010 showed a small percentage listened via Sky, and that satellite listening had dropped by 9% since 2008, while online listening had increased by around 40%. Radio Caroline continued on satellite but required manual tuning.

During 2013, a survey showed a continued move from satellite reception and growth in internet listening. Following negotiations with the service provider, satellite transmissions ended at midnight on 30 September 2013. Programmes were still heard on satellite until the provider replaced the signal with a 1 kHz tone on the morning of 1 October 2013. Internet streaming of Radio Caroline programmes continued.

The Radio Caroline "album" station has been streamed on the Internet for many years, accessible via the station's website, with more streams on various devices. Dedicated apps for listening via Apple iOS and Android devices are also available. In 2011, Radio Caroline joined Radioplayer UK, an internet service formed by the BBC, Global Radio and the Guardian Media Group that supplies a worldwide live feed of UK radio stations.

On 4 May 2015, Radio Caroline started a 24-hour "Flashback" webstream carrying "oldies" music and jingles.

=== Via Manx Radio ===
Since September 2015, Radio Caroline has been broadcasting 'live' for one weekend each month as "Radio Caroline North" (with original DJs and a mixed 1960s, 1970s and 1980s music content and jingles) from its former home the MV Ross Revenge on the Blackwater Estuary in Essex, via Manx Radio's 1368 kHz 20 kW transmitter on the Isle of Man.

=== Radio Caroline at 50 years (1964–2014) ===
From 31 March to 27 April 2014, a Caroline North tribute station, based on the Planet Lightship berthed in the Albert Dock complex on Liverpool's waterfront, broadcast locally on 87.7FM and on the internet. Programmes were presented by current and former DJs from the BBC, ILR, Ireland, Luxembourg, offshore and land-based pirate stations, and other international and freelance backgrounds, including Tony Prince and Emperor Rosko. Original 1960s Caroline North jingles were interspersed with generic Radio Caroline ones.

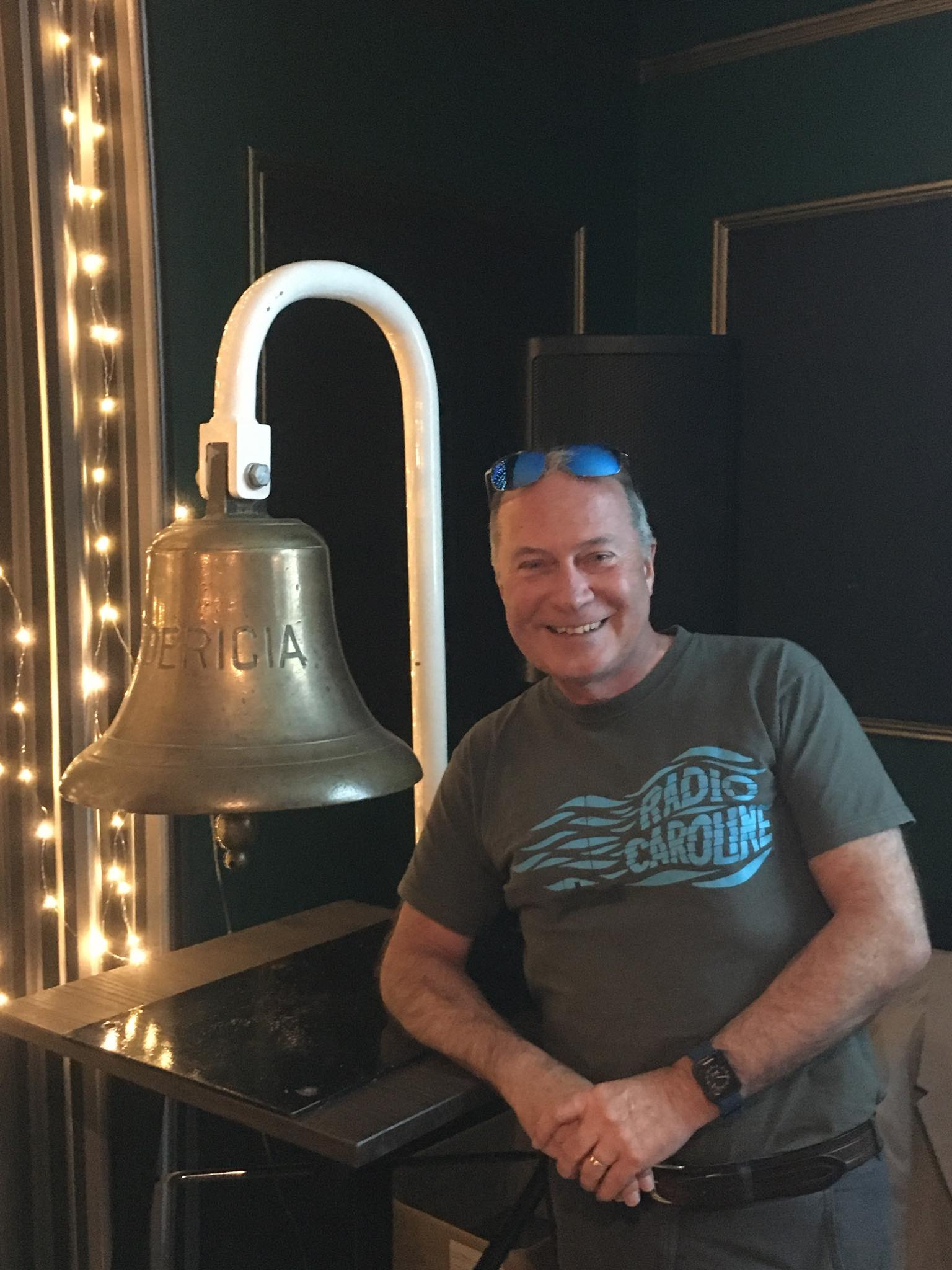
The Radio Caroline Bell. DJ Chris Pearson pictured with the original ship's bell from the MV Fredericia (MV Caroline) displayed as part of the station's 60th anniversary lecture, August 2024.

=== Radio Caroline at 60 years (1964–2024) ===
A special weekend was organised on the Isle of Man to celebrate the 60th anniversary of the station which was held during August 2024. The events centred around Ramsey with several former (and present) Caroline disc jockeys in attendance. In addition, Radio Caroline presenter Chris Pearson made the journey to the pirate radio ship's former anchorage on the Bahama Bank, where he recorded a short video, declaring it was the first time that a transmission had been made from that spot since the cessation of Radio Caroline North broadcasts in 1968.

The commemorations included a two-part talk concerning the origins of Radio Caroline and the development of off-shore radio broadcasts which was held at Ramsey's Mitre Hotel, hosted by Chris Pearson, with guest speakers Andy Wint and Ray Clark.

=== Medium wave campaign ===
In December 2010, Chatham and Aylesford MP Tracey Crouch presented an early day motion to the House of Commons calling for the government regulator Ofcom to allow Radio Caroline to broadcast as a licensed medium wave station to its "traditional heartland of the south east".

The full text of the EDM is:

That this House expresses its disappointment that, having pioneered commercial radio in the UK and for the past decade being a fully licensed broadcaster, Radio Caroline, a cornerstone of British radio history, has been denied by OFCOM the opportunity to secure a medium wave frequency from which to broadcast; regrets that as a result its devoted listeners are confined to listening to Radio Caroline via the internet and unable to enjoy its musical offerings in transit; and calls on OFCOM to exhaust all avenues in making the provisions available for Radio Caroline to celebrate its 50th birthday in 2014 by broadcasting on a medium wave frequency which, it appears, is unwanted by both BBC and commercial operators as a broadcast platform."

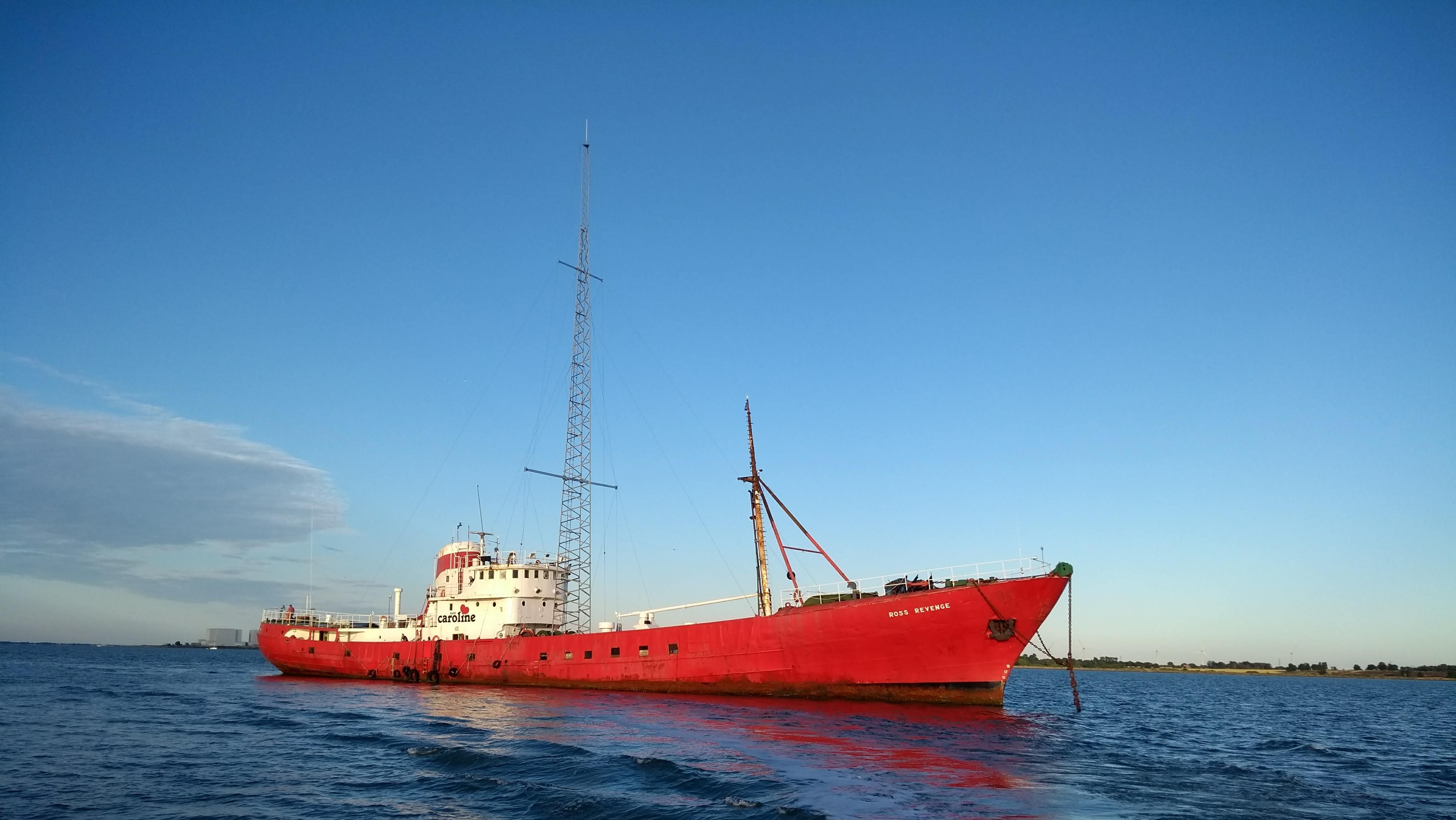
Ross Revenge in the Blackwater Estuary, 2018

On 22 May 2017, Ofcom awarded the station a community licence to broadcast to Suffolk and north Essex on 648 kHz with a power of 1 kW.

On 11 November 2017, test transmissions commenced from an omni-directional mast (formerly used by the BBC World Service) at Orford Ness, Suffolk.

On 9 September 2017 a stone was unveiled in Felixstowe to commemorate Radio Caroline.

Commercial programming commenced at noon on 22 December 2017, with a signal that could be heard as far afield as Southampton, Birmingham, Glasgow and in large parts of The Netherlands and Belgium.

On 3 August 2021, Ofcom announced that it had granted a power increase to combat human-made noise and interference, and to extend the coverage area to include Suffolk, northern parts of Essex, and parts of Kent and East Sussex. On 24 November 2021 a new transmitter was installed with an effective radiated power of 4 kW. In March 2023 a solar PV array was installed at the Orford Ness transmitter site, providing all of the power required for the transmitter in sunny conditions. In April 2023 an application was submitted to Ofcom to increase the effective radiated power to 16 kW but this has apparently been rejected at present.

=== Death of founder ===
Radio Caroline's founder, Ronan O'Rahilly, was diagnosed with vascular dementia in 2013; his death aged 79 on 20 April 2020 was announced by Radio Caroline.

=== Accidental announcement of the death of Charles III ===
On 19 May 2026, the station mistakenly announced that Charles III had died. The station apologised for the incident, and said that it was due to computer error.

== Caroline Community Radio / Caroline Coastal ==
In October 2020, a new station using the Caroline name and logo launched in Burnham-on-Crouch, broadcasting to the Maldon District of Essex on 94.7 MHz FM. The station, owned by St Peters Studio and Community Radio Limited, has not only licensed the name from Radio Caroline, but has also got technical support and programming from the station, who have their own community radio licences in the south, south east and in East Anglia on 648AM (with Radio Caroline also found on DAB in a number of British cities, plus DAB+ in Cambridge). Caroline Community Radio was relaunched as Caroline Coastal on 20 April 2024 with an additional FM frequency of 104.7 MHz.

== International operations ==
=== The Netherlands ===
In January 2002, a Dutch Caroline fan called Sietse Brouwer launched a Netherlands-based Dutch Radio Caroline in Harlingen, broadcasting on the northern Netherlands cable networks and largely independent of UK Caroline. Brouwer intended to obtain an AM frequency from the Netherlands authorities in 2003 when its medium wave frequencies were reallocated. However, Dutch Caroline failed to secure a high power AM frequency and the cable network service was discontinued because of lack of funds. The Dutch Radio Caroline then changed its name to Radio Waddenzee (nl) for daytime Dutch and German language, and Radio Seagull for nighttime English language broadcasts, and now broadcasts on 1602 kHz every day and on the internet, presenting a progressive rock format. Since November 2009 Radio Seagull can be heard periodically on 558 kHz in London.

=== Spain ===
In Spain, a station broadcast during the summer 2009 on 102.7 MHz in the Costa Blanca from studios in Benidorm.

=== Ireland ===
Radio Caroline used to broadcast in the Republic of Ireland on channel 927 on the UPC Ireland cable service in the main cities of Dublin, Cork, Limerick, Galway, Waterford and Cappoquin, and the County Waterford towns of Lismore and Tallow.

=== New Zealand ===
In Timaru, an NZBC station, originally 3XC, later 3ZC, broadcast as Radio Caroline until 1995. The name was taken from Caroline Bay, a popular recreation area nearby.

In Palmerston, Radio Caroline International, based in Tenerife, Canary Islands, Spain, acquired an AM commercial broadcasting licence in 2008, and was seeking wavelengths in Auckland, Wellington and Christchurch. Daytime programming was leased to a community radio service called Puketapu Radio on 756 kHz.

== See also ==
- Pirate radio in the United Kingdom
- Radio Caroline now on YouTube.
- Relisten Radio Caroline
