= Bob Stewart (radio presenter) =

British radio DJ and announcer (1939–2019)

- Born: 3 July 1939; Liverpool, England
- Died: March 28, 2019 (aged 79)
- Occupation: Radio presenter

Bob Stewart (3 July 1939 – 28 March 2019) was a British radio DJ and announcer, best known for his work at Radio Luxembourg.

== Biography ==
Stewart was born in Liverpool. After national service, his friend Pete Best suggested that he become a DJ. He worked at Radio Caroline, transferring from Caroline South to Caroline North, and adopting a more American-style mid-Atlantic accent because of fears that his Scouse accent might alienate some listeners. In 1969, he joined Radio Luxembourg, and, with a distinctive and powerful voice, became one of the key presenters on the station, sometimes credited as "Baby" Bob Stewart. The station's longest-serving presenter, he remained at Luxembourg for 18 years, and was best known as the host of country music and pop chart shows.

He left Luxembourg in the late 1980s, briefly moving to Dallas, Texas, before returning to Europe. He later presented programmes on Jazz FM, Classic Gold, Radio London and other stations. He also worked as a voiceover artist.

He died on 28 March 2019.
