= Radio Delmare =

- Offshore (International Waters); Netherlands
- Broadcast area: North Sea

Programming
- Language: Dutch
- Format: Pirate radio

History
- First air date: 1978
- Last air date: 1979

Technical information
- Power: 3 kW (intended), a few hundred Watts (actual)

Radio Delmare was a Dutch offshore pirate radio station that operated from 1978 to 1979. The project, led by Gerard van Dam, aimed to revive offshore broadcasting after the shutdown of Radio Veronica and Radio North Sea International. The team acquired the vessel MV "Aegir" in 1977, but faced technical difficulties and government raids. After the vessel's stranding, the station attempted to return in 1979 aboard MV "Martina", but ceased operations after three weeks.

== Preemptive raid ==
The first broadcast was to have been aired on Monday 26 June 1978 but the Dutch Radio Control Office and police, already aware a radio ship was equipped, boarded the ship on Friday, June 23 at the Neherkade in The Hague's Laakkwartier district. They had been alerted by a man who did not want his son to take part in the plans to set sail for the North Sea in the next few days. Equipment was confiscated and the ship was made unseaworthy by taking away its anchor and steering wheel.

== International waters ==
The enthusiasts bribed a lockmaster to slip away to the Rijn-Schiekanaal, sailing into open waters with food, oil and other provisions. In early July they entered the harbour at Maassluis, near Rotterdam with the name of the ship changed to "Flip". Two weeks later they sailed to Ostend and brought on board two Marconi transmitters formerly used by the Belgian colonial army in the Congo. Each of the transmitters had 3 kW of power. Damage during installation limited them to a few hundred Watts, and also the radio crystals were missing, which caused a very unstable frequency output with an unusual broad bandwidth providing a high spectral amplitude modulation. The studio contained two Revox A77 reel recorders, four FTM-spotmasters, two Thorens turntables, two AKG microphones and a mixer.

== Broadcasting ==
The station name changed to Radio Delmare with the theme tune "The Eve Of The War" by Jeff Wayne. Over 2000 listener reports in total were claimed from coastal and inland areas around the Netherlands and Belgium. The station aired old tapes from Radio Caroline and some non-stop music. These were live but did not contain much speech. The disc jockey for the first hour was René de Leeuw. The MV Aegir became stranded on 11 September 1978 as the improvised anchor failed at the first Force 6 wind of the season. During the scrapping of her wreck spare parts were gathered for the MV Mi Amigo on which it was planned to resume broadcasts of Radio Delmare. The MV Mi Amigo board technicians received a saved and badly needed second generator from Gerard van Dam, owner of the MV Aegir as well as the MV Aegir and the newly accessed vessel MV Scheveningen 54, which was for the time being used as a tender ship. Ronan O'Rahilly, operator of Radio Caroline on board of the MV Mi Amigo, however, refused to give up historical rights to the ship, so Van Dam had to change plans to revive Radio Delmare and the MV Martina was bought to be equipped as its next offshore radio ship. It broadcast for a three-week period during the summer of 1979.
