= Andy Archer (radio presenter) =

English radio presenter

Andy Archer (born Anthony Andrew Dawson) is an English radio presenter, best known for his work on pirate radio stations in the United Kingdom in the 1960s and 1970s. He later worked for Independent Local Radio and BBC Local Radio.

He was born in Terrington St Clement in Norfolk, on 22 January 1946. He had a brief stint as a presenter on the pirate station Radio City in 1965, but had already signed-up to join the Royal Air Force, and left the station after just one week. He bought himself out of the RAF after two years, and in 1967 joined Radio Caroline, remaining as a presenter until the station shut down the following year.

He presented on Radio North Sea International in 1970 and 1971, and then returned to Radio Caroline when it resumed broadcasting in 1972. In 1975 he moved to on-shore broadcasting when he joined Radio Orwell, broadcasting from Ipswich in Suffolk, where he was the drive time presenter. He was an extremely popular presenter in the local area during his time at Orwell. During this time he also worked as a continuity announcer for Tyne Tees Television and Television South West. He subsequently worked for several commercial stations, including DevonAir, Centre Radio, County Sound and Ireland's Radio Nova and Radio ERI. At Nova, he was the programme director. In the 1980s he also returned to working for Radio Caroline and later Radio Orwell for periods, before in 1990 becoming programme controller at Invicta Supergold.

In 1996, Archer made the move to working for the BBC, presenting programmes for BBC Radio Suffolk. The following year he moved to its sister station BBC Radio Norfolk, where he presented shows such as The Morning Mix and later, from 2002, Drive Live. In 2003 he returned to commercial radio, presenting a mid-morning programme for North Norfolk Radio.

Archer is credited with having pioneered the use of the word "anorak" as a lexical description for an obsessive fan, using the term for fans of offshore radio in the early 1970s, who chartered boats to come out to sea to visit the radio ships.
