= Samantha Dubois =

Ground breaking Radio Caroline presenter

Samantha Dubois in April 1974 onboard tender heading out to Radio Caroline vessel Mi Amigo

Samantha Dubois (15 January 1955 – 1 October 1992) was a radio presenter on Radio Caroline during the 1970s and again in 1984.

She was born Ellen Kraal in the Netherlands but learnt to speak English from time spent growing up in New Zealand in the 1960s. She joined Radio Caroline originally as the girlfriend of Peter Chicago, the transmitter engineer and occasional broadcaster, and at first, she helped out with the cooking on the radio ship Mi Amigo.

She was first heard on the air on 6 February 1973, making an announcement in Dutch on Norman Barrington's show, using her real name. Her first programme was on 3 March 1973, when she called herself 'Ellen the cook'.

In 1974, she began working as a regular broadcaster in the 3am-6am slot, using the name 'Samantha Dubois' and later just 'Samantha'. Later in her career she also presented late night and some daytime shows. Her intervals on board dated from 6 March to 10 May 1974, from 16 December 1975 to September 1976, a short period from 24 February to 24 March 1977, and finally from 21 September to 17 October 1978. According to tabulations from the late Buster Pearson of Monitor magazine, she was on the air for a total of 792 hours.

On 12 January 1977, she was put on trial and was fined by a Dutch court for her involvement with the station. Despite this, she returned to Radio Caroline in February of that year.

She made her final broadcast, from the Mi Amigo, on 17 October 1978. After she left the station, she later got married and moved to New Zealand. She did, however, return to the station in 1984, from 14 September to 10 November, during which she added another 147 hours 'live on the air' from the radio ship Ross Revenge.

After leaving Radio Caroline for the last time, she lived in The Hague, before returning to New Zealand to have a child named Luke on 18 September 1991. She then later died from liver cancer on 1 October 1992, and is buried at North Shore Memorial Park in Auckland.

Samantha Dubois began broadcasting on Radio Caroline at a time when there were still few female broadcasters, and there is no doubt that she laid the groundwork for others to follow, such as Caroline Martin, who presented on Radio Caroline in the 1980s. She remains much admired and missed by her former colleagues and her listeners.

Due to the late night/early morning timing of many of her programmes, the number of recordings of her broadcasts are limited. However, recordings have begun to emerge in the last few years.

A CD entitled The Late Samantha Dubois is now available from offshore radio websites.
