= Spangles Muldoon =

Spangles Muldoon (5 October 1946 – 29 February 2008), real name Chris Cary, was a radio broadcaster best known for his work on British offshore radio stations, Radio Caroline and Radio North Sea International. He died in February 2008 aged 61, after suffering from a stroke.

Cary was a key figure in the British rock music radio revolution of the 1960s. He was one of the DJs who broadcast from the offshore pirate radio ship, Radio Caroline in 1967 and 1968. At its peak, the station claimed 23 million listeners. In the 1970s, Cary was a DJ on RNI, before a stint at Radio Luxembourg. He operated Compshop in North London in the late 1970s.

Around this time, he went to Ireland with Robbie Robinson (a.k.a. Robbie Dale) and DJ Roger Swann to set up Sunshine Radio with the stated objective of broadcasting to holidaymakers in Majorca. The cars they travelled in (a Lincoln Continental and a Mercedes) contained much of the broadcasting equipment that they intended to fit to an ancient wooden-keeled sloop. Unfortunately, the Mercedes broke down on the M1, but the Lincoln Continental made it to Larne where the "radio ship" was being prepared. Swann left after 10 days or so and ended up working on the Voice of Peace station, but the pirate radio ship didn't make any further than Dublin. The final fate of the ship is unknown but rumour has it that some broadcasts to the Irish Republic were made from the vessel.

In 1981, Cary returned to Ireland to set up Radio Nova (Ireland), which was the most successful commercial Top 40 radio station in Ireland to date, in terms of professionalism and listenership. Many of the programming philosophies on Nova were based around Los Angeles station, KIIS-FM.

His son Nico Cary is a British triathlete and entrepreneur.
