= Caroline Overdrive =

Caroline Overdrive was a programming strand which ran on British radio station Radio Caroline in 1986–1987.

== Background ==
After Caroline's return to the air in 1983 from the MV Ross Revenge, the station played an eclectic mixture of chart hits, album tracks and golden oldies, but by 1985 the station faced competition from the aggressively commercial Laser 558. Caroline began transmitting a second service on 576 kHz, close to Laser's frequency, broadcasting a more conventional singles-oriented format, while its main frequency of 963 kHz carried the Dutch station Radio Monique by day and sponsored religious programming in the evening under the name "Viewpoint 963". After Laser closed in November 1985 Caroline took over the 558 kHz slot.

During 1985 the 963 kHz transmitter had been used for some nighttime music shows after the end of Viewpoint, most notably Jamming 963, a short run of reggae programmes.

== Overdrive ==
On January 1, 1986 DJ Tom Anderson, who had been heavily involved with the station's 1983 relaunch, began Caroline Overdrive on the 963 kHz transmitter after the end of Viewpoint. Overdrive carried a wide selection of "alternative" music, the only apparent rule being that it should provide an alternative to the mainstream programming on 558. Presentation was uncluttered, with a minimum of DJ chatter and few jingles. One critic described the service as being similar to a John Peel show except that it ran all night.

Increases in the number of religious programmes meant that as the year progressed the start of Overdrive was pushed back from 8 p.m. to 9 and later 9:30.

Towards the end of 1986 a combination of transmitter maintenance and lack of direct involvement by Anderson meant that Overdrive was frequently off the air. The last Overdrive programme was broadcast in February 1987 under the title "Testing 963", parodying the newly relaunched Laser's test broadcasts. After this no further alternative programming was heard on 963.
