= Radio Nord =

Baltic Sea (offshore); Sweden
- Broadcast area: Sweden, southern Finland, eastern Europe
- Frequency: Medium wave
- Branding: Radio Nord

Programming
- Language: Swedish
- Format: Top 40, pop music, commercials

Ownership
- Owner: Gordon McLendon, Clint Murchison Jr., others

History
- First air date: 8 March 1961
- Last air date: 30 June 1962
- Former names: MV Bon Jour, later MV Magda Maria

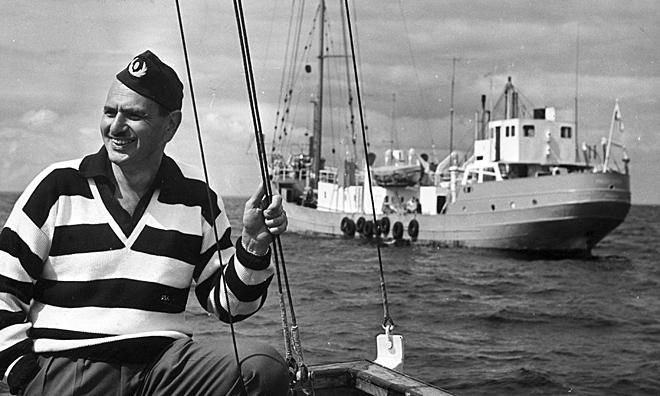

Radio Nord was a Swedish offshore commercial station that operated briefly from 8 March 1961 to 30 June 1962 from a ship anchored in international waters of the Baltic Sea off Stockholm, Sweden. While the station was dubbed as a pirate radio station, its actual operation took place within the laws of the day and its offices were located in the heart of Stockholm. Its ownership was vested in a company which had been specifically formed by Texas broadcasting and political interests that included Gordon McLendon and Clint Murchison Jr.

== Ship and station ==
On 31 May 1960 the hold of the MV Olga was converted into studios, a transmitter room and crew quarters at the Norder Werft shipyard in Hamburg, West Germany. Due to laws restricting work on the unlicensed installation of broadcasting equipment at the port, the ship, now renamed Bon Jour, was taken to the free port at Langelinie, Copenhagen. A 125-foot mast to support the broadcasting antenna coupled to two 10,000 watts LTV-Continental Electronics (CEMCO) transmitters was then assembled and installed. The transmitters had been flown in from the factory at Dallas, Texas in six thousand parts. The original antenna design called for fore and aft masts with a horizontal antenna slung between (as on Radio Veronica's ship Borkum Riff). However, final design was an inverted V supported by the single foremast, forming a folded unipole antenna. This design was chosen because the mast was too short to support a conventional quarter-wave antenna.

When the vessel finally arrived off the coast of Sweden in early 1961 a series of technical problems forced the radio ship Bon Jour to continue finding safe haven in order to carry out repairs. On 4 February 1961 the radio ship left the Finnboda shipyard in Stockholm and sailed for Ornö for further on air tests, but these were met by a storm two days later and the ship had to return to port. Following more repairs the Bon Jour left port on 21 February and sailed for her broadcasting anchorage. More technical problems forced her to return to Finnboda and was not able to return to her anchorage until 1 March 1961.

On 2 March 1961 the Swedish Parliament passed laws that allowed authorities to seize her broadcasting equipment should she return to a Swedish port again, while pressuring Nicaragua to withdraw her registration. The owners of Radio Nord promptly renamed the vessel MV Magda Maria and registered her in Panama.

On 2 December 1961, the Magda Maria became victim of another storm that lasted for days. On 6 December she lost her anchor, ceased transmissions when it appeared that the antenna might collapse. The vessel then put into port of Sandhamn but the new law was not applied against her since her arrival had been forced by emergency to save the vessel from becoming a nautical wreck. Repairs were carried out and she left port for her anchorage on 8 December.

Following the passage of a new Swedish law barring the sale of advertising on the station, Radio Nord ceased broadcasting at the end of June 1962, one month before the law was due to come into effect. On 4 July the MV Magda Maria sailed for Ferrol, Spain and docked on 2 August where further repairs were carried out under the new name of MV Mi Amigo. Later became Radio Atlanta in 1964 at the Essex Coast England to become Radio Caroline South in the same year

== Programming format ==
The station was heard in Sweden, southern Finland and parts of eastern Europe. Radio Nord programming was inspired by Gordon McLendon of Dallas who had developed many radio formats. While he was not the inventor of top 40 radio, he is looked upon as an owner of American radio stations who then somewhat refined it. Part of the McLendon style was to use jingles and they became a part of Radio Nord programming in addition to many commercials for products and services that had links to American companies.

When Radio Nord closed down for the last time her transmissions concluded with a specially-edited jingle montage.

== Further history of the ship ==
In March 2011, the Swedish Post and Telecom Agency approved an application to operate a special temporary radio station marking the 50th anniversary of the start of the offshore broadcaster Radio Nord, on 1512 and 6060 kHz, from a transmitter at Kvarnberget, Vallentuna. A test transmission featuring the original station's opening program was transmitted on the 8th (the exact anniversary).

== See also ==
- Gordon McLendon
- Clint Murchison, Jr.
