= Robbie Dale =

British DJ (1940–2021)

- Born: Robbie Robinson; 21 April 1940; Littleborough, Lancashire, England
- Died: 31 August 2021 (aged 81); Lanzarote, Canary Islands, Spain
- Presenting career
- Stations: Radio Caroline, Radio Veronica, Capital Radio
- Style: Radio DJ
- Country: United Kingdom/ Netherlands

Robbie Robinson (21 April 1940 – 31 August 2021), better known by the name Robbie Dale and nicknamed The Admiral, was a British radio disc jockey who was the chief DJ of Radio Caroline during the 1960s.

== Pirate radio ==
Dale was born in Littleborough, Lancashire, England, in April 1940. He was chief DJ on the offshore pirate radio ship Radio Caroline. Dale was one of the DJs on Radio Caroline on 14 August 1967 with Johnnie Walker, when the Marine Broadcasting Offences Act 1967 came into effect. At its peak, the station had 23 million listeners.

After the closedown of Radio Caroline he worked for the Dutch pirate radio ship Radio Veronica from May 1968 to August 1969, and then worked on the Dutch broadcaster TROS, where he did a regular radio show on Hilversum 3 on Thursday afternoons.

He was given the nickname "The Admiral" by Dave Lee Travis because he reportedly liked the boat to be "shipshape"; he sometimes wore an admiral's uniform while doing his show.

He was involved in popular music in other ways. He recorded a single, "Soul Mama" for Pink Elephant records, released in 1969. He also wrote the 1969 single "Soul Entertainer" for the funk-soul band Respect.

Dale is a member of the Pirate Radio Hall of Fame.

== Later life ==
During the 1970s, Dale retired from broadcasting, ran a contract cleaning business in London, and one of his major contracts was with Capital Radio. In 1980, he started-up and successfully ran Sunshine 101 in Dublin. It became one of the most popular pirate radio stations in the Republic of Ireland, until unlicensed radio was outlawed in the country in 1989.

Dale then moved from Dublin to Lanzarote, Canary Islands, where he operated a holiday apartment complex.

Dale died from dementia complications in Lanzarote on 31 August 2021, at the age of 81.
