= Tom Lodge =

English writer and radio broadcaster (1936–2012)

Thomas Odoard Marshall Lodge (16 April 1936 – 25 March 2012) was an English writer and radio broadcaster.

He was a prominent figure in British radio of the 1960s. He was a disc jockey on pirate-radio station Radio Caroline.

== Early life ==
Tom Lodge was born on 16 April 1936 at Forest Green, Surrey. He was the son of the writer Oliver W. F. Lodge and his second wife, Diana. His grandfather was the physicist Sir Oliver Lodge.

When World War II broke out, his family left England for the United States, where his father taught English literature. At the end of the war, they returned to England and lived near Painswick, Gloucestershire.

Lodge was educated at Bedales School, England, where he developed his interest in music. He took lessons on the violin and the clarinet, taught himself the guitar and mouth organ, and played the stand-up bass in a four-piece skiffle band called the "Top Flat Ramblers".

When he was eighteen, Lodge travelled to Canada to Hay River, Northwest Territories, and worked in commercial fishing on the Great Slave Lake. While fishing with a colleague, he was blown out into open waters on an ice floe. His companion died, but Lodge was rescued by some trappers. He described his adventures in his first book, Beyond the Great Slave Lake (published by Cassell in 1957 and E.P. Dutton in 1958).

In 1956, he returned to England and married Jeanine Arpourettes in the following year.

They had three sons: Tom Jr. (b. 1959, Yellowknife, North West Territories, Canada), Brodie (b. 1961, London, England), and Lionel (b. 1962, Inverness, Scotland). All three sons are involved in music, being significantly influenced and educated by their father. Tom Jr. is in his eleventh year of a weekly Sunday (9–11 p.m. UK time) music show (originating as "the two Toms" with Tom Sr.) which Tom Jr uploads from Canada to Radio Caroline in the UK. Radio Caroline turned fifty in March 2014. Tom also has three grandchildren, and three great-grandchildren.

== Broadcasting ==
In the late 1950s, Lodge moved to Yellowknife, where he worked in a gold mine until he joined the Canadian Broadcasting Corporation as an announcer.

On 27 May 1959, a son, Tom Lodge Jr., was born. Tom Jr. is a presenter on Radio Caroline.

In 1960, Lodge became the CBC manager for a new radio station, CBXH, in Fort Smith, Northwest Territories, until he returned to England as a CBC correspondent.

In 1964, Lodge joined England's first offshore pirate radio station, Radio Caroline, as disc jockey and programme director. His book The Ship That Rocked the World describes his time there. The 2009 comedy-drama film Pirate Radio is based on the book.

After the outlawing of the pirate radio ships in by the Marine Broadcasting Offences Act 1967, he worked as a disc jockey for the BBC's newly created Radio 1.

In 1968, Lodge became a disc jockey on CHLO-AM, St. Thomas, Ontario, Canada, where he continued to build his reputation for breaking new music.

In 1973, he founded a creative program at Fanshawe College, in London, Ontario, Canada, called "Creative Electronics", which after three years he made into Music Industry Arts, a training program for recording engineers and record producers.

After retiring from radio, Tom Sr. continued to contribute occasionally to his son Tom Jr.'s weekly programme on Radio Caroline. He also recorded two final programmes for the station. The first explored his personal history with Radio Caroline and the music associated with the station, while the second examined the history and development of the lead guitar, including influential guitar solos in rock and roll. Both programmes were subsequently made available through the Radio Caroline web shop.

== Umi ==
In 1975, in California, Lodge began practising Zen. In January 1998, his Master changed his name to Umi and he began guiding people in Zen. He had a zendo, "Stillpoint Zen Community", near Santa Cruz, California.

== Bibliography ==
- Beyond the Great Slave Lake (Cassell, 1958)
- Beyond the Great Slave Lake (E. P. Dutton, 1959)
- Success Without Goals (Lloyds Mayfair Group, 1992)
- Circles, Tom Lodge Becoming Umi (Lloyds Mayfair Group, 1993)
- Footprints in the Snow (Umi Foundation, 2000)
- The River and the Raven (Umi Foundation, 2002)
- Enlightenment Guaranteed (Umi Foundation, 2002)
- The Radio Caroline Story (Umi Foundation, 2002)
- The Ship That Rocked the World, How Radio Caroline Defied the Establishment, Launched the British Invasion and Made the Planet Safe for Rock and Roll (Bartleby Press 2010)
- God Is a Dancer (Umi Foundation, 2007)
- The Diamond Sutra with Umi (Church of Consciousness, 2008)
