= Radio Atlanta =

Offshore (North Sea); United Kingdom
- Broadcast area: North Sea, 3.5 miles off Frinton-on-Sea, Essex
- Frequency: 1493 kHz (201 meters)

Programming
- Language: English
- Format: Commercial radio
- Affiliations: Radio Caroline South (after merger)

Ownership
- Owner: Gordon McLendon, Clint Murchison
- Operator: Project Atlanta, Ltd.

History
- First air date: 12 May 1964
- Last air date: 2 July 1964

Technical information
- Power: 10 kW (AM)

Radio Atlanta was an offshore commercial station that operated briefly from 12 May 1964 to 2 July 1964 from a ship anchored in the North Sea, three and a half miles off Frinton-on-Sea, Essex, England. The radio broadcasting vessel was owned, at that time, by Gordon McLendon and Clint Murchison of Dallas, Texas, and leased to a British company for day-to-day operations. It was named after Atlanta, Texas,

While the station was dubbed as a pirate radio station, its actual operation took place within the laws of the day and its offices were located in the heart of the Soho district of London. Its radio advertising sales management was vested in company known as Project Atlanta, Ltd., which had been specifically formed by British political, banking, theatrical and music publishing interests.

== Origin of the station ==
The on air studio and 10,000 watt AM transmitter of Radio Atlanta were located on board the motor vessel MV Mi Amigo. This radio ship had been originally converted and outfitted (under the name MV Bon Jour) as the home of the offshore Swedish station Radio Nord by the radio interests of Gordon McLendon and financed by fellow Texan Clint Murchison. Jack Kotschack had previously represented the sales operation in Stockholm, Sweden as Radio Nord, and Australian music publisher Allan Crawford represented the sales and programming operation in Britain under the new name of Radio Atlanta. Crawford was doing business and residing in England.

== Station history ==
Following the closure of Radio Nord by Swedish legislation, the radio ship sailed for Galveston, Texas, where she remained for a year until 1963. The vessel was stripped of its broadcasting equipment. This meant that when Crawford finally managed to acquire the ship, it was necessary to refit it as a radio station. Crawford's backers included his friend the translator Dorothy Black.

Meanwhile, Ronan O'Rahilly had acquired the Mclendon business plan from Crawford and showed it to associates of Jocelyn Stevens, and used the blueprint to create another station called Radio Caroline. O'Rahilly offered Crawford the use of the O'Rahilly family port at Greenore in Ireland in exchange for use of the Crawford recording studio for the venture represented by O'Rahilly.

Both Crawford and O'Rahilly admit that, while the two ships were being fitted out, numerous acts of mutual sabotage occurred, with each company doing its best to delay the other's launch. The Mi Amigo was first to leave Greenore, but problems with the rigging supporting its antenna mast meant that the ship had to put in at Falmouth for repairs, and because of this delay Radio Caroline went on air first, on 28 March 1964.

Radio Atlanta began test broadcasts on 12 May 1964. Its earliest tests were on 1520 kHz (197 metres), the same frequency as Caroline, after Caroline's evening closedown and were clearly intended to steal Caroline's audience. Official programming began shortly afterward on 1493 kHz (201 metres). The DJs never referred to the Mi Amigo by name, but as "The Good Ship Radio Atlanta".

The majority of Radio Atlanta's programmes were pre-recorded in London and were rushed out to the ship for transmission on the same day or the next. On occasions when bad weather made this impossible, the onboard DJs had to present more live shows.

Radio Atlanta remained on the air for less than 2 months, until 2 July 1964. Audiences and advertising revenue had not lived up to expectations, and Crawford was reluctantly forced to join with O'Rahilly's Caroline, and become Radio Caroline South. Crawford remained in charge of Caroline South until late 1965, when he left and O'Rahilly took overall control of both Carolines.

== After Atlanta ==
Crawford's "Project Atlanta" remained in control of Caroline South until late 1965, but the station continued to lose ground as new stations came on the air, notably Radio London. Eventually Crawford pulled out, leaving O'Rahilly in charge of both Caroline ships, and Caroline South's audience figures improved under its new management.

== See also ==
- Clint Murchison - Texas entrepreneur and promoter of U.S. political interests
- Gordon McLendon - U.S. broadcasting pioneer from Texas who created Radio Nord
- Radio Nord - Swedish offshore radio ship that became the new home of Radio Atlanta
- Ronan O'Rahilly - Owner of Radio Caroline
- Oliver Smedley - British Army Major, Liberal Party member and promoter of Radio Atlanta
- Radio Caroline - Radio Atlanta became Radio Caroline South.
