= Ronan O'Rahilly =

Irish businessman (1940–2020)

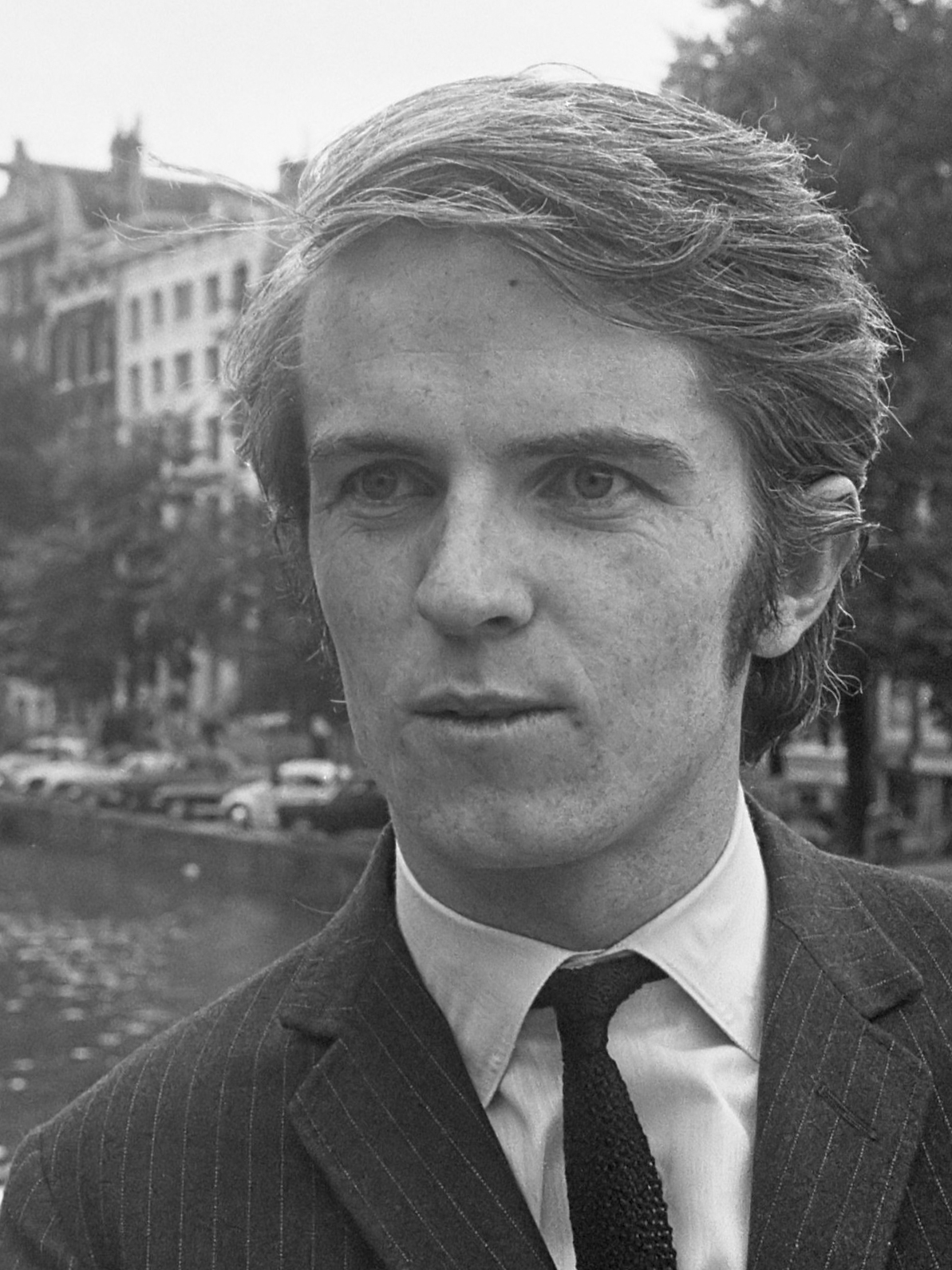
- O'Rahilly in 1967
- Born: Aodogán Ronan O'Rahilly; 21 May 1940; Dublin, Ireland
- Died: 20 April 2020 (aged 79); Carlingford, County Louth, Ireland
- Occupation: Businessman
- Known for: Founding Radio Caroline

Aodogán Ronan O'Rahilly (21 May 1940 – 20 April 2020) was an Irish businessman best known for creating the offshore radio station Radio Caroline. He was also the manager of George Lazenby, who played James Bond in one film.

== Biography ==
=== Background ===
O'Rahilly was born in Dublin, the third of five children. His parents owned the private port at Greenore, County Louth, on Carlingford Lough. His grandfather Michael O'Rahilly (The O'Rahilly) was an important figure in the quest for the independence of Ireland, a leader in the Easter Rising, who died in the fighting in Dublin in April 1916.

O'Rahilly described himself as a rebel who had been expelled from school seven times. He started living in London at the age of 17.

=== London club scene ===
Before he founded Radio Caroline, O'Rahilly started training in method acting in London, frequented nightclubs and became acquainted with such entertainment industry figures as Giorgio Gomelsky and Simon Dee. He then ran a night club, the Scene, off Great Windmill Street in Soho, London, where in 1963 the Rolling Stones played, amongst others including Zoot Money and Chris Farlowe. He became the manager of musicians, such as Alexis Korner and Georgie Fame, and helped to persuade the Animals to move to London. Alan Price said of O'Rahilly: "Ronan knew how things were done; he was very hip, he really fancied himself, but he had a lot of 'get up and go' and verve. He helped to launch the Animals".

He tried to persuade radio stations to play a promotional acetate record by Georgie Fame, a practice that was almost unheard of at the time. He took the record to the BBC to try to get it played, and discovered that the record industry was dominated by EMI and Decca. He then tried to get it played on Radio Luxembourg and again found that the shows were "owned" by major labels EMI, Decca, Pye and Philips. They were essentially "payola" shows, featuring only music from labels willing and able to pay for them to be played.

=== Radio Caroline ===
He then set about creating the pirate radio station Radio Caroline, which began broadcasting in 1964 from a ship, the MV Caroline, anchored in international waters off the coast of Essex, eastern England. The idea for the station was based partly on a plan by Australian music publisher Allan Crawford (who had spent almost two years planning the launch of Radio Atlanta) and also on Radio Veronica, which had been broadcasting off the Netherlands since 1960. Radio Caroline was largely funded by financier John Sheffield (great uncle of Samantha Cameron) and Carl Ross (creator of the Ross fishery frozen food business and grandfather of David Ross, the co-founder of Carphone Warehouse) and publisher Jocelyn Stevens. In 1965, the Caroline and Atlanta companies merged under the Radio Caroline name, their two ships giving greater coverage of the United Kingdom.

Broadcasts ceased in 1968, the ships' operations having been hampered by UK legislation in the previous year, which also saw new competition from the BBC's Radio 1. O'Rahilly was involved in the reappearance of Radio Caroline in several forms during the 1970s and 1980s.

=== Other initiatives ===
In 1966, O'Rahilly gave businessman Phil Solomon a share in Radio Caroline, and with him set up Major Minor Records, whose acts including The Dubliners and David McWilliams were then promoted by the station. O'Rahilly also attempted, but failed, to set up a Caroline TV station.

In 1968, he became involved in the production of a number of films, including as executive producer on the Marianne Faithfull film The Girl on a Motorcycle and on Two Virgins featuring John Lennon and Yoko Ono.

O'Rahilly became manager of the Australian model-turned-actor George Lazenby, who played James Bond in one film. During production of the 1969 James Bond film On Her Majesty's Secret Service, O'Rahilly talked Lazenby into refusing a seven-film Bond contract on grounds that the James Bond character was out of touch with the times, and would not successfully continue into the 1970s. Of this advice, Roger Moore wrote in his autobiography, My Word Is My Bond, "George took some bad advice [...], and that he himself would never last beyond one more film in the role. He decided to get out while his fame was riding high and refused to sign the seven-picture contract Cubby and Harry waved under his nose. I knew George then and have met him many times since. He admits he made a mistake." O'Rahilly also appeared in Lazenby's film Universal Soldier where both men were credited as executive producers.

O'Rahilly briefly managed the American rock band MC5 in the early 1970s. Later in the decade, claiming that people "found it easier to talk about hate than love", and influenced by spiritual leader Ram Dass, he developed the philosophy of "Loving Awareness", which was then heavily promoted on Caroline. In 1976 an album of songs based on the concept was recorded by the Loving Awareness Band, a group assembled by O'Rahilly for the purpose. Several members of the band went on to form the Blockheads.

=== Later life ===
In December 2007, O'Rahilly was inducted as a Fellow of the Radio Academy. O'Rahilly was inducted into the Hall Of Fame at the PPI Radio Awards, held at the Lyrath Hotel, Kilkenny, Ireland, on 12 October 2012.

In 2012, O'Rahilly was diagnosed with vascular dementia and returned to live in County Louth, Ireland, in sight of the port of Greenore where Radio Caroline was "born" in the 1960s. He lived in a nursing home at Carlingford. He died on 20 April 2020, at the age of 79.

== Personal life ==
O'Rahilly married Catherine Hamilton-Davies in 1993. After his dementia diagnosis, he lived in County Louth with Inês Rocha Trindade.
