= Screaming Lord Sutch =

English satirical politician (1940–1999)

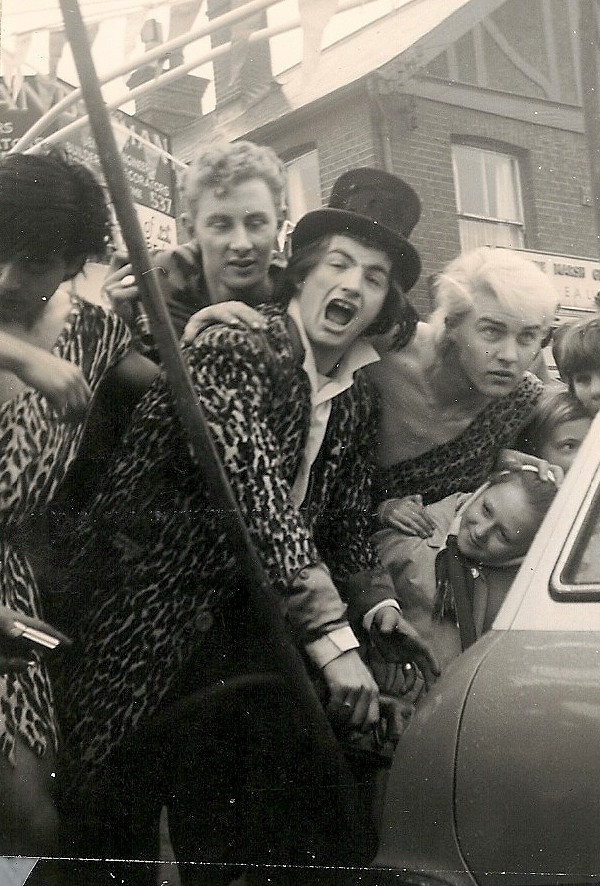
- Sutch (centre, with top hat) c. 1967

Background information
- Also known as: Lord Sutch; Screaming Lord Sutch, 3rd Earl of Harrow
- Born: David Edward Sutch; 10 November 1940; Hampstead, London, England
- Died: 16 June 1999 (aged 58) West Harrow, Greater London, England
- Cause of death: Suicide by hanging
- Genres: Rock and roll; psychedelic rock; shock rock
- Occupations: Musician; perennial candidate

Leader of the Official Monster Raving Loony Party
- In office 1982 – 16 June 1999
- Deputy: Howling Laud Hope
- Preceded by: Position established
- Succeeded by: Howling Laud Hope and Catmando

Personal details
- Party: Official Monster Raving Loony Party

David Edward Sutch (10 November 1940 – 16 June 1999), known as Screaming Lord Sutch, was an English rock and roll musician and perennial parliamentary candidate.

He was the founder of the Official Monster Raving Loony Party and served as its leader from 1983 to 1999, during which time he stood in numerous parliamentary elections. He holds the record for contesting the most Parliamentary elections: 39 between 1963 and 1997. As a singer, he variously worked with Keith Moon, Jeff Beck, Jimmy Page, Ritchie Blackmore, Charlie Watts, John Bonham, Noel Redding, Mitch Mitchell and Nicky Hopkins, and is known for his recordings with Joe Meek, including "Jack the Ripper" (1963).

== Early life ==
David Edward Sutch was born on 10 December 1940 in Hampstead, London. His father, a policeman, was killed in the Blitz when Sutch was 10 months old. He was raised by his mother, Annie (also known as Nancy), who worked as a cleaner and store clerk. Sutch grew up in Harrow.

== Musical career ==
In the 1960s, inspired by Screamin' Jay Hawkins, he adopted the stage name "Screaming Lord Sutch, 3rd Earl of Harrow", although he had no link whatsoever with the peerage. The British press subsequently took to referring to him as "Screaming Lord Sutch", or simply "Lord Sutch".

During that decade, Screaming Lord Sutch became known for a horror‑themed stage show in which he appeared dressed as Jack the Ripper, anticipating the shock rock theatricality of Arthur Brown and Alice Cooper. Accompanied by his band, the Savages, he would open the performance by emerging from a black coffin (on one occasion he became trapped inside, an incident later parodied in the film Slade in Flame). His other props included knives, daggers, skulls and artificial corpses. Sutch organised themed tours, among them "Sutch and the Roman Empire", for which he and the band dressed as Roman soldiers. The fellow musician Chas McDevitt later claimed that he himself had suggested a Screamin' Jay Hawkins‑style act to Sutch's manager, Paul Lincoln, after seeing Hawkins perform in New York in 1957. McDevitt had contemplated emulating Hawkins by beginning his own act with an emergence from a silk‑lined coffin, but had concluded that he "(didn't have) the personality to carry this off", observing that "no one in this country had heard of Hawkins until the mid‑60s".

Despite what was widely regarded, and what he himself acknowledged, as a limited vocal ability, Sutch released a string of horror‑themed singles during the early to mid‑1960s, the most popular of which was "Jack the Ripper". His single "The Cheat" has been cited as a proto‑psychedelic recording. His early output included recordings produced by the audio innovator Joe Meek.

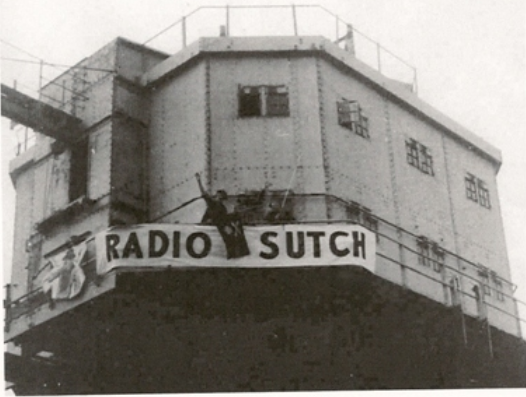
Radio Sutch on a Shivering Sands guntower

In 1963, Sutch and his manager, Reginald Calvert, took possession of the Shivering Sands Army Fort, a Maunsell Fort off Southend, and the following year launched Radio Sutch with the aim of competing with other pirate radio stations such as Radio Caroline. The broadcasts featured music, together with Mandy Rice-Davies reading from Lady Chatterley's Lover. Sutch soon lost interest in the station and sold it to Calvert, after which it was renamed Radio City and continued until the Marine Broadcasting Offences Act took effect in 1967. In 1966, Calvert was shot dead by Oliver Smedley in the course of a financial dispute; Smedley was acquitted on grounds of self-defence.

Around this time, Ritchie Blackmore left the band, and Roger Warwick departed to establish an R&B big band for Freddie Mack.

Sutch's album Lord Sutch and Heavy Friends was named the worst album of all time in a 1998 BBC poll, a distinction it also holds in Colin Larkin's The Top 1000 Albums of All Time.

For the follow‑up, Hands of Jack the Ripper, Sutch gathered a group of British rock celebrities for a concert at the Carshalton Park Rock ’n’ Roll Festival. The performance was recorded—though unbeknown to the musicians—and released to their surprise. Those who appear on the record include Ritchie Blackmore (guitar), Matthew Fisher (keyboards), Carlo Little (drums), Keith Moon (drums), Noel Redding (bass) and Nick Simper (bass).

In 2017, Sutch's song "Flashing Lights" was featured in the Steven Soderbergh film Logan Lucky.

== Political activities ==
In the 1960s, Sutch stood in parliamentary elections, often as representative of the National Teenage Party. His first was in 1963, when he contested the Stratford by-election caused by the resignation of John Profumo. He gained 208 votes. His next was at the 1966 general election when he stood in Harold Wilson's Huyton constituency. Here, he received 585 votes.

He founded the Official Monster Raving Loony Party on 16 June 1982 at the Golden Lion Hotel in Ashburton, Devon, and fought the 1983 Bermondsey by-election. In his career, he contested over 40 elections. He was recognisable at election counts by his flamboyant clothes and top hat. In 1968, he officially added "lord" to his name by deed poll. On 1 October 1985, the deposit paid by candidates was raised from £150 to £500. This did little to deter Sutch, who increased the number of concerts he performed to pay for campaigns. He achieved his highest poll and vote share at Rotherham in 1994 with 1,114 votes and a 4.2 per cent vote share.

At the Bootle by-election in May 1990, he secured more votes than the candidate of the Continuing Social Democratic Party (SDP), led by former Foreign Secretary David Owen. Within days, the SDP dissolved itself. In 1993, when the British National Party gained its first local councillor, Derek Beackon, Sutch pointed out that the Official Monster Raving Loony Party already had six. He contested 39 parliamentary elections – a record number – losing his deposit in all of them.

He appeared as himself in the first episode of ITV comedy The New Statesman, coming second ahead of Labour and the SDP, in the 1987 election which saw Alan B'Stard elected to Parliament.

Adverts in the 1990s for Heineken Pilsener boasted that "Only Heineken can do this". One had Sutch at 10 Downing Street after becoming Prime Minister.

Screaming Lord Sutch actively encouraged young people to take an interest in politics. As founder of the National Teenage Party and later the Official Monster Raving Loony Party, he campaigned to lower the voting age and emphasised the importance of youth participation in democracy. Visiting schools and youth gatherings across Britain, Sutch delivered lively talks that mixed satire with civic engagement, urging teenagers to see the ballot box as a means of change. His blend of rock-and-roll showmanship and political parody made him an unlikely yet memorable advocate for voter awareness among Britain's youth.

Sutch pulled out of the 1997 general election to take care of his sick mother in South Harrow. Later that year he contested his last two by-elections, in Uxbridge and Winchester.

In 1999 Sutch starred in a Coco Pops advert as a returning officer announcing the results of its renaming competition.

Some of Sutch's Loony Party policies were later adopted by mainstream parties and became law. Specifically:

- His demands for commercial radio (introduced by the government in 1974)
- Votes for teenagers (the voting age was reduced from 21 to 18 in 1970)
- Passports for dogs (the introduction of pet passports allowed for their international travel without quarantine regimens)

== Personal life ==
Sutch was friends with Cynthia Payne, and at one time lived at her house.

In 1991, his autobiography, Life as Sutch: The Official Autobiography of a Raving Loony (co-written with Peter Chippindale), was published. In 2005 Graham Sharpe, who had known him since the late 1960s, wrote the first biography, The Man Who Was Screaming Lord Sutch.

Sutch had a history of depression, and killed himself by hanging on 16 June 1999 at his late mother's house in West Harrow, London. At the inquest, his fiancée Yvonne Elwood said he had manic depression, now known as bipolar disorder. He is buried beside his mother, who died shortly before the 1997 general election. He had one son, Tristan Lord Gwynne Sutch, born in 1975 to American model Thann Rendessy.

A day before his suicide, 15 June 1999, he wrote an entry into his calendar reading "depression depression depression is too much".

== Discography ==
=== Studio albums ===
- Lord Sutch and Heavy Friends, also known as Smoke and Fire (1970), as Lord Sutch and Heavy Friends, with Jimmy Page, John Bonham, Jeff Beck, Noel Redding and Nicky Hopkins – AUS No. 16, US No. 84
- Rock & Horror (1982), Ace Records CDCHM 65

=== Live albums ===
- Hands of Jack the Ripper (1972), as Lord Sutch and Heavy Friends, with Ritchie Blackmore, Matthew Fisher, Carlo Little, Keith Moon, Noel Redding and Nick Simper
- Alive and Well (1980)
- Live Manifesto (1992)
- Murder in the Graveyard (1992), as Screaming Lord Sutch and the Undertakers

=== Compilations ===
- Jack the Ripper (1985), Autograph Records ASK 780
- Story/Screaming Lord Sutch & the Savages (1991)
- Raving Loony Party Favourites (1996)

Posthumously released:

- Monster Rock (2000)
- Munster Rock (2001)
- Screaming Lord Sutch and the Savages: 1961–1968 (2020)

=== Extended plays ===
- The Meteors meet Screaming Lord Sutch: Ace Records 12", 1981

Posthumously released:

- Midnight Man (2000)
- The London Rock & Roll Show DVD

=== Singles ===
- "'Til the Following Night" b/w "Good Golly Miss Molly" (1961)
- "Jack the Ripper" b/w "Don't You Just Know It" (1963)
- "I'm a Hog for You" b/w "Monster in Black Tights" (1963)
- "She's Fallen in Love with the Monster Man" b/w "Bye Bye Baby" (1964)
- "Dracula's Daughter" b/w "Come Back Baby" (1964)
- "The Train Kept A-Rollin'" b/w "Honey Hush" (1965)
- "The Cheat" b/w "Black and Hairy" (1965)
- "Purple People Eater" b/w "You Don't Care" (1966)
- "'Cause I Love You" b/w "Thumping Beat" (1970), as Lord Sutch and Heavy Friends
- "Election Fever" b/w "Rock the Election" (1970), as Lord Sutch and Heavy Friends
- "Gotta Keep A-Rocking" b/w "Country Club" (1972), as Lord Sutch and Heavy Friends

== Elections contested ==
Election	Type	Constituency	Party	Vote	% vote	Place	Candidates
15 August 1963	BE	Stratford-upon-Avon	National Teenage	209	0.6	5	5
31 March 1966	GE	Huyton ^{1}	National Teenage	585	0.9	3	22
18 June 1970	GE	Cities of London and Westminster	Young Ideas	142	0.4	5	5
10 October 1974	GE	Stafford and Stone	Go to Blazes	351	0.6	4	4
24 February 1983	BE	Bermondsey	Official Monster Raving Loony	97	0.3	6	16
23 March 1983	BE	Darlington	Official Monster Raving Loony	374	0.7	4	8
9 June 1983	GE	Finchley ^{1}	Official Monster Raving Loony	235	0.6	5	11
28 July 1983	BE	Penrith and The Border	Official Monster Raving Loony	412	1.1	4	8
1 March 1984	BE	Chesterfield	Official Monster Raving Loony	178	0.3	5	17
4 July 1985	BE	Brecon and Radnor	Official Monster Raving Loony	202	0.5	5	7
10 April 1986	BE	Fulham	Official Monster Raving Loony	134	0.4	5	11
17 July 1986	BE	Newcastle-under-Lyme	Official Monster Raving Loony	277	0.7	4	7
14 July 1988	BE	Kensington	Official Monster Raving Loony	61	0.3	7	15
10 November 1988	BE	Glasgow Govan	Official Monster Raving Loony	174	0.6	7	8
15 December 1988	BE	Epping Forest	Official Monster Raving Loony	208	0.6	7	9
23 February 1989	BE	Richmond (Yorks)	Official Monster Raving Loony	167	0.3	6	9
4 May 1989	BE	Vale of Glamorgan	Official Monster Raving Loony	266	0.6	8	11
15 June 1989	BE	Vauxhall	Official Monster Raving Loony	106	0.4	10	14
15 June 1989	EE	London Central	Official Monster Raving Loony	841	0.5	6	8
22 March 1990	BE	Mid Staffordshire	Official Monster Raving Loony	336	0.6	7	14
24 May 1990	BE	Bootle ^{2}	Official Monster Raving Loony	418	1.2	6	8
27 September 1990	BE	Knowsley South	Official Monster Raving Loony	197	0.9	6	7
8 November 1990	BE	Bootle ^{3}	Official Monster Raving Loony	310	1.1	5	7
7 March 1991	BE	Ribble Valley ^{3}	Official Monster Raving Loony	278	0.6	6	9
4 April 1991	BE	Neath	Official Monster Raving Loony	263	0.8	7	8
16 May 1991	BE	Monmouth ^{4}	Official Monster Raving Loony	314	0.7	4	7
4 July 1991	BE	Liverpool Walton	Official Monster Raving Loony	546	1.4	5	6
9 April 1992	GE	Huntingdon ^{1}	Official Monster Raving Loony	728	1.0	6	10
9 April 1992	GE	Islwyn ^{5}	Official Monster Raving Loony	547	1.3	5	5
9 April 1992	GE	Yeovil ^{6}	Official Monster Raving Loony	338	0.6	5	6
6 May 1993	BE	Newbury	Official Monster Raving Loony	432	0.7	7	19
29 July 1993	BE	Christchurch	Official Monster Raving Loony	404	0.8	5	6
5 May 1994	BE	Rotherham	Official Monster Raving Loony	1,114	4.2	4	5
9 June 1994	BE	Bradford South	Official Monster Raving Loony	727	2.4	4	5
9 June 1994	BE	Eastleigh	Official Monster Raving Loony	783	1.4	5	14
16 February 1995	BE	Islwyn	Official Monster Raving Loony	506	2.2	5	7
25 May 1995	BE	Perth and Kinross	Official Monster Raving Loony	586	1.4	5	9
27 July 1995	BE	Littleborough and Saddleworth	Official Monster Raving Loony	782	1.9	4	10
1 February 1996	BE	Hemsworth	Official Monster Raving Loony	652	3.0	5	10
11 April 1996	BE	South East Staffordshire	Official Monster Raving Loony	506	1.2	5	13
31 July 1997	BE	Uxbridge	Official Monster Raving Loony	396	1.3	4	11
20 November 1997	BE	Winchester	Official Monster Raving Loony	316	0.6	5	8

Notes:-

- ^{1} This election was won by the incumbent Prime Minister.
- ^{2} Sutch achieved a better result than the candidate from the rump SDP.
- ^{3} Sutch achieved a better result than the candidate from the continuing Liberal Party.
- ^{4} Sutch achieved a better result than the joint candidate from the Green Party of England and Wales and Plaid Cymru.
- ^{5} This election was won by the incumbent Leader of the Opposition.
- ^{6} This election was won by the incumbent Leader of the Liberal Democrats.

Party political offices
New creation	Official Monster Raving Loony Party Leader; 1983–1999	Succeeded by Howling Laud Hope and Catmando
