= Shivering Sands Army Fort =

Sea fort in the Thames Estuary, UK

- Thames estuary
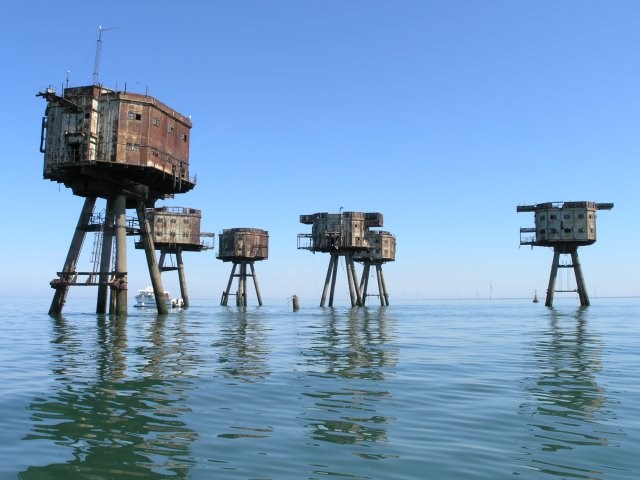
- Shivering Sands Army Fort in 2006

Site information
- Type: Offshore, anti-aircraft fortress

Location
- Location in the Thames Estuary
- Coordinates: 51°29.95′N 1°4.48′E

Site history
- Built: 1943
- In use: 1943-1958
- Battles/wars: World War II; Cold War

Shivering Sands Army Fort [U7] was a Maunsell army fort built near the Thames estuary for anti-aircraft defence. It is made up of several once-interconnected towers north of Herne Bay and is 14.8 km (9.2 miles) from the nearest land. They can be viewed from Shoeburyness East Beach on clear days. The Shivering Sands fort was the last of the Thames estuary forts to be constructed, and was grounded between 18 September and 13 December 1943.

== History ==
The towers were built on land and floated out in 1943. Later in the war, the equipment was replaced, and removed soon after. The forts were abandoned in 1958. In the 1960s, some weather equipment was installed in the searchlight tower. On 7 June 1963, a boat called the Ribersborg collided with one of the towers, which fell into the sea without harming anyone or sinking the boat.

In 1964 Screaming Lord Sutch set up Radio Sutch (a pirate radio station) on one of the old towers. However, he soon became bored and handed the project to his friend and unpaid manager Reginald Calvert, who then expanded into all five towers that were still connected and called it Radio City. After Calvert was killed by Oliver Smedley, his wife took over for a short time before the project was closed by legislation and the towers again abandoned.

In 1990, the top of the searchlight tower was cut away so that helicopters could be used to maintain the weather equipment inside. In 1992, it was decided that the tower was no longer necessary for the continued operation of the instruments contained within, and a large buoy was placed next to the tower for the same purpose.

In August and September 2005, artist Stephen Turner spent six weeks living alone in the searchlight tower of the Shivering Sands Fort, in what he described as "an artistic exploration of isolation, investigating how one's experience of time changes in isolation, and what creative contemplation means in a 21st-century context".

== Cultural references ==
The forts, filmed from a North Sea ferry, appear in the 1984 music video for the song "A Sort of Homecoming" by the Irish pop music band U2.

The British indie band, The Mystery Jets, filmed the music video of their song "Bubblegum" at Shivering Sands Army Fort.

Science fiction writer Sheila Finch's 1982 novella Not This Tide used the Shivering Sands fort as one of its settings.
