= Reginald Calvert =

British radio executive

Pearce Reginald Hartley Calvert (1928 – 21 June 1966) was an English artist manager, born in Huddersfield, Yorkshire, England.

He was the manager of The Fortunes, Pinkerton's Assorted Colours, Screaming Lord Sutch, and other pop groups. In 1964, after hearing Radio Caroline, he decided to start his own pirate radio station, and made use of an old World War II fort in the Thames Estuary. Originally, the station was called Radio Sutch, and it started broadcasting on 27 May 1964, on 1542kHz. They had a summer of fun, but when Sutch decided to return to performing, Reg Calvert carried on, renamed it Radio City, and put it onto a more professional footing.

Calvert was shot and killed by Oliver Smedley, the former owner of a rival offshore station, Radio Atlanta, who was later acquitted of murder on the grounds of self-defence.

== Life and career ==
Calvert was born into a family of musicians in Huddersfield, and was conscripted into the army in 1946, after being demobbed he moved to Southampton where he attempted various means of making a living, including making popcorn, compering ballroom dances and playing piano in a club.

=== Music manager ===
In 1956, Calvert heard Bill Haley's "Rock Around the Clock", he then determined that his ambition was to bring rock and roll music to Britain. Calvert then embarked on a career as a music manager, and set about assembling a stable of young musicians, who would tour the country and play the hits of the day, while imitating the looks and style of the popular stars of the time.

In 1961, Calvert bought Clifton Hall, a former stately home near Rugby, Warwickshire as a base for his operations, where he assembled, created and managed an array of bands. These included Danny Storm, Buddy Britten, The Fortunes, Pinkerton's Assorted Colours, and Robbie Hood And His Merrie Men. Of these, The Fortunes and Pinkerton's Assorted Colours went on to have mainstream commercial success. In 1962, Clifton Hall was featured in a short film made by British Pathé.

Calvert also managed the musical career of Screaming Lord Sutch; it was Calvert who suggested that Sutch stand as a candidate at the 1963 Stratford-upon-Avon by-election as a publicity stunt, therefore launching Sutch's career as a political candidate.

=== Pirate radio ===
Calvert established the pirate station Radio City, which broadcast from a Second World War marine fort off the Kent coast, seven miles from Margate. Radio Atlanta, the second pirate radio station, ran out of money and merged with Radio Caroline, which had also run out of money. It was decided that Calvert would be asked to amalgamate with them and they would pay the bills, giving Calvert 50% of the profit. After a couple of months, Radio Atlanta was again in financial difficulty and not paying bills or wages, so Calvert resumed control. Later in 1965, Major Oliver Smedley and Allan Crawford approached him again to go into partnership, on the proviso that they would provide a new transmitter. In December 1965, the transmitter arrived from Texas. It was old and very large, and the wrong sort of transmitter. The power pack fell in the sea as they tried to hoist it onto the station, and although it was dried out, the transmitter used too much power and was unsuitable. Neither Radio City nor Atlanta engineers could get it to work properly. Shortly afterwards, Atlanta sent Radio City a bill of £600 for the transport from Texas. Calvert returned it to Atlanta, on the grounds that the transmitter was its responsibility and could be collected at any time.

Smedley approached Calvert again, saying he had someone interested in buying the station, and came to the office with a Mr Fablon to go through the accounts. By May 1965, Radio City was one of the few very profitable stations. Nothing further was heard from Fablon, but unknown to Calvert, Smedley had put together a company and, as chairman, was trying to sell shares in Radio City without Calvert's knowledge.

In June 1966, Calvert agreed to go into partnership with another pirate station, Radio London. When Smedley telephoned Calvert to tell him he again had some buyers interested, Calvert explained he was entering into a partnership with Radio London instead. Smedley shouted abuse down the telephone and decided to take over Radio City with a boarding party in the middle of the night. Allan Crawford from Radio Atlanta refused to join in the boarding party. He tried to persuade Smedley not to go ahead with his plan, and told him not to use the name of Atlanta.

Smedley's response was to hire a group of riggers, who boarded Radio City on 20 June and put the station's transmitter out of action. First Smedley contacted Phillip Birch from Radio London and demanded £5,000 and half the profits to take his men off. Birch accused him of blackmail and refused to pay. Next, Smedley demanded the same of Calvert, who also refused. News from Radio City was that the boarders were armed and would destroy all the equipment if Calvert or anyone else tried to evict them. Calvert went to the police to ask for their support, but they refused as it was outside their legal jurisdiction. They suggested he should sort it out with Smedley. Calvert tried repeatedly to do so but Smedley was never available – he was trying to sell the station to Radio 390.

== Homicide and acquital ==
On 21 June, Calvert visited Smedley's home at Wendens Ambo, Essex, to request the removal of the raiders and the return of vital transmitter parts. Calvert was shot dead by Smedley in what has been described as a "violent row". Smedley said he did it to protect his housekeeper and at the subsequent trial, it was alleged that there was a violent struggle. Smedley claimed that he feared Calvert was there to kill him and he was acquitted of murder on the grounds of self-defence.

Calvert was buried on 1 July 1966 at St Peter's, Dunchurch. Screaming Lord Sutch and members of the group Pinkerton's Assorted Colours were among the mourners at the funeral.

== Critical response ==
Partly in response to the sensational death of Calvert, and lurid tales of piracy, the British government passed the Marine Broadcasting Offences Act 1967, which made offshore broadcasting a criminal offence as of 15 August 1967. Radio City stopped broadcasting after Calvert's wife Dorothy, whom he had married in 1946, appeared in court charged under the older Wireless Telegraphy Act 1949, because the station was sited within the 3-mile (5 km) limit. Radio City closed down shortly after Dorothy Calvert lost the case.

== Personal life ==
His wife Dorothy Rowe Calvert died on 21 February 2010. Her funeral and interment, also at St Peter's, Dunchurch, took place on 5 March 2010.

== See also ==
- Pirate radio in Europe

== Gallery ==
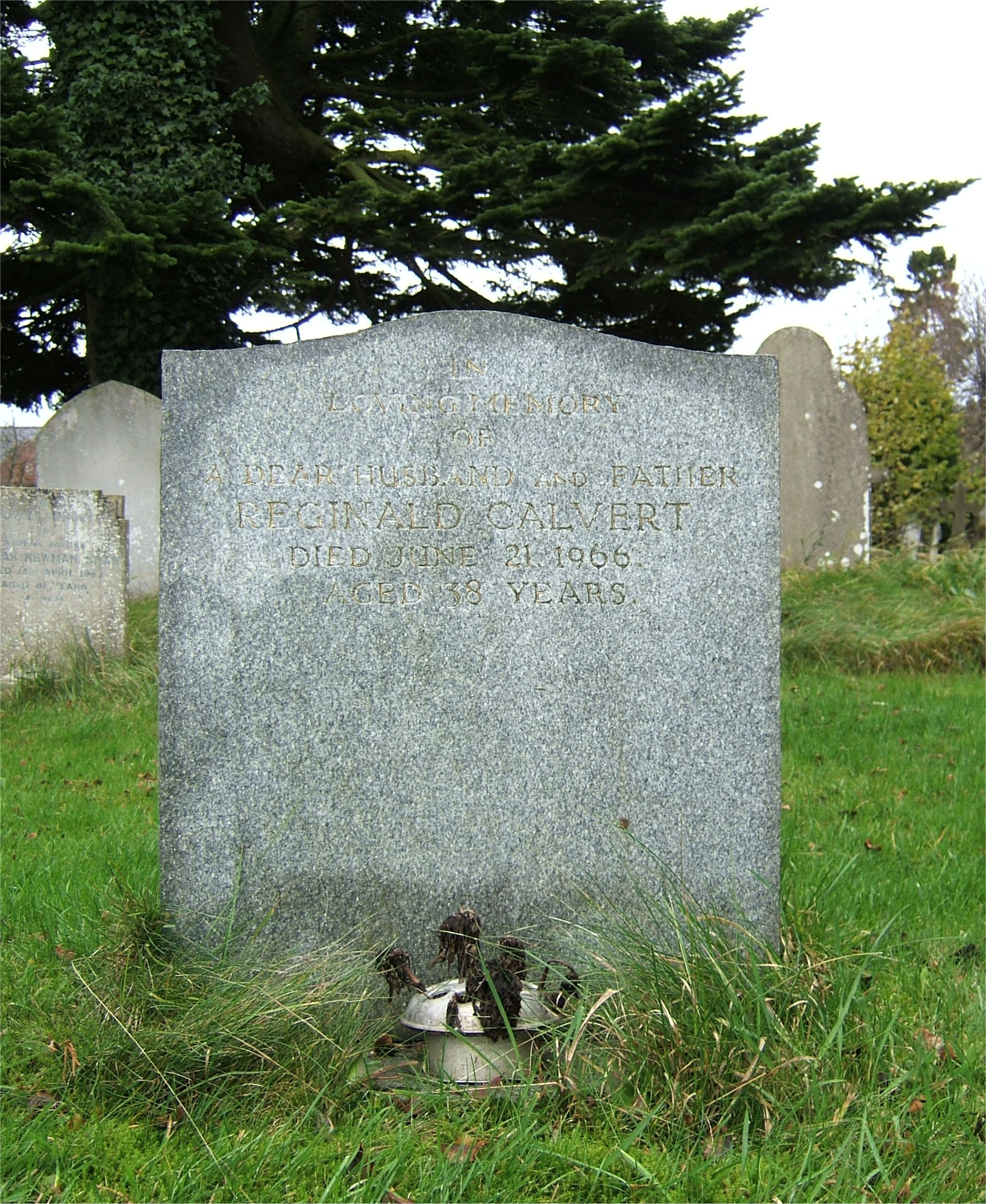
Gravestone in St. Peter's Churchyard, Dunchurch.

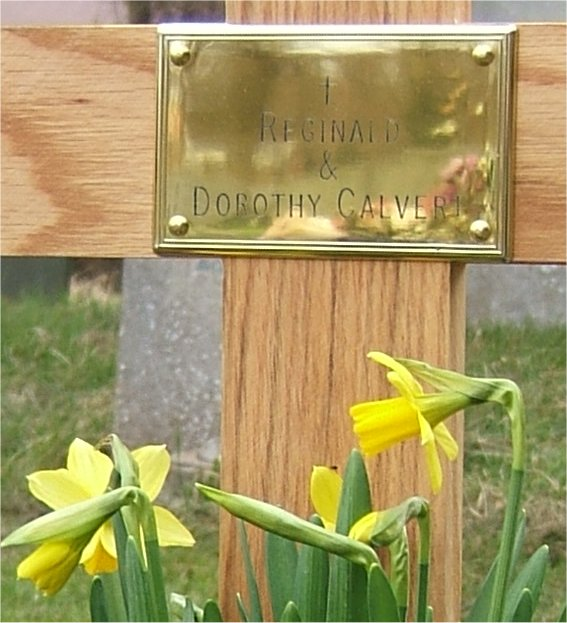
Temporary marker in St. Peter's Churchyard, Dunchurch.

== Literature ==
- Johnny Rogan, Starmakers and Svengalis: The History of British Pop Management. Futura, 1989. ISBN 0-7088-4004-3 (hardback edition. Queen Anne Press, 1988, ISBN 0-356-15138-7. Both contain a long chapter on Reg Calvert detailing his life)
- Adrian Johns: Death of a Pirate: British Radio and the Making of the Information Age. W. W. Norton & Company, 2010 ISBN 0-393-06860-9
- S.K. Moore: (Book 1 of trilogy) Popcorn to Rock 'n' Roll. Biography of Reg and Dorothy Calvert 1946 – 1960. Available on Kindle and from Amazon Books. ISBN 978-0-9515116-7-1
- S.K. Moore: (Book 2 or trilogy) Clifton Hall – School of Rock 'n' Roll. Biography of Reg and Dorothy Calvert 1960 – 1964. To be published summer 2016.
- REG – stage play with music. Act 1: School of Rock 'n' Roll. Act 2: Death of a Pirate. Details: www.regcalvert-plays.co.uk
