= EE Ltd v Office of Communications =

UK enterprise law case

EE Ltd v Ofcom
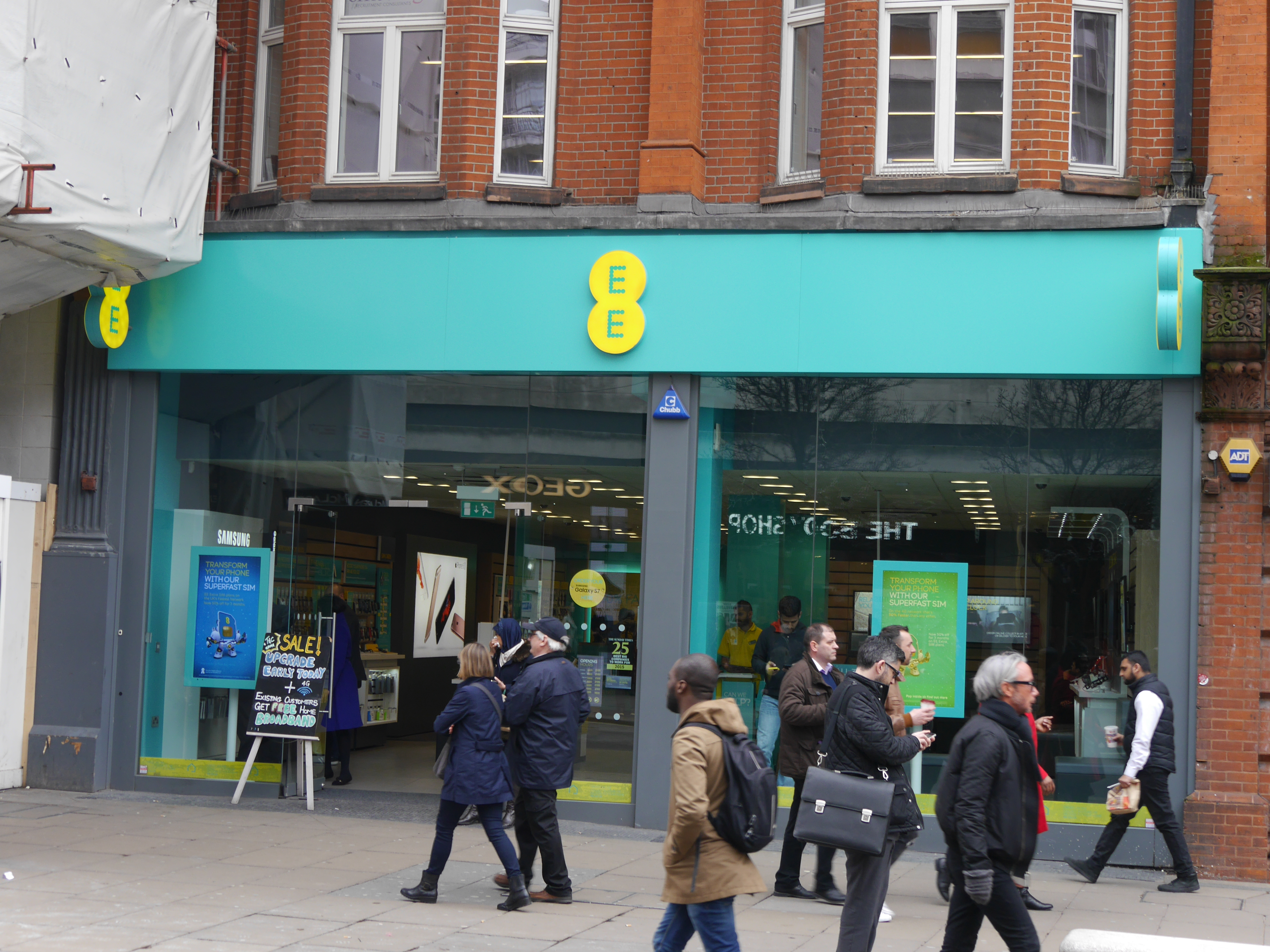
- Court: Court of Appeal
- Citation: [2017] EWCA Civ 1873

Case history
- Prior action: [2016] EWHC 2134 (Admin)

Keywords
- Telecommunications

EE Ltd v Office of Communications [2017] EWCA Civ 1873 is a UK enterprise law case, concerning telecommunications.

== Facts ==
EE claimed that Ofcom’s decision to set licence fees for 900 MHz and 1800 MHz bands of radio spectrum for mobile phones wrongly interpreted its powers. Under the Wireless Telegraphy Act 2006 s 5 the Secretary of State could give Ofcom directions about performing its functions. It issued the Wireless Telegraphy Act 2006 (Directions to OFCOM) Order 2010, where art 6 required Ofcom to revise its annual licence fees for 900MHz and 1800MHz bands to reflect full market value, and conduct an auction. In 2015, Ofcom decided the new licence fees by reference to their best possible alternative use, or scarcity value, as opposed to a ‘costs recovery’ basis. This meant licence fees charged to EE Ltd went from £25m to £75m a year. EE Ltd argued this wrongly excluded considerations in the Communications Framework Directive 2002/21 article 8, requiring a National Regulatory Authority (i.e. Ofcom) to (1) promote competition, (2) develop the internal market, and (3) promote EU citizen interests (4) apply objective, transparent, non-discriminatory and proportionate principles. Ofcom admitted it failed to consider article 8 criteria, in an impact assessment because it argued its discretion was eliminated by the Secretary of State's direction.

== Judgment ==
=== High Court ===
Cranston J held Ofcom correctly interpreted art 6 of the Order, requiring full market value. Once the SS had issued a direction under WTA 2006 s 5, Ofcom’s duties under the Directive were replaced by the Direction.

=== Court of Appeal ===
The Court of Appeal held that art 8 considerations were not taken into account, and they ought to have been. The Secretary of State was not authorised by WTA 2006 section 5 to direct Ofcom to ignore its statutory duties under the Directive. They were non-delegable. Nor could the Secretary of State relieve Ofcom of its statutory duties. This meant Ofcom would have to reconsider its decision taking into account article 8. Delegated legislation should be read to avoid a conclusion that it is ultra vires: Raymond v Honey [1983] 1 AC 1. The word ‘reflect’ should mean ‘set by reference to’ as Ofcom argued, which meant art 6 did not exclude the art 8 considerations from Ofcom’s decision on the licence fee. Therefore Ofcom failed to give effect to the Direction, as properly construed, and would have to reconsider the fees it had set.

2. Ofcom is the statutory body charged under the provisions of the Communications Act 2003 ("CA 2003") and the Wireless Telegraphy Act 2006 ("WTA 2006") with functions which include the management and licensing of radio spectrum in the United Kingdom. It is also the National Regulatory Authority ("NRA") for the purposes of the relevant EU legislation; in particular the Directives known as and comprising the Common Regulatory Framework ("CRF") for electronic communications. These include what I shall refer to as the Framework Directive (2001/21/EC) and the Authorisation Directive (2002/20/EC).

3. Radio spectrum describes the radio bands used to provide various forms of communication services including mobile telephones and wireless broadband. They are measured in megahertz (MHz) frequencies. 1000 MHz equals 1 gigahertz (GHz). Frequencies between 200 MHz and 3 GHz are considered to be the most valuable because they have what the evidence describes as good propagation characteristics and a large enough bandwidth to make them suitable for accommodating the quantities of information now in demand by the users of the internet.

4. In the 1980s and 1990s mobile operators were allocated the 900 MHz and 1800 MHz bands on what was essentially a first-come, first-served basis. Vodafone UK Limited ("Vodafone") and Telefónica UK Limited ("O2") obtained licences for 900 MHz spectrum in 1985, and in 1991 licences were granted for the 1800 MHz band, most of which is now allocated between EE and Hutchison 3G UK Limited ("Three").

5. From the 1990s onwards the 900 MHz and 1800 MHz bands have been used to provide second generation ("2G") mobile services but the licences for these frequencies have subsequently been liberalised in order to accommodate (in 2011) third generation ("3G") services and (in 2012-13) fourth generation ("4G") services, both of which use new forms of technology in order to provide high-speed data transfer.

6. This process of liberalisation began in 2007 when member states of the EU agreed to allow the 900 MHz and 1800 MHz bands to be made available for 3G services and to repeal Council Directive 87/372/EEC ("the GSM Directive") which had restricted the 900 MHz band to GSM (Global System for Mobile Communications) technology that was suitable only for voice and low-speed data services. As a result, Ofcom decided to release part of the 900 MHz band for 3G use but at a fee which would value the available band by reference to what it referred to as the opportunity cost of the spectrum. This means the value of the spectrum in question by reference to its best possible alternative use.

[...]

32. In response to the consultation paper on fees, a number of mobile operators said that Ofcom should carry out an impact assessment of their proposals to raise fees to reflect market value unless it could demonstrate that the setting of fees at their full economic value was necessary to promote the optimum use of the spectrum and would not adversely impact on the other objectives set out in Article 8 of the Framework Directive. This was rejected by Ofcom in a further consultation paper of 1 August 2014 and again in its final decision on the consultation published in September 2015:

"1.22 … because we did not have any discretion to decide whether or not to set [annual licence fees] at full market value, since we had been directed by the Government to do so and we were required to implement that direction."

33. EE therefore commenced proceedings for judicial review of Ofcom's decision to set licence fees at this level as implemented in the 2015 Regulations. In [30] of its statement of grounds, EE contends that by reason of its interpretation of the meaning and effect of the 2010 Direction Ofcom has deliberately left out of account any considerations other than the market value of the spectrum in question including the Article 8 considerations.

[...]

51. Lord Pannick QC for EE submits that there is nothing in either the WTA 2006 or in the CRF which permits a member state to remove a regulatory function from an NRA. In the United Kingdom the function of setting licence fees has been delegated to Ofcom by primary legislation and, absent clear words, that position cannot be changed by subordinated legislation in the form of the 2010 Direction. By the same token, the 2010 Direction cannot have been effective to remove from Ofcom the duty imposed on it by s.4(2) of CA 2003.

52. The general principle is not in dispute and the question of vires really turns on s.5 of WTA 2006. Does it empower the Secretary of State to repatriate to himself the function of setting licence fees in accordance with Article 8 and, if so, did the 2010 Direction have this effect?

53. Section 5 of WTA 2006 allows the Secretary of State to give directions to Ofcom "about the carrying out by them of their radio spectrum functions". These include the power to set licence fees which is contained in s.12 (see s.5(4)(b)). Although s.5(3) allows a direction to require Ofcom to exercise its powers "in such manner" as the Secretary of State specifies (s.5(3)(b)), what it does not do is to transfer to the Secretary of State the function of exercising the s.12 power. Lord Pannick submitted that had it purported to do so that would have been a breach of the provisions of the CRF and, in particular, Articles 3 and 3a of the Framework Directive which require member states to guarantee the impartiality of NRAs and requires them to act independently. But it is not necessary to resort to EU law. The power to give directions is in respect of the exercise by Ofcom of its radio spectrum functions. The Secretary of State was not thereby empowered to exercise those functions himself nor did he purport to give himself that power by the 2010 Direction. It is phrased in terms of requiring Ofcom to exercise its powers so as to implement the package of reforms including directing Ofcom to raise the licence fees.

54. The question therefore arises whether s.5 authorises the Secretary of State to direct Ofcom in exercising its s.12 powers to ignore the duties imposed on it by s.4(2) of CA 2003 and s.3(5) of WTA 2006. In my view, it does not. Parliament has imposed those duties on Ofcom (compatibly with Article 8 of the Framework Directive) to be performed "in carrying out" its radio spectrum functions. It did not obviously contemplate or in my view authorise the performance of the Article 8 duty by someone who was not the regulator and who was not carrying out the relevant function to which the duty relates. In the absence of clear words, the s.4(2) duty is to be treated as non-delegable and there is nothing in s.5 of WTA 2006 which in terms allows the Secretary of State to relieve Ofcom of the statutory duties which Parliament has expressly imposed on it. The language of s.5 is entirely neutral.

55. For these reasons, I reject the judge's analysis of s.5 as a lex specialis and, for the same reason, I decline to read Article 6 of the 2010 Direction in a way which would render it ultra vires WTA 2006. In my view, the word "reflect" should be read in the sense contended for by Lord Pannick and Mr Fordham with the result that Article 6 does not exclude the Article 8 considerations from Ofcom's determination of the licence fees. In these circumstances, it is not necessary to consider a conforming construction of Article 6 on HHMarleasingHH principles still less issues of disapplication. The 2010 Direction can be given a meaning under domestic law which is also EU compliant. My conclusions on this issue also make it unnecessary to consider the argument that the proper occasion for judicial review was when the 2010 Direction was made. Ofcom has failed to give effect to the Direction as properly construed.

56. I would therefore allow the appeal.

Henderson LJ and Asplin LJ agreed.

== See also ==
- United Kingdom enterprise law
- EU law
