= Official Monster Raving Loony Party =

British satirical political party

The Official Monster Raving Loony Party
- Abbreviation: OMRLP
- Leader: Alan "Howling Laud" Hope
- Founder: David "Screaming Lord" Sutch
- Founded: 16 June 1982; 44 years ago
- Headquarters: 59 New Barn Close, Fleet, Hampshire, GU51 5HU
- Membership: 457
- Ideology: Political satire
- Colours: Yellow and black

Website
- loonyparty.com

The Official Monster Raving Loony Party (OMRLP; Welsh: Plaid Swyddogol yr Anghenfilaidd Ddihirod Gwallgof, Scottish Gaelic: Pàrtaidh Oifigeil Gealtach a Bhios a' Rabadh Uilebheistean) is a satirical political party established in the United Kingdom in 1982 by the musician David Sutch, also known as Screaming Lord Sutch, 3rd Earl of Harrow, or simply Lord Sutch. It is known for its deliberately bizarre policies and for fielding novelty candidates to offer itself as an alternative for protest voters, especially in constituencies where the party holding a safe seat is unlikely to lose it.

In 1997 their leader Alan "Howling Laud" Hope was elected unopposed to Ashburton Town Council in Devon. In 1999 Hope moved to Hampshire, where he became a member of Fleet council, once again uncontested. Since its founding the party has participated in 11 general elections, although it has not won representation in UK Parliament.

== History ==
=== Sutch era ===
Starting in 1963, David Sutch, head of the rock group Screaming Lord Sutch and the Savages, stood in British parliamentary elections under a range of party names, initially as the National Teenage Party candidate. At that time, the minimum voting age was 21. The party's name was intended to highlight what Sutch and others viewed as hypocrisy, since teenagers were unable to vote because of their supposed immaturity while the adults running the country were involved in scandals such as the Profumo affair.

Sutch moved to America in 1968. After being shot during a mugging attempt while living in the United States, Sutch returned to Britain (and to politics) during the 1980s. The Raving Loony name first appeared at the Bermondsey by-election of 1983.

A similar concept had appeared earlier in the Election Night Special sketch on the television comedy series Monty Python's Flying Circus, in which the Silly and Sensible parties competed; and a similar skit by The Goodies, in which Graeme Garden stood as a Science Loony. A Science Fiction Looney candidate had also competed in the 1976 Cambridge by-election.

Two others were important in the formation of the OMRLP: John Desmond Dougrez-Lewis stood in the Crosby by-election of 1981 (won by the Social Democratic Party's co-founder Shirley Williams); and Dougrez-Lewis stood in the by-election as Tarquin Fin-tim-lin-bin-whin-bim-lim-bus-stop-F'tang-F'tang-Olé-Biscuitbarrel, taken from the Election Night Special Monty Python sketch. He had changed his name by deed poll from John Desmond Lewis, on behalf of the Cambridge University Raving Loony Society (Curls), an "anti-political party" and charity fundraising group formed largely as a fun counter-response to increasingly polarised student politics in Cambridge. It was responsible for a number of fun stunts. Its Oxford University equivalents were the "Oxford Raving Lunatics". Dougrez-Lewis became Sutch's agent at the Bermondsey by-election, where the OMRLP banner was first officially unfurled. Reverting to his original name, Dougrez-Lewis stood for the new party in Cambridge in the 1983 general election.

Another serial offbeat by-election candidate was Commander Bill Boaks, a retired World War II hero who took part in sinking the Bismarck. Boaks campaigned and stood for election for over 30 years on limited funds, always on the issue of road safety. Boaks proved influential on Sutch's direction as the leading anti-politician: "It's the ones who don't vote you really want, because they're the ones who think."

Boaks thought that increased traffic and more roads would cause problems, and he addressed road safety with flamboyant campaigning and a variety of tactics, including private prosecution of public figures who escaped public prosecution for drunk driving. He successfully campaigned with Sutch and others to pedestrianise London's Carnaby Street. While recovering from being struck by a motorcycle, Boaks was one of Sutch's counting agents at Bermondsey in 1983. Following Boaks's death, popular opinion towards road safety has become closer to his views.

Screaming Lord Sutch died by suicide on 16 June 1999 while suffering from clinical depression after his mother, Annie, died in 1998. A biography of Sutch, The Man Who Was Screaming Lord Sutch (by Graham Sharpe, the media relations manager of bookmaker William Hill), was published in April 2005, describing what remained of the party as "wannabes, never-would-bes and some bloody-well-shouldn't-bes".

=== Post-Sutch ===
Sutch's funeral – organised by his friend, the session drummer and former Rolling Stones member Carlo Little – was attended by members of the OMRLP and Raving Loony Green Giant Party, including Stuart Hughes, who with Freddie Zapp brought along a huge floral tribute shaped as an OMRLP rosette. The running of the OMRLP fell to Alan "Howling Laud" Hope and his cat, Catmando, who were the joint winners of the 1999 membership ballot for the replacement for Sutch. Although Hope took over as party leader after Sutch's death, the real day-to-day running of the party has always been done by other party members.

The OMRLP fielded 15 candidates in the 2001 general election, at which it had its best general election results to date.

The manifesto, entitled The Manicfesto, for the 2005 general election featured the major commitment of their long held pledge to abolish income tax, citing as always that it was only meant to be a temporary measure during the Napoleonic Wars. Also included was another old staple, the "Putting Parliament on Wheels" idea of having Parliament sit throughout the country rather than solely in London – with special emphasis this time in its creation negating the need for national/regional assemblies.

The OMRLP has fielded candidates since 2001, with reduced success and losing their deposits.

The OMRLP's official headquarters was originally the Golden Lion Hotel in Ashburton, Devon, then the Dog & Partridge pub at Yateley in Hampshire, but this was lost shortly after the 2005 general election. Conference venues are now chosen in advance: the 2006 conference was held at Torrington in Devon, and the 2007 conference was held in Jersey. The conference was held in Blackpool in 2017.

The party's last elected representative was R. U. Seerius (formerly Jon Brewer) on the eleven-member Sawley Parish Council in Derbyshire, first elected (uncontested) in 2005. He was no longer a member as of May 2007, having failed to appear at no fewer than 11 statutory meetings during his time in office, due to illness.

In March 2007, the party's vice-president Melodie "Boney Maroney" Staniforth left the party, although she ran in the Kirklees election in April 2007. The OMRLP succeeded in standing in the two by-elections of 19 July 2007 in Sedgefield and Ealing Southall, but again achieving derisory results: Alan Hope acquiring 129 votes (0.46%) and John Cartwright taking 188 (0.51%), beating the English Democrats but coming behind the Christian Party of the Reverend George Hargreaves and David Braid.

In recognition that reforms were needed, Peter 'T.C.' Owen was moved from the honorary position of party chairman to that of deputy leader (and thus effective day-to-day leader) of the OMRLP, while Anthony "The Jersey Flyer" Blyth (owner of the Ommaroo Hotel and a member of the Jersey Heritage Trust) took over Owen's role. Owen is one of four Raving Loonies to have scored more than 1,000 votes in an election (he polled 2,859 votes in the 1994 European elections).

On 31 May 2017, Hope was interviewed by Andrew Neil on the BBC's Daily Politics programme.

== Electoral performance ==
In 1987, the OMRLP won its first seat on Ashburton Town Council in Devon, as Alan "Howling Laud" Hope was elected unopposed. He subsequently became deputy mayor and later mayor of Ashburton in 1998 (mainly opposed by the local Conservatives; they allegedly never forgave him for becoming a member of the OMRLP) until he moved to Hampshire after Sutch's death. For over a decade, his hotel, The Golden Lion, in Ashburton (referred to by some in the party as "The Mucky Mog") was the party's headquarters and conference centre.

Two councillors subsequently became mayors: Alan Hope in Ashburton in Devon and Chris "Screwy" Driver on the Isle of Sheppey in Kent.

At the Bootle by-election in May 1990, the Loony candidate (Sutch) received more votes than the candidate for the continuing Social Democrats. The story was a major headline in many UK newspapers; ironically, the by-election itself had attracted little coverage. Bootle is still regarded by the party as their most significant result in politics, albeit one largely lampooning the political world.

In the 1995 Perth and Kinross by-election, the OMRLP received more votes than the United Kingdom Independence Party and the Scottish Greens. In the 2019 Brecon and Radnorshire by-election, the OMRLP candidate Lady Lily the Pink polled more votes than UKIP. The party fielded 24 candidates and won a record number of votes in the 2019 general election, when it polled 9,739 votes, the party's highest vote at a general election.

The party has yet to save its deposit at a by-election by winning at least 5% of the vote, although Screaming Lord Sutch came close at the 1994 Rotherham by-election as the party's leader, winning 4.2% of the vote.

=== General elections ===
Election	Candidates	Votes	% of votes
1983	11	3,105	0.0
1987	5	1,951	0.0
1992	25	7,929	0.1
1997	24	7,906	0.0
2001	15	6,655	0.0
2005	19	6,311	0.0
2010	27	7,510	0.0
2015	27	3,898	0.0
2017	12	3,890	0.0
2019	24	9,739	0.0
2024	22	5,814	0.0

=== By-elections ===
48th Parliament

Election	Candidate	Votes	% of votes	Result
1983 Bermondsey by-election (Note: Listed on the ballot paper as David Sutch)	Screaming Lord Sutch	97	0.3	6th of 16
1983 Darlington by-election	Screaming Lord Sutch	374	0.7	4th of 8

49th Parliament

Election	Candidate	Votes	% of votes	Result
1983 Penrith and The Border by-election	Screaming Lord Sutch	412	1.1	4th of 8
1984 Chesterfield by-election	Screaming Lord Sutch	178	0.3	5th of 17
1985 Brecon and Radnor by-election	Screaming Lord Sutch	202	0.5	5th of 7
1986 Fulham by-election	Screaming Lord Sutch	134	0.4	5th of 11
1986 Newcastle-under-Lyme by-election	Screaming Lord Sutch	277	0.7	4th of 7

50th Parliament

Election	Candidate	Votes	% of votes	Result
1988 Kensington by-election	Screaming Lord Sutch	61	0.3	7th of 15
1988 Glasgow Govan by-election (Note: Listed on the ballot paper as Lord Sutch)	Screaming Lord Sutch	174	0.6	7th of 8
1988 Epping Forest by-election	Screaming Lord Sutch	208	0.6	7th of 9
1989 Richmond (Yorks) by-election (Note: Listed on the ballot paper as David "Lord" Sutch)	Screaming Lord Sutch	167	0.3	6th of 9
1989 Vale of Glamorgan by-election (Note: Listed on the ballot paper as "Lord" David Sutch)	Screaming Lord Sutch	266	0.5	8th of 11
1989 Vauxhall by-election	Screaming Lord Sutch	106	0.4	10th of 14
1990 Mid Staffordshire by-election (Note: Listed on the ballot paper as Lord David Sutch)	Screaming Lord Sutch	336	0.6	7th of 14
May 1990 Bootle by-election	Screaming Lord Sutch	418	1.2	6th of 8
1990 Knowsley South by-election	Screaming Lord Sutch	197	0.9	6th of 7
November 1990 Bootle by-election	Screaming Lord Sutch	310	1.1	5th of 7
1990 Bradford North by-election	Wild Willi Beckett	210	0.6	8th of 10
1991 Ribble Valley by-election	Screaming Lord Sutch	278	0.6	6th of 9
1991 Neath by-election	Screaming Lord Sutch	263	0.8	7th of 8
1991 Monmouth by-election	Screaming Lord Sutch	314	0.7	4th of 7
1991 Liverpool Walton by-election	Screaming Lord Sutch	546	1.4	5th of 6

51st Parliament

Election	Candidate	Votes	% of votes	Result
1993 Newbury by-election	Screaming Lord Sutch	432	0.7	7th of 19
1993 Christchurch by-election	Screaming Lord Sutch	404	0.8	5th of 14
1994 Rotherham by-election	Screaming Lord Sutch	1,114	4.2	4th of 5
1994 Bradford South by-election	Screaming Lord Sutch	727	2.4	4th of 5
1994 Eastleigh by-election	Screaming Lord Sutch	783	1.4	5th of 6
1995 Islwyn by-election	Screaming Lord Sutch	506	2.2	5th of 7
1995 Perth and Kinross by-election	Screaming Lord Sutch	586	1.4	5th of 9
1995 Littleborough and Saddleworth by-election	Screaming Lord Sutch	782	1.9	4th of 10
1996 Hemsworth by-election	Screaming Lord Sutch	652	3.0	5th of 10
1996 South East Staffordshire by-election	Screaming Lord Sutch	506	1.2	5th of 13

52nd Parliament

Election	Candidate	Votes	% of votes	Result
1997 Uxbridge by-election	Screaming Lord Sutch	396	1.3	4th of 11
1997 Winchester by-election	Screaming Lord Sutch	316	0.6	5th of 8
1999 Eddisbury by-election (Note: Listed on the ballot paper as Alan Hope)	Howling Laud Hope	238	0.7	4th of 6
1999 Kensington and Chelsea by-election	Howling Laud Hope	20	0.1	17th of 18

53rd Parliament

Election	Candidate	Votes	% of votes	Result
2002 Ogmore by-election	Leslie Edwards	187	1.0	8th of 10
2003 Brent East by-election	Howling Laud Hope	59	0.3	13th of 16
2004 Leicester South by-election	R. U. Seerius	225	0.8	6th of 11
2004 Hartlepool by-election	Howling Laud Hope	80	0.3	12th of 14

54th Parliament

Election	Candidate	Votes	% of votes	Result
2006 Blaenau Gwent by-elections (Note: Listed on the ballot paper as Alan "Howling Laud" Hope)	Howling Laud Hope	318	1.2	6th of 6
2006 Bromley and Chislehurst by-election	John Cartwright	132	0.5	9th of 11
2007 Ealing Southall by-election	John Cartwright	188	0.5	9th of 12
2007 Sedgefield by-election	Howling Laud Hope	129	0.5	10th of 11
2008 Crewe and Nantwich by-election	The Flying Brick	236	0.6	7th of 10
2008 Henley by-election	Bananaman Owen	242	0.7	7th of 12
2008 Haltemprice and Howden by-election	Mad Cow-Girl	412	1.7	7th of 26
2009 Norwich North by-election	Howling Laud Hope	144	0.4	9th of 12

55th Parliament

Election	Candidate	Votes	% of votes	Result
2011 Oldham East and Saddleworth by-election	Nick "The Flying Brick" Delves	145	0.4	7th of 10
2011 Barnsley Central by-election	Howling Laud Hope	198	0.8	8th of 9
2011 Leicester South by-election	Howling Laud Hope	553	1.6	5th of 5
2012 Bradford West by-election	Howling Laud Hope	111	0.3	8th of 8
2012 Croydon North by-election	John Cartwright	110	0.4	10th of 12
2012 Manchester Central by-election	Howling Laud Hope	78	0.5	10th of 12
2013 Eastleigh by-election	Howling Laud Hope	136	0.3	9th of 14
2013 South Shields by-election	Howling Laud Hope	197	0.8	8th of 9
2014 Wythenshawe and Sale East by-election	Captain Chaplington-Smythe	288	1.2	7th of 7
2014 Newark by-election	Nick The Flying Brick	168	0.4	7th of 11
2014 Clacton by-election	Howling Laud Hope	127	0.4	7th of 8
2014 Rochester and Strood by-election	Hairy Knorm Davidson	151	0.4	6th of 13

56th Parliament

Election	Candidate	Votes	% of votes	Result
2015 Oldham West and Royton by-election	Sir Oink A-Lot	141	0.5	6th of 6
2016 Tooting by-election	Howling Laud Hope	54	0.2	7th of 14
2016 Witney by-election	Mad Hatter	129	0.3	8th of 14
2016 Richmond Park by-election	Howling Laud Hope	184	0.5	4th of 8
2017 Stoke-on-Trent Central by-election	The Incredible Flying Brick	127	0.6	7th of 10

57th Parliament

Election	Candidate	Votes	% of votes	Result
2018 Lewisham East by-election	Howling Laud Hope	93	0.4	9th of 14
2019 Peterborough by-election	Howling Laud Hope	112	0.3	10th of 15
2019 Brecon and Radnorshire by-election	Lady Lily Pink	334	1.0	5th of 6

58th Parliament

Election	Candidate	Votes	% of votes	Result
2021 Hartlepool by-election	The Incredible Flying Brick	104	0.3	14th of 16
2021 Batley and Spen by-election	Howling Laud Hope	107	0.3	8th of 16
2021 Old Bexley and Sidcup by-election	Mad Mike Young	94	0.4	11th of 11
2021 North Shropshire by-election	Howling Laud Hope	118	0.3	8th of 14
2022 Birmingham Erdington by-election	The Good Knight Sir NosDa	49	0.3	10th of 12
2022 Wakefield by-election	Sir Archibald Stanton Earl 'Eaton	171	0.6	10th of 15
2022 City of Chester by-election	Howling Laud Hope	156	0.6	8th of 9
2023 West Lancashire by-election	Howling Laud Hope	210	0.9	6th of 6
2023 Selby and Ainsty by-election	Sir Archibald Stanton	172	0.5	9th of 13
2023 Uxbridge and South Ruislip by-election	Howling Laud Hope	32	0.1	16th of 17
2023 Tamworth by-election	Howling Laud Hope	155	0.6	8th of 9
2023 Mid Bedfordshire by-election	Ann Kelly	249	0.6	7th of 13
2024 Wellingborough by-election	Nick the Flying Brick	217	0.7	9th of 11
2024 Rochdale by-election	Ravin Rodent Subortna	209	0.7	11th of 11
2024 Blackpool South by-election	Howling Laud Hope	121	0.7	8th of 9

59th Parliament

Election	Candidate	Votes	% of votes	Result
2025 Runcorn and Helsby by-election	Howling Laud Hope	128	0.39	11th of 15
2026 Gorton and Denton by-election	Sir Oink A-Lot	159	0.43	6th of 11
2026 Makerfield by-election	Howling Laud Hope	45	0.10	8th of 14
2026 Clacton by-election	Nick The Incredible Flying Brick	28	0.08	22nd of 34
2026 Clacton by-election	Howling Laud Hope	18	0.05	25th of 34
2026 Clacton by-election	Baron Von Thunderclap	15	0.04	28th of 34

=== Parish and town councillors ===
As of 2021, the party has seven parish and town councillors, one via the Molesey Residents Association.

Councillor	Council
Howling Laud Hope (Cllr Alan Hope)	Fleet Town Council, Hampshire
Baron Von Thunderclap	Bolney Parish, West Sussex
Monkey the Drummer	Molesey Parish, Surrey
Norm the Storm	West Grinstead and Partridge Green Parish, West Sussex
Sarah Mad Cow	Lower Carlton Parish, Lincolnshire
Sir Giles Greenwood	Kemberton Parish, Shropshire
The Iconic Arty Pole	Great Carlton Parish, Lincolnshire

=== 2010 William Hill branding ===
For the 2010 general election, the OMRLP used the description "Monster Raving Loony William Hill Party". John Cartwright, Loony candidate in Croydon, publicly stated that he "[was] not and will not be a mercenary, or an advert, for a commercial company during the course of the election campaign."

== Membership ==
The statement of accounts for the period 1 January to 31 December 2024 outlines membership at 457. It currently costs £15 per year for membership, which includes a party rosette, a certificate of insanity, a Loony badge, a party membership card and a letter from the party's leader. A £20 membership is available for those overseas.

Sir Patrick Moore (1923–2012), the British TV amateur astronomer, was the finance minister of the party for a short time. He once said that the Monster Raving Loony Party "had an advantage over all the other parties, in that they knew they were loonies".

In 1992, the Glasgow band Hugh Reed and the Velvet Underpants released the song "Vote Monster Raving Looney", despite not having any actual ties to the party.

== Policies and electoral strategy ==
The OMRLP are distinguished by having a deliberately bizarre manifesto, which contains things that seem to be impossible or too absurd to implement – usually to highlight what they see as real-life absurdities. Despite its satirical nature, some of the policies that have featured in Loony manifestos have actually become law, such as "passports for pets", abolition of dog licences and all-day pub openings. Other suggestions so far unadopted included minting a 99p coin and forbidding greyhound racing to "stop the country going to the dogs".

The Loonies generally field as many candidates as possible in United Kingdom general elections, some (but by no means all) standing under ridiculous names they have adopted via deed poll. Sutch himself stood against all three main party leaders (John Major, Neil Kinnock and Paddy Ashdown) in the 1992 general election. Parliamentary candidates have to pay their own deposit (which currently stands at £500) and cover all of their expenses. No OMRLP candidate has managed to get the required 5% of the popular vote needed to retain their deposit, but this does not stop people standing. Sutch came closest with 4.2% and over 1,100 votes at the 1994 Rotherham by-election, while Stuart Hughes still holds the record for the largest number of votes for a Loony candidate at a parliamentary election, with 1,442 at the 1992 general election in the Honiton seat in east Devon. The all-time highest vote achieved was by comedian Danny Blue, who secured 3,339 votes in the 1994 European elections under the pseudonym of "John Major". Bamford had also acted as an election agent for Lindi St Clair's rival Corrective Party, and was a former close associate of Stuart Hughes.

In the run-up to the 2011 Alternative Vote referendum, the party adopted an equivocal stance, advising its supporters, on 8 April, to "vote as you see fit". In response to mainstream parties debating Brexit, the OMRLP suggested sending Noel Edmonds to the European Parliament "because he understands Deal or No Deal". It has advocated an "al dente Brexit" rather than a hard or soft Brexit.

== In popular culture ==
Screaming Lord Sutch appeared as himself in the opening episode of television sitcom The New Statesman, standing for election in the seat of Haltemprice, which was won by Alan B'Stard for the Conservative Party. Sutch and his party polled second, ahead of Labour and the SDP.

The party's regular appearances at by-elections were satirised in the Blackadder the Third episode "Dish and Dishonesty", with a candidate from the Standing at the Back Dressed Stupidly and Looking Stupid Party standing as one of Baldrick's rivals in a by-election held in a rotten borough.

A candidate was shown canvassing for a by-election on the One Foot in the Grave episode "I'll Retire to Bedlam" where a regional news programme filmed him knocking on the Meldrews' door. He explained the nature of the party, that they had some clearly set out policies, and that people could choose to vote for them as a protest vote; all while dressed vaguely as a bee. Later in the episode, another candidate for one of the major parties was shaking hands with patients in hospital, then came up to Victor to shake his hand and asked if Victor would be voting for him. Victor replied that he would be voting for the Monster Raving Loony Party and that he found their political platform the most sensible of all the major parties.

== See also ==
- List of frivolous political parties

== Bibliography ==
- Life As Sutch – Lord David Sutch (ghost written by Peter Chippendale), Angus & Robertson 1991 (Expanded Edition 1992) ISBN 0-207-17240-4
