= Pinkerton's Assorted Colours =

English pop band

- Also known as: Pinkerton's Colours; Pinkertons
- Origin: Rugby, Warwickshire, England
- Genres: Beat, pop
- Years active: 1964–1969
- Labels: Decca; Pye
- Past members: Tony Newman; Samuel "Pinkerton" Kempe; David Holland; Barrie Bernard; Tom Long; Stuart Colman; Steve Jones; Paul Bridge-Wilkinson; Michael Summerson; Philip Clough; Peter Robbins; Martyn "Stalky" Gleeson; Terry Stevenson; Alan Baldwin

Pinkerton's Assorted Colours were an English pop band active during the 1960s. They are best known for their 1965 release, "Mirror, Mirror", which reached No. 9 in the UK Singles Chart in February 1966.

== Career ==
Formed in Rugby, Warwickshire as 'The Liberators', they became The Wild Ones between 1962 and 1965, then changed the band name again to Pinkerton's Assorted Colours in 1965, and scored a Top 10 hit with their first single release, "Mirror, Mirror" co-written with Terry Stevenson and sung by band member Tony Newman. They were managed by Reginald Calvert, and supported by his then radio station, Radio City. Lack of further chart success found them dubbed one-hit wonders.

Stuart Colman, Pinkerton’s one time bassist, went on to become a BBC Radio One DJ, and later a producer for Shakin' Stevens, Cliff Richard and Billy Fury.

After their second single they shortened their name to 'Pinkerton's Colours', then to 'Pinkertons'. In 1969, following several lineup changes, they reformed as The Flying Machine, who also became one-hit wonders, albeit in the United States.

Band member Barrie Bernard later played in Jigsaw. Drummer David Holland left the band in 1968 to form Trapeze, and later became successful as the drummer for Judas Priest.

== Members ==
- Tony Newman (born 1947, Rugby) – vocals, guitars
- Samuel "Pinkerton" Kempe (born 1946, Rugby) – vocals, autoharp
- David Holland (born 5 April 1948, Northampton – died 16 January 2018, Spain) – drums
- Barrie Bernard (born 27 November 1944, Coventry) – bass guitar
- Tom Long (born 2 November 1945 Rugby) – lead guitar
- Stuart Colman (born Ian Stuart Colman, 19 December 1944, Harrogate, Yorkshire – died 19 April 2018) – bass, electric piano
- Steve Jones (born 1946, Coventry) – lead guitar, vocals (not to be confused with The Sex Pistols' guitarist)
- Paul Bridge-Wilkinson (known as Paul Wilkinson) (born 1948, Coventry) – drums, vocals
- Michael Summerson (born October 1950 – died February 2016) – bass guitar, vocals
- Philip Clough (born November 1947) – lead guitar, vocals
- Peter Robbins (born February 1959) – drums, vocals
- Martyn "Stalky" Gleeson (born February 1955) – drums
- Terry Stevenson (born 1945) – drums
- Alan Baldwin – lead guitar

== Discography ==
=== Singles ===
- "Mirror, Mirror" b/w "She Don't Care" 1965 – No. 9 UK, New Zealand 11
- "Don't Stop Loving Me Baby" b/w "Will Ya" 1966 – No. 50 UK
- "Magic Rockin' Horse" b/w "It Ain't Right" 1966 – No. 56 UK (Note: Chart position is from the official UK "Breakers List".)
- "Mum And Dad" b/w "On A Street Car" 1967
- "There's Nobody I'd Sooner Love" b/w "Duke's Jetty" 1968
- "Kentucky Woman" b/w "Behind The Mirror" 1968

== See also ==
- List of artists under the Decca Records label
