= Hugh Reid =

Hugh Reid may refer to:

- Hugh Reid (baseball), American baseball outfielder
- Hugh Thompson Reid, American lawyer, railroad executive and general
- Hugh Reid (politician), British politician and newspaper proprietor
- Hugh Reid (cricketer), Canadian cricketer

== See also ==
- Hugh Reed and the Velvet Underpants, a cult Glasgow-based band
- Hughie Reed, Scottish footballer
