= Lord Sutch and Heavy Friends =

Studio album by Screaming Lord Sutch
- Released: February 1970 (U.S.); 25 May 1970 (UK)
- Recorded: May–September 1969
- Studios: Mystic Studios (Hollywood, California); Olympic Studios (London)
- Genre: Rock
- Length: 35:15
- Label: Cotillion
- Producers: Jimmy Page; Lord Sutch

Screaming Lord Sutch chronology
Lord Sutch and Heavy Friends (1970)	Hands of Jack the Ripper (1972)

Professional ratings
Review scores
Source	Rating
AllMusic	3/5 stars
Record Collector	3/5 stars
Rolling Stone	(negative)

Lord Sutch and Heavy Friends is the debut studio album by the English rock singer Screaming Lord Sutch. Recording began in May 1969 at Mystic Studios in Hollywood and it was released on Cotillion Records in 1970. The album featured an all-star line-up with contributions from Led Zeppelin's Jimmy Page (who also produced the album) and John Bonham, guitarist Jeff Beck, session keyboardist Nicky Hopkins, session guitarist Deniel Edwards and Jimi Hendrix Experience bassist Noel Redding. Rick Brown and Carlo Little were previously with the Savages. Lord Sutch and Heavy Friends was named in a 1998 BBC poll as the worst album of all time, a status it also held in Colin Larkin's book The Top 1000 Albums of All Time.

This album has also been released under the name Smoke and Fire. A CD release under the latter name appeared on the Magnum Music Group label sometime in the 1980s, evidently mastered from a vinyl copy of the original album. The cover credits Page, Beck, Bonham, Redding, and Hopkins.

== Track listing ==
=== Side one ===
1. "Wailing Sounds" (Jimmy Page, Sutch) – 2:38
2. "'Cause I Love You" (John Bonham, Deniel Edwards, Jimmy Page, Sutch) – 2:46
3. "Flashing Lights" (Jimmy Page, Sutch) – 3:14
4. "Gutty Guitar" (Sutch) – 2:33
5. "Would You Believe" (Jay Cee) – 3:20
6. "Smoke and Fire" (Sutch) – 2:38

=== Side two ===
1. "Thumping Beat" (Jimmy Page, Sutch) – 3:07
2. "Union Jack Car" (Jimmy Page, Sutch) – 3:03
3. "One for You, Baby" (Sutch) – 2:44
4. "L-O-N-D-O-N" (Sutch) – 2:56
5. "Brightest Light" (Jay Cee, Sutch) – 3:57
6. "Baby, Come Back" (Jimmy Page, Sutch) – 2:31

== Personnel ==
- Screaming Lord Sutch – lead vocals
- Jimmy Page – acoustic and electric guitar (on tracks 1–3, 5, 7, 8, 11, 12), backing vocals, producer
- Jeff Beck – electric guitar (on tracks 4, 5, 11)
- John Bonham – drums (on tracks 1–3, 7, 8, 11, 12), percussion, backing vocals
- Nicky Hopkins – piano, keyboards (on tracks 4, 5, 11)
- Kent Henry – guitar (on tracks 5, 6, 9–11)
- Noel Redding – bass guitar (on tracks 7, 9–11)
- Rick Brown – bass guitar (on tracks 4, 5, 11)
- Deniel Edwards – lead guitar and bass guitar (1–3, 5, 6, 8, 11, 12)
- Martin Kohl – bass guitar (on tracks 5, 6, 9–11)
- Carlo Little – drums (on tracks 4–6)
- Bob Metke – drums (on tracks 6, 9, 10)

Technical

- Tommy Caccetta – engineer
- Edgar Blackeney, Lord Sutch – album design
- Baron Robbins – cover photography

== Charts ==
Chart (1970)	Peak position
Australia (Kent Music Report)	16
US Billboard Top LPs	84

== Reception ==
Many of the musicians had grave misgivings upon its release. They were under the assumption these were demo-quality recordings. As a result, the artists disowned the project and the album sold poorly. It also seriously damaged Sutch's reputation with the musicians involved. "I just went down to have a laugh, playing some old rock 'n' roll, a bit of a send-up. The whole joke sort of reversed itself and became ugly," Jimmy Page said of the record.

A reviewer in Rolling Stone called Sutch "absolutely terrible" and lamented that the celebrated musicians involved were made to sound "like a fouled parody of themselves".

Lord Sutch and Heavy Friends was named in a 1998 BBC poll as the worst album of all time, a status it also held in Colin Larkin's All Time Top 1000 Albums 3rd Edition (2000).

== Additional information ==
Catalogue: Atlantic 2400 008 (UK), Cotillion SD 9015 (US)
