= Marine, &c., Broadcasting (Offences) Act 1967 =

Act of the Parliament of the United Kingdom

Marine, &c., Broadcasting (Offences) Act 1967 (Note: Section 11(1).)
- Act of Parliament
- Parliament of the United Kingdom
- Long title: An Act to suppress broadcasting from ships, aircraft and certain marine structures.
- Citation: 1967 c. 41
- Territorial extent: United Kingdom

Dates
- Royal assent: 14 July 1967
- Commencement: 15 August 1967 (Note: Section 11(2). The Marine, &c., Broadcasting (Offences) Act 1967 (Commencement) Order 1967 (SI 1967/1149).)
- Repealed: 8 February 2007
Other legislation
Transposes	European Agreement for the Prevention of Broadcasts Transmitted from Stations outside National Territories
Amended by	British Nationality Act 1981; Hong Kong (British Nationality) Order 1986; Territorial Sea Act 1987; Copyright, Designs and Patents Act 1988; Broadcasting Act 1990; Reserve Forces Act 1996 (Consequential Provisions etc.) Regulations 1998; Justice (Northern Ireland) Act 2002; Communications Act 2003
Repealed by	Wireless Telegraphy Act 2006
Relates to	Wireless Telegraphy Act 1949

Status: Repealed

Text of statute as originally enacted

Revised text of statute as amended

The Marine, &c., Broadcasting (Offences) Act 1967 (c. 41), shortened to Marine Broadcasting Offences Act or Marine Offences Act, was an act of the Parliament of the United Kingdom that came into force on 15 August 1967. It was subsequently amended by the Wireless Telegraphy Act 2006 and the Broadcasting Act 1990. Its purpose was to extend the powers of the Wireless Telegraphy Act 1949 (which was incorporated by this act), beyond the territorial land area and territorial waters of the UK to cover airspace and external bodies of water.

The act represented the UK's implementation of the 1965 "European Agreement for the Prevention of Broadcasts Transmitted from Stations outside National Territories" (sometimes referred to as the "Council of Europe Strasbourg Convention" or "Strasbourg Treaty").

At the time that the bill was introduced in Parliament in 1966, there were radio stations and proposals for television stations outside British licensing jurisdiction with signals aimed at Britain. These stations were anchored at sea but there were press reports of stations broadcasting from aircraft – Caroline TV, and from a ship – Radex TV.

The act was extended to the Channel Islands and the Isle of Man in September 1967. The act meant that the operation of offshore, pirate radio stations became illegal if they were operated or assisted by persons subject to UK law. It prohibited "carrying by water or air goods or persons to or from it" which made tendering illegal. Station operators thought they could continue if they were staffed, supplied and funded by non-British citizens, but this largely proved impractical.

== Origins ==
In 1966, broadcasting in the UK was controlled by the British General Post Office, which had granted exclusive radio broadcasting licences to the British Broadcasting Corporation and television licences to the BBC and 16 regional Independent Television companies.

The power of the GPO covered letters delivered by the Royal Mail, newspapers, books and their printing presses, the encoding of messages on lines used to supply electricity; the electric telegraph, the electric telephone (which was originally deemed an electronic post office); the electric wireless telegraph and the electric wireless telephone which became known as "telephony" and later wireless broadcasting. In the 1920s the GPO had been circumvented by broadcasting from transmitters in countries close to British listeners. World War II terminated these broadcasts except for Radio Luxembourg.

== Broadcasting pressure groups ==
In the 1950s a pressure group campaigned with the help of Winston Churchill to pass the Television Act 1954 that broke the BBC television monopoly by creating ITV. Some members wanted commercial competition to radio but were thwarted by a succession of governments.

By the 1960s, several companies formed in the hope that radio licences would be issued. Radio monopolies in adjoining nations had been broken by transmitters on ships in international waters. The first attempt to broadcast offshore to Britain was by CNBC, an English-language station from the same ship as Radio Veronica broadcasting in Dutch to the Netherlands. CNBC ended transmissions but press reports followed that GBLN, The Voice of Slough, would transmit from a ship with sponsored programming already booked and advertised by Herbert W. Armstrong. GBLN was followed by reports that GBOK was attempting to get on the air from another ship, both ships to be anchored off south-east England. Many in these early ventures were known to each other.

Some of the commercial television group members had registered broadcasting companies and were working to create offshore radio. The first venture was "Project Atlanta" in 1963, which had ties to British political leaders, bankers, the music industry and to Gordon McLendon, who had helped Radio Nord broadcast from a ship off Sweden. When that was put off the air by Swedish law it became available to British entrepreneurs. Before Radio Atlanta got on the air, Radio Caroline began broadcasting in March 1964.

Texas connections to British stations led Don Pierson of Eastland, Texas to promote three American-radio format stations off Britain: Wonderful Radio London or Big L, Swinging Radio England and Britain Radio. By 1966 other stations had come on the air transmitting to Scotland, northern and southern England, or were in the process of doing so. Press reports included rumours of offshore television stations and the brief success of the Dutch REM Island operation called Radio and TV Noordzee heightened the fear of the authorities that de facto unregulated broadcasting was becoming so entrenched due to its popularity that it would not be possible to stop it.

== Existing laws ==
Although these stations maintained sales and management offices in Britain, the transmitters were not under British law. In many instances, the ships were registered in other countries.

== Claims of piracy ==
Parliamentary debates listed several reasons why unlicensed broadcasting should be stopped. Opponents referred to "pirate radio stations". Allegations of piracy included misappropriation of World War II military installations; wavelengths allocated to others and the unauthorised playing of recorded music. Other claims said the vessels were a danger to shipping and that signals could interfere with aircraft and police, fire and ambulance services.

== Timing ==
In 1966, a dispute among offshore radio operators brought the issue of unlicensed radio stations to the fore. Reginald Calvert, operator of Radio City, had refused to pay Radio Caroline's operator Oliver Smedley for a substandard transmitter. Smedley hired some riggers to occupy the Radio City facility (on Shivering Sands, a disused offshore defence fort), and in an altercation at Smedley's house, Smedley killed Calvert. This incident strengthened the position of the Labour government of Harold Wilson, who wanted to bring the pirate stations under control, enough to see the passage of the Marine Broadcasting Offences Act on 15 August 1967.

== Application to Crown Dependencies ==
Marine, &c., Broadcasting (Offences) (Guernsey) Order 1967
- Statutory Instrument
- Parliament of the United Kingdom
- Citation: SI 1967/1274
- Territorial extent: Guernsey

Dates
- Made: 23 August 1967
- Commencement: 1 September 1967
Other legislation
Made under	Marine, &c., Broadcasting (Offences) Act 1967

Text of statute as originally enacted

Marine, &c., Broadcasting (Offences) (Jersey) Order 1967
- Statutory Instrument
- Parliament of the United Kingdom
- Citation: SI 1967/1275
- Territorial extent: Jersey

Dates
- Made: 23 August 1967
- Commencement: 1 September 1967
Other legislation
Made under	Marine, &c., Broadcasting (Offences) Act 1967

Text of statute as originally enacted

Marine, &c., Broadcasting (Offences) (Isle of Man) Order 1967
- Statutory Instrument
- Parliament of the United Kingdom
- Citation: SI 1967/126
- Territorial extent: Isle of Man

Dates
- Made: 2 August 1967
- Commencement: 1 September 1967
Other legislation
Made under	Marine, &c., Broadcasting (Offences) Act 1967

Text of statute as originally enacted

The UK parliament generally only extends laws to Crown Dependencies with the consent of the local legislatures. The Isle of Man, supply base for Radio Caroline, initially rejected the 1967 law, but the legislation was extended to it anyway by an Order in Council, along with the other dependencies. This resulted in some protests and talk of independence in the Manx legislature, but no consequential action.

- Marine, &c., Broadcasting (Offences) (Guernsey) Order 1967 (SI 1967/1274)
- Marine, &c., Broadcasting (Offences) (Jersey) Order 1967 (SI 1967/1275)
- Marine, &c., Broadcasting (Offences) (Isle of Man) Order 1967 (SI 1967/126)

== Results ==
The offshore stations fell into four groups:

- Local operators of small stations such as Radio Essex and Radio City who conducted their businesses with limited budgets primarily from disused forts on offshore sandbars, plus the similarly based larger operation, Radio 390. The UK silenced these stations by bringing the sandbars within UK waters.
- Regional operators such as Radio 270 and Radio Scotland who lacked the resources to relocate to other countries and staff their operations with non-British personnel.
- The ship based stations of Wonderful Radio London, Swinging Radio England and Britain Radio. While Wonderful Radio London made money, the others had lost so they closed ahead of the law to save further expense. Radio London continued broadcasting until its last transmission on the eve of the new law.
- The Radio Caroline ships announced they would move to Holland, with an advertising office in New York City. The reality was felt in early 1968 when two tugs representing the company supplying the ships with food, fuel, water, and spares towed the vessels away to satisfy debts.

== Continuing challenges ==
Although challenges began with Radio North Sea International in 1970, the British governments (both Labour, then Conservative) jammed it until it moved to a position off the Netherlands. There was no Dutch equivalent of the act until 1974; upon its introduction, RNI closed.

Radio Caroline returned through the 1970s using the MV Mi Amigo, a vessel that sank in 1980, then returned with a new ship, the MV Ross Revenge, in 1983, primarily conducted with volunteer help. For much of this period Caroline's ships also hosted Dutch-language stations whose revenue, along with that of American evangelical broadcasts, kept the station on the air.

In 1984 Caroline was joined by Laser 558 another station with American backing, and while the latter gained a huge audience, the legislation plus a sea embargo monitoring supplies out to its ship, MV Communicator, drove its operators into insolvency as well as putting additional pressure on Caroline. An attempt to revive Laser under new management only lasted a few months from 1986 to 1987. The arrival of Laser had increased knowledge of Caroline's presence, and its closure plus a change in Caroline's music policy resulted in an increase in their younger audience.

Further amendments to the act had resulted in Radio Caroline having to move its operations into wilder water, and the Great Storm of 1987 damaged their antenna tower, which collapsed a few weeks later. A smaller antenna system was built but was less efficient. The Dutch and British governments then raided the Radio Caroline ship and removed much of its equipment, but again it limped back onto the air until late 1990 when, with its funding running low, the final amendment to the act, instigating a 200-mile limit, came into effect. Attempts to secure more funding proved futile, and thereafter it pursued legal means of broadcasting.

== Further developments ==
BBC Radio 1 launched in September 1967, with the goal of filling the gap created by the absence of pirate radio stations, though Radio 1 did not play heavier rock or soul music by Black artists.

=== Apparent conclusion of unlicensed British offshore radio ===
The end of the offshore Radio Caroline came when the Broadcasting Act 1990, which built on all similar and related legislation, together with a storm that caused its staff temporarily to abandon the ship, caused the station to come ashore in 1991, where enthusiasts continue to build a broadcasting business using the new licensing system available to British broadcasters.

== Similar legislation in other countries ==
Denmark 1962, Belgium 1962, Ireland 1968, France 1969, Netherlands 1974.

== See also ==
- Wireless Telegraphy Act
- The Boat That Rocked
