= S. W. Alexander =

English journalist and political activist

S. W. Alexander

Stanley Walter "S. W." Alexander MBE (16 November 1895 – 23 March 1980) was a British journalist and political activist.

== Early life ==
During the First World War, Alexander served as a Sergeant Major in the Princess Patricia's Canadian Light Infantry, as he was unable to join the British forces as his height was only 5'1". He was made a Member of the Order of the British Empire in 1918 (investiture 15 November 1919), and in 1919 married Doris Emily Kibble, whom he had met in the offices of Lord Beaverbrook. They had two sons, Andrew and Colin.

== Journalism and politics ==
He was a journalist for the Beaverbrook press, being City Editor of the Sunday Express, Daily Express and Evening Standard. From 1948 he was editor of the City Press newspaper. He was instrumental in founding the Society for Individual Freedom and Oliver Smedley described himself and Alexander as "the only active free-traders left in England in the 1950s". He debated at the Cambridge Union with Lord Longford over the Beveridge Report in January 1943. He stood in the 1945 general election as an Independent Free Trade candidate (coming fourth) for City of London. He stood in the 1950 general election for the Liberal Party (coming third) for Ilford North. He was also chairman of the London Liberal Party. He was also against British membership of the Common Market.

== Political views ==
Alexander was a believer in free trade, writing letters to The Times on this and other economic subjects. He believed that the abandonment of free trade in 1917 began "the lowering of the standard of life by stopping goods reaching people" and that it was responsible for "the closed market behind which monopolies and price rings of labour and capital have grown up".

He argued for the restoration of free trade "regardless of what other nations may do" and asked: "...does the housewife improve her position by buying the poorest quality goods at the highest price or not? The future of the pound is inextricably bound up with this question of restoring to the people the right to buy in the cheapest market".

Alexander opposed collectivism and socialism and argued for more units of industry to combat them: "Over a period of 40 years the policy of "protection" has concentrated industry in fewer hands and helped to create monopolies which in turn has encouraged the Socialists to believe that the way to deal with monopolies is for the State to take them over...a policy of free trade...will provide the conditions under which more units will grow up...With more units we shall also get a larger number of responsible individuals with political independence".

Alexander believed that protectionism, by fostering monopolies and nationalisation, would (if not reversed) lead to a totalitarian state: "Free Trade is a great safeguard for all the other liberties of the people and it can play a most valuable part in promoting good will among the peoples and world peace".

He contended that the best argument for foreign investment was "the natural right of Englishmen to do what they think is to the best advantage with their own money. Where responsibility for profit or loss resides with the individual there will the best results of investment be achieved".

"Protectionism", Alexander wrote, "is akin to socialism and no free enterprise political party in an island nation dependent for its life on international trading should ever have had anything to do with it...capital and labour need a return to the natural disciplines...[these] can only be restored as a result of a balanced national budget, a limitation on the volume of circulating paper money of all kinds, and the abandonment of import restrictions and duties so that all home production in cost and quality is constantly challenged by the alternative of the product from overseas".

On imports, he argued against Sir Roy Harrod's proposals for protectionism: "Excessive imports arise as a result of an excessive volume of purchasing power introduced into the community as a result of excessive Government spending. That is the basic cause of the trouble. That is where the remedy should begin...The answer to the problem is not to impose import restrictions but to completely free imports and so conduct our internal affairs as to balance budgets, provide for the repayment of debt and thereby automatically limit the ability to pay for imports as near as possible to those imports that can be most profitably used".

Alexander also advocated abolishing all exchange controls so that "individuals could freely carry on their business and even use their automatically reduced resources even to resume their profitable overseas investment which has stood our people in good stead in two world wars. The need is to create the conditions of freedom in which new wealth can be accumulated".

He argued against Sir Alec Douglas-Home's view that going into the Common Market would provide a larger market for British industry: "The greatest handicap to British industry is not that we have not a sufficiently large market but that owing to the protectionist policy now pursued for 50 years our people are not allowed to buy raw materials and goods from the cheapest market. And, if we cannot buy cheaply we cannot produce competitively. That has been the primary cause of our country's decline in its share of world trade and shipping...Entry into Europe would I believe be but an extension of that protectionism which has already done immense damage to our country".

== Publications ==
- The Economic War (1932)
- Tariffs Mean War (1933)
- Justice for All Workers (1936)
- The Price we Pay (1940)
- The Kingdom of Bevin (1941)
- Save the pound, save the people: The cause of Britain's current crisis, and the only way to recovery (Anti Dear Food Campaign, 1974; Cobden Club, 1975)
- Montagu Norman versus Beaverbrook (1976)
