= Catmando =

British cat, satirical party joint leader (1995–2002)

- Catmando (left) and Howling Laud Hope

Leader of the Official Monster Raving Loony Party
- In office 1999–2002 Serving with Howling Laud Hope
- Preceded by: Screaming Lord Sutch
- Succeeded by: Howling Laud Hope (as sole leader)

Personal details
- Born: 1995 Mytchett, Surrey, England
- Died: 2002 (aged 7)
- Party: Official Monster Raving Loony Party

Catmando (1995–2002; also spelled "Cat Mandu") was a cat named "joint leader" of Britain's Official Monster Raving Loony Party (OMRLP) from 1999 to 2002, along with his owner, party chairman Howling Laud Hope. He died in 2002, serving as leader until his death.

== Life and career ==
Following the 1999 death of the party's founder, Screaming Lord Sutch, the OMRLP held a leadership election with Alan "Howling Laud" Hope (who was then the party's chairman and deputy leader) and Catmando as the only two candidates. The vote was a tie, with Hope and Catmando each receiving 125 votes. Hope, as the party chairman, had the deciding vote, and decided that he and Catmando should serve as joint leaders.

During Catmando's time as joint leader, the OMRLP saw its greatest electoral performance to date, fielding 15 candidates in the 2001 general election. Catmando served as joint leader until his death as a result of a traffic accident in July 2002. Hope then became the party's sole leader.

Following Catmando's death, the party proposed that there should be cat-crossings on all major roads.

== Name origins ==
Catmando was originally called "Catman". His name was changed after a customer at the Golden Lion (Hope's pub and guesthouse in Ashburton, Devon) asked a music question that Hope could not answer; the customer commented: "I bet Catman do [know the answer]". Consequently, he became "Catmando".

The cat later moved with Hope to the Dog and Partridge public house in Yateley, Hampshire. Gurkhas, stationed nearby at Aldershot, were intrigued by a name that sounded like the Nepalese capital Kathmandu; subsequently the cat became the subject of a front-page feature in the Nepali Times. The "Cat Mandu" spelling became common through media misinterpretation, but Hope has confirmed that "Catmando" is the correct spelling.

== See also ==
- Non-human electoral candidates
- List of individual cats

Party political offices
Preceded by Screaming Lord Sutch	Official Monster Raving Loony Party Leader; 1999–2002; With: Howling Laud Hope	Succeeded by Howling Laud Hope
