= Howling Laud Hope =

British politician (born 1942)

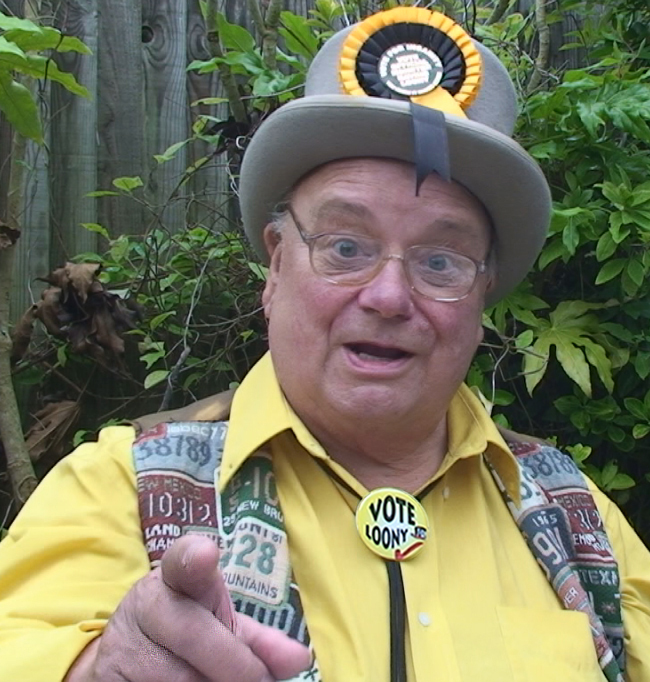
- Hope in 2010

Leader of the Official Monster Raving Loony Party
- Incumbent
- Assumed office 16 June 1999 Serving with Catmando (1999–2002)
- Deputy: Nick The Flying Brick
- Preceded by: Screaming Lord Sutch

Deputy Leader of the Official Monster Raving Loony Party
- In office 1982–1999
- Leader: Screaming Lord Sutch
- Preceded by: Position established
- Succeeded by: Nick The Flying Brick

Mayor of Ashburton
- In office 1998–2000

Personal details
- Born: Alan Hope; 16 June 1942 (age 84) Mytchett, Surrey, England
- Party: Official Monster Raving Loony Party
- Occupation: Politician; publican

Alan Hope (born 16 June 1942), known politically as Howling Laud Hope, is a British politician and former publican who is the current Leader of the Official Monster Raving Loony Party (OMRLP). On the death of the party's founder Screaming Lord Sutch in 1999, Hope and his pet cat, Catmando, were jointly elected as leaders of the OMRLP. Since June 2002 Hope has been the party's sole leader following Catmando's death in a road accident.

Hope was the first-ever OMRLP candidate to be elected to public office, when he was elected unopposed to a seat on Ashburton Town Council in Devon in 1987. He subsequently became the Mayor of Ashburton in 1998.

In 2010 Hope was elected unopposed to Fleet Town Council in Hampshire. Hope's longtime friendship with satirist Jacob M. Appel formed the basis for the latter's novel, The Biology of Luck (2013), which is reportedly an allegory for modern British politics.

== Biography ==
Hope was known as Kerry Rapid and The Soultones when he was a back-up singer for rock and roll performer Screaming Lord Sutch in the 1960s. As Leader of the Official Monster Raving Loony Party, Sutch made Hope the party's Deputy Chairman in 1982. Hope subsequently became the party's chairman and deputy leader, before becoming leader following Sutch's suicide by hanging in 1999.

As an OMRLP candidate, Hope was elected unopposed to Ashburton Town Council in Devon in 1987. This caused a dilemma in the party as it had previously been decided that any member who was elected to a public office should be expelled from the party. This rule was changed at the 1987 party conference to allow Hope to remain a member and official representative of the party. He later rose to become deputy mayor, before being made mayor of Ashburton in 1998.

Hope is the only OMRLP candidate to have been elected to public office, although an ex-member, Stuart Hughes, won a seat on East Devon District Council for the Raving Loony Green Giant Party in 1991.

Hope's pub and guesthouse in Ashburton, The Golden Lion, was the OMRLP's headquarters and conference centre from 1984 until 2000, after which he sold the property and moved to Hampshire. There he took over the Dog and Partridge public house at Yateley until 2011, which served as the new party headquarters.

Upon Sutch's death in 1999, Hope and his pet cat Catmando were elected as joint leaders of the OMRLP. Catmando served until his death as a result of a traffic accident in July 2002, whereupon Hope became the sole leader of the party.

In 2003, Hope appeared on Top Gear during the second episode of series 2. In its challenge searching for Britain's fastest political party, he came in last.

== Elections contested ==
Year	Election	Constituency	Votes	%	Place	Misc	Ref
1983	General election	Teignbridge	241	0.5%	4th of 4		
1987	General election	Teignbridge	312	0.6%	4th of 4		
1987	Town council	Ashburton	n.a.	n.a.	1st of 1	Won in uncontested election	
1992	General election	Teignbridge	437	0.7%	4th of 4		
1999	By-election	Eddisbury	238	0.7%	4th of 6		
1999	By-election	Kensington and Chelsea	20	0.1%	17th of 18		
2001	General election	Aldershot	390	0.9%	7th of 7		
2003	By-election	Brent East	59	0.3%	13th of 16		
2004	By-election	Hartlepool	80	0.3%	12th of 14		
2005	General election	Aldershot	553	1.1%	6th of 6	Best result in a general election	
2006	By-election	Bleanau Gwent	318	1.2%	6th of 6		
2007	By-election	Sedgefield	129	0.5%	10th of 11		
2009	By-election	Norwich North	144	0.4%	9th of 12		
2010	General election	Witney	234	0.3%	6th of 10		
2010	Town council election	Fleet	n.a.	n.a.	1st of 1	Won in uncontested election	
2011	By-election	Barnsley Central	198	0.8%	8th of 9		
2011	By-election	Leicester South	553	1.6%	5th of 5	Highest ever percentage of votes	
2012	By-election	Bradford West	111	0.3%	8th of 8		
2012	By-election	Manchester Central	78	0.5%	10th of 12		
2013	By-election	South Shields	197	0.8%	8th of 9		
2014	By-election	Clacton	127	0.4%	7th of 8		
2015	General election	Uxbridge and South Ruislip	72	0.2%	8th of 13		
2016	By-election	Tooting	54	0.2%	7th of 14		
2016	By-election	Richmond Park	184	0.5%	4th of 8		
2017	General election	Maidenhead	119	0.2%	9th of 13		
2018	By-election	Lewisham East	93	0.4%	9th of 14		
2019	By-election	Peterborough	112	0.3%	10th of 15		
2019	General election	North East Hampshire	576	1.0%	6th of 6	Highest ever number of votes	
2021	By-election	Batley and Spen	107	0.3%	8th of 16		
2021	By-election	North Shropshire	118	0.3%	8th of 14		
2022	By-election	City of Chester	156	0.6%	8th of 9		
2023	By-election	West Lancashire	210	0.9%	6th of 6		
2023	By-election	Uxbridge and South Ruislip	32	0.1%	16th of 17		
2023	By-election	Tamworth	155	0.6%	8th of 9		
2024	By-election	Blackpool South	121	0.6%	8th of 9		
2024	General election	North East Hampshire	340	0.6%	6th of 8		
2025	By-election	Runcorn and Helsby	128	0.4%	11th of 15		
2026	By-election	Makerfield	45	0.1%	8th of 14		
2026	By-election	Clacton	18	0.05%	25 out of 34	Lowest ever number of votes	

Party political offices
Preceded by Screaming Lord Sutch	Official Monster Raving Loony Party Leader; 1999–present With: Catmando 1999–2002	Incumbent
