= List of statutory instruments of the United Kingdom, 1967 =

This is an incomplete list of statutory instruments of the United Kingdom in 1967.

== Statutory instruments ==
=== 1-499 ===
- Teachers (Colleges of Education) (Scotland) Regulations 1967 (SI 1967/29)
- Sheffield Order 1967 (SI 1967/104)
- Marine, &c., Broadcasting (Offences) (Isle of Man) Order 1967 (SI 1967/126)
- Commonwealth Countries and Republic of Ireland (Immunities) Order 1967 (SI 1967/160)
- Temporary Restrictions on Pay Increases (20th July 1966 Levels) (No. 3) Order 1967 (SI 1967/216)
- Diplomatic Privileges (Citizens of the United Kingdom and Colonies) (Amendment) Order 1967 (SI 1967/474)
- Carriage by Air (Convention) Order 1967 (SI 1967/479) (C.8)
- Carriage by Air Acts (Application of Provisions) Order 1967 (SI 1967/480)
- Transfer of Functions (Miscellaneous) Order 1967 (SI 1967/486)

=== 500-999 ===
- Ipswich Water (Felixstowe and District) Order 1967 (SI 1967/530)
- Commonwealth Countries and Republic of Ireland (Immunities) (No. 2) Order 1967 (SI 1967/815)
- Carcinogenic Substances Regulations 1967 (SI 1967/879)

=== 1000-1499 ===
- Faculty Jurisdiction Rules 1967 (SI 1967/1002)
- Industrial Training (Rubber and Plastics Processing Board) Order 1967 (SI 1967/1062)
- Coal and Other Mines (Electricity) (Amendment) Regulations 1967 (SI 1967/1083)
- Teachers (Education, Training and Registration) (Scotland) Regulations 1967 (SI 1967/1162)
- Marine, &c., Broadcasting (Offences) (Guernsey) Order 1967 (SI 1967/1274)
- Marine, &c., Broadcasting (Offences) (Jersey) Order 1967 (SI 1967/1275)
- Fugitive Offenders (Extension) Order 1967 (SI 1967/1303)
- Industrial and Provident Societies Regulations 1967 (SI 1967/1310)
- London Authorities (Superannuation) (Amendment) Order 1967 (SI 1967/1330)
- Aberllefeni Mine (Storage Battery Locomotives) Special Regulations 1967 (SI 1967/1395)
- Braich Goch Mine (Storage Battery Locomotives) Special Regulations 1967 (SI 1967/1396)
- Ammonium Nitrate Mixtures Exemption Order 1967 (SI 1967/1485)

=== 1500-1999 ===
- Carcinogenic Substances (Prohibition of Importation) Order 1967 (SI 1967/1675)
- Commonwealth Countries and Republic of Ireland (Immunities) (No. 3) Order 1967 (SI 1967/1902)
- South Cornwall Water Board Order 1967 (SI 1967/1928)
- Holyrood Park (Second Amendment) Regulations 1967 (SI 1967/1935)

== Orders in council not registered as statutory instruments ==
- Officers' Commissions (Army) Order 1967
- Gilbert and Ellice Islands Colony (Electoral Provisions) Order 1967
- Mauritius Compensation and Retiring Benefits Order 1967
- Gibraltar (Referendum) Order 1967
- Gilbert and Ellice Islands Colony (Electoral Provisions) (Amendment) Order 1967
- Mauritius Constitution (Amendment No. 2) Order 1967
- Seychelles (Electoral Provisions) (No. 2) Order 1967
- Seychelles Judicature Order 1967
- Gilbert and Ellice Islands Order 1967

== Sources ==
- Statutory Instruments 1967: Part II. London: Her Majesty's Stationery Office. 1967.

== See also ==
- List of statutory instruments of the United Kingdom
