= 1963 Stratford by-election =

UK parliamentary by-election

The 1963 Stratford by-election was a by-election held on 15 August 1963 for the British House of Commons constituency of Stratford-on-Avon in Warwickshire.

The by-election was caused by the resignation of the constituency's Conservative Party Member of Parliament (MP) John Profumo on 6 June 1963 after the Profumo affair scandal.

The result was a Conservative Party hold, with Angus Maude winning a massively-reduced majority of almost 3,470 votes.

The by-election was the first of many to be contested by David Sutch, later known as "Screaming Lord Sutch".

The date of the election was the same date as the UK release of the film Jason and the Argonauts (1963), in which Labour candidate Andrew Faulds had a substantial role as Argonaut Phalerus.

== Result ==
Stratford by-election, 15 August 1963
Party	Candidate	Votes	%	±%
Conservative	Angus Maude	15,846	43.61	−24.91
Labour	Andrew Faulds	12,376	34.06	+2.57
Liberal	Derick Mirfin	7,622	20.98	New
Independent	M. S. Blair	281	0.77	New
Teenage Party	David Sutch	209	0.58	New
Majority		3,470	9.55	−27.47
Turnout		36,334		
Conservative hold		Swing	−13.7	
