= Wireless Telegraphy Act 2006 =

Act of Parliament of the United Kingdom

Wireless Telegraphy Act 2006 (Note: Section 126(1).)
- Act of Parliament
- Parliament of the United Kingdom
- Long title: An Act to consolidate enactments about wireless telegraphy.
- Citation: 2006 c. 36
- Territorial extent: United Kingdom

Dates
- Royal assent: 8 November 2006
- Commencement: 8 February 2007 (Note: Section 126(2).)
Other legislation
Amends	Port of London Act 1968; Intelligence Services Act 1994; Criminal Procedure (Scotland) Act 1995; Terrorism Act 2000; See § Repealed enactments
Repeals/revokes	See § Repealed enactments
Amended by	Legislative and Regulatory Reform Act 2006; Serious Crime Act 2007; Consumer Protection from Unfair Trading Regulations 2008; Audiovisual Media Services Regulations 2009; Digital Economy Act 2010; Audiovisual Media Services Regulations 2010; Audiovisual Media Services (Codification) Regulations 2010; Treaty of Lisbon (Changes in Terminology) Order 2011; Electronic Communications and Wireless Telegraphy Regulations 2011; Enterprise and Regulatory Reform Act 2013; Police and Fire Reform (Scotland) Act 2012 (Consequential Provisions and Modifications) Order 2013; Enterprise and Regulatory Reform Act 2013 (Competition) (Consequential, Transitional and Saving Provisions) Order 2014; Deregulation Act 2015; Legal Aid, Sentencing and Punishment of Offenders Act 2012 (Fines on Summary Conviction) Regulations 2015; Investigatory Powers Act 2016; Digital Economy Act 2017; Broadcasting (Amendment) (EU Exit) Regulations 2019; Electronic Communications and Wireless Telegraphy (Amendment etc.) (EU Exit) Regulations 2019; Sentencing Act 2020; Audiovisual Media Services Regulations 2020; Electronic Communications and Wireless Telegraphy (Amendment) (European Electronic Communications Code and EU Exit) Regulations 2020; Criminal Justice Act 2003 (Commencement No. 33) and Sentencing Act 2020 (Commencement No. 2) Regulations 2022; Judicial Review and Courts Act 2022 (Magistrates' Court Sentencing Powers) Regulations 2023; Digital Markets, Competition and Consumers Act 2024; Media Act 2024; Digital Markets, Competition and Consumers Act 2024 (Consequential Amendments) Regulations 2025

Status: Amended

History of passage through Parliament

Text of statute as originally enacted

Revised text of statute as amended

The Wireless Telegraphy Act 2006 (c. 36) is an act of the Parliament of the United Kingdom. This act repealed the Wireless Telegraphy Act 1949 (12, 13 & 14 Geo. 6. c. 54).

== Provisions ==
The act states that "the use of any apparatus, whether or not wireless telegraphy apparatus, for the purpose of interfering with any wireless telegraphy, is an offence" and under this provision, Faraday cages are generally legal but electronic jamming devices are generally illegal.

Under the act, mobile repeaters were classified as "radio apparatus".

The act empowered Ofcom to set licence fees for mobile network operators. The act allows Ofcom to authorise spectrum trading.

=== Repealed enactments ===
Sections 125(1) and 125(2) of the act repealed 21 enactments and revoked 10 instruments, listed in parts 1 and 2 of schedule 9 to the act, respectively.

Part 1 - Repeals
Citation	Short title	Extent of repeal
12, 13 & 14 Geo. 6. c. 54	Wireless Telegraphy Act 1949	The whole act.
1967 c. 41	Marine, &c., Broadcasting (Offences) Act 1967	The whole act.
1967 c. 72	Wireless Telegraphy Act 1967	Sections 7 to 12.
1967 c. 72	Wireless Telegraphy Act 1967	In section 13(4) the words from ", and" to the end.
1967 c. 72	Wireless Telegraphy Act 1967	In section 15—(a) subsections (2) and (3), and (b) in subsection (6) the words ", except for section 7 of this Act,".
1969 c. 48	Post Office Act 1969	In section 3—(a) in subsection (1)(a) the words from the beginning to "day and", (b) in subsection (1)(ii) the words ", rules or a licence" and "the Wireless Telegraphy Act 1949 or", and (c) subsection (6).
1981 c. 61	British Nationality Act 1981	In Schedule 7, the paragraph relating to the Marine, &c., Broadcasting (Offences) Act 1967.
1982 c. 48	Criminal Justice Act 1982	Section 50.
1982 c. 48	Criminal Justice Act 1982	In section 81—(a) in subsection (5) the entry relating to section 50, and (b) subsection (12)(c)(v).
1984 c. 12	Telecommunications Act 1984	Part 6.
1984 c. 12	Telecommunications Act 1984	In section 101—(a) in subsection (1)(a) the words "(except Part 6)", (b) in subsection (2)(a) the words "(except functions assigned by or under Part 6)", and (c) in subsection (3)(q) the words from "(excluding" to the end.
1984 c. 12	Telecommunications Act 1984	Section 104(1B) and (1C).
1987 c. 43	Consumer Protection Act 1987	In Schedule 4, paragraph 9(1).
1988 c. 48	Copyright, Designs and Patents Act 1988	In Schedule 7, paragraph 9.
1989 c. 29	Electricity Act 1989	In Schedule 16, paragraph 6.
1990 c. 42	Broadcasting Act 1990	Sections 168 to 174.
1990 c. 42	Broadcasting Act 1990	Section 180(1).
1990 c. 42	Broadcasting Act 1990	Schedule 16.
1990 c. 42	Broadcasting Act 1990	In Schedule 18, in Part 1, paragraphs 1 and 3.
1994 c. 22	Vehicle Excise and Registration Act 1994	In Schedule 3, paragraph 3.
1995 c. 21	Merchant Shipping Act 1995	In Schedule 13, paragraph 24.
1995 c. 40	Criminal Procedure (Consequential Provisions) (Scotland) Act 1995	In Schedule 4, paragraph 48.
1998 c. 6	Wireless Telegraphy Act 1998	The whole act.
2000 c. 6	Powers of Criminal Courts (Sentencing) Act 2000	In Schedule 9, paragraph 92.
2000 c. 23	Regulation of Investigatory Powers Act 2000	Section 73.
2002 c. 26	Justice (Northern Ireland) Act 2002	In Schedule 7, paragraph 25.
2003 c. 21	Communications Act 2003	Sections 152 to 184.
2003 c. 21	Communications Act 2003	In section 393—(a) subsection (1)(b), and (b) subsection (5)(a), (b) and (l).
2003 c. 21	Communications Act 2003	Section 394(2)(c).
2003 c. 21	Communications Act 2003	Section 402(2)(b).
2003 c. 21	Communications Act 2003	Section 404(4)(b) and (c) and (5).
2003 c. 21	Communications Act 2003	In section 407(1)—(a) paragraph (a), and (b) in paragraph (c) the words "(a) or".
2003 c. 21	Communications Act 2003	In Schedule 1, paragraphs 1 and 2.
2003 c. 21	Communications Act 2003	Schedules 5 to 7.
2003 c. 21	Communications Act 2003	In Schedule 8, paragraphs 13 to 36.
2003 c. 21	Communications Act 2003	In Schedule 17—(a) paragraphs 6 to 18, (b) paragraphs 32 to 38, (c) paragraphs 64 to 69, (d) paragraph 72(2), and (e) paragraphs 145 to 151.
2003 c. 21	Communications Act 2003	In Schedule 18—(a) paragraph 6, (b) paragraphs 20 and 21, (c) in paragraph 23, sub-paragraph (1)(c)(i), in sub-paragraph (2) the words "(or that Act of 1949)" and in sub-paragraph (3) the words "section 1F of that Act of 1949 or", (d) paragraph 55, and (e) paragraph 63.
2003 c. 21	Communications Act 2003	In Schedule 19, Notes 1 and 3.
2003 c. 44	Criminal Justice Act 2003	In Schedule 25, paragraph 29.
2005 c. 15	Serious Organised Crime and Police Act 2005	In Schedule 16, paragraph 3.

Part 2 - Revocations
Citation	Title	Extent of revocation
SR & O 1973/256 (N.I.)	Transfer of Functions (Local Government, etc.) (Northern Ireland) Order 1973	In Schedule 1, the entry relating to the Wireless Telegraphy Act 1949.
SR & O 1973/256 (N.I.)	Transfer of Functions (Local Government, etc.) (Northern Ireland) Order 1973	In Schedule 2, the entry relating to the Wireless Telegraphy Act 1949.
SI 1986/948	Hong Kong (British Nationality) Order 1986	In Schedule 1, the paragraph relating to the Marine, &c., Broadcasting (Offences) Act 1967.
SI 1989/1341 (N.I. 12)	Police and Criminal Evidence (Northern Ireland) Order 1989	In Article 26(2), the sub-paragraph (j) relating to section 14(1) of the Wireless Telegraphy Act 1949.
SI 1994/2795 (N.I. 15)	Criminal Justice (Northern Ireland) Order 1994	In Schedule 2, paragraph 10.
SI 1996/1864	Deregulation (Wireless Telegraphy) Order 1996	Article 3.
SI 1997/2930	Telecommunications (Licensing) Regulations 1997	Regulation 4.
SI 1999/679	Transfer of Functions (Lord Advocate and Advocate General for Scotland) Order 1999	In the Schedule, the entry relating to section 14(7) of the Wireless Telegraphy Act 1949.
SI 1999/3180	Telecommunications (Appeals) Regulations 1999	Regulation 4.
SI 2005/886	Courts Act 2003 (Consequential Provisions) Order 2005	In the Schedule, paragraph 95.
SI 2006/1391	Wireless Telegraphy (Pre-Consolidation Amendments) Order 2006	The whole order.

=== Section 126 – Short title and commencement ===
Section 126(2) provides that the act came into force at the end of the period of three months that began on the date on which it was passed. The word "months" means calendar months. The day (that is to say, 8 November 2006) on which the act was passed (that is to say, received royal assent) is included in the period of three months. This means that the act came into force on 8 February 2007.

== See also ==
- Wireless Telegraphy Acts
