= Wireless Telegraphy Acts =

Stock short title used for legislation

Wireless Telegraphy Act is (with its variations) a stock short title used for legislation in the Republic of Ireland, South Africa and the United Kingdom relating to wireless telegraphy.

The Wireless Telegraphy Acts are laws regulating radio communications in the United Kingdom.

Wireless telegraphy as a concept is defined in British law as "the sending of electro-magnetic energy over paths not provided by a material substance."

The term telegraphy, although best known in relation to the electric telegraph, relates to the sending of messages over long-distances. Wireless telegraphy is differentiated from electrical telegraphy in that the messages are transmitted via electromagnetic means (light or radio) rather than via a physical electrical cable connection.

The current (2018) supervisor of the UK's electromagnetic spectrum is the communications regulator, Ofcom.

== List ==
=== Cape Colony (South Africa) ===
- The Electric Telegraphs Amendment Act 1902 (required wireless masts to be licensed)

=== Ireland ===
- The Wireless Telegraphy Act 1904 and 1906 (pre-independence acts repealed in 1926)
- The Wireless Telegraphy Act 1926 (the principal Act)
- The Wireless Telegraphy Act 1956 (concerned with use of radios in vehicles)
- The Broadcasting Authority Act 1960 (established RTÉ and makes amendments to the 1926 Act in relation to television and interference)
- The Broadcasting offences Act 1968 (banned Irish citizens from involvement in offshore radio stations)
- The Wireless Telegraphy Act 1972 (concerned mainly with TV receiver licensing)
- The Broadcasting Authority (Amendment) Act 1976 (amendments concerning cable TV)
- The Broadcasting And Wireless Telegraphy Act 1988 (concerned mainly with unlicensed broadcasting)
- The Broadcasting Act 1990 (amendments concerning cable TV and unauthorised decoding or interception of broadcast services)
- The Broadcasting Act 2009

=== United Kingdom ===
Wireless Telegraphy Act 1904 (Note: Section 3(1).)
- Act of Parliament
- Parliament of the United Kingdom
- Long title: An Act to provide for the regulation of Wireless Telegraphy.
- Citation: 4 Edw. 7. c. 24
- Territorial extent: England and Wales; Scotland; Ireland; Channel Islands; Isle of Man; (Note: Section 3(2).)

Dates
- Royal assent: 15 August 1904
- Commencement: 15 August 1904 (Note: The Acts of Parliament (Commencement) Act 1793.)
- Expired: 31 July 1906 (Note: Section 6.)
- Repealed: 18 July 1973
Other legislation
Amended by	Wireless Telegraphy Act 1906; Wireless Telegraphy (Explanation) Act 1925; Wireless Telegraphy (Blind Persons Facilities) Act 1926
Repealed by	Statute Law (Repeals) Act 1973

Status: Repealed

Text of statute as originally enacted

- The Wireless Telegraphy Act 1904 (4 Edw. 7. c. 24) (subsequently repealed)

Wireless Telegraphy Act 1906 (Note: Section 2.)
- Act of Parliament
- Parliament of the United Kingdom
- Long title: An Act to continue the Wireless Telegraphy Act, 1904,
- Citation: 6 Edw. 7. c. 13
- Territorial extent: United Kingdom

Dates
- Royal assent: 20 July 1906
- Commencement: 20 July 1906
- Repealed: 1 June 1854
Other legislation
Amends	Wireless Telegraphy Act 1904
Repealed by	Wireless Telegraphy Act 1949

Status: Repealed

Text of statute as originally enacted

- The Wireless Telegraphy Act 1906 (6 Edw. 7. c. 13) (subsequently repealed)

Wireless Telegraphy (Explanation) Act 1925
- Act of Parliament
- Parliament of the United Kingdom
- Long title: An Act to explain the meaning of the expressions "transmission" and "rent or royalty" where used in certain provisions of the Wireless Telegraphy Act, 1904.
- Citation: 15 & 16 Geo. 5. c. 67
- Territorial extent: United Kingdom

Dates
- Royal assent: 7 August 1925
- Commencement: 7 August 1925
- Repealed: 18 July 1973
Other legislation
Amends	Wireless Telegraphy Act 1904
Repealed by	Statute Law (Repeals) Act 1973

Status: Repealed

Text of statute as originally enacted

- The Wireless Telegraphy (Explanation) Act 1925 (15 & 16 Geo. 5. c. 67) (subsequently repealed)

Wireless Telegraphy (Blind Persons Facilities) Act 1926 (Note: Section 3.)
- Act of Parliament
- Parliament of the United Kingdom
- Long title: An Act to facilitate the use of wireless telegraphy by the blind.
- Citation: 16 & 17 Geo. 5. c. 54
- Territorial extent: United Kingdom

Dates
- Royal assent: 15 December 1926
- Commencement: 15 December 1926
- Repealed: 18 July 1973
Other legislation
Amended by	Local Government Act 1933
Repealed by	Statute Law (Repeals) Act 1973

Status: Repealed

Text of statute as originally enacted

- The Wireless Telegraphy (Blind Persons Facilities) Act 1926 (16 & 17 Geo. 5. c. 54) (subsequently repealed)

Wireless Telegraphy Act 1949 (Note: Section 20(1).)
- Act of Parliament
- Parliament of the United Kingdom
- Long title: An Act to amend the law relating to wireless telegraphy.
- Citation: 12, 13 & 14 Geo. 6. c. 54
- Territorial extent: United Kingdom (Note: Section 20(2)–(3).)

Dates
- Royal assent: 30 July 1949
- Commencement: 30 July 1949; 8 April 1954 (sections 5, 6 and 8); 1 June 1854 (sections 1–4 and 7); (Note: Section 8. The Wireless Telegraphy Act 1949 (Commencement) Order 1954 (SI 1954/437).)
- Repealed: 8 February 2007
Other legislation
Repeals/revokes	Wireless Telegraphy Act 1904; Wireless Telegraphy Act 1906; Wireless Telegraphy (Explanation) Act 1925; Wireless Telegraphy (Blind Persons Facilities) Act 1926
Amended by	Wireless Telegraphy (Blind Persons) Act 1955; Wireless Telegraphy Act 1967; Statute Law (Repeals) Act 1993; Wireless Telegraphy Act 1998; Regulation of Investigatory Powers Act 2000
Repealed by	Wireless Telegraphy Act 2006

Status: Repealed

Text of statute as originally enacted

Revised text of statute as amended

- The Wireless Telegraphy Act 1949 (12, 13 & 14 Geo. 6. c. 54) (subsequently repealed)

Wireless Telegraphy (Validation of Charges) Act 1954 (Note: Section 2(1).)
- Act of Parliament
- Parliament of the United Kingdom
- Long title: An Act to validate certain charges in respect of licences under the Wireless Telegraphy Acts, 1904 to 1926, and for purposes connected with the matter aforesaid.
- Citation: 3 & 4 Eliz. 2. c. 2
- Territorial extent: United Kingdom; Channel Islands; Isle of Man; (Note: Section 2(2)–(4).)

Dates
- Royal assent: 22 December 1954
- Commencement: 22 December 1954 (Note: Section 1.)
- Repealed: 18 July 1973
Other legislation
Repealed by	Statute Law (Repeals) Act 1973

Status: Repealed

Text of statute as originally enacted

- The Wireless Telegraphy (Validation of Charges) Act 1954 (3 & 4 Eliz. 2. c. 2) (subsequently repealed)

Wireless Telegraphy (Blind Persons) Act 1955
- Act of Parliament
- Parliament of the United Kingdom
- Long title: An Act to amend subsection (2) of section two of the Wireless Telegraphy Act, 1949.
- Citation: 4 & 5 Eliz. 2. c. 7
- Territorial extent: United Kingdom; Channel Islands; Isle of Man; (Note: Section 2(2)–(3).)

Dates
- Royal assent: 27 July 1955
- Commencement: 27 July 1955
- Repealed: 1 April 1991 (Note: The Broadcasting Act 1990 (Commencement No. 1 and Transitional Provisions) Order 1990.)
Other legislation
Amends	Wireless Telegraphy Act 1949
Repealed by	Broadcasting Act 1990

Status: Repealed

Text of statute as originally enacted

- The Wireless Telegraphy (Blind Persons) Act 1955 (4 & 5 Eliz. 2. c. 7)
- The Marine, &c., Broadcasting (Offences) Act 1967 (c. 41) (banned offshore pirate radio stations, subsequently repealed)

Wireless Telegraphy Act 1967 (Note: Section 15(1).)
- Act of Parliament
- Parliament of the United Kingdom
- Long title: An Act to enable the Postmaster General to obtain information as to the sale and hire of television receiving sets; to enable him to prohibit the manufacture or importation of certain wireless telegraphy apparatus; to make provision for requiring applicants for vehicle excise licences to give information about such apparatus installed in vehicles; to make miscellaneous amendments in the Wireless Telegraphy Act 1949; and for connected purposes.
- Citation: 1967 c. 72
- Territorial extent: United Kingdom; Channel Islands; Isle of Man; (Note: Section 19(5)–(6).)

Dates
- Royal assent: 27 July 1967
- Commencement: 27 July 1967
- Repealed: 25 March 2013
Other legislation
Amends	Wireless Telegraphy Act 1949
Amended by	Broadcasting Act 1990; Vehicle Excise and Registration Act 1994; Wireless Telegraphy Act 2006
Repealed by	Enterprise and Regulatory Reform Act 2013

Status: Repealed

Text of statute as originally enacted

Revised text of statute as amended

- The Wireless Telegraphy Act 1967 (c. 72) (subsequently repealed)
- The Telecommunications Act 1984 (c. 12) (made amendments to the 1949 act)
- The Broadcasting Act 1990 (c. 42) (made extensive amendments to the 1949 and 1967 acts)
- The Broadcasting Act 1996 (c. 55)

Wireless Telegraphy Act 1998 (Note: Section 10(1).)
- Act of Parliament
- Parliament of the United Kingdom
- Long title: An Act to make provision about the grant of, and sums payable in respect of, licences under the Wireless Telegraphy Act 1949 other than television licences, and about the promotion of the efficient use and management of the electro-magnetic spectrum for wireless telegraphy; and for connected purposes.
- Citation: 1998 c. 6
- Territorial extent: United Kingdom; Channel Islands; Isle of Man; (Note: Section 9.)

Dates
- Royal assent: 18 March 1998
- Commencement: 18 June 1998 (Note: Section 10(2).)
- Repealed: 8 February 2007
Other legislation
Amends	Wireless Telegraphy Act 1949; Continental Shelf Act 1964; Post Office Act 1969; Telecommunications Act 1984; Department of Trade and Industry (Fees) Order 1988; Broadcasting Act 1990
Repealed by	Wireless Telegraphy Act 2006

Status: Repealed

Text of statute as originally enacted

Revised text of statute as amended

- The Wireless Telegraphy Act 1998 (c. 6) (introduced spectrum pricing)
- The Office of Communications Act 2002 (c. 11) (created Ofcom)
- The Communications Act 2003 (c. 21) (provided for new activities relating to spectrum pricing)
- The Wireless Telegraphy Act 2006 (c. 36)

== See also ==
- List of short titles
