= Radio City (pirate radio station) =

British pirate radio station at abandoned sea fort (1964–1967)

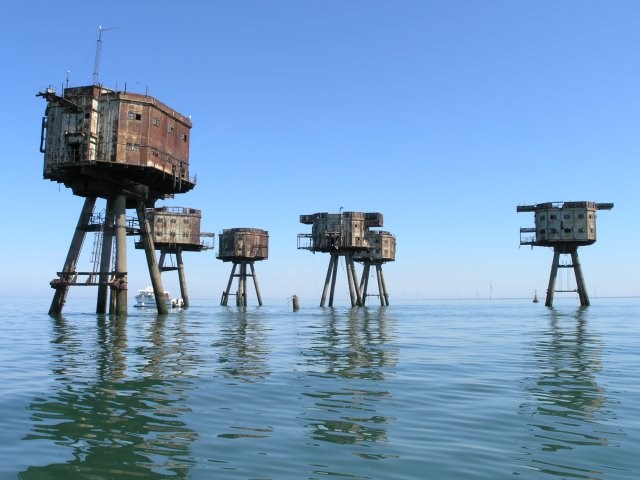
- Shivering Sands Army Fort. A recent photo, taken many years after the catwalks connecting the towers were removed as a safety hazard, and showing the towers in far rustier condition than they were in the 1960s.

Thames Estuary; United Kingdom
- Frequencies: 194 metres (197) (initially), 1542 kHz (later), 290 metres (1034 kHz), 299 metres (1003 kHz)

Programming
- Format: Pirate radio

Ownership
- Owner: Screaming Lord Sutch (founder), Reginald Calvert (later owner)
- Operator: Reginald Calvert

History
- First air date: 27 May 1964 (as Radio Sutch)
- Last air date: 8 February 1967

Technical information
- Power: 2 kW (claimed 10 kW)

Radio City was a British pirate radio station that operated from the Shivering Sands Army Fort, one of the abandoned Second World War Maunsell Sea Forts in the Thames Estuary. Originally launched as Radio Sutch by Screaming Lord Sutch on 27 May 1964, the station was part of the wave of offshore pirate stations that revolutionized British radio in the 1960s. Initially a low-powered, low-budget operation, it was later expanded by Reginald Calvert, who renamed it Radio City.

== Origins ==
In 1964, following the launch of Radio Caroline, Screaming Lord Sutch said he would start his own station. On 27 May Radio Sutch began broadcasting on 194 metres (announced as 197), 1542 kHz, from the south tower of Shivering Sands. It was a low-powered, low-budget operation.

The transmitter, from a Handley Page Halifax bomber, was powered with a cascade of car batteries, a scaffold pole with a skull-and-crossbones flag as an antenna. By September 1964 Sutch had become tired of it and sold it to his friend and unofficial (unpaid) manager Reginald Calvert for a reported £5,000. Calvert bought new equipment and expanded the station into other towers, renaming it Radio City. One of the original seven towers had been destroyed when a ship collided with it, leaving the northernmost tower isolated. The remaining five were connected by catwalks in an irregular star shape. Calvert's team repaired the catwalks and refurbished the facilities and living quarters. New studios were built, a more powerful transmitter installed, and the station experimented with new antenna configurations and frequencies (290 metres / 1034 kHz and eventually 299 metres/ 1003 kHz). Initially antenna wires were strung around the periphery of the towers. This was unsuccessful due to poor insulation. Later a vertical mast was erected on the central tower, supported by guy wires on three of the surrounding towers, and the station adopted the nickname "your tower of power". Although output never exceeded 2 kW, the efficiency of the antenna combined with its location over water (a reflector of radio waves) gave it the coverage of a more powerful land-based station, and Radio City claimed a power of 10 kW for the purpose of attracting advertisers.

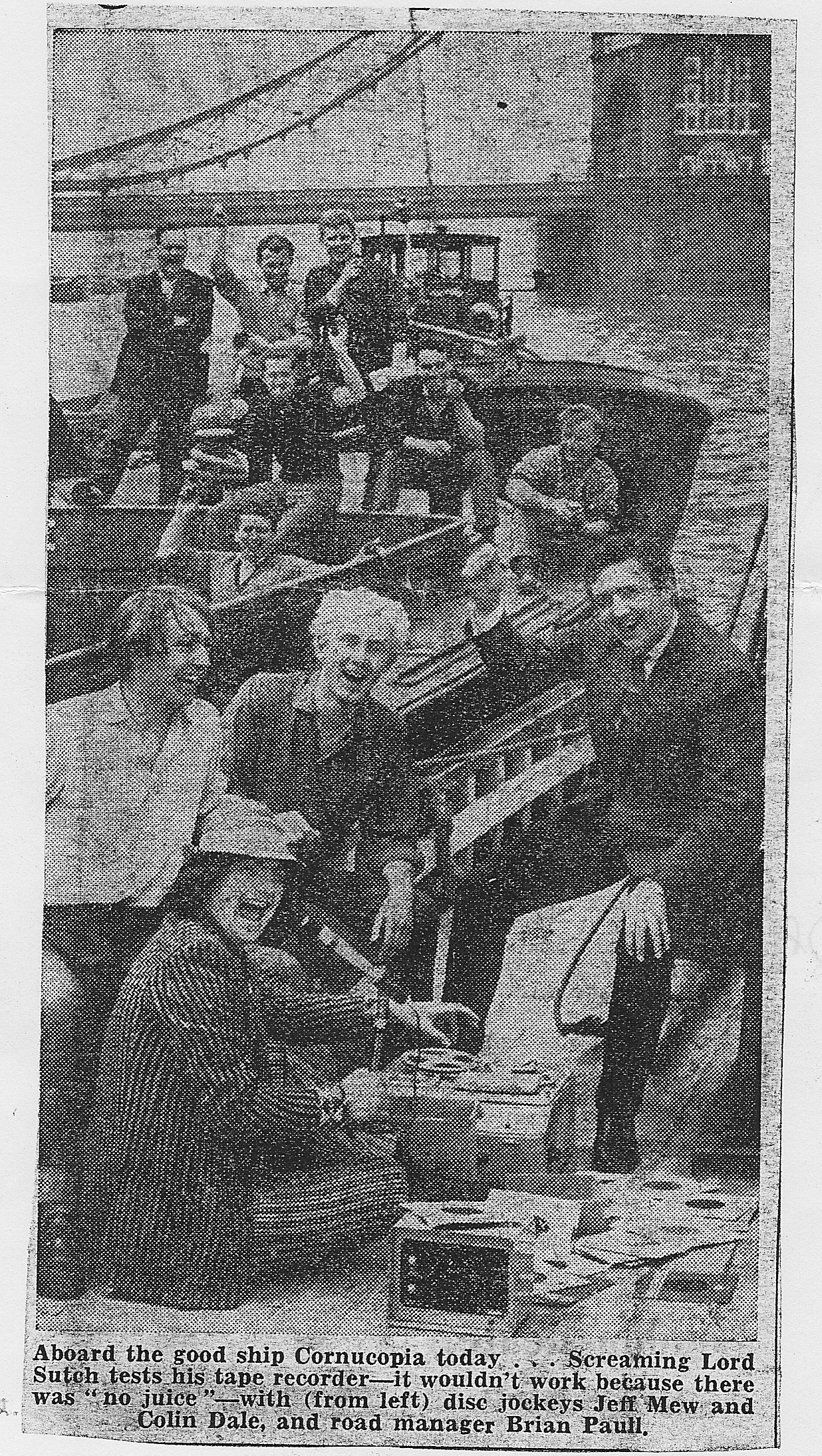
Sutch (foreground), allegedly broadcasting from a ship. 2nd row (left to right): Geoff Mew, Colin Dale, Brian Paull

One of the early DJ's on Radio City was Tom Edwards, who went onto become its senior DJ and programme director until the station's closure.

== Studio equipment ==
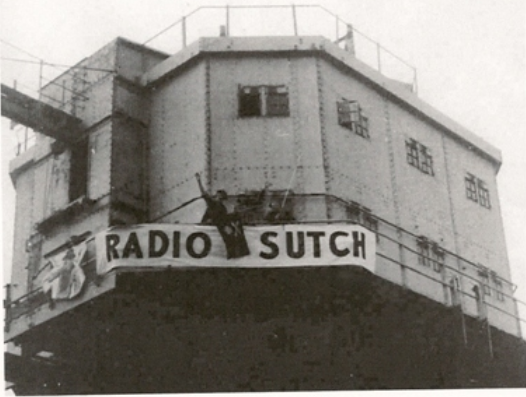
Radio Sutch on Shivering Sands

The studio equipment was standard albeit low-budget, comprising a pair (later three) of Garrard turntables, an AKG D12 microphone (the same model used by both Radio Caroline ships, Radio London and Radio 270), domestic tape decks and a basic custom mixer. A US navy transmitter General Electric TCJ-7 (nicknamed "Big Bertha") replaced the bomber transmitter. Most stations played jingles and commercials from cartridges but City used reel-to-reel. In addition to the usual music programmes, subsidised by Dutch and American evangelical shows, City had the only comedy show on pirate radio – The Auntie Mabel Hour, recordings of DJs acting comic sketches and parodying contemporary songs. Some material seems to have been stolen from The Goon Show and Round the Horne. At Christmas 1966 the show featured a parody of Alice in Wonderland and included the DJs singing new comic lyrics to instrumental versions of popular songs.

Another novelty was The Anti-City Show, which invited listeners to send letters and reel-to-reel tapes of complaint about the station. It became a forum for complaints about anything that annoyed. Occasionally, "You've Got Your Troubles" by The Fortunes was broadcast as a signal to land-based associates of a problem, such as a supply shortage.

The Port of London authority had placed wind and tide gauges on the isolated north tower and complained that City's signal interfered with their radio link to the mainland, potentially placing shipping at risk. Interference with official communications was a commonly cited reason for pirates to be banned but Radio City was to provide a more compelling reason for their closure.

== Merger talks and death of Reg Calvert ==
In September 1965, merger talks began between City and Radio Caroline South. A transmitter was delivered to the fort, intended to be used by Caroline when it left its ship. The transmitter proved to be unsuitable and indeed, unusable. The merger collapsed, but the transmitter was never collected. Calvert then talked to Radio London about a merger, in a venture called UKGM (United Kingdom Good Music).

In the early morning of 20 June 1966, a business associate of Calvert, retired Major Oliver Smedley (who claimed ownership of the transmitter), sent men to take possession of Shivering Sands with the intent of holding it for ransom. The next evening, Calvert visited Smedley's home and, in an alleged scuffle between him and a third party, was shot by Smedley. Smedley was charged with murder but cleared on grounds of self-defence. Following Reg's death a number of inconsistencies about the trial were revealed, plus the fact that Dorothy Calvert (Reg's widow) had been the subject of a D notice, preventing any of the many interviews she had given from being printed or broadcast.

The killing spurred the government to shut offshore stations, passing the Marine, &c., Broadcasting (Offences) Act 1967. However prior to this legislation, it was established that the fort, within British waters following a reinterpretation of the rules regarding territorial waters, was now covered by existing legislation. On 8 February 1967, at midnight the station closed with the playing of the national anthem.

== Film reference ==
The 1975 rock music film Slade in Flame, starring Slade, includes a scene in which the fictional rock band Flame visit Radio City for an interview, only to be airlifted to safety when shots are fired at the fort from a ship. It is later implied that the attack was staged by the band's unscrupulous manager to drum up publicity. The fictional attack was inspired by the actual 1966 boarding party; some news footage of the actual boarding is seen on a fictional television news report.

Exterior shots of the visit were filmed on and around Shivering Sands, with actor/musicians climbing the ladders used by Radio City DJs. For the airlift a helicopter landed on the roof of one towers. It was not big enough to carry all the actors, so they had to enter on one side of the aircraft and exit out of shot on the other. The film crew hung a Radio City banner on one towers, bigger and more professionally made than the crudely painted sign used by the station.

In one respect the film was not authentic: the fort has no antenna. The original Radio City mast had been dismantled in 1967. It was not possible to build a replica because of its size, and special effects techniques were not up to replicating it. Interior scenes were filmed on a stage. The interior dimensions of the tower are authentic, but the studio appears more professionally equipped. In particular, the fictional studio contains cartridge machines which Radio City never used. The Radio City DJ was played by Tommy Vance, who was on Radio Caroline in the 1960s.

In real life interviews on pirate stations would have been taped on land rather than exposing musicians to hazardous and expensive sea crossings.

An episode of Patrick McGoohan's Danger Man (known in the U.S. as Secret Agent), "The Not-So-Jolly Roger", was filmed on Red Sands Fort in early 1966 when "Radio 390" was broadcasting (shut down a year later). The episode was broadcast on 4 July that year.
