= Hugh Reed and the Velvet Underpants =

Scottish band

Hugh Reed and the Velvet Underpants are a cult Glasgow based band who have supported Debbie Harry, Simple Minds, the Fall and John Otway.

== Biography ==
The band was founded by Hugh O'Hagan, now commonly known as Hugh Reed, c. 1990 from an amalgam of members of Halcyon Days, the Rhythm Kittens and the Trouser Coughs, including at different times Stewart MacDonald and Lindsey Watt.

The first gig HR&TVU played was at Annie Miller's in Glasgow in 1989, supported by The Harlequin Cabbage Bugs followed by The State Bar where they were supported by The Rhythm Kittens. On both occasions, members of the support bands also took part in Hugh Reed and the Velvet Underpants' set. For the Annie Miller's gig, Hugh Reed used a bass borrowed from Lindsey Watt of Halcyon Days after breaking the strings of his own bass during the sound check. Video footage of the gig shows the Halcyon Days logo stuck to the front of the bass.

Hugh Reed and the Velvet Underpants also played in support of Pas the Gas at His Nibs with a short set consisting of four songs: "Sweet Jane", "Walk on the (Clyde)side", "Waiting for the Man", "White light/Heat", and "Get it On".

Hugh Reed and the Velvet Underpants had many different members throughout its existence in addition to core personnel Hugh O'Hagan and, slightly later, Tom Docherty. Tom's younger brother, Terence Docherty was their first guitarist and returned later as part of the Hugh Reed Explosion. Tom's youngest brother Tony Docherty was an occasional bassist. The association between the Docherty brothers and Reed still carries on.

The Velvet Underpants was particularly noted for its highly theatrical presentation and "witty" use of puns, titles "Take a Walk on the Clydeside" and "Smells Like Troon Harbour" being examples, and also, of course, the name of the band.

Hugh Reed and the Velvet Underpants lasted until Valentine's Day 1998, but was later reborn as the Hugh Reed Explosion.

Song material ranged from discussion of public perceptions of trainspotters and descriptions of hangovers, to accounts of what can happen when you drink in Glasgow's east end during an Old Firm game while wearing the wrong football scarf.

A typical Underpants gig would feature a stage dressed with numerous television sets all turned on, glitter balls and an overhead projector having coloured oils dropped on it. Reed would go through numerous costume changes and actions ranging from a policeman to a bride to illustrate each song.

Quite often he would leap manically about the audience, lost in an almost primal scream presentation. However, underpinning this was a tight backing band who could shift from punk rock ("Trainspotting") to scat-funk ("Salt, Sperm, Saliva, Sweat").

Since 2009, Reed has been living on and off in China, playing gigs in Beijing and played the first ever rock gigs in the southwestern city of Zunyi, a town with a population equivalent to Glasgow, Manchester or Liverpool. While in Beijing, Hugh built on his acting career -appearing on Chinese TV in a variety of roles, US serviceman, Super Man, a priest and a doctor. He was a waiter in the Jackie Chan movie ’12 Zodiacs’. He also appeared in the BBC Scotland documentary ‘Scots in China’ The band previously toured with the Fall, Half Man Half Biscuit, John Otway and supported Simple Minds at the Glasgow Royal Concert Hall.

The band reformed in 2021. Since reforming the band have played many festivals including ButeFest, Belladrum, Doune the Rabbit Hole, as well performing throughout the UK. As well as Hugh, the band members are Darren Paramisivan -keys – David Irvine – bass - Paul Magoo McGuire, guitar and on drums Chris Reilly.

== Media exposure ==
The band's first single, "Six tae Wan", was used by BBC Radio 1 as the theme to a series on Scottish rock music. O'Hagan and various band members also appeared on Scottish Television's late night debate programme Trial By Night in 1994.

On the recommendation of a friend, who saw Hugh Reed and the Velvet Underpants on local television, Deborah Harry invited the band to support her eleven date 1993 UK tour.

Hugh O'Hagan also appeared in the 1996 film Trainspotting as the man failing to chat up Renton's love interest Dianne, played by Kelly Macdonald.

== Discography ==
=== Albums ===
- Take a Walk on the Clydeside - 1996
- Ni Fa Feng Le Ma? - R U Mad? - 2010

=== Singles ===
- "Six to Wan" - 1991
- "Satellite Baby" - 1992

=== Videos/DVDs ===
- Carry On Up the Underpants - 2002
