= Oliver Smedley =

British businessman and politician (1911–1989)

William Oliver Smedley MC (19 February 1911 – 16 November 1989) was an English businessman involved in classical liberal politics and pirate radio. He was a founder of the Institute of Economic Affairs amongst other campaign groups and think tanks.

In 1966, he killed Reginald Calvert, in what was judged to be an act of self-defence.

== Early life and World War II ==
Smedley was born in Lingfield, Surrey on 19 February 1911, the son of William Herbert and Olivia Kate Smedley. His father was a director of the Gramophone Company. He attended Monkton Combe School near Bath, Somerset from 1921 to 1927, afterwards qualifying as an accountant. He played rugby for Richmond RFC during the 1930s.

Smedley enlisted in the Royal Artillery on 17 April 1939 and was commissioned in April 1940. He served in Iraq, North Africa, Sicily, and Italy before D-Day. He also became a paratrooper and participated in Operation Market Garden. Smedley won the Military Cross in December 1944 for his actions on 11 July 1944 at Audrieu in the battle for Normandy.

== Political career ==
Smedley described himself as an "uncompromising free-trader and libertarian". In opposition to Clement Attlee's Agriculture Act 1947, Smedley helped to found, and become secretary of, the Farmers' and Smallholders' Association in 1947. Its first president was the Conservative Party MP Waldron Smithers. In 1952, Smedley resigned from his job as a chartered accountant and campaigned for economic liberalism from his office in EC2. S. W. Alexander, editor of the City Press, used the newspaper to publicise Smedley's campaigns. Smedley later described himself and Alexander as "the only active free-traders left in England in the 1950s".

Smedley's main campaigning organisation was the Cheap Food League, which was against all types of protection and subsidy in agriculture, especially marketing boards. During a potato shortage in 1955, he said: "The NFU statement confirms my view that the union leaders care not whether the people starve, provided the potato growers are permanently protected from the cold wind of overseas competition. Such callous irresponsibility has been unknown in the land since the days of the Corn Laws."

In a protest against high taxation, Smedley founded the Council for the Reduction of Taxation in 1954. In 1955, whilst a member of the Society of Individualists, Smedley met Antony Fisher and together, following Friedrich Hayek's advice, they founded a new research institute to propagate neoliberal ideas. On Smedley's suggestion, it was named the Institute of Economic Affairs (IEA). Fisher and Ralph Harris (director of the IEA) were concerned with Smedley's links with the Liberal Party, and Harris moved the IEA's office from Smedley's EC2 office to Hobart Place in 1959.

Smedley took over the Free Trade League and the Cobden Club in 1958. As a Liberal Party politician, he stood against Rab Butler in Saffron Walden in the general elections of 1950 and 1951. In all, he contested eighteen parliamentary elections. According to Richard Cockett, Smedley and Alfred Suenson-Taylor "sought to keep the flames of Gladstonian Liberalism burning within the [Liberal] Party" and to oppose the influence of William Beveridge and John Maynard Keynes. Smedley was a critic of what he considered to be the Liberal Party's abandonment of free trade and self-improvement. (Note: In a speech in Westminster on 8 November 1952, Smedley said: It surely becomes clearer every day that no significant issue really divides the front benches of the House of Commons ... A tremendous responsibility therefore rests on Liberals inside the House and out, to tell the people the truth. Members of the other parties cannot bring themselves to do so ... We must warn the people that there can be no hope of survival in an intensely competitive world if our energies, enterprise and adaptability continue to be fettered by the outmoded trappings and controls of the centrally planned economy.)

Smedley left the Liberal Party in 1962 due to his opposition to their favourable attitude to British membership of the European Economic Community (EEC). He founded the Keep Britain Out campaign to oppose British membership of the EEC. The Times claimed that Smedley "believed that the EEC undermined the sovereignty of Britain and he was relentless in his efforts to save Britain from the high food prices of the protectionist common agricultural policies". In 1982, he founded the Free Trade Liberal Party with Alexander.

== Pirate radio ==
In 1964, with Alan Crawford, Smedley helped to form the British company Project Atlanta Limited that successfully launched Radio Atlanta, Britain's second full-time offshore commercial pirate radio station. The station used a ship that had once been the home of Radio Nord. Radio Atlanta eventually merged with the Caroline Organization led by Irishman Ronan O'Rahilly, and changed its name to Radio Caroline South. When Reginald Calvert, manager of The Fortunes pop group, founded a rival pirate station Radio City, Smedley tried to persuade Calvert to amalgamate with Radio Caroline in exchange for a new transmitter. The transmitter turned out to be antiquated and did not work properly (one of its sections had been accidentally dropped into the sea prior to being installed, although it is uncertain as to whether this was responsible for its malfunctioning) and Calvert refused to pay for it. Smedley in response hired a group of riggers to board Radio City and retrieve the transmitter.

The next day (21 June 1966), Smedley received threatening phone calls from Calvert and that night Calvert went to Smedley's house at Wendens Ambo, Essex. Smedley killed Calvert with a shotgun in what has been described as a "violent row". At his trial, Smedley said he feared Calvert was there to kill him. On 18 October 1966, the jury found Smedley not guilty of manslaughter in under a minute on the grounds of self-defence, and awarded him 250 guineas in costs.

== Works ==
- The Abominable No-Men (1952)
- What Is Happening to the British Economy? (1976)
- Out!: United Kingdom in the European Economic Community Spells Disaster (1986)
- Free Trade. The Non-nuclear Route to World Peace (1988)
- Land. Privately Appropriated Public Property (1987)
- The Future of Capitalism

== Bibliography ==
- Cockett, Richard (1995). Thinking the Unthinkable: Think-Tanks and the Economic Counter-Revolution, 1931–1983. Fontana. ISBN 978-0-00-637586-9.
