= 1964 in British radio =

This is a list of events from British radio in 1964.

== Events ==
=== January ===
- 5 January – Alan Freeman returns as host of Pick of the Pops.
- 26 January – York Hospital Radio goes on air with its first programme.

=== February ===
- No events

=== March ===
- 27 March – Children's Hour (renamed For the Young) is broadcast for the last time, on the BBC Home Service.
- 28 March – Radio Caroline, a "pirate" radio station set up by Ronan O'Rahilly broadcasting from MV Caroline anchored in international waters off Felixstowe, debuts as Europe's first all-day English-language pop music station.

=== April ===
- 3 April – The radio comedy series I'm Sorry, I'll Read That Again makes its debut, on the BBC Home Service.

=== May ===
- 12 May – "Pirate" radio station Radio Atlanta begins broadcasting from MV Mi Amigo anchored off Frinton; in July its operations are merged with Radio Caroline.
- 27 May – Screaming Lord Sutch begins broadcasting from "pirate" station Radio Sutch on Shivering Sands Army Fort offshore in the Thames Estuary; he soon sells the operation to his manager Reginald Calvert who renames it Radio City.

=== June ===
- 29 June – Launch of Manx Radio, the Isle of Man's national radio station.

=== July ===
- 6 July – MV Caroline takes up a new anchorage on Bahama Bank off the Isle of Man and begins broadcasting as Radio Caroline North.

=== August ===
- 13 August – The world premiere of Mahler's Tenth Symphony, the unfinished work completed by Deryck Cooke, is given at the BBC Proms, with the London Symphony Orchestra conducted by Berthold Goldschmidt.
- 30 August – The BBC Third Programme begins broadcasting during the day on Sundays.
- 31 August –
  - Farming Today moves from Network Three to the BBC Home Service where it takes over the early-morning slot previously occupied by Farm Bulletin.
  - The Light Programme begins its day an hour earlier, at 5.30am.

=== September ===
- 3 September – Priaulx Rainier's Cello Concerto is given its première at The Proms by Jacqueline du Pré and the BBC Symphony Orchestra under Norman Del Mar.
- 19 September – The programme for the Last Night of the Proms includes Alan Rawsthorne's Piano Concerto no 1, played by Malcolm Binns.
- 26 September – The Light Programme begins broadcasting during the early morning and closes at 2am instead of midnight.

=== October ===
- 6 October – The variety programme Workers' Playtime is aired for the last time, on the Light Programme.

=== November ===
- No events

=== December ===
- 1 December – Radio Caroline publicity officer David Block contacts the BBC to request a copy of the Queen's Christmas Message with the intention of broadcasting it on Christmas Day, but is turned down because Radio Caroline is not an authorised broadcaster.
- 12 December – The BBC Third Programme begins broadcasting on weekdays, providing a music service from 8am to 2pm.
- 23 December – The "pirate" station Wonderful Radio London goes on air broadcasting from MV Galaxy anchored off Frinton with a Fab 40 playlist of popular records.

== Station debuts ==
- 26 January – York Hospital Radio (1964 – present)
- 28 March – Radio Caroline (1964 – present)
- 29 June – Manx Radio (1964 – present)
- 23 December – Wonderful Radio London (1964–1967)

== Programme debuts ==
- 17 March – Many a Slip on the BBC Home Service (1964–1979)
- 3 April – I'm Sorry, I'll Read That Again on the BBC Home Service (1964–1973)
- 10 April – How's Your Father on the BBC Light Programme (series run 10 April–5 June)
- 26 July – Play it Cool on the BBC Light Programme (1964)

== Continuing radio programmes ==
=== 1940s ===
- Music While You Work (1940–1967)
- Sunday Half Hour (1940–2018)
- Desert Island Discs (1942 – present)
- Family Favourites (1945–1980)
- Down Your Way (1946–1992)
- Have A Go (1946–1967)
- Housewives' Choice (1946–1967)
- Letter from America (1946–2004)
- Woman's Hour (1946 – present)
- Twenty Questions (1947–1976)
- Any Questions? (1948 – present)
- The Dales (1948–1969)
- Billy Cotton Band Show (1949–1968)
- A Book at Bedtime (1949 – present)

=== 1950s ===
- The Archers (1950 – present)
- Listen with Mother (1950–1982)
- From Our Own Correspondent (1955 – present)
- Pick of the Pops (1955 – present)
- The Clitheroe Kid (1957–1972)
- My Word! (1957–1988)
- Test Match Special (1957 – present)
- The Today Programme (1957 – present)
- The Navy Lark (1959–1977)
- Sing Something Simple (1959–2001)
- Your Hundred Best Tunes (1959–2007)

=== 1960s ===
- Farming Today (1960 – present)
- Easy Beat (1960–1967)
- In Touch (1961 – present)
- The Men from the Ministry (1962–1977)

== Births ==
- 11 January – Tony Livesey, journalist and radio presenter
- 24 February – Andy Crane, television and radio presenter
- 1 April – Jez Nelson, jazz presenter and media producer
- 16 May
  - Rebecca Front, comic actress and scriptwriter
  - Milton Jones, comedian
- 23 June – Jane Garvey, radio presenter
- 27 June – Lynn Parsons, radio and television presenter
- 5 August – Rory Morrison, radio newsreader and continuity announcer (died 2013)
- 19 September – Patrick Marber, comedy performer and writer
- 27 September – Gilles Peterson, disc jockey
- 12 November – Mohit Bakaya, Controller of BBC Radio 4
- 21 November – Liza Tarbuck, actress and radio and television presenter
- 28 November – Sian Williams, journalist and current affairs presenter
- Unknown – Peter Kerry, writer of drama for radio and television

== Deaths ==
- 21 March – Nancy Spain, writer and broadcaster, died in aviation accident (born 1917)
- 28 September – Sir George Dyson, radio's "voice of music" (born 1883)
- 3 November – Julian MacLaren-Ross, writer and radio scriptwriter, heart attack (born 1912)
- 10 December – Charles Samuel Franklin, radio pioneer (born 1879)

== See also ==
- 1964 in British music
- 1964 in British television
- 1964 in the United Kingdom
- List of British films of 1964
