= 1964 in British television =

This is a list of British television related events from 1964.

== Events ==
=== January ===
- 1 January – The first episode of the pop music show Top of the Pops airs on BBC TV. The first programme is produced at the BBC's Dickenson Road Studios in Rusholme, Manchester, presented by Jimmy Savile, and the first two acts featured are Dusty Springfield with "I Only Want to Be with You" and The Rolling Stones with "I Wanna Be Your Man".
- 4 January – Test transmissions begin for BBC2.

=== February ===
- 9 February – Launch of BBC Wales TV.
- 18 February – BBC1's sitcom Steptoe and Son becomes one of the most popular programmes on television, watched by an audience of 21.54 million viewers.

=== March ===
- 6 March – Vision On, the first ever programme for deaf children, is launched on BBC TV.
- 25 March – The Beatles make their first appearance on Top of the Pops, with a pre-recorded performance of the single "Can't Buy Me Love".
- 30 March – Tyne Tees Television's regional news magazine North East Roundabout is relaunched as North East Newsview.

=== April ===
- 1 April – The Bressay transmitting station in Shetland comes into service, making the islands the last area of the United Kingdom to get a television transmitter.
- 6 April – Associated-Rediffusion changes its name to Rediffusion, London.
- 20 April – The scheduled opening night of BBC2, the UK's third television channel, is disrupted by power cuts in London, and all that can be screened is newsreader Gerald Priestland delivering apologies from Alexandra Palace. The existing BBC TV channel is renamed BBC1.
- 21 April – Play School is first broadcast on BBC2. The channel's launch schedule, abandoned on the previous day, is shown in full this evening.
- 26 April – News Review, a summary of the week's news with subtitles for the deaf and hard-of-hearing, is broadcast for the first time as part of the launch of BBC2.
- 30 April – Television sets manufactured from this date are required to receive UHF channels.

=== May ===
- 5 May – The documentary film Seven Up! is broadcast on ITV, showing the lives of fourteen school children. Subsequent films in the series see them interviewed every seven years.
- 12 May – ITV London region starts showing the US science fiction horror anthology series The Twilight Zone.
- 13 May – The character Martha Longhurst dies of a heart attack in the snug of The Rovers Return on Coronation Street.
- 30 May – The 26-part documentary series The Great War covering events in World War I begins airing on the BBC.

=== July ===
- July – Associated Television's series Emergency – Ward 10 shows the first kiss on television between black and white actors, Joan Hooley playing surgeon Louise Mahler and John White playing Dr. Giles Farmer.

=== August ===
- 4 August – The first portable televisions go on sale.
- 22 August – Football's first Match of the Day airs on BBC2. The following programmes move to BBC1.

=== September ===
- 13 September – ITV broadcasts Clive Exton's black absurdist medico-legal satire The Trial of Dr Fancy in ATV's Armchair Theatre series, some two years after it was filmed, ATV having originally felt it would give offence to viewers.
- 18 September – Doctor Who goes to air on NZBC in New Zealand making it the first country outside of the United Kingdom to broadcast the long-running science fiction series. First airing in the region of Christchurch from 18 September to 11 December 1964, then in Auckland from 30 October 1964 to 29 January 1965, Wellington from 6 November 1964 to 5 February 1965 and Dunedin from 5 March to 28 May 1965.
- 28 September – In the Midlands, BBC1 airs the first edition of its local news programme, Midlands Today.

=== October ===
- 4 October – The first episode of Stingray airs on Anglia, ATV London, Border, Grampian and Southern. It was the first British television series to have all of its episodes filmed in colour, although it would not be broadcast in colour until December 1969.
- 9 October – Southern launches a weekly news magazine for the south east called Friday at Ten.
- 10 October – The 1964 Summer Olympics opening ceremony at Tokyo, Japan, with the first live Olympic broadcast via geostationary communication satellite.
- 10 October – Danger Man (US: Secret Agent) returns to ITV in longer episodes after being cancelled in 1961. The first episode airs on ATV London three days in advance of ATV Midlands.
- 15 October – 1964 United Kingdom general election. The BBC moves this evening's episode of Steptoe and Son to a later time slot to allow voters to get to the polls in the early evening.
- 28 October – The Wednesday Play premieres on BBC1.

=== November ===
- 2 November – ATV's soap opera Crossroads premieres on ITV.

=== December ===
- 6 December – BBC2 goes on air in the Midlands and East Anglia. The Sutton Coldfield transmitting station initially cannot relay BBC2 beyond an area reception to the Midlands region, resulting in a staggered signal.
- 15 December – Peter Watkins' docudrama Culloden is shown on BBC1.

=== Undated ===
- Some 90% of British households now own a television, compared to around 25% in 1953 and 65% in 1959.

== New channels ==
Date	Channel
20 April	BBC2

== Debuts ==
=== BBC Television Service/BBC TV/BBC1 ===
- 1 January – Top of the Pops (1964–2006, 2006–present at Christmas)
- 19 January – Martin Chuzzlewit (1964)
- 6 March – Vision On (1964–1976)
- 30 March – Detective (1964–1969)
- 6 April – Cluff (1964–1965)
- 11 April – Baxter On... (1964)
- 19 April
  - Hamlet at Elsinore (1964)
  - Rupert of Hentzau (1964)
- 3 May – The Kathy Kirby Show (1964–1966)
- 18 May – Sherlock Holmes (1964–1968)
- 31 May – Silas Marner (1964)
- 9 June – The Graham Stark Show (1964)
- 21 June – The Roy Castle Show (1964–1970)
- 1 July – Catch Hand (1964)
- 2 July – Call the Gun Expert (1964)
- 4 July – The Four Seasons of Rosie Carr (1964)
- 5 July – The Indian Tales of Rudyard Kipling (1964)
- 6 July – Thorndyke (1964)
- 9 July – The Valiant Varneys (1964–1965)
- 12 July – Smuggler's Bay (1964)
- 26 July – Kipling (1964)
- 31 July – A World of His Own (1964–1965)
- 8 August – Diary of a Young Man (1964)
- 13 August – Lance at Large (1964)
- 18 August – Swizzlewick (1964)
- 23 August – The Children of the New Forest (1964)
- 18 September – The Big Noise (1964)
- 28 September – Midlands Today (1964–present)
- 30 September – The Wednesday Play (1964–1970)
- 4 October – The Count of Monte Cristo (1964)
- 22 October – Bewitched (1964–1972)
- 28 October – Curtain of Fear (1964)
- 13 November – Not So Much a Programme, More a Way of Life (1964–1965)
- 19 November – The Singing Ringing Tree (1957)
- 20 November – R3 (1964–1965)
- 4 December – The Likely Lads (1964–1966)
- 11 December – Frankie Howerd (1964–1966)
- 15 December – Culloden (1964)
- 19 December – Scott On... (1964–1965; 1968–1972; 1974)

=== BBC2 ===
- 21 April
  - Play School (1964–1988)
  - Jazz 625 (1964–1966)
- 24 April – Story Parade (1964–1965)
- 25 April – Madame Bovary (1964)
- 26 April – Melissa (1964)
- 27 April – Impromptu (1964)
- 2 May
  - Horizon (1964—present)
  - Theatre 625 (1964–1968)
- 23 May – Ann Veronica (1964)
- 30 May – The Great War (1964)
- 20 June – Mary Barton (1964)
- 21 June – The Midnight Men (1964)
- 6 July – The Beat Room (1964–1965)
- 18 July – Witch Wood (1964)
- 2 August – The Sleeper (1964)
- 22 August – Match of the Day (1964–present)
- 12 September
  - The Ordeal of Richard Feverel (1964)
  - The Massingham Affair (1964)
  - Late Night Line-Up (1964–1972)
- 8 October – The Old Wives' Tale (1964)
- 8 October – Thursday Theatre (1964–1965)
- 14 November – Esther Waters (1964)
- 19 November – Simon and Laura (1964)
- 12 December – Six (1964–1965) (Anthology series)
- 13 December – The Brothers Karamazov (1964–1965)
- 25 December – Muses with Milligan (1964–1965)
- Unknown – The Virginian (1962–1971)

=== ITV ===
- 2 January – Foreign Affairs (1964)
- 3 January – It's Dark Outside (1964–1965)
- 6 January – Second City Reports (1964)
- 7 January – The Fugitive (1963–1967)
- 17 January – A Touch of the Norman Vaughans (1964)
- 19 January – Studio '64 (1964)
- 12 February – How to Be an Alien (1964)
- 28 February – The Villains (1964–1965)
- 3 March – The Barnstormers (1964)
- 28 March – The Protectors (1964)
- 16 April – The Outer Limits (1963–1965)
- 5 May – Seven Up! (1964–present)
- 14 May – Cinema (1964–1975)
- 5 July
  - Blackpool Night Out (1964–1965)
  - Miss Adventure (1964)
- 9 July – The Hidden Truth (1964)
- 16 July – HMS Paradise (1964–1965)
- 10 August – A Choice of Coward (1964)
- 29 August – Fire Crackers (1964–1965)
- 4 September – It's a Woman's World (1964)
- 29 September – Mike (1964)
- 2 October – Paris 1900 (1964)
- 3 October – The Sullavan Brothers (1964–1965)
- 4 October
  - The Eamonn Andrews Show (1964–1969)
  - Stingray (1964–1965)
- 10 October – Voyage to the Bottom of the Sea (1964–1968)
- 17 October – Redcap (1964–1966)
- 21 October – Dave's Kingdom (1964)
- 2 November – Crossroads (1964–1988, 2001–2003)
- 13 November – Victoria Regina (1964)
- 14 November – Gideon's Way (1964–1966)
- 29 November – Just Jimmy (1964–1968)
- 16 December – It's Tarbuck (1964–1965, 1970–1973)
- 21 December – That's for Me (1964–1965)

== Television shows ==
=== Returning this year after a break of one year or longer ===
- 10 October – Danger Man (1960–1961, 1964–1968)

== Continuing television shows ==
=== 1920s ===
- BBC Wimbledon (1927–1939, 1946–2019, 2021–2024)

=== 1930s ===
- Trooping the Colour (1937–1939, 1946–2019, 2023–present)
- The Boat Race (1938–1939, 1946–2019, 2021–present)
- BBC Cricket (1939, 1946–1999, 2020–2024)

=== 1940s ===
- The Ed Sullivan Show (1948–1971)
- Come Dancing (1949–1998)

=== 1950s ===
- Andy Pandy (1950–1970, 2002–2005)
- Watch with Mother (1952–1975)
- Rag, Tag and Bobtail (1953–1965)
- The Good Old Days (1953–1983)
- Panorama (1953–present)
- Picture Book (1955–1965)
- Sunday Night at the London Palladium (1955–1967, 1973–1974)
- Take Your Pick! (1955–1968, 1992–1998)
- Double Your Money (1955–1968)
- Dixon of Dock Green (1955–1976)
- Crackerjack (1955–1970, 1972–1984, 2020–2021)
- ITV Wimbledon (1956–1968)
- Opportunity Knocks (1956–1978, 1987–1990)
- This Week (1956–1978, 1986–1992)
- Armchair Theatre (1956–1974)
- What the Papers Say (1956–2008)
- The Sky at Night (1957–present)
- Picture Book (1958–1965)
- Blue Peter (1958–present)
- Grandstand (1958–2007)
- Noggin the Nog (1959–1965, 1970, 1979–1982)

=== 1960s ===
- Sykes and A... (1960–1965)
- The Flintstones (1960–1966)
- Coronation Street (1960–present)
- The Avengers (1961–1969)
- Points of View (1961–present)
- Songs of Praise (1961–present)
- Compact (1962–1965)
- Steptoe and Son (1962–1965, 1970–1974)
- Hugh and I (1962–1967)
- The Saint (1962–1969)
- Z-Cars (1962–1978)
- Animal Magic (1962–1983)
- The Human Jungle (1963–1965)
- Ready Steady Go! (1963–1966)
- Doctor Who (1963–1989, 1996, 2005–present)
- World in Action (1963–1998)

== Ending this year ==
- Boyd Q.C. (1956–1964)
- Gwlad y Gan (1958–1964)
- Ghost Squad (1961–1964)
- Happily Ever After (1961–1964)
- The Human Jungle (1963–1964)

== Births ==
- 12 January – Clare Holman, actress (Inspector Morse)
- 13 January – Bill Bailey, comedian
- 1 February – Linus Roache, actor
- 3 February – Gary Webster, actor
- 16 February – Christopher Eccleston, actor
- 24 February – Andy Crane, television and radio presenter
- 25 February – Lee Evans, comedian and actor
- 11 March – Shane Richie, actor
- 25 April – Fiona Bruce, journalist, newsreader and television presenter
- 13 June – Kathy Burke, actress and comedian
- 18 June – Linda Davidson, actress, writer and media executive
- 27 June – Lynn Parsons, radio and television presenter
- 3 July – Fionnuala Ellwood, actress
- 12 July – Gaby Roslin, television presenter and actress
- 21 July – Ross Kemp, actor and journalist
- 22 July – Bonnie Langford, actress and entertainer
- 23 July – Matilda Ziegler, actress
- 25 August – Clive Myrie, news presenter
- 27 August – Cheryl Fergison, actress
- 1 October – Harry Hill, born Matthew Hall, comedian, television presenter and author, previously a medical doctor
- 8 October – Ian Hart, actor
- October – Donna Traynor, Northern Ireland news presenter
- 18 November – Nadia Sawalha, actress and television presenter
- 19 November – Susie Dent, lexicographer on Countdown
- 21 November – Liza Tarbuck, actress and television presenter
- 26 November – Lia Williams, actress and director
- 12 December – Reeta Chakrabarti, television news presenter

== Deaths ==
- 24 February – Frank Conroy, actor, aged 73
- 25 September – Robert Wilson, singer and TV presenter, aged 57
- 10 December – Charles Samuel Franklin, radio and television engineer, designer of broadcasting antennae and aerials, aged 85

== See also ==
- 1964 in British music
- 1964 in British radio
- 1964 in the United Kingdom
- List of British films of 1964
