= Her Brilliant Career =

2013 book by Rachel Cooke

Her Brilliant Career: Ten Extraordinary Women of the Fifties is a non-fiction book by Rachel Cooke, published by Virago Books in 2013.

Women catalogued in the book include Betty Box, Muriel Box, Sheila van Damm, Margery Fish, Patience Gray, Jacquetta Hawkes, Rose Heilbron, Joan Werner Laurie, Nancy Spain, and Alison Smithson.

The book catalogues British women in the 1950s who pursued careers.

Joanna Scutts, in the Washington Post, an American newspaper, wrote that the work is "very much a book of British cultural history", and stated non-British audiences may not understand references that Britons may know.

== Reception ==
Katharine Whitehorn wrote in The Observer that "this excellent book should go far towards setting the record straight" about women's increasing experience of having professional careers rather than being confined to a life as a housewife as accounts of the 1950s commonly assume.

Amanda Craig wrote in The Independent that Cooke's "writing does not delve deep but is eloquent, concise, fair-minded, witty and elegant."

Anne Sebba wrote in Literary Review that the topic of the book is "a brilliant idea", that the work was written in a "refreshingly honest" manner, and that the "fresh and original" literary style "sparkles".

Scutts praised how the book's author had "respect for her subjects’ shared attitude of “derring-do,”[...]".

== See also ==
- The Virago Book of Friendship, a book edited by Cooke
