= 1964 in British music =

This is a summary of 1964 in music in the United Kingdom, including the official charts from that year.

== Events ==
- 1 January – The first episode of the long-running weekly pop music show Top of the Pops airs on BBC TV. The first programme is produced at the BBC's Dickenson Road Studios in Rusholme, Manchester, presented by Jimmy Savile, and the first two acts featured are Dusty Springfield with "I Only Want to Be with You" and The Rolling Stones with "I Wanna Be Your Man".
- 3 January – Footage of The Beatles performing a concert in Bournemouth is shown on The Jack Paar Show in the US.
- 7 February – The Beatles arrive in the United States and are greeted by thousands of screaming fans at New York's Kennedy Airport.
- 9 February – The Beatles perform on The Ed Sullivan Show; their appearance breaks US television ratings records.
- 12 February – Anna Moffo collapses onstage at Covent Garden (London) in the first act of Rigoletto, and her part is taken over, after a delay of 45 minutes, by Welsh soprano Elizabeth Vaughan.
- 23 February – João Carlos Martins suddenly breaks off a performance in the middle of the second movement of Beethoven's Piano Concerto No. 3 with the City of Birmingham Symphony Orchestra at Birmingham Town Hall due to an attack of appendicitis.
- 28 February – Peter and Gordon release their first single, "A World Without Love", a Paul McCartney song that McCartney had decided was "not good enough" for The Beatles. The song ultimately tops the charts in both the UK and the USA.
- 12 March – In Moscow, Benjamin Britten conducts the premiere of his Symphony for Cello and Orchestra with soloist Mstislav Rostropovich and the Moscow Philharmonic Orchestra.
- 14 March – Billboard magazine reports that sales of Beatles records make up 60% of the entire singles market.
- 20 March – Britten's opera Peter Grimes receives its first performance in the USSR, conducted in Leningrad by Djemal Dalgat.
- 21 March – "I Love the Little Things", sung by Matt Monro, the UK's entry in the Eurovision Song Contest (staged in Copenhagen), finishes in second place, beaten by Italy's "Non ho l'età", sung by 16-year-old Gigliola Cinquetti.
- 24 March – John Lennon's first book, In His Own Write is published.
- 27 March – The Beatles occupy the top six spots on the Australian pop chart.
- 28 March
  - "Pirate" radio station Radio Caroline begins regular broadcasting from a ship anchored just outside UK territorial waters off Felixstowe.
  - Wax likenesses of The Beatles are put on display in London's Madame Tussauds Wax Museum. The Beatles are the first pop stars to be displayed at the museum.
- April – Drummer Keith Moon joins The Who.
- 4 April – The Beatles occupy all five top positions on Billboard's Hot 100 with their singles "Can't Buy Me Love", "Twist and Shout", "She Loves You", "I Want to Hold Your Hand", and "Please Please Me".
- 11 April – The Beatles hold 14 positions on the Billboard Hot 100 chart. Previously, the highest number of concurrent singles by one artist on the Hot 100 was nine by Elvis Presley, December 19, 1956.
- 16 April – The Rolling Stones release their eponymous début album.
- 2 May – In the United States, The Beatles' Second Album climbs to the #1 spot on the LP charts in only its second week of release.
- 12 May – Pirate radio station Radio Atlanta begins broadcasting from MV Mi Amigo anchored off Frinton-on-Sea; in July its operations are merged with Radio Caroline.
- 27 May – Pirate radio station Radio Sutch begins broadcasting from Shivering Sands Army Fort in the Thames Estuary.
- June – During a performance at the Railway, Pete Townshend of The Who accidentally breaks the head of his guitar on the low ceiling above the stage. This incident marks the start of auto-destructive art by destroying guitars and drums on stage.
- 5 June – The Rolling Stones start their first US tour.
- 3 July – With their new manager Peter Meaden, The Who release their first single "Zoot Suit"/"I'm the Face" under the band name 'The High Numbers' in an attempt to appeal to a mod audience. It fails to reach the top 50 and the band reverts to calling themselves The Who.
- 6 July – The Beatles' first film, A Hard Day's Night, is released. The album is released on 10 July. All tracks are by Lennon–McCartney.
- 10 July – More than 300 people are injured in Liverpool when a crowd of some 150,000 welcomes The Beatles back to their home city.
- 11 July – The Animals' electric rock recording of US folk song "The House of the Rising Sun" reaches No. 1 in the UK charts.
- 4 August – Release of London group The Kinks' successful single You Really Got Me, written by Ray Davies.
- 8 August – A Rolling Stones gig at Scheveningen in the Netherlands gets out of control. Riot police end the gig after about fifteen minutes, upon which spectators start to fight the riot police.
- 13 August – The world premiere of Mahler's Symphony No. 10, the unfinished work completed by Deryck Cooke, is given at the BBC Proms with the London Symphony Orchestra conducted by Berthold Goldschmidt.
- 3 September – Priaulx Rainier's Cello Concerto is given its première at The Proms by Jacqueline du Pré and the BBC Symphony Orchestra under Norman Del Mar.
- 19 September – The programme for the Last Night of the Proms includes Alan Rawsthorne's Piano Concerto no 1, played by Malcolm Binns.
- 24 October – The Rolling Stones start their second US tour.
- 25 October – The Rolling Stones perform on The Ed Sullivan Show for the first time.
- 7 December – George Harrison's new publishing company, Mornyork Ltd, changes its name to Harrisongs.
- 23 December – "Pirate" radio station Wonderful Radio London begins broadcasting from MV Galaxy anchored off Frinton-on-Sea, with a Fab 40 playlist of popular records.
- 24 December – The Beatles gain the Christmas number one for the second year running with "I Feel Fine", which has topped the singles charts for the third week running. The Beatles have now had six number one singles in the UK alone.
- December – Sir John Barbirolli records Elgar's The Dream of Gerontius with Janet Baker as the Angel. The first stereophonic recording of the work, it remains in the catalogues continuously following its first release.

== Charts ==
- See List of UK Singles Chart number ones of 1964

== Classical music ==
=== New works ===
- William Alwyn – Concerto Grosso No. 3
- Malcolm Arnold
  - Sinfonietta No. 3, for orchestra, Op. 81
  - Water Music, for winds and percussion, Op. 82
  - A Sunshine Overture, for orchestra, Op. 83
  - Five Pieces for violin and piano, Op. 84
- Harrison Birtwistle
  - Entr’actes and Sappho Fragments, for soprano, flute, oboe, violin, viola, harp, and percussion
  - Three Movements with Fanfares, for chamber orchestra
- Peter Maxwell Davies
  - Five Little Pieces for piano
  - Second Fantasia on John Taverner's In Nomine, for orchestra
  - Shakespeare Music, for 11 instruments

=== Opera ===
- Benjamin Britten –
  - Billy Budd (revised version)
  - Curlew River

== Film and Incidental music ==
- John Barry –
  - Goldfinger directed by Guy Hamilton, starring Sean Connery.
  - Zulu, starring Stanley Baker.
- Ron Goodwin – 633 Squadron.
- David Lee – The Masque of the Red Death directed by Roger Corman, starring Vincent Price.

== Musical theatre ==
- She Loves Me – London production opens at the Lyric Theatre on 29 April and runs for 189 performances
- Maggie May London production opens at the Adelphi Theatre on 22 September and runs for 501 performances
- Robert and Elizabeth – London production opens at the Lyric Theatre on 20 October and runs for 948 performances
- Little Me, the musical – London production opens at the Cambridge Theatre on 18 November and runs for 334 performances
- Salad Days (Julian Slade) – London revival

== Musical films ==
- A Hard Day's Night
- Wonderful Life

== Births ==
- 9 January – Phil Hartnoll, musician and songwriter (Orbital)
- 17 January – Andy Rourke, bassist (The Smiths)
- 4 February – Ian Clarke, flautist and composer
- 14 February – Rob "The Bass Thing" Jones, musician (d. 1993)
- 18 February
  - Paul Hanley, drummer and songwriter (The Fall and Tom Hingley and the Lovers)
  - Tommy Scott, singer (Space)
- 20 February – Iain Ballamy, composer and saxophonist
- 11 March – Shane Richie, actor, comedian and singer
- 26 March – Gary Coupland, Scottish musician (The Singing Kettle)
- 25 April – Andy Bell, singer and songwriter (Erasure)
- 8 May – Dave Rowntree, drummer (Blur)
- 14 May – Shelley Preston, singer (Bucks Fizz)
- 25 June – Gavin Greenaway, composer and conductor, son of Roger Greenaway
- 28 June – Steve Williamson, saxophonist and composer (Jazz Warriors)
- 29 June – Stedman Pearson, R&B singer (Five Star)
- 26 September – Nicki French, singer
- 7 October – Sam Brown, singer, daughter of singers Joe Brown and Vicki Brown
- 6 December – Matthew Taylor, composer and conductor
- 18 December – Robson Green, actor and singer
- 25 December – Ian Bostridge, operatic and concert tenor
- date unknown
  - Ivan Moody, composer
  - Nitin Sawhney, musician, producer and composer
  - Roderick Watkins, composer

== Deaths ==
- 7 January – Cyril Davies, harmonica player (born 1932; endocarditis)
- 19 May – Lawrence Wright, composer and music publisher (born 1888)
- 2 June – Phyllis Dixey, singer, dancer and impresario (born 1914)
- 28 September – George Dyson, English composer (born 1883)
- 13 October
  - Richard Hayward, actor, writer and musician (born 1892)
  - Francis Toye, music critic (born 1883)
- 9 December – Edith Sitwell, poet and collaborator of William Walton (born 1887)

== See also ==
- 1964 in British radio
- 1964 in British television
- 1964 in the United Kingdom
- List of British films of 1964
