= 1964 in the United Kingdom =

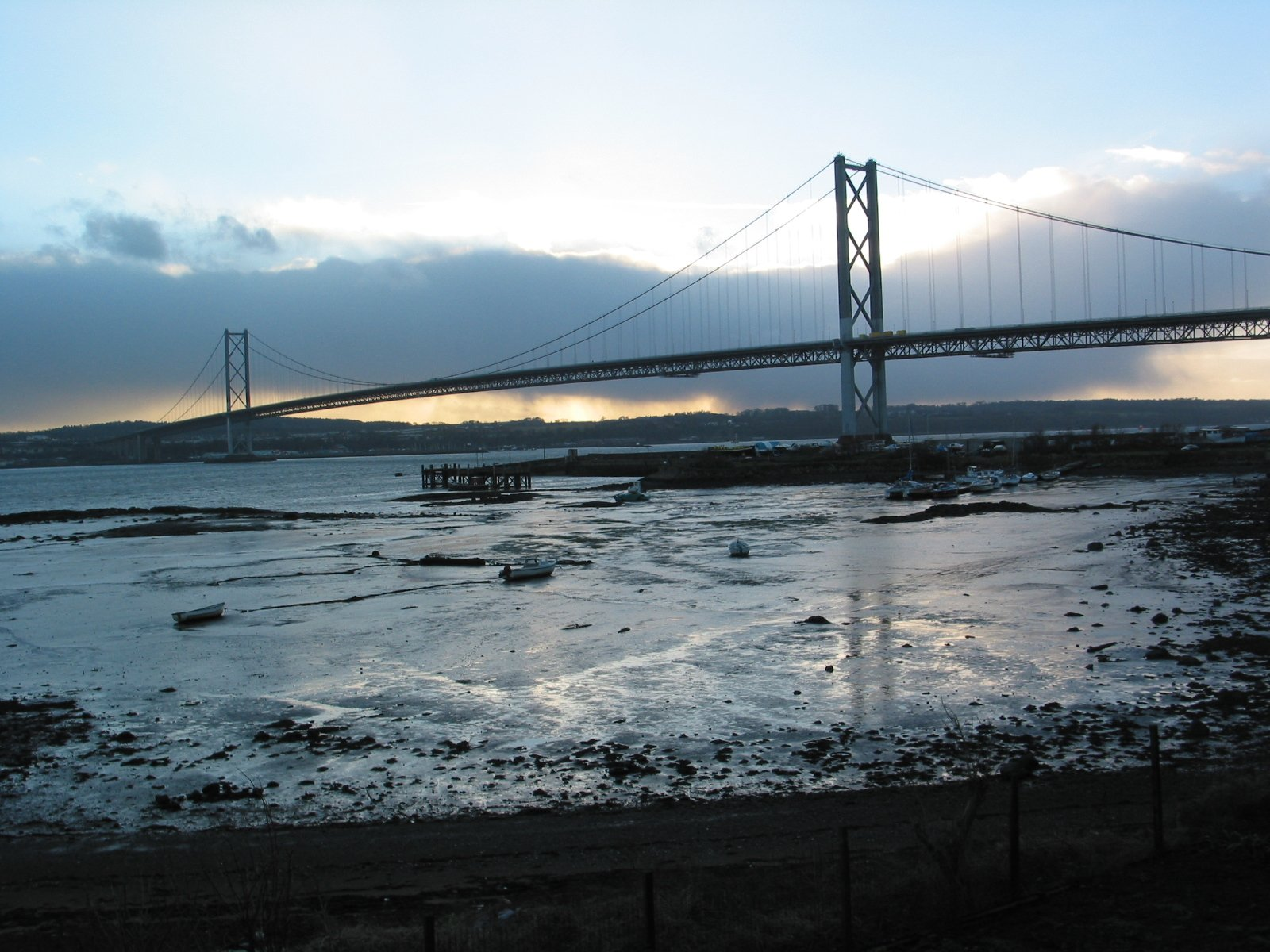
The Forth Road Bridge in Scotland opens on 4 September 1964.

Events from the year 1964 in the United Kingdom.

== Incumbents ==
- Monarch – Elizabeth II
- Prime Minister - Alec Douglas-Home (Conservative) (until 16 October), Harold Wilson (Labour) (starting 16 October)

== Events ==
=== January ===
- 1 January – Top of the Pops first airs on BBC TV.
- 11 January – The teen girls magazine Jackie is first published.
- 20 January – Eleven men go on trial at Buckinghamshire Assizes in Aylesbury charged in connection with the Great Train Robbery five months ago.
- 21 January – Government figures show that the average weekly wage is £16.
- 22 January – The film Zulu is released.
- 28 January – Families from Springtown Camp make a silent march through Derry, Northern Ireland, to demand rehousing.
- 29 January–9 February – Great Britain and Northern Ireland compete at the Winter Olympics in Innsbruck, Austria and win one gold medal.

=== February ===
- 6 February – The British and French governments agree a deal for the construction of a Channel Tunnel. The twin-tunneled rail link is expected to take five years to build.
- 11 February – Southampton is granted city status, the first such designation of the current reign.
- 19 February – The actor Peter Sellers marries actress Britt Ekland.
- 21 February – £10 banknotes are issued for the first time since the Second World War.

=== March ===
- 9 March – The London Fisheries Convention is signed.
- 10 March – The Queen gives birth to her fourth child and third son whose name is registered on 20 April as Edward.
- 19 March
  - Power dispute talks break down and it is feared that supply disruptions will follow industrial action.
  - The government announces plans to build three new towns in South East England to act as overspill for overpopulated London. One of these is centred on the village of Milton Keynes in north Buckinghamshire.
- 26 March – Verdicts are passed on ten men for their role in the Great Train Robbery after one of the longest criminal trials and longest jury retrials in English legal history.
- 28 March – "Pirate" radio station Radio Caroline begins regular broadcasting from a ship anchored just outside UK territorial waters off Felixstowe.
- 29 March – The first purpose-built gurdwara in Britain opens, the Guru Gobind Singh Ji Gurdwara in Bradford.
- 30 March – Violent disturbances between Mods and Rockers occur at Clacton beach.
- 31 March – Minister of Labour Joseph Godber appoints Lord Justice Pearson to chair a court of inquiry into the power dispute.

=== April ===
- 1 April
  - The UK government create the Ministry of Defence (MoD), amalgamating the duties of the Admiralty (which controlled the Royal Navy), War Office (British Army), and Air Ministry (Royal Air Force) which all cease to exist.
  - The title of Lord High Admiral is revested in the Monarch.
  - The Ministry of Education and Ministry of Science merge to form the Department of Education and Science.
- 9 April – Labour wins the first elections to the Greater London Council.
- 10 April – Runcorn, a small town in north Cheshire, is designated as a new town by Alec Douglas-Home's government. Extensive house building and industrial and commercial developments are predicted to inflate the town's population to around 70,000 by 1981.
- 11 April – The National Trust reopens the southern section of the Stratford-upon-Avon Canal, the first major restoration of a British canal for leisure use.
- 16 April – Sentence is passed on eleven men for their role in the Great Train Robbery, seven receiving 30 years each.
- 18 April – Liverpool win the Football League First Division for the sixth time in their history.
- 20 April – The opening night of BBC2, the UK's third television channel, is disrupted by power cuts in London and all that can be screened is announcer Gerald Priestland delivering apologies from Alexandra Palace. On the same day, the BBC Television Service is renamed BBC1.
- 21 April – BBC2 begins its scheduled broadcasting, its first programme is the children's series Play School which would run until 1988.
- 29 April – All schools in Aberdeen are closed following 136 cases of typhoid being reported.

=== May ===
- 1 May – Princess Margaret gives birth to a baby girl.
- 2 May
  - West Ham United win the FA Cup for the first time in their history, beating Preston North End 3–2 at Wembley Stadium.
  - The Queen and Prince Philip, Duke of Edinburgh's seven-week-old son is christened Edward Antony Richard Louis; later he is created Earl of Wessex and Duke of Edinburgh.
- 5 May – Granada Television airs the first in what will become a series of documentary interviews with a generation of children, Seven Up!
- 6 May – Joe Orton's black comedy Entertaining Mr Sloane premieres at the New Arts Theatre in London.
- 11 May – Terence Conran opens the first Habitat store on London's Fulham Road.
- 12 May – "Pirate" radio station Radio Atlanta begins broadcasting from MV Mi Amigo anchored off Frinton-on-Sea; in July, its operations are merged with Radio Caroline.
- 15 May – Lord Justice Pearson reports on the power dispute.
- 16–18 May – Violent disturbances between Mods and Rockers in Brighton.
- 27 May – "Pirate" radio station Radio Sutch begins broadcasting from Shivering Sands Army Fort in the Thames Estuary.
- 29 May – The official opening of the UK's first undercover shopping centre, at the Bull Ring, Birmingham.

=== June ===
- 17 June – A missing persons investigation is launched in Fallowfield, Manchester, as police search for 12-year-old Keith Bennett who was last seen on his way to his grandmother's house yesterday evening; he is a victim of the Moors murders.

=== July ===
- Undated
  - Resale Prices Act ends most resale price maintenance.
  - Helen Brook sets up the first Brook Advisory Centre offering teenage contraception and sexual health advice.
- 6 July
  - Malawi gains its independence.
  - The Beatles' first film, A Hard Day's Night, is released.
- 10 July – More than 300 people are injured in Liverpool when a crowd of some 150,000 people welcome The Beatles back to their home city.
- 15 July – The Post Office Tower in London is completed, although it does not begin operations until October 1965.
- 27 July – Former Prime Minister Sir Winston Churchill is present in the House of Commons for the last time at the age of 89, having been an MP for 63 of the last 65 years. On the following day, he receives a Parliamentary resolution recording his service to the House and nation and marking his retirement.

=== August ===
- 4 August
  - The first portable televisions go on sale.
  - Release of London group The Kinks' successful single "You Really Got Me", written by Ray Davies.
- 13 August – Peter Anthony Allen, at Walton Prison in Liverpool, and Gwynne Owen Evans, at Strangeways Prison in Manchester, are hanged for the murder of John Alan West on 7 April, the last executions to take place in the British Isles.
- 22 August – The first Match of the Day airs on BBC2.

=== September ===
- The British Motor Corporation (BMC) launches the BMC ADO17 family saloon, initially as the Austin 1800, this again wins BMC the European Car of the Year award in its second year.
- 4 September – The Forth Road Bridge opens over the Firth of Forth, linking Fife and Edinburgh.
- 14 September – The final edition of the left-wing Daily Herald newspaper is published.
- 15 September
  - The Sun newspaper goes into circulation, replacing the Daily Herald.
  - Sir Alec Douglas-Home calls a general election for 15 October.
- 17 September – Goldfinger, the third James Bond film, premieres at Odeon Leicester Square in London.
- 20 September – At the autumnal equinox, the Order of Bards, Ovates and Druids (OBOD) is founded in England, as the equivalent of Wales's Gorsedd of Bards.
- 21 September – Malta obtains independence from the UK.
- 29 September – An announcement is made that American car manufacturer Chrysler is taking a substantial share in the British Rootes Group combine which includes the Hillman, Singer and Sunbeam marques.

=== October ===
- 10–24 October – Great Britain competes at the Olympics in Tokyo and wins 4 gold, 12 silver and 2 bronze medals.
- 15 October – 1964 United Kingdom general election. The Labour Party defeats the Conservatives and Harold Wilson becomes Prime Minister, having gained a majority of five seats. The election result spells the end of 13 years of Conservative government, although the Prime Minister Alec Douglas-Home had entered office only 12 months ago. A surprise casualty as MP is Patrick Gordon Walker who was widely expected to become the Foreign Secretary in a future Labour government, but loses his Smethwick seat to the Conservatives following a controversial racially motivated campaign by the opposing party's supporters.
- 17 October – Harold Wilson's cabinet is announced: it includes James Callaghan (who missed out on the Labour leadership in February 1963), Denis Healey, Barbara Castle and Roy Jenkins. Jim Griffiths becomes the first Secretary of State for Wales.
- 18 October – Harold Wilson creates the Welsh Office.
- 24 October – Northern Rhodesia, a former British protectorate, becomes the independent Republic of Zambia, ending 73 years of British rule.
- 29 October – Dorothy Crowfoot Hodgkin wins the Nobel Prize in Chemistry, the first British woman to win a Nobel "for her determinations by X-ray techniques of the structures of important biochemical substances". The Daily Mail headlines this as "Oxford Housewife Wins Nobel".

=== November ===
- 2 November – The ITV soap opera Crossroads airs for the first time. It will run until 1988 and be revived in 2001, ending again in 2003.
- 9 November – The House of Commons votes to abolish the death penalty for murder in Britain. The last execution took place in August and the death penalty is set to be officially abolished before the end of next year with the number of executions having gradually fallen during the last decade.
- 27 November – Power unions announce that they will start balloting for a strike.
- 30 November – The power dispute is settled and strike action called off.

=== December ===
- 16 December – Government, Trades Union Congress and employers produce a joint Statement of Intent on Productivity, Prices and Incomes.
- 21 December – MPs vote 355 to 170 for the abolition of the death penalty, with the abolition likely to be confirmed before the end of next year. The death penalty has gradually fallen out of use over the last twenty years, with the two most recent executions having taken place in August.
- 23 December
  - Richard Beeching announces his intention to resign as Chairman of the British Railways Board after three-and-a-half years, during which he proposed the closure of many smaller and financially non-viable railway lines as well as many passenger services on surviving lines.
  - 'Pirate' radio station Wonderful Radio London begins broadcasting from MV Galaxy anchored off Frinton-on-Sea, with a Fab 40 playlist of popular records.
- 24 December – The Beatles gain the Christmas number one for the second year running with "I Feel Fine" which has topped the singles charts for the third week running. They have now had six number one singles in the United Kingdom alone.
- 26 December – Police launch a missing persons investigation after ten-year-old Lesley Ann Downey goes missing from a fairground near her home in Ancoats, Manchester; she is a victim of the Moors murders.
- 31 December – Donald Campbell sets the world speed record on water at 276.33 mph on Dumbleyung Lake in Australia.

=== Undated ===
- Hanson Trust set up by James Hanson and Gordon White to purchase underperforming companies and turn them around.
- Centre for Contemporary Cultural Studies established at the University of Birmingham by Richard Hoggart.
- Daihatsu becomes the first Japanese carmaker to import passenger cars to the United Kingdom, launching its Compagno on the British market.
- Some 90% of British households now own a television, compared to around 25% in 1953 and 65% in 1959.

== Publications ==
- Agatha Christie's Miss Marple novel A Caribbean Mystery.
- J. W. B. Douglas's cohort study The Home and the School: a study of ability and attainment in the primary school.
- Ian Fleming's James Bond novel You Only Live Twice and his children's novel Chitty-Chitty-Bang-Bang (the latter posthumously).
- William Golding's novel The Spire.
- Philip Larkin's poetry collection The Whitsun Weddings.
- Ruth Rendell's first novel From Doon with Death.
- The research study London: aspects of change, introducing Ruth Glass's concept of gentrification.

== Births ==
- 8 January – Marc Quinn, sculptor
- 14 January – Mark Addy, actor
- 17 January – Andy Rourke, musician (died 2023)
- 18 January
  - Richard Dunwoody, jockey
  - Jane Horrocks, actress
- 26 January – Adam Crozier, businessman
- 28 January – David Lawrence, cricketer (died 2025)
- 29 January – John Anthony Gallagher, English-New Zealand rugby player
- 5 February – Martha Fiennes, film director
- 7 February – Ray Mears, woodman and television presenter
- 9 February – Mark Carleton-Smith, soldier, Chief of the General Staff
- 16 February – Christopher Eccleston, actor
- 18 February – Tommy Scott, British musician and frontman of Space
- 22 February – Diane Charlemagne, singer (52nd Street, Urban Cookie Collective) (died 2015)
- 25 February – Lee Evans, comedian and actor
- 29 February – James Ogilvy, son of Princess Alexandra, the Honourable Lady Ogilvy and Sir Angus Ogilvy
- 10 March – Prince Edward (later Earl of Wessex and Duke of Edinburgh), youngest son of the Queen
- 11 March
  - Emma Chambers, actress (died 2018)
  - Shane Richie, actor
- 17 March – Lee Dixon, English footballer
- 18 March – Courtney Pine, jazz saxophonist
- 19 March – Jake Weber, actor
- 26 March – Martin Donnelly, Northern Irish racing driver
- 27 March – Clive Rowe, actor
- 28 March – Karen Lumley, politician (died 2023)
- 3 April – Nigel Farage, United Kingdom Independence Party leader and MEP for South East England
- 4 April – Paul Parker, footballer
- 9 April – Dan Pearson, landscape designer
- 13 April
  - Andy Goram, Scottish footballer (died 2022)
  - John Swinney, Scottish politician
- 18 April – Niall Ferguson, Scottish historian
- 20 April – Andy Serkis, English film actor
- 25 April – Andy Bell, singer-songwriter (Yazoo, Erasure)
- 28 April – Lady Helen Taylor, daughter of the Duke and Duchess of Kent
- 1 May – Lady Sarah Chatto, daughter of Antony Armstrong-Jones and Princess Margaret
- 6 May – Diane Holl, engineer
- 8 May – Dave Rowntree, drummer (Blur)
- 11 May – John Parrott, snooker player and broadcaster
- 15 May – Jill McDonald, businesswoman
- 20 May
  - Charles Spencer, 9th Earl Spencer, aristocrat, author, print journalist and broadcaster, younger brother of Diana, Princess of Wales
  - Mike Gregory, English rugby player and coach (died 2007)
- 21 May – Danny Bailey, English footballer
- 24 May – Adrian Moorhouse, swimmer
- 28 May – Clive Oppenheimer, vulcanologist
- 30 May – Mark Sheppard, British-American actor and musician
- 10 June – Ben Daniels, actor
- 13 June – Kathy Burke, actress and comedian
- 14 June – Peter Gilliver, lexicographer and academic
- 19 June – Boris Johnson, Prime Minister of the United Kingdom from 2019 to 2022
- 21 June
  - Sammi Davis, actress
  - Tania Mathias, ophthalmologist and Conservative Party politician
  - David Morrissey, actor, director, producer and screenwriter
  - Keith Stevens, English footballer
- 22 June
  - Paterson Joseph, actor
  - John Penrose, politician, Minister for Tourism and Heritage
- 23 June – Jane Garvey, radio presenter
- 24 June
  - Hamish Harding, businessman, pilot and explorer (died 2023)
  - Christopher Steele, intelligence officer
- 25 June – Johnny Herbert, racing driver and commentator
- 3 July – Joanne Harris, novelist
- 7 July – Rob Newman, comedian, actor and author
- 11 July – Craig Charles, actor, comedian and broadcaster
- 12 July – Gaby Roslin, TV presenter
- 14 July – Matt Pritchett, pocket cartoonist
- 17 July – Andy Abraham, singer
- 21 July – Ross Kemp, actor
- 22 July – Bonnie Langford, actress and entertainer
- 23 July
  - Dom Phillips, journalist (died 2022)
  - Matilda Ziegler, actress
- 25 July – Martin Samuel, sports journalist
- 3 August – Ralph Knibbs, rugby union player
- 16 August – Barry Venison, English footballer and journalist
- 20 August – Flaminia Cinque, actress
- 22 August – Diane Setterfield, novelist and educator
- 25 August – Clive Myrie, journalist and television presenter
- 26 August – Allegra Huston, English-American author
- 1 September
  - Sue Carr, judge
  - Gary Mavers, actor
  - Nigel Rhodes, actor and guitarist
- 8 September – Peter Murrell, Scottish politician
- 10 September – Edmund de Waal, potter and writer
- 13 September – Richard Tice, businessman and politician
- 19 September – Simon Singh, popular science author
- 23 September – Clayton Blackmore, footballer
- 30 September – Ian McCall, Scottish footballer and manager
- 1 October – Harry Hill, comedian, writer and actor
- 3 October – Clive Owen, English actor
- 7 October – Paul Stewart, English footballer
- 8 October – Martin Marquez, English actor
- 10 October – Sarah Lancashire, English actress
- 16 October – Steve Lamacq, radio DJ
- 17 October – Gregg Wallace, English broadcaster
- 21 October – Mark Sedwill, Cabinet Secretary
- 22 October
  - Mick Hill, English javelin thrower and coach
  - Craig Levein, Scottish footballer
  - Paul McStay, Scottish footballer
- 24 October
  - Grant Gee, film maker, photographer and cinematographer
  - Paul Vigay, computer programmer (died 2009)
- 28 October – Andrew Bridgen, politician
- 29 October – Yasmin Le Bon, model
- 7 November – Philip Hollobone, Conservative politician and MP for Kettering
- 19 November
  - Susie Dent, lexicographer
  - Nicholas Patrick, astronaut
- 21 November
  - Sean Foley, director, writer, comedian and actor
  - Liza Tarbuck, actress and broadcaster
- 24 November – Alistair McGowan, actor and comedian
- 26 November – Gary Love, actor and film director
- 4 December – Scott Hastings, Scottish rugby union player (died 2026)
- 7 December – Hugo Blick, filmmaker
- 9 December – Josie Cichockyj, wheelchair athlete (died 2014)
- 18 December – Robson Green, actor and television presenter
- 21 December – Rob Kelly, footballer and manager
- 25 December
  - Ian Bostridge, tenor
  - Gary McAllister, Scottish footballer, manager and coach
  - Kevin Simms, English rugby player
  - Bob Stanley, English keyboard player, songwriter, producer, and journalist
- 30 December – Sophie Ward, actress
- Undated
  - Gillian Reid, Scottish-born chemist
  - Nitin Sawhney, British Indian musician, producer and composer

== Deaths ==
- 7 January – Cyril Davies, blues musician (born 1932)
- 9 January – Hubert Phillips, economist, journalist, bridge player and composer of puzzles (born 1891)
- 17 January – T. H. White, novelist (born 1906)
- 20 February – Verena Holmes, mechanical engineer and inventor (born 1889)
- 22 February – Verrier Elwin, anthropologist and missionary (born 1902)
- 26 February – F. F. E. Yeo-Thomas, World War II hero (born 1901)
- 21 March – Nancy Spain (born 1917) and Joan Werner Laurie (born 1920), journalists, in the crash of a light plane near Aintree
- 9 June – Max Aitken, 1st Baron Beaverbrook, Canadian-British business tycoon, politician and writer (born 1879)
- 27 June – Mona Barrie, English actress (born 1909)
- 21 July – John White, footballer (born 1937)
- 12 August – Ian Fleming, author and journalist (born 1908)
- 31 August – Peter Lanyon, painter (born 1918)
- 9 September – Sir George Abercromby, 8th Baronet (born 1886)
- 18 September – Clive Bell, art critic (born 1881)
- 2 November – Charles Walter Allfrey, general (born 1895)
- 5 November – Mabel Lucie Attwell, illustrator (born 1879)
- 1 December – J. B. S. Haldane, geneticist (born 1892)
- 8 December – Simon Marks, 1st Baron Marks of Broughton, businessman (born 1888)
- 9 December – Edith Sitwell, poet (born 1887)
- 21 December – Algernon Kingscote, tennis champion (born 1888)
- 24 December – Claudia Jones, black activist (born 1915)

== See also ==
- 1964 in British music
- 1964 in British television
- List of British films of 1964
