= 1964 Grand National =

English steeplechase horse race

- Grand National
- Location: Aintree Racecourse
- Date: 21 March 1964
- Winning horse: Team Spirit
- Starting price: 18/1
- Jockey: (Republic of Ireland) Willie Robinson
- Trainer: (England) Fulke Walwyn
- Owner: John Goodman
- Conditions: Good to soft

External videos
- BBC
- British Pathe Highlights

The 1964 Grand National was the 118th renewal of the Grand National horse race that took place at Aintree Racecourse near Liverpool, England, on 21 March 1964. Thirty-three horses ran and the race was won narrowly by American-owned 12-year-old Team Spirit, at odds of 18/1. He was ridden by jockey Willie Robinson and trained by Fulke Walwyn.

The journalist and broadcaster Nancy Spain and her partner, the magazine editor Joan Werner Laurie, were among five people killed when their light aircraft crashed near the racecourse on the day of the race, which they were travelling to attend.

== Finishing order ==
Position	Name	Jockey	Age	Handicap (st-lb)	SP	Distance
01	Team Spirit	Willie Robinson	12	10-3	18/1	
02	Purple Silk	John Kenneally	9	10-4	100/6	
03	Peacetown	Roy Edwards	10	10-1	40/1	
04	Eternal	Steve Davenport	13	10-2	66/1	
05	Pontin-Go	Peter Jones	12	10-0	66/1	
06	Springbok	Gerry Scott	10	10-11	100/6	
07	April Rose	Eddie Harty	9	10-0	22/1	
08	Baxier	William McLernon	8	10-0	40/1	
09	Crobeg	John Lawrence	11	10-4	50/1	
10	Pappageno's Cottage	Pat Taaffe	9	11-10	100/7	
11	John O'Groats	Paul Kelleway	10	10-3	22/1	
12	Supersweet	Paddy Broderick	7	10-1	40/1	
13	Claymore	Colin Davies	11	10-0	50/1	
14	Out And About	Bruce Gregory	9	10-1	33/1	
15	Sea Knight	Paul Nicholson	9	11-10	66/1	Last to complete

== Non-finishers ==
Fence	Name	Jockey	Age	Handicap (st-lb)	Starting price	Fate
12	Pas Seul	David Dick	11	12-0	22/1	Fell
01	Flying Wild	David Mould	8	11-3	100/7	Fell
04	Laffy	Bill Rees	8	10-8	100/7	Fell
15	Ayala	David Nicholson	10	10-7	33/1	Fell
21	Kilmore	Fred Winter	14	10-7	100/6	Fell
15	Border Flight	Paddy Farrell	9	10-3	100/6	Fell
15	Lizawake	Bobby Beasley	11	10-4	18/1	Fell
28	Dancing Rain	Owen McNally	9	10-0	66/1	Refused
09	Centre Circle	John Haine	9	10-0	40/1	Fell
22	Time	Michael Scudamore	9	10-4	100/7	Fell
23	Reproduction	Robin Langley	11	10-0	66/1	Fell
27	Merganser	Johnny Lehane	11	10-0	66/1	Pulled Up
27	Gale Force X	Bobby Coonan	7	10-0	50/1	Unseated Rider
23	Groomsman	Francis Shortt	9	10-0	66/1	Fell
27	Red Thorn	Terry Biddlecombe	8	10-3	33/1	Pulled Up
27	Reprieved	Phil Harvey	11	10-0	66/1	Pulled Up
12	Beau Normand	Jeff King	8	10-10	100/6	Refused
25	L'Empereur	Jean Daumas	10	10-5	40/1	Pulled Up

== Media coverage ==
Grand National Grandstand on the BBC again provided the television coverage. For the third year running the commentary team remained unchanged with Peter O'Sullevan leading them off and finishing the race, Bob Haynes calling them over the first four fences before Peter Montague-Evans took them over the signature fences out in the country, Becher's Brook, Canal Turn and Valentine's Brook before handing back to O'Sullevan in the grandstand once they reached the Anchor Bridge crossing.
