= The Virago Book of Friendship =

The Virago Book of Friendship is a book of essays about friendships between women, edited by Rachel Cooke and published by Virago Books in 2024.

Cooke includes previously published material. Frances Wilson of Literary Review characterised most of the content as being portions of novels. Other content includes comic strips, graphic novels, letters, magazine columns, portions of plays, and poetry. The materials are organised by stages of life covered as opposed to the dates when the works were first published.

Sam Leith, in The Spectator, wrote that the book's style is "very dip-in-and-out-able" and "spry".

== Contents ==
Cooke wrote the introduction, saying that there had mostly been coverage of friendships among men as opposed to those among women. The introduction stated that the 1991 anthology The Oxford Book of Friendship had relatively little content about friendships between women. 49 women were among the 300 authors chronicled by that book, and one chapter involved a friendship between women; Leith stated that chapter is "brief". It also discusses how technology changed the nature of friendship.

Each section includes a short essay.

"Definitions", which describes how friendships are defined, is the first chapter.

== Release ==
Hardback and paperback versions of the book exist. Cooke died in November 2025, after the initial release of the book.

== Reception ==
Ceci Browning, in The Times, praised the book as having organisation that was done "immaculately" as well as having a "breadth of Cooke’s research" and a "rhythm" made of a "smorgasbord of sources". She stated that chapter one is, of all chapters in the book, "the strongest." She argued that "A couple of these sections fall flat".

== See also ==
- Her Brilliant Career - A book written by Cooke
