= List of British films of 1964 =

A list of films produced in the United Kingdom in 1964 (see 1964 in film):

== 1964 ==
Title	Director	Cast	Genre	Notes
1964
633 Squadron	Walter Grauman	Cliff Robertson, George Chakiris	World War II drama	
The 7th Dawn	Lewis Gilbert	William Holden, Susannah York	Adventure	
The Bargee	Duncan Wood	Harry H. Corbett, Hugh Griffith, Eric Sykes, Ronnie Barker	Comedy	
The Beauty Jungle	Val Guest	Ian Hendry, Janette Scott	Comedy/drama	
Becket	Peter Glenville	Richard Burton, Peter O'Toole, John Gielgud	Drama	
The Black Torment	Robert Hartford-Davis	John Turner, Heather Sears	Horror	
Carry On Cleo	Gerald Thomas	Sid James, Kenneth Williams	Comedy	
Carry On Spying	Gerald Thomas	Kenneth Williams, Barbara Windsor	Comedy	
The Chalk Garden	Ronald Neame	John Mills, Deborah Kerr, Hayley Mills	Drama	
Coast of Skeletons	Robert Lynn	Richard Todd, Dale Robertson	Adventure	British-German co-production
The Comedy Man	Alvin Rakoff	Kenneth More, Cecil Parker, Dennis Price	Drama	
Crooks in Cloisters	Jeremy Summers	Ronald Fraser, Barbara Windsor	Comedy	
The Curse of the Mummy's Tomb	Michael Carreras	Terence Morgan, Ronald Howard	Horror	
Daylight Robbery	Michael Truman	Kirk Martin, Darryl Read, Trudy Moors, Janet Hannington	Crime	
Delayed Flight	Michael Luckwell, Anthony Young	Helen Cherry, Hugh McDermott	Thriller	
Devil Doll	Lindsay Shonteff	Bryant Haliday, William Sylvester	Horror	
The Devil-Ship Pirates	Don Sharp	Christopher Lee, Barry Warren	Adventure	
Do You Know This Voice?	Frank Nesbitt	Dan Duryea, Isa Miranda	Crime	
Dr. Strangelove	Stanley Kubrick	Peter Sellers, George C. Scott, Sterling Hayden	Black comedy	
The Earth Dies Screaming	Terence Fisher	Willard Parker, Virginia Field, Dennis Price	Sci-fi	
East of Sudan	Nathan Juran	Anthony Quayle, Sylvia Syms	Adventure	
The Evil of Frankenstein	Freddie Francis	Peter Cushing, Sandor Eles	Horror	
The Eyes of Annie Jones	Reginald LeBorg	Richard Conte, Francesca Annis	Mystery	
Father Came Too!	Peter Graham Scott	James Robertson Justice, Stanley Baxter	Comedy	
First Men in the Moon	Nathan H. Juran	Lionel Jeffries, Edward Judd	Sci-fi/fantasy	
Five Have a Mystery to Solve	Ernest Morris	David Palmer, Darryl Read	Family	
French Dressing	Ken Russell	James Booth, Marisa Mell	Comedy	
Frozen Alive	Bernard Knowles	Mark Stevens, Marianne Koch	Sci-fi	Co-production with West Germany
Girl with Green Eyes	Desmond Davis	Peter Finch, Rita Tushingham	Drama	
Goldfinger	Guy Hamilton	Sean Connery, Honor Blackman, Gert Fröbe	Spy/action	Number 70 in the list of BFI Top 100 British films
The Gorgon	Terence Fisher	Peter Cushing, Christopher Lee	Horror	
Guns at Batasi	John Guillermin	Richard Attenborough, Jack Hawkins	Drama	
A Hard Day's Night	Richard Lester	The Beatles	Musical/comedy	Number 88 in the list of BFI Top 100 British films
Hide and Seek	Cy Endfield	Ian Carmichael, Curd Jürgens	Action	
The High Bright Sun	Ralph Thomas	Dirk Bogarde, George Chakiris, Susan Strasberg	Thriller	
A Home of Your Own	Jay Lewis	Ronnie Barker, George Benson	Comedy	
Hot Enough for June	Ralph Thomas	Dirk Bogarde, Robert Morley	Comedy	
A Jolly Bad Fellow	Don Chaffey	Leo McKern, Janet Munro	Comedy	
King and Country	Joseph Losey	Dirk Bogarde, Tom Courtenay	Drama	
The Leather Boys	Sidney J. Furie	Rita Tushingham, Dudley Sutton	Drama	
The Long Ships	Jack Cardiff	Richard Widmark, Sidney Poitier	Adventure	
Man in the Middle	Guy Hamilton	Robert Mitchum, France Nuyen	War	
The Masque of the Red Death	Roger Corman	Vincent Price, Hazel Court	Horror	
Master Spy	Montgomery Tully	Stephen Murray, June Thorburn	Espionage	
Murder Ahoy!	George Pollock	Margaret Rutherford, Stringer Davis	Mystery	
Murder Most Foul	George Pollock	Margaret Rutherford, Stringer Davis	Mystery	
Never Put It in Writing	Andrew L. Stone	Pat Boone, Milo O'Shea, John Le Mesurier	Comedy	
Night Must Fall	Karel Reisz	Albert Finney, Susan Hampshire	Thriller	Entered into the 14th Berlin International Film Festival
Night Train to Paris	Robert Douglas	Leslie Nielsen, Aliza Gur	Thriller	
Nightmare	Freddie Francis	Moira Redmond, Jennie Linden	Thriller	
Nothing But the Best	Clive Donner	Alan Bates, Denholm Elliott, Harry Andrews	Comedy	
Of Human Bondage	Ken Hughes	Laurence Harvey, Kim Novak	Drama	Third screen adaptation of the Somerset Maugham novel
One Way Pendulum	Peter Yates	Eric Sykes, George Cole	Comedy	
Psyche 59	Alexander Singer	Curd Jürgens, Patricia Neal	Drama	
The Pumpkin Eater	Jack Clayton	Anne Bancroft, Peter Finch, James Mason	Drama	Bancroft won the award for Best Actress at the 1964 Cannes Film Festival.
Rattle of a Simple Man	Muriel Box	Diane Cilento, Harry H. Corbett	Comedy	
Ring of Spies	Robert Tronson	Bernard Lee, William Sylvester	Spy	
Saturday Night Out	Robert Hartford-Davis	Heather Sears, Bernard Lee	Comedy/drama	
The Scarlet Blade	John Gilling	Jack Hedley, Oliver Reed, Lionel Jeffries	Action	
Séance on a Wet Afternoon	Bryan Forbes	Kim Stanley, Richard Attenborough	Crime/drama	
The Secret of Blood Island	Quentin Lawrence	Jack Hedley, Barbara Shelley	War	
Shadow of Fear	Ernest Morris	Paul Maxwell, Clare Owen	Drama	
Smokescreen	Jim O'Connolly	Peter Vaughan, John Carson, Yvonne Romain	Crime/drama	
The System	Michael Winner	Oliver Reed, Jane Merrow	Drama	
The Third Secret	Charles Crichton	Stephen Boyd, Jack Hawkins	Drama	
This Is My Street	Sidney Hayers	Ian Hendry, June Ritchie	Drama	
The Three Lives of Thomasina	Don Chaffey	Patrick McGoohan, Karen Dotrice	Family	Co-production with the United States
The Tomb of Ligeia	Roger Corman	Vincent Price, Elizabeth Shepherd	Horror	
Tomorrow at Ten	Lance Comfort	John Gregson, Robert Shaw, Alec Clunes	Thriller	
Traitor's Gate	Freddie Francis	Albert Lieven, Gary Raymond	Crime	Co-production with West Germany; also known as Das Verrätertor
Troubled Waters	Stanley Goulder	Tab Hunter, Zena Walker	Crime	
The Verdict	David Eady	Cec Linder, Zena Marshall, Nigel Davenport	Thriller	
Victim Five	Robert Lynn	Lex Barker, Ronald Fraser	Action	
We Shall See	Quentin Lawrence	Maurice Kaufmann, Faith Brook	Drama	
Witchcraft	Don Sharp	Lon Chaney Jr., Jack Hedley	Horror	
Woman of Straw	Basil Dearden	Gina Lollobrigida, Sean Connery, Ralph Richardson	Mystery	
Wonderful Life	Sidney J. Furie	Cliff Richard, Susan Hampshire	Musical	
The Yellow Rolls-Royce	Anthony Asquith	Rex Harrison, Jeanne Moreau, Alain Delon	Drama	Film with three episodes, set in London, Naples and Yugoslavia
Zorba the Greek	Michael Cacoyannis	Anthony Quinn, Alan Bates	Adventure	Co-production with U.S. and Greece
Zulu	Cy Endfield	Stanley Baker, Jack Hawkins, Michael Caine	Historical	Michael Caine's first starring role; Number 31 in the list of BFI Top 100 British films

== See also ==
- 1964 in British music
- 1964 in British radio
- 1964 in British television
- 1964 in the United Kingdom
