= Nancy Spain =

English broadcaster and journalist (1917–1964)

- Born: Nancy Brooker Spain; 13 September 1917; Jesmond, Newcastle upon Tyne, Northumberland, England
- Died: 21 March 1964 (aged 46); Aintree, Lancashire, England
- Resting place: Horseley, near Rochester, Northumberland, England
- Occupations: Journalist, author and broadcaster
- Partner: Joan Werner Laurie
- Military career
- Allegiance: United Kingdom
- Branch: Royal Navy
- Service years: 1939–1945
- Conflicts: World War 2

Nancy Brooker Spain (13 September 1917 – 21 March 1964) was a prominent English broadcaster and journalist. She was a columnist for the Daily Express, She magazine, and the News of the World in the 1950s and 1960s. She also appeared on many radio broadcasts, particularly on Woman's Hour and My Word!, and later as a panellist on the television programmes What's My Line? and Juke Box Jury. Spain died in a plane crash near Aintree racecourse while travelling to the 1964 Grand National.

== Early life ==
Spain was born in Jesmond, Newcastle upon Tyne, the younger of the two daughters of Lieutenant-Colonel George Redesdale Brooker Spain, a freeman of the city and prominent figure in local military and antiquarian affairs. Her father was a writer himself and appeared in a number of radio plays as well as broadcasting commentaries on Newcastle United games. Her mother, Norah Smiles, was the daughter of Lucy Dorling (a half-sister of Isabella Beeton) and William Holmes Smiles (son of Samuel Smiles).

Spain went to Roedean School (a family tradition) from 1931 to 1935, where she began wearing "mannish" clothes, and developed a clear and rich speaking voice that stood her in good stead in her eventual media career. She played lacrosse for Northumberland and Durham, and hockey for the North of England, as well as playing tennis and cricket. She also acted on BBC radio, where she took over star parts vacated by Esther McCracken. She was a sports reporter for the Newcastle Journal. During the Second World War, she served in the WRNS as a driver and was then commissioned and worked in the WRNS press office in London. Near the end of the war, she was discharged from the navy on health grounds, having been affected by asthma attacks.

== Post-war career ==
After the war, Spain published a volume of memoirs about her naval service, called Thank You, Nelson. It received an enthusiastic review from A. A. Milne in The Sunday Times and unexpectedly became a best-seller. She followed this up with a series of detective novels set at a girls' school, Radcliff Hall, a thinly disguised Roedean (the name a presumed allusion to Radclyffe Hall). The biographer Rachel Cooke described Spain's ten detective novels as "eccentric and outrageously camp", most notably Poison for Teacher (1949). She invented as her sleuths a revue star called Miriam Birdseye and her friend, a Russian ballerina, Natasha Nevkorina. Birdseye was based on Hermione Gingold, who had become a good friend of Spain and had urged her to portray her in a book.

The success of the novels helped Spain become a star columnist for the Daily Express, She and the News of the World in the 1950s and 1960s. She made many radio broadcasts, particularly on Woman's Hour and My Word!. She later appeared as a panellist on BBC TV's record review programme Juke Box Jury and the panel game What's My Line?.

Her column-writing caused the Daily Express to be sued successfully for libel – twice – by Evelyn Waugh. As well as Spain's books of memoirs, including Why I'm Not a Millionaire (1956), she wrote a biography of her great-aunt, Isabella Beeton (original author of the encyclopaedic Mrs Beeton's Book of Household Management). Rose Collis wrote a biography of Spain in 1997.

== Personal life ==
In the late 1930s, Spain's love of sport led to her first love affair, with a tennis buff, the twenty-three-year-old Winifred "Bin" Sargeant, described by a biographer as "a golden-haired, blue-eyed, middle-class girl from West Hartlepool who drove a green sports car, had a fondness for gin and tonic, and whose proficiency at tennis was such that she had tried, more than once, to qualify for Wimbledon". Later, when often in the news and tempted to marry to seem respectable – Spain's name was linked with that of her close but platonic friend, broadcaster Gilbert Harding – she lived openly with the editor of She, Joan Werner Laurie ("Jonnie"), and was a friend of the famous, including Noël Coward and Marlene Dietrich. Spain and Laurie lived in an extended household with the theatre manager and rally driver Sheila van Damm, and their sons Nicholas (born 1946) and Thomas (born in 1952). Nicholas was Laurie's son; Thomas was also described as Laurie's son, but was in fact Spain's son after a brief affair with Philip ("Pip") Youngman Carter, husband of Margery Allingham; he did not find out his true parentage until around six years after her death.

Spain died, with Laurie and three others, on 21 March 1964. They were flying in a Piper Apache aeroplane which crashed near Aintree racecourse, near Liverpool, killing all on board. The aircraft (G-ASHC) had taken off from Luton Airport and was on approach to land at the racecourse. Spain was travelling there to cover the 1964 Grand National, which was taking place that day. She was cremated with Laurie at Golders Green Crematorium, London, and her ashes were buried in the family grave in The Church of The Holy Trinity, Horsley, near Rochester, Northumberland.

Noël Coward summed up in his diary: "It is cruel that all that gaiety, intelligence and vitality should be snuffed out when so many bores and horrors are left living".

She is the inspiration of the song "Nancy Spain" written by Barney Rushe and performed by, among others, Christy Moore.

== Bibliography ==
Novels

- Death Before Wicket (1946)
- Poison in Play (1945)
- Murder, Bless It (1948)
- Death Goes on Skis (1949)
- Poison for Teacher (1949)
- Cinderella Goes to the Morgue (Minutes to Murder) (1950)
- R in the Month (1950)
- Not Wanted on Voyage (1951)
- Out, Damned Tot (1952)
- The Tiger Who Couldn't Eat Meat (1954)
- The Kat Strikes (1955)
- My Boy Mo (1959)
- Minutes to Midnight (rpt 1978)

Non-fiction

- Thank You, Nelson (1945)
- Mrs Beeton and Her Husband (1948)
- Teach Tennant: The Story of Eleanor Tennant, the Greatest Tennis Coach in the World (1953)
- The Beeton Story (1956)
- Why I'm Not A Millionaire (1956)
- The Nancy Spain Colour Cookery Book (1962)
- The Beaver Annual (ed) (1962)
- The Butlin Beaver Annual (ed) (1963)
- A Funny Thing Happened on the Way (1964)
- The Nancy Spain All Colour Cookery Book (1967)

== Sources ==
- Cooke, Rachel (2013). Her Brilliant Career: Ten Extraordinary Women of the Fifties. London: Virago Press. pp. 45–90. ISBN 978-1-84-408741-9.
- Coward, Noël (1982). Graham Payn; Sheridan Morley (eds.). The Noël Coward Diaries. London: Methuen. ISBN 978-0-297-78142-4.
- Craig, Patricia; Mary Cadogan (1981). The Lady Investigates: Women Detectives and Spies in Fiction. Oxford: Oxford University Press. ISBN 0-19-281938-0.
- Collis, Rose (1997). A Trouser-Wearing Character: The Life and Times of Nancy Spain. London: Cassell. ISBN 0-304-32879-0.
