= 633 Squadron =

1964 film by Walter Grauman

- Theatrical release poster
- Directed by: Walter Grauman
- Written by: James Clavell; Howard Koch
- Based on: the novel 633 Squadron by Frederick E. Smith
- Produced by: Cecil F. Ford; Lewis J. Rachmil
- Starring: Cliff Robertson; George Chakiris
- Cinematography: Edward Scaife
- Edited by: Bert Bates
- Music by: Ron Goodwin
- Production company: Mirisch Films
- Distributed by: United Artists
- Release dates: 4 June 1964; (world premiere, London)
- Running time: 102 minutes
- Countries: United Kingdom; United States
- Language: English
- Budget: $1,300,000
- Box office: $1,700,000 (US/Canada) (This figure is rentals accruing to distributors, not total gross.)

633 Squadron is a 1964 war film directed by Walter Grauman and starring Cliff Robertson, George Chakiris, and Maria Perschy. The plot, which involves the exploits of a fictional World War II British fighter-bomber squadron, was based on the 1956 novel of the same name by former Royal Air Force officer Frederick E. Smith, which itself drew on several real RAF operations. The film was produced by Cecil F. Ford for the second film of Mirisch Productions UK subsidiary Mirisch Films for United Artists. 633 Squadron was the first aviation film to be shot in colour and Panavision widescreen.

== Plot ==
After the Norwegian resistance leader Royal Norwegian Navy Lieutenant Erik Bergman travels to Great Britain to report the location of a German V-2 rocket fuel plant, the Royal Air Force's No. 633 Squadron is assigned to destroy it. The squadron is led by Wing Commander Roy Grant, a former Eagle Squadron pilot (an American serving in the RAF before the US entered the war).

The plant is in a seemingly impregnable location beneath an overhanging cliff at the end of a long, narrow fjord lined with numerous anti-aircraft guns. The only way to destroy the plant is by bombing the cliff until it collapses and buries the facility, a job for 633 Squadron's fast and manoeuvrable de Havilland Mosquitos. The squadron trains in Scotland, where there are narrow glens similar to the fjord. There, Grant is introduced to Bergman's sister, Hilde. They are attracted to each other, despite Grant's aversion to wartime relationships.

The Norwegian resistance is assigned the task of destroying the anti-aircraft defences immediately before the attack. When unexpected German reinforcements arrive, Bergman returns to Norway to try to gather more forces. He is captured while transporting desperately needed weapons, taken to Gestapo headquarters and tortured for information. Since Bergman knows too much, he must be silenced before he breaks. Grant and newly married Pilot Officer Bissell are sent in with a single Mosquito to bomb the Gestapo building. Though they are successful, their shot-up Mosquito fighter-bomber crashes on its return; Bissell is wounded and becomes blind. A tearful Hilde thanks Grant for ending her brother's suffering.

Still worried, Air Vice-Marshal Davis decides to move up the attack to the next day. The resistance fighters are ambushed and killed, leaving the defences intact. Although Grant is given the option of aborting, he decides to press on. The factory is destroyed at the cost of the entire squadron, though a few crews are able to ditch in the fjord. Grant crash-lands; a local man helps Grant's navigator, Flight Lieutenant Hoppy Hopkinson, pull the wounded wing commander from the burning wreckage. Back in Britain, Davis tells a fellow officer who is aghast at the losses, "You can't kill a squadron.", referring to the squadron as an entity, not the officers who compose it.

== Cast ==
Character (novel)	Role	Character (film)	Actor
Squadron Leader Roy Grenville DSO DFC	Wing Commander	Wing Commander Roy Grant	Cliff Robertson
Lieutenant Erik Bergman	Norwegian resistance leader	Lieutenant Erik Bergman	George Chakiris
Hilde Bergman	Sister of Erik Bergman	Hilde Bergman	Maria Perschy
Air Commodore Davis		Air Vice-Marshal Davis	Harry Andrews
Wing Commander Don Barrett DFC AFC	Station Commanding Officer	Group Captain Don Barrett	Donald Houston
Flight Lieutenant Hoppy Hopkinson	Grant's Navigator	Flying Officer Hoppy Hopkinson	Angus Lennie
The Brigadier	Liaison with the Norwegian Resistance		
Squadron Leader Frank Adams	Station Intelligence Officer	Squadron Leader Frank Adams	Michael Goodliffe
Warrant Officer Gillibrand	Pilot, B Flight, Canadian	Flight Lieutenant Gillibrand, Australian	John Meillon
Jimmie Willcox	Gillibrand's Navigator		
		Squadron Leader Scott	John Bonney
Bissell		Pilot Officer Bissell	Scott Finch (as Scot Finch)
		Flying Officer Evans	John Church
Maisie	Barmaid at Black Swan Inn	Rosie	Barbara Archer
		Flight Lieutenant Nigel	Sean Kelly
		Flight Lieutenant Singh	Julian Sherrier
		Flight Lieutenant Frank	Geoffrey Frederick
		WAAF Sergeant Mary Blake / Bissell	Suzan Farmer
		Flight Lieutenant Jones	Johnny Briggs
'Teddy' Young	Flight Commander, A Flight		
Sam Milner	Flight Commander, B Flight		
		Lieutenant Maner	Peter Kriss (uncredited)
Jan Ericson	Norwegian resistance fighter	Ericson	Cavan Malone (uncredited)
Johansen	Norwegian resistance fighter	Johanson	Richard Shaw (uncredited)
		Goth	Chris Williams (uncredited)
Valerie Adams			
Kearns	Landlord of the Black Swan Inn		
		SS Interrogator	Anne Ridler (uncredited)

== Production ==
=== Development ===
Film rights to the project were bought by Walter Mirisch. The film was originally a project for director John Sturges, who initially worked on a script with Rod Serling of The Twilight Zone fame as early as 1958 and offered Jack Lord the leading role. After Sturges dropped out in favour of making The Magnificent Seven, Walter Mirisch put the project on the backburner.

The original drafts of the script were penned by The Great Escape scriptwriter James Clavell. When Robertson expressed reservations about the script just prior to shooting, producer Walter Mirisch engaged U.S. scriptwriter Howard Koch, resident in London, to rewrite the film to placate him.

George Chakiris had signed a multi-picture contract with the Mirisch Brothers after his success in west Side Story. This was the fourth and final movie he made for them.

Walter Mirisch decided to make the film in Britain, in part so it could qualify for the Eady Plan. He asked Lewis Rachmil to oversee the production, although the producting credit went to Cecil Ford - Mirisch says the film needed a British producer to qualify for the Levy. Walter Grauman, the director, had mostly worked in television but had a background as a pilot.

=== Filming ===
Filming took place between July and August 1963.

Authentic period aircraft were used instead of models or special effects to create many of the aerial sequences. In part, this was because 633 Squadron was the first film shot in colour in Panavision widescreen format, a choice that made the use of archival film (a common expedient and cost-saving measure in previous films) unfeasible.

RAF Bovingdon substituted for the fictional RAF Sutton Craddock bomber airfield. The first two weeks of filming were to be at Bovingdon, with the last filming planned for Inverness. But two weeks at Bovingdon became four weeks, due to bad weather. John Crewdson was the main pilot, from Film Aviation Services. On Friday 9 August 1963, 37-year-old John Crewdson filmed a crash of the HT-G Mosquito.

The scenes were shot in the Scottish Highlands near Glen Coe, with most of the attack sequences filmed above Loch Morar and Loch Nevis. A helicopter was stationed at the Market Stance at Kingussie, which flew up the Spey Valley. The helicopter was from Worldwide Helicopter at Biggin Hill, with filming on Skye and at Oban.

Inverness Airport was used for filming purposes and aircraft were based there while filming in the Highlands. The distinctive outline of some islands can be seen behind some of the cockpit shots. While the spectacular aerial scenes used real aircraft, more dangerous sequences were created with models.

The Lairig Ghru pass in the Cairngorms was used for the training flight sequences and scenes with the Norwegian resistance. The film crew were on the side of Loch Morlich for filming at Lairig Ghru. A later scene was at the Ailnack gorge at Tomintoul. The final main scene was at a loch in Skye, near a 2,700ft mountain, the Cuillin.

The riverbank where Robertson's character romances Maria Perschy was Hurley Lock on the River Thames and was also used in a similar early scene in From Russia with Love.

Some scenes were filmed at Staverton Airport in Gloucestershire and the nearby Churchdown Hill could be seen in some shots. The pub in which the aircrew relax was The Three Compasses in Aldenham, Hertfordshire, which still exists.

=== Aircraft ===
Walter Grauman, the director, who had been a North American B-25 Mitchell bomber pilot during the war, sourced aircraft for the movie, creating the so-called "Mirisch Air Force" or M.A.F. During filming, technical advisor Hamish Mahaddie, who had acquired the aircraft for the film, told Walter Mirisch, the film's producer, that he "commanded the 14th largest air force in the world".

The film features eight De Havilland Mosquitos. The Royal Air Force had retired the type in 1963, but civilian operators still leased Mosquito TT Mk 35s to the RAF for target-towing. Scouring RAF airfields at Exeter, South Devon, Henlow, Shawbury and the Central Flying School at Little Rissington provided ten period-appropriate aircraft along with vehicles and equipment from the war.

Of the eight Mosquitos used, five were airworthy and three could be taxied on runways or used as set dressing. The airworthy TT 35 Mosquitos were converted to resemble a fighter-bomber variant (FB Mk VI) with their clear nosecones and side windows painted over and dummy machine gun barrels fitted. One airworthy Mosquito was a T3 with a solid nose, which only required the fitting of dummy gun barrels. It lacked the two-stage Merlin engines, V-shaped windscreen and bulged bomb bay of the TT 35s. At least one surplus Mosquito was destroyed in a simulated crash scene.

The Mosquitos used in the film were:

- RS709 – flown in the film (now on display at the National Museum of the United States Air Force at Wright-Patterson AFB in Dayton, Ohio)
- RS712 – flown (now owned by Kermit Weeks, on display at the EAA AirVenture Museum, Oshkosh, Wisconsin)
- RS715 – cockpit section only
- RS718 – written off in simulated crash sequence.
- TA639 – flown (now on show at the RAF Museum Cosford, Shropshire)
- TA719 – flown (now on show at the Imperial War Museum, Duxford)
- TJ118 – cockpit section only
- TV959 – at RAF Bovingdon Airfield, but not flown (now at the Flying Heritage & Combat Armor Museum, Everett, Washington)
- TW117 – flown (now on show at the Norwegian Aviation Museum, Bodø, Norway)

The three Mosquitos most used for filming were from Skyfame Ltd at Staverton Airport Gloucestershire, with pilot 35 year old David Ogilvy (1928- July 2023).

No German aircraft of the right type were available; consequently Nord Pingouin aircraft (French licence-built variants of the Messerschmitt Bf 108 Taifun) were used to represent the Messerschmitt Bf 109. At the beginning of the film, Lieutenant Erik Bergman's original escape from Norway is in a Miles Messenger.

The primary camera aircraft, a North American B-25 Mitchell set up as a camera ship by Greg Board and flown by him, also appears in the film, dropping Bergman back into Norway. The same aircraft also appeared in The War Lover).

=== Special effects ===
Although the film made extensive use of real flying aircraft, special effects were needed to create the final attack scenes. Oscar winning special effects technician Tom Howard used miniatures, front and rear projection and matte paintings to make the sequences work.

Cliff Robertson enjoyed working on the film and stated that the atmosphere on set was very good, but was unhappy with the ambiguous ending. He noted that the movie was shot on a very tight schedule and budget. He regretted not being allowed to pilot a Mosquito, which he was forbidden to do for insurance reasons.

== Differences from the book ==
The film and the novel on which it was based follow the same basic plot, but many details were changed for the film. Some scenes were re-arranged in sequence and the story was heavily condensed with most of the characters' backgrounds not mentioned. The first half of the book sees the squadron equipped with Douglas Boston light bombers before converting to the Mosquito. An early coastal shipping strike sequence was omitted for the film, as was an action-packed reconnaissance mission. The film adapts only the second half of the novel.

In the novel, Squadron Leader Roy Grenville is British, but became Americanised as Wing Commander Roy Grant for the film. Robertson was cast because he was popular internationally at the time and because an American central character improved the production's access to finance and worldwide audiences. Additionally, Robertson was an experienced pilot, owned a Supermarine Spitfire, and was personally interested in making the film as an accurate portrayal of wartime flying. Although he was refused permission to fly in the film, his scenes stand out as a realistic depiction of operational flying.

At the end of the film, it is unclear whether Grant survives the mission or not. However, in the book Grenville does survive and becomes a prisoner of war. In the novel, much more time was devoted to the personal lives of the squadron's personnel than in the film.

== Historical accuracy ==
The Royal Air Force (RAF) did not form a unit called "633 Squadron" during the Second World War. However, there was a 613 Squadron, equipped with Mosquitos, and credited with an attack on a Dutch Central Population Registry building on 11 April 1944, where the Germans held their Dutch Gestapo records. Furthermore, RAF Bomber Command undertook a variety of operations against German missile production facilities similar to that of the film, including Operations Crossbow, Bellicose, and Hydra.

A multinational Allied war effort is depicted: in addition to an American central character, the film features members of the Norwegian resistance, airmen from India, New Zealand, and Australia. This reflects three historical facts: first, airmen of many nationalities joined the RAF proper; second, under the British Commonwealth Air Training Plan, airmen from Commonwealth air forces were frequently assigned to RAF units and; third, many squadrons belonging to Commonwealth air forces, or European governments-in-exile were under the operational control of the RAF during the war.

The film draws from many of the real operations of 617 Squadron, in particular their attack on the German battleship Tirpitz in a Norwegian fjord, although that squadron used four-engined Avro Lancaster heavy bombers to carry the Barnes Wallis designed, 5.35-ton Tallboy earthquake bombs, not the twin-engined de Havilland Mosquitos depicted. However, the Mosquito was used by 618 Squadron in connection with another of Barnes Wallis' "bouncing bombs", called Highball. Though Highball was never used operationally, 618 Squadron was used as a special operations unit and is, probably, the closest match to "633".

During the film, the pilots are briefed on using earthquake bombs. However, the footage of the bombs arriving at the airfield clearly show the Mark I 1,800 kg (4,000 lb) Cookie. The delivery method, construction and effect of the two types of bomb are almost totally opposite. The Earthquake bomb must be released from high altitude for it to attain the necessary speed and must have a heavy case to penetrate the ground. In the blockbuster bomb, the case is extremely light in comparison to allow maximum explosive payload to flatten buildings at or above ground level.

The single-plane raid on Gestapo headquarters to kill Bergman before he talked bore similarities to the Oslo Mosquito raid.

The original plot, however, is similar to a real RAF mission. The novel's plot did not mention the nature of the target, only that it was a highly rated objective in Norway that could not be reached by the RAF until the Mosquito became operational. There was such a target, the molybdenum mine in Knaben in southern Norway, attacked by RAF Mosquitos on 3 March, 1943. Typical of the mineral wealth that Hitler stated was worth the sacrifice of a significant portion of the Kriegsmarine, Knaben could produce four-fifths of Germany's requirements for molybdenum, an important element in the production of armour plate. The mine at Knaben was too small to hit in a night raid, and sending heavy, long-range bombers in daylight would have met with disaster. Light bombers such as the Blenheim were far too slow and did not have the necessary range. However, Knaben was within the range of the Mk.IV Mosquito, which had a maximum speed of 382 mph (615 km/h), a cruise speed of 255 mph (410 km/h), a ceiling of 35,000 ft (11,000 m), and a range of 2,180 nmi (4,040 km). Nine Mosquitoes were dispatched by 139 Squadron on 3 March 1943. All placed their bombs on target, though one failed to return. The target was out of action for some time and was later struck by 130 American B-17 bombers from the Eighth Air Force.

The "jeep" partly hidden behind a bush in one of the Scottish Highlands training sequences is a post-war Land Rover, and the "German halftrack" is an Alvis Saracen. Land Rovers are seen in backgrounds of other scenes, such as when Grant is being driven from the airfield to be given the squadron's new assignment. The towing tractor seen on the airfield in the early part of the film is a Fordson E1A Major first produced in 1952.

== Reception ==
633 Squadron had its world premiere on 4 June 1964 at the Leicester Square Theatre in the West End of London.

=== Critical ===
While critics derided the wooden acting and hackneyed plot, and the use of the miscast Mirisch Pictures contract star George Chakiris, the aerial scenes were considered spectacular and with Ron Goodwin's music remained the main attraction.

=== Box office ===
It was among the ten most popular films of the year at the British box office in 1964.

Walter Mirisch recalled that the film earned nearly its entire cost of US$1.3 million from Eady Levy receipts in the UK, making the film practically cost free when Mirisch released the film throughout the world. The great success of the film worldwide led to Mirisch making a series of UK based Oakmont Productions World War II productions shot mostly in the UK with medium budgets over $1 million, and American stars and directors. These were Attack on the Iron Coast, Submarine X-1, Hell Boats, Mosquito Squadron, The Thousand Plane Raid and The Last Escape. None were as successful as 633 Squadron

The film was re-released several times throughout the 1960s, sometimes on a double bill with other Mirisch features such as The Great Escape. An oddity of this double billing was that actor Angus Lennie played a member of the RAF in both films.

THe movie would be one of several war films starring Cliff Robertson that was more popular in Britain than North America.

The extensive footage of the Mosquito was also of considerable interest to aviation enthusiasts. 633 Squadron appears on the list of "The 100 Greatest War Films" voted by the UK public and is featured in the 2005 documentary of the same name.

== Influence ==
The film's climax shows the squadron flying through a deep fjord while being fired on by anti-aircraft guns. George Lucas stated that this sequence inspired the "trench run" sequence in Star Wars. Lucas intercut sequences into Star Wars during post-production as a guide.

633 Squadron is well known in the UK for its regular appearances on television, and became almost a part of the Christmas schedule. The film had its network premiere on British television on 17 November 1970 on BBC1. It enjoyed the twelfth largest TV audience of the year. Although erroneously considered a sequel, the film Mosquito Squadron (1969) is similar to 633 Squadron and influenced by it, even using footage from the original.

Frederick Smith wrote several sequel novels about 633 Squadron's further exploits, but these were never adapted for the screen.

== Soundtrack ==
The musical score of 633 Squadron was written by the British composer Ron Goodwin who later recalled:

633 Squadron wasn’t a very good picture. Eventually, in sheer desperation, I took the title as the basis for the music. I’d been writing things and throwing them away for a couple of weeks without getting the main theme and then I thought 633, what about a rhythm of six beats, three beats, so I did that and that really started the whole thing. Once I had decided that that gave the right sort of effect, the actual piece of the composition cane easily.

The score became very popular and well known to the public after the film's initial release. The theme was adapted for the computer games 1942 and Into the Eagle's Nest. It was used for TV advertisements for an insurance company during the early 2000s. It has also become a standard part of the repertoire of the RAF bands, most recently included in an album marking the 100th Anniversary of the RAF. The RCAF Band also played the theme for their 75th anniversary. Cozy Powell did a version of the theme on his album Octopuss in 1983.

== Home media ==
633 Squadron was released on Region 2 DVD on 5 May 2003. The movie is presented in Widescreen 2.35:1 format and Dolby Digital 2.0 sound. The original trailer is included as an extra.

== See also ==
- British films of 1964
