= Diane Holl =

British motor racing engineer

- Born: 6 May 1964 (age 62); Guildford, Surrey, England
- Education: University of South West in Plymouth
- Occupation: Director of vehicle engineering
- Years active: 1987–present
- Height: 5 ft 5 in (1.65 m)

Diane Holl (born 6 May 1964) is a British engineer who has worked in Formula One, Championship Auto Racing Teams (CART), and NASCAR. She is employed at the Hendrick Motorsports NASCAR team as director of vehicle engineering.

The only woman to graduate from a class of 65 in mechanical engineering at the University of South West in Plymouth, Holl interned at Reynard Motorsport and March Engineering before moving to the Scuderia Ferrari Formula One team to work as a chassis design engineer under the supervision of John Barnard. In 1996, she became the first woman race engineer to win a CART motor race and engineered Tony Kanaan to the 1998 Rookie of the Year. Holl was employed by McLaren from 2001 and later Michael Waltrip Racing from 2008 to 2015.

== Early life and education ==
Holl was born on 6 May 1964. Her father and brother worked as aeroplane engineers, and her mother was a nurse. Holl was raised in Guildford in the English county of Surrey. At the age of nine, Holl's father took the family to watch Formula One racing for the first time. Holl, however, found motor racing to be boring, and thought of a career in ballet. She excelled in science at school. When Holl was 16, she changed her view on motorsport and told her parents she wanted to pursue a career as a race engineer. She was told by her secondary school teachers a course in engineering was impractical because of her gender. Nevertheless, Holl enrolled at the University of South West in Plymouth in 1983. Out of a class of 65 students studying mechanical engineering, Holl was the only woman. In 1987, she graduated with honours as the top student of her class and earned the Institution of Mechanical Engineers prize.

== Early career ==
While an undergraduate, she accepted an internship with the Reynard Motorsport vehicle manufacturer that produced chassis for motor racing cars. During her first internship with Reynard, Holl worked on the company's first carbon fiber reinforced polymer Formula Three chassis. She felt confident afterwards and went to March Engineering for a second internship. Race engineer Adrian Newey asked Holl to work as a wind tunnel designer on its IndyCar aerodynamic design programme. Six months later, Newey gave her £2,500 to design and construct a wind tunnel model, which was run at the University of Southampton by March Engineering.

Reynard Motorsport owner Adrian Reynard was highly impressed by Holl's abilities and gave her a recommendation. It led to her gaining employment as a chassis design engineer with the Scuderia Ferrari Formula One team in 1987. She worked on its British-based design team and was supervised by John Barnard. After five months. Holl decided to resign from Ferrari due to its demands for better engineering though Barnard persuaded her to stay and he let her work autonomously for four months. She moved to the Benetton Formula constructor and later to Barnard's design consultant company. Holl was part of a team that designed a carbon fibre gearbox, which was used by Ferrari. She however wanted to be more involved with on-track engineering instead of working in a design office, and sought to move away from Formula One's increasingly serious and politically based reputation.

== CART, Formula One and NASCAR ==
In 1994, Holl moved to the United States to become Reynard Motorsport's lead research-and-development (R&D) engineer for its Championship Auto Racing Teams (CART) programme. She then liaised with the Walker Racing CART team and went to race meetings. In August 1995, Tasman Motorsports owner Steve Horne moved to a two-car operation, and Holl was employed as a race engineer for driver Adrián Fernández, after Horne reviewed the qualifications of ten potential candidates. During the 1996 season, she became the first female race engineer to win a CART race when Fernández finished first at the Molson Indy Toronto. She was later assigned to work with Tony Kanaan, a driver whom she had been acquainted with in Indy Lights. Under Holl, Kanaan won the Rookie of the Year accolade in 1998, and said she helped in the development of his driving ability.

After Tasman Motorsports was sold in 1998, she was promoted to the role of chief engineer in 1999 and oversaw nine employees in its development, testing and race programmes. That same year, she had her second victory as a race engineer when Kanaan finished first in the 1999 U.S. 500 Presented by Toyota. Holl was briefly the chief engineer for Richie Hearn at the Della Penna Motorsports team during the 2000 season, before moving to Chip Ganassi Racing's R&D division, where she conducted wind tunnel testing and was Nicolas Minassian's race engineer at the 2001 Indianapolis 500. Holl returned to the United Kingdom for personal reasons soon after and contacted John Barnard to enquire about a job. He asked her to telephone Adrian Newey and the McLaren Formula One team employed her as assistant engineer. She led a team of designers on its front suspension system and occasionally worked with its race and test drivers in the company's simulator.

Late in 2007, racing driver Michael Waltrip talked to Holl about whether she was interested in returning to the United States as an employee of his NASCAR team Michael Waltrip Racing (MWR) in its transition to a modern operation with a better focus on engineering. She agreed and returned to the country to raise her child and took the job of MWR's director of vehicle design. During her time at MWR, she collaborated with its competition, testing and simulation departments. Holl left MWR in November 2015 and joined Hendrick Motorsports as manager of aerodynamics that month. In August 2017, Hendrick Motorsports promoted Holl to the role of director of vehicle engineering, reporting directly to Brian Whitesell, the team's vice president of operations. She led Hendrick Motorsports' vehicle engineering group to integrate the design-and-build processes put into the development and production of its racing cars.
