= Ian Clarke (flautist) =

British flautist and composer

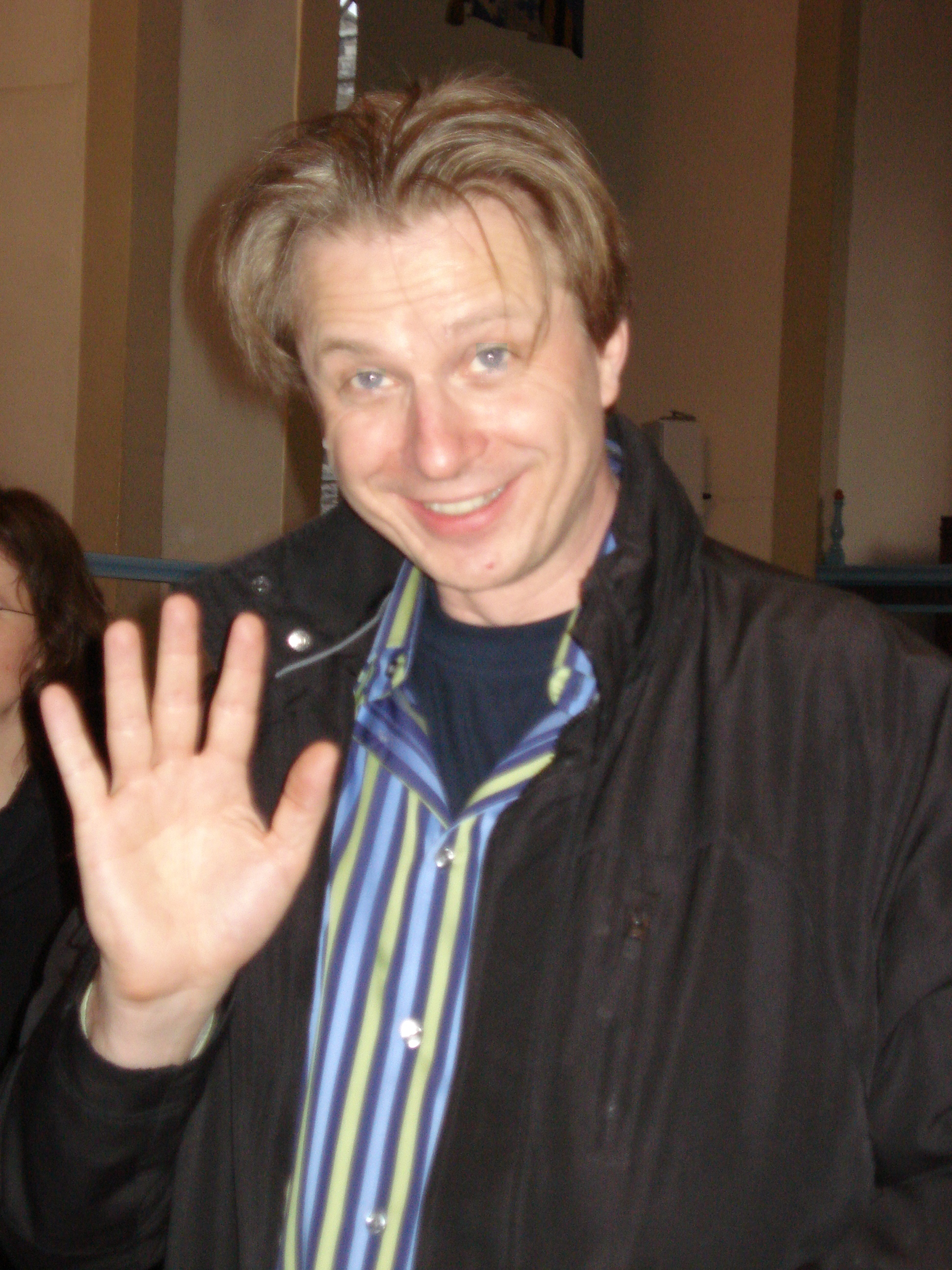
- Ian Clarke in May 2010 at Kirk of the Canongate, Edinburgh

Background information
- Born: 4 February 1964 (age 62); Broadstairs, Kent, UK
- Instrument: Flute

Ian Clarke (born 4 February 1964) is a British flautist and composer.

== Biography ==
Clarke was born in Broadstairs to a chemist father (who played in the National Youth Orchestra of Great Britain) and a mother who gave private music lessons in cello and piano. His musical studies began on recorder at age six. He started piano lessons at age eight, and developed an interest in the flute by age 10, such that he began to teach himself how to play the flute. Following early private lessons from clarinet teachers, at age 16, he began private lessons with Simon Hunt and Averil Williams at the Guildhall School of Music and Drama.

Whilst Clarke listened to classical music in his childhood, with time, he developed an increasing interest in rock music. Clarke read mathematics for a year at the London School of Economics, but then left university for a year to focus on playing the flute, where his teachers also included Kate Lukas. He also formed a rock band. He continued part-time studies at Guildhall whilst giving private lessons and performing with his rock band. He transferred to Imperial College London to complete his degree, and graduated with Honours in mathematics in 1986.

Clarke and his rock band recorded an album in 1987, Environmental Images. The band evolved and by 1992 had taken the name Diva Music, a collaboration between Clarke and Simon Painter. Diva Music has produced music for film and television.

Since 2000, Clarke has been professor of flute at the Guildhall School of Music and Drama. He has given master classes at the Royal Academy of Music, the Royal Scottish Academy, the Royal Northern College of Music, the Royal Welsh College of Music and Drama and Trinity College of Music and has regularly been invited to perform & lead workshops at numerous flute events and summer schools internationally. Along with Clare Southworth, Clarke led the Woldingham International Summer School for many years. In 2013, he took up teaching and performance at the Scottish Summer School.

Clarke made his international debut in 2001 as guest soloist at the International Flute Convention of the National Flute Association (NFA) in Dallas. He was the guest artist at the 2003 Hungarian National Flute Event and a headline artist in the 2005 NFA convention in San Diego. He has since performed as a featured guest soloist at major conventions in Italy, Brazil, Slovenia, Hungary, Netherlands and numerous times for the British Flute Society (BFS) and for the NFA.

In 2005, Clarke released his debut CD, Within, which featured twelve of his own compositions. Clarke has composed classical works for solo flute, for flute and piano and for "flute choir". His composing makes much use of extended techniques – jet whistles, timbral trills, alternative fingerings, and simultaneous singing and playing. Clarke's work came to greater public attention in the UK when flautist David Smith chose to perform Clarke's composition Zoom Tube in the woodwind finals of the 2008 BBC Young Musician of the Year competition.

== Compositions ==
=== Unaccompanied flute ===
- Zoom Tube
- The Great Train Race
- Beverley

=== Solo flute and piano ===
- Orange Dawn
- The Mad Hatter
- Sunstreams & Sunday Morning (published in one volume)
- Hypnosis
- Spiral Lament
- Touching the Ether (July 2008)
- Hatching Aliens (first performance July 2008)
- Deep Blue

=== Solo flute and backing CD ===
- T R K s
- Tuberama
- Within… (rearranged version of flute choir piece)

=== Two flutes and piano ===
- Maya

=== Three flutes and piano ===
- Curves

=== Flute choir ===
- Within… (for seven flutes) (2003)
- Walk Like This (for four flutes)
- Zig Zag Zoo (for four flutes, first performance 3 May 2009)
