= A Choice of Coward =

1964 British TV drama anthology series

DVD cover

A Choice of Coward is a British television anthology series. Noël Coward served as host, introducing productions of his plays, Blithe Spirit, Design for Living, The Vortex, and Present Laughter.

The series was part of the Itelevision play of the Week anthology series that ran from 1955 to 1967.

Produced by Granada Television, it premiered in August 1964 and ran one season.
