= Peter Kerry =

British writer

Peter Kerry (born 1964 Romford, Essex) is a British writer of radio and television drama.

He is probably best known for his work on the ITV soap opera Emmerdale. He co-created the children's comedy series Big Meg, Little Meg for CITV in 1999.

For radio he has written scripts for the BBC Radio 4 long-running series The Archers, and has dramatised two E. Nesbit novels (The Magic City and The Story of the Treasure Seekers), as well as Terry Pratchett's The Amazing Maurice and his Educated Rodents and the comic Don Camillo stories of Giovannino Guareschi.

He lives in Cheshire.
