= The Valiant Varneys =

British TV comedy series (1964–1965)

- Publicity shot for the series. Reg Varney with cast member Audrey Nicholson.
- Written by: David Cumming
- Directed by: Peter Whitmore
- Starring: Reg Varney
- Country of origin: United Kingdom
- Original language: English
- No. of series: 2
- No. of episodes: 15

Production
- Running time: 30 minutes
- Production company: BBC Television

Original release
- Release: 9 July 1964 – 7 May 1965

The Valiant Varneys is a British television children's comedy series produced by the BBC. It ran weekly for two seasons 1964–1965, with 13 episodes in total.

The show was broadcast from the BBC Television Theatre in front of a live audience.

The TV archive organisation Kaleidoscope lists all episodes as lost.

== Synopsis ==
In each episode Reg Varney assumed the guise of one his fictional ancestors in a comic exploit, such as "The Incredible Adventures of Sherlock Varney" or "The Incredible Adventures of Dr Henry Varney and Mr Hyde".

A comic strip titled "The Valiant Varneys" was printed in Buster 17 July 1965 – 12 February 1966.

== Cast ==
Each self-contained story featured a different supporting cast, with several notable actors appearing including Roger Delgado, Jerry Desmonde, Patricia Hayes, Arthur Hewlett, Cherie Lunghi, Bill Shine.
