= Rachel Cooke =

British journalist and writer (1969–2025)

- Born: Rachel Emma Cooke; 4 July 1969; Sheffield, England
- Died: 14 November 2025 (aged 56)
- Education: Oxford University
- Occupations: Journalist; writer
- Spouse: Anthony Quinn
- Writing career
- Notable work: Her Brilliant Career: Ten Extraordinary Women of the Fifties (2013)
- Notable awards: Interviewer of the Year, British Press Awards

Rachel Emma Cooke (4 July 1969 – 14 November 2025) was a British journalist and writer. She primarily wrote for The Guardian and The Observer. In 2013, she released her first book, Her Brilliant Career: Ten Extraordinary Women of the Fifties.

== Early life ==
Rachel Emma Cooke was born on 4 July 1969 in Sheffield, England, and was the daughter of a Sheffield University lecturer in botany, Roderic Cooke, and a biology teacher, Elizabeth, née Goodson.

She went to school in Jaffa, Israel, until she was 11 years old, before returning to Sheffield, where she attended Tapton School, and then Sheffield High School, then studied English at Keble College, Oxford, where she edited the student newspaper Cherwell.

== Career ==
Cooke began her career as a reporter for The Sunday Times. She also wrote for the New Statesman, where she was a television critic, and was a writer for The Observer newspaper. In the "Lost Booker Prize" for 1970, announced in March 2010, Cooke was one of the three judges. From 2010 on, Cooke reviewed graphic novels for The Guardian's "Graphic novel of the month".

Cooke's first book, Her Brilliant Career: Ten Extraordinary Women of the Fifties, was published in autumn 2013, Katharine Whitehorn wrote in The Observer that "this excellent book should go far towards setting the record straight" about women's increasing experience of having professional careers rather than being confined to a life as a housewife as accounts of the 1950s commonly assume. Amanda Craig wrote in The Independent that Cooke's "writing does not delve deep but is eloquent, concise, fair-minded, witty and elegant."

Cooke's last book, The Virago Book of Friendship, was published in 2025, and is an anthology exploring the history of female friendships. The paperback release in 2026 was featured as The Observer's paperback of the week and was reviewed by Chris Power.

== Personal life and death ==
Cooke was married to the film critic and novelist Anthony Quinn, and lived in Islington, London.

Cooke died from ovarian cancer on 14 November 2025, at the age of 56.

== Awards ==
In 2006, Cooke was named Interviewer of the Year at the British Press Awards and Feature Writer of the Year at the What the Papers Say Awards. In 2010, she was named Writer of the Year at the PPA Awards for her interviews in Esquire.

== Bibliography ==
- Cooke, Rachel (2014). Her Brilliant Career: Ten Extraordinary Women of the Fifties. London: Virago Press. ISBN 9781844087419.
- —. (9 November 2023). Kitchen Person: Notes on Cooking and Eating. Orion. ISBN 978-1-3996-2045-1.
- —. (4 September 2025). The Virago Book of Friendship. Little, Brown Book Group. ISBN 978-0-349-01842-3.
