= Joan Werner Laurie =

English book and magazine editor

Joan Ann Werner Laurie (17 November 1920 – 21 March 1964) was an English book and magazine editor.

== Early and private life ==
Laurie was born in Marylebone, London, the daughter of Thomas Werner Laurie, a London publisher with a reputation for publishing risqué titles. Her parents had three children before they married in 1931.

After finishing school in Switzerland, she married Paul Clifford Seyler, MC, son of the playwright Clifford Seyler, in May 1942. She joined the WRNS shortly afterwards, serving as a clerk and then as a driver. She worked in an SPCK bookshop after the war, and had a son (Nicholas Laurie Seyler, later Nicholas Werner Laurie, now Nick Laurie), in 1946. Her husband left Britain soon after their son was born and disappeared. Her father had died in 1944, and she worked for his old company as a production editor. She met journalist and broadcaster Nancy Spain in 1950, and they became lovers.

== Career ==
From 1954 until her death, she edited the woman's magazine She. The periodical dealt with a range of issue of interest to women, from menstruation, hysterectomy and abortion to recipes and carpentry. Joan and Nancy lived openly together with their sons, and later the couple provided a home to Windmill Theatre owner and rally driver Sheila van Damm. Among her other achievements, she was herself a competent rally driver and navigator.

She was learning to fly when she died, with Nancy Spain and four others, when the Piper Apache aeroplane crashed near Aintree racecourse on the way to the 1964 Grand National. The Civil Aviation Authority Accident Report ended with the words, "Passenger interference cannot be ruled out". She was cremated with Spain at Golders Green Crematorium, London. The relationship between Werner Laurie and Spain is described in Rose Collis' biography of Nancy Spain, published in 1997.
