= She (magazine) =

Defunct British women monthly magazine

- Categories: Women's magazine
- Frequency: Monthly
- Publisher: Hearst Magazines UK
- Founded: 1955
- Final issue: September 2011
- Country: United Kingdom
- Language: English

She was a British women's monthly magazine that ran for 56 years, from 1955 to September 2011, and was published by Hearst Magazines UK.

She had a monthly circulation of 144,583 in 2010.
