= Edwin Bollier =

Swiss businessman

Edwin Bollier and his partner, Erwin Meister, founded Mebo Telecommunications AG in Zürich, Switzerland in 1969.

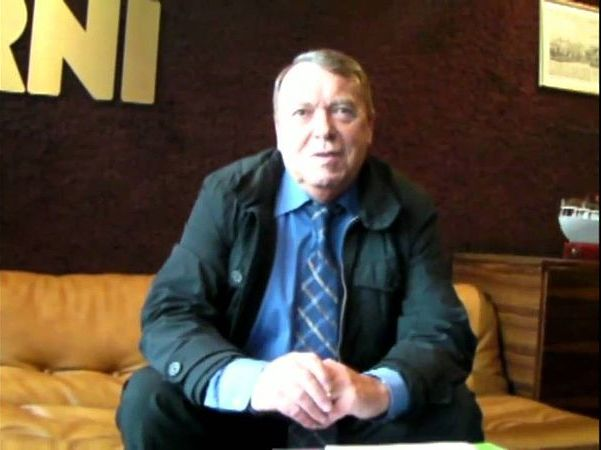
Edwin Bollier

The firm has traded in various electronic and telecommunication equipment and acted as consultants in the construction of radio stations.

== Radio Nordsee International ==
In 1969–70, the partners Meister and Bollier established a commercial offshore radio station, Radio Nordsee International (RNI), in international waters aboard the radio ship Mebo II, anchored off Scheveningen, The Netherlands. Transmissions to Northwest Europe began in January 1970. By 1971, the station had established a large listenership, especially in the Netherlands, its programs broadcast simultaneously on mediumwave (105 kW), shortwave (2 × 10 kW), and FM (1 kW). After transmissions ceased in 1974, and a lengthy legal battle with the Dutch government over its impounding of the vessel, in 1977 the Mebo II sailed for Tripoli, Libya, where it was initially leased to the Libyan government for use as a radio station; then later sunk during military target practice in the Gulf of Sidra. The deal marked the beginning of a long business relationship with Libya.

== Pan Am Flight 103 bombing ==
=== MST-13 ===
Mebo's MST-13 timing device was claimed at the Pan Am Flight 103 bombing trial in 2000 to have triggered the bomb that brought the aircraft down over Lockerbie in Scotland on 21 December 1988.

In the early stages of the investigation into the bombing of Pan Am Flight 103, the Scottish police showed Bollier a photograph of what he said was a brown 8-ply timer fragment, from a prototype timer that was never supplied to Libya. While giving evidence at the Lockerbie trial at the Scottish Court at Camp Zeist in the Netherlands on 19 June 2000, Bollier was asked to identify a green 9-ply timer fragment (PT/35(b)) which the prosecution argued was from an MST-13 timer, 20 of which had been delivered to Libya. He wanted to dispute the evidence but trial Judge, Lord Sutherland, did not permit him to do so.

=== Possibility of co-conspirator charge ===
Bollier had rented office space to the Libyan convicted of bombing Pan Am Flight 103.

During Bollier's testimony, it was revealed that the prosecution had been considering charging him with the same conspiracy to murder charge as the two Libyans, Megrahi and Fhimah, faced. When the defense protested that they had not been given notice of that position, prosecuting counsel, Alan Turnbull QC, told the court:

"If we were going to libel him we would have done so, these issues have been considered. The decision not to include him as a co-conspirator is not a recognition that he has nothing to do with the matter. The extent of his involvement is yet to be developed in evidence. It may be he has involvement in what occurred, but unless the Crown is able to adduce evidence that places him in the conspiracy, it is not appropriate to libel him as a co-conspirator."

As a discouragement to the prosecution, Bollier is alleged to have let it be known before the start of the trial that if he were to be charged for the PA 103 bombing he would call some high-ranking and controversial witnesses to appear, for example: former United States President George H. W. Bush, Lieutenant Colonel Oliver North and Gerrit Pretorius, private secretary to South Africa's former foreign minister Pik Botha.

=== "$4 million offer" to Bollier ===
In October 2007 Bollier told UN-observer Dr Hans Köchler that he had been offered, but not accepted, a payment of $4 million, together with a new identity, if he agreed to confirm that the fragment of a timer allegedly found at the Pan Am Flight 103 crash site was actually part of a Mebo MST-13 timer that his firm had supplied to Libya. He had reported the incident, after returning from the US, to the Swiss Federal Police. In a subsequent BBC documentary aired in 2008 Bollier claimed that he had been offered $200 million by the Gaddafi government if he could "... get Al Megrahi out of prison".
