= Radio North Sea International =

Defunct offshore radio sation

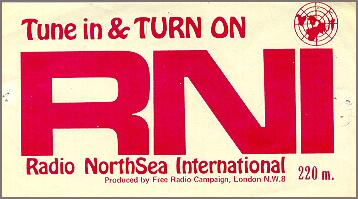
- Campaign sticker
- Offshore (North Sea); Switzerland
- Broadcast area: Europe (UK, Netherlands, Germany)
- Frequencies: MW 1367 kHz (220 m), SW 6205 kHz, FM 100 MHz
- Branding: RNI, Radio Nordsee International

Programming
- Languages: English, Dutch, German
- Format: Pop music, Top 40, Political commentary

Ownership
- Owner: Mebo Telecommunications (Edwin Bollier, Erwin Meister)

History
- First air date: 23 January 1970
- Last air date: 31 August 1974
- Former call signs: Radio Gloria, Radio Caroline International, RNI 2

Radio North Sea International (RNI; German: Radio Nordsee International; Dutch: Radio Noordzee Internationaal) was a European offshore radio station run by the Swiss firm Mebo Telecommunications, jointly owned by Swiss engineer Edwin Bollier and his business partner, Erwin Meister. (Note: . The company, registered in Switzerland, used the German name, whereas references in the UK were to Radio Northsea International. DJs on air mixed the usage. The Souvenir Book, in 1971, although in English, swaps between English and German. This article, predominately about the English service, and written in English, uses the English variant. Some publications have a tendency to split the "Northsea" into two words) RNI broadcast for less than five years in the early 1970s and, courting both disaster and success, made a modest financial profit.

== Radio Gloria ==
In 1968 Erwin Meister and Edwin Bollier were among a group intending to broadcast as Radio Gloria from the former Wonderful Radio London ship Galaxy. On 2 July 1968, the German government banned off-shore broadcasting. The Gloria project collapsed. Meister and Bollier bought their own vessel, the Bjarkoy, and set up a radio station. They renamed their ship Mebo, then Mebo I, and, after transmissions ended, Angela. Before fitting was completed, the Mebo was found to be too small for broadcasting but too big as a tender. However, she was used while the Mebo II was operating off England.

== Mebo II ==
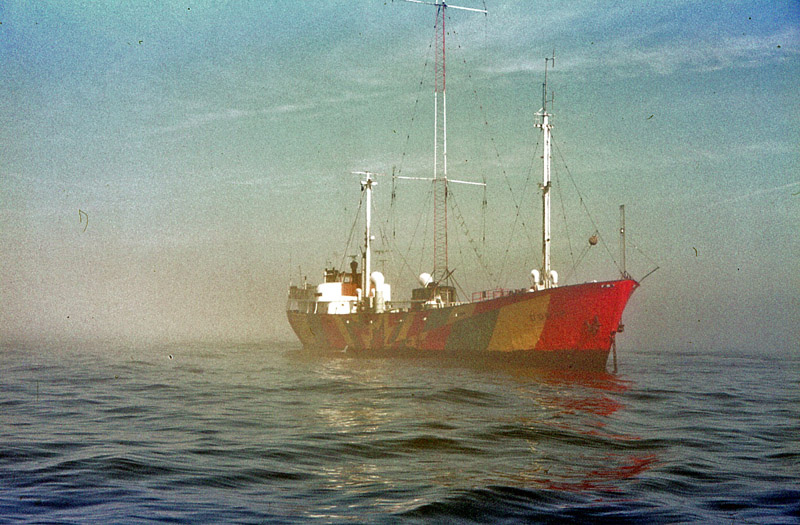
Mebo II at anchor in 1972

Originally Silvretta, and built in Slikkerveer, Netherlands in 1948, the 630-tonne vessel was 8.85 metres (29.0 ft) wide, 3.25 metres (10.7 ft) deep and 53 metres (174 ft) long. In 1969 Mebo Telecommunications bought Silvretta, fitted her as a floating radio station, and renamed her Mebo II. Since Mebo was too big to tender Mebo II off the Netherlands, RNI used a smaller vessel, Trip Tender, which Radio London had also used (when she was called Offshore 1.) The psychedelically-painted Mebo II carried a MW transmitter at 105 kilowatts (more than twice the 50 kW TXs used by Radio London and Radio Caroline), though it operated at 60 kW or less.

One of five RCA-built prototype transmitters, and the only one still in service, it rarely if ever broadcast at full power. It had the highest power of any ship-based pirate station, and the second-highest of any ship-based broadcast station (Note: . The Voice of America's MV Courier in the 1950s had the highest, with 150 kW on mediumwave.) Mebo II also had SW and FM transmitters, able simultaneously to broadcast four different streams on four different channels. The RNI FM installation transmitted with a power of 1.5 kW.

On 23 January 1970, Mebo II began test broadcasts from the Dutch coast, in English and German. When regular broadcasting began on 11 February 1970 it was more popular in the United Kingdom than the Netherlands or Germany. On 23 March 1970 Mebo II sailed to the East coast of England, arriving at 09:00 on 24 March 1970 and anchoring in international waters, five miles from Clacton.

== Jamming ==
The Labour government in Britain began jamming Mebo II's MW signal at 2030 hours on 15 April 1970. RNI responded with pro-Conservative political messages for the general election on 18 June 1970. On 13 May 1970, RNI responded to complaints about interference by changing its MW channel to 1230 kHz (244 metres) for testing. On 16 May 1970 this was an improved reception for the regular programs but was adjacent to the pop music service of BBC Radio One on 1214 kHz (247 metres). Jamming followed five days later, causing interference to BBC Radio as well as RNI, especially in Kent, south-east England.

== Radio Caroline International ==
On 13 June 1970, five days before election day, Radio North Sea International changed to Radio Caroline International and launched a campaign in support of the Conservative party. The name change and political campaign were supported by Radio Caroline's founder Ronan O'Rahilly. Listeners were told that their freedom to listen to the radio station of their choice was under threat and that, if the Labour party were returned to power, the station would close: their vote should therefore be Conservative, the only party that supported commercial radio. O'Rahilly headed the campaign on land, using a double-decker bus and posters depicting Harold Wilson as China's Chairman Mao.

They believed the Conservatives would end jamming. Conservative policy was to establish local land-based commercial radio in the UK. At a Fight for Free Radio rally the weekend before the election, Conservative loudspeaker-vans urged 'Vote Conservative and fight for free radio'. The Conservatives won.

== Reversion to RNI ==
Two days after the election, the station reverted to RNI. Because jamming continued, Mebo II returned to the Dutch coast on 23 July 1970.

The British government jammed Mebo II's broadcasts with tones, usually an 800 Hz heterodyne supplemented with a pulsed beep (whistle and "pip pip"). Norway's interference with RNI on 6215.0 kHz was explained thus:

This is a transmission from the Norwegian coast station Rogaland Radio operating in single side band mode, upper side band, with a carrier frequency of 6215.0 kHz. The purpose of this transmission is to clear the channel of unauthorised and out of band broadcasting, to improve reception conditions for ships wishing to communicate with coast stations on this frequency or on adjacent maritime channels.

Paul Harris's book Broadcasting from the High Seas, published in 1976, suggests the UK government suspected RNI's shortwave equipment was sending coded messages to unfriendly countries, in particular the German Democratic Republic (GDR).

Harris also claimed Edwin Bollier vowed to take revenge on the British government because he felt RNI had been singled out for jamming. Harris's theories are controversial and there has never been evidence to support them.

== Attempted hijacking ==
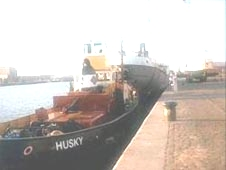
Husky at Scheveningen

On 12 August 1970, Kees Manders, a nightclub owner involved with Radio Veronica, became commercial director of RNI. But RNI's managing director, Larry Tremaine, said nothing had been agreed. Bollier and Meister had invited Manders to start a Dutch service from the Mebo II, and offered him a directorship in RNI, but withdrew when Manders leaked the story. A few weeks later, on Saturday, 29 August 1970, a salvage tug named Husky approached Mebo II at about 13:30. Accompanying the tug was a launch, the Viking, aboard which were Kees Manders with a woman and a child. In the studio, DJ Andy Archer interrupted his programme with appeals to listeners to tell RNI's offices of what appeared a threatening situation:

Seven minutes now away from two o'clock, and we have to apologise to you for interrupting our normal programme schedule with these urgent messages, but as you can probably appreciate, something rather drastic has happened. Or they're trying to make something happen which we won't stand for. We're refusing to allow anybody this radio ship, and if you've just joined us, perhaps you'd like to be put in the picture, that a tug has come alongside, along with a person by the name of Kees Manders, who apparently is a well known figure in Holland, and he is trying to take the ship away. Our Captain has only allowed him on board, and nobody else, and that will remain that way. We're not going to let anybody else on board the ship, only Mr Manders, to hear what he's got to say, but Radio North Sea International will stay broadcasting until we receive a definite order from our Head office in Zurich. So if anybody is listening in Zurich, or in London, or in our office in The Hague, in Scheveningen, perhaps they would like to do something, perhaps send a boat out, or perhaps try to make contact with us on the short-wave. . . Well, the situation is. . . none of us are sure what's happening at the moment but this certainly isn't an authorised tug. . . we have no tugs. . . the Mebo is in no need of a tug because we have perfectly good engines. . . The Captain allowed one of the men on board, but he refused to let any more on board, which is his prerogative. . . and this is the way it's going to stay until we receive details or instructions from our head office. So, once more we'd like to make a call to our head office in Zurich, or if anyone is listening in our London office, or in The Hague, perhaps you could try and get a message out to us on the short-wave link.

Spangles Muldoon reported:

It seems they're gonna spray water onto the antenna, which apart from tripping out our transmitter, would give whoever did it a very lethal shock. . .. So by all means, spray the aerial with water, if it makes you feel any better.

Andy Archer:

. . . and the banging you can hear in the background is that we are taking all security precautions, and locking up the hatches to save anybody from coming down into the studio itself. So once more we must tell you that there's a raid taking place at the moment. . . an unauthorised raid, and we're doing our best to stop everybody coming on board, so all we ask for our friends on the shore. . . to send out help to us. . .

Manders' demands were refused. He returned to the Viking, threatening to cut the anchor chain and tow the Mebo II to port. Crewmen on the Husky made to use a water cannon on the radio mast, but decided against, presumably having heard they risked electrocution. While Archer and Muldoon continued to broadcast, others armed themselves with knives and petrol bombs to repel boarders. Switchboards in London, The Hague, and Zurich received calls from listeners. Erwin Meister arrived on a launch, followed by the Eurotrip tender and other craft. Husky and Viking left, and were never seen again. Later that day van Ness, a frigate of the Royal Dutch Navy stood by. As the day ended, Larry Tremaine went on air with this statement:

Ladies and gentlemen, I am very sorry for the inconvenience today that you have had, but unfortunately we have had problems out here. And, I'm glad the disk jockeys have done their part in keeping you informed, and that's what RNI plans to do. . . I'm out here right now with the owner of Radio North Sea International, from Mebo AG in Zurich, Switzerland and we hope we don't have too many problems. At the moment, the ships have pulled off. But we are sure, as they have told us, that they are coming back. They had brought a child, and a woman, on one of their ships, to kinda deter us from doing anything to them. Although it is our intention. . . [to defend ourselves]. As the owner of the station has said to the Captain of the trip that brought us out here, only the agent from the shipping company in Holland, myself, and the owner Mr Erwin Meister has come out to the Mebo. Many people wanted to come out to help us. We told them they could not come on our ship, we are not interested in any fights, we are not interested in any deaths at sea. This station is not around to make trouble, this station is around to provide you with musical entertainment. This is the reason that we asked that only the shipping agent, Mr Erwin Meister, and myself, Larry Tremaine, to come out here to the Mebo II to see what the problem was. We have contacted our attorneys, our solicitors in Holland, and we are trying to do our utmost to do the best for you. So please stay tuned. Thank you all very much for lighting up the switchboard at the Grand Hotel. We appreciate that very much. Also thank you very much for lighting up the switchboard in Zurich. As I understand, all the lines were flooded, showing your continued support for Radio North Sea International. We are not saying that at this time, that we do not still need help, because at this time they have pulled away. But we are sure that they are coming back. Mr Manders has no right to take this ship. There has never been a contract signed with him. There are no agreements between him and Radio North Sea International. This I can assure our listeners implicitly, there is no agreement, and there is no reason for this action whatsoever. We are very sorry for all this trouble, we are very sorry to interrupt music like this. But you can understand our involved situation out here. We will protect the Mebo II to the utmost. We will not leave this ship, we are prepared for them although we do not want a fight. We do not want any deaths, or anybody hurt at all. It went so far as to tell them, when they planned to put water on the transmitter, the disk jockeys, just by thinking of the people on the ship, and not thinking of themselves, told them not to put water on the transmitter, because it would kill everybody on the tug boat. This we did not have to do, but we did it because we are a music station. We are not around to injure or endanger any lives whatsoever. So please stay tuned, if you wish to help, we want it. But meanwhile, stay with us.

== Radio silence, and return ==
RNI closed at less than 24 hours' notice at midday on 24 September 1970, in exchange for one million Dutch guilders (about £100,000) from Radio Veronica. RNI agreed to close down after concerns that Veronica, which had been broadcasting for many years and very popular in Holland, could be forced off air because of the recent problems. A final hour was hosted by Andy Archer, Alan West, and Steven Ladd. After that, the transmitters were silenced. Mebo II remained in international waters off Scheveningen in the Netherlands.

But on Friday, 29 January 1971 Mebo II restarted broadcasts, on 220 metres MW and 48 metres SW, channels the station used until forced to close in 1974. The station identified itself on 14 February 1971 thus:

This is a test transmission from Radio North Sea International broadcasting on 220 meters medium wave band, that's 1367 kilocycles, and on Channel 44, that's 100 megacycles in the FM band, and short wave at 6205 kilocycles in the European band. We're very very pleased to have you around, may I cordially suggest that you might like to call up your friends on the telephone and let them know that Radio North Sea International is back, 220 on their dial.

Regular English language programmes restarted at 14:00 on Sunday, 21 February 1971. Dutch programmes began on 6 March 1971.

== 1971 bombing ==
On Saturday, 15 May 1971, at 22:50 DJ Alan West interrupted his programme to say there had been an explosion and that the ship was on fire:

Mayday, mayday, mayday, this is Radio North Sea International from the Mebo II at exactly 52°11' latitude, 4°16' longitude, four miles from the coast of Scheveningen, Holland, one mile from the radio ship Norderney, Veronica. We are having to abandon ship very soon, the bridge and the engine room are on fire, the fire is taking control of the ship. The fire was caused by a bomb thrown on board from a small motor ship, repeat, small motor launch with an outboard motor. We don't know who it belongs to, but it certainly bombed us while it was here. This is the Mebo II on fire, we need help immediately. The Mebo II is now abandoning ship.

This can now be listened to (again) at https://www.radiocaroline.co.uk/#listen_again.html in the second half-hour of Rob Van Dijk, Friday 15 May.

At 23:40 the transmitters switched off and Mebo II was abandoned. The following morning, at 02:30, Mebo II restarted broadcasting, closing at 03:00 as normal, and normal Dutch language programmes began at 06:00 on Sunday 16 May 1971. Repairs to the Mebo II were carried out at sea, allowing the station to continue without interruption.

Spangles Muldoon stated on 16 May 1971:

Following the fire on board the radio ship Mebo II last night, three men have been arrested in Amsterdam. The men have been charged with planting a bomb on board the ship which started an intense fire which has burned out most of the after-ship's structure. The bomb exploded last night at 22:50 hours and started a fire instantly. After a few minutes it was believed the fire was under control, but suddenly, it worsened. Members of the crew and broadcasting staff attempted to put it out. A Mayday call was put out in English & Dutch and for a while, members of the crew left the ship for life-rafts. Eventually the tugboat Eurotrip came alongside. . . the captain remained on board. Within an hour of the explosion, two fire-fighting vessels were alongside and putting out the fire which was, by that time, raging throughout the whole of the stern of the ship. Other ships, tugs, lifeboats and naval vessels also joined in the fire-fighting. We would now like to thank all aboard those vessels for their efforts and also our thanks to all those on land who might have heard us last night. We shall not forget what you have done. A quick report on the condition of the ship. The whole of the after-end is a write-off, construction-wise, but we are still afloat and far from unsafe. The whole of the forward end, including the disk jockeys quarters, the studios, newsroom and transmission hall and AC generators, is intact and undamaged. The Mebo II is in no danger of sinking. We shall continue to broadcast as normal.

On 17 May 1971, 48-year-old Norbert Jurgens, the advertising manager at Radio Veronica, was arrested and questioned by Dutch Police, and the following day Veronica director Bull Verweij was also held. Verweij appeared on Netherlands television to tell how he had paid a man 12,000 guilders (approximately £1,100) to force Mebo II into territorial waters. Once in the three-mile limit, the ship would have been liable to arrest or confiscation by creditors. In September 1971, all five suspects re-appeared in court, where it became clear how the plan had been developed and implemented. According to one of the three frogmen, Jan Plat, their motivation was money and adventure. And they had heard that RNI was involved with espionage for the eastern bloc. However, Judge Mr van't Veer ruled,

These are gangster methods, totally inadmissible.

Although Meister and Bollier did not want to prosecute the offenders, all five were sentenced to one year in prison. The bombing of RNI convinced the Dutch government that it was time to outlaw the supply from the Dutch mainland of offshore radio stations on the high seas. The Marine Offences Act came into force on 1 September 1974.

== RNI 2 ==
On 30 September 1972 Radio Veronica changed its frequency from 1562 kHz (192 metres) to 557 kHz (539 metres, announced as 538), announcing that it would close at 12:30 PM and reopen on its new frequency at 1:00 PM. A moment after the station closed listeners were surprised to hear "Man of Action," RNI's signature tune, on 1562 kHz. This was followed by announcements in both English and Dutch by RNI DJ Tony Allan acknowledging Veronica's 12-year history and welcoming listeners to the new sound of "RNI 2". At 1:00 RNI 2 relayed part of Veronica's reopening broadcast. That day RNI 2 carried separate programming from the main AM and FM service on 1562 kHz and on SW but then closed without warning the following morning, never to return.

The station's management claimed that RNI 2 was set up to prove that RNI could broadcast additional frequencies in case of emergency, although the nature of that emergency was never specified. Sceptics claimed that it was just an attempt to grab some of Veronica's audience. With the launch of RNI 2, the Mebo II became only the second radio ship to broadcast two separate mediumwave stations, the first being the Olga Patricia / Laissez Faire which broadcast Swinging Radio England and Britain Radio and their successors in 1966–1967. Subsequently, the Radio Caroline ships Mi Amigo and Ross Revenge would be the only other vessels used to broadcast two mediumwave channels simultaneously.

== Final transmission ==
From June 1971 until the end of August 1974 Radio North Sea International was a regular and reliable broadcaster from international waters, four miles from the coast of the Netherlands. The main MW transmissions continued at about 50 kW on 1367 kHz, shortwave using 10 kW on 6205 kHz and VHF FM on 100 MHz. Dutch programs, which were mostly taped on land, were extended eventually to 20:00 Central European Time (CET).

Programs in English extended at the weekends from 03:00 until 06:00, when Dutch language programming began. The second 10 kW AM TX was tested on medium wave 773 kHz, and on 30 September 1972 as RNI 2, a second stream on 1562 kHz, in addition to the main stream on 1367 kHz, and intended to assure advertisers that, if need arose, Mebo II could continue transmissions on another frequency. The main English-language service closed at midnight on 30/31 August 1974, and Dutch transmissions ceased on 31 August 1974 at 20:00.

== RNI presenters (English service) ==
This is an incomplete list as many short-term and temporary presenters were also heard at various times.

- Robin Adcroft as "Robin Banks"
- Tony Allan
- "Daffy" Don Allen
- Ian Anderson
- Andy Archer
- A.J Beirens (shortwave only) Belgian
- Steve Berry (shortwave)
- Peter Chicago
- Terry Davis (later Radio Atlantis)
- Roger "Twiggy" Day
- John Denny
- Robb Eden
- Graham Gill
- Dave Gregory
- Duncan Johnson
- Martin Kayne
- Roger Kent
- Steve King
- Stephen Ladd
- Arnold Layne (same name as from the 1967 Pink Floyd single)
- Michael Lindsey
- Brian McKenzie
- Paul May
- Stevie Merike
- Carl Mitchell
- Spangles Muldoon a.k.a. Chris Cary (later Radio Luxembourg 208 & Radio Nova)
- Louise Quirk
- Dave Rogers
- Mike Ross & Sheila Ross
- Sheila Ross (married to Robin Ross)
- Crispian St John
- Mark Slate (December 1972)
- Mark Stuart
- Larry Tremaine
- Mark Wesley (later Radio Luxembourg 208)
- Alan West
- Jason Wolfe
- Terry Ingram
- Kev Tatlow

== Destination Libya ==
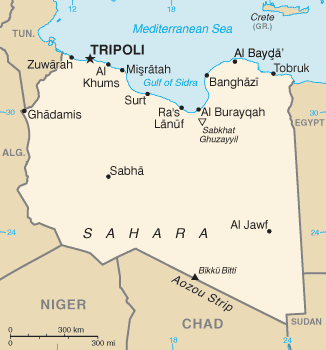
Gulf of Sidra - Libya's "territorial waters"

While the two vessels were laid up in the Netherlands, both were fully refitted. Early in 1977, Mebo I, now renamed Angela and Mebo II were sold to Libya. They sailed, each with a crew of nine, for Libya, arriving at Tripoli on 9 February 1977. Mebo II was renamed El Fatah, and Angela was renamed Almasira. El Fatah then broadcast as Radio Jamharia with programmes such as the Arab Voice, Libya International in English and the Holy Quran. This continued until 1980, when Heinz Hurter, Edwin Bollier's second wife's brother was the only Swiss national to remain aboard.

One of RNI's former DJs, Robin Banks (né Adcroft, not to be confused with DJ Robin Banks), accompanied the vessels to Libya, and stayed with them as a transmitter engineer until 1980. The Almasira and the El Fatah were said to have been used as target practice by the Libyan Navy in the 1980s, and were sunk in the Gulf of Sidra, Mediterranean Sea.
