= Mebo Telecommunications =

Swiss telecommunications company

Mebo AG (formed in 1969 and registered in Zürich on 24 March 1971) is owned by Swiss businessmen Erwin Meister and Edwin Bollier.

== Radio Nordsee International – the Mebo I and II ==
Mebo bought two vessels in 1969: Mebo I (formerly "Angela") and the 630 ton Mebo II (formerly "Silvretta"). The latter was fitted out as an offshore radio ship and broadcast as Radio Nordsee International between 1970 and 1974, off the coast of Scheveningen and, for a few months, Essex. The smaller Mebo I was used as a supply tender, and was renamed Angela (after Mrs Meister).

When the Netherlands outlawed the supply of offshore radio broadcasters, and after a legal battle with the Dutch government over the impounding of the Mebo II, Mebo leased (later, sold) the Angela and Mebo II to Libya in 1977.

Mebo II was renamed El Fatah and broadcast Libyan radio programmes from Tripoli harbour. In 1984, both El Fatah and Almasira (ex Angela) were used as target practice by the Libyan navy and airforce, and were sunk in the Gulf of Sidra.

== Lockerbie trial ==
Because a Mebo Telecommunications timing device was alleged to have been used to trigger the bomb that destroyed Pan Am Flight 103 over Lockerbie on 21 December 1988 killing 270 people, Erwin Meister and Edwin Bollier were summoned to give evidence in the second month of the Lockerbie trial.

=== Timers for Libya ===
In week 7 of the trial, Meister testified that Mebo had supplied Libya with 20 MST-13 timing devices, and identified one of the two accused (Abdelbaset al-Megrahi) as a former business contact. The defence asked Meister, under cross-examination, to explain the purpose of his visit to Syria in 1984. Meister's partner, Edwin Bollier, was questioned in week 8. Bollier said Mebo made a range of products including briefcases equipped to radio-detonate IEDs. He agreed that Mebo had sold 20 MST-13 timers to Libya in 1985, which were later tested by Libyan special forces at their base at Sabha. Bollier said: "I was present when two such timers were included in bomb cylinders". In court, Bollier was shown a number of printed circuit board fragments which he identified as coming from the Mebo MST-13 timer, but he claimed that these timer fragments appeared to have been modified.

=== Timers for East Germany ===
Joachim Wenzel, an employee of the Stasi, the former East German intelligence agency, testified behind screens in week 9. Wenzel claimed to have been Bollier's handler in the years 1982–85 and testified that Mebo had supplied the Stasi with timers.

=== Criminal complaint ===
During week 11 of the trial, Mebo lawyer Dieter Neupert filed an official criminal complaint against the Crown over what he alleged was a 'forged fragment of MST-13 timer'.

=== False testimony ===
Former Mebo employee, Ulrich Lumpert, told the Scottish Court in the Netherlands that, as an electronics engineer, he had produced all of the firm's MST-13 timers. Lumpert agreed that the fragments shown to him in court "could be" from that timer and was asked to confirm his signature on a letter concerning a technical fault with the prototype MST-13 timer.

Seven years later, on 18 July 2007, Lumpert claimed he had lied at the trial. In an affidavit before a Zurich notary, Lumpert stated that he had stolen a prototype MST-13 timer PC-board from Mebo and that he had given it on 22 June 1989, to "an official person investigating the Lockerbie case". Dr Hans Köchler, UN observer at the Lockerbie trial, was sent a copy of Lumpert's affidavit and issued a report on the matter. Dr Köchler told the Glasgow Herald:

"The Scottish authorities are now obliged to investigate this situation. Not only has Mr Lumpert admitted to stealing a sample of the timer, but to the fact he gave it to an official and then lied in court".

=== Conviction ===
Only one of the two accused Libyans, Abdelbaset al-Megrahi, was convicted of the Lockerbie bombing on 31 January 2001. Six years later, on 28 June 2007, the Scottish Criminal Cases Review Commission granted Megrahi leave for a second appeal against the conviction. Megrahi's appeal at the Court of Criminal Appeal in Edinburgh was dropped and he was released on 20 August 2009, on compassionate grounds, suffering from terminal cancer.

== See also ==
- Hans Köchler's Lockerbie trial observer mission
- Pierre Péan
