= Pan Am Flight 103 bombing investigation =

UK-US investigation of a 1988 bombing

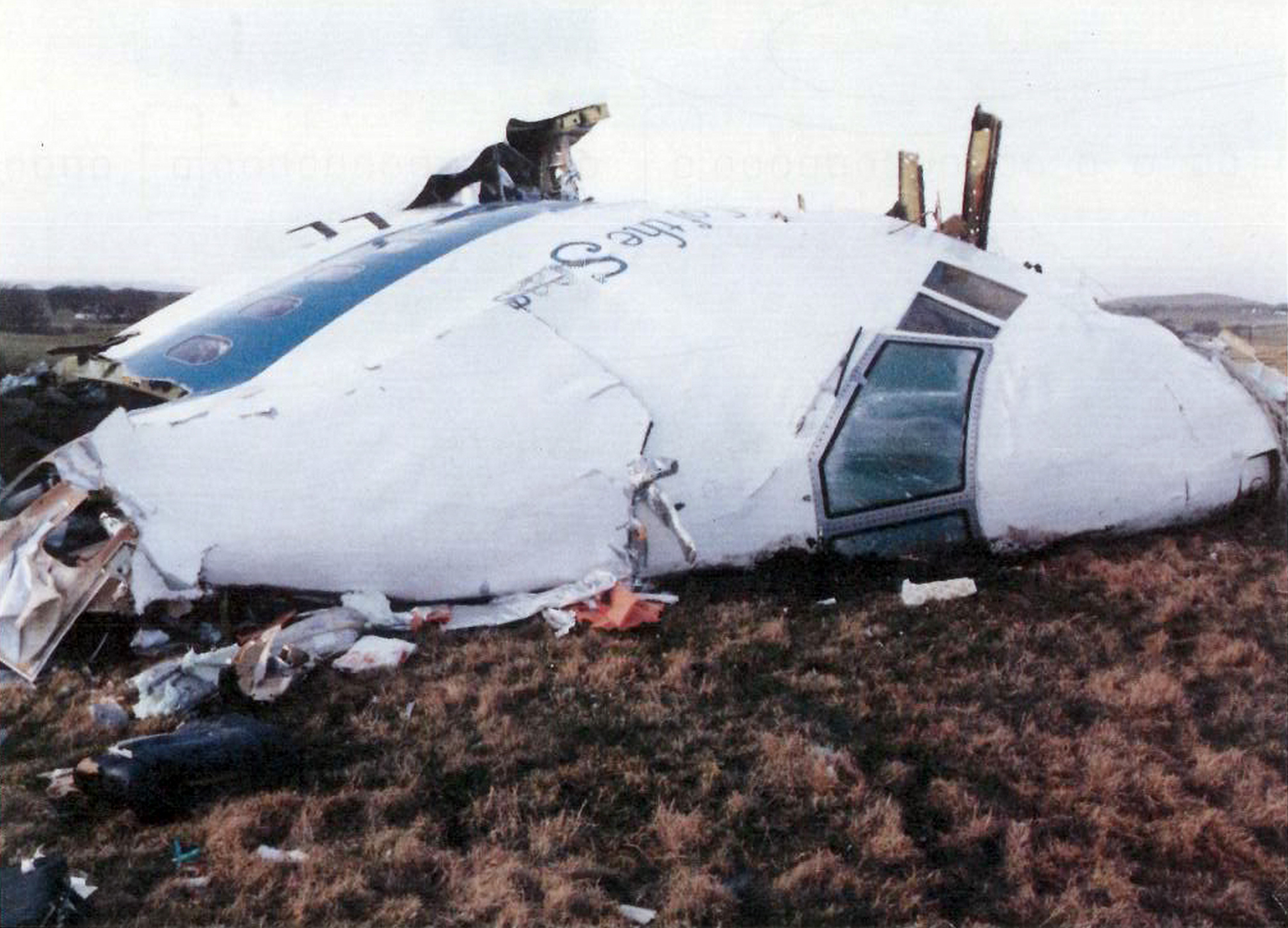
The wreckage of Pan Am Flight 103

The investigation into the bombing of Pan Am Flight 103 began after Pan Am Flight 103, en route from Frankfurt to Detroit with stopovers in London and New York City, was blown up at 19:03 on 21 December 1988 over Lockerbie in Dumfries and Galloway, Scotland. The perpetrators had intended the plane to crash into the sea, destroying any traceable evidence, but the late departure time of the aircraft meant that its explosion over land left a veritable trail of evidence. The investigation led to the prosecution, conviction, and imprisonment of Abdelbaset al-Megrahi.

== Investigators ==
In Scotland, responsibility for the investigation of sudden deaths rests with the local Procurator Fiscal (public prosecutor), who attends the scene and may direct the police in the conduct of their inquiries. The Procurator Fiscal holds a commission from the Lord Advocate, who is Scotland's chief law officer (and prior to devolution in 1999 was simultaneously a UK government minister). Responsibility for the Lockerbie investigation thus rested with Jimmy McDougall, the Procurator Fiscal in the nearby burgh of Dumfries, and with the Dumfries and Galloway Constabulary, by number of officers the smallest police force in the UK. According to a paper presented by the then Lord Advocate Colin Boyd, to a conference of law officers in 2001, the ordinary resources available to them were inadequate to deal with such an investigation.

The police effort was therefore augmented by officers from all over Scotland and the north of England, and the Procurator Fiscal was given support from the Crown Office and Procurator Fiscal Service in Edinburgh. Funding the investigation quickly became a political issue and Margaret Thatcher announced that central government, not the Scottish Office, would meet any additional costs involved.

On 27 December 2018, Wired, published an article highlighting Robert Mueller's career overseeing the US "Scotbom" investigation.

== Search for clues ==
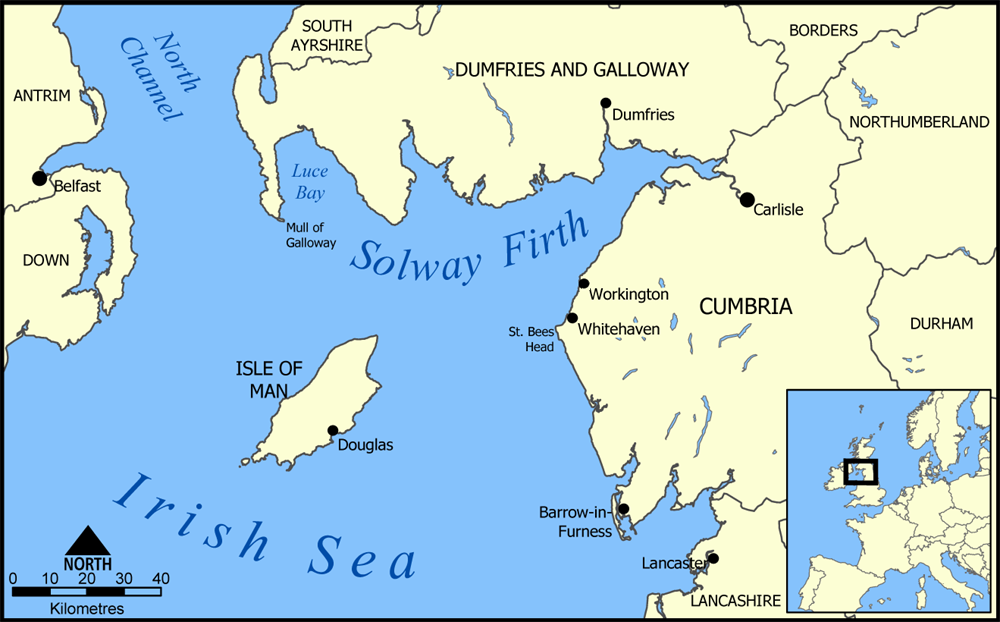
Lockerbie is 12 miles (19 km) north east of Dumfries

On 28 December 1988, just a week after the crash, the Air Accidents Investigation Branch announced that they had found traces of high explosives and that there was evidence that Pan Am 103 had been brought down by an improvised explosive device (IED). Over a thousand police officers and soldiers carried out fingertip searches of the crash site that lasted for months, retrieving 4 million pieces from the fields and forests of southern Scotland. The searchers were divided into groups of eight or ten, with the instruction: "If it isn't growing and it isn't a rock, pick it up." They were asked to look out particularly for items which might be charred and which might therefore have been close to an explosion.

British military helicopters flew over the crash site, pointing out large pieces of wreckage to the search parties. Private helicopters, equipped with thermographic cameras, were drafted in to survey the heavily wooded areas surrounding Lockerbie. Within hours of the crash, photographs of the area taken by a French satellite were delivered to the investigators. High-resolution photographs from spy satellites were also provided by the United States Department of Defense and National Aeronautics and Space Administration. Every item picked up was tagged, placed in a clear plastic bag, labelled and taken to the gymnasium of a local school, where everything was X-rayed and checked for explosive residue with a gas chromatograph, after which the information was entered into the Home Office Large Major Enquiry System.

== Reconstruction of the aircraft and luggage containers ==
Air Accident Investigation Branch investigation

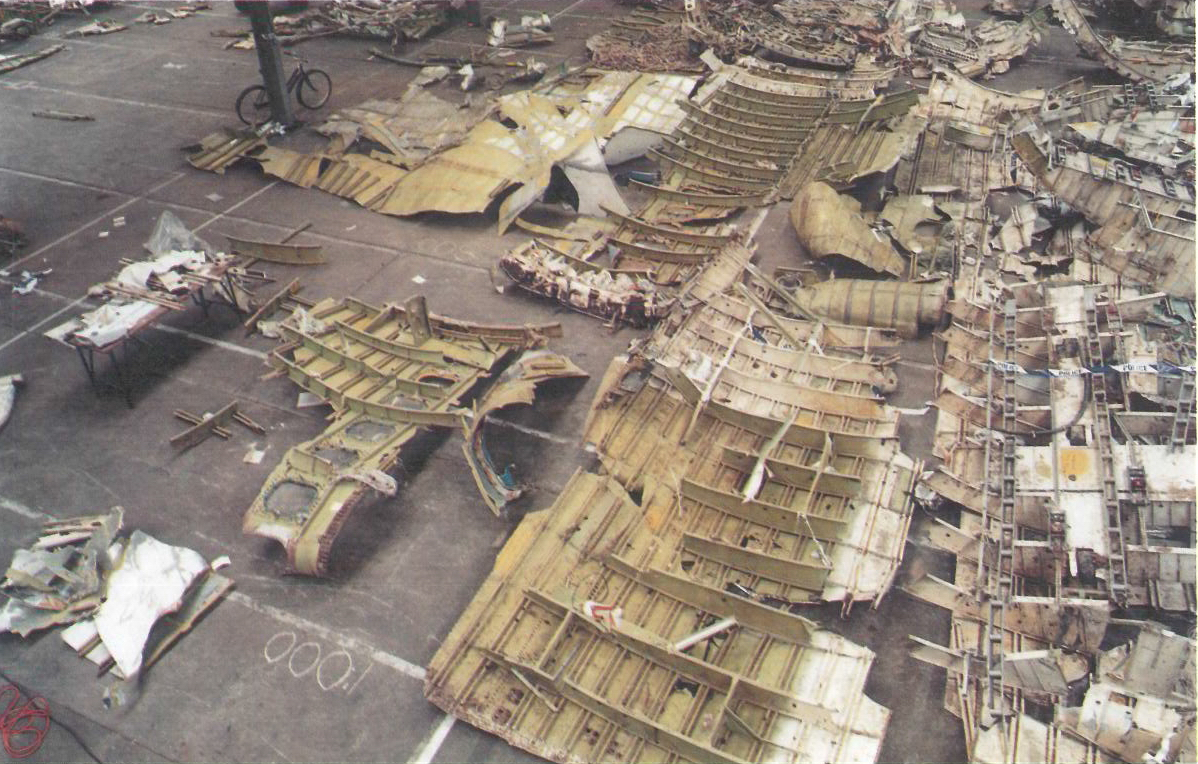
Wreckage laid out at Longtown

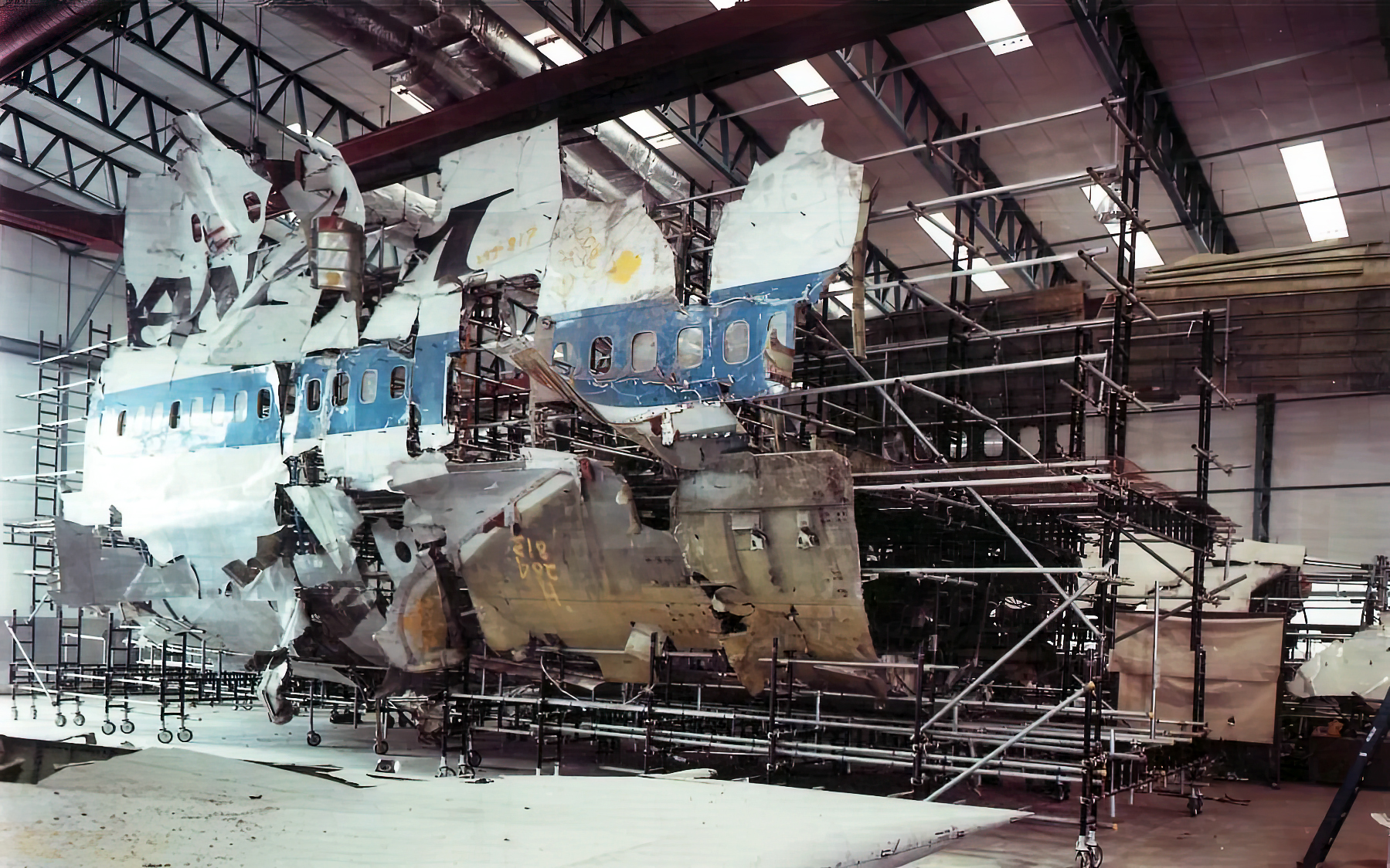
Three-dimensional reconstruction of part of the fuselage

All parts of the recovered aircraft were taken initially to a hangar at Longtown, Cumbria, where they were examined by investigators from Britain's AAIB; they were then moved to the AAIB's headquarters at Farnborough Airfield in Hampshire for the fuselage of the Boeing 747 to be partially reconstructed. Investigators found an area on the left side of the lower fuselage in the forward cargo hold, directly under the aircraft's navigation and communications systems, where a small section of about 20-inch (0.51 m) square had been completely shattered, with signs of pitting and sooting. The fuselage skin had been bent and torn back in a so-called starburst pattern—petalled outwards—a pattern that was evidence of an explosion.

The forward cargo hold had been loaded with 148-cubic-foot (4.2 m^{3}) capacity baggage containers, made either of fiberglass or aluminium, and filled with suitcases. After the explosion, most of these containers showed damage consistent with a fall from 31,000 feet (9,400 m), but two of them—metal container AVE4041 and fibre container AVN7511—showed unusual damage. From the loading plan, investigators saw that AVE4041 had been situated inboard of, and slightly above, the starburst-patterned hole in the fuselage, with AVN7511 right next to it.

The reconstruction of container AVE4041 showed blackening, pitting, and severe damage to the floor panel and other areas, indicating that what the investigators called a "high-energy event" had taken place inside it. Though the floor of the container was damaged, there was no blackening or pitting of it. From this, and the distribution of sooting and pitting elsewhere, investigators calculated that the suitcase containing the bomb had not rested on the floor, but had probably been on top of another case, though there was no proof that the explosion had occurred in a suitcase.

Using the damage to adjacent container AVN7511 to guide them, the investigators concluded that the explosion had occurred about 13 inches (330mm) from the floor of AVE4041 and about 25 inches (640mm) from the skin of the fuselage. Federal Aviation Administration (FAA) investigators then conducted a series of tests in the United States, at which Alan Feraday of Britain's Defence Evaluation and Research Agency (DERA) is understood to have been present. The tests involved using metal containers loaded with luggage, and detonating plastic explosive within Toshiba radio cassette players in garment-filled suitcases, so as to replicate the sooting and pitting pattern of AVE4041. The tests were said to have proved AAIB investigators' theory concerning both the position of the bomb and the quantity of explosive involved.

The results of these tests were used as evidence at the eventual trial to determine the origin of the bomb suitcase. John Bedford, one of Pan Am's loader-drivers at Heathrow, was able to give evidence about the precise location within PA103 of the baggage container, as well as the location of suitcases inside it, all of which helped investigators piece together how the bomb suitcase came to be there. Bedford particularly remembered handling container AVE4041, he told investigators, because he was born in 1940, and his wife in 1941.

== Samsonite suitcase, bomb, clothes, and instruction manual ==
Simulated PA 103 IED, courtesy of the Press Association

An analysis by the Federal Bureau of Investigation and DERA forensic teams of the fine carbon deposits on AVE4041 and AVN7511 indicated that a chemical explosion had occurred; that a 12-ounce (340 g) to 16-ounce (450 g) charge of plastic explosive had been used; and that the device had exploded 8 inches (200 mm) from the left side of the container.

DERA's Feraday and Dr. Thomas Hayes examined two strips of metal from AVE 4041, and found traces of pentaerythritol tetranitrate (PETN) and cyclotrimethylene trinitramine, components of Semtex-H, a high-performance plastic explosive manufactured in Pardubice, Czechoslovakia (now Czech Republic). In March 1990, Czechoslovak President Václav Havel disclosed that the former communist regime had supplied a large consignment of Semtex through a company called Omnipol to the government of Libya.

During the fingertip searches around Lockerbie, 56 fragments of a suitcase were found that showed extensive, close-range blast damage. With the help of luggage manufacturers, it was determined that the fragments had been part of a brown, hardshell, Samsonite suitcase of the 26-inch (660 mm) Silhouette 4000 range. A further 24 items of luggage, including clothing, were determined by DERA to have been within a very close range of the suitcase when it exploded, and probably inside it.

The blast fragments included parts of a radio cassette player and a small piece of circuit board. This rang alarm bells within the intelligence communities in Britain, the U.S., and West Germany, as the West German police had recovered a Semtex bomb hidden inside a Toshiba radio cassette player in an apartment in Neuss, West Germany, in October 1988, two months before PA 103 exploded. The bomb, one of five, had been in the possession of members of the Damascus–based Popular Front for the Liberation of Palestine - General Command (PFLP-GC), led by Ahmed Jibril, a former Syrian army captain. Feraday travelled to West Germany to examine this bomb, and though he found that the Lockerbie fragments did not precisely match the Toshiba model, they were similar enough for him to contact Toshiba. With the company's help, DERA discovered there were seven models in which the printed circuit board bore exactly the same details as the Lockerbie fragments.

The charred piece of cloth still showing the word 'Yorkie' that led police to Mary's House, Malta

Further examination of the clothing believed to have been in the bomb suitcase found fragments of paper (from a booklet on the Toshiba RT-SF 16 Bombeat radio cassette player) embedded into two Slalom-brand men's shirts, a blue baby's jumpsuit of the Babygro Primark brand, and a pair of tartan trousers. Fragments of plastic consistent with the material used on a Bombeat and pieces of loudspeaker mesh, were found embedded in other clothing which appeared to have been inside the bomb suitcase: a white, Abanderado-brand T-shirt; cream-coloured pyjamas; a fragment of a knitted, brown, woollen cardigan with the label "Puccini design"; a herringbone jacket; and brown herringbone material, some of which bore a label indicating it came from a pair of size-34 Yorkie-brand men's trousers.

Contained within this herringbone material were five clumps of blue and white fibres consistent with the blue Babygro material. Trapped between two pieces of Babygro fibres were the remains of a label with the words "Made in Malta". This label was the first indication of possible Libyan involvement.

DERA also found the fragments of a black nylon umbrella that showed signs of blast damage. Stuck to the canopy material were blue and white fibres, consistent with the fragments of the Babygro. Investigators were left in no doubt that these items had been wrapped around the bomb inside the Samsonite suitcase. If they could find the person who had bought the clothes, they believed, they would find the Lockerbie bomber (U.S. News & World Report, 18 November 1989).

The instruction manual for the Toshiba cassette player was found in a field 70 miles from Lockerbie by Gwendoline Horton the day after the crash. Later, during the trial, Mrs Horton could not positively identify the official exhibit as the same piece of paper she had found, claiming later that the paper she had found had been more or less intact and not in several pieces. Police at the trial said that the paper had been damaged following a series of forensic tests. Robert Ingram, a civilian search and rescue worker told the court that police had visited him some months after the crash to ask him to confirm finding items that he did not, in fact, recall recovering.

== Mary's House, Sliema, Malta ==
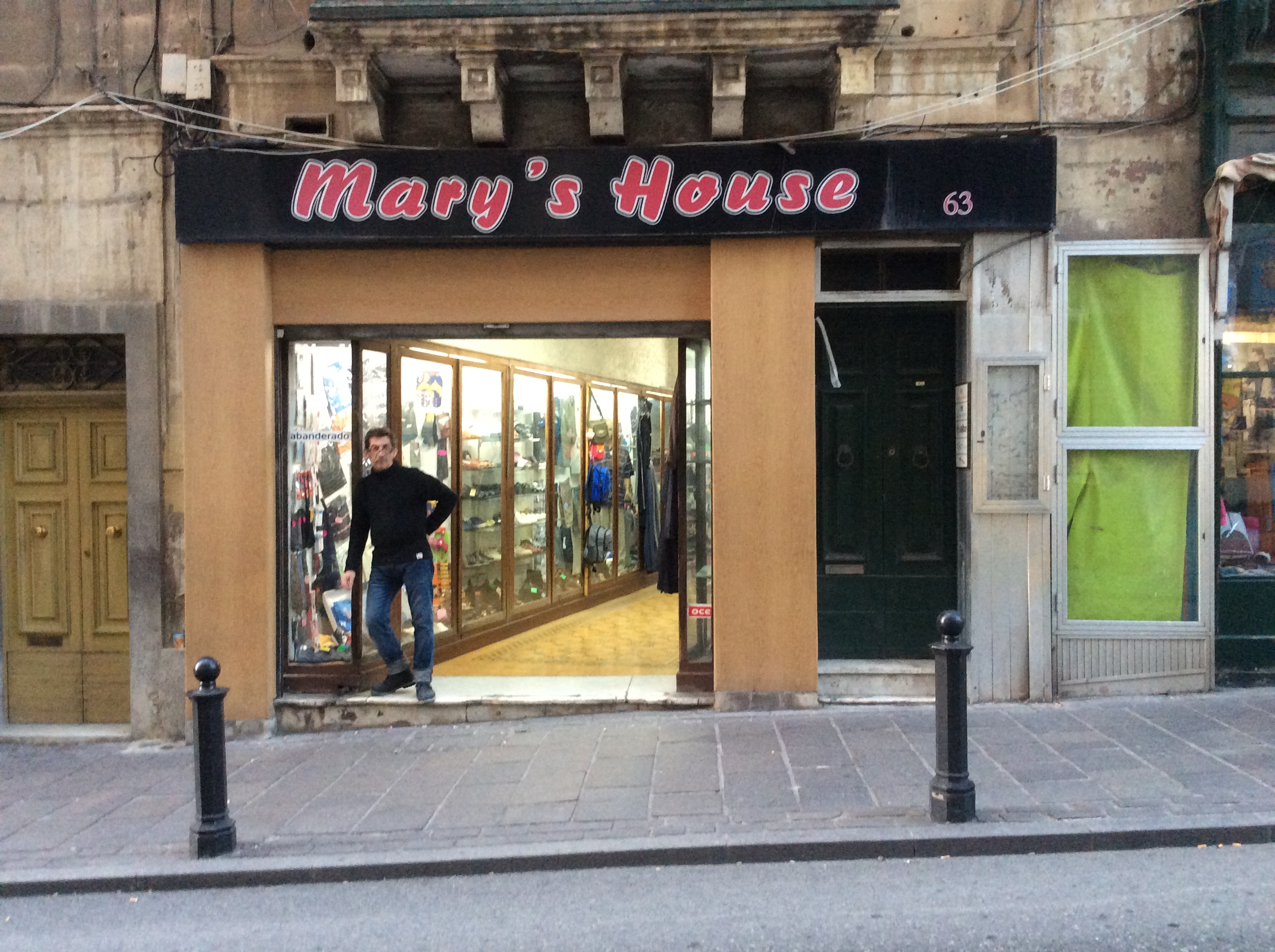
Mary's House after the reopening in 2015

As well as the Babygro carrying the label "Made in Malta", detectives discovered that Yorkie-brand trousers are manufactured in Ireland and Malta by Yorkie Clothing. In August 1989, Scottish detectives flew to Malta to speak to the owner, who directed them to Yorkie's main outlet on the island—Mary's House in Sliema, run by Tony Gauci, who became the prosecution's most important witness.

Gauci recalled that about two weeks before the bombing he had sold the Yorkie trousers to a man of Libyan appearance, who spoke a mixture of Arabic, English, and Maltese with a Libyan accent. Gauci remembered the sale well, he told the police, because the customer didn't seem to care what he was buying. He bought an old tweed jacket that Gauci had been trying to get rid of for years, a blue Babygro, a woollen cardigan, and a number of other items, all different styles and sizes. He described the man as "5 ft 10 in, muscular, and clean-shaven" (U.S. News & World Report, 18 November 1989). A Scottish police artist flew to Malta to compile a detailed sketch of the man.

Gauci had seen this customer before and, he told police, had seen him since the bombing, too, in Malta, just a few weeks previously. At this point, the Scottish police believed they might be in a position to make an arrest.

However, days later the Sunday Times of London became aware of the story, not least because of the Scottish detectives' habit of going for a walk together at lunchtime every day, conspicuous as a group in their black police officers' trousers and white shirts. Rumours spread around the island that the Lockerbie police were in Malta looking for the bomber. An American journalist who approached one of the detectives to ask whether he was from Lockerbie was told "No comment" in a broad Scottish accent, which was taken as confirmation, and the story reached David Leppard, then an investigative reporter with the Insight team of the Sunday Times, who published the story. Any chance of arresting the suspect in Malta was lost.

Before the detectives left his store that day, Gauci remembered something else. Just as the Libyan-looking customer reached the door, it had started to rain. Gauci had asked him whether he also wanted to buy an umbrella, and he did. The detectives bought an identical umbrella from Gauci, took it back to Lockerbie, and searched through the remains of the black umbrellas that were found at the crash site, until they found parts of one that seemed to match Gauci's.

The parts were sent to DERA for examination, where traces of the blue Babygro were found embedded into the umbrella's fabric, indicating that both items had been inside the Samsonite suitcase. This match confirmed to the Scots that the man Gauci had sold the clothes to was, indeed, the man they were looking for.

Doubt has since been cast on the reliability of Gauci as a witness; five years after the trial, former Lord Advocate, Lord Fraser of Carmyllie, publicly described Gauci as being "an apple short of a picnic" and "not quite the full shilling", and it was revealed in 2007 by the Scottish Criminal Cases Review Commission that Gauci was interviewed 17 times by Scottish and Maltese police during which he made a series of inconclusive statements. In addition, a legal source said that there was evidence that leading questions had been put to Gauci.

In the BBC Two The Conspiracy Files: Lockerbie shown on 31 August 2008, it was claimed that one significant reason for Megrahi's latest appeal was that Gauci, who had picked him out in a line-up, had seen a magazine photograph of him just four days before he made the identification.

== Timer fragment ==
Among the mysteries surrounding the timer fragment is how, when, and by whom, it was found. "A lover and his lass" found the fragment while strolling in the forest, according to one police source close to the case. A man found the fragment while walking his dog, according to another version. Or, in yet another story from a former investigator, police found it while combing the ground on their hands and knees. The latter became the accepted version when evidence was given at the trial. Testimony indicated that on 13 January 1989, three weeks after the bombing, two Scottish detectives engaged in a line search in woods near Lockerbie came upon a piece of charred material, later identified as the neckband of a grey Slalom-brand shirt. Because of the charring, it was sent for analysis to the DERA forensic explosives laboratory at Fort Halstead in Kent. It was not until 12 May 1989, that Dr Thomas Hayes examined the charred material. He teased out the cloth and found within it fragments of white paper, fragments of black plastic, a fragment of metal and a fragment of wire mesh—all subsequently found to be fragments of a Toshiba RT-SF 16 and its manual. Dr Hayes testified that he also found embedded a half-inch fragment of green circuit board.

The next reference to this circuit board fragment was on 15 September 1989, when Alan Feraday of DERA sent a Polaroid photograph of it to the police officer leading the investigation, Detective Chief Inspector William Williamson, asking for help in identification and with a covering note saying this was "the best that I can do in such a short time". In June 1990, Feraday and DCI Williamson were said to have visited FBI headquarters in Washington and, together with Thomas Thurman, an FBI explosives expert, identified the fragment as coming from a type of timer circuit board similar to the one in the timer that had been seized from a Libyan intelligence agent, Mohammad al-Marzouk, who had been arrested in Dakar airport, Senegal ten months before PA 103 (The Independent, 19 December 1990). Marzouk was found to be carrying 9.5 pounds (4.3 kg) of Semtex, several packets of TNT, 10 detonators, and an electronic timer—a so-called MST-13 timer—with the word Mebo printed on it. DERA's timer fragment, which was subsequently designated as PT/35(b), would eventually lead detectives via its Swiss manufacturer to Abdelbaset al-Megrahi.

Thurman's involvement in identifying the fragment later proved controversial because of a 1997 report on the FBI Laboratory, unrelated to the PA 103 investigation, written by U.S. Inspector-General Michael Bromwich, which concluded that Thurman had altered lab reports in ways that had rendered them inaccurate, and that he ought to be transferred to a position outside the FBI lab (The Wall Street Journal, 26 September 1997). Thurman was not called to testify. Potentially also damaging to the Crown's case as presented at the trial, the testimony of Thurman's UK counterpart, DERA's Alan Feraday, has now been called into question. In three separate cases where Feraday had been the expert witness, men against whom he gave evidence have had their convictions overturned. And, thirdly, Dr Thomas Hayes was castigated for his failure to test the timer fragment for explosives residue, even though at the trial he maintained that the fragment was too small to test. Defence counsel contrasted Hayes' testimony with that of two of his colleagues (Elliott and Higgs) at DERA's forensic laboratory who, as revealed in the notorious Maguire Seven trial, had tested minute samples from underneath the fingernails of the suspects for explosives residue. In another important development, a retired senior Scottish police chief added fuel to the timer fragment fire by claiming that the CIA planted this crucial piece of evidence.

The Scottish Criminal Cases Review Commission (SCCRC) considered all these issues and decided in June 2007 to refer Megrahi's case back for a fresh appeal. The second appeal will be heard by five judges at the Court of Criminal Appeal. A procedural hearing at the Appeal Court in Edinburgh took place on 11 October 2007, when prosecution and defence lawyers discussed legal issues with a panel of three judges. One of the issues concerns a number of documents from an undisclosed source country that were shown to the prosecution but were not disclosed to the defence. The documents are understood to relate to the Mebo MST-13 timer that allegedly detonated the PA103 bomb.

In January 2009, it was reported that although Megrahi's second appeal against conviction was scheduled to begin on 27 April 2009 the hearing could last as long as 12 months because of the complexity of the case and volume of material to be examined.

== Mebo ==
Investigators discovered that Mebo stood for Meister & Bollier, an electronics firm in Zürich, Switzerland. It emerged at the trial that one of the owners, Edwin Bollier, had sold twenty MST-13 timers (identical to the one found in Senegal) to Libya in 1985, in the hope of winning a contract to supply the Libyan military. The first time he supplied a batch of timers he had accompanied Libyan officials to the desert city of Sabha, and had watched as his timers were used in explosions. He told the court that he had met Megrahi on that occasion for the first time, believing him to be a major in the Libyan army and a relative of Gaddafi's. After that meeting, Bollier said that Megrahi and his co-accused, Fhimah, who he believed were good friends, had set up a travel business together under the name ABH in the Mebo offices in Zürich. Fhimah later went on to become the station manager for Libyan Arab Airlines at Luqa Airport in Malta. (Fhimah has acknowledged he worked for the airline but says he left the job three months before the bombing.)

Bollier testified at the trial that the Scottish police had originally shown him a fragment of a brown 8-ply circuit board, of a prototype timer which had never been supplied to Libya. Yet the sample he was asked to identify at the trial was a green 9-ply circuit board that Mebo had indeed supplied to Libya. Bollier wanted to pursue this discrepancy, but was told by trial Judge, Lord Sutherland, that he could not do so.

On 18 July 2007, Mebo's electronics engineer, Ulrich Lumpert, admitted he had given false evidence about the timer at the trial. In an affidavit before a Zürich notary, Lumpert stated that he had stolen a prototype MST-13 timer PC-board from Mebo and gave it without permission on 22 June 1989, to "an official person investigating the Lockerbie case". Dr Hans Köchler, UN observer at the Lockerbie trial, who was sent a copy of Lumpert's affidavit, said: "The Scottish authorities are now obliged to investigate this situation. Not only has Mr Lumpert admitted to stealing a sample of the timer, but to the fact he gave it to an official and then lied in court".

== Unaccompanied suitcase ==
In parallel to the forensic work, detectives were also tracing the origin of every piece of luggage that had been checked onto PA 103, either in London or through the Interline baggage system. Interline baggage is baggage checked onto a flight in one location and automatically routed by the airline to other locations. It is the weak link in airline security, because provided it is tagged correctly a bag not properly x-rayed by a low-risk airline in a low-risk airport may be routed without further checks through several other airports to high-risk airlines.

Frankfurt International Airport records for 21 December 1988, had been saved, only by chance, by computer programmer Bogomira Erac, who had kept a copy of the records on the spur of the moment "... in memory of the people who were on the plane". These records were to show that an unaccompanied bag had been routed from Air Malta Flight KM 180 out of Luqa Airport to Frankfurt, where it had been loaded onto Pan Am 103A, the feeder flight to London. A properly marked Air Malta baggage tag would have routed the suitcase through the interline system from Malta to Frankfurt, Frankfurt to London, and London to New York City.

The PA 103 investigators learned that the baggage for Air Malta Flight KM 180 was processed at the same time as the bags for Libyan Arab Airlines Flight 147 to Tripoli. They later discovered that Megrahi had been a passenger on this flight, having arrived in Malta two days earlier using a false passport. As he declined to take the stand during his trial, his explanation for his presence in Malta, and his reason for using a fake Identity card, was never heard.

Once alerted by Edwin Bollier of Mebo to the Megrahi–Fhimah friendship and business relationship, Scottish police obtained permission to search Fhimah's office in Malta. There they found a diary he had kept, in which he had reminded himself, on 15 December 1988, in English, to "take taggs [sic] from Air Malta."

However, Air Malta issued a statement in 1989, denying that an unaccompanied suitcase could have been carried on Flight KM 180: "39 passengers checked in 55 pieces of baggage; 55 pieces of baggage were loaded onto Flight KM 180; and, 39 passengers travelled on the flight. Air Malta has been informed that all 55 pieces of baggage have been accounted for and that every one of the 39 passengers has been identified," Air Malta declared.

== See also ==
- Pan Am Flight 103
- Pan Am Flight 103 bombing trial
- Pan Am Flight 103 conspiracy theories
- Hans Köchler's Lockerbie trial observer mission
- Libya and state-sponsored terrorism
