= Erwin Meister =

Swiss businessman

Erwin Meister is a Swiss businessman who, with his partner Edwin Bollier, formed the company Mebo Telecommunications in 1969. They bought a Norwegian freighter, renamed it Mebo II, and converted it into an offshore radio station.

== Radio North Sea ==
Mebo II operated off the coasts of the Netherlands and England from 1970 to 1974, broadcasting as Radio North Sea International (RNI). After both countries had enacted legislation outlawing the supply of offshore radio stations, Meister and Bollier leased the RNI vessel to Libya in 1977.

== Lockerbie bombing ==
Because a Mebo timing device was alleged to have been used to trigger the bomb that destroyed Pan Am Flight 103 over Lockerbie, Scotland on 21 December 1988 killing 270 people, Erwin Meister was summoned to give evidence in week 8 of the Lockerbie trial.

== See also ==
- Hans Köchler's Lockerbie trial observer mission
- Ulrich Lumpert
