= Radio Atlantis =

Pirate radio station

- Netherlands, Belgium
- Frequencies: 1187 kHz (253 m), later 773 kHz

Programming
- Languages: Dutch, English
- Format: Top 40, Flemish and Dutch music

Ownership
- Owner: Adriaan van Landschoot

History
- First air date: 15 July 1973
- Last air date: 31 August 1974

Technical information
- Power: 1 kW to 10 kW

Radio Atlantis was a Belgian-owned offshore pirate radio station, which operated in 1973 and 1974 from the coast of The Netherlands and Belgium. The station began broadcasting from the Radio Caroline ship MV Mi Amigo on 15 July 1973. The station was owned by Belgian businessman Adriaan van Landschoot who ran a chain of companies all named Carnaby:

- Carnaby boutiques trading Carnaby Jeans and Jackets
- a factory producing the Carnaby clothing
- a musical artists management bureau, "Adriaan van Landschoot Bvba"
- a recording and production studio, Carnaby Studios
- a record label, Carnaby Records.

Van Landschoot's complaints about the lack of radio advertising opportunities on Belgian public radio networks and the prohibition on establishing a commercial radio station made him decide to organize his own "Radio Veronica-like" offshore radio station aimed at promoting his products. The station broadcast taped programmes aimed at Flemish and Dutch audiences. They were recorded in a studio at Oostburg, Netherlands.

In October 1973, the station's contract with Radio Caroline was terminated, following the collapse of the mast on Mi Amigo. The station acquired its own ship, naming it after van Landschoot's wife, the MS Janine. Following three weeks of tests the station recommenced broadcasting on 30 December 1973. Both taped Flemish and mostly live English programmes were broadcast until the station was forced off the air by the Dutch Marine Offences Act. Radio Atlantis closed on the evening of 31 August 1974, the day before the act came into force. (Radio Veronica and Radio North Sea International also closed, though Radio Caroline and its new Belgian partner Radio Mi Amigo defied the act and remained on the air.)

It was originally intended that programmes would begin on 15 July 1973, using Mi Amigo's 10-kilowatt transmitter on 773 kHz (388 metres, announced as 385). In readiness for this Atlantis adopted a postal address of Postbus 385, Oostburg, which remained the station's address throughout its lifetime. This plan went awry when it was discovered that Mi Amigo's 773 kHz transmitter crystal had gone missing. The crystal, which was about the size of a matchbox, had been used as a replacement pawn for the ship's chessboard, and had apparently been thrown overboard when the chess set was replaced. Consequently, when Radio Atlantis launched it was on Mi Amigo's 50 kilowatt transmitter, on Caroline's main frequency of 1187 kHz (253 m), although all of the DJ announcements originally gave the wavelength as 385. It has been claimed that Atlantis was the only offshore radio station ever to launch on its announced date, even though it was on the wrong frequency.

== Broadcasts from Mi Amigo ==
The Caroline DJs who played the Atlantis tapes soon realised that many of the programmes overran their allotted lengths and had to be faded out early to make room for the following ones. A message was sent to the Oostburg studios reminding the Atlantis DJs that there were only 60 minutes in an hour.

In October 1973 Mi Amigo's 180 feet (55 m) lattice antenna mast (itself a replacement for the tubular steel mast that had collapsed a year earlier) fell into the sea during a storm. Caroline's engineers rigged up a temporary horizontal wire antenna but this could only achieve very limited coverage.

Meanwhile, Caroline was approached by another Belgian businessman, Sylvain Tack, who had plans for a new Flemish/Dutch station, later to be known as Radio Mi Amigo.

== Janine (Note: sources differ as to the spelling of the ship's name; alternative spellings include Janine, Janiene and Jeanine. Even the station's official QSL card gives the spelling as Jeaniane. The spelling given in this article is the one actually painted on the ship's bow.) ==
Atlantis bought Zondaxonagon, a small and poorly-equipped radio ship that had tried to broadcast Dutch programmes under the name Radio Condor. Van Landschoot renamed the ship MS Janine after his wife.

Janine was equipped with two transmitters. First a 10 kilowatt transmitter that had formerly belonged to Radio 270 and Capital Radio (the 1970 offshore pirate station of that name). By this time, however, the transmitter had been cannibalized for spare parts and had to be rebuilt. The second transmitter was a 1 kilowatt RCA transmitter that had been used ten years earlier by the Dutch offshore station Radio Noordzee from the REM-island. This became Radio Atlantis' primary transmitter. A new studio had to be built from scratch, and Atlantis commissioned a new antenna mast from a Dutch shipyard to replace the ship's existing T-aerial.

The story of what happened to the mast is a matter of dispute between Radio Atlantis and Radio Caroline. According to Atlantis, Caroline stole the mast to replace the one it had lost. According to Caroline, Atlantis had not paid for the mast so Caroline made an offer to buy it instead. Whatever the truth of the matter, the mast found its way to the MV Mi Amigo instead of the MV Janine.

Test transmissions from Janine began on Christmas Day 1973 using the 1 kilowatt transmitter and T-aerial. In an attempt to achieve better coverage of Belgium the ship was anchored close to the Belgian border, 12 miles (19 km) from Knokke. Official programming began on December 30. Two days later rival station Radio Mi Amigo went on the air with 50 kilowatts, using the mast that Atlantis had commissioned.

In addition to its regular taped Flemish and Dutch programmes by day Atlantis also broadcast an "International Service" (in practice, an all-English service) from Janine by night. This did not carry commercials but was entirely subsidised by the Flemish Service.

Ex-Caroline DJ Steve England was appointed Programme Director for the International Service. England had grown dissatisfied with Caroline's album-oriented rock format, and so he insisted that Atlantis's format should be heavily singles-oriented. Presentation was to be upbeat, fun and humorous, and punctuated by frequent American jingles, as a homage to the pirates of the previous decade.

Most of the English programmes were presented live from the ship, although there were also some taped shows. British DJ Ray Warner recorded his programmes in England, in deliberate contravention of the 1967 Marine Offences Act.

With its cobbled-together transmitter (the power of which was gradually increased to almost 3 kilowatts), inefficient antenna, repeated frequency changes and interrupted broadcasts, Atlantis never achieved very strong coverage in the United Kingdom, but nevertheless gained a small but loyal cult following.

In July 1974, the Belgian authorities threatened Atlantis' advertisers with prosecution under the 1962 Law. The wealthy Van Landschoot's response was to cancel all advertising contracts and meet the station's running costs (estimated at the equivalent of £1,500 sterling per week) out of his own pocket.

By this time it was clear that the station's days were numbered. The Dutch Government had finally drafted an anti-pirate bill which was due to come into effect on 1 September.

== Closedown ==
Atlantis' Flemish Service closed down on 25 August. For the station's final week the International Service ran 24 hours per day, finally closing down with a "Goodbye Party" from 6:00 to 7:05 PM on 31 August.

The following day the tug Onrust raised Janine's anchor and towed the ship into Vlissingen Harbour. The station had been broadcasting announcements asking fans to meet the ship at Vlissingen and say their goodbyes, and a crowd of 1,000 turned up to greet Janine's arrival.

Van Landschoot was fined 1,500,000 francs and threatened with five years' imprisonment under the 1962 Act. After appealing directly to King Baudouin, he had his sentence suspended and his fine halved.

Radio Atlantis's theme tune was Atlantis by The Shadows, although the Flemish service used a cover version by The Spoetniks.

== After Atlantis ==
In September 1974, several people with broadcasting equipment, including a 10 kilowatt transmitter, boarded the long-abandoned Gunfleet Lighthouse off the British coast and began to make structural improvements and modifications. On 19 December, the boarders and their equipment were removed by the British authorities. It is believed that this may have been an abortive attempt to relaunch Radio Atlantis. Gunfleet is owned by Trinity House, which because of its responsibility to ensure the safety of shipping does not tolerate trespassers on any of its properties.

The mast that Radio Atlantis commissioned remained standing aboard Mi Amigo until the ship sank in 1980, and thereafter remained above water as a marker of the wreck's position for several years.

Meanwhile, Radio Mi Amigo, which parted company with Radio Caroline in 1978, was relaunched from its own vessel, MV Magdalena on 1 July 1979, although this only lasted until 21 September 1979 when the MV Magdalena stranded during a Force 8 gale at the shore of Goeree. It was not until 1999 that Van Landschoot admitted the open secret that he had been involved with the relaunch of his former rival station, again aimed at the promotion of his Carnaby clothing and boutiques, and records of artists he was managing at the time: Dream Express, its offspring L.B.S., Luke and Puzzle. In 1980 he established a new record company, Mouse Music. The company specialized in dance records, which were heavily promoted via discotheques and vrije radio ("free radio": unlicensed, commercially-run FM pirate radio stations in Belgium. Such stations existed until 1986/1987 when the remaining stations, most of which had been clustered together, became legalized and licensed).

== Documentary; Reference ==
In 1982 Offshore Echo's produced a documentary LP, entitled Offshore Echos Presents: The Story of Radio Atlantis. The LP was produced by Chris Edwards and featured numerous interviews with the station's staff and DJs, as well as airchecks and jingles provided by Steve England. This was reissued on CD in 1996. Some of the information in this article is derived from this documentary.
