= Gunfleet Lighthouse =

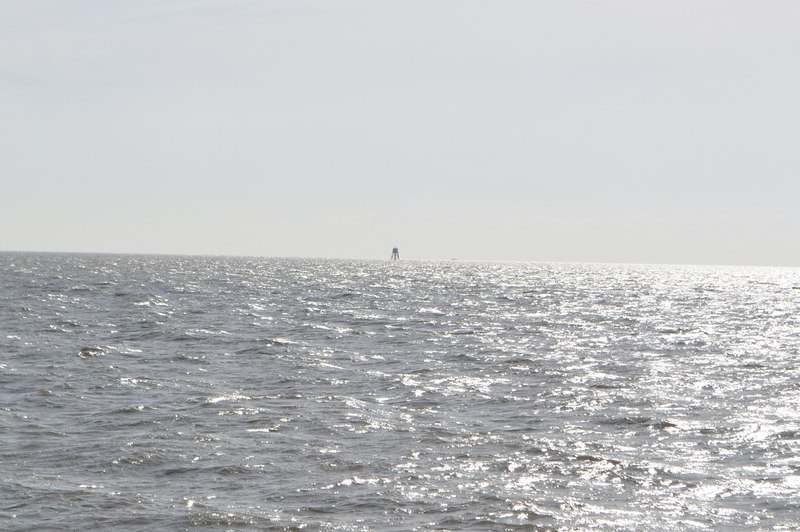
- Distant view taken in 2010
- Location: offshore of Frinton-on-Sea; Essex; England
- Coordinates: 51°46′08″N 1°20′30″E

Tower
- Constructed: 1850
- Built by: James Walker
- Construction: screw-pile tower
- Height: 72 metres (236 ft)
- Shape: hexagonal tower with keeper's quarter, balcony and lantern
- Operator: Gunfleet Sands Windfarm

Light
- First lit: 1856
- Deactivated: 1921

Gunfleet Lighthouse is a derelict screw-pile lighthouse lying in the North Sea, six miles off the coast at Frinton-on-Sea in Essex, constructed in 1850 by James Walker of Trinity House. George Henry Saunders was the contractor. Walker and Burges were the Engineers. It is 74 feet (23 m) in height and hexagonal in plan; mounted on seven piles forming a steel lattice and originally painted red. It was first lit on 1 May 1856, replacing a light vessel which had been on station there since 1850.

When in use, the lighthouse was staffed by two keepers. They were accommodated in a single-storey dwelling, immediately below the lantern, which was divided into a living room (also used as a kitchen), a bedroom and an oil room (in which the fuel for the lamps was stored). The walls and roof were of corrugated iron, with wrought iron angle plates. Additional storage space was provided in the 'inverted pyramid' beneath the dwelling, which was accessed by a ladder from the gallery.

The light flashed red once every 30 seconds; it was lit using Argand lamps and reflectors mounted on a revolving triangular frame, with a pane of red glass mounted in front of each reflector. Initially nine lamps and reflectors were used (three groups of three), but the number was later increased to fifteen (three groups of five). It also had a fog bell, which sounded once every ten seconds in bad weather; like the lamp mechanism, it was driven by clockwork.

In 1908, the light was upgraded to flash red once every fifteen seconds; thereafter, it was listed as a dioptric light (i.e. equipped with lenses rather than reflectors).

The light and fog signal continued to be listed as active into the 1940s, but by 1951, it had been decommissioned.

It remains in use as an automated weather station by the Port of London Authority, and marks the northern limit of their jurisdiction.

In 1974, an attempt was made to use the lighthouse as a base for the pirate radio station Radio Atlantis, but this was thwarted by the authorities.

== See also ==
- List of lighthouses in England
- Maplin Sands
