= Abdelbaset al-Megrahi =

Libyan convicted of the Lockerbie bombing (1952–2012)

- al-Megrahi in 1988

FBI Ten Most Wanted Fugitive
- Charges: Murder (bombing of Pan Am Flight 103); Conspiracy to murder; Breach of the Aviation Security Act 1982
- Alias: Ahmed Khalifa Abdusamad

Description
- Born: 1 April 1952; Tripoli, United Kingdom of Libya
- Died: 20 May 2012 (aged 60); Tripoli, Libya
- Cause of death: Prostate cancer
- Nationality: Libyan
- Gender: Male
- Height: 1.73 m (5 ft 8 in)
- Occupation: Libyan intelligence officer, alleged; Head of security for Libyan Arab Airlines; Director of the Centre for Strategic Studies in Tripoli, Libya
- Siblings: Zeinab (eldest sister) and others
- Spouse: Aisha (m. 1982)
- Children: 4 sons, 1 daughter

Status
- Convictions: Murder (270 counts)
- Penalty: Life imprisonment with possibility of parole after 27 years
- Status: Died following compassionate release, authorised by the Scottish Government
- Added: 23 March 1995
- Caught: 5 April 1999
- Number: 441
- Captured

Abdelbaset Ali Mohamed al-Megrahi ( Arabic: عبد الباسط محمد علي المقرحي, ʿAbdu l-Bāsiṭ Muḥammad ʿAlī al-Maqraḥī; 1 April 1952 – 20 May 2012) was a Libyan convicted of the 1988 bombing of Pan Am Flight 103 over Lockerbie, Scotland. He was head of security for Libyan Arab Airlines, director of the Centre for Strategic Studies in Tripoli, Libya, and a Libyan intelligence officer. On 31 January 2001, Megrahi was convicted, by a panel of three Scottish judges sitting in a special court at Camp Zeist in the Netherlands, of 270 counts of murder for the bombing of the flight over Scotland on 21 December 1988. He was sentenced to life imprisonment. His co-accused, Lamin Khalifah Fhimah, was found not guilty and was acquitted.

Megrahi unsuccessfully appealed his 2001 conviction. In June 2007, the Scottish Criminal Cases Review Commission granted Megrahi leave to appeal his Lockerbie bombing conviction for a second time. Megrahi abandoned his second appeal in August 2009 as an ongoing appeal would have prevented him from being moved to Libya under the Prisoner Transfer Scheme which was thought to be a possibility. He decided to drop his appeal two days before he was released on compassionate grounds by the Scottish Government on 20 August 2009. Doctors had reported on 10 August 2009 that he had terminal prostate cancer. On his return to Libya, al-Megrahi was hospitalized, then allowed to leave on 2 November 2009, taking up residence in a villa in Tripoli. He died on 20 May 2012, 33 months after his release.

== Charges, conviction and punishment ==
=== Background ===
An ethnic Magarha, Abdelbaset al-Megrahi was born in Tripoli on 1 April 1952 to a poor family. Although little is known of his early life, in 1971, he spent nine months studying in Cardiff, Wales and in the late 1970s, he made multiple visits to the United States and the United Kingdom. Later, he was the head of security for Libyan Arab Airlines (LAA), and director of the Centre for Strategic Studies in Tripoli. It was alleged by the FBI and the prosecution in the Lockerbie case that he was also an officer of the Libyan intelligence service, Mukhabarat el-Jamahiriya.

=== Indictment and arrest ===
In November 1991, Megrahi and Fhimah were indicted by the US Attorney General and the Scottish Lord Advocate for the bombing of Pan Am Flight 103. Libya refused to extradite the two accused, but held them under armed house arrest in Tripoli, offering to detain them for trial in Libya, as long as all the incriminating evidence was provided. The offer was unacceptable to the US and UK, and there was an impasse for the next three years.

On 23 March 1995, over six years after the 1988 attack, Megrahi and Fhimah were designated as United States fugitives from justice and became the 441st and 442nd additions on the FBI Ten Most Wanted Fugitives list. This list offered a US$4 million reward from the US Air Line Pilots Association, Air Transport Association, and United States Department of State, and $50,000 from the Federal Bureau of Investigation (FBI), for information leading to their arrest.

The parties eventually agreed on a compromise and a trial was held in the Netherlands under Scots law. The trial format was engineered by legal academic Professor Robert Black of the University of Edinburgh and was given political impetus by the British foreign secretary, Robin Cook.

Protracted negotiations with the Libyan leader, Colonel Muammar Gaddafi, and the imposition of UN economic sanctions against Libya brought the two accused to trial in a neutral country. Over ten years after the bombing, Megrahi and Fhimah were placed under arrest at Camp Zeist in the Netherlands on 5 April 1999. During his seven-year house arrest awaiting deportation and trial, Megrahi lived on a Libyan Arab Airlines pension and worked as a teacher.

=== Trial ===
The Scottish High Court of Justiciary at Camp Zeist was presided over by three senior judges and an additional, non-voting, judge. The two accused, Megrahi and Lamin Khalifah Fhimah, denied all charges against them. The full charges included the names of the murdered 259 passengers and crew of Pan Am Flight 103, and the eleven residents killed on the ground at Lockerbie in Scotland.

Representing Megrahi were his solicitor, Alistair Duff, and advocates William Taylor KC, David Burns KC and John Beckett. Fhimah was represented by solicitor Eddie McKechnie and advocates Richard Keen QC, Jack Davidson QC and Murdo MacLeod. Both defendants also had access to a Libyan defence lawyer, Kamel Maghur, a former foreign affairs minister in the Libyan government.

Court proceedings started on 3 May 2000. The crucial witness against Megrahi for the prosecution was Tony Gauci, a Maltese storekeeper, who testified that he had sold Megrahi the clothing later found in the remains of the suitcase bomb. At the trial, Gauci appeared uncertain about the exact date he sold the clothes in question, and was not entirely sure that it was Megrahi to whom they were sold. Nonetheless, Megrahi's appeal against conviction was rejected by the Scottish Court in the Netherlands in March 2002. Five years after the trial, former Lord Advocate, Lord Fraser of Carmyllie, publicly described Gauci as being "an apple short of a picnic" and "not quite the full shilling".

During the trial, the defence showed that Megrahi's co-defendant, Fhimah, had a watertight alibi, having been in Sweden at the time of the sabotage.

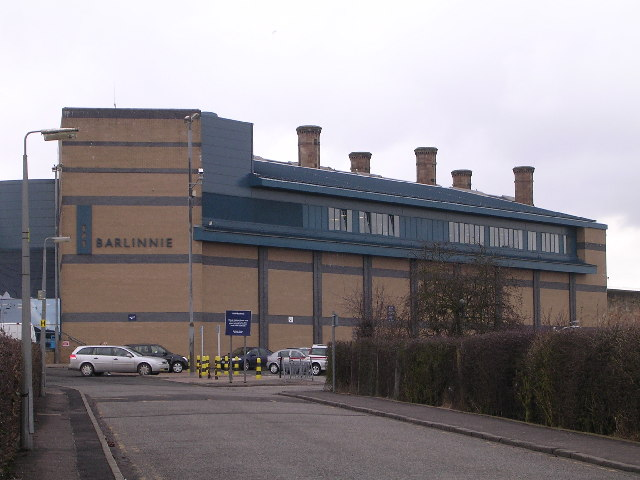
Barlinnie Prison, where Megrahi was incarcerated from 2001 to 2005

The judges announced their verdict on 31 January 2001. They said of Megrahi: "There is nothing in the evidence which leaves us with any reasonable doubt as to the guilt of the first accused, and accordingly we find him guilty of the remaining charge in the indictment as amended." Megrahi was sentenced to life imprisonment, with a recommendation that he should serve at least 20 years before being eligible for parole.

The judges unanimously found the second accused, Lamin Khalifah Fhimah, not guilty of the murder charge. Fhimah was freed and returned to his home at Souk al-Juma in Libya on 1 February 2001.

Megrahi was sent to Barlinnie Prison in Scotland to serve his sentence. In February 2005, he was transferred to HM Prison Greenock.

=== Appeals ===
Megrahi's appeal against his conviction in January 2001 was refused on 14 March 2002 by a panel of five Scottish judges at Camp Zeist in the Netherlands. According to a report by the BBC, Dr Hans Köchler, one of the UN observers at the trial, expressed serious doubts about the fairness of the proceedings and spoke of a "spectacular miscarriage of justice".

On 24 November 2003, Megrahi appeared at the High Court in Glasgow, in front of the three judges who originally sentenced him at Camp Zeist, to learn that he would have to serve at least 27 years in jail – back-dated to April 1999 when he was extradited from Libya – before he could be considered for parole. This court hearing was the result of the incorporation into Scots law of the European Convention on Human Rights in 2001, nine months after Megrahi's sentence was imposed, which required him to be told the extent of the "punishment part" of his life term. On 31 May 2004, he was granted leave to appeal against his 27-year sentence. The appeal against sentence was scheduled to be heard in Edinburgh by a panel of five Judges on 11 July 2006. However, the Scottish Court of Criminal Appeal decided to postpone the July hearing to allow consideration of whether the appeal against sentence ought to be heard at Camp Zeist rather than in Edinburgh.

=== Judicial reviews ===
On 23 September 2003, lawyers acting for Megrahi applied to the Scottish Criminal Cases Review Commission (SCCRC) for a review of the case (both sentence and conviction), arguing that there had been a miscarriage of justice. On 1 November 2006, Megrahi was reported to have dropped his demand for the new appeal to be held at Camp Zeist. In an interview with The Scotsman newspaper of 31 January 2006, retired Scottish Judge Lord MacLean – one of the three who convicted Megrahi in 2001 – said he believed the SCCRC would return the case for a further appeal against conviction:

They can't be working for two years without producing something with which to go to the court.

MacLean added that any new appeal would indicate the flexibility of Scots law, rather than a weakness:

It might even be the strength of the system – it is capable of looking at itself subsequently and determining a ground for appeal.

In January 2007, the SCCRC announced that it would issue its decision on Megrahi's case by the end of June 2007. On 9 June 2007, rumours of a possible prisoner swap deal involving Megrahi were strenuously denied by the then-prime minister, Tony Blair. Later in June, The Observer confirmed the imminence of the SCCRC ruling and reported:

Abdelbaset al-Megrahi never wavered in his denial of causing the Lockerbie disaster: now some Scottish legal experts say they believe him.

=== Second appeal ===
On 28 June 2007, the SCCRC concluded its four-year review and, having uncovered evidence that a miscarriage of justice could have occurred, the commission granted Megrahi leave to appeal against his Lockerbie bombing conviction for a second time. The second appeal to the Court of Criminal Appeal was abandoned in August 2009, as an impediment to the legal power to release him to Libya under the Prisoner Transfer Scheme then operating in the United Kingdom. Ultimately, he was not released under this scheme but rather on compassionate grounds due to his ill health. There was in any event no requirement to drop his appeal against conviction.

New information casting fresh doubts on Megrahi's conviction was examined at a procedural hearing at the Judicial Appeal Court (Court of Session building) in Edinburgh on 11 October 2007:

1. His lawyers claimed that vital documents, which emanated from the Central Intelligence Agency (CIA) and related to the Mebo timer that allegedly detonated the Lockerbie bomb, were withheld from the trial defence team.
2. Tony Gauci, chief prosecution witness at the trial, was alleged to have been paid $2 million for testifying against Megrahi.
3. Mebo's owner, Edwin Bollier, claimed that in 1991 the FBI offered him $4 million to testify that the timer fragment found near the scene of the crash was part of a Mebo MST-13 timer supplied to Libya.
4. Former employee of Mebo Ulrich Lumpert swore an affidavit in July 2007 that he had stolen a prototype MST-13 timer in 1989, and had handed it over to "a person officially investigating the Lockerbie case".

On 1 November 2007, Megrahi invited Professor Robert Black QC to visit him at Greenock Prison. After a two-hour meeting, Black stated "that not only was there a wrongful conviction, but the victim of it was an innocent man. Lawyers, and I hope others, will appreciate this distinction."

Prior to Megrahi's second appeal, another four procedural hearings took place at the High Court of Appeal in Edinburgh between December 2007 and June 2008.

In the June 2008 edition of the Scottish lawyers' magazine The Firm, the UN Observer at the Lockerbie trial, Professor Hans Köchler, referred to the 'totalitarian' nature of Megrahi's second appeal process saying it "bears the hallmarks of an 'intelligence operation'". Pointing out an error on the Foreign and Commonwealth Office's website (FCO) and accusing the British government of "delaying tactics" in relation to Megrahi's second Lockerbie appeal, UN Observer at the Lockerbie trial Dr Hans Köchler wrote to Foreign Secretary David Miliband on 21 July 2008 saying:

As international observer, appointed by the UN, at the Scottish Court in the Netherlands I am also concerned about the Public Interest Immunity (PII) certificate which has been issued by you in connection with the new Appeal of the convicted Libyan national. Withholding of evidence from the Defence was one of the reasons why the Scottish Criminal Cases Review Commission has referred Mr. Al-Megrahi's case back to the High Court of Justiciary. The Appeal cannot go ahead if the Government of the United Kingdom, through the PII certificate issued by you, denies the Defence the right (also guaranteed under the European Convention on Human Rights) to have access to a document which is in the possession of the Prosecution. How can there be equality of arms in such a situation? How can the independence of the judiciary be upheld if the executive power interferes into the appeal process in such a way?

The FCO corrected the error on its website and wrote to Köchler on 27 August 2008:

Ultimately, it will be for the Court to decide whether the material should be disclosed, not the Foreign Secretary.

On 15 October 2008, five Scottish judges decided unanimously to reject a submission by the Crown Office to the effect that the scope of Megrahi's second appeal should be limited to the specific grounds of appeal that were identified by the SCCRC in June 2007.

In January 2009, it was reported that, although Megrahi's second appeal against conviction was scheduled to begin on 27 April 2009, the hearing could last as long as 12 months because of the complexity of the case and volume of material to be examined. At a preliminary High Court hearing in Edinburgh on 20 February 2009, Megrahi's Counsel, Maggie Scott QC, was informed that a delegation from the Crown Office was due to travel to Malta to "actively seek the consent for disclosure" of sensitive documents that could determine the outcome of the second appeal.

Scottish ministers denied in April 2009 they had clandestinely agreed to the repatriation of Megrahi before the start of his second appeal on 28 April.

Kenny MacAskill announced in May 2011 that the re-elected SNP Government would seek to change Scots law to allow publication of the SCCRC report, which can presently be blocked by any party that provided evidence to the review. Nevertheless, The Herald published this report online in March 2012.

=== Call for Megrahi's release ===
The first Scottish call for the release of Megrahi was made by Moderator of the General Assembly of the Church of Scotland Iain Torrance. At the beginning of 2003, Nelson Mandela had asked for the intervention of the Western Christian churches in what he described as "a clear miscarriage of justice". This led to the production of a highly critical report of the scientific and forensic evidence presented at the original trial by the Church of Scotland's leading scientist Dr John Urquhart Cameron. As a result, in July 2003, Torrance petitioned the then prime minister Tony Blair to consider his release in view of the widespread unease in Scotland concerning the safety of the verdict.

On 14 September 2008, the Arab League Ministerial Council passed a resolution calling for the 'political hostage' Megrahi to be released from prison in Scotland. The resolution demanded that the Scottish government should hand to Megrahi's lawyers the documents which the SCCRC had identified, adding that Britain's refusal to do so represented a 'miscarriage of justice'. The Arab League also endorsed Libya's right to compensation for the damage done to its economy by UN sanctions which were in force from 1991 until 1999.

On 6 November 2008, three Criminal Appeal Court judges reserved judgment on an application by defence counsel Maggie Scott for Megrahi to be released on bail pending his second appeal against conviction which was expected to be heard in 2009. A week later, Megrahi's bail application was refused.

On the Lockerbie bombing's 20th anniversary, The Independent published an opinion piece by journalist Hugh Miles, repeating questions around Megrahi's guilt, writing in part,

Since the Crown never had much of a case against Megrahi, it was no surprise when the Scottish Criminal Cases Review Commission (SCCRC) found prima facie evidence in June 2007 that Megrahi had suffered a miscarriage of justice and recommended that he be granted a second appeal. If Megrahi didn't do it, who did? Some time ago suspicion fell on a gang headed by a convicted Palestinian terrorist named Abu Talb and a Jordanian triple agent named Marwan Abdel Razzaq Khreesat. Both were Iranian agents; Khreesat was also on the CIA payroll. Abu Talb was given lifelong immunity from prosecution in exchange for his evidence at the Lockerbie trial; Marwan Khreesat was released for lack of evidence by German police even though a barometric timer of the type used to detonate the bomb on Pan Am Flight 103 was found in his car when he was arrested.

On 14 August 2009, Megrahi withdrew his appeal. South of Scotland SNP MSP Christine Grahame said, "There are a number of vested interests who have been deeply opposed to this appeal continuing as they know it would go a considerable way towards exposing the truth behind Lockerbie... In the next days, weeks and months new information will be placed in the public domain that will make it clear that Mr Megrahi had nothing to do with the bombing of Pan Am 103." Tam Dalyell, the former Labour MP for West Lothian, has long believed Megrahi was the victim of a catastrophic miscarriage of justice, and has publicly stated that Megrahi is merely a scapegoat. Dalyell was supported by Nelson Mandela, the Church of Scotland, the Catholic Church, the law faculties of the Scottish universities, the representatives of British relatives and the UN's official observer at the trial in The Hague.

Alistair Darling, the UK Chancellor of the Exchequer from 2007 to 2010, stated that "It's true to say that the British Government wanted Megrahi out. It's probably true to say that [Scottish First Minister] Alex Salmond fancied a wander into the international stage" but denies that British government had anything to do with the release.

== Compassionate release ==
=== Family and health ===
Megrahi married Aisha in 1982. They had five children: four sons and one daughter.

On 23 September 2008, Megrahi was diagnosed with advanced prostate cancer at age 56, prompting calls for his second appeal to be heard promptly.

On 4 December 2008, Megrahi's family joined others protesting against alleged miscarriages of justice within the Scottish justice system.

An online petition to the Scottish Ministers seeking Megrahi's compassionate release was raised on 19 December 2008. It stated that he was terminally ill and would benefit physically and psychologically from compassionate release to his temporary home in Glasgow while he awaited the outcome of the appeal granted to him by the Scottish Criminal Cases Review Commission in June 2007. Since it was likely to be months before such an appeal was finally decided, the petition asked that Megrahi be allowed to spend his "very limited" remaining time in Scotland with his family and loved ones.

=== Release ===
On 4 August 2009, the Cabinet Secretary for Justice in Scotland, Kenny MacAskill, visited Greenock Prison to hear Megrahi's request for a prisoner transfer to Libya. The following week it was reported that Megrahi was likely to be released within a few days on compassionate grounds due to terminal prostate cancer, although the Scottish Government dismissed this as "complete speculation"; meanwhile, a United States official said that the U.S. had no information suggesting Megrahi would be released and that he should serve out his sentence. MacAskill faced international pressure from politicians in the United Kingdom and United States, with U.S. victims' groups and Syracuse University (which lost 35 students in the Lockerbie bombing) all urging him not to release Megrahi.

On 14 August, lawyers representing Megrahi announced that he had applied to the High Court in Edinburgh two days previously to withdraw his second appeal, and that his condition had "taken a significant turn for the worse". On 19 August 2009, it was divulged that MacAskill had reached a decision on the bomber's fate to be announced the following day. The following day, MacAskill granted his release on compassionate grounds, stating that Megrahi was in the final stages of terminal prostate cancer and was expected to die within three months. Speaking of the Scottish tradition of justice with compassion and mercy, MacAskill said he was "bound by Scottish values to release him", and allow him to die in his home country of Libya.

Immediately following the announcement, Megrahi, who had served just over 8 1/2 years of his life sentence, was escorted by Strathclyde Police to Glasgow Airport where he boarded a specially chartered aircraft to Tripoli operated by the Libyan state-owned Afriqiyah Airways. The aircraft – an Airbus A300 (registration 5A-IAY) – was the personal aircraft of Colonel Gaddafi; it was destroyed on the ground at Tripoli Airport in 2011 during fighting to overthrow the Gaddafi regime. Megrahi arrived back in time to join celebrations to mark 40 years since the country's revolution.

Megrahi landed in Libya to national celebrations and acclaim. As he left the plane, a crowd of several hundred young people were gathered at Tripoli Airport to welcome him, some waving Libyan or Scottish flags, others throwing flower petals. Some had been ushered away by Libyan officials in an attempt to play down the arrival in accordance with British and US wishes. Megrahi was accompanied by Saif al-Islam Gaddafi, son of Libyan leader Muammar Gaddafi, who had pledged in 2008 to bring al-Megrahi home, and was then joined on the aircraft steps by Lamin Khalifah Fhimah. This was the first time the pair had met since they had stood side by side during their eight-month trial at Camp Zeist, in the Netherlands 8 ½ years earlier.

After he left the aircraft, Megrahi was driven away in convoy for a long-awaited meeting with his 86-year-old mother, Hajja Fatma Ali al-Arabi, who a few days earlier had pleaded emotionally with Scottish Ministers to release her son. Hajja had not been told of her son's terminal cancer for fear that the shock would be too much for her.

Megrahi also met Libyan leader Muammar Gaddafi. The reception was shown afterwards on Libyan state television.

In an interview the following day with The Times, Megrahi vowed to present new evidence before he died which would exonerate him of any involvement in the 1988 Lockerbie bombing: "If there is justice in the UK I would be acquitted or the verdict would be quashed because it was unsafe. There was a miscarriage of justice ... my message to the British and Scottish communities is that I will put out the evidence and ask them to be the jury".

Following his release, Megrahi was taken to Tripoli Medical Center, Libya's most advanced public clinic, for cancer treatment. A video of him in the hospital showed him using an oxygen mask to breathe. On 2 September 2009, it was reported that his cancer had worsened, and that he had been transferred to the intensive care unit (ICU). Libyan Foreign Ministry spokesman Mohammed Seyala claimed that Megrahi had been moved to a special VIP wing of the hospital, was receiving full treatment from a team of doctors, and that his condition was not dangerous. Megrahi's family claimed that they had been informed that he had been taken to the ICU, but they were not allowed to visit him. The Foreign Ministry confirmed that his family were not allowed to visit him, but said that it was to ensure his safety. On 5 September, Megrahi was released from the ICU, but remained under close observation by a team of doctors.

While in hospital, Megrahi underwent chemotherapy treatment, receiving the drug docetaxel. He was discharged from hospital on 2 November, and sent to live with his family in the New Damascus district in west Tripoli, in a villa reportedly built or bought for him, shortly before his release, by the Libyan government. Under police protection, he resumed chemotherapy, making regular visits to hospital for chemotherapy sessions and other intensive treatment.

=== Medical condition ===
Following the release, doubts were expressed whether Megrahi was as ill as claimed by MacAskill in his statement to the Scottish Parliament. The guidance on compassionate release of a terminally ill prisoner under Scottish law specifies that death must be likely to occur "soon"; there is no fixed time limit but a life expectancy of three months is suggested as "appropriate". The Labour MSP for Mid Scotland and Fife and a Minister in the previous Labour administration, Dr Richard Simpson, accused the Scottish justice minister of failing to conduct sufficient checks before deciding to release Megrahi. Dr Simpson, a former member of the British Association of Urological Surgeons' prostate cancer working group who specialised in prostate disease research, expressed doubt that Megrahi would die within the next three months and claimed that he could live for eight months, going on to say that, "Kenny MacAskill released him apparently on the advice of just one doctor whose status is not clear and who is not named." He added that a second specialist opinion in palliative care should have been sought before the release. A source close to the justice secretary called Simpson's comments "tasteless" and added: "I really don't think we should be speculating on the day somebody is going to die."

On 27 August 2009, The Scotsman, quoting an anonymous Scottish Government source, reported that MacAskill ignored the advice of four specialists who were unwilling to speculate on Megrahi's anticipated lifespan.

Reviewing the case, members of Holyrood's justice committee stated that Scottish Prison Service guidelines were not followed in the decision to release Megrahi, that the medical evidence presented was flimsy, and that four cancer specialists had refused to back up the opinion of the prison doctor that Megrahi would be dead within three months. However the prison doctors and some experts brought in had said that Megrahi met the Scottish standards for release. The release of prisoners on compassionate grounds is up to the Minister of Justice and not to a committee.

Soon afterwards, Libyan media reported that Megrahi was able to talk to his mother by telephone from his hospital bed and The Times, at the beginning of November, suggested that his condition had not deteriorated significantly.

In early April 2010 it was reported that his cancer was no longer responding to treatment. The cancer consultant Karol Sikora, who had originally supported the three months prognosis (although his evidence was not allowed to contribute to the release decision as he was paid by the Libyan authorities), reported that Megrahi was bed-bound and had probably no more than four weeks to live, with his earlier apparent recovery probably due to his being with his family. The Libyan Consul General in Glasgow also reported that his condition had rapidly deteriorated. In July 2010, Dr Sikora told The Daily Telegraph, "There was always a chance he could live for 10 years, 20 years ... but that would be unusual". He also stated that "It was clear that three months was what they (the Libyan government) were aiming for" adding that "On the balance of probabilities, he felt he could sort of justify that."

In response to an attempt to have his medical condition made public from Scottish Conservatives in July 2010, First Minister Alex Salmond compared him to one of Britain's most famous prisoners, Ronald Biggs, who was outliving al-Megrahi while on compassionate release.

In a July 2010 interview with Scottish Television Dr Sikora said that his statements were misquoted extensively by dropping his qualification that 10 years' survival "would be unusual". He stated that the chances of such a long survival would be less than 1% but there was a 90% likelihood that he would be dead in a matter of weeks. UPI was still reporting the other version in August 2010.

Libyan media outlets reported Megrahi had been released from the hospital and was living at his family's villa.

On 26 July 2011, during the First Libyan Civil War, Megrahi was shown on Libyan state television, attending a pro-Gaddafi rally of members of his tribe. Megrahi appeared to be frail, and was in a wheelchair. However, in late August 2011, CNN reported that a TV crew had found Megrahi comatose and, according to his family, on his deathbed. Notwithstanding this report, in early October in an interview with Reuters from his bed, al-Megrahi protested his innocence and claimed that he had only days, weeks or months to live. On 13 April 2012, he was hospitalized. He died on 20 May 2012, aged 60.

=== Suggestions of innocence ===
On 29 August 2011, a letter written by Megrahi was discovered by The Wall Street Journal at intelligence headquarters in Tripoli, Libya. In what was a private letter to Libya's intelligence chief not previously available to the public, Megrahi wrote "I am an innocent man", a letter apparently composed while he was serving a life sentence in Scotland, and written in blue ink on ordinary paper. The letter was found in a steel four-drawer filing cabinet that had been forced open by rebels who entered the office of intelligence chief Abdullah al-Senussi.

Jim Swire, whose daughter Flora was killed in the bombing and who has been a spokesman for UK Families Flight 103, which represented British relatives, has said that he believes Megrahi is innocent. Swire is also concerned by comments attributed to the former lord advocate Lord Fraser, which appeared to doubt the credibility of the key prosecution witness, Tony Gauci. Swire said "the scandal around Megrahi is not that a sick man was released, but that he was ever convicted in the first place. All I have ever wanted is to see the people who murdered my daughter are brought to justice."

Professor Robert Black, an expert in Scots law who devised the non-jury trial that saw the Lockerbie case heard in 2000, has called Megrahi's murder conviction "the most disgraceful miscarriage of justice in Scotland for 100 years". Professor Black said he felt "a measure of personal responsibility" for persuading Libya to allow Megrahi and his co-accused, Al-Amin Khalifa Fhima, who was acquitted, to stand trial under Scots law.

I have written about this and nobody is interested. Every lawyer who has ... read the judgment says "this is nonsense". It is nonsense. It really distresses me; I won't let it go.

The non-profit religious think tank Ekklesia noted that "all of the Crown's witnesses in the 36-week trial, which took place at a specially convened Scottish Court in the Netherlands, have subsequently been discredited. In the latest revelation, a prosecution expert misled judges about key evidence, according to a classified police memo published by the Sunday Herald on 17 July [2011]", cautioning that

Dr Swire, other UK relatives of the victims, and a range of legal campaigners, including Professor Black, say that the May 2000 trial of two Libyan suspects, the other of whom was not convicted, amounts to a cover up and a serious miscarriage of justice. Their concern is that the truth has not come out, and that the guilty have not been brought to justice.

Megrahi himself, according to his cousin, used to say

If God gives me life and health I will appeal my case and prove my innocence.

=== Suggested links to oil deals ===
On 28 August 2009, The Herald published an interview conducted with Colonel Gaddafi's son, Saif al-Islam Gaddafi, in which he stated that Megrahi's release was not tied to any oil deals but was an entirely separate issue. Referring to the Prisoner Transfer Agreement (PTA), he continued, "People should not get angry because we were talking about commerce or oil. We signed an oil deal at the same time. The commerce and politics and deals were all with the PTA. This was one animal and the other was the compassionate release. They are two completely different animals."

On 30 August, an article published in the Sunday Times claimed ministers at Westminster had agreed not to specifically exclude al-Megrahi from an agreement concerning prisoner transfers in 2007 because of "overwhelming national interests". In a letter dated 19 December 2007, Secretary of State for Justice Jack Straw wrote to his Scottish counterpart, "I had previously accepted the importance of the al-Megrahi issue to Scotland and said I would try to get an exclusion for him on the face of the agreement. I have not been able to secure an explicit exclusion. The wider negotiations with the Libyans are reaching a critical stage and, in view of the overwhelming interests for the UK, I have agreed that in this instance the [PTA] should be in the standard form and not mention any individual." Straw is quoted as stating that an application under the prisoner transfer agreement was turned down. Straw denied that the release was part of any deal, while Scottish First Minister Alex Salmond reiterated that the release had been granted on compassionate grounds and not as part of any deal struck by the British Government.

On 16 July 2010, four United States senators made public their concerns over the release, stating they believed that the oil company BP pushed for his release to secure a deal with Libya. BP confirmed that it did press for a Prisoner Transfer Agreement as it was aware that a delay might have "negative consequences" for UK commercial interests. However, the firm said it was not involved in any discussions regarding Megrahi's release. A spokesman for the Scottish government insisted that they acted alone stating: "The Scottish government had no contact from BP in relation to Mr Al-Megrahi." Further hearings examining Megrahi's release, due to be held at Capitol Hill on 29 July, were postponed when the US Dept of Justice and British witnesses – and in particular from the Scottish Government – refused to attend, and were rescheduled for September the same year, before the then forthcoming senatorial elections.

=== U.S. position on release ===
While President Obama expressed surprise at the decision, stating "I think all of us here in the United States were surprised, disappointed and angry about the release", the U.S. government was aware that a release was possible. The deputy head of the U.S. embassy in London, Frank LeBaron, wrote in a letter to the Scottish first minister Alex Salmond that the U.S. believed al-Megrahi should remain in prison for his role in downing Pan Am flight 103 in 1988, and continued: "Nevertheless, if Scottish authorities come to the conclusion that Megrahi must be released from Scottish custody, the U.S. position is that conditional release on compassionate grounds would be a far preferable alternative to prisoner transfer, which we strongly oppose." This same letter stressed the importance to the United States of America of a three-months prognosis, despite it not being a legal requirement in Scotland: "any such release should only come after the results of independent and comprehensive medical exams clearly establishing that Megrahi's life expectancy is less than three months".

=== Appeals dossier released ===
On 18 September 2009, Megrahi released a 300-page dossier of evidence that challenges the prosecution case against him, and that he believed would have secured his release on appeal. The release of the evidence dossier was condemned by Lord Advocate Elish Angiolini, who said that Megrahi had abandoned his appeal before his release on compassionate grounds.

=== Wikileaks on Megrahi ===
Cable 08LONDON2673 (dated 2008-10-24) from US Embassy London reports:

MEGRAHI was first diagnosed on 23 September at Inverclyde Royal Hospital, both the FCO and the Scottish Crown office have told us; the second diagnosis was on 10 October. The two diagnoses match: he has prostate cancer that has spread to his bones, the cancer has advanced rapidly, and it is inoperable and incurable. MEGRAHI could have as long as five years to live, but the average life expectancy of someone of his age with his condition is eighteen months to two years

Cable 09TRIPOLI65 (dated 2009-01-28) from US Embassy Tripoli reports:

the case of convicted Pan Am 103 bomber Abdelbasset al-Megrahi is arguably the regime's most sensitive political subject, in part because it involves a firm timeline in the form of the ailing el-Megrahi's approaching death. Through remarks by senior officials suggesting that al-Megrahi is innocent and a steady diet of publicity about his case, the regime has limited its room for political maneuver. U.K. Embassy interlocutors here are planning for a scenario in which the U.K.-Libya Prisoner Transfer Agreement is ratified in early March and the GOL makes application shortly thereafter for al-Megrahi's transfer to Libya. The U.K. Embassy expects a sharply negative GOL reaction if al-Megrahi dies in prison or if the Scottish Executive and/or FCO oppose his transfer

Another stated that the UK feared action by Libya against British interests if Megrahi died in jail. It also stated that the UK government fully supported his release by the Scottish government.

=== Calls for and comments on a return to custody ===
Following the fall of the Gaddafi regime, the United States urged the Libyan National Transitional Council (NTC) to review the case, with a view towards deporting Megrahi if he did not die in the meantime. The Scottish government rejected the calls, saying that only it could make such a request, and that it would not do so, as Megrahi had abided by the conditions of his release. NTC leaders initially said that they would not deport Megrahi or any other Libyan, but also admitted that only the future elected government of Libya could deal with such issues.

Following the fall of Tripoli when forces of the NTC had largely taken control of Libya, there were calls for al-Megrahi to be extradited to the United States. These calls were dismissed by the Scottish government and the NTC in Libya until such time as a decision can be made by the new elected government.

The United States government has said that it has asked the new Libyan government to re-examine the Megrahi case.

On 30 August 2011, the Scottish First Minister Alex Salmond said, "The latest pictures broadcast of Mr al-Megrahi clearly demonstrate that he is an extremely sick man, dying of terminal prostate cancer. Hopefully, this will end the ridiculous conspiracy theories that seek to claim anything else." He also said that the issue was under Scottish jurisdiction and that what American lawyers and senators had to say "was neither here nor there". In October 2011, Al-Megrahi gave an interview from his bed in which he claimed that he had only days, weeks or months to live.

After the killing of Muammar Gaddafi on 20 October 2011, the United States Secretary of State Hillary Clinton called for al-Megrahi to be returned to prison in Scotland, describing the release of al-Megrahi as a miscarriage of justice. Additionally Clinton stated that having already raised the question of al-Megrahi's return to a Scottish prison with the leadership of the NTC, she would raise the matter again once a Libyan government had been formed. Clinton also indicated that, while preferring imprisonment in Scotland, she supported imprisonment outside Scotland over al-Megrahi remaining out of jail. In early November, the U.S. State Department indicated that it was preparing to make a "formal approach" to the NTC, requesting al-Megrahi's extradition to the United States.

== Death ==
Al-Megrahi died at home in Tripoli on 20 May 2012 at the age of 60. His funeral was held the following day, on 21 May.

British Prime Minister David Cameron, speaking at a NATO summit in Chicago, said that it was a day to think of the victims of "an appalling terrorist act". Scottish First Minister Alex Salmond also stated that people should use the occasion of al-Megrahi's death to remember the Lockerbie victims. The Guardian reported that Libyans "expressed relief rather than sadness" at news of al-Megrahi's death, as he was a reminder of the international sanctions that had impoverished the country following the bombing.

Many families of the Lockerbie victims called for al-Megrahi's appeal to be reopened following his death and headed by investigators outside Scotland, claiming that it would exonerate al-Megrahi. Cameron refused, stating, "I'm very clear that the court case was properly done and properly dealt with."

Alex Salmond said it was up to Megrahi's relatives to apply to the Scottish Criminal Case Review Commission to seek a further appeal, adding that his death "ends one chapter of the Lockerbie case, but it does not close the book".

=== Posthumous campaign and appeal ===
In May 2014, a group of relatives of the Lockerbie victims continued to campaign for al-Megrahi's name to be cleared by reopening the case.

On 5 June 2014, it was announced that Glasgow-based lawyer, Aamer Anwar, was instructed by immediate members of Al-Megrahi's family. Although Al-Megrahi had died from cancer following his compassionate release from prison an application was still being lodged with the Scottish Criminal Cases Review Commission seeking to review his case and return it to the appeal court as a miscarriage of justice. Aamer Anwar was also instructed by 24 British relatives of passengers who died on the flight, including Dr Jim Swire. In December 2014, Frank Mulholland, the Lord Advocate (Scotland's senior law officer), restated his belief that al-Megrahi had been guilty of the bombing and that he was hopeful that progress might be made in the continuing investigation to find al-Megrahi's accomplices.

In December 2018 Eddie Fenech Adami, Malta's Prime Minister at the time of the bombing, said "we have never accepted the theory" of how Abdul Baset Ali al-Megrahi transported the bomb from Malta to the UK and suggested that a miscarriage of justice had taken place.

In January 2021, the Scottish Court of Criminal Appeal rejected both the contention that a miscarriage of justice may have occurred over the non-disclosure of secret documents and also that a possibly unreasonable verdict had been arrived at. In contrast, the Scottish judges ruled that incriminating evidence concerning luggage tags, which had originally been deemed inadmissible, should have been ruled admissible at the original trial. The court found that the inclusion of this evidence made the case against al-Megrahi and his co-accused, Lamin Khalifah Fhimah, substantially stronger.

== See also ==
- Investigation into the bombing of Pan Am Flight 103
- Pan Am Flight 103 bombing trial
- Pan Am Flight 103 conspiracy theories
- Hans Köchler's Lockerbie trial observer mission
