= Duncan Johnson (DJ) =

Canadian radio jockey (1938–2018)

Duncan Johnson (aka Gerald Clements) (17 August 1938 - 11 October 2018) was a radio DJ, working in his native Canada and in the United Kingdom.

Born in Fergus, Ontario, during his early years he joined a radio station in Swift Current, Saskatchewan. After a time at CJOC in Lethbridge, Alberta, Duncan was offered a job in Bermuda where he stayed for a year and a half.

While in London on a trip, Johnson came across a newspaper article that outlined the formation of Radio London. At first he covered for broadcasters who were on shore leave, but eventually had his own show, "London After Midnight".

After leaving Radio London Duncan he appeared on the BBC Light Programme in 1966 and as one of the team of DJs on BBC Radio 1 when it launched in 1967, though he only appeared on the station for the first three months. He worked at EMI as a label manager and returned to radio working briefly for Radio Northsea, BBC Radio London presenting "London Country" and Radio Luxembourg.

In 1968, Johnson recorded a single for Spark Records, "The Big Architect".

In 1976 Johnson joined Capital Radio presenting "Afternoon Delight" and later the overnight show "Night Flight". Moving to Kent in 1984 he was part of the launch team at Invicta Radio. After leaving the station in 1988 he joined an advertising agency as a financial controller.

Diagnosed with Parkinson's disease in his sixties, Johnson continued to appear at offshore radio reunions including the Pirate Radio Essex broadcasts in 2004 and 2007. In his later years he lived at Brinsworth House and in October 2018 was admitted to West Middlesex University Hospital where he died on 11 October.
