= Jimmy McDougall =

Scottish lawyer

Jimmy McDougall was Procurator Fiscal in Dumfries when Pan Am Flight 103 crashed at Lockerbie, Scotland, on 21 December 1988 killing all 243 passengers and 16 crew on board, as well as 11 people in the town of Lockerbie .

== Responsibility ==
In Scotland, responsibility for the investigation of sudden deaths rests with the Procurator Fiscal, who will attend the scene and may direct the police in the conduct of their inquiries. The Procurator Fiscal holds a commission from the Lord Advocate who is a government minister. At the time of the bombing the Lord Advocate was a member of the UK government but, since devolution, is now a member of the Scottish Executive.

== Investigation ==
On 28 December 1988 – just a week after the crash – air accident investigators were able to announce that they had found traces of high explosive and that there was evidence that PA 103 had been brought down by an improvised explosive device. The prime responsibility for the investigation into the bombing of Pan Am Flight 103 fell to Jimmy McDougall, the Procurator Fiscal in the nearby town of Dumfries, and to the Dumfries & Galloway police force – the force with the fewest officers in Britain. The police effort was augmented by officers from all over Scotland as well as the north of England. McDougall was given support from the Crown Office in Edinburgh and in particular from Norman McFadyen, then head of the Fraud and Specialist Services Group and now Procurator Fiscal covering the Edinburgh area but also with special responsibility for the Lockerbie case.

== See also ==
- Pan Am Flight 103 conspiracy theories
- Pan Am Flight 103 bombing trial
