= Gerrit Pretorius =

South African politician and former diplomat

Member of the Western Cape Provincial Parliament
- In office 15 December 2022 – 28 May 2024
- Preceded by: Masizole Mnqasela

Speaker of the George Municipal Council
- In office 12 February 2018 – 1 November 2021
- Preceded by: Iona Kritzinger
- Succeeded by: Sean Snyman

Deputy Mayor of the George Local Municipality
- In office 25 August 2016 – 8 February 2018
- Preceded by: Daniel Maritz
- Succeeded by: Charlotte Clarke

Personal details
- Born: 1955 or 1956 (age 69–70)
- Party: Democratic Alliance
- Spouse: Lomine
- Children: 3
- Education: University of Port Elizabeth (BA)
- Profession: Diplomat, politician

Gerrit Pretorius (born 1955 or 1956) is a South African politician and former diplomat who was a Democratic Alliance Member of the Western Cape Provincial Parliament from December 2022 until May 2024. He was a municipal councillor of the George Local Municipality from 2016 to 2021, serving as the deputy mayor of the municipality from 2016 until 2018 and as council speaker from 2018 until he left council.

== Background ==
Pretorius attended Hoërskool Outeniqua (English: Outeniqua High School) before going on to study at the University of Port Elizabeth where he graduated with a Bachelor of Arts (BA) in Sociology and Administration. After university, Pretorius worked as a diplomat for the then white minority government of South Africa. He worked at the Department of Foreign Affairs in Pretoria before he was deployed to the South African embassies in London and Ottawa. In early-1987, Pretorius was notified that he would become the private secretary to Foreign Affairs Minister Pik Botha. His appointment become official on 1 May 1987 and he served in the position until 1989. He then worked in the private sector in Johannesburg for four years. Since 2000, Pretorius and his younger brother have operated a business in George.

== Local politics ==
Pretorius was elected as a Democratic Alliance municipal councillor of the George Local Municipality in the local government elections of 3 August 2016, after which he was elected deputy mayor to mayor Melvin Naik.

On 12 February 2018, Pretorius was elected council speaker following the resignation of Iona Kritzinger. Charlotte Clarke succeeded him as deputy mayor.

Pretorius was ranked low on the DA's proportional representation list for the local government elections of 1 November 2021 and left council as a result.

== Provincial politics ==
On 15 December 2022, Pretorius was sworn in as a DA Member of the Western Cape Provincial Parliament by speaker Daylin Mitchell. He filled the vacancy created by the termination of the former speaker of the provincial parliament Masizole Mnqasela's DA membership.

== Personal life ==
Pretorius is married to Lomine. They have three children together, two daughters and one son. Pretorius enjoys gardening.
