= MV Mebo II =

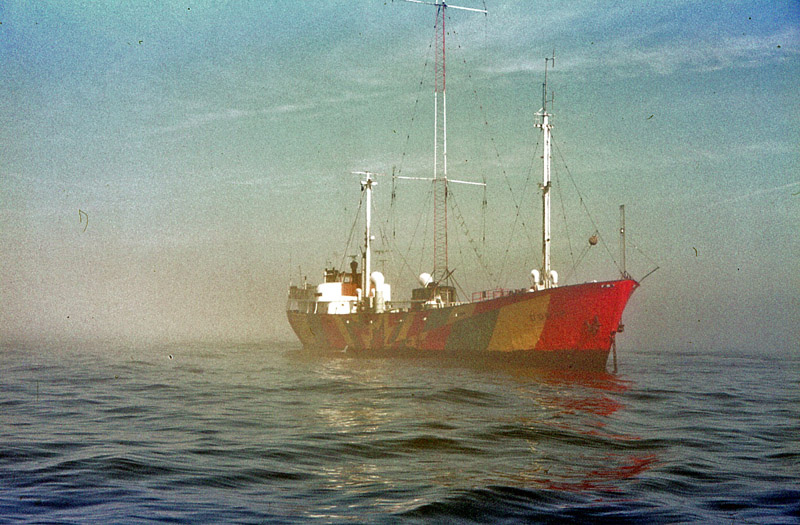
Mebo II

The Mebo II was originally the Dutch freighter Silvretta, built in 1948 by De Groot en van Vliet, Slikkerveer. It had a weight of 630 tons and a length of 186 feet. In 1969, it was bought by Edwin Bollier and Erwin Meister, renamed and converted into an offshore radio station at the same shipyard where it had been built. It was famous for its dramatic Art Nouveau color scheme.

From 1970–1974, it broadcast as Radio North Sea International (RNI) from international waters four miles off Scheveningen, one of the eight districts of The Hague, Netherlands. Transmissions were on AM medium wave (max105kW), shortwave (2x10kW) and FM (1 kW).

Following RNI's closure due to the Dutch Marine Offences Act, it was announced that the ship would move to Italy to broadcast as that country's first offshore radio station. However, this plan fell through, and in 1976 the ship sailed to Libya where it operated for some time in coastal waters relaying Libyan state radio. Later its broadcast operations ceased, and it was sunk in 1984 when it was targeted for Libyan rocket practice.
