= Tony Allan =

British broadcaster (1949-2004)

Tony Allan (22 September 1949 – 9 July 2004) was a British broadcaster and voice over artist. He broadcast almost exclusively on pirate radio stations and was highly regarded for his professionalism, his distinctive voice and clear diction, and for his ability to produce highly professional commercials and promotions.

== Career ==
Allan was 17 years old when he first worked for the pirate radio station Radio Scotland between 1966 and 1967. He had originally intended to work on another pirate station, Radio Caroline, but was rejected due to his age. When the Marine Broadcasting Offences Act 1967 was passed, he was the last DJ to broadcast live from the ship before managing director Tommy Shields's pre-recorded closedown programme.

He subsequently worked for Granada Television as a voice-over artist, and in Europe.

In the 1970s Allan worked first on RNI Radio Northsea International and did go later to the revived Radio Caroline, finally fulfilling his original ambition. When the Dutch Marine Offences Act came into force on 1 September 1974 it was Allan who announced that Caroline would continue broadcasting (following in the footsteps of Johnnie Walker who had done the same when the British law was passed in 1967). When Caroline's owner Ronan O'Rahilly announced that the station was to begin promoting his philosophy of "Loving Awareness", Allan became one of its most enthusiastic advocates, producing some of the most professional and memorable promotional ads for it.

Discussing Loving Awareness with fellow DJ Stuart Russell in 1977, Allan said:

The whole point about Loving Awareness, surely, is that if you have a love for somebody, it can be sexual, but then again at the same time it doesn't necessarily have to be sexual. It can be a loving thing which goes on and on and on; it can be a truthful thing; and those things work both ways. Does that make sense?

Allan worked on Caroline on and off between 1973 and 1979. During this time he also worked on the Mediterranean Sea-based, offshore radio station The Voice of Peace which broadcast to the Middle East.

In the late 1970s he went to Ireland and worked for Big D and ARD, two of the first 24-hour land-based pirate stations in Dublin. He later also worked for Sunshine Radio, Chris Cary's Radio Nova and South Coast Radio in Cork, among others.

He was also for a number of years the voice of the Guinness commercials Worldwide.

He returned to Britain in 1990 to work for the now re-launched satellite Radio Caroline but was already ill from cancer. Despite this, he kept working as long as he could attending pirate radio conventions and fundraising events for Caroline until he became too ill to do so.
