= Capital Radio (pirate) =

1970 offshore pirate radio

Offshore (international waters off the Netherlands); Netherlands
- Broadcast area: Netherlands, Belgium, eastern England
- Frequency: 1115 kHz (269 metres)
- Branding: Capital Radio

Programming
- Language: English
- Format: Pirate radio

Ownership
- Owner: International Broadcasters Society (IBS)

History
- First air date: 14 June 1970 (test); 1 September 1970 (official)
- Last air date: 10 November 1970

Capital Radio (not to be confused with the later British radio station of the same name) was a pirate radio station which operated from international waters off the coast of the Netherlands in 1970. It was broadcast from the ship King David. On 10 November 1970, the ship sent a mayday signal after it became unanchored during a storm, and later ran aground on the beach at Noordwijk. The DJs were rescued by the Royal Netherlands Sea Rescue Institution, after which they were delivered to the police.

== Broadcasting history ==
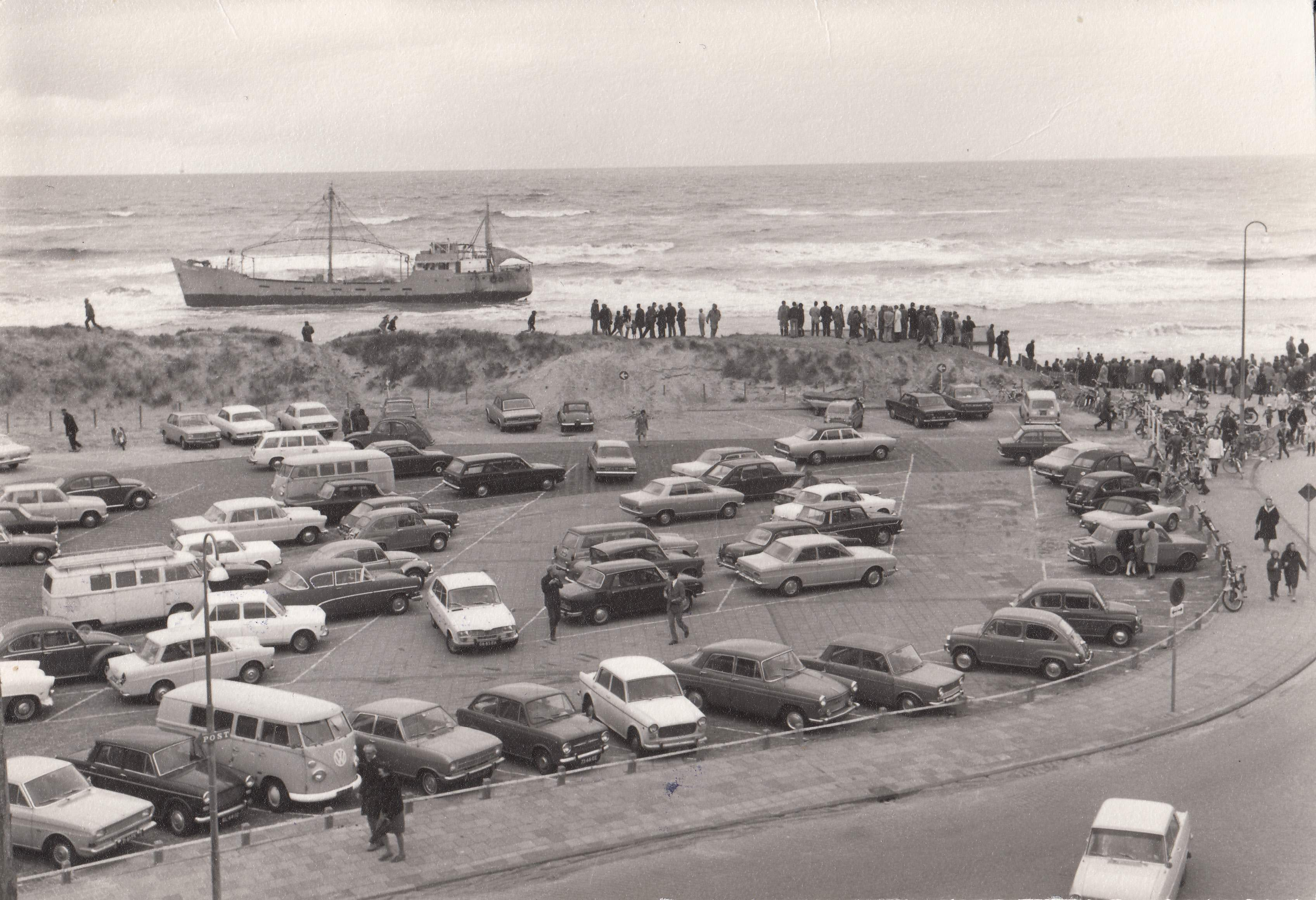
King David, Noordwijk, near Grand Hotel Huis ter Duin, just passed the (former) Palace Hotel, photo taken from 'de Grent', 1970

The ship originally took up position off of Noordwijk on April 25, 1970, but the antenna buckled in a force 8 gale and the ship had to return to port to have the antenna repaired.

The pirate radio station on board the King David began transmitting test transmissions off the Dutch coast on 14 June 1970, at 269 metres, 1115 kHz.

Official programming did not begin until 1 September. Ten days later, the antenna was damaged again and the ship sailed into Zaandam for service.

The station returned to the air on October 10 and broadcast uneventfully for a month.

On November 10, the ship lost its anchor in a force 12 storms and ran aground at Noordwijk. At that point the ship was impounded over unpaid debts owed to its tendering company. The IBS were unable to raise the necessary funds, and so the ship was seized, ending any chance for the station to continue.

== Antenna design ==
The ship was fitted with a 10-kilowatt transmitter that had allegedly belonged to Radio 270, and was equipped with an unusual horizontal loop antenna. The reasons for installing this type of antenna were also idealistic as well as technical. All other radio ships employed either vertical mast antennas, or horizontal antennas slung between fore and aft masts. These antenna types produced strong skywaves that could potentially cause interference to distant stations, especially at night. The horizontal loop radiated most of its energy in the form of a surface wave, thereby minimising any unwanted interference.

In practical terms, erecting a horizontal loop antenna on a ship caused several problems. The loop was supported by guy wires from a central mast. It was too wide for the ship to pass through Dutch ship canals, so the side sections had to be hinged so they could be raised to a vertical position until the ship was at sea. The initial design was not strong enough and one of the side sections buckled in strong winds, so the entire loop had to be reinforced and the guy wires strengthened.

Once the station went on air the loop antenna did produce an efficient signal, covering large parts of the Netherlands, Belgium and eastern England although the transmitter was only operated at 1 kilowatt. However, if the ship listed too far in heavy seas one side of the loop could make contact with the water, causing the transmitter to momentarily short out.
