= Offshore radio =

Radio broadcasting from ships or fixed maritime structures

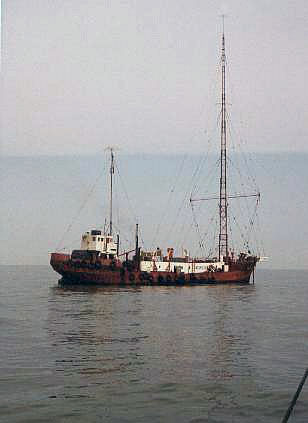
The MV Mi Amigo, one of the most infamous radio ships.

Offshore radio is radio broadcasting from ships or fixed maritime structures. Offshore broadcasters are usually unlicensed but transmissions are legal in international waters. This is in contrast to unlicensed broadcasting on land or within a nation's territorial waters, which is usually unlawful.

== History ==
The claimed first wireless broadcast of music and speech for the purpose of entertainment was transmitted from a Royal Navy craft, HMS Andromeda, in 1907. The broadcast was organized by Lieutenant Quentin Crauford using the callsign QFP while the ship was anchored off Chatham in the Thames Estuary, England.

However, the majority of offshore broadcasters have been unlicensed stations using seaborne broadcasting as a means to circumvent national broadcasting regulations, for example the practice has been used by broadcasting organizations like the Voice of America as a means of circumventing national broadcasting regulations of other nations. Unlicensed offshore commercial stations have operated off the coasts of Belgium, Denmark, Israel, the Netherlands, New Zealand, Sweden, the United Kingdom, Yugoslavia and the United States.

By the late 1920s, the "UK government concluded that radio was such a powerful means of mass communication that it would have to be in state control", and gave the publicly funded BBC a monopoly on broadcasting. Because of rigid governmental controls and programming mostly consisting of serious music and highbrow issues, much of the UK population began to turn to radio stations from abroad, such as Radio Lyon, Radio Normandy, Radio Athlone, Radio Mediterranee and Radio Luxembourg, especially on Sundays, when the BBC did not carry any entertainment programmes. However, English-speaking broadcast hours were limited and parts of the UK were unable to receive most stations properly during the daytime.

The earliest attempt to establish an offshore broadcaster in England occurred in 1928, when Associated Newspapers (owners of the Daily Mail) acquired the yacht Ceto and installed radio equipment. Unfortunately, the apparatus could not operate properly on board, the signal being heavily affected by the climate conditions. The transmitter was then replaced by Siemens loudspeakers and the Ceto toured England "broadcasting" gramophone records interspersed by advertising.

Unauthorized offshore broadcasting stations operating from ships or fixed platforms in the coastal waters of the North Sea first appeared in 1958. There were as many as eleven such stations in the mid-1960s.

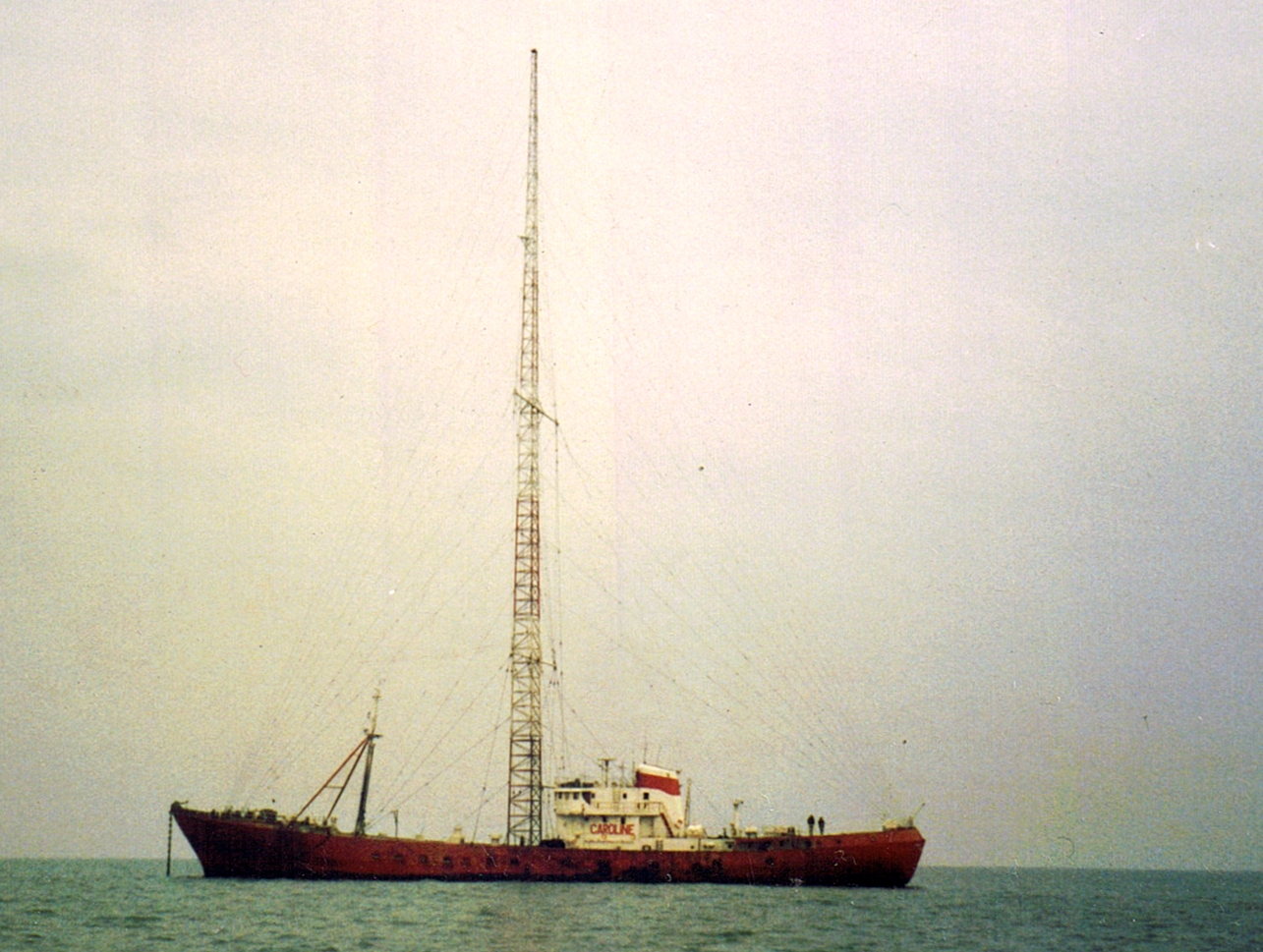
The MV Ross Revenge, had the tallest mast of any radio ship. The mast later collapsed in 1987.

One of the most popular offshore radio broadcasts in Europe came from Radio Caroline, which developed out of both the strict broadcasting regulations in England in the 1960s as well as the fact the major labels had left little to no airtime to less established acts. The Radio Caroline name was used to broadcast from international waters, using five different ships of three different owners, from 1964 to 1990. Radio Caroline was the brainchild of Ronan O'Rahilly, who dreamed up a way to air music by "unestablished" rock and roll artists Other well-known stations of the period were Radio Atlanta, Radio London, Radio 270 (broadcasting of the coast of Filey, Yorkshire) Radio 390, Radio Scotland, Radio Northsea International and Radio City.

Most offshore broadcast is usually associated with European unlicensed radio stations; the trend never caught on as much in the United States as most organizations that could afford an offshore broadcasting boat would instead buy a legal station. Still, there were a few American offshore stations that made a lasting impression. The first station to broadcast in the U.S. from international waters was RXKR off of the coast of California. and broadcast from May 1933 until August 1933. It was operated from a cargo carrier named the S.S. City of Panama, a ship that was actually supposed to be advertising tourism in Panama to Americans from California. The operators of the ship actually broadcast popular music and advertisements, fooling the Panamanian government and eventually being shut down at the request of the U.S. Department of State.

== Suppression ==
Unlicensed Radio and TV Noordzee since August 1964 used REM island offshore platform for broadcasting aimed at the Netherlands. On December 12, 1964, a law, which split the North Sea into continental sections was passed in the Netherlands. The sea bed under REM Island, to which the structure was attached, was declared Dutch territory. Five days later, Dutch Marines boarded the platform and ended the broadcasting.

The Council of Europe in 1965 passed the "European Agreement for the Prevention of Broadcasts transmitted from Stations outside National Territories" to address this loophole, although some member states were slow to implement this in national law. Radio broadcasts from ships that are unauthorized under the laws of the recipient may cause radio frequencies to be unusable. This can be potentially detrimental to certain emergency and security services. The 1965 agreement was an attempt to resolve this by treaty.

In 1967, the UK Government enacted the Marine, &c., Broadcasting (Offences) Act 1967, outlawing advertising on or supplying an unlicensed offshore radio station from the UK. Several other European countries passed similar legislation.

== List of offshore stations ==
Aimed at British listeners

- Radio Caroline
- Laser 558
- Radio London
- Radio City (previously Radio Sutch)
- Swinging Radio England
- Britain Radio
- Radio Scotland
- Radio 390 (Previously Radio Invicta, KING radio)
- Radio 355
- Radio 270
- Radio Atlanta
- Tower Radio
- Radio Seagull
- Radio Essex (later BBMS)
- CNBC Commercial Neutral Broadcasting Company

Netherlands and Belgium

- Radio Northsea International -also targeted British and (occasionally) German listeners
- Radio and TV Noordzee
- Radio Veronica
- Radio Monique
- Radio Atlantis
- Radio Mi Amigo Internationaal
- Radio Delmare
- Capital Radio
- Radio 819
- Radio Antwerpen aka Radio Uilenspiegel
- Radio Paradijs
- Radio Dolfijn
- Radio 227

Scandinavia

- Radio Nord (Sweden)
- Radio Syd (Sweden)
- Radio Mercur (Denmark and Sweden)
- Danmarks Commercielle Radio Denmark

United States

- RXKR 1933
- Radio Free America 1973
- Radio Newyork International 1987-88

New Zealand

- Radio Hauraki

Middle East

- Voice of Peace (Israel)
- Arutz Sheva (Israel)
- Odelia TV (Israel)
- Radio One (Israel)
- Radio Hof (Israel)
- Radio Gal (Israel)
- Radio Dan (Israel)
- Galei Hayam Hatichon (Israel)
- Arutz 2000 (Israel)

Others

- Voice of America (United States Coast Guard Cutter Courier, moored off Rhodes, Greece)
- SPLAJBC/LBJ Libyan State Radio
- Radio Brod Former Yugoslavia
- World Mission Radio

== See also ==
- The Boat That Rocked, 2009 film
- Border blaster
- Extraterritorial jurisdiction
- Marine, &c., Broadcasting (Offences) Act 1967 (UK)
- Pirate radio
- https://sixtiescity.net/Radio/PirateRadio.shtm
