= Release of Abdelbaset al-Megrahi =

2009 Scottish release of the Lockerbie bomber

Abdelbaset al-Megrahi (a Libyan who was head of security for Libyan Arab Airlines, director of the Centre for Strategic Studies in Tripoli, Libya, and an alleged Libyan intelligence officer) was convicted on 31 January 2001 by a special Scottish Court in the Netherlands for the bomb attack on Pan Am Flight 103 on 21 December 1988 over Lockerbie. After he was diagnosed with terminal prostate cancer, he was released from prison on compassionate grounds on 20 August 2009 by the Scottish Government, having served 8 1/2 years of a life sentence. His release was authorised by Scottish Justice Secretary Kenny MacAskill. The decision attracted significant news coverage, engendering widespread celebration in Libya, a largely hostile reaction in the United States and a more equally divided reaction in Britain.

It would take 33 months for the cancer to kill al-Megrahi, exceeding the approximate three months suggested in August 2009. His prolonged survival generated much controversy. In Libya, he was released from hospital and later lived at his family's villa. His death was announced on 20 May 2012.

== Background ==
Pan Am Flight 103 was Pan American World Airways' third daily scheduled transatlantic flight from London's Heathrow Airport to New York's John F. Kennedy International Airport. On Wednesday 21 December 1988, the aircraft flying this route—a Boeing 747-121 named Clipper Maid of the Seas—was destroyed by a bomb, killing all 243 passengers and 16 crew members. Eleven people in Lockerbie, southern Scotland, were killed as large sections of the plane fell in and around the town, bringing total fatalities to 270.

After a three-year joint investigation by Dumfries and Galloway Constabulary and the US Federal Bureau of Investigation, Megrahi, a Libyan intelligence officer and the head of security for Libyan Arab Airlines (LAA), and Al Amin Khalifa Fhimah, a station manager for LAA, were indicted for the bombing in November 1991. Libya refused to hand them over. After UN sanctions prompted negotiations, Libya agreed to bench trial in the Netherlands before a Scottish court. The United States was given what the then British ambassador, speaking in a personal capacity in August 2009, characterised as a "clear political and diplomatic understanding" that Megrahi would serve his full sentence in Scotland.

At the trial at the Scottish Court in the Netherlands, witnesses, two of whom were paid millions of dollars apiece for their testimony, were heard. Megrahi was convicted of involvement in the bombing and sentenced to life imprisonment; however, Fhimah had an air-tight alibi and was found not guilty. The trial judges recommended that Megrahi should serve at least 20 years before being eligible for parole. One witness later recanted.

== Release application and decision to release ==
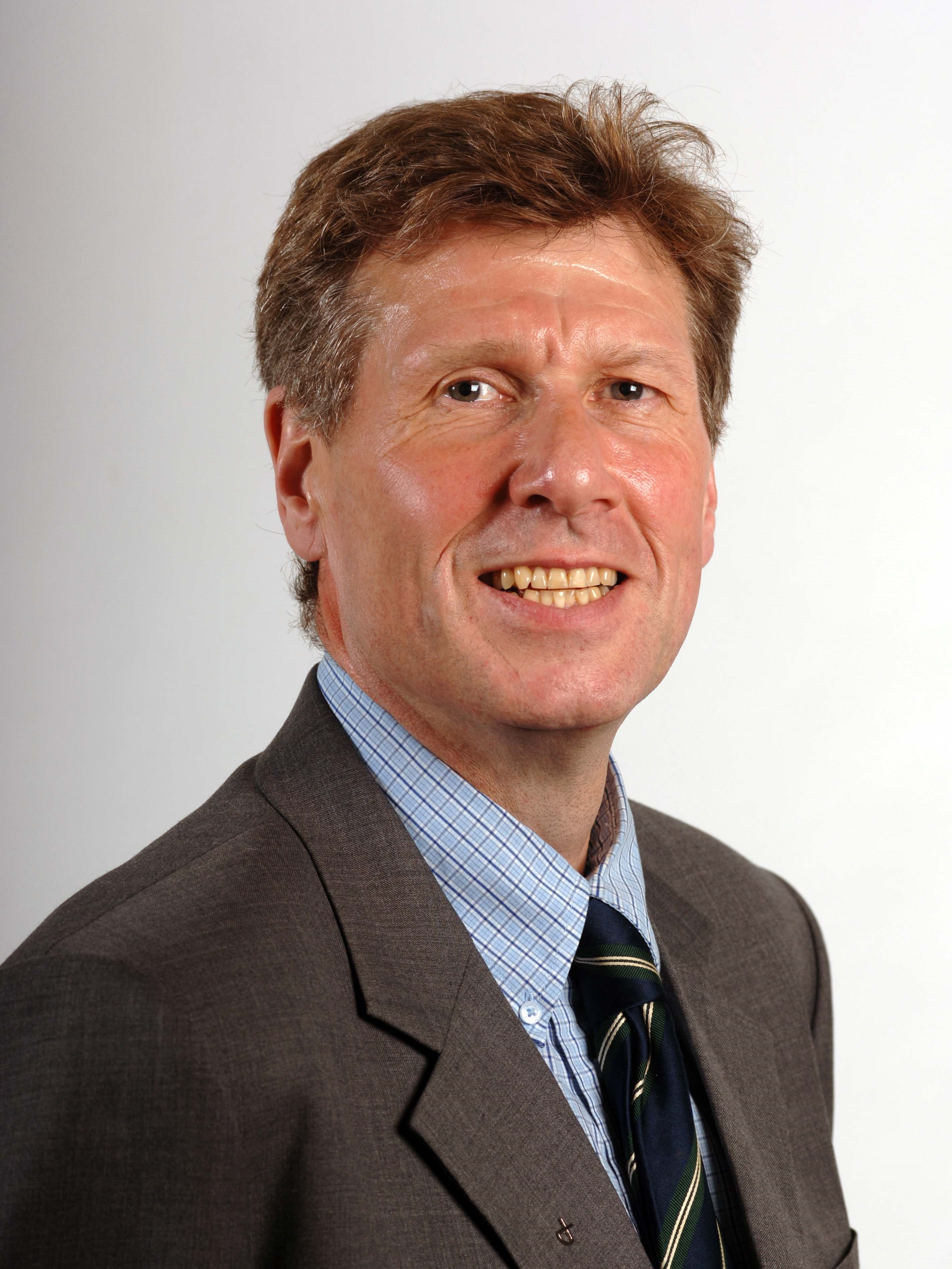
Kenny MacAskill, the Cabinet Secretary for Justice in the Scottish Government who granted al-Megrahi's release

On 24 July 2009, Al Megrahi's legal team made a request for him to be released from prison on compassionate grounds. Although it was not a precondition for compassionate release, his defence counsel lodged a request to abandon his second appeal on 12 August 2009, shortly after his private meeting with the Justice Secretary in Greenock jail on 4 August 2009. The abandonment of Megrahi's appeal was accepted by the High Court of Justiciary on 18 August 2009.

Megrahi had developed prostate cancer. The Scottish Secretary of Justice at the time, Kenny MacAskill ordered his release under a 1993 Scottish statute enabling the release from prison of anyone deemed by competent medical authority to have three months or less to live. MacAskill has said repeatedly that he bears sole responsibility for the decision. In addition to the Scottish government's own medical examinations which were the only ones contributing to the release decision, the Libyan government arranged for extra examinations, which involved, among others, Dr Karol Sikora of the University of Buckingham, who examined Megrahi in prison early in July, and requested an "urgent" decision on returning him to Libya because he believed Megrahi had only a very short period of time to live.

An Afriqiyah Airways aircraft—the personal aircraft of Colonel Gaddafi, registered 5A-IAY—was flown to Glasgow Airport on 20 August 2009 to collect Megrahi. The aircraft then flew Megrahi directly to Tripoli.

== Reactions to release ==
=== Scottish reaction ===
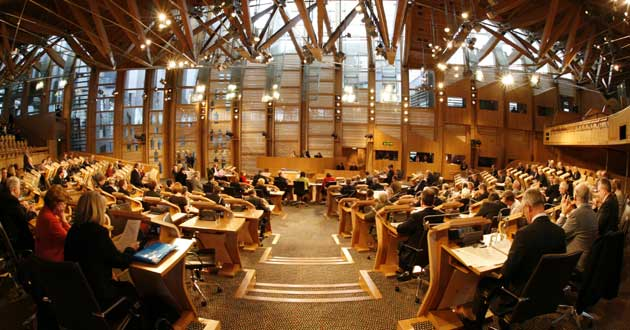
The Scottish Parliament was recalled from its summer break as a result of the release of Megrahi

The release divided opinions across Scotland and the Scottish Parliament was recalled from its summer break to receive a statement from and question MacAskill, for only the third time in its ten-year history.

A BBC/ICM poll found that 60% of Scots thought the Scottish Government was wrong to release Megrahi, although 56% said MacAskill should not resign. The poll also found that 74% of those polled believed that, "the affair had damaged Scotland's reputation." A Ipsos Mori poll of Scots published on 29 August 2009 showed a narrow plurality of 47% to 40% opposed to MacAskill's decision.

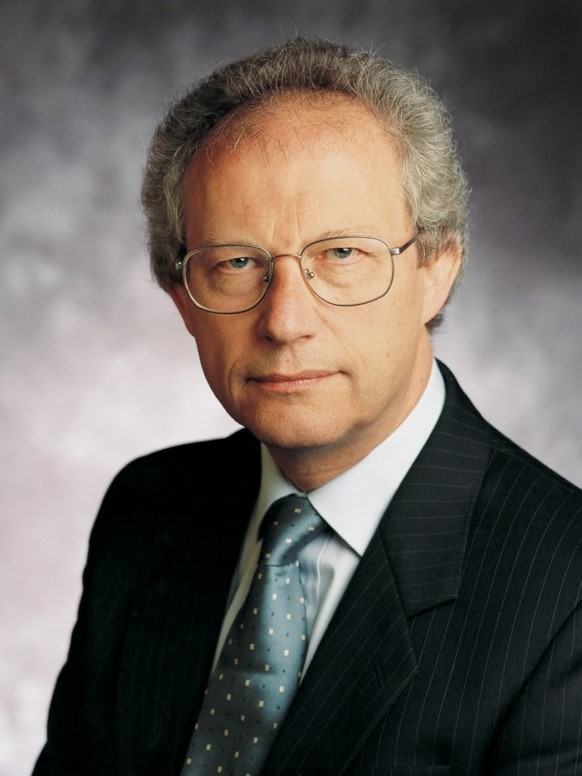
Former First Minister Henry McLeish criticised comments from FBI director Robert Mueller's, saying his comments were "an unfair slur on the Scots justice system"

Views representing the faith communities were generally supportive. Rev. Ian Galloway, the convener of the Church of Scotland's Church and Society Council, said that "justice is not lost in acting in mercy." Similarly, the Archbishop of Glasgow, Mario Conti, voiced his personal support for the decision, describing compassion as "one of the principles inscribed on the mace of the Scottish Parliament by which Scotland's government should operate".

Political opponents of the SNP government attacked the decision. Iain Gray, the Scottish Labour leader, said that "The SNP's handling of this case has let down Scotland. Kenny MacAskill's conduct has damaged the Scottish Justice system and, in turn, Scotland's international reputation." Richard Baker, the Scottish Labour shadow justice minister, said the decision was "an act of unpardonable folly" and called for MacAskill's resignation. Former Scottish Labour First Minister Jack McConnell said that MacAskill had "damaged Scotland in a way 'that will take years to recover." Writing in the Telegraph, former Labour MP and Scottish Office minister Brian Wilson wrote that the decision "shamed" Scotland, and co-opted an anti-war slogan to sum up his anger: "Not in our name, Mr MacAskill."

However, former Labour MP Tam Dalyell, who has long believed in Megrahi's innocence, said that MacAskill "had arrived at the right decision on compassionate grounds" and former Labour First Minister Henry McLeish described FBI director Robert Mueller's attack on the decision as 'out of order' saying it was "an unfair slur on the Scots justice system".

=== UK reaction ===
A poll commissioned by The Times newspaper found that 61% of Britons thought that MacAskill had made the wrong decision, and 45% thought that the release had more to do with oil than Megrahi's terminal illness.

Richard Dalton, a former British ambassador to Libya, said while he understood public anger about the release, "there are not good reasons why anybody convicted of that crime should be excepted from normal rules which apply for considering release on compassionate grounds."

John Mosey, an ordained Christian minister, who lost a daughter on Pan Am Flight 103, expressed his disappointment that halting Megrahi's appeal before it went to court meant that the public would never hear "this important evidence – the six separate grounds for appeal that the SCCRC felt were important enough to put forward, that could show that there's been a miscarriage of justice."

The British Government has so far declined to express an opinion on the decision, but has denied that it gave succour to terrorists, and condemned the scenes at Tripoli airport. Alistair Darling pointed out that as a question of criminal justice, and thus a devolved matter, it would be inappropriate for Westminster to comment on it. Conservative leader and future prime minister David Cameron called the decision "the product of some completely nonsensical thinking", and "wrong," stating; "I see no justice in affording mercy to someone who showed no mercy to his victims." He wrote to then prime minister Gordon Brown, calling on him to express an opinion.

Local priest Patrick Keegans, who served the Lockerbie community for five and a half years, commented on the general feeling of the community, "There's mixed reactions and mixed views. The majority of people are uncertain but a great number are of the same mind as myself. An innocent man has been convicted and they're happy to see him released."

Martin Cadman, whose son Bill was killed, said "I'm very pleased he has been released on compassionate grounds because I don't think he was the right person to be there anyway. It is just righting a wrong...I think he was innocent and he was not involved. I don't believe he should have been in prison and I'm very pleased he will be back home with his family very soon." Doctor Jim Swire, whose 23-year-old daughter Flora was killed in the Lockerbie bombing, said "I don't believe for a moment that this man was involved in the way that he was found to have been involved. I feel despondent that The West and Scotland didn't have the guts to allow this man's second appeal to continue because I am convinced had they done so it would have overturned the verdict against him."

==== British media reaction ====
The Times, the English edition of The Daily Telegraph, and The Economist condemned Megrahi's release. By contrast, The Scotsman, The Herald, The Independent, and the Scottish edition of the Telegraph called it controversial, but the right decision. Kenneth Roy, a former BBC broadcaster and editor of the Scottish Review, accused the BBC of bias in its reporting of Megrahi's release, arguing that it had overplayed public hostility and understated public support for MacAskill's decision.

=== U.S. reaction ===
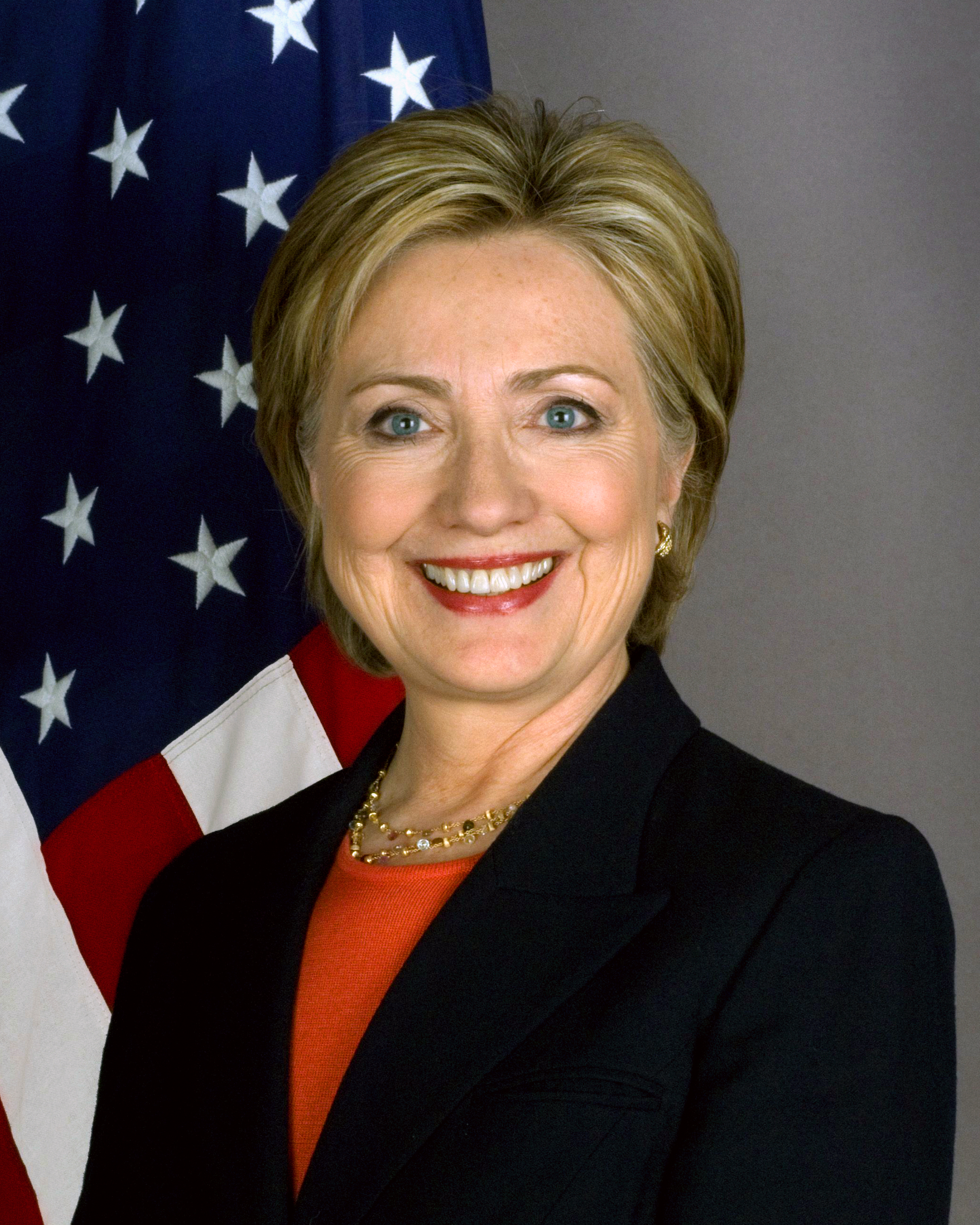
United States Secretary of State Hillary Clinton said the decision to release Abdelbaset al-Megrahi was "absolutely wrong"

In the United States, where 189 of the 270 Lockerbie victims came from, the decision was generally greeted with hostility. Susan Cohen told The Daily Telegraph: "You want to feel sorry for anyone, please feel sorry for me, feel sorry for my poor daughter, her body falling a mile through the air". Very few American relatives offered public support for MacAskill's decision, although in May 2010 a sister of one of the victims expressed her desire to visit and forgive Megrahi, saying "I want to look him in the eye and make sure he knows our pain... God will judge him". She said the decision to release him was "more than we could ever expect from Libya if the tables were turned.". Polling taken the following week found that 82% of Americans opposed the decision, and 10% supported it. A campaign to "Boycott Scotland" emerged on the internet, encouraging Americans to halt tourism and boycott Scottish products.

The decision was called "absolutely wrong" by Secretary of State Hillary Clinton, who addressed concerns to MacAskill and the Foreign Secretary. It was denounced as "an outrage" and a "caving in" by Senator Frank Lautenberg. President Barack Obama denounced the decision and Attorney General Eric Holder said that there was "no justification for releasing this convicted terrorist whose actions took the lives of 270 individuals." Senator John Kerry, the former Democratic Presidential candidate, said that the decision "turn[s] the word ’compassion’ on its head." FBI director Robert Mueller, who had been a lead investigator in the 1988 bombing, was "outraged at [the] decision, blithely defended on the grounds of 'compassion'" and called it "as inexplicable as it is detrimental to the cause of justice" in an open letter to MacAskill. Independent Senator Joe Lieberman and Democratic Senator Ben Cardin called for an inquiry into the decision.

The New York Times opined that "for many Americans, his release rekindled the agony and anguish of loss and provoked questions about the notions of compassion and justice used by Scotland to justify its decision." The Chicago Tribune said that "MacAskill's self-praising paean to his own mercy ... mocked [the] victims" and was "feckless." The Los Angeles Times said that "MacAskill's blinkered interpretation of 'compassion' took no account of the enormity of Megrahi's crime or his refusal to acknowledge his guilt," and showed "no compassion for relatives of the 270 people killed when the jet exploded over Lockerbie."

The bombing of Flight 103 was the worst act of terrorism waged against the United States until the attacks on 11 September 2001.

=== Other reactions ===
Saif al-Islam Gaddafi said that MacAskill was "a great man". Reiterating his belief in Megrahi's innocence, he added that the Justice Secretary had "made the right decision" and that "history will prove this". The Libyan English language newspaper Tripoli Post claimed however that MacAskill's statement proved that the Scottish authorities did not take care of Megrahi while he was imprisoned.

A letter in support of MacAskill's decision was sent to the Scottish Government on behalf of former South African President Nelson Mandela.

Editorials in the leading German language newspapers Frankfurter Allgemeine Zeitung (in Germany) and Die Presse (in Austria), lauded the humanity shown by MacAskill's decision.

== Aftermath ==
Immediately following Megrahi's release there were claims and counterclaims concerning alleged commercial deals which had been struck to affect the release.

According to some Western press, Colonel Muammar Gaddafi's son, Saif al-Islam Gaddafi, had claimed that the release of Megrahi was linked to trade deals between Britain and Libya, but when interviewed by The Herald shortly after Megrahi's arrival in Libya, Saif al-Islam Gaddafi stated that Megrahi's release was not tied to any oil deals but was an entirely separate issue. Referring to the Prisoner Transfer Agreement (PTA), he continued, "People should not get angry because we were talking about commerce or oil. We signed an oil deal at the same time. The commerce and politics and deals were all with the PTA. This was one animal and the other was the compassionate release. They are two completely different animals." It was later discovered that Libyan officials had warned the United Kingdom that consequences for the UK-Libya bilateral relationship would be 'dire' were al-Megrahi to die in Scottish prison, including the cessation of all UK commercial activity in Libya.

It was also revealed that Adam Ingram, who stood down as the UK armed forces minister in 2007, received up to £25,000 a year from Argus Libya UK Limited, described as a firm that "sniffs out" commercial opportunities in the North African country.

In the days following Megrahi's release and return to Libya, speculation began to mount as to the possible involvement of the Westminster Government in the Scottish Government's decision, particularly after Saif Gaddafi claimed that Megrahi's case had been discussed during business talks with the UK, and after Colonel Gaddafi thanked Gordon Brown for "encouraging" the release. This prompted Downing Street to confirm that Brown had discussed a possible release with Gaddafi during the G8 summit in Italy in July 2009, but that a letter sent by Brown to the Libyan leader had stated, "When we met I stressed that, should the Scottish Government decide that Megrahi can return to Libya, this should be a purely private, family occasion."

It was also claimed that Business Secretary, Peter Mandelson, had met with Saif Gaddafi on at least two occasions at which a possible release had been discussed. Mandelson confirmed this, but said that he had told Gaddafi that any release was entirely a matter for the Scottish Justice Secretary. He went on to describe as "offensive" any suggestions that a release had been linked to a trade deal with Libya.

On 20 August 2009, the United States government issued an official press release condemning the decision of the Scottish Government to release Abdel Basset Mohamed al-Megrahi and stated, "Megrahi was convicted and sentenced to life in prison for his role in the bombing of Pan Am Flight 103, which blew up over Scotland on 21 December 1988. As we have expressed repeatedly to officials of the government of the United Kingdom and to the Scottish Government, we continue to believe that Megrahi should serve out his sentence in Scotland."

On 23 August 2009, ex-CIA analyst, Robert Baer, claimed that the CIA had known throughout that the bombing of Flight 103 had been orchestrated by Iran, and that a secret dossier was to be presented as evidence in Megrahi's final appeal which was to prove this, suggesting that the withdrawal of the appeal to allow release on compassionate grounds was encouraged to prevent this information from being presented in court.

The First Minister of Scotland, Alex Salmond, told BBC Radio 4, "I think it was the right decision. I also absolutely know it was for the right reasons."

=== Scottish Parliament ===
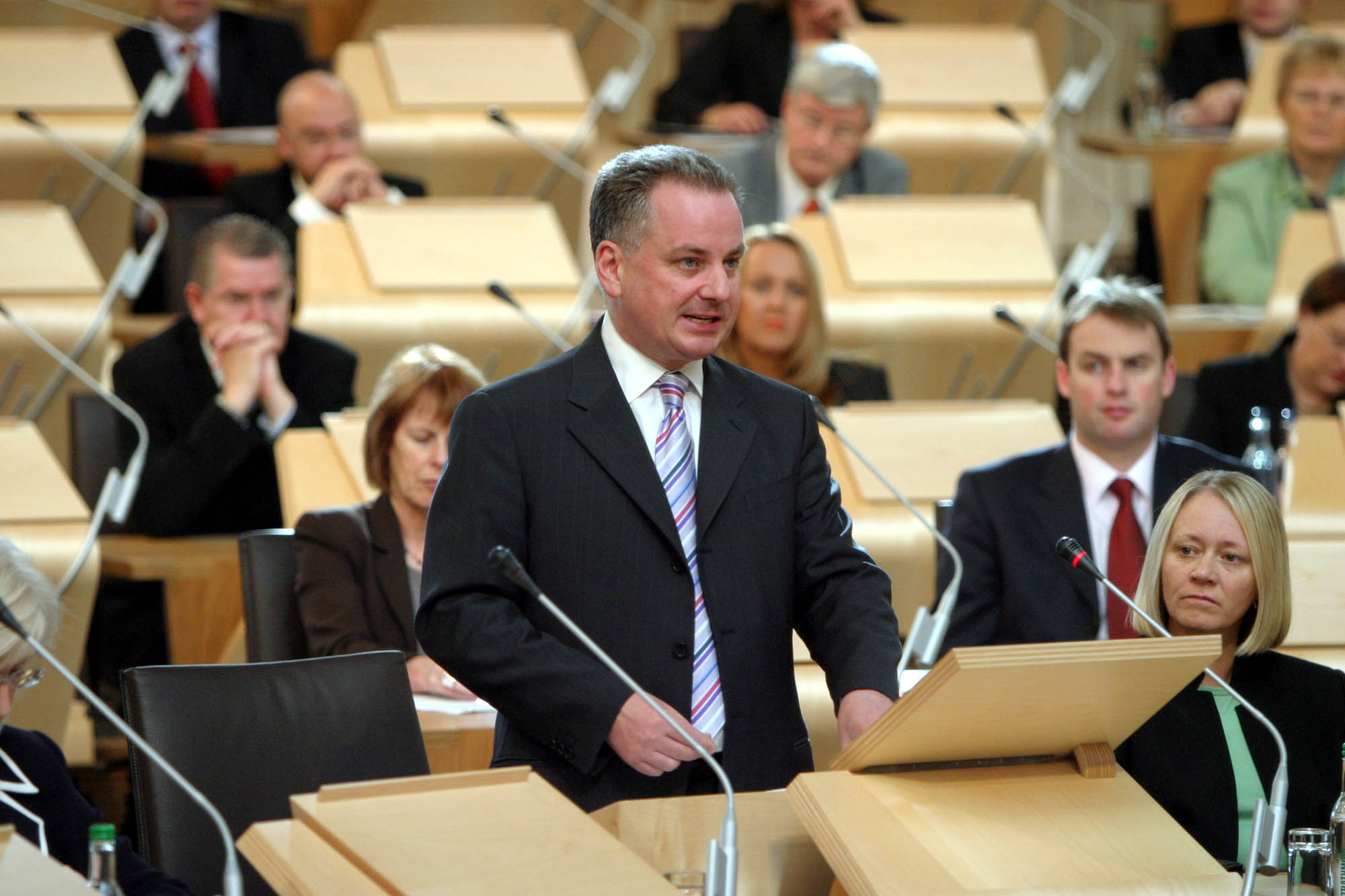
Jack McConnell, former First Minister, expressed his desire for the Scottish Government and Scottish Parliament to make clear that the decision for the release of al-Megrahi "was not made by the people of Scotland and that it does not have the endorsement of the Scottish people"

On 20 August 2009, it was announced that the Scottish Parliament would be recalled the following Monday so MSPs could hear a statement from the Justice Secretary, Kenny MacAskill, and ask him questions. An earlier call for it to be reconvened had been dismissed. Former First Minister Jack McConnell said, "The Scottish Parliament has a responsibility to take action to repair some of the damage done. I believe that the Scottish Parliament should make clear that this decision was not made by the people of Scotland and that it does not have the endorsement of the Scottish people."

The special sitting of the Scottish Parliament took place on 24 August 2009. The Scottish Justice Minister was strongly criticised by opposition Parties for his decision throughout the session, but maintained he had made the right one, telling the parliament, "It was my decision and my decision alone. I stand by it and I'll live by the consequences." He was supported in this by several members of his own party.

The Scottish Justice Minister also claimed that sending Megrahi to a hospice in Scotland, would have created a "travelling circus" with such a high-profile patient.

Many MSPs questioned the reasons behind the decision; the Scottish Conservative Party justice spokesman Bill Aitken MSP stated, "The SNP government has demonstrated a degree of amateurishness which has caused us embarrassment. Scotland's international reputation has taken a real hit in this respect...the UK government doesn't come out of this too well either." He further added that there were inconsistencies between what Peter Mandelson and Colonel Gaddafi's son had said concerning the decision.

On 25 August 2009, Strathclyde Police told The Times that "We were asked how many [officers] it would take in our opinion. In terms of guidance we were not asked whether we could do this," about the possibility of keeping Megrahi in a safe house in Scotland. The police comments apparently contradicted those made by the Justice Minister. The police later issued a second statement, after being contacted by the Justice Department stating that there was, "absolutely no difference between the position of Strathclyde Police and the information communicated by the Justice Secretary to Parliament. We informed government that the policing operation required for compassionate release of Mr al-Megrahi in Scotland, and the security implications, would have been highly substantial." A Scottish government spokesperson later reiterated that cost was not a factor in deciding to send Megrahi back to Libya as they would have borne the cost of any safe house provided in Glasgow.

A full debate on the decision was held in the Scottish Parliament on 2 September, the first full day of the Parliament's return from its summer recess.

On 11 January 2010, it was announced that Scottish MPs were due to question Alex Salmond and Kenny MacAskill about the release of al-Megrahi. The Scottish Affairs Committee held the hearing at Westminster as part of an investigation into communication between the Scottish and British governments; in particular, how such communication worked in the case of the decision to release al-Megrahi. According to Salmond, applicable protocols were followed, and both the US and UK governments were informed prior to the release.

=== UK Government ===
The British Prime Minister, Gordon Brown, faced mounting criticism over his silence on the issue, particularly after he took time to send a letter of congratulations to the England Cricket team on their victory in the 2009 Ashes series while failing to comment on the Megrahi release. On 25 August 2009, he told a press conference at Downing Street that he was "angry" and "repulsed" by the reception Megrahi had received in Libya. He refused to comment on the Scottish government's decision to release Megrahi but stressed that the UK Government had played "no role" in the matter.

Documents released in September showed that Jack Straw, the justice secretary did initially agree with the Scottish Government that Abdelbaset al-Megrahi should be excluded from a prisoner transfer agreement with the Libyans. Then three months later, Straw decided that such an exclusion was not worth the risk of "damaging our wide-ranging and beneficial relationship with Libya."

A letter dated 19 December 2007 stated that the decision to include Megrahi in the scope of the agreement reflected the "overwhelming interests" of the UK at a "critical stage" in the "wider negotiations with the Libyans".

In a subsequent letter to Alex Salmond, the Scottish first minister, in February 2008, Straw wrote: “You ask what I meant by ‘national interests’. Developing a strong relationship with Libya … is good for the UK.”

=== Allegations of BP lobbying ===
In July 2010, in response to suggestions that BP may have been involved in lobbying for the release of Abdelbaset al-Megrahi, Scotland's First Minister Alex Salmond wrote to Senator Kerry saying: "I can say unequivocally that the Scottish Government has never, at any point, received any representations from BP in relation to AI-Megrahi. That is to say we had no submissions or lobbying of any kind from BP, either oral or written, and, to my knowledge, the subject of AIMegrahi was never raised by any BP representative to any Scottish Government Minister. That includes the Justice Minister to whom it fell to make the decisions on prisoner transfer and compassionate release on a quasi-judicial basis. Where BP has admitted that it played a role is in encouraging the UK Government to conclude a Prisoner Transfer Agreement (PTA) with the Libyan Government. I must make clear that the Scottish Government strongly opposed the PTA and the memorandum that led to it was agreed without our knowledge and against our wishes."

=== 2011 Scottish Parliament election ===
Despite speculation that this would affect the re-election prospects of politicians involved, at the time of the Scottish Parliament general election, a Scottish National party (SNP) supporter said that the decision had been mentioned by very few voters during the election campaign. Subsequently, MacAskill won election to a redrawn constituency of Edinburgh Eastern in the 2011 Scottish Parliament election. Despite notionally facing a deficit of 550 votes, MacAskill won by over 2000 votes., while his party, in a surprise landslide, increased from 47 seats to win 69 out of a possible 129 seats to become Scotland's first majority government, and the only majority government in the United Kingdom at that time. Party leader Alex Salmond who had rebuffed demands from US senators to travel to America to explain the decision to a US Senate committee, was re-elected with an increased majority to his Aberdeenshire East constituency, to remain as First Minister for a further five years.

The Labour Party, who repeatedly attacked the SNP on the Megrahi release in the run-up to the election, performed less well in the Scottish election, falling from 46 to 37 seats.

=== Death ===
On 20 May 2012, Abdelbaset al-Megrahi died at home aged 60, his brother Abdulhakim told Reuters on Sunday. His health had deteriorated quickly, Abdulhakim said, and he died at 13:00 local time (11:00 GMT). Megrahi's sister told the Libyan Wal news agency that his funeral would take place at Tripoli's main cemetery on Monday, following early afternoon prayers.
