= Jim Swire =

English father of 1988 Lockerbie bombing victim

- Born: Herbert Swire; 1936 (age 89–90); Windsor, Berkshire, England
- Occupation: General practitioner
- Known for: Views and research on the 1988 bombing of Pan Am Flight 103 over Lockerbie, Scotland
- Spouse: Jane
- Children: 3

Herbert Swire (born 1936), known better as Jim Swire, is an English doctor best known for his involvement in the aftermath of the 1988 bombing of Pan Am Flight 103, in which his daughter Flora was killed. Swire lobbied toward a solution for the difficulties in bringing suspects in the original bombing to trial, and later advocated the retrial and release of Abdelbaset al-Megrahi, the originally convicted suspect in the case.

In 1990, Swire carried a fake bomb – a near-exact replica of the one that killed his daughter – onto two different aircraft, one in the UK and a connecting one in the US, as a demonstration of lax security in both countries.

== Biography ==
Herbert Swire was born in Windsor, Berkshire, the son of Roger, a colonel in the British Army based at Windsor Castle, and his wife Otta, the daughter of Sir William Woodthorpe Tarn. He spent part of his childhood on the Isle of Skye, and attended Eton College and Trinity College, Cambridge, where he studied natural sciences. He then worked for the BBC as a technologist before training to be a minister in the Church of England at Ridley Hall theological college. Swire met his future wife Jane at Cambridge, and it was she who persuaded him to turn his career ambitions towards medicine. Training to be a doctor at the University of Birmingham Medical School, he realised he was too old to embark upon a career as a surgeon and instead opted to become a general practitioner. Following graduation, he joined a practice in Bromsgrove, Worcestershire, and lived there with his wife and three children, Flora, Catherine and William.

== Lockerbie bombing ==
On 20 December 1988, Swire's 23-year-old daughter Flora, who wanted to fly to the United States to spend Christmas with her American boyfriend, had little difficulty in booking a seat on the next day's transatlantic Pan Am Flight 103, with only 243 of 366 seats sold. Flora died when it exploded over the town of Lockerbie, Scotland, killing at least 270 people, including 11 on the ground. Investigations were soon launched in the United States and the United Kingdom.

Eventually, two Libyans, Abdelbaset al-Megrahi and Lamin Khalifah Fhimah, were accused.

Swire became a spokesman for UK Families Flight 103, a group of family members of those who had died in the air crash.

Swire planted a memorial woodland for his daughter, known as Flora's Wood, near their home in Gloucestershire.

== Fake bomb ==
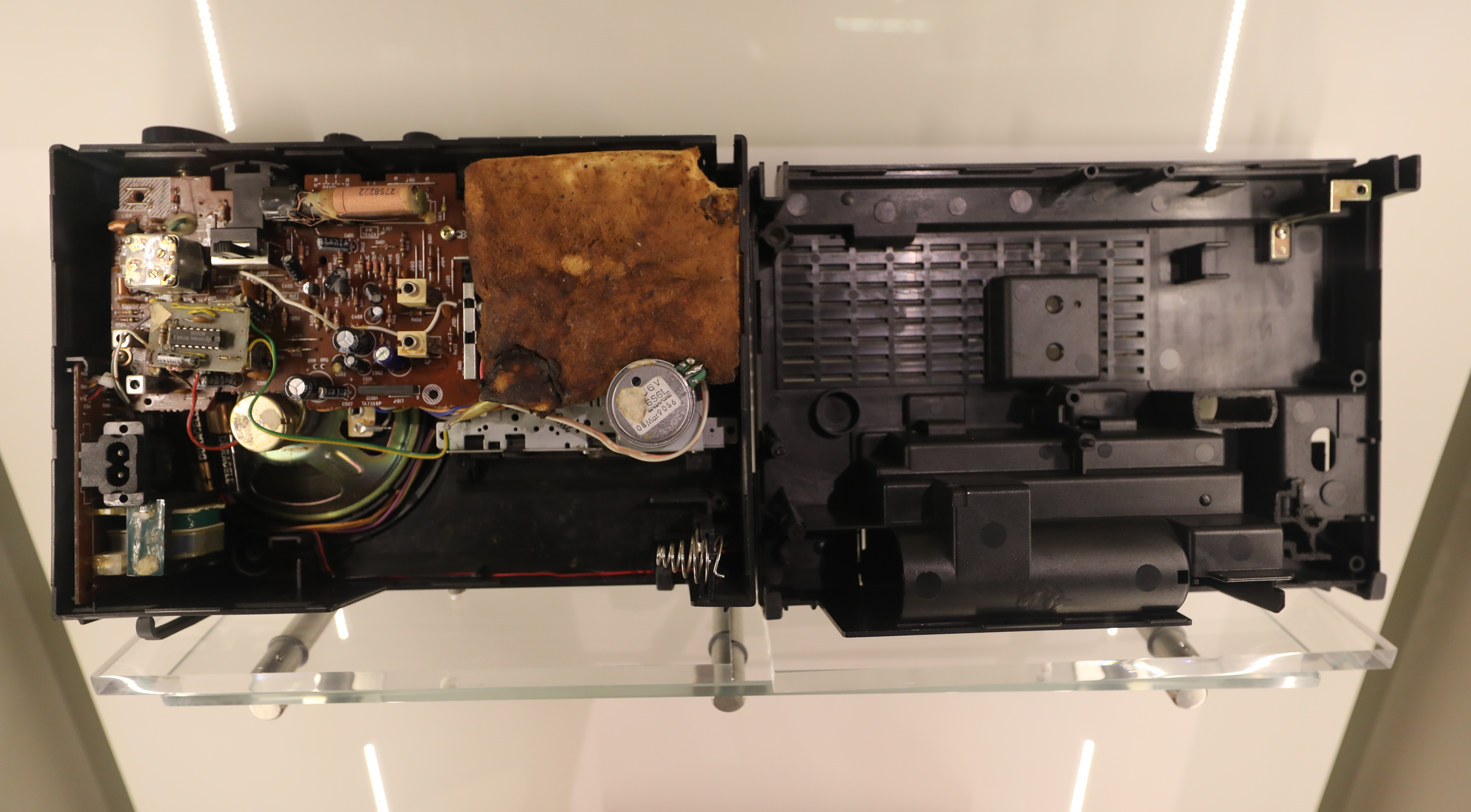
Jim Swire's fake bomb

On 18 May 1990, Swire took a fake bomb on board a British Airways flight from London's Heathrow airport to New York's JFK and then on a flight from New York JFK to Boston to show that airline security had not improved; his fake bomb consisted of a radio cassette player and the confectionery marzipan, which was used as a substitute for Semtex. Some American family members asked Swire to keep the news of the stunt quiet; it became public six weeks later. Susan and Daniel Cohen, parents of Pan Am Flight 103 victim Theodora Cohen, approved of the plan, while some other family members of American victims did not.

== Trial of al-Megrahi and Fhimah ==
There was no extradition treaty between any of the countries involved: the United Kingdom, the U.S. and Libya, and Libyan law prevented the extradition of its citizens. Libya offered to detain the two accused and prosecute them, but that offer was turned down by the U.S. and Britain. In 1994, Professor Robert Black of Edinburgh University proposed that the two Libyans could be prosecuted under Scots law but in a neutral country. Nelson Mandela offered South Africa as the neutral venue; that proposal was rejected by Britain.

In 1997, Swire and Black decided to lobby for support of Black's proposal and visited Egypt and Libya. Swire went to America, the United Nations, Germany, back to Libya and then visited cities throughout the United Kingdom. Eventually Camp Zeist, Netherlands was chosen to become Scottish territory for the duration of criminal proceedings. The accused were handed over to Scottish police at Camp Zeist in May 1999, and the trial finally began on 5 May 2000. Swire was present, and when the verdicts were announced on 31 January 2001, acquitting Fhimah and convicting Megrahi, Swire fainted and had to be carried from the courtroom.

== al-Megrahi's appeal and release ==
Swire met Abdelbaset al-Megrahi for the first time on Wednesday 16 November 2005 and spent an hour with him in the governor's office to ask Megrahi whether he would still press for the Scottish Criminal Cases Review Commission (SCCRC) to continue its review of his case if Megrahi were repatriated to Libya. Swire said Megrahi stated he would continue to pursue a review, and Swire added that UKF-103 would press for a review if Megrahi did not follow through.

On 28 June 2007, the SCCRC, after its four-year review, found that Megrahi's conviction could have been a miscarriage of justice and granted him leave for a second appeal to the Court of Criminal Appeal. Swire was interviewed on BBC Radio 4's Today Programme a few hours before the SCCRC announced its decision. Megrahi's second appeal was expected to be heard at the Court of Criminal Appeal in 2009.

In October 2007, Swire offered £500,000 (equivalent to £844,000 in 2025) to lawyers trying to prove the innocence of al-Megrahi.

In December 2008, Peter Fraser, Lord Fraser of Carmyllie, the former lord advocate, said that Swire's insistence that Al Megrahi was innocent was comparable to the "Stockholm syndrome", where captives grow to admire and defend their captors. Many American families of victims criticised Swire for his support of Libya. Swire said that he felt upset by Fraser's comments. Fraser defended his position, insisting on his choice of words.

In the same month, Swire founded the Justice for Megrahi Campaign which sought interim release from jail for Megrahi, who had been diagnosed with metastasized prostatic cancer and was terminally ill, so that he could return to his family in Libya pending his second appeal against conviction.

On 20 August 2009, owing to the cancer, Megrahi was released on compassionate grounds by the Scottish Justice Secretary, Kenny MacAskill. Application had also been made to transfer Megrahi to Libya through a prisoner transfer agreement between the UK government and Libya, though, to meet the criteria for this transfer, the conviction of a prisoner needed to be final and, ostensibly, to facilitate this, Megrahi abandoned his appeal. Swire expressed his approval of the release but disappointment that the appeal had been abandoned. In January 2012 Swire travelled to Tripoli to meet with Megrahi, before the latter died in May 2012.

== In popular culture ==
Swire was played by Colin Firth in Lockerbie: A Search for Truth, a Sky Television miniseries based on the book The Lockerbie Bombing: A Father's Search For Justice, which Swire co-authored with Peter Biddulph.
