= Gerald Gordon =

Scottish lawyer, editor and author (1929–2025)

Sir Gerald Henry Gordon CBE KC (17 June 1929 – September 2025) was a Scottish lawyer who was the editor of Scottish Criminal Case Reports and Renton and Brown's Criminal Procedure, and author of The Criminal Law of Scotland.

== Background ==
Gordon was born on 17 June 1929. He died after a short illness in September 2025, at the age of 96.

== Previous appointments ==
Gordon was a Sheriff from 1976 to 1999 and a Temporary Judge at the High Court until June 2004. He was Professor of Scots law at the University of Edinburgh from 1972 to 1976 and Head of Department of Criminal Law and Criminology there from 1965 to 1972. He practised as an Advocate from 1953 to 1959 and was Procurator Fiscal Depute from 1960 to 1965.

== SCCRC ==
Gordon was a Member of the Scottish Criminal Cases Review Commission (SCCRC) from its inception in 1999 until 2009. During this time, the SCCRC conducted a review of the conviction of Abdelbaset al-Megrahi in the Pan Am Flight 103 bombing trial.

== Honours and awards ==
Gordon was appointed a Commander of the Order of the British Empire (CBE) in the 1995 Birthday Honours and knighted in 2000. In 2002, Gordon was elected an Honorary Fellow of the Royal Society of Edinburgh.

== See also ==
- Robert Black
- The Criminal Law of Scotland ISBN 978-0-414-01399-5
