= William Nimmo Smith, Lord Nimmo Smith =

British judge

The Right Honourable Lord Nimmo Smith

Senator of the College of Justice
- In office 1996–2009
- Nominated by: John Major; As Prime Minister
- Appointed by: Elizabeth II

Personal details
- Born: William Austin Nimmo Smith; 6 November 1942 (age 83)
- Spouse: Jennifer Main
- Children: 2, including Harriet
- Education: Balliol College, Oxford; University of Edinburgh
- Profession: Judge

William Austin Nimmo Smith (6 November 1942) is a former Senator of the College of Justice, a judge of the Supreme Courts of Scotland, sitting in the High Court of Justiciary and the Inner House of the Court of Session. He retired from this position on 30 September 2009.

== Early life ==
Nimmo Smith was educated as a King's Scholar at Eton College, and studied Classics at Balliol College, University of Oxford (BA Hons 1965), and Law at the School of Law of the University of Edinburgh (LL.B. 1967). He was admitted to the Faculty of Advocates in 1969.

== Legal career ==
Nimmo Smith was appointed Standing Junior Counsel (legal advisor appointed by the Lord Advocate) to the Department of Employment in 1977, serving until 1982, at which time he took silk. From 1983 to 1986, he was an Advocate Depute, representing the Crown in prosecutions and appeals in the High Court. From 1986 to 1991, he was Chairman of the Medical Appeal Tribunals and the Vaccine Damage Tribunals, and from 1988 to 1996 was a part-time member of the Scottish Law Commission.

=== Inquiries and reports ===
In 1992, he was appointed along with James Friel, Senior Procurator Fiscal of North Strathclyde, to conduct an investigation into allegations of corruption amongst a so-called Magic Circle in the Scottish justice system, comprising homosexual members of the judiciary, legal profession and police. The allegations included liability to blackmail and giving preferential treatment, including unusually lenient sentences, to homosexual criminals. Concerns had been raised by Linlithgow MP Tam Dalyell with Lothian and Borders Chief Constable Sir William Sutherland. The Report on an Inquiry into an Allegation of a Conspiracy to Pervert the Course of Justice in Scotland was presented to the House of Lords on 26 January 1993 by Lord Advocate Lord Rodger of Earlsferry, and found no evidence of the existence of such a Magic Circle, but strongly criticised some police officers, who it said had treated rumours as fact or had been motivated by homophobia.

In 1995 he was appointed by Michael Forsyth, the Secretary of State for Scotland, to conduct a local inquiry with the terms of reference: "To inquire into the question whether Monklands District Council have failed to comply with the duty imposed on them by section 7 of the Local Government and Housing Act 1989 to make appointments to paid office or employment on merit, and to report thereon." After conducting the inquiry, which included the taking of evidence at hearings open to the public, he reported on 15 December 1995 that there was no evidence that any such appointment had been made otherwise than on merit. The Secretary of State so advised Parliament on 20 December 1995.

=== The Bench ===
Nimmo Smith was appointed a temporary judge of the Court of Session in 1995, and in 1996 was raised fully to the Bench as a Senator of the College of Justice, a judge of the Court of Session and High Court of Justiciary, Scotland's Supreme Courts, with the judicial title, Lord Nimmo Smith. Whilst a judge of the Outer House of the Court of Session, he served as the Insolvency Judge from 1997 to 2005, and as one of the Intellectual Property Judges from 1998 to 2005. He also served as a member of the Lands Valuation Appeal Court from 2002 to 2009. In 2002, he was one of five judges who heard the appeal of Abdelbaset al-Megrahi, the man convicted of the 1988 Lockerbie bombing, at the Scottish Court in the Netherlands. He was promoted to the First Division of the Inner House in 2005, at which time he was appointed a member of the Privy Council, affording him the style, The Right Honourable. As a judge of the Inner House he served as a member of the Registration Appeal Court from 2005 to 2009. He retired on 30 September 2009.

== Post-Retirement ==
After his retirement Nimmo Smith was invited by the Scottish footballing authorities to be Chairman of two inquiries into aspects of the affairs of Rangers Football Club (RFC).

In 2012 the Scottish Football Association (SFA) appointed him as Chairman of an Independent Committee to undertake certain inquiries in relation to RFC. In March 2012 the Committee reported their findings in confidence to the Board of the SFA, which on 8 March 2012 issued a press release stating that the findings had been discussed at a Special Board Meeting and had been referred to the Judicial Panel of the SFA

Also in 2012 the then Scottish Premier League (SPL) appointed Nimmo Smith to be Chairman of a Commission to inquire into certain aspects of payments made by RFC between 2000 and 2011, under its then owner (Oldco), to registered players employed by it. After various hearings the Decision of the Commission was published in February 2013. Among its findings, the Commission concluded that certain side-letter arrangements, under which these payments were made, were required to be disclosed to the SPL and the SFA; and because Oldco had decided not to make such disclosure it had been in breach of the relevant rules. The Commission accordingly fined Oldco for this breach, but because it was not established that RFC gained any unfair competitive advantage from the contraventions of the rules, nor that the non-disclosure had the effect that any of the registered players were ineligible to play, the Commission did not impose any sporting sanction or penalty on RFC.

== Personal life ==
Nimmo Smith married Jennifer Main in 1968, with whom he has a son and a daughter, the novelist Harriet Tyce. He was Chairman of the Council of the Cockburn Association from 1996 to 2001, being succeeded in this position by fellow judge Lord Macfadyen.

== Recreations ==
His published recreations are music and mountaineering. In Scotland, he has climbed all 282 Munros twice, and all 222 Corbetts once.

== See also ==
- List of Senators of the College of Justice
