= Robert Black (advocate) =

Scottish lawyer

Professor Robert Black KC FRSE FRSA
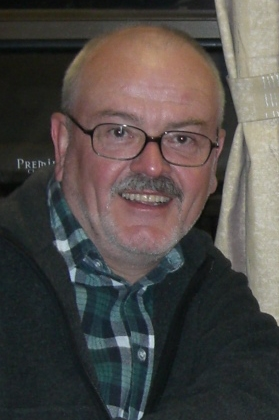

Professor of Scots Law, University of Edinburgh
- In office 1981–2004

Personal details
- Born: 12 June 1947 (age 79)
- Occupation: Advocate, legal scholar

Robert Black (born 12 June 1947) is a Scottish lawyer who is Professor Emeritus of Scots Law at the University of Edinburgh. He has been an Advocate in Scotland since 1972, was in practice at the Bar and became a QC in 1987.

== Academia ==
Robert Black was educated at Lockerbie Academy and Dumfries Academy. He graduated from the University of Edinburgh with First Class Honours in Law in 1968 and was awarded the Lord President Cooper Memorial Prize as the most distinguished graduate in that year. Thereafter he studied at McGill University in Montreal on a Commonwealth Scholarship, graduating with an LL.M. in 1970.

In January 1981, he was appointed to the Chair in Scots Law at Edinburgh until he took semi-retired status as Emeritus Professor in 2005. Thereafter, he continued part-time, teaching the Scots Law of Evidence. Between 1983 and 1999 he served as Head of the Department of Scots (later Private) Law. From 1984 to 2003, he was a member of every Dean's Council of the Faculty of Advocates (the Scottish Bar). In the 2006–7 academic session, Black retired from university teaching.

== Appointments ==
From 1981 to 1994, he served as a temporary sheriff. Over the years he has acted as the Law Society of Scotland's examiner in Evidence; as the examiner in Civil and Criminal Procedure and Pleading for solicitors seeking extended rights of audience; and as the Faculty of Advocates' examiner in Private Law.

== Publications ==
He was General Editor of The Laws of Scotland: Stair Memorial Encyclopedia (25 volumes) from 1987 to 1996. He has made extensive contributions to books and to numerous legal journal articles.

== Lockerbie bombing ==
Black has taken a close personal and professional interest in the Pan Am Flight 103 bombing of 21 December 1988, particularly because he was born and brought up in Lockerbie, Scotland. He has published a substantial number of articles on the topic in the United Kingdom and overseas. Black is often referred to as the architect of holding the non-jury Pan Am Flight 103 bombing trial at the neutral venue of Camp Zeist, Netherlands, and applying Scots Law to the Lockerbie case.

At the end of the nine-month trial, on 31 January 2001, Abdelbaset al-Megrahi was convicted of the murder of 259 passengers and crew of the aircraft, and of 11 people in the town of Lockerbie. Black reacted to the unanimous verdict of the three judges: "I thought this was a very, very weak circumstantial case. I am absolutely astounded, astonished. I was extremely reluctant to believe that any Scottish judge would convict anyone, even a Libyan, on the basis of such evidence." He warned that Megrahi stood a better-than-average chance of being acquitted on appeal.

However, Megrahi's appeal against conviction was rejected on 14 March 2002. His lawyers applied in September 2003 to the Scottish Criminal Cases Review Commission (SCCRC), but he dropped his appeal in August 2009 and, because of terminal cancer, was released from Greenock Prison on compassionate grounds and returned to Libya on 20 August 2009.

On 1 November 2007, Black was invited by Megrahi to visit him in prison. Black reported on this first meeting with Megrahi, as follows:

"As a result of today's meeting, I am satisfied that not only was there a wrongful conviction, but the victim of it was an innocent man. Lawyers, and I hope others, will appreciate this distinction."

=== Miscarriage of justice ===
Responding to remarks alleged to have been made by former Lord Advocate, Lord Fraser of Carmyllie, critical of main prosecution witness Tony Gauci, and reported in The Sunday Times of 23 October 2005, Black described the alleged remarks as "an indication that various people who have been involved in the Lockerbie prosecution are now positioning themselves in anticipation of the SCCRC holding that there was a prima facie miscarriage of justice and sending it back for a fresh appeal."

In an interview with The Scotsman on 1 November 2005, Black said Megrahi's conviction was "the most disgraceful miscarriage of justice in Scotland for 100 years." He vowed to continue his fight to have the case brought back to the appeal courts. "I have written about this and nobody is interested," Black said. "Every lawyer who has ... read the judgment says, 'This is nonsense.' It is nonsense. It really distresses me; I won't let it go."

Black feels partially to blame for Megrahi's situation: "I feel a measure of responsibility for having suggested this form of procedure and having played a part in persuading the Libyans to agree to it. And then this happens. My concern is not about his guilt or innocence, although I do believe him to be innocent. My concern is that on the evidence led at Zeist, he ought never to have been convicted." Despite widespread concerns about the potential for pre-trial publicity prejudicing a jury, Black now believes the accused may have fared better under the conventional procedure than in the non-jury trial that he formulated. Black says: "If they had been tried by an ordinary Scottish jury of 15, who were given standard instructions about how they must approach the evidence, standard instructions about reasonable doubt and what must happen if there is a reasonable doubt about the evidence, no Scottish jury could have convicted Megrahi on the evidence led at the trial."

=== Megrahi's second appeal ===
On 28 June 2007, the SCCRC announced that it had concluded its review and had referred Megrahi's case back to the Court of Criminal Appeal for a second appeal against conviction.

After a delay of over 18 months, it was announced in January 2009 that the second appeal is scheduled to start on 27 April 2009 and that the hearing could last as long as 12 months because of the complexity of the case and volume of material to be examined.

In February 2009, Black proposed a number of Scots law changes so as to expedite the Lockerbie appeal verdict.

=== Call for public inquiry ===
In September 2008, following a meeting organised by the Lockerbie Justice Group at Greshornish House on the Isle of Skye, Black and Hans Köchler called for a new public inquiry into the Lockerbie bombing. Black said:

Megrahi could go home if his appeal succeeds or if a fair appeal cannot be achieved. I am not convinced there is the political will to have the case reinvestigated, however, but one of the things we have been trying to do is to insert some backbone into those politicians who have the power to make it happen.

== Retirement ==
In 2005 Black took "semi retired" status, before retiring altogether in 2006. He asserts that he is one of a dying breed of legal academics: "Most academic lawyers, years ago, were like me – they had come up through the ranks of the practising profession. That's unusual these days. In many cases they have never advised a human being with a legal problem in their lives."

Black spends six months of the year at his second home near a remote village in the Northern Cape of South Africa.

== See also ==
- Alternative theories into the bombing of Pan Am Flight 103
- Jean-Louis Bruguière
- Gerald Gordon
- George Gretton
- Hans Köchler's Lockerbie trial observer mission
- Gerry Maher
- Neil MacCormick
- Pierre Péan
- University of Edinburgh School of Law
