= Abdul Majid Giaka =

Libyan defector and CIA asset (born 1960)

Abdul Majid Giaka (/ˈɑːbdʊl məˈdʒiːd ˈdʒaɪɑːkə/ AHB-duul mə-JEED JY-ah-kə; born 1960) is an alleged double agent who defected from Mukhabarat el-Jamahiriya (Libyan intelligence service) and became a CIA asset in August 1988.

Giaka's testimony at the Pan Am Flight 103 bombing trial in September 2000, which led to the conviction of Abdelbaset al-Megrahi of sabotaging Pan Am Flight 103 on 21 December 1988, was called into question by the Scottish Criminal Cases Review Commission in June 2007.

== Background ==
In 1984, Giaka joined the Jamahariya Security Organisation (“JSO”), later named the External Security Organisation. His initial employment was in the vehicle maintenance department for about eighteen months. In December 1985 Giaka was appointed as assistant to the station manager of Libyan Arab Airlines (LAA) at Luqa airport in Malta, a post which he alleged was normally filled by a member of the JSO.

In August 1988 Giaka contacted the US embassy in Malta, and indicated a willingness to provide them with information. He told them that he disapproved of Libyan involvement in terrorism, but the final straw was that he had been summoned back to Tripoli in connection with an incident at the airport involving an Egyptian woman. Giaka said that at that stage he wanted to go to the US, but he agreed to stay in position at Luqa airport to give information to the Americans about terrorist activities. Thereafter he had regular meetings at about monthly intervals with his CIA handlers. Eventually during 1990 he did return to Libya when the Americans stopped making payments to him. In July 1991 however he finally left Libya for Malta from where he was taken on board a US navy ship. Over a period of about three weeks he was questioned by members of the US Justice Department and provided certain information to them. Since then he has been in America on a witness protection scheme.

Giaka endeavoured from the outset to give a false impression of his importance within the JSO in the hope of persuading the CIA that he was a valuable asset who might in the future be able to provide valuable information. Thus he initially told them that when he joined the JSO he was in the secret files section, when in fact he was in vehicle maintenance; he claimed to be related to King Idris, which he was not. He also claimed that Muammar al-Gaddafi and Guido de Marco, former president of Malta, were in an international Masonic conspiracy. His continued association with the American authorities was largely motivated by financial considerations. In addition to receiving a monthly salary, initially $1000 increasing to $1500, he also persuaded the CIA to pay for sham surgery to his arm with a view to preventing the risk that he would have to do military service in Libya, and tried to persuade them to finance a car rental business which at one stage he said he wanted to set up in Malta.

== Lockerbie trial ==
Although most of Giaka's testimony at the Lockerbie trial was rejected by the court, it was his allegation that Abdelbaset al-Megrahi, one of the two Libyans indicted for the bombing, was an officer of the JSO intelligence agency which led to Megrahi's conviction. At an early meeting with the CIA in October 1988, Giaka was asked if he knew anything of weapons on Malta. He said that he was aware of eight kilos of explosives which had been stored for months at the LAA office. He understood that they had been introduced some time in 1985 when Megrahi was in Malta. They were not kept in a safe, merely in a locked drawer in the desk. He had been asked to help in transferring them to the Libyan embassy. A further report shortly thereafter indicated that they were kept in the Valletta office. In July 1991, he added the information that the other accused Libyan, Lamin Khalifah Fhimah, was the custodian of these explosives. The details of this story only emerged some two and a half years after the initial account, and contained a number of inconsistencies with the first account.

Giaka told investigators that he had seen Megrahi and Fhimah at the luggage carousel, that Fhimah collected a brown Samsonite type suitcase which he took through Customs, that then he met the two accused who were accompanied by two other people one of whom was introduced to him by the first accused as Abougela Masoud, a technician, that Vincent Vassallo (an associate of the second accused) was also present having arrived in the second accused’s new car, and that they then drove off. As other evidence established that the date of delivery of the second accused’s car was 14 December 1988, it follows that if Giaka’s story is true this incident must have occurred on 20 December 1988. He maintained that he had told his CIA handlers about this incident at the time. The respective CIA cables for this period disclose no mention of this incident at all. Furthermore, Mr Vassallo in evidence said that on 20 December 1988 he was not at the airport, and that in fact both accused came to his house that evening.

Giaka told about a conversation in about 1986 with Said Rashid, the head of the operations section of JSO, when the latter asked if it would be possible to put an unaccompanied bag on board a British aircraft. Giaka said he would investigate, and asked his assistant, Ahmed Salah, also said to be a JSO officer, if it could be done. Salah later reported that it could be done, and Abdul Majid wrote a report to Said Rashid to this effect, sending the report through his superior, the first accused. In his evidence Giaka accepted that he had never reported this to the CIA. He said that his reason for not reporting it was for personal security reasons.

The court stated in its judgement: "We are unable to accept Abdul Majid Giaka as a credible and reliable witness on any matter except his description of the organisation of the JSO and the personnel involved there."
