= Lord Sutherland =

Lord Sutherland may refer to:

- Hugh de Moravia (died c. 1219), first Lord de Sudrland (Sutherland)
- Ranald Sutherland, Lord Sutherland (1932–2025), former Scottish judge
- Stewart Sutherland, Baron Sutherland of Houndwood (1941–2018), Scottish philosopher
- Lord Ronald Charles Sutherland-Leveson-Gower (1845–1916), Scottish Liberal MP
- William de Moravia, 1st Earl of Sutherland (c. 1210–1248), Scottish clan chief
