= Tony Gauci =

Maltese court witness (1944–2016)

Tony Gauci

Tony Gauci (6 April 1944 – 29 October 2016) was the proprietor of Mary's House, a clothes shop in Sliema, Malta, who was a witness in the prosecution of Abdelbaset al-Megrahi in relation to the Lockerbie Bombing.

According to evidence given at the Pan Am Flight 103 bombing trial in 2000, Gauci sold clothing that was found among the wreckage, and determined by investigators to have been in the same suitcase as the improvised explosive device (IED) that brought the aircraft down. Gauci's account as a witness linked Libyan intelligence officer Abdelbaset al-Megrahi directly to the explosion, and was therefore important in the conviction of Megrahi on 31 January 2001. Gauci died on 29 October 2016, in Swieqi, Malta at the age of 72.

== Controversy ==
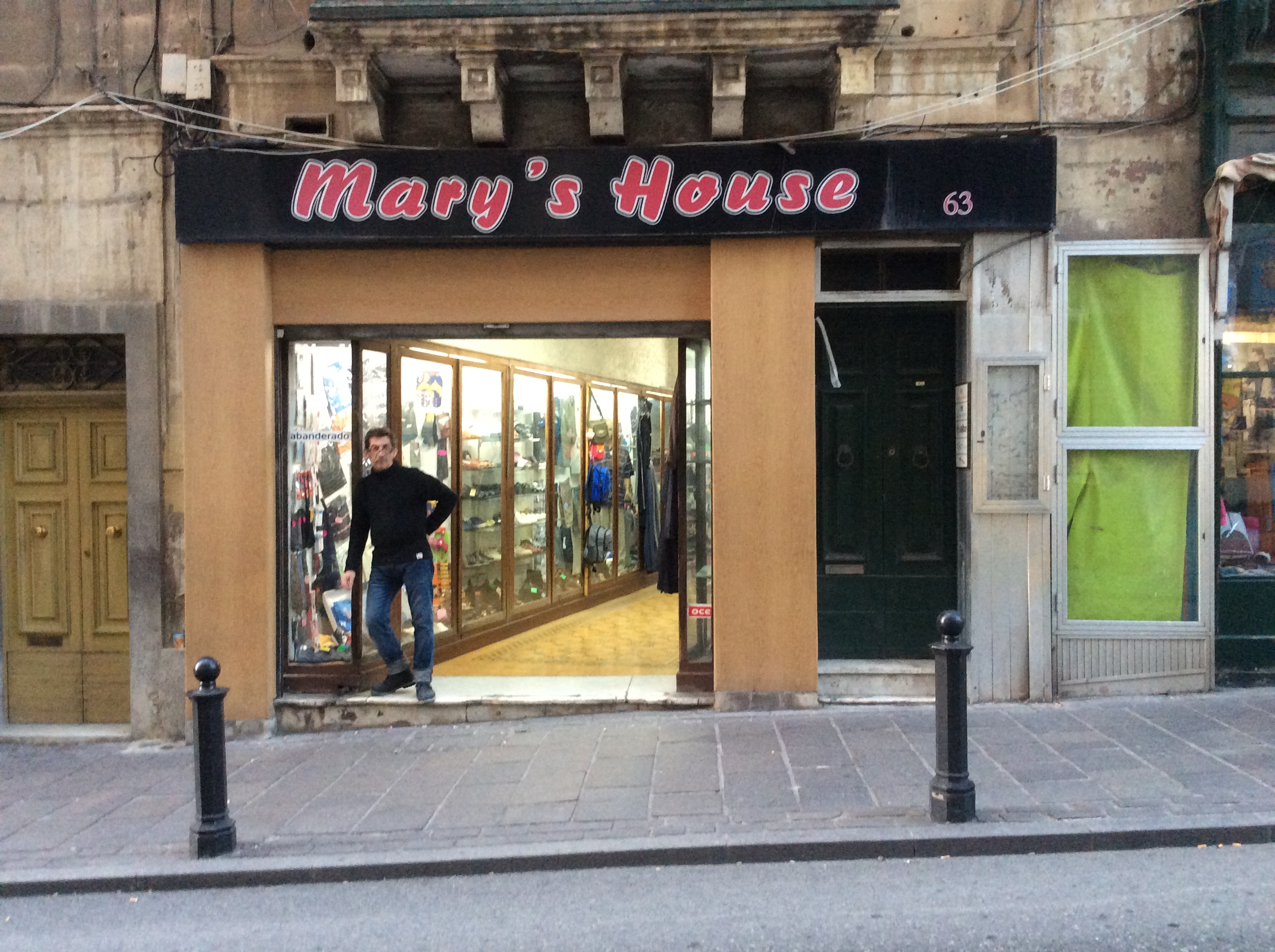
Mary's House after the reopening in 2015

At the trial, Gauci appeared uncertain about the exact date he sold the clothes in question and was not entirely sure that it was Megrahi to whom they were sold. Nonetheless, Megrahi's initial appeal against conviction was rejected by the Scottish Court in the Netherlands in March 2002. In 2007, a Scottish judicial review panel raised concerns about the trial and Gauci's testimony, including that in the days prior to picking Megrahi in a lineup, he had seen a picture of him in a magazine article on his suspected role in the bombing.

Five years after the trial, former Lord Advocate, Lord Fraser of Carmyllie, publicly described Gauci as being "an apple short of a picnic" and "not quite the full shilling".

Since Fraser had been responsible for the investigation into the bombing of Pan Am Flight 103, and for indicting Megrahi in November 1991, he was called upon to clarify his remarks about Gauci by Colin Boyd, the Lord Advocate who was chief prosecutor at the Lockerbie trial.

== SCCRC grants second appeal ==
After conducting a four-year review of the case, the Scottish Criminal Cases Review Commission (SCCRC) reported on 28 June 2007 that there may have been a miscarriage of justice in Megrahi's case, and granted him a second appeal against conviction.

The SCCRC also revealed that Gauci had been interviewed 17 times by Scottish and Maltese police, during which he gave a series of inconclusive statements. In addition, a legal source said that there was evidence that leading questions had been put to Gauci.

It was clear from the SCCRC's report that the lack of reliability of Gauci's testimony as a key prosecution witness was the main reason for the referral of Megrahi's case back to the Appeal Court. In a statement on 29 June 2007, Dr Hans Köchler, the UN-appointed international observer at the Lockerbie trial, said he shared the SCCRC's doubts about Gauci's credibility, expressed in the following extract:

"there is no reasonable basis in the trial court's judgment for its conclusion that the purchase of the items (clothes that were found in the wreckage of the plane) from Mary's House (in Malta) took place on 7 December 1988."

=== Gauci's $2 million reward ===
In October 2007, it was reported that Gauci received a $2 million reward for testifying against Megrahi at the Lockerbie trial.

In 2008, the Scottish Criminal Cases Review Commission (SCCRC Ref 23:19) found that US$2 million had been paid to Tony Gauci and US$1 million to Paul Gauci under the US Department of Justice "Rewards for Justice" programme.

The newspaper Malta Today ran an article on Gauci in May 2009 quoting Gauci's brother Paul as complaining that their lives had become "intolerable" amid growing interest by the press and repeating "the popular claim that Gauci was planning a move to Australia with his brother".

In August 2009, the BBC reported that Gauci was living in Australia.

== See also ==
- Hans Köchler's Lockerbie trial observer mission
