= Lockerbie: A Search for Truth =

British television series

- Opening title card
- Genre: Biographical drama
- Created by: David Harrower; Oskar Slingerland
- Based on: The Lockerbie Bombing: A Father's Search for Justice by: Jim Swire; Peter Biddulph
- Written by: David Harrower
- Directed by: Otto Bathurst; Jim Loach
- Starring: Colin Firth
- Country of origin: United Kingdom
- Original language: English
- No. of episodes: 5

Production
- Executive producers: Nigel Marchant; Gareth Neame; David Harrower; Liz Trubridge; Jim Sheridan; Kirsten Sheridan; Oskar Slingerland
- Producers: Colin Wratten; Brian Kaczynski
- Running time: 60 minutes
- Production companies: Carnival Films; Sky Studios; Universal International Studios

Original release
- Network: Sky Atlantic
- Release: 2 January 2025

Lockerbie: A Search for Truth is a British television drama in five-parts directed by Otto Bathurst and Jim Loach, based on the 2021 book The Lockerbie Bombing: A Father's Search for Justice by Jim Swire and Peter Biddulph. It stars Colin Firth as Swire, who embarks on a quest for justice after his daughter, Flora, dies on Pan Am Flight 103. It premiered on 2 January 2025 on Sky Atlantic and Now in the United Kingdom and Ireland, and on Peacock in the United States. Each episode's length is around 60 minutes.

== Premise ==
On 21 December 1988, Pan Am Flight 103, a transatlantic flight from London to New York City, was destroyed by a bomb 38 minutes after take-off while flying over the Scottish town of Lockerbie, killing all 243 passengers and 16 crew members. Parts of the aircraft crashed into a residential area, killing an additional 11 people. The series follows the true life story of Jim Swire and his wife Jane in their quest for justice for the victims, who included their daughter Flora.

== Cast and characters ==
- Colin Firth as Jim Swire
- Catherine McCormack as Jane Swire
- Sam Troughton as Murray Guthrie
- Mark Bonnar as Roderick McGill
- Ardalan Esmaili as Abdelbaset al-Megrahi
- Mudar Abbara as Al Amin Khalifa Fhimah
- Guy Henry as Paul Channon
- Nabil Al Raee as Colonel Gaddafi
- Jemma Carlton as Cathy Swire
- Harry Redding as William Swire
- Rosanna Adams as Flora Swire

== Episodes ==
| No. | Title | Directed by | Written by | Original release date |
|---|---|---|---|---|
| 1 | "Episode 1" | Otto Bathurst | David Harrower | 2 January 2025 |
Flora Swire, daughter to Jim Swire, boards Pan Am Flight 103 on 21 December 1988. The flight explodes over Lockerbie, killing all passengers and crew on board as well as 11 residents on the ground. The Swire family journey to Lockerbie, where a journalist reveals to Jim personally that a warning had been given to the FAA sixteen days prior to the attack but was ignored due to it being perceived a hoax. A pressure group is formed with Jim as its representative to force the UK government to launch its own independent enquiry into the attack and as to why the government did not act in regards to the warnings received. The Prime Minister later announces that an independent enquiry will not take place. Jim promises that he will himself take up an investigation on his own merit.
| 2 | "Episode 2" | Otto Bathurst | David Harrower | 2 January 2025 |
Jim Swire continues his campaign for truth and justice, two suspects – Abdelbaset al-Megrahi and Al Amin Khalifa Fhimah – are indicted for the bombing, believed to be Mukhabarat el-Jamahiriya (Libyan intelligence) agents.
| 3 | "Episode 3" | Jim Loach | David Harrower | 2 January 2025 |
Jumping forward to 2000 and the Lockerbie trial finally begins after 12 years in Utrecht, The Netherlands. Jim questions the evidence against the two suspects.
| 4 | "Episode 4" | Otto Bathurst | David Harrower | 2 January 2025 |
Convinced they have the wrong man, Jim grows closer to the convicted Abdelbaset al-Megrahi.
| 5 | "Episode 5" | Otto Bathurst | David Harrower | 2 January 2025 |
Jim starts to wonder if they will ever learn the truth.

== Production ==
The series is a co-production between Sky Studios, Peacock and Carnival Films. The development of the series was first reported in February 2022.

Executive producers include Gareth Neame and Nigel Marchant for Carnival Films, Sam Hoyle for Sky Studios and David Harrower, Liz Trubridge, Jim Sheridan, Kirsten Sheridan and Oskar Slingerland. Maryam Hamidi is an associate producer and Brian Kaczynski is a producer. It is based on Dr Jim Swire and Peter Biddulph's book The Lockerbie Bombing: A Father's Search for Justice. The book has been adapted by David Harrower. Directors include Otto Bathurst and Jim Loach.

Colin Firth was reported to be cast in January 2024 as Dr Jim Swire, who lost his daughter Flora on the plane. Colin Firth told the New York Times that in the decades following the initial, widespread shock, "fewer and fewer people cared, or even knew about, the disaster". Swire approved of Firth playing him.

Filming took place in Scotland in February 2024, in the Friars Brae area of Linlithgow.

Filming also took place at Pyramids Studios in Bathgate, Bathgate town centre and areas around Bathgate, as well as Forthside near Stirling.

== Release ==
The five-part series premiered on 2 January 2025. It was broadcast on Sky Television and streaming service Now TV in the United Kingdom and Ireland, and Peacock in the United States.

== Reception ==
The series holds a 78% "Fresh" score on review aggregator Rotten Tomatoes, based on 19 reviews with an average rating of 6.9/10. In a positive review, Nick Curtis of the London Standard wrote, "This is a thoroughly decent, even honourable attempt to remind us what the Lockerbie atrocity was, and why it matters that it remains unresolved." Conversely, Alison Rowat of The Herald wrote, "In leaving many questions unanswered the makers could be hoping that interest will be rekindled. Yet the opposite might be true. Viewers, stunned by the case’s complexities as set out here, might conclude the truth will never fully emerge."

The series was also criticised by reviewers, and families of the victims for capitalising on the events.

=== Accolades ===
The series won Best Scripted Series at the 2025 British Academy Scotland Awards, with McCormack nominated for Best Actress (film/television) and David Harrower nominated for Best Writer. Firth was nominated for Leading Actor at the British Academy Television Awards.
