= Lord Beckett =

Lord Beckett may refer to:

- Lord Cutler Beckett, a fictional character in the second and third Pirates of the Caribbean films
- John Beckett, Lord Beckett, a Senator of the College of Justice in Scotland from 2016
