= Peter Fraser, Baron Fraser of Carmyllie =

Scottish politician and advocate (1945–2013)

The Right Honourable The Lord Fraser of Carmyllie PC QC
- Fraser in 2011

Minister of State for Trade and Industry
- In office 6 July 1995 – 2 May 1997
- Prime Minister: John Major
- Preceded by: The Lord Strathclyde
- Succeeded by: The Lord Clinton-Davis

Minister of State for Scotland
- In office 14 April 1992 – 6 July 1995
- Prime Minister: John Major
- Preceded by: Michael Forsyth
- Succeeded by: James Douglas-Hamilton

Lord Advocate
- In office 4 January 1989 – 14 April 1992
- Monarch: Elizabeth II
- Prime Minister: Margaret Thatcher; John Major
- Preceded by: The Lord Cameron of Lochbroom
- Succeeded by: The Lord Rodger of Earlsferry

Solicitor General for Scotland
- In office 28 January 1982 – 4 January 1989
- Monarch: Elizabeth II
- Prime Minister: Margaret Thatcher
- Preceded by: Nicholas Fairbairn
- Succeeded by: The Lord Rodger of Earlsferry

Member of the House of Lords
- Lord Temporal
- Life peerage 10 February 1989 – 23 June 2013

Member of Parliament for East Angus South Angus (1979–1983)
- In office 3 May 1979 – 18 May 1987
- Preceded by: Andrew Welsh
- Succeeded by: Andrew Welsh

Personal details
- Born: Peter Lovat Fraser; 29 May 1945 Luanshya, Zambia
- Died: 22 June 2013 (aged 68)
- Party: Conservative
- Spouse: Fiona Macdonald Mair
- Education: Gonville & Caius College, Cambridge; Edinburgh
- Profession: Advocate

Peter Lovat Fraser, Baron Fraser of Carmyllie (29 May 1945 – 22 June 2013) was a Scottish politician and advocate who served as the Solicitor General for Scotland (1982–1989) and the Lord Advocate (1989–1992).

== Early life and family ==
He was born in Luanshya, Zambia, where his father, George Robson Fraser, served as a Church of Scotland minister. He attended preparatory school in Grahamstown, South Africa, until the age of 12, when his mother, Helen Jean Meiklejohn, died. Prime Minister Anthony Eden intervened at the request of family friend Brendan Bracken to help Fraser obtain a scholarship to Loretto School, Musselburgh, East Lothian, the private school where Eden was a trustee. He graduated with BA (Hons) and LLM (Hons) from Gonville and Caius College, Cambridge, in 1967, before completing his studies at the University of Edinburgh. He was elected to the Faculty of Advocates in 1969 and he lectured part-time in constitutional law at Heriot-Watt University from 1972 to 1974. He chaired the Scottish Conservative lawyers Reform Group in 1976. In 1979 he was appointed Standing Junior Counsel for the Foreign and Commonwealth Office and became a Queen's Counsel in 1982.

In 1969 he married Fiona Murray Mair. The couple had three children: Jane, Jamie, and Katie, as well as 8 grandchildren.

== Conservative politician ==
Fraser campaigned for British entry into the European Economic Community in 1973.

He first stood for Parliament for Aberdeen North in October 1974, but was beaten by Labour's Robert Hughes.

During the early part of his career he was Chairman of the Thistle Group, the Scottish equivalent of the Bow Group conservative think tank, where he championed devolution. In the House of Commons, he was a member of the Blue Chips dining club, which represented the left wing of the Conservative Party.

He was elected as a Conservative & Unionist Member of Parliament for South Angus in 1979, where he remained in the House of Commons until June 1987 (from 1983 representing East Angus). He was one of several prominent Conservative MPs to lose their seats in Scotland at the 1987 general election.

He was secretary of the Conservative backbench Scottish Committee (1980–1982) and Parliamentary Private Secretary to George Younger, Secretary of State for Scotland (1981–1982). In 1982 he was appointed Solicitor General for Scotland by Margaret Thatcher and became Lord Advocate in 1989. He was created a life peer as Baron Fraser of Carmyllie, of Carmyllie in the District of Angus on 10 February 1989 and was appointed a member of the Privy Council in the same year.

== Lockerbie bombing ==
During his time as Scotland's senior law officer, he was directly responsible for the conduct of the investigation into the bombing of Pan Am Flight 103. Lord Fraser drew up the 1991 indictment against the two accused Libyans and issued warrants for their arrest. But five years after the Pan Am Flight 103 bombing trial, when Abdelbaset al-Megrahi was convicted of 270 counts of murder, he cast doubt upon the reliability of the main prosecution witness, Tony Gauci. According to The Sunday Times of 23 October 2005, Lord Fraser criticised the Maltese shopkeeper, who sold Megrahi the clothing that was used to pack the bomb suitcase, for inter alia being "not quite the full shilling" and "an apple short of a picnic".

Lord Advocate, Colin Boyd, who was chief prosecutor at the Lockerbie trial, reacted by saying: "It was Lord Fraser who, as Lord Advocate, initiated the Lockerbie prosecution. At no stage, then or since, has he conveyed any reservation about any aspect of the prosecution to those who worked on the case, or to anyone in the prosecution service." Boyd asked Lord Fraser to clarify his apparent attack on Gauci by issuing a public statement of explanation.

William Taylor QC, who defended Megrahi at the trial and the appeal, said Lord Fraser should never have presented Gauci as a crown witness: "A man who has a public office, who is prosecuting in the criminal courts in Scotland, has got a duty to put forward evidence based upon people he considers to be reliable. He was prepared to advance Gauci as a witness of truth in terms of identification and, if he had these misgivings about him, they should have surfaced at the time. The fact that he is coming out many years later after my former client has been in prison for nearly four and a half years is nothing short of disgraceful. Gauci's evidence was absolutely central to the conviction and for Peter Fraser not to realise that is scandalous," Taylor said.

Tam Dalyell, former Labour MP who played a crucial role in organising the trial at Camp Zeist in the Netherlands, described Lord Fraser's comments as an 'extraordinary development': "I think there is an obligation for the chairman and members of the Scottish Criminal Cases Review Commission to ask Lord Fraser to see them and testify under oath – it's that serious. Fraser should have said this at the time and, if not then, he was under a moral obligation to do so before the trial at Zeist. I think there will be all sorts of consequences," Dalyell declared.

== Later career ==
Fraser appeared for the United Kingdom in both the European Court of Justice in Luxembourg and the European Court of Human Rights in Strasbourg.

Baron Fraser was elected President of the charity Attend (then National Association of Hospital and Community Friends) and held the position from 1989 until his passing in 2013.

He held ministerial appointments in the second government of John Major (1992–1997). From 1992 to 1995 he was Minister of State at the Scottish Office covering Home Affairs and Health. He was then Minister of State at the Department of Trade and Industry with a responsibility for export promotion and overseas investment with particular emphasis on the oil and gas industry. In 1996 he became Minister for Energy at the same department.

Under the premiership of Tony Blair (1997–2007), he was initially the shadow deputy leader of the House of Lords at the side of his friend, Lord Cranborne, but stood down when Cranborne was sacked by William Hague in December 1998 for unauthorised negotiations with the government over Lords reform.

Following his departure from government office, he became a director of multiple corporations in the energy sector, including Elf UK (1997–2005, from 2000 Total UK), JKX Oil & Gas (1997–2011), Nova Technology Corporation (1998–2013), Alkane Energy (2001–2009) and Ram Energy (since 2002). He was also a director of two futures exchanges, the London Metal Exchange (1997–2007) and the International Petroleum Exchange (1997–2013, from 2001 Intercontinental Exchange or ICE), and of the society formed to build the Carnoustie Golf Course hotel for the 1999 Open Championship. He was active through friendship societies in the Caspian region, promoting business links with Kazakhstan (as the founder of Kazlink Ltd. in 2002 and director of the British-Kazakh Society from 2003) and Azerbaijan. He served as Chairman of the Statutory Committee of the Royal Pharmaceutical Society from 2000 to 2007.

Owing to his reputation of being on the left of the Conservative Party, he retained a high profile in Scottish public life after 1998, in part through his involvement in commissions and inquiries. Among other duties, he served as an independent adviser on the Scottish Government's committee on the ministerial code.

In May 2003 he was entrusted by the First Minister Jack McConnell with heading a major public inquiry into the handling of the Scottish Parliament Building project, which had racked up a total cost of £414 million since 1999. The inquiry heard evidence from architects, civil servants, politicians and the building companies. It denounced the lack of ministerial control over "catastrophically expensive" design changes.

In August 2007 Fraser was appointed to the Scottish Broadcasting Commission established by the Scottish Executive.

He was a member of the Parliamentary Joint Committee on Human Rights and lived at Regent Terrace in Edinburgh.

Under the premiership of David Cameron (2010–2016), he served on a commission that investigated the European Court of Human Rights with a view to establishing the British Bill of Rights.

In 2013, he launched a public fundraising campaign for erecting a monument to the Polish general Stanisław Maczek in Edinburgh, which was eventually unveiled in 2018.

He died on 22 June 2013.

Parliament of the United Kingdom
Preceded by Andrew Welsh	Member of Parliament for South Angus; 1979–1983	Constituency abolished
New constituency	Member of Parliament for East Angus; 1983–1987	Succeeded by Andrew Welsh
Legal offices
Preceded by Nicholas Fairbairn	Solicitor General for Scotland; 1982–1989	Succeeded by Alan Rodger
Preceded by Lord Cameron of Lochbroom	Lord Advocate; 1989–1992	Succeeded by Lord Rodger of Earlsferry
