= John Beckett, Lord Beckett =

British lawyer

The Right Honourable Lord Beckett PC
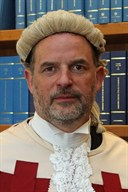

Lord Justice Clerk
- Incumbent
- Assumed office 4 February 2025
- Nominated by: John Swinney; As First Minister
- Monarch: Charles III
- Preceded by: Lady Dorrian

Senator of the College of Justice
- Incumbent
- Assumed office 17 May 2016
- Nominated by: Nicola Sturgeon; As First Minister
- Monarch: Elizabeth II

Solicitor General for Scotland
- In office 2006–2007
- Monarch: Elizabeth II
- First Minister: Jack McConnell
- Preceded by: Elish Angiolini
- Succeeded by: Frank Mulholland

Personal details
- Born: John Beckett Crawley, West Sussex
- Party: Labour
- Education: University of Edinburgh (LL.B., Dip.L.P.)
- Profession: Advocate

John Beckett, Lord Beckett is a Scottish lawyer who was appointed as Lord Justice Clerk on 4 February 2025 having served as a Senator of the College of Justice, a judge of the Court of Session, since 2016.

Beckett was Solicitor General for Scotland, the country's junior Law Officer from October 2006 to May 2007. He was appointed by Labour First Minister Jack McConnell on the appointment of former Solicitor General Elish Angiolini to the senior role of Lord Advocate. After the 2007 Scottish election, newly elected Scottish National Party First Minister Alex Salmond replaced Labour Party member Beckett with Frank Mulholland, who later became Lord Advocate. Beckett then became floating sheriff sitting mainly at Glasgow Sheriff Court.

== Early life ==
Beckett was born in Crawley, a town in West Sussex about 28 miles (45 km) south of London. His family moved to Edinburgh in 1968 and he was educated at Edinburgh Academy and Broughton High School before studying at the School of Law of the University of Edinburgh.

== Career ==
Beckett worked initially as a defence solicitor in Edinburgh, and was elected to the Faculty of Advocates in 1993. He was junior defence counsel for Abdelbaset al-Megrahi under William Taylor KC during the Lockerbie trial at the Scottish Court in the Netherlands in 2000. He became an Advocate Depute and Senior Advocate Depute in 2003, and (then) Queen's Counsel (KC) in 2005, and prosecuted the infamous murder case of baby Caleb Ness. He was appointed Principal Advocate Depute from 1 January 2006. On his appointment as Solicitor General that October, he was succeeded by Brian McConnachie.

=== Solicitor General ===
Following the resignation of Colin Boyd as Lord Advocate, Solicitor General Elish Angiolini was nominated for the post by First Minister Jack McConnell. Beckett was in turn nominated to succeed Angiolini as Solicitor General. The nomination was met with some criticism due to Beckett's membership of the Labour Party, but was ultimately approved by the Scottish Parliament on 5 October 2006. Beckett, along with Angiolini, was sworn in at the Court of Session in Edinburgh on 12 October 2006 and appointed by the Queen under the royal warrant. Beckett's appointment lasted only eight months however; the 2007 Scottish Parliament election resulted in the Scottish National Party forming a minority government, and new First Minister Alex Salmond replaced Beckett with politically neutral Frank Mulholland QC, whose appointment was approved by the Scottish Parliament without the need for a vote on 24 May 2007.

=== Sheriff ===
In April 2008, Beckett was appointed a floating sheriff, an office enabling him to sit where required throughout Scotland's six sheriffdoms, although he sat primarily in the Sheriffdom of Glasgow and Strathkelvin at Glasgow.

=== Judge ===
In May 2016, Beckett was appointed as a Senator of the College of Justice. He was installed as a judge on 17 May 2016, taking the judicial title Lord Beckett. Lord Beckett was the judge responsible for the murder trial of Emma Caldwell, where he handed Iain Packer a 36-year sentence for her murder. He was the judge in the trial of Andrew Innes where he also imposed a 36-year punishment. These sentences are the second longest in Scottish legal history (the longest being 37 years - Angus Sinclair). Beckett also presided over the trial of one of Scotland's biggest child sex abuse rings that resulted in the conviction of seven individuals, imposing orders for lifelong restriction on all seven individuals.

It was announced in June 2023 that Beckett had been appointed to the Second Division of the Inner House of the Court of Session with effect from 1 July 2023. His appointment to His Majesty's Most Honourable Privy Council was announced on 28 March 2024 as part of the 2024 Special Honours

It was announced on 31 January 2025 that Beckett had been appointed Lord Justice Clerk, succeeding Lady Dorrian. He was installed as Lord Justice Clerk on 4 February 2025.

== See also ==
- Scots law
- Courts of Scotland

Legal offices
Preceded by Elish Angiolini	Solicitor General for Scotland; 2006–2007	Succeeded by Frank Mulholland
