= Pan Am Flight 103 bombing trial =

2000 trial in the Netherlands

The Pan Am Flight 103 bombing trial began on 3 May 2000, more than 11 years after the destruction of Pan Am Flight 103 on 21 December 1988. The 36-week bench trial took place at a specially convened Scottish Court in the Netherlands set up under Scots law and held at a disused United States Air Force base called Camp Zeist near Utrecht.

== Trial set-up ==
=== Venue ===
The High Court of Justiciary at Camp Zeist, Netherlands

Upon the indictment of the two Libyan suspects in November 1991, the Libyan government was called upon to extradite them for trial in either the United Kingdom or the United States. Since no bilateral extradition treaty was in force between Libya and either of the two countries seeking extradition, Libya refused to hand the men over but did offer to detain them for trial in Libya, as long as all the incriminating evidence was provided. The offer was unacceptable to the US and UK, and there was an impasse for the next three years.

In November 1994, President Nelson Mandela offered South Africa as a neutral venue for the trial but this was rejected by the then British prime minister, John Major. A further three years elapsed until Mandela's offer was repeated to Major's successor, Tony Blair, when the president visited London in July 1997 and again at the 1997 Commonwealth Heads of Government Meeting (CHOGM) in Edinburgh in October 1997. At the latter meeting, Mandela warned that "no one nation should be complainant, prosecutor and judge" in the Lockerbie case. The eventually agreed compromise solution of a trial in the Netherlands governed by Scots law was engineered by legal academic Professor Robert Black of the University of Edinburgh and, in accordance with the Labour government's promotion of an "ethical" foreign policy, was given political impetus by the then foreign secretary, Robin Cook. The Scottish Court in the Netherlands, a special High Court of Justiciary, was set up under Scots law in a disused United States Air Force base called Camp Zeist in Utrecht, in the Netherlands. Facilities for a high security prison were also installed there. Under a bilateral treaty between the United Kingdom and the Netherlands, these premises were, for the duration of the trial and any subsequent appeal, under the authority and control of the Scottish court. Dutch law still theoretically applied to the area, but, barring an emergency, the Dutch authorities were banned from entering the premises and the court had the authority to enact regulations that superseded Dutch law when necessary for the execution of the trial, and to jail people for contempt of court. The court itself, as well as people involved in the trial also enjoyed total or partial immunity from Dutch law.

=== Accused ===
Two Libyans, Abdelbaset al-Megrahi and Lamin Khalifah Fhimah, were accused of the crime. In the run-up to the trial, the prosecution considered bringing charges against Swiss businessman, Edwin Bollier, of the electronics firm that made the timer for the bomb Mebo AG, but decided that, unless evidence to incriminate Bollier were to be introduced during the trial, he would not be included as a co-conspirator in causing the bombing.

Libya made three stipulations, when agreeing to hand over the two accused to the Scottish police: that they would not be interviewed by the police; no one else in Libya would be sought for the bombing; and, that the trial should be before three Scottish judges, sitting without a jury. On 5 April 1999, over a year ahead of the start of the trial, Megrahi and Fhimah arrived in the Netherlands.

=== Charges ===
The two accused denied all charges against them. Three outline charges were:

- murder;
- conspiracy to murder; and,
- a breach of the Aviation Security Act 1982.

The full charges included the names of the murdered 259 passengers and crew of Pan Am Flight 103, and the eleven residents killed at Lockerbie in Scotland.

=== Judges ===
The Scottish High Court of Justiciary at Camp Zeist, Netherlands was presided over by three senior judges, known as Lords Commissioners of Justiciary and an additional judge (non-voting):

- Presiding Judge: Lord Sutherland;
- Lord Coulsfield;
- Lord MacLean;

with:

- Additional judge (non-voting): Lord Abernethy.

=== Prosecution ===
Five different Lord Advocates were in post from the 1991 indictment of the two accused Libyans until their trial in 2000 – three Conservative: Lord Fraser of Carmyllie, Lord Rodger of Earlsferry, Lord Mackay of Drumadoon, and two Labour: Lord Hardie and Lord Boyd of Duncansby. Lord Boyd led the prosecution on behalf of the Crown Office. Assisting him were Advocate Deputes Alastair Campbell QC and Alan Turnbull QC. Alongside the prosecution were seated U.S. Department of Justice representatives Brian Murtagh, who had helped draw up the indictment against the two accused, and Dana Biehl.

Five years after the trial, former Lord Advocate, Lord Fraser, who issued the arrest warrants in 1991, was alleged to have said that he was not entirely happy with the evidence presented against Megrahi during his trial in 2000, and in his subsequent appeal in 2002. However, he made it clear that this did not mean that he believed Megrahi to be innocent. According to The Sunday Times of 23 October 2005, Lord Fraser allegedly cast doubt upon the reliability of the main prosecution witness, Tony Gauci.

=== Defence ===
Representing Megrahi were solicitor, Alistair Duff, and advocates William Taylor QC, David Burns QC and John Beckett. Fhimah was represented by solicitors and by advocates Richard Keen QC, Jack Davidson QC and Murdo Macleod. Both defendants also had access to Libyan defence lawyer Kamel Maghur.

== Pre-trial hearings ==
Five pre-trial hearings took place: the accused waived their right to attend two procedural hearings at the High Court in Edinburgh; they attended two hearings at Camp Zeist which were held in private; and, on 7 December 1999 they made their first public appearance before the Scottish Court in the Netherlands. At this public hearing the presiding judge, Lord Sutherland, ruled that:

- the two Libyans should face charges of conspiracy as well as murder;
- they could be described as members of their country's intelligence services; and,
- the start of the full trial was delayed by three months (from 2 February 2000).

== Case ==
The case against the two defendants rested primarily on three points:

- that the bomb timer used was from a batch sold by a Swiss firm, Mebo AG, to Libya;
- a former colleague in the Libyan Airlines office in Malta, Abdulmajid Gialka, who was due to testify that he had seen the construction of the bomb, or at least its loading onto the plane at Frankfurt;
- that the clothes identified as having been in the bomb suitcase had been bought by the defendant Megrahi at a shop in Malta.

Each of these points was contested by the defence.

- Edwin Bollier, the co-founder of the Swiss manufacturer of the timer, testified that he had sold similar timers to East Germany, and admitted having connections to a number of intelligence agencies, including both the Libyans and the CIA.
- Gialka, by the time of the trial was living under the Witness Protection Program in the US, had connections with the CIA prior to 1988, and stood to collect up to $4m in reward money following a conviction.
- Tony Gauci, the Maltese shopkeeper, failed to positively identify Megrahi in nineteen separate pre-trial statements to the police. In court, Gauci was asked five times if he recognised anyone in the courtroom, without replying. Only when the prosecutor pointed to Megrahi did Gauci say that "he resembles him". On a previous occasion Gauci had identified Abu Talb (who the defence contended was the real bomber) saying that Talb resembled the customer "a lot". Gauci's police statements identified the customer as over 6 feet tall and over 50 years of age; Megrahi is 5 feet 8 inches, and in late 1988 was 36.
- The clothes purchase took place on either 23 November or 7 December 1988; Megrahi was only in Malta on 7 December. Gauci recalled the customer also buying an umbrella due to the rain. The defence argued, using meteorological records, that it rained all day on 23 November, but only briefly or not at all on 7 December.

In its closing arguments, the prosecution stressed that Megrahi could not have planted the bomb without the assistance of Fhimah – both defendants were equally guilty, and should stand or fall together.

== Proceedings (May 2000 – January 2001) ==
Court proceedings started on 3 May 2000 with the prosecution outlining the case against the accused and previewing the evidence which they expected would satisfy the judges beyond reasonable doubt that the sabotage of PA 103 was caused by:

- the explosion of an improvised explosive device (IED);
- an IED that was contained within a Toshiba radio cassette player in a hard-shell Samsonite suitcase along with various items of clothing which had been bought in Mary's House, Sliema, Malta;
- an IED triggered by the use of an MST-13 timer, manufactured by Mebo Ag in Switzerland; and,
- the so-called primary suitcase being introduced as unaccompanied baggage at Luqa Airport in Malta, conveyed by Air Malta flight KM180 to Frankfurt International Airport, transferred there onto feeder flight PA 103A to Heathrow Airport, loaded into the interline baggage container AVE 4041PA at Heathrow, and put on board PA 103 in the forward cargo hold.

In the trial's second week, Detective Constable Gilchrist was asked about the piece of charred material that he and DC McColm had found three weeks after the PA 103 crash. DC Gilchrist attached a label to the material and wrote "Cloth (charred)" on it. The word 'cloth' was overwritten by the word 'debris'. DC Gilchrist's attempts to explain the overwriting were later described by the judges as "at worst evasive and at best confusing."

There was no third week and, because of equipment problems in the courtroom, only a truncated fourth week. In week 5, Professor Peel of the Defence Evaluation and Research Agency (DERA) gave evidence concerning the baggage container AVE 4041PA.

Week 6 was devoted to the testimony behind screens of CIA agents and Bureau of Alcohol, Tobacco and Firearms officers relating to interception of arms caches (including MST-13 timers) in the West African countries of Senegal and Togo.

In week 7 Alan Feraday, also of DERA, gave evidence. Feraday presented the court with a simulated IED of the type alleged to have caused the sabotage of PA 103. Under cross-examination, he admitted the fragments of radio cassette and timer, found in DC Gilchrist's cloth/debris (charred) material, had not been tested for explosives residue. The defence were, however, later criticized for having failed to challenge Feraday to explain why his note to Detective Chief Inspector William Williamson in September 1989, covering a Polaroid photograph of the timer fragment (identified in May 1989), said it was "the best I can do in such a short time."

Later in week 7, the co-founder of Mebo AG, Erwin Meister, testified that Mebo had supplied Libya with 20 MST-13 timing devices, and identified one of the two accused (Megrahi) as a former business contact. The defence asked Meister, under cross-examination, to explain the purpose of his visit to Syria in 1984.

Meister's partner, Edwin Bollier, was questioned in week 8. Bollier said Mebo made a range of products including briefcases equipped to radio-detonate IEDs. He agreed that Mebo had sold 20 MST-13 timers to Libya in 1985 which were later tested by Libyan special forces at their base at Sabha. Bollier said: "I was present when two such timers were included in bomb cylinders". In court, Bollier was shown a number of printed circuit board fragments which he identified as coming from the Mebo MST-13 timer, but he claimed that these timer fragments appeared to have been modified.

Joachim Wenzel, an employee of the Stasi, the former East German intelligence agency, testified behind screens in week 9. Wenzel claimed to have been Bollier's handler in the years 1982–85 and testified that Mebo had supplied the Stasi with timers.

Former Mebo employee, Ulrich Lumpert, confirmed that as an electronics engineer he had produced all of the firm's MST-13 timers. Lumpert agreed that the fragments shown to him in court "could be" from that timer and was asked to confirm his signature on a letter concerning a technical fault with the prototype MST-13 timer. The trial was then adjourned until 12 July 2000.

On 18 July 2007 Lumpert admitted he had lied at the trial. In an affidavit before a Zürich notary, Lumpert stated that he had stolen a prototype MST-13 timer PC-board from Mebo and gave it without permission on 22 June 1989, to "an official person investigating the Lockerbie case". Dr Hans Köchler, UN observer at the Lockerbie trial, who was sent a copy of Lumpert's affidavit, said: "The Scottish authorities are now obliged to investigate this situation. Not only has Mr Lumpert admitted to stealing a sample of the timer, but to the fact he gave it to an official and then lied in court".

In week 11, Mebo lawyer Dieter Neupert filed an official criminal complaint against the Crown over what he alleged was a 'forged fragment of MST-13 timer'. Tony Gauci of Mary's House, Sliema in Malta, testified that he had sold a number of items of clothing to one of the defendants, Megrahi. Wilfred Borg, Ground Operations Manager at Malta's Luqa airport, was questioned about Luqa's baggage handling procedures. A Mr Ferrugia confirmed that he had been a passenger on Air Malta flight KM 180 to Frankfurt on 21 December 1988.

Two Germans, Birgit Seliger and Evelin Steinwandt, confirmed in week 12 that they had also travelled on flight KM 180. Martin Huebner and Joachim Koscha were questioned about baggage handling procedures at Frankfurt airport.

Five more passengers on flight KM 180 testified in week 13. The captain of flight KM 180, Khalil Lahoud, also gave evidence and was asked to confirm that the aircraft's altitude during the flight had exceeded 30,000 ft. This information was intended to demonstrate that an IED loaded at Luqa airport would have had a timed detonator rather than a barometric trigger. The trial was then adjourned until 22 August 2000.

In week 17, another four passengers on flight KM 180 were asked to testify. The following week, Abdul Majid Giaka, a defector from the Libyan intelligence service, appeared wearing sunglasses and a wig. Giaka, who had been on the US Witness Protection Program since July 1991, testified that Megrahi was a Libyan agent.

Rather than calling the defendants to the witness stand, their legal team sought to use the special defence of incrimination against the person or persons they believed were guilty of the crime. There was speculation that Mohammed Abu Talb, a convicted PFLP-GC member, would be called by the defence to testify in week 19, and when he failed to appear the trial was adjourned for the next five weeks to allow new evidence from a "country in the Mid East" to be examined.

One of the last witnesses for the prosecution was broadcaster and politician, Pierre Salinger, who was questioned by prosecutor Alan Turnbull and by both defence counsel William Taylor and Richard Keen. After his testimony, judge Lord Sutherland asked Salinger to leave the witness box. However, the broadcaster responded:

"That's all? You're not letting me tell the truth. Wait a minute, I know exactly who did it. I know how it was done."

But Lord Sutherland told Salinger:

"If you wish to make a point you may do so elsewhere, but I'm afraid you may not do so in this court."

Abu Talb gave evidence in week 25 and testified that he had been babysitting at home in Sweden when PA 103 was sabotaged on 21 December 1988.

The Crown concluded the prosecution case in week 26. In its closing address for Fhimah in weeks 26 and 27, the defence submitted there was no case for him to answer. There were no weeks 28 to 32.

The expected documents from the "country in the Mid East" – thought to be Syria – had not materialized by week 33, and the defence confirmed that the accused would not take the witness stand. The prosecution dropped two of the three charges against the accused, leaving the single charge of murder against both Megrahi and Fhimah. The defence claimed the accused had no case to answer.

In week 34 the defence argued that the IED started its journey at Heathrow, rather than Luqa airport in Malta. The judges then retired to consider their verdict.

There was no week 35. The judges announced their verdict on 31 January 2001 in week 36.

== Verdicts (January 2001) ==
In addition to the options of guilty and not guilty, a third verdict of not proven was available to the judges under Scots Law. The judges announced their verdicts on 31 January 2001.

The judgement stated:

"From the evidence which we have discussed so far, we are satisfied that it has been proved that the primary suitcase containing the explosive device was dispatched from Malta, passed through Frankfurt and was loaded onto PA103 at Heathrow. It is, as we have said, clear that with one exception the clothing in the primary suitcase was the clothing purchased in Mr Gauci’s shop on 7 December 1988. The purchaser was, on Mr Gauci’s evidence, a Libyan. The trigger for the explosion was an MST-13 timer of the single solder mask variety. A substantial quantity of such timers had been supplied to Libya.

We cannot say that it is impossible that the clothing might have been taken from Malta, united somewhere with a timer from some source other than Libya and introduced into the airline baggage system at Frankfurt or Heathrow. When, however, the evidence regarding the clothing, the purchaser and the timer is taken with the evidence that an unaccompanied bag was taken from KM180 to PA103A, the inference that that was the primary suitcase becomes, in our view, irresistible. As we have also said, the absence of an explanation as to how the suitcase was taken into the system at Luqa is a major difficulty for the Crown case but after taking full account of that difficulty, we remain of the view that the primary suitcase began its journey at Luqa. The clear inference which we draw from this evidence is that the conception, planning and execution of the plot which led to the planting of the explosive device was of Libyan origin.

While no doubt organisations such as the PFLP-GC and the PPSF were also engaged in terrorist activities during the same period, we are satisfied that there was no evidence from which we could infer that they were involved in this particular act of terrorism, and the evidence relating to their activities does not create a reasonable doubt in our minds about the Libyan origin of this crime."

The judges were unanimous in finding the second accused, Lamin Khalifah Fhimah, not guilty of the murder charge. Fhimah was freed and he returned to his home at Souk al-Juma in Libya on 1 February 2001. As for Abdelbaset al-Megrahi the judges said: "There is nothing in the evidence which leaves us with any reasonable doubt as to the guilt of the first accused, and accordingly we find him guilty of the remaining charge in the indictment as amended."

Megrahi was sentenced to life imprisonment, with a recommendation that he should serve at least 20 years before being eligible for parole.

== Appeal (January 2001 – March 2002) ==
The defence team had 14 days in which to appeal against Megrahi's conviction on 31 January 2001, and a further six weeks to submit the full grounds of the appeal. These were considered by a judge sitting in private who decided to grant Megrahi leave to appeal. The only basis for an appeal under Scots law is that there has been a "miscarriage of justice" which is not defined in statute and so it is for the appeal court to determine the meaning of these words in each case. Because three judges and one alternate judge had presided over the trial, five judges were required to preside over the Court of Criminal Appeal:

- Lord Cullen, Lord Justice-General
- Lord Kirkwood
- Lord Osborne
- Lord Macfadyen and
- Lord Nimmo Smith

In what was described as a milestone in Scottish legal history, Lord Cullen granted the BBC permission in January 2002 to televise the appeal, and to broadcast it on the Internet in English with a simultaneous Arabic translation.

William Taylor QC, leading the defence, said at the appeal's opening on 23 January 2002 that the three trial judges sitting without a jury had failed to see the relevance of "significant" evidence and had accepted unreliable facts. He argued that the verdict was not one that a reasonable jury in an ordinary trial could have reached if it were given proper directions by the judge. The grounds of the appeal rested on two areas of evidence where the defence claimed the original court was mistaken: the evidence of Maltese shopkeeper, Tony Gauci, which the judges accepted as sufficient to prove that the "primary suitcase" started its journey in Malta; and, disputing the prosecution's case, fresh evidence would be adduced to show that the bomb's journey actually started at Heathrow. That evidence, which was not heard at the trial, showed that at some time in the two hours before 00:35 on 21 December 1988 a padlock had been forced on a secure door giving access air-side in Terminal 3 of Heathrow airport, near to the area referred to at the trial as the "baggage build-up area". Taylor claimed that the PA 103 bomb could have been planted then.

On 14 March 2002 it took Lord Cullen less than three minutes to deliver the decision of the High Court of Justiciary. The five judges rejected the appeal, ruling unanimously that "none of the grounds of appeal was well-founded", adding "this brings proceedings to an end". The following day, a helicopter took Megrahi from Camp Zeist to continue his life sentence in Barlinnie Prison, Glasgow.

== SCCRC review (September 2003 – June 2007) ==
The Scottish Criminal Cases Review Commission (SCCRC), which was established by Act of Parliament in April 1999, has wide-ranging powers to investigate cases where a miscarriage of justice is alleged, and reviewed Megrahi's case from September 2003. Although the Commission normally expects to review a case and announce its decision within 12 months, it took nearly four years to complete the Megrahi review. On 28 June 2007 the SCCRC published a summary of its 800-page report and referred Megrahi's conviction to the Court of Criminal Appeal for a fresh appeal. The SCCRC's findings were examined in detail by Al Jazeera in two episodes of the network's People & Power series in July 2007.

== Second appeal (2007–2009) ==
The second appeal was to have been heard by five Scottish judges in 2009 at the Court of Criminal Appeal. A procedural hearing at the Appeal Court in Edinburgh took place on 11 October 2007 when prosecution lawyers and Megrahi's defence Counsel, Maggie Scott QC, discussed legal issues with a panel of three judges. One of the issues concerns a number of CIA documents that were shown to the prosecution but were not disclosed to the defence. The documents are understood to relate to the Mebo MST-13 timer that allegedly detonated the PA103 bomb. Further procedural hearings were scheduled to take place between December 2007 and June 2008.

Pointing out an error on the FCO's website and accusing the British government of "delaying tactics" in relation to Megrahi's second Lockerbie appeal, UN Observer at the Lockerbie trial, Hans Köchler, wrote to Foreign Secretary David Miliband on 21 July 2008 saying:

As international observer, appointed by the United Nations, at the Scottish Court in the Netherlands I am also concerned about the Public Interest Immunity (PII) certificate which has been issued by you in connection with the new Appeal of the convicted Libyan national. Withholding of evidence from the Defence was one of the reasons why the Scottish Criminal Cases Review Commission has referred Mr. Al-Megrahi’s case back to the High Court of Justiciary. The Appeal cannot go ahead if the Government of the United Kingdom, through the PII certificate issued by you, denies the Defence the right (also guaranteed under the European Convention on Human Rights) to have access to a document which is in the possession of the Prosecution. How can there be equality of arms in such a situation? How can the independence of the judiciary be upheld if the executive power interferes into the appeal process in such a way?

The FCO corrected the error on its website and wrote to Köchler on 27 August 2008:

"Ultimately, it will be for the Court to decide whether the material should be disclosed, not the Foreign Secretary."

In September 2008, following an application made at a closed hearing of the Appeal Court in Edinburgh, it was reported that a security-vetted Defence Counsel is to be appointed to examine the disputed document. The court's decision on the application has not been published but in a letter seen by BBC Scotland, FCO minister Kim Howells says it has decided to appoint a special defender. In a BBC interview, Hans Köchler criticised the development as "intolerable" and "detrimental to the rule of law." Köchler said:

"In no country can the situation be allowed where the accused or the appellant is not free to have his own defence team, and instead someone is imposed upon him."

On 15 October 2008, five Scottish judges decided unanimously to reject a submission by the Crown Office that the scope of Megrahi's second appeal should be limited to the specific grounds of appeal that were identified by the SCCRC in June 2007. On 21 October 2008 Megrahi's lawyer, revealed that his client had been diagnosed with "advanced stage" prostate cancer. Despite the appeals of Jim Swire, that keeping Megrahi behind bars while he battled the disease "would amount to exquisite torture", the High Court ruled on 14 November 2008 that Megrahi should remain in jail while his appeal continued. In an article published on 29 December 2008 award-winning journalist and author, Hugh Miles, described the Lockerbie trial as an historic miscarriage of justice. The article concluded: "If Megrahi didn't do it, who did?" On 31 December 2008, Dr L. De Braeckeleer ended a 174-part series entitled Diary of a Vengeance Foretold. The article alleges that Iran ordered the bombing of Pan Am 103 in revenge for the downing of Iran Air Flight 655.

In January 2009, it was reported that, although Megrahi's second appeal against conviction was scheduled to begin on 27 April 2009, the hearing could last as long as 12 months because of the complexity of the case and volume of material to be examined.

On 18 August 2009, Megrahi dropped his appeal in light of his terminal prostate cancer.

== Release and death of Megrahi (2009–2012) ==
On 20 August 2009, Scotland's Justice Minister, Kenny MacAskill, announced the release of Megrahi under terms of Scottish laws permitting the early release on compassionate grounds of prisoners with terminal illnesses. He had terminal prostate cancer. After his release from Greenock Prison in Scotland, Megrahi travelled in a white police van flanked by police cars to Glasgow Airport, where he boarded a special flight from Libya's Afriqiyah Airways. Megrahi flew home to Tripoli, Libya, accompanied by Saif al-Islam Gaddafi, son of the Libyan leader, Muammar Gaddafi and to a hero's welcome. He died in 2012. In May 2014 a group of relatives of the Lockerbie victims continued to campaign for al-Megrahi's name to be cleared by reopening the case.

In December 2014 the Lord Advocate, Frank Mulholland, said no Crown Office investigator or prosecutor had ever raised concerns about the evidence used to convict Megrahi. He also pledged to continue to track down Megrahi's accomplices.

== Views ==
=== Views of Jim Swire ===
Jim Swire, whose daughter Flora was killed in the bombing, and who has been a spokesman for UK Families Flight 103, which represented British relatives, has stated that he believes Megrahi is innocent. Swire is also concerned by comments attributed to the former lord advocate Lord Fraser, which appeared to doubt the credibility of a key prosecution witness, Tony Gauci.

Swire has stated that "the scandal around Megrahi is not that a sick man was released, but that he was ever convicted in the first place. All I have ever wanted is to see the people who murdered my daughter are brought to justice."

=== Law Professor Robert Black ===
Professor Robert Black of the University of Edinburgh, one of Scotland's top legal experts and the person who devised the non-jury trial that saw the Lockerbie case heard in 2000, has called al-Megrahi's murder conviction "the most disgraceful miscarriage of justice in Scotland for 100 years". Prof. Black said he felt "a measure of personal responsibility" for persuading Libya to allow Megrahi and his co-accused, Al-Amin Khalifa Fhima, who was acquitted, to stand trial under Scots law.

I have written about this and nobody is interested..Every lawyer who has ... read the judgment says 'this is nonsense'. It is nonsense. It really distresses me; I won't let it go.

In 2007 Prof. Black has written that he is "satisfied that not only was there a wrongful conviction [of al-Megrahi], but the victim of it was an innocent man. Lawyers, and I hope others, will appreciate this distinction."

In August 2011, Black claimed that the three judges at the trial of the Lockerbie bomber reached a guilty verdict "contrary to the evidence" because, "consciously or subconsciously", they were under pressure to convict from the then Lord Advocate (Scotland's leading legal official), Lord Boyd of Duncansby. Lord Boyd declared the allegations "ludicrous".

=== Remarks by Lord Fraser ===
The Sunday Times of 23 October 2005 reported that Lord Fraser of Carmyllie, who drew up the 1991 indictment against the two accused Libyans and issued warrants for their arrest, had now cast doubt upon the reliability of the main prosecution witness, Tony Gauci. Lord Fraser criticised the Maltese shopkeeper for inter alia being "not quite the full shilling" and an "apple short of a picnic".

The then Lord Advocate, Lord Boyd, reacted to the remarks, as follows:

"It was Lord Fraser who, as Lord Advocate, initiated the Lockerbie prosecution. At no stage, then or since, has he conveyed any reservation about any aspect of the prosecution to those who worked on the case, or to anyone in the prosecution service."

Lord Boyd has asked Lord Fraser to clarify his apparent attack on Gauci by issuing a public statement of explanation.

William Taylor QC, who defended Megrahi at the trial and the appeal, said Lord Fraser should never have presented Gauci as a crown witness:

"A man who has a public office, who is prosecuting in the criminal courts in Scotland, has got a duty to put forward evidence based upon people he considers to be reliable. He was prepared to advance Gauci as a witness of truth in terms of identification and, if he had these misgivings about him, they should have surfaced at the time. The fact that he is coming out many years later after my former client has been in prison for nearly four and a half years is nothing short of disgraceful. Gauci's evidence was absolutely central to the conviction and for Peter Fraser not to realise that is scandalous," Taylor said.

Tam Dalyell, former Labour MP who played a crucial role in organising the trial at Camp Zeist in the Netherlands, described Lord Fraser's remarks as an 'extraordinary development':

"I think there is an obligation for the chairman and members of the Scottish Criminal Cases Review Commission to ask Lord Fraser to see them and testify under oath – it's that serious. Fraser should have said this at the time and, if not then, he was under a moral obligation to do so before the trial at Zeist. I think there will be all sorts of consequences," Dalyell declared.

Gerard Sinclair, chief executive of the SCCRC, refused to say whether the commission was investigating Lord Fraser's reported remarks. "Any investigation we carry out we seek to do so as rigorously and as thoroughly as possible," he said.

Robert Black, Professor Emeritus of Scots Law at the University of Edinburgh and a Lockerbie expert, described the alleged remarks as "an indication that various people who have been involved in the Lockerbie prosecution are now positioning themselves in anticipation of the SCCRC holding that there was a prima facie miscarriage of justice, and sending it back for a fresh appeal."

=== UN observer ===
Professor Hans Köchler, who was appointed as one of the UN observers by UN Secretary-General Kofi Annan, criticised the trial in his report and evaluation. Köchler observed that the trial had been politically influenced in breach of legal traditions and principles, such as the rule of law. In an interview for the BBC on the day the first appeal was rejected, he described the court's decision as a "spectacular miscarriage of justice".

In a radio programme entitled Politics and justice: the Lockerbie trial, which was broadcast on 9 September 2007 by Australia's ABC Radio National, Köchler, Robert Black and Jim Swire expressed their views on the Lockerbie trial and the first appeal, and suggested what should happen next.

In the June 2008 edition of the Scottish lawyers' magazine The Firm, Köchler referred to the 'totalitarian' nature of the ongoing second Lockerbie appeal process saying it "bears the hallmarks of an 'intelligence operation'."

== Statistics ==
Some general statistics:

- there were 84 court days (between 3 May 2000 and 31 January 2001)
- 230 witnesses gave evidence
- the Crown listed 1160 witnesses and called 227
- the defence listed 121 and called 3
- witnesses came from the UK, US, Libya, Japan, Germany, Malta, Switzerland, Slovenia, Sweden, the Czech Republic, India, France and Singapore
- languages translated in court were Arabic, French, Czech, Japanese, Swedish, Maltese and German
- there were 1867 documentary reproductions and 621 label productions (or exhibits – the largest of which was an aircraft reconstruction)
- the aircraft reconstruction was the only one not conveyed to court (it remained at the Air Accident Investigations Branch premises at Farnborough in England)
- there were 10,232 pages of court transcripts covering more than three million words
- the cost of the trial itself was estimated at £60m
- the running costs of the appeal were put at about £2m per month, which combined to produce a total bill of £75m, as estimated by the Scottish Executive
- 20% of the running costs were met by Scotland's Justice Department
- 80% of the running costs along with capital expenditure were borne by the UK government
- the US government made a substantial contribution towards the extra costs of holding the trial in the Netherlands
- the creation of the special court and prison complex at Camp Zeist cost £12m
- original estimates for the entire proceedings were put at £150m (or double the actual spend)
- compensation of £4.5 million ($8 million) was paid in August 2003 by Libya to each family of the 270 victims: a total of £1.23 billion ($2.16 billion)
- contingency fees of £1.4 million ($2.5 million) were deducted from each family's compensation payment, and were retained by the US law firms involved: a total of £385 million ($675 million) in legal fees

== See also ==
- Pan Am Flight 103
- Pan Am Flight 103 conspiracy theories
- Investigation into the bombing of Pan Am Flight 103
- Libya and state-sponsored terrorism
- Scottish Criminal Cases Review Commission
- Hans Köchler's Lockerbie trial observer mission
- LOT Flight 165 hijacking trial, another trial by judges from a judiciary other than the host nation

== Sources ==
- Transcript of Trial (Linked PDF document no longer available.)
- Scottish Courts site with Verdict and Appeal documents
- Scottish Criminal Cases Review Commission
- Scottish Criminal Cases Review Commission news release on Abdelbaset Ali Mohmed Al Megrahi 28 June 2007
- Criminal complaint regarding the falsification of evidence in the Lockerbie case
- Lockerbie trial website: full week-by-week coverage
