= Ranald Sutherland, Lord Sutherland =

Scottish judge (1932–2025)

Ranald Iain Sutherland, Lord Sutherland (23 January 1932 – 26 February 2025) was a Scottish judge who was a Senator of the College of Justice, having been appointed in 1985. Known as Lord Sutherland in the Court of Session and High Court of Justiciary, he sat in the First Division of the Inner House of the Court of Session.

His most notable case was as a presiding judge in the Pan Am Flight 103 bombing trial.

Sutherland was married to Janice, and they had two sons, Alan and Donald. He died on 26 February 2025, at the age of 93.

== Brief Biography ==
- Graduated from the University of Edinburgh (MA LLB) and was admitted to the Faculty of Advocates in 1956.
- Served as an Advocate Depute from 1962 to 1964 and again from 1971 to 1977.
- Appointed Standing Junior Counsel to the Ministry of Defence from 1964 to 1969.
- Appointed Queen's Counsel (QC) in 1969.
- Member of the Criminal Injuries Compensation Board from 1977 to 1985
- Scottish Representative to the International Association of Judges.
