= William Taylor (lawyer) =

Scottish advocate

William Taylor, KC has been a Scottish advocate since 1971 and now KC (then QC before 2022) since 1986. He has also been a barrister in England and Wales since 1990 and a Queen's Counsel there since 1998. He has specialised in criminal defence work since the 1980s.

== Personal life ==
William Taylor was born in Aberdeenshire, and attended Robert Gordon's College public school (formerly for boys) after winning a scholarship based on academic achievement. Taylor gained his first degree from the University of Aberdeen, an Honours in Philosophy where he followed on to complete studies in Criminal Law.

Taylor is historically notable as being the first (then Queen's Counsellor) to hold the 'KC' position in both Scotland and England.

== Lockerbie trial ==
William Taylor KC acted as senior counsel for Abdelbaset al-Megrahi during the Pan Am Flight 103 bombing trial from May 2000 to January 2001, and during the subsequent appeal in January to March 2002.

== SCCRC ==
Taylor was reappointed Commissioner at the Scottish Criminal Cases Review Commission by Royal Warrant from 1 January 2002 for a further fixed term of four years expiring on 31 December 2005. However, he undertook to resign immediately from the SCCRC if his former client Megrahi were to apply to the Commission for a review of the case. Megrahi applied on 23 September 2003 and Taylor duly resigned on the same day. In a tribute to one of the founding Commissioners, the SCCRC chairman said: "The Commission greatly values the service which Mr Taylor has given to the Commission over the past four years. I understand and appreciate Mr Taylor's position in deciding to take this course of action."

== Lord Fraser's remarks ==
As reported in The Sunday Times of 23 October 2005, the former Lord Advocate Lord Fraser of Carmyllie, who initiated the Lockerbie prosecution, said of the main prosecution witness at the Lockerbie trial, Tony Gauci:

"Gauci was not quite the full shilling. I think even his family would say (that he) was an apple short of a picnic. He was quite a tricky guy. I don't think he was deliberately lying but if you asked him the same question three times he would just get irritated and refuse to answer."

Fraser added:

"I wasn't particularly impressed with his (Abdelbaset al-Megrahi) defence: their techniques of muddle and confusion can work for a jury but it doesn't work for three judges."

Asked for his reaction, William Taylor said Fraser should never have presented Gauci as a Crown witness:

"A man who has a public office, who is prosecuting in the criminal courts in Scotland, has got a duty to put forward evidence based upon people he considers to be reliable. He was prepared to advance Gauci as a witness of truth in terms of identification and, if he had these misgivings about him, they should have surfaced at the time. The fact that he is coming out many years later after my former client has been in prison for nearly four and a half years is nothing short of disgraceful. Gauci's evidence was absolutely central to the conviction and for Peter Fraser not to realise that is scandalous."

== See also ==
- Hans Köchler's Lockerbie trial observer mission
- Pan Am Flight 103 bombing trial
