= Donald Macfadyen, Lord Macfadyen =

Scottish lawyer and judge

Donald James Dobbie Macfadyen, Lord Macfadyen QC (8 September 1945 – 11 April 2008) was a highly regarded Scottish lawyer who served as a judge for over a decade. In 2002, he was one of the five judges who heard the appeal of Abdelbaset al-Megrahi against his conviction for the bombing in 1998 of Pan Am Flight 103.

== Life ==
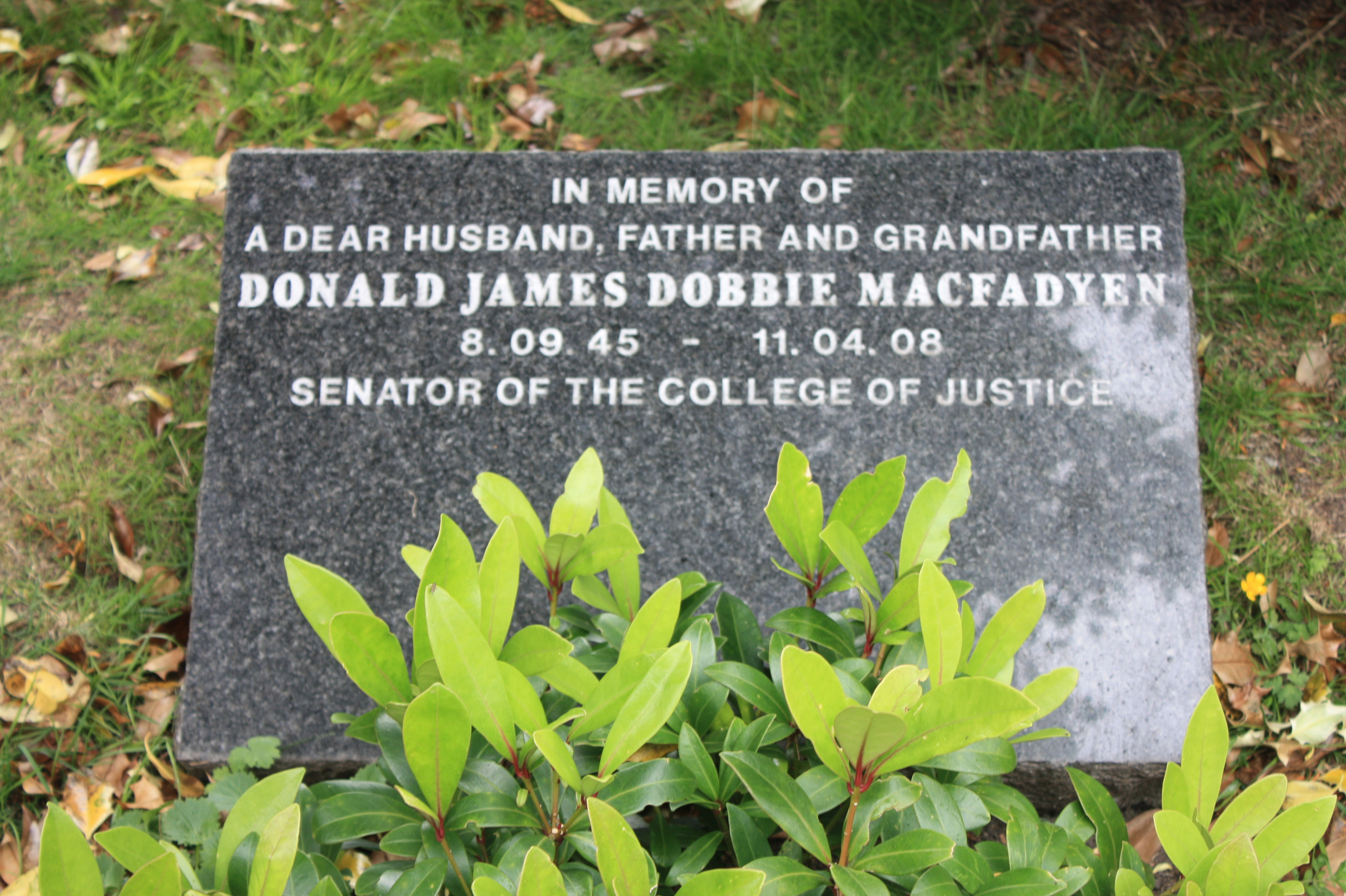
The grave of Donald Macfadyen, Dean Cemetery, Edinburgh

Macfadyen was born in Glasgow, to Donald and Christina Macfadyen. He was educated at Hutchesons' Boys Grammar School and then at Glasgow University, where he won many prizes and graduated in law in 1967.

In 1969, Macfadyen was admitted to the Faculty of Advocates, at the unusually young age of 23. He was an advocate depute (prosecutor) from 1979 to 1982, and was standing junior counsel to the Department of Agriculture and Fisheries for Scotland from 1977 to 1979 and to the Scottish Home and Health Department from 1982 to 1983.

Macfadyen became a Queen's Counsel in 1983, aged only 38. From 1989 to 1995 he was a part-time chairman of Medical Appeal Tribunals and Vaccine Damage Tribunals.

From 1991 to 1992 he was counsel to the inquiry into the Orkney child abuse scandal, when children had been removed from their parents following allegations of ritualistic abuse. This high-profile cases established his reputation, and from 1992 to 1995 he was vice-dean of the Faculty of Advocates.

He died on 11 April 2008. His ashes are buried in Dean Cemetery in western Edinburgh, slightly north of the main entrance, facing the eastern path.

== Judge ==
In 1994 Macfadyen one of the first people to be appointed a temporary judge of the Court of Session. In 1995 his promotion was made permanent, when he was appointed as a Senator of the College of Justice.

Inner House in 2002
