= Lamin Khalifah Fhimah =

Libyan accused of the Lockerbie bombing (1956–2026)

- الأمين خليفة فحيمة
- Fhimah in 1988
- Born: 4 April 1956; Souq al Jum'aa, Tripoli, Kingdom of Libya
- Died: 25 August 2026 (aged 70)
- Occupations: Station manager, Libyan Arab Airlines, Luqa Airport, Malta
- Children: Five

Lamin Khalifah Fhimah (Arabic: الأمين خليفة فحيمة, al-Amīn Khalīfah Faḥīmah; 4 April 1956 – 25 August 2026) was a station manager for Libyan Arab Airlines at Luqa Airport, Malta. On 31 January 2001, he was acquitted of 270 counts of murder in the Pan Am Flight 103 bombing trial by a panel of three Scottish judges sitting in a special court at Camp Zeist, Netherlands, in light of evidence that he was in Sweden at the time of the bombing and therefore could not have been a participant. His co-accused, Abdelbaset al-Megrahi, was found guilty by unanimous decision of the court and sentenced to life imprisonment, but later released on compassionate grounds, having always maintained his innocence.

== Trial ==
Fhimah was represented by solicitors Eddie McKechnie and Paul Phillips and advocates Richard Keen, Jack Davidson and Murdo MacLeod. Representing Megrahi were his solicitor, Alistair Duff, and advocates William Taylor, David Burns and John Beckett. Both defendants also had access to Libyan defence lawyer, Kamel Maghour. Court proceedings started on 3 May 2000.

The judges announced their verdict on 31 January 2001. They were unanimous in finding Fhimah not guilty. Fhimah was released from custody and returned to his home at Souq al-Jum'aa in Libya on 1 February 2001.

== Personal life and death ==
Fhimah was born and lived in Souq al Jum'aa, near Tripoli, Libya, with his wife and five children. He died on 25 August 2026, at the age of 70.
