= Souq al Jum'aa =

Municipality in Libya

Coordinates: 32°53′N 13°14′E

Sūq al-Jum'a (also Soug el Giuma, Soug El Juma’aa, or Sough el Giumaa ( Arabic : سوق الجمعة ), literally "Friday Market") is a densely populated residential district of Tripoli, Libya, located about 5 miles east of central Tripoli and now incorporated into the greater metropolitan area of the capital. The population in (2011) was estimated to be roughly 40,000 residents. A majority of these residents, 60%, are considered to be "native Libyan, from Tripoli and Arab", however, this population is mixed with those of indigenous Berber and Turkish descent as well, and dominantly Amazigh (Berber). Many families in this area reject the idea of tribal society and consider themselves to be 100% from Tripoli/Libya (first) and Arab (second), but they likely descend from, and are part of, the Magarha tribe, which is among the largest in Libya. The Magarha tribe originates in the Fezzan province of Libya (to the south of Tripolitania). Soug al Juma'aa was among the first districts within Tripoli proper to fight and rebel against Gaddafi in the 17 February 2011 revolution which led to Gaddafi's ultimate downfall, despite the Magarha tribe's strong ties and links to Gaddafi. Along with Tajura, residents of Soug al Jum’aa are considered to be the original inhabitants of Tripoli.

In the years of Italian colonialism, it was the seat of one of the six districts of the Province of Tripoli, with jurisdiction over the area of Tripolitania, which is to the east of the capital. It is now a separate municipality.

== Sports/Sports Facilities ==
The town was crossed by the city circuit on which the Grand Prix of Tripoli took place from 1925 to 1933, and it was in this area that, in 1930, a cyclist by the name of Gastone Brilli-Peri died in a tragic accident. This event led authorities to design a safer city racetrack, which was inaugurated on the occasion of the VIII Grand Prix of Tripoli on May 6, 1934, by then governor Italo Balbo within the oasis of Tagiura . This new racetrack, with eight thousand seats, was designed by the engineers Attilio Arcangeli and Luigi Maruffi . [3]

== Infrastructure and transport ==
Along the banks of the sea was built a military airport, Mellaha (now Mitiga International Airport). As part of the Libyan Campaign (1913-1921) during World War I, on October 2, 1916, the 12th Caproni Squadron arrived at the Mellaha flight field and on October 10, 1916, the 2 Farman Sections became the 104th Defense Farm Squadron on Mellaha Air Field. At the beginning of 1919, the 90th Squadron also arrived. The base was also used by the Italian Air Force and the German Luftwaffe during the Second World War. Later it played host to an American aviation base under the name of "Wheelus Air Base" until 1970, and after the 1969 Gaddafi coup, it again changed names to "Oqba ben Nāfi Air Base" and was one of the main operational installations of military functions of the Libyan Air Force and took a secondary role in regards to civil aviation.

During the Cold War, it housed some soldiers and aircraft of the Soviet Air Force, and was one of the main targets of the 1986 American bombing of Libya on April 15, 1986.

Beginning in 1995, the facilities have been converted and remodeled for civil use and now house "Mitiga International Airport", ( IATA : MJI, ICAO : HLLM), a secondary airport for the city of Tripoli, since made a more primary airport due to damage to TIP in the Libyan Civil War, with connections to many major cities within the Middle East and North Africa.
