= Scottish Court in the Netherlands =

Special sitting of the High Court of Justiciary

Coordinates: 52.111748°N 5.301248°E

- Interactive map of Scottish Court in the Netherlands
- Established: 1999
- Dissolved: 2002
- Jurisdiction: Scots Law
- Location: Kamp van Zeist, Zeist, Netherlands

The Right Honourable
- Currently: Lord Cullen
- Since: 1998
- Lead position ends: 2002

Other Judges
- Currently: Lord Kirkwood, Lord Osborne, Lord Macfadyen and Lord Nimmo-Smith.
- Since: 1998
- Lead position ends: 2002

The Scottish court in the Netherlands was a special sitting of the High Court of Justiciary set up under Scots law in a former United States Air Force base, Camp Zeist near Utrecht, in the Netherlands, for the trial of two Libyans charged with 270 counts of murder in connection with the bombing of Pan Am Flight 103 over Lockerbie, Scotland, on 21 December 1988. A school on the former base was converted into a judicial court for the trial.

== Neutral country ==
The court was established in a neutral country as part of a deal between Colonel Muammar Gaddafi of Libya and the British government, before Gaddafi would allow the extradition of the two accused.

== Special jurisdiction on territory ==
Under a bilateral treaty between the United Kingdom and the Kingdom of the Netherlands, the premises of the court were, for the duration of the trial and any subsequent appeal, under the authority and control of the court. Since the arrangement had been called for by United Nations Security Council Resolution 1192, it was given effect in Scots law by an Order-in-Council under the United Nations Act 1946, the High Court of Justiciary (Proceedings in the Netherlands) (United Nations) Order 1998 (SI 1998/2251). Dutch law still theoretically applied to the area, but, barring an emergency, the Dutch authorities were banned from entering the premises and the court had the authority to enact regulations that superseded Dutch law when necessary for the execution of the trial, and to jail people for contempt of court. The court itself, as well as people involved in the trial (officials of the court, accused, witnesses, solicitors, etc.), also enjoyed total or partial immunity from Dutch law.

== Verdict ==
The court convicted Abdelbaset al-Megrahi of 270 counts of murder in connection with the bombing on 31 January 2001. The second accused, Lamin Khalifah Fhimah, was acquitted. Megrahi's appeal was also held at the court (the High Court of Justiciary is the highest court of appeal in the Scottish criminal justice system), and was rejected on 14 March 2002. The site was then decommissioned and returned to the Dutch government. Megrahi served his sentence at Greenock prison in Inverclyde.

From September 2003, Megrahi's conviction was under review by the Scottish Criminal Cases Review Commission, which reported its findings on 28 June 2007 and granted Megrahi leave for a second appeal against conviction.

Diagnosed with prostate cancer and with an estimated three- to six-month life expectancy, Megrahi was released from Greenock prison in August 2009 after serving eight years, through a decision on compassionate grounds by the Scottish justice minister, Kenny MacAskill. He returned to Libya, where he died in May 2012.

== See also ==
- Pan Am Flight 103 bombing trial
- Hans Köchler's Lockerbie trial observer mission
