= Scottish Criminal Cases Review Commission =

Executive non-departmental public body of the Scottish government

Agency overview
- Formed: 1999
- Type: executive non-departmental public body
- Jurisdiction: Scotland
- Headquarters: Portland House, 17 Renfield Street, Glasgow, G2 5AH
- Minister responsible: Angela Constance MSP, Cabinet Secretary for Justice
- Agency executives: Dr Vanessa Davies, Chair; Michael Walker, Chief Executive
- Parent department: Justice Directorate, Scottish Government
- Parent agency: Scottish Government
- Key document: Criminal Procedure (Scotland) Act 1995
- Website: sccrc.org.uk

Map
- Scotland in the UK and Europe

The Scottish Criminal Cases Review Commission (SCCRC) is an executive non-departmental public body of the Scottish Government, established by the Criminal Procedure (Scotland) Act 1995 (as amended by the Crime and Punishment (Scotland) Act 1997).

The commission has the statutory power to refer cases dealt with on indictment (ie solemn procedure cases) to the High Court of Justiciary. This was extended to include summary cases by Statutory Instrument on 31 March 1999, immediately before the Commission took up its role in April 1999.

Though funded by the Scottish Government, investigations are carried out independently of Scottish Ministers, with the Commission being accountable to the Scottish Parliament on matters of finance and administration.

== Governance and administration ==
The commission is headed by chief executive, Michael Walker, and staffed by a director of corporate services, two senior legal officers, six legal officers and three administrative support staff. Eight legal officers and one senior legal officer are required to deal with the commission's normal case load. In order to review the case of Abdelbaset al-Megrahi, the commission sought approval from the Scottish Executive Justice Department for the appointment of two additional legal officers and one senior legal officer.

The SCCRC has a board of management of eight members appointed by the King on the recommendation of the First Minister of Scotland. As of 23 August 2025, its members are:

- Vanessa Davies - chairperson
- Alex Quinn
- Laura Reilly
- Jacqueline Fordyce
- Gillian Mawdsley
- Suzanne Mertes
- Finlay Young
- Alyson Forbes

By statute, at least one third of the commission's members are required to be legally qualified (either an advocate or solicitor of at least ten years standing) and at least two-thirds must have knowledge or experience of the criminal justice system.

The board members and the chief executive are required to work together to ensure that the commission runs efficiently and effectively.

== Remit and jurisdiction ==
The commission's role is to review and investigate cases where it is alleged that a miscarriage of justice may have occurred in relation to conviction, sentence or both. The commission can only review and investigate cases where the conviction and sentence were imposed by a Scottish Court (the High Court, a Sheriff Court or a Justice of the Peace Court), and when the appeal process has been exhausted.

=== Powers ===
The SCCRC can investigate both solemn and summary cases. It will conduct a thorough, independent and impartial review and investigation of all cases accepted for review. The commission has wide-ranging powers of investigation. After the review has been completed the commission will decide whether or not the case should be referred to the High Court. If it is decided to refer a case, the case will be heard and determined by the High Court of Justiciary as if it were a normal appeal.

== Aims ==
The main aims of the commission are:

- To ensure that all cases are dealt with efficiently and effectively;
- To deliver its services in ways appropriate to stakeholders' needs;
- To promote public understanding of the commission's role;
- To enhance public confidence in the ability of the criminal justice system to cure miscarriages of justice.

== Confidentiality and disclosure ==
The commission operates under strict statutory non-disclosure provisions, and cannot disclose any information about individual cases. The commission can disclose the fact that a case has been referred to the High Court but will not release any information regarding cases in which no referral has been made or in respect of cases under review.

== Statistics ==
As at 31 March 2007 the SCCRC had received a total of 887 cases since April 1999, when it was established. The Commission completed its review of 841 of these cases and referred 67 of them to the High Court. Of the referrals, 39 have been determined: 25 appeals were granted; 11 appeals rejected; and, 3 abandoned. Chief Executive, Gerard Sinclair, says that normally the court rules about half the referrals to be a miscarriage of justice each year, which would equate in 2003 to roughly 0.005% of the total number of Scottish criminal convictions. But, says Sinclair: "Even if it were just one wrongful conviction a year, that would still be one too many."

== Budget and expenditure ==
The Scottish Government agreed an SCCRC budget of £1.2m for 2008–09.

== Lockerbie bombing ==
=== Megrahi's 2003 application ===
Former SCCRC member, William Taylor QC, who acted as senior counsel for Megrahi at the Pan Am Flight 103 bombing trial and at his appeal in 2002, resigned as a commissioner on 23 September 2003. This was the same day as the SCCRC received an application from solicitors acting on Megrahi's behalf, requesting that it review his conviction. Megrahi's appeal against his 27-year minimum jail sentence was scheduled to be heard in Edinburgh before a panel of five Judges on 11 July 2006. This July hearing was, however, postponed to allow the question of the venue for the appeal (Edinburgh or Camp Zeist, Netherlands) to be resolved. On 1 November 2006 Megrahi was reported to have dropped his demand for the appeal against sentence – and any further appeal against conviction that the SCCRC might award – to be held at Camp Zeist.

=== SCCRC's decision ===
In January 2007, the SCCRC announced that it would issue its decision on Megrahi's case by the end of June 2007. On 17 June 2007 The Observer confirmed that the SCCRC's decision was imminent and reported:

"Abdelbaset al-Megrahi never wavered in his denial of causing the Lockerbie disaster: now Scottish legal experts say they believe him."

On 28 June 2007 the SCCRC announced its decision to refer the case to the Court of Criminal Appeal for Megrahi's second appeal against conviction, having concluded:

"that there is no reasonable basis in the trial court's judgment for its conclusion that the purchase of the items [clothes that were found in the wreckage of the plane] from Mary's House [in Malta] took place on 7 December 1988."

It is anticipated that preparation for the appeal before a panel of three Judges in Edinburgh could take as long as a year.

=== International observer's view ===
Professor Hans Köchler, who was appointed by UN Secretary General, Kofi Annan, to observe the Pan Am Flight 103 bombing trial at Camp Zeist, Netherlands was reported to be baffled by the SCCRC's four-year delay in reaching a conclusion. Köchler said:

"In my experience as observer of the Lockerbie trial, the Roman law system is superior to the common law system (practised in Scotland), particularly in matters of criminal law. It is indeed revealing that it takes the SCCRC so many years (that are apparently needed, inter alia, for secret negotiations between the governments of the involved countries) to announce its decision on whether there should be a retrial in the Lockerbie case or not."

Following the SCCRC's decision on 28 June 2007 to refer the case back for a second appeal, Köchler expressed surprise at the focus of the commission's review and its apparent bias in favour of the judicial establishment:

"In giving exoneration to the police, prosecutors and forensic staff, I think they show their lack of independence. No officials to be blamed: simply a Maltese shopkeeper."

On 4 July 2007 Köchler wrote to Scottish First Minister, Alex Salmond, to Foreign Secretary, David Miliband, to Home Secretary, Jacqui Smith, and to FCO Minister of State with responsibility for Africa, Asia and the UN, Mark Malloch Brown describing the SCCRC's decision as "long overdue" and calling for a full and independent public inquiry into the Lockerbie case.

=== Administration of the Lockerbie review ===
On page 16 of the 2007–2008 annual report and accounts of the SCCRC, published on 4 June 2008, chief executive Gerald Sinclair has written a summary of the SCCRC's administration of the Lockerbie review.

== See also ==
- Criminal Cases Review Commission
- Ernest Barrie – Scottish man whose conviction was quashed after a Rough Justice campaign only for him to go on to kill a man
