= Andrew Halliday =

Andrew Halliday may refer to:

- Andrew Halliday (journalist) (1830–1877), Scottish journalist and dramatist
- Sir Andrew Halliday (physician) (1782–1839), Scottish physician, reformer, and writer
- Andy Halliday (born 1991), Scottish footballer

== See also ==
- Andrew Hallidie (disambiguation)
