= Andrew Hallidie =

Andrew Hallidie may refer to:

- Andrew Halliday (physician), or Andrew Hallidie, royal physician to King William IV and Queen Victoria
- Andrew Smith Hallidie, promoter of the first line of the San Francisco cable car system

== See also ==
- Andrew Halliday (disambiguation)
