= Andrew Halliday (physician) bibliography =

Sir Andrew Halliday bibliography
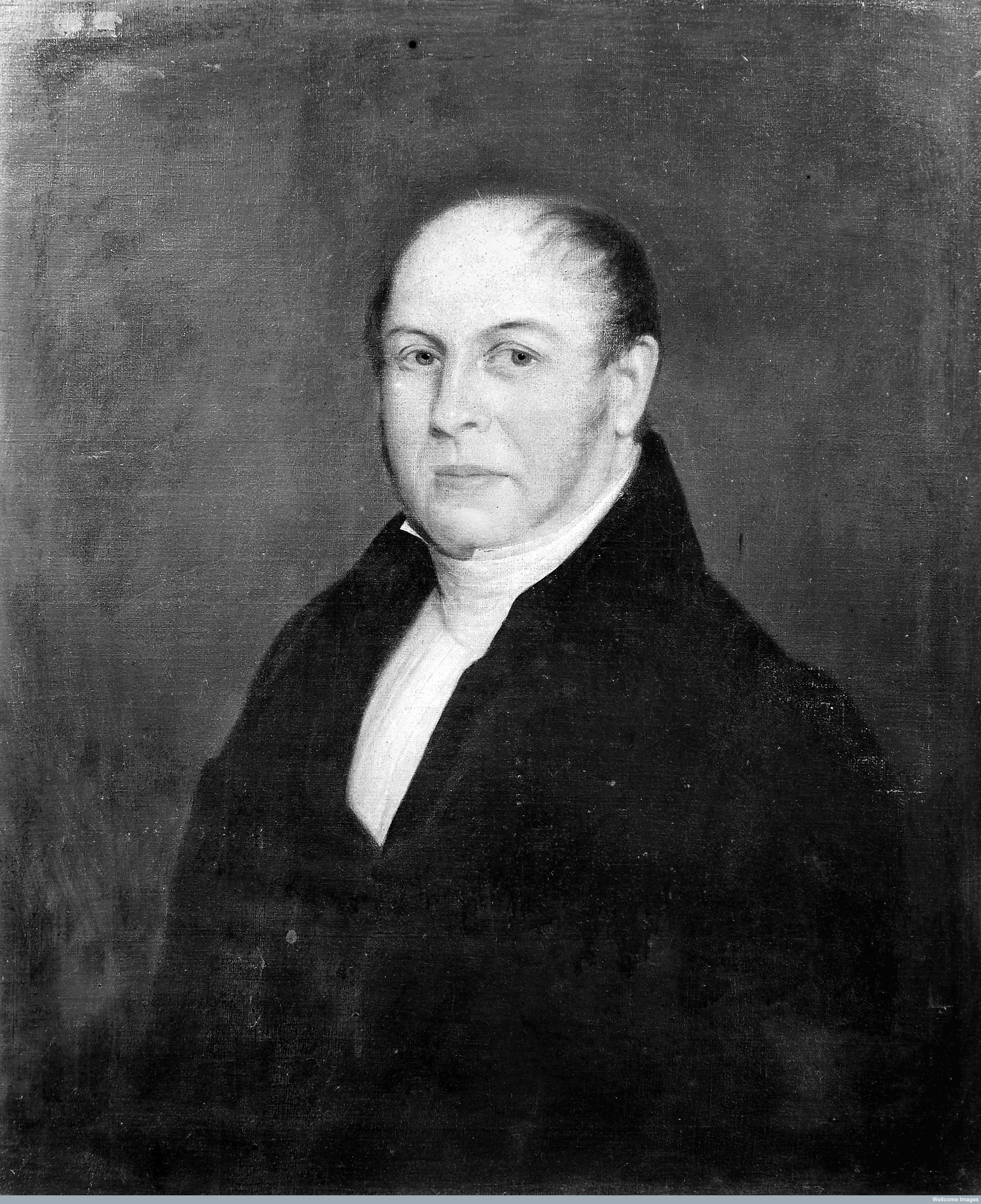
- Sir Andrew Halliday, K.B.E., M.D. Scottish physician, reformer, and writer Image from Wellcome Library, London.
- Books↙: 9
- Articles↙: 1
- Books edited↙: 1

This is a list of works published by Sir Andrew Halliday, K.B.E., M.D.

== Books written by Halliday ==
- — (1806). De Pneumatosi (M.D. thesis) (in Latin). Edinburgh, Scotland: William Creech. OCLC 646738752, 64444118, 257430473.
- — (1807). Observations on emphysema; or, The disease which arises from an effusion of air into the cavity of the thorax, or subcutaneous cellular membrane. London, UK: Longman, Hurst, Rees, & Orme. OCLC 3566402, 494409017.
- — (1808). Remarks on the Present State of Lunatic Asylums in Ireland. London, UK: Murray. OCLC 14835656, 606354617, 832537378.
- — (1812) [1811]. The present state of Portugal, and of the Portuguese army : with an epitome of the ancient history of that kingdom (2nd ed.). Edinburgh; London: G. R. Clarke; Longman, Hurst, Rees, Orme and Brown. OCLC 719405472.
- — (1816). Memoir of the campaign of 1815. Printed By P. Didot. Paris, France: Galignani. OCLC 228699648, 457585273.
- — (1821). A general history of the House of Guelph, or the Royal Family of Great Britain, from the earliest period to the accession of George I. London, UK. OCLC 181161798.
- — (1826). Annals of the house of Hanover. Vol. 1 & 2. London, UK: N. Sams. OCLC 674208974. Other ebooks available at:

- Annals of the House of Hanover, Vol. 1 at the Internet Archive and Annals of the House of Hanover, Vol. 2 at the Internet Archive
- Annals of the House of Hanover, Vol. 1 at Google Books and Annals of the House of Hanover, Vol. 2 at Google Books

- — (1828). A General View of the Present State of Lunatics, and Lunatic Asylums, in Great Britain and Ireland, and in Some Other Kingdoms. London, UK: Thomas & George Underwood. OCLC 23929332.
- — (1837). The West Indies: the Nature and Physical History of the Windward and Leeward Colonies. London, UK: J. W. Parker. OCLC 3986269. Republished:
  - — (1837). The West Indies : the natural and physical history of the Windward and Leeward colonies. Cambridge, UK: Cambridge University Press. doi:10.1017/CBO9780511782664. ISBN 9781108023108. OCLC 707202682, 861981230.
- — (1839). A letter to the Right Honble. the Secretary at War, on sickness and mortality in the West Indies. London, UK: J. W. Parker.

== Articles written by Halliday ==
- — (September 1821). "Observations on the Use of three different Preparations of Iodine as a Remedy for Bronchocele, and in the Treatment of Scofula". London Medical Repository. XVI. London, UK: Thomas and George Underwood. OCLC 560828840, 867819189. Reprinted:
  - — (1822). "Observations on the Use of three different Preparations of Iodine as a Remedy for Bronchocele, and in the Treatment of Scofula". The Journal of Foreign Medical Science and Literature. Vol. 2. Philadelphia, PA: A. Finley. pp. 215–217. OCLC 1754596, 664617317.
- — (1835). "On the Bebeeru Tree of British Guiana and Sulphate of Bebeerine, the former a substitute for Cinchona, the latter for Sulphate of Quinine". The Edinburgh Medical and Surgical Journal. 44: 546–548.

== Books edited by Halliday ==
- Pringle, John Alexander (1841). Halliday, Andrew (ed.). Select remains of John Alexander Pringle, Esq. London, UK: Harrison and Co. OCLC 655980855. Published posthumously.
