= Abu Agila Masud =

Tunisian terrorist

Abu Agila Mohammad Masud Kheir Al-Marimi (born 1951 or 1952) is a Tunisian-born Libyan former military and intelligence operative. US prosecutors have accused him of constructing the explosive devices that destroyed Pan Am Flight 103 on 21 December 1988, known as the Lockerbie bombing.

== Legal charges ==
He was charged by the U.S. in December 2020, and arrested in December 2022. He pled not guilty in February 2023, and it was announced that he would face a federal trial.

In December 2023, a trial was set for May 2025 but was delayed by request of a lawyer and was set to begin in April 2026.

The trial was delayed again and he was due to go on trial in August 2026, but the late discovery of new evidence by the prosecutor delayed the trial until January 2027.
