= Pan Am Flight 103 =

1988 aircraft bombing over Scotland

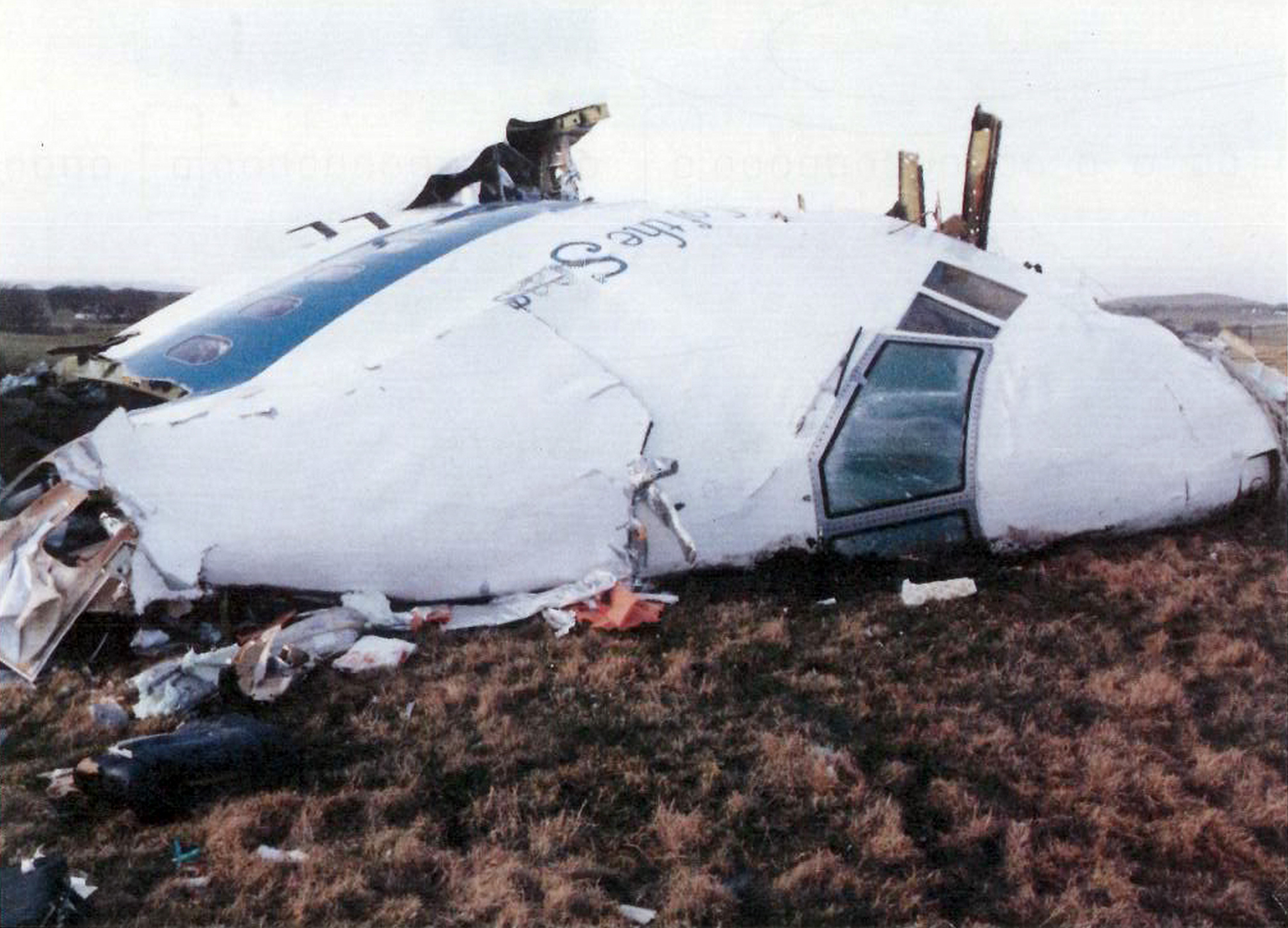
- The remains of the forward section

Bombing
- Date: 21 December 1988
- Summary: In-flight breakup resulting from an airliner bombing by Libyan Mukhabarat el-Jamahiriya officers
- Site: Lockerbie, Scotland; 55°06′56″N 003°21′31″W
- Total fatalities: 270

Aircraft
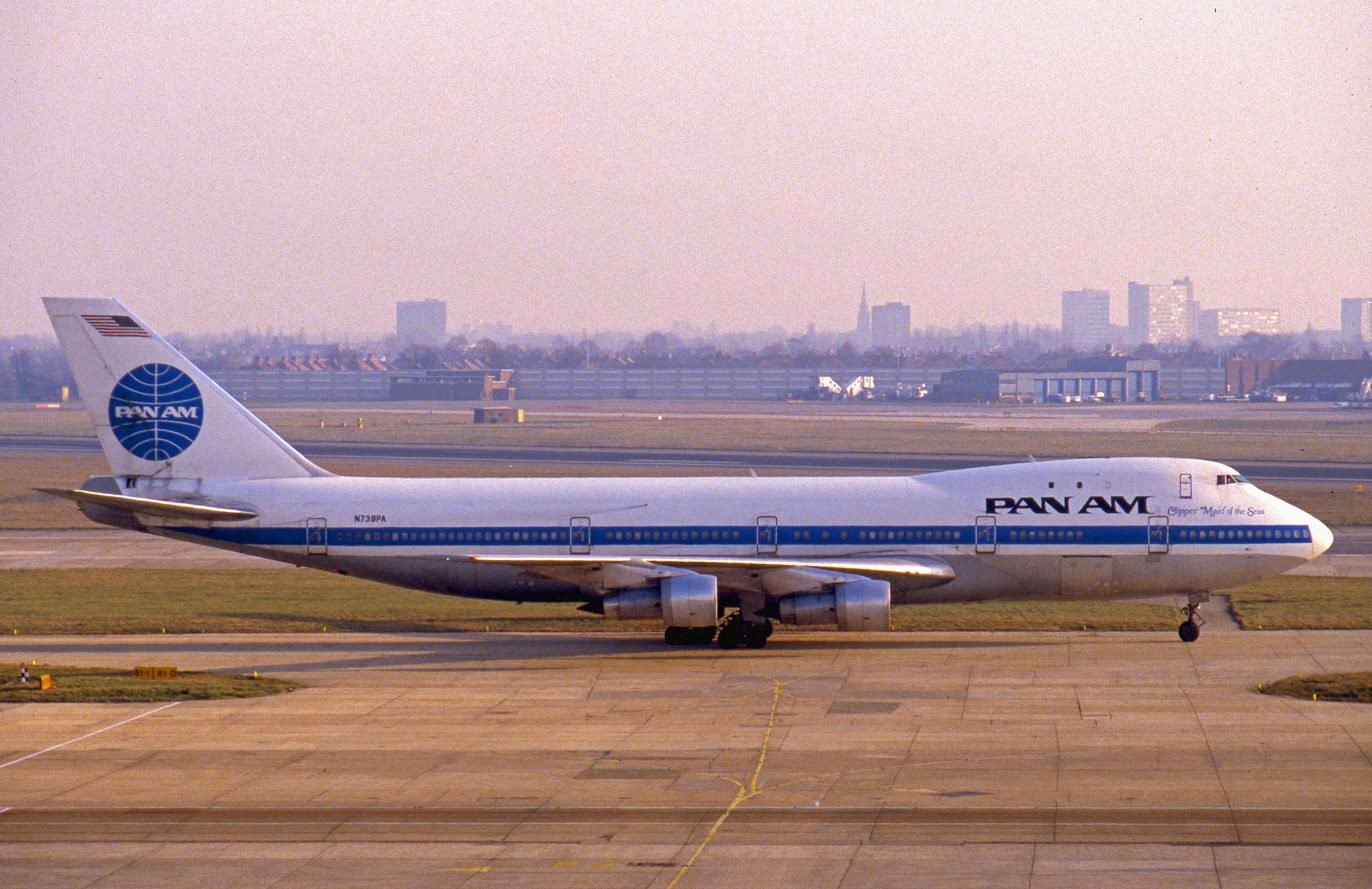
- N739PA, the aircraft involved, seen in 1987
- Aircraft type: Boeing 747-121
- Aircraft name: Clipper Maid of the Seas
- Operator: Pan American World Airways
- IATA flight No.: PA103
- ICAO flight No.: PAA103
- Call sign: CLIPPER 103
- Registration: N739PA
- Flight origin: Frankfurt Airport, Frankfurt, West Germany
- 1st stopover: Heathrow Airport, London, United Kingdom
- Last stopover: John F. Kennedy International Airport, New York, United States
- Destination: Detroit Metropolitan Airport, Detroit, Michigan, United States
- Occupants: 259
- Passengers: 243
- Crew: 16
- Fatalities: 259
- Survivors: 0

Ground casualties
- Ground fatalities: 11

Pan Am Flight 103 was a regularly scheduled Pan Am flight from Frankfurt to Detroit, with stopovers in London and New York City. Shortly after 19:00 GMT on 21 December 1988, the Boeing 747 Clipper Maid of the Seas operating the transatlantic leg of the flight was destroyed by a bomb while flying over the Scottish town of Lockerbie. The attack killed 270 people: all 243 passengers, the 16 crew members, and 11 residents of Lockerbie who were killed by fire and falling debris. The Lockerbie Bombing is the deadliest terrorist attack in the history of the United Kingdom and one of the deadliest terrorist attacks in European history.

In 1991, after a three-year joint investigation between Dumfries and Galloway Constabulary, supported by Strathclyde Police, the London Metropolitan Police, and the US Federal Bureau of Investigation (FBI), arrest warrants were issued for two Libyan Mukhabarat el-Jamahiriya officers. In 1999, after repeated negotiations and United Nations sanctions, Libyan leader Muammar Gaddafi allowed extradition of the two men for trial at Camp Zeist, the Netherlands.

In 2001, Abdelbaset al-Megrahi was found guilty of 270 counts of murder in connection with the bombing, and was sentenced to life imprisonment. His co-accused, Lamin Khalifah Fhimah, was acquitted. In 2009, Megrahi was released by the Scottish Government on compassionate grounds after being diagnosed with prostate cancer. Megrahi died in 2012 and remains the only person convicted of the bombing, while Fhimah died in August 2026.

In 2003, Gaddafi paid more than US$2 billion in compensation to the families of the victims of the Lockerbie bombing. Although Gaddafi maintained he never personally ordered the attack, acceptance of Megrahi's status as a government employee was used to connect responsibility by Libya with a series of requirements laid out by a UN resolution for sanctions against Libya to be lifted. In 2011, during the First Libyan Civil War, former Minister of Justice Mustafa Abdul Jalil said Gaddafi personally ordered the bombing.

The complexity of the operation required the involvement of several accomplices, several of whom were identified but never apprehended. The lack of convictions has given rise to conspiracy theories and truth campaigns led by relatives of the victims. Jim Swire, whose daughter Flora was killed in the attack, believes the bomb was loaded at Heathrow Airport, and was not sent via feeder flights from Malta, as the US and UK investigators determined.

In 2020, US authorities indicted Tunisian resident and Libyan national Abu Agila Masud, who was 37 years old at the time of the incident, for participating in the bombing. In 2022, Masud was taken into custody, and pleaded not guilty in 2023. A federal trial was scheduled for 2026, but was delayed again days before it was due to begin in August 2026 due to newly discovered evidence.

Pan Am 103 was the second Boeing 747 destroyed by a mid-air bombing, after Air India 182 in June 1985; while the Pan Am flight was a 747-100, the Air India flight was a 747-200. A previous 747, Pan Am Flight 93, was blown up on the ground in 1970 during the Dawson's Field hijackings, the first hull loss of a 747.

== Aircraft ==
The aircraft operating Pan Am Flight 103 was a Boeing 747-121, MSN 19646, registered as N739PA and named Clipper Maid of the Seas. Before 1979, it had been named Clipper Morning Light. It was the 15th 747 built and had first flown on 25 January 1970. It was delivered to Pan Am on 15 February, one month after the first 747 entered service with Pan Am. In 1978, as Clipper Morning Light, it had appeared in "Conquering the Atlantic", the fourth episode of the BBC Television documentary series Diamonds in the Sky, presented by Julian Pettifer.

== Flight ==
Pan Am 103 originated as a feeder flight at Frankfurt Airport, West Germany, using a Boeing 727 and the flight number PA103-A. Both Pan Am and Trans World Airlines routinely changed the type of aircraft operating different legs of a flight. PA103 was bookable as either a single Frankfurt–New York or a Frankfurt–Detroit itinerary, though a scheduled change of aircraft took place in London's Heathrow Airport.

After the bombing, the flight number was changed, in accordance with standard practice among airlines after disasters. The Frankfurt–London–New York–Detroit route was being served by Pan Am Flight 3 until the company's demise in 1991.

== Explosion and impact timeline ==
=== Departure ===
On the day of the disaster, Clipper Maid of the Seas, a Boeing 747-100 with the registration N739PA, whose previous flight had originated from Los Angeles and arrived via San Francisco as flight PA 124, landed at 12 noon and parked at Gate K-14 at Heathrow Terminal 3. Passengers and their luggage (as well as an unaccompanied suitcase that was part of the interline luggage on the feeder flight) were transferred directly to the plane, which operated the flight's transatlantic leg. The plane pushed back from the terminal at 18:04 and took off from runway 27R at 18:25, bound for New York JFK Airport and then Detroit Metropolitan Wayne County Airport. Contrary to many popular accounts of the disaster (though repeated, with reference, below), the flight, which had a scheduled gate departure time of 18:00, left Heathrow airport on time.

=== Loss of contact ===
At 18:58, the aircraft established two-way radio contact with Shanwick Oceanic Area Control in Prestwick, Scotland, on 123.95 MHz. The transmission was made by Captain MacQuarrie. He transmitted, "Good evening, Scottish. Clipper 103. We are level at 310." The controller responded, "103, you are identified."

Clipper Maid of the Seas approached the corner of the Solway Firth at 19:01, and crossed the coast at 19:02 UTC. On scope, the aircraft showed transponder code, or "squawk", 0357 and flight level 310. At this point, the Clipper Maid of the Seas was flying at 31,000 feet (9,400 metres) on a heading of 316° magnetic, and at a speed of 313 kn (580 km/h; 360 mph) calibrated airspeed. Subsequent analysis of the radar returns by RSRE concluded that the aircraft was tracking 321° (grid) and traveling at a ground speed of 803 km/h (499 mph; 434 kn).

At 19:02:44, Alan Topp, the airways controller at Scottish Air Traffic Control Centre (ATC), transmitted its oceanic route clearance on behalf of Shanwick. The aircraft did not acknowledge this message. Clipper Maid of the Seas's "squawk" then flickered off just slightly northeast of the village of Kettleholm. Air traffic control tried to make contact with the flight, with no response. A loud noise was recorded on the cockpit voice recorder (CVR) at 19:02:50. Five radar echoes fanning out appeared, instead of one. Comparison of the CVR to the radar returns showed that, eight seconds after the explosion, the wreckage had a 1-nautical-mile (1.9 km) spread. A British Airways pilot, flying the London–Glasgow shuttle near Carlisle, called Scottish ATC to report that he could see a huge fire on the ground.

=== Disintegration of aircraft ===
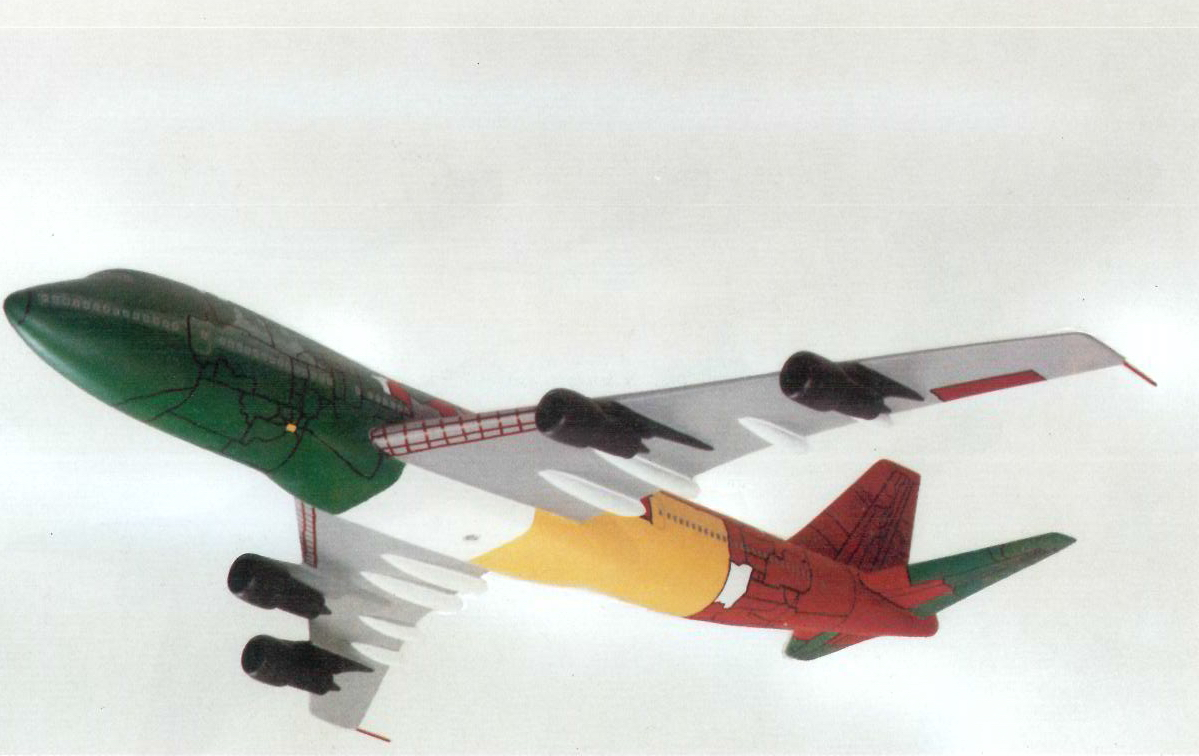
Air Accident Investigation Branch model showing fuselage and tail fracture lines and ground locations of parts: Green—southern wreckage trail; red—northern wreckage trail; grey—impact crater; yellow—Rosebank (Lockerbie); white—not recovered/identified.

The explosion tore a 50 cm (20-inch) hole in the left side of the fuselage, causing the upper deck walls and roof to rip away from the plane within the first few seconds post-explosion. Investigators from the US Federal Aviation Administration (FAA) concluded no emergency procedures had been started in the cockpit. The CVR, located in the tail section of the aircraft, was found in a field by police searchers within 24 hours. No distress call was recorded; a 180-millisecond hissing noise could be heard as the explosion destroyed the aircraft's communications center. The explosion in the aircraft hold was magnified by the uncontrolled decompression of the fuselage. The aircraft's elevator- and rudder-control cables were disrupted and the fuselage pitched downwards and to the left.

Investigators from the Air Accidents Investigation Branch of the British Department for Transport concluded that the nose of the aircraft was blown off and separated from the main fuselage within three seconds of the explosion. The nose cone was briefly held on by a band of metal, but facing aft, like the lid of a can. It then sheared off, up, and backwards to starboard, striking off the number-three engine and landing some distance outside the town, on a hill in Tundergarth.

=== Fuselage impact ===
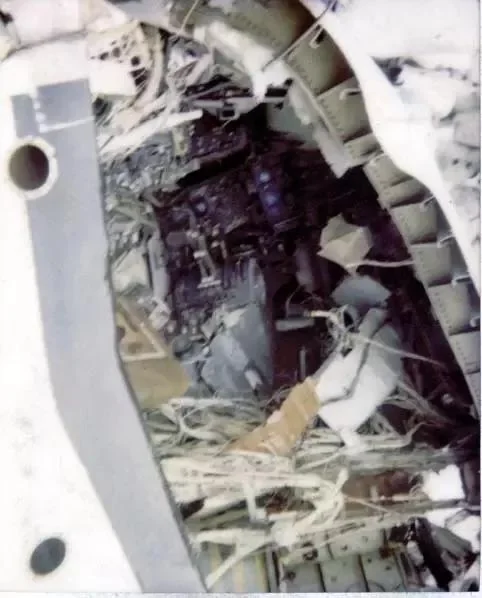
The flight deck of N739PA where it came to rest at 55° 6'55.35"N 3°17'43.73"W

The fuselage continued moving forward and down until it reached 19,000 ft (5,800 m), when its dive became nearly vertical. Due to the extreme flutter, the vertical stabilizer disintegrated, which in turn produced large yawing movements. As the forward fuselage continued to disintegrate, the flying debris tore off both of the horizontal stabilizers, while the rear fuselage, the remaining three engines, and the fin torque box separated. The rear fuselage, parts of the baggage hold, and three landing gear units landed at Rosebank Crescent. The fuselage consisting of the main wing box structure landed in Sherwood Crescent and exploded, destroying three homes and creating a large impact crater. The 200,000 lb (91,000 kg) of jet fuel ignited by the impact started fires, which destroyed several additional houses. Investigators determined that both wings had landed in the Sherwood Crescent crater, saying, "the total absence of debris from the wing primary structure found remote from the crater confirmed the initial impression that the complete wing box structure had been present at the main impact."

The British Geological Survey 23 km (14 miles) away at Eskdalemuir registered a seismic event at 19:03:36 measuring 1.6 on the moment magnitude scale, which was attributed to the impact. According to the report, the rest of the wreckage composed of "the complete fuselage forward of approximately station 480 to station 380 and incorporating the flight deck and nose landing gear was found as one piece in a field approximately 4 kilometres (2.5 miles) east of Lockerbie." This field, located opposite Tundergarth Church, is where the wreckage most easily identified with images of the incident in the media fell, having fallen "almost flat on its left side, but with a slight nose-down attitude."

== Victims ==
Nation	Passengers	Crew	Ground	Total
Argentina	2	–	–	2
Belgium	1	–	–	1
Bolivia	1	–	–	1
Canada	3	–	–	3
France	2	1	–	3
Germany	3	1	–	4
Hungary	4	–	–	4
India	3	–	–	3
Ireland	3	–	–	3
Israel	1	–	–	1
Italy	2	–	–	2
Jamaica	1	–	–	1
Japan	1	–	–	1
Philippines	1	–	–	1
South Africa	1	–	–	1
Spain	–	1	–	1
Sweden	2	1	–	3
Switzerland	1	–	–	1
Trinidad and Tobago	1	–	–	1
United Kingdom	31	1	11	43
United States	179	11	–	190
Total	243	16	11	270

All 243 passengers and sixteen crew members were killed, as were eleven residents of Lockerbie on the ground. Of the 270 total fatalities, 190 were American citizens and forty-three were British citizens. Nineteen other nationalities were represented, with four or fewer passengers per country. One Canadian victim, Hanne-Maria Root (nee Maijala) was a dual citizen of Canada and Finland. The bodies of seventeen victims – ten passengers (six Americans, three Hungarians, and one Canadian) and seven Lockerbie residents – were never found, and were presumed to have been virtually vaporized by the fireball of the impact crater.

=== Crew ===
Flight 103 was under the command of Captain James B. MacQuarrie (55), a Pan Am pilot since 1964 with almost 11,000 flight hours, of which more than 4,000 had been accrued in 747 aircraft. He previously served three years in the US Navy and five years in the Massachusetts Air National Guard, where he held the rank of major. First Officer Raymond R. Wagner (52), a pilot with Pan Am since 1966 with almost 5,500 hours in the 747 and a total of nearly 12,000 hours, had previously served eight years in the New Jersey National Guard. Flight Engineer Jerry D. Avritt (46), who joined Pan Am in 1980 after 13 years with National Airlines, had more than 8,000 hours of flying time, with nearly 500 hours in the 747. The cockpit crew was based at John F. Kennedy International Airport.

Six of the 13 cabin crew members became naturalized US citizens while working for Pan Am. The cabin crew was based at Heathrow and lived in the London area or commuted from around Europe. All were originally hired by Pan Am and seniority ranged from 9 months to 28 years.

The captain, first officer, flight engineer, a flight attendant and several first-class passengers were found still strapped to their seats inside the nose section when it crashed in Tundergarth. A flight attendant was found alive by a local woman, but died before help could be summoned. Some passengers may also have remained alive briefly after impact; a pathologist's report concluded that at least two of these passengers might have survived if they had received medical attention in time.

=== Passengers ===
==== Syracuse University students ====
Thirty-five of the passengers were students from Syracuse University, who participated in the university's overseas program named Division of International Programs Abroad (abbreviated as "DIPA Program" and renamed to "Syracuse University Abroad" in 2006) and were returning home for Christmas following a semester in Syracuse's London and European campuses. Ten of these students were from other universities and colleges (including Colgate University, Cornell University, and the University of Colorado) having collaborative relationships with Syracuse. Several of the students were due to connect to Pan Am Express Flight 4919 to Syracuse Hancock International Airport at JFK Airport later that evening.

Many of their bodies were found at Rosebank Crescent, 1/2-mile (0.8 km) from Sherwood Crescent. The rear fuselage of the plane, where many of them sat, destroyed one of the houses of Rosebank Crescent, 71 Park Place, the home of Lockerbie resident Ella Ramsden, who survived. The bodies of two of these students were never recovered.

==== Notable passengers ====
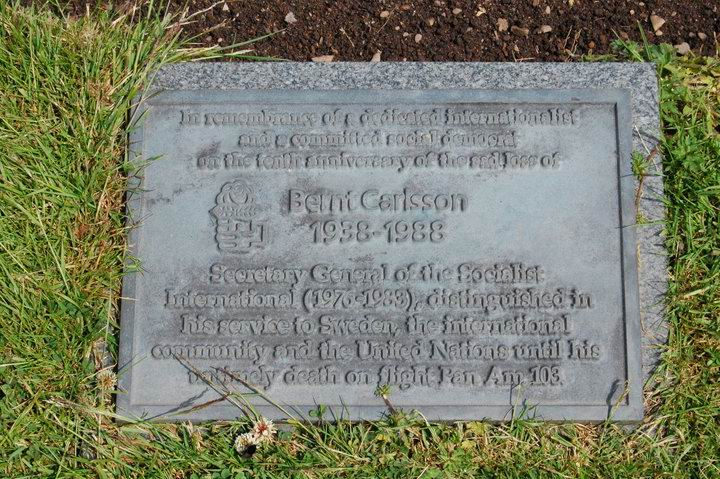
Dryfesdale Cemetery memorial stone dedicated to Bernt Carlsson

Prominent among the passenger victims was the 50-year-old UN Commissioner for Namibia (then South West Africa), Bernt Carlsson, who would have attended the signing ceremony of the New York Accords at the UN headquarters the following day. James Fuller, CEO of Volkswagen of America, was returning home together with marketing director Lou Marengo from a meeting with Volkswagen executives in West Germany. Also aboard were Irish Olympic sailor and management consultant Peter Dix, and rock musician Paul Jeffreys and his wife.

==== US government officials ====
Aboard the flight were Diplomatic Security Service (DSS) Special Agents Daniel Emmett O'Connor and Ronald Albert Lariviere. Matthew Gannon, the Central Intelligence Agency's (CIA) deputy station chief in Beirut, Lebanon, was sitting in seat 14J, which was located in the business class (branded as "Clipper Class") cabin. A group of US intelligence specialists was on board the flight. Their presence gave rise to speculations and conspiracy theories that one or more of them had been targeted.

=== Lockerbie residents ===
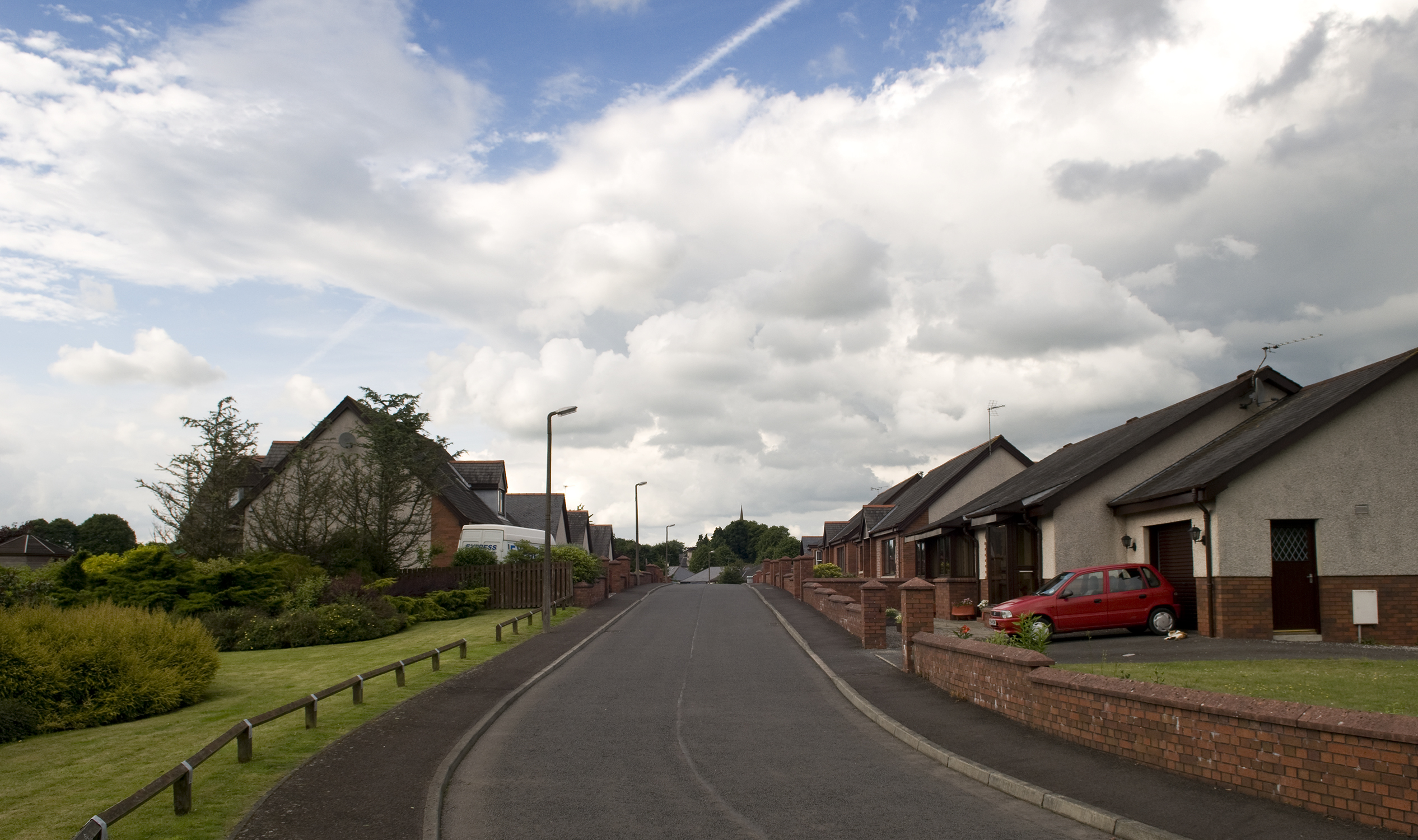
Wreckage of the plane landed in and around Lockerbie, including the residential street of Sherwood Crescent (pictured in 2008)

Eleven Lockerbie residents on Sherwood Crescent were killed when the wing section hit the house at 13 Sherwood Crescent at more than 800 km/h (500 mph) and exploded, creating a crater 47 m (154 ft) long and with a volume of 560 m^{3} (20,000 cu ft; 730 cu yd). The property was completely destroyed and its two occupants were killed. Their bodies were never found. Several other houses and their foundations were destroyed, and 21 others were damaged beyond repair.

A family of four was killed when their house at 15 Sherwood Crescent exploded. A couple and their daughter were killed by the explosion in their house at 16 Sherwood Crescent. Their son witnessed a fireball engulfing his home from a neighbour’s garage, where he had been repairing his sister's bicycle. The other Lockerbie residents who died were two widows aged 81 and 82, who also both lived in Sherwood Crescent; they were the two oldest victims of the disaster.

Patrick Keegans, Lockerbie's Catholic priest, was preparing to visit friends around 19:00 that evening with his mother, having recently been appointed a parish priest of the town. Keegans' house at 1 Sherwood Crescent was the only one on the street that was not either destroyed by the impact or gutted by fire. According to a BBC article on the fire published in 2018, Keegans had gone upstairs to make sure that he had hidden his mother's Christmas present, and recalls, "Immediately after that, there was an enormous explosion." Following this, "the shaking stopped and to his surprise he was uninjured." Keegans' mother was also unharmed, having been shielded from debris by a refrigerator-freezer.

Many of the passengers' relatives, most of them from the US, arrived there within days to identify the dead. Volunteers from Lockerbie set up and staffed canteens which stayed open 24 hours a day and offered relatives, soldiers, police officers, and social workers free sandwiches, hot meals, beverages, and counseling. The people of the town washed, dried, and ironed every piece of clothing that was found once the police had determined they were of no forensic value, so that as many items as possible could be returned to the relatives. The BBC's Scotland correspondent, Andrew Cassell, reported on the tenth anniversary of the bombing that the townspeople had "opened their homes and hearts" to the relatives, bearing their own losses "stoically and with enormous dignity," and that the bonds forged then continue to this day.

== Early warnings ==
Two alerts were made shortly before the bombing.

=== Helsinki warning ===
On 5 December 1988 (sixteen days before the attack), the US Federal Aviation Administration (FAA) issued a security bulletin saying that, on that day, a man with an Arabic accent had telephoned the US Embassy in Helsinki, Finland, and told them that a Pan Am flight from Frankfurt to the United States would be blown up within the next two weeks by someone associated with the Palestinian militant Abu Nidal Organization; he said a Finnish woman would carry the bomb on board as an unwitting courier.

The anonymous warning was taken seriously by the US government and the State Department cabled the bulletin to dozens of embassies. The FAA sent it to all US carriers, including Pan Am, which had charged each of the passengers a $5 security surcharge, promising a "program that will screen passengers, employees, airport facilities, baggage, and aircraft with unrelenting thoroughness"; the security team in Frankfurt found the warning under a pile of papers on a desk the day after the bombing.

=== PLO warning ===
Just days before the bombing, security forces in European countries, including the UK, were put on alert after a warning from the Palestine Liberation Organization (PLO) that extremists might launch terrorist attacks to undermine the then-current dialogue between the United States and the PLO.

=== South Africa ===
A South African delegation including Foreign Affairs Minister Pik Botha and Minister of Defence Magnus Malan, as well as the United Nations representative Bernt Carlsson were scheduled to fly on the doomed aircraft, en route to New York for the Namibian Independence Ratification Ceremony, ending the decades long Border War. Based on intelligence from the SA Bureau of State Security, the South African delegation changed flights and caught the earlier Pan Am 101 flight to New York. Carlsson perished on the bombed aircraft. As alluded to by Botha, the African National Congress, led by Oliver Tambo, was possibly behind the bombing of the flight in an attempt to eliminate the upper echelon of the National Party.

== Claims of responsibility ==
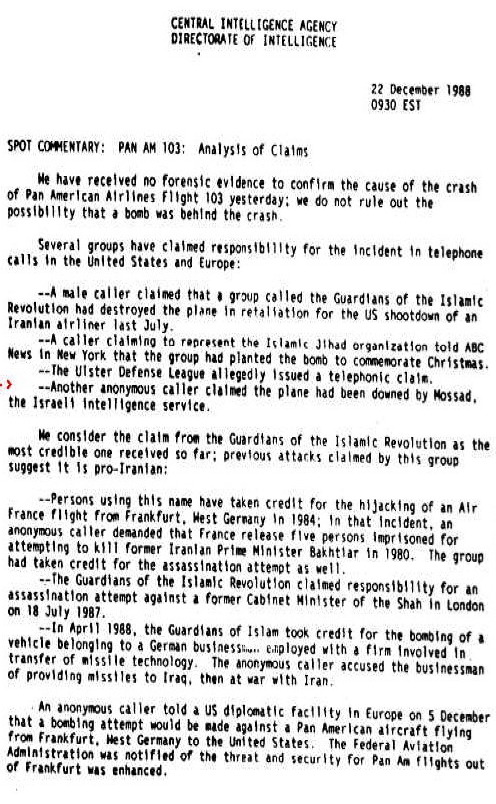
CIA analysis of various claims of responsibility for the bombing

On the day of the bombing, the French Directorate-General for External Security was informed by their British counterpart MI6 that the UK suspected the Libyans to be behind the bombing.

According to a CIA analysis dated 22 December 1988, several groups were quick to claim responsibility in telephone calls in the United States and Europe:

- A male caller claimed that a group called the "Guardians of the Islamic Revolution" had destroyed the plane in retaliation for Iran Air Flight 655 being shot down by US forces in the Persian Gulf the previous July.
- A caller claiming to represent the Islamic Jihad Organization told ABC News in New York that the group had planted the bomb to commemorate Christmas.
- Another caller claimed the plane had been downed by Mossad, the Israeli intelligence service.

The list's author noted, "We consider the claims from the Guardians of the Islamic Revolution as the most credible one received so far," but the analysis concluded, "We cannot assign responsibility for this tragedy to any terrorist group at this time. We anticipate that, as often happens, many groups will seek to claim credit."

In 2003, under pressure from international sanctions, Muammar Gaddafi, as leader of his government, paid compensation to the victims' families, while maintaining that he personally had not ordered the attack. On 22 February 2011, during the Libyan Civil War, former Minister of Justice Mustafa Abdul Jalil stated in an interview with the Swedish newspaper Expressen that Gaddafi had personally ordered the bombing. Jalil claimed to possess "documents that prove [his allegations] and [that he is] ready to hand them over to the international criminal court."

== Investigation ==
The original prime suspect in the bombing was the Popular Front for the Liberation of Palestine – General Command (PFLP-GC), a Syria-based group led by Ahmed Jibril. A flood of warnings immediately preceding the disaster had included one that read: 'team of Palestinians not associated with PLO intends to attack US targets in Europe. Time frame is present. Targets specified are Pan Am Airlines and US military bases.' Five weeks before this warning, Jibril's right-hand man, Haffez Dalkamoni, had been arrested in Frankfurt with a known bomb-maker, Marwen Khreesat. "Later US intelligence officials confirmed that members of the group had been monitoring Pan Am's facilities at Frankfurt airport. On Dalkamoni's account bombs made by Khreesat were at large somewhere." A deep-cover CIA agent was told by up to 15 high-level Syrian officials that the PFLP-GC was involved and that officials interacted with Jibril "on a constant basis". In 2014, an Iranian ex-spy asserted that Iran ordered the attack. The Iranian foreign ministry swiftly denied any involvement.

=== Civil investigation ===
==== Crash site ====
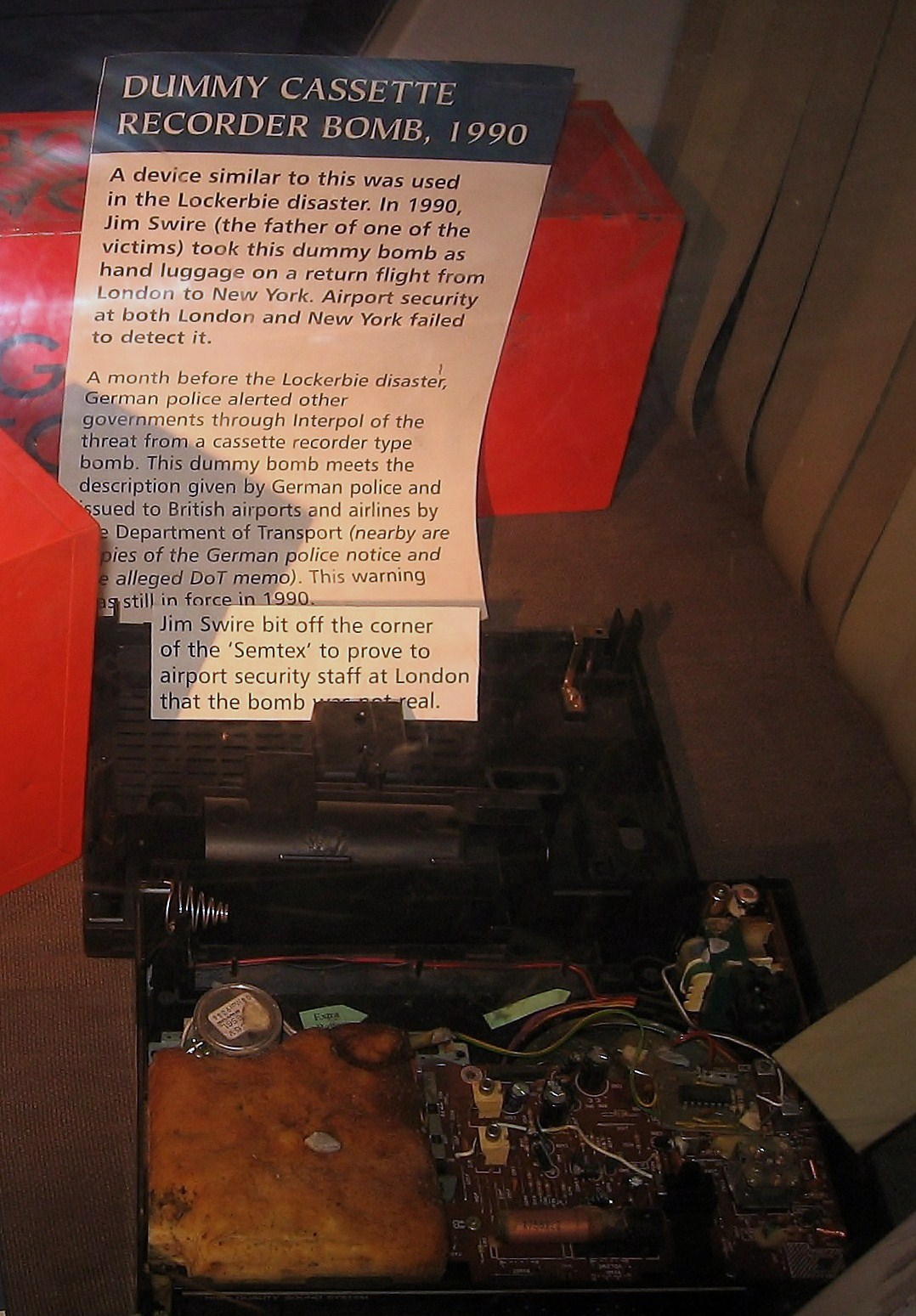
A replica of the radio bomb used in the disaster, built by Jim Swire (father of Pan Am 103 passenger Flora) using a Hitachi cassette player and marzipan, as part of a demonstration to highlight security deficiencies in the aftermath of the Lockerbie bombing.

The initial investigation into the crash site by Dumfries and Galloway Constabulary involved many helicopter surveys, satellite imaging, and a search of the area by police and soldiers. The wreckage of the crash was scattered over 2,000 km^{2} (770 square miles), and AAIB investigators were confronted by a massive jigsaw puzzle in trying to piece the plane back together. In total, 4 million pieces of wreckage were collected and registered on computer files. More than 10,000 pieces of debris were retrieved, tagged, and entered into a computer tracking system. The perpetrators had apparently intended the plane to crash into the sea, destroying any traceable evidence, but its explosion over land left a trail of evidence.

The fuselage of the aircraft was reconstructed by air accident investigators, revealing a 20-inch (510 mm) hole consistent with an explosion in the forward cargo hold. Examination of the baggage containers revealed that the container nearest the hole had blackening, pitting, and severe damage, indicating a "high-energy event" had taken place inside it. A series of test explosions was carried out to confirm the precise location and quantity of explosive used.

Fragments of a Samsonite suitcase believed to have contained the bomb were recovered, together with parts and pieces of circuit board identified as components of a Toshiba 'Bombeat' RT-SF16 radio cassette player, similar to that used to conceal a Semtex bomb seized by West German police from the Palestinian militant group PFLP-GC two months earlier. Items of baby clothing, which were subsequently proven to have been made in Malta, were thought to have come from the same suitcase.

==== Witnesses ====
The clothes were traced to a Maltese merchant, Tony Gauci, who became a key prosecution witness, testifying that he sold the clothes to a man of Libyan appearance. Gauci was interviewed 23 times, giving contradictory evidence about who had bought the clothes, that person's age and appearance, and the date of purchase, but later identified Abdelbaset al-Megrahi. As Megrahi had only been in Malta on 7 December, that date was assumed to be the purchase date. However, this date is in doubt, as Gauci had testified that Malta's Christmas lights had not been on when the clothes had been purchased; the lights were later found to have been switched on on 6 December. Scottish police had also failed to inform the defense that another witness had testified seeing Libyan men making a similar purchase on a different day.

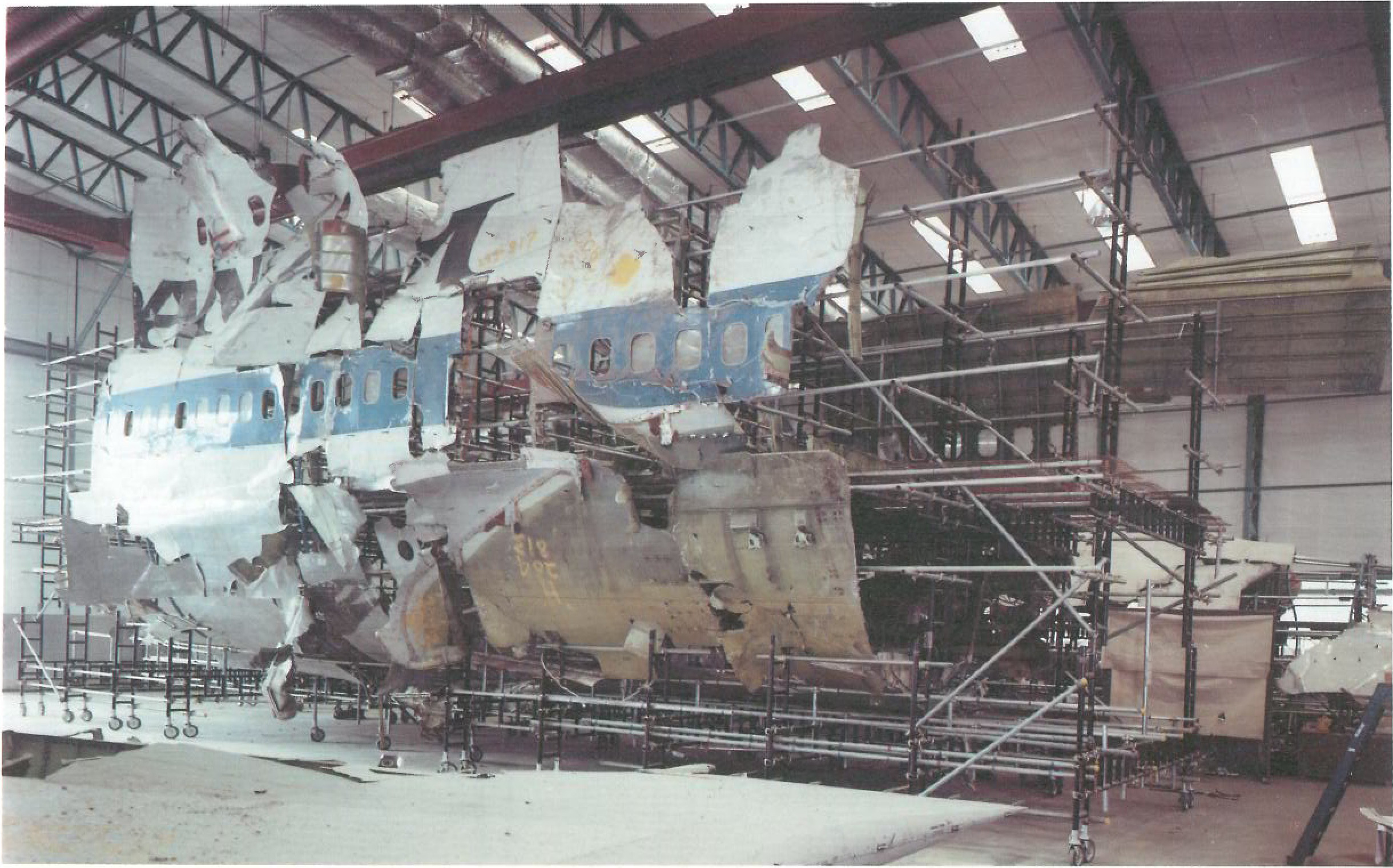
Fuselage three-dimensional reconstruction

An official report, providing information not made available to the defense during the original trial, stated that on 19 April 1999, four days before identifying al-Megrahi for the first time, Gauci had seen a picture of al-Megrahi in a magazine that connected him to the bombing, a fact that could have distorted his judgement. Gauci was shown the same magazine during his testimony at al-Megrahi's trial and asked if he had identified the photograph in April 1999 as being the person who purchased the clothing; he was then asked if that person was in the court. Gauci then identified al-Megrahi for the court, stating "He is the man on this side. He resembles him a lot".

A circuit board fragment, allegedly found embedded in a piece of charred material, was identified as part of an electronic timer similar to one found on a Libyan intelligence agent who had been arrested ten months previously for carrying materials for a Semtex bomb. The timer was allegedly traced through its Swiss manufacturer, Mebo, to the Libyan military, and Mebo employee Ulrich Lumpert identified the fragment at al-Megrahi's trial.

Mebo's owner, Edwin Bollier, testified at the trial that the Scottish police had originally shown him a fragment of a brown eight-ply circuit board from a prototype timer which had never been supplied to Libya. Yet the sample he was asked to identify at the trial was a green nine-ply circuit board that Mebo had indeed supplied to Libya. Bollier wanted to pursue this discrepancy, but was told by trial judge Lord Sutherland that he could not do so. Bollier claimed that in 1991 he had declined an offer of US$4 million from the FBI (equivalent to US$8.4 million in 2025 dollars) in exchange for his support of the main line of inquiry.

=== Criminal inquiry ===
Known as the Lockerbie bombing and the Lockerbie air disaster in the UK, it was described by Scotland's Lord Advocate as the UK's largest criminal inquiry led by the smallest police force in Britain, Dumfries and Galloway Constabulary.

After a three-year joint investigation by Dumfries and Galloway Constabulary and the US FBI, during which 15,000 witness statements were taken, indictments for murder were issued on 13 November 1991 against Abdelbaset al-Megrahi, a Libyan intelligence officer and the head of security for Libyan Arab Airlines (LAA), and Lamin Khalifah Fhimah, the LAA station manager in Luqa Airport, Malta. UN sanctions against Libya and protracted negotiations with Libyan leader Colonel Muammar Gaddafi secured the handover of the accused on 5 April 1999 to Scottish police at Camp Zeist, the Netherlands, which was selected as a neutral venue for their trial.

Both of the accused chose not to give evidence in court. On 31 January 2001, Megrahi was convicted of murder by a panel of three Scottish judges, and sentenced to life imprisonment, but Fhimah was acquitted. Megrahi's appeal against his conviction was refused on 14 March 2002, and his application to the European Court of Human Rights was declared inadmissible in July 2003. On 23 September 2003, Megrahi applied to the Scottish Criminal Cases Review Commission (SCCRC) for his conviction to be reviewed, and on 28 June 2007, the SCCRC announced its decision to refer the case to the High Court of Justiciary in Edinburgh after it found he "may have suffered a miscarriage of justice".

Megrahi served more than ten years of his sentence (beginning 5 April 1999), first in Barlinnie prison, Glasgow, and later in Greenock prison, Renfrewshire, throughout which time he maintained that he was innocent of the charges against him. He was released from prison on compassionate grounds on 20 August 2009.

In October 2015, Scottish prosecutors announced that they wanted to interview two Libyan nationals, whom they had identified as new suspects, over the bombing.

On 21 December 2020, the 32nd anniversary of the disaster, the United States attorney general announced that Abu Agela Mas'ud Kheir Al-Marimi, a Libyan national in custody in Libya, had been charged with terrorism-related crimes in connection with the bombing, accusing him of involvement in constructing the bomb.

On 11 December 2022, the United States advised they had Abu Agila Mohammad Mas'ud Kheir Al-Marimi in custody.

==== Aftermath ====
Following the bombing, as information emerged that warnings had been received, many people, both relatives of the victims as well as the general public, were outraged at the FAA and airlines for not disclosing information. Frustrated with a lack of accountability from government officials and agencies, the families of the victims created a lobbyist/support group known as "Victims of Pan Am Flight 103". This group, with the support of United States Senator Alfonse D'Amato of New York, in hearings before the Committee on Commerce, Science, and Transportation, offered the group's prepared statement for inclusion in the record of the hearings.

== Trial, appeals and release ==
On 3 May 2000, the trial of Abdelbaset al-Megrahi and Lamin Khalifah Fhimah began. Megrahi was found guilty of 270 counts of murder on 31 January 2001, and was sentenced to life imprisonment in Scotland; his co-defendant, Fhimah, was found not guilty.

The Lockerbie judgment stated:

From the evidence which we have discussed so far, we are satisfied that it has been proved that the primary suitcase containing the explosive device was dispatched from Malta, passed through Frankfurt, and was loaded onto PA103 at Heathrow. It is, as we have said, clear that with one exception, the clothing in the primary suitcase was the clothing purchased in Mr Gauci's shop on 7 December 1988. The purchaser was, on Mr Gauci's evidence, a Libyan. The trigger for the explosion was an MST-13 timer of the single solder mask variety. A substantial quantity of such timers had been supplied to Libya. We cannot say that it is impossible that the clothing might have been taken from Malta, united somewhere with a timer from some source other than Libya and introduced into the airline baggage system at Frankfurt or Heathrow. When, however, the evidence regarding the clothing, the purchaser, and the timer is taken with the evidence that an unaccompanied bag was taken from KM180 to PA103A, the inference that that was the primary suitcase becomes, in our view, irresistible. As we have also said, the absence of an explanation as to how the suitcase was taken into the system at Luqa is a major difficulty for the Crown case, but after taking full account of that difficulty, we remain of the view that the primary suitcase began its journey at Luqa. The clear inference which we draw from this evidence is that the conception, planning and execution of the plot which led to the planting of the explosive device was of Libyan origin. While no doubt organisations such as the PFLP-GC and the PPSF were also engaged in terrorist activities during the same period, we are satisfied that there was no evidence from which we could infer that they were involved in this particular act of terrorism, and the evidence relating to their activities does not create a reasonable doubt in our minds about the Libyan origin of this crime.

=== Appeal ===
The defence team had fourteen days in which to appeal against Megrahi's conviction, and an additional six weeks to submit the full grounds of the appeal. These were considered by a judge sitting in private who decided to grant Megrahi leave to appeal. The only basis for an appeal under Scots law is that a "miscarriage of justice" had occurred, which is not defined in statute, so the appeal court must determine the meaning of these words in each case. Because three judges and one substitute judge had presided over the trial, five judges were required to preside over the Court of Criminal Appeal: Lord Cullen, Lord Justice-General, Lord Kirkwood, Lord Osborne, Lord Macfadyen, and Lord Nimmo Smith.

In what was described as a milestone in Scottish legal history, Lord Cullen granted the BBC permission in January 2002 to televise the appeal, and to broadcast it on the Internet in English with a simultaneous Arabic translation.

William Taylor, leading the defence, said at the appeal's opening on 23 January 2002 that the three trial judges sitting without a jury had failed to see the relevance of "significant" evidence and had accepted unreliable facts. He argued that the verdict was not one that a reasonable jury in an ordinary trial could have reached if it were given proper directions by the judge. The grounds of the appeal rested on two areas of evidence where the defence claimed the original court was mistaken: the evidence of Maltese shopkeeper, Tony Gauci, which the judges accepted as sufficient to prove that the "primary suitcase" started its journey in Malta; and, disputing the prosecution's case, fresh evidence would be adduced to show that the bomb's journey actually started at Heathrow. That evidence, which was not heard at the trial, showed that at some time in the two hours before 00:35 on 21 December 1988, a padlock had been forced on a secure door giving access air side in Terminal 3 of Heathrow airport, near to the area referred to at the trial as the "baggage build-up area". Taylor claimed that the PA 103 bomb could have been planted then.

On 14 March 2002, Lord Cullen took less than three minutes to deliver the decision of the High Court of Judiciary. The five judges rejected the appeal, ruling unanimously that "none of the grounds of appeal was well-founded", adding "this brings proceedings to an end". The following day, a helicopter took Megrahi from Camp Zeist to continue his life sentence in Barlinnie Prison, Glasgow.

=== SCCRC review ===
Megrahi's lawyers applied to the Scottish Criminal Cases Review Commission (SCCRC) on 23 September 2003 to have his case referred back to the Court of Criminal Appeal for a fresh appeal against conviction. The application to the SCCRC followed the publication of two reports in February 2001 and March 2002 by Hans Köchler, who had been an international observer at Camp Zeist, appointed by the Secretary-General of the United Nations. Köchler described the decisions of the trial and appeal courts as a "spectacular miscarriage of justice". Köchler also issued a series of statements in 2003, 2005, and 2007 calling for an independent international inquiry into the case and accusing the West of "double standards in criminal justice" in relation to the Lockerbie trial on the one hand and the HIV trial in Libya on the other.

On 28 June 2007, the SCCRC announced its decision to refer Megrahi's case to the High Court for a second appeal against conviction. The SCCRC's decision was based on facts set out in an 800-page report that determined that "a miscarriage of justice may have occurred". Köchler criticized the SCCRC for exonerating police, prosecutors and forensic staff from blame in respect of Megrahi's alleged wrongful conviction. He told The Herald of 29 June 2007: "No officials to be blamed, simply a Maltese shopkeeper." Köchler also highlighted the role of intelligence services in the trial and stated that proper judicial proceedings could not be conducted under conditions in which extrajudicial forces are allowed to intervene.

=== Second appeal ===
A procedural hearing at the Appeal Court took place on 11 October 2007 when prosecution lawyers and Megrahi's defense counsel, Maggie Scott QC, discussed a number of legal issues with a panel of three judges. One of the issues concerned a number of documents that were shown before the trial to the prosecution, but were not disclosed to the defense. The documents are understood to relate to the Mebo MST-13 timer that allegedly detonated the PA103 bomb. Maggie Scott also asked for documents relating to an alleged payment of $2 million made to Maltese merchant, Tony Gauci, for his testimony at the trial, which led to the conviction of Megrahi.

On 15 October 2008, five Scottish judges decided unanimously to reject a submission by the Crown Office, which sought to limit the scope of Megrahi's second appeal to the specific grounds of appeal that were identified by the SCCRC in June 2007. In January 2009, it was reported that, although Megrahi's second appeal against conviction was scheduled to begin in April 2009, the hearing could last as long as 12 months because of the complexity of the case and volume of material to be examined. The second appeal began on 28 April 2009, lasted for one month and was adjourned in May 2009. On 7 July 2009, the court reassembled for a procedural hearing and was told that because of the illness of one of the judges, Lord Wheatley, who was recovering from heart surgery, the final two substantive appeal sessions would run from 2 November to 11 December 2009, and 12 January to 26 February 2010. Megrahi's lawyer Maggie Scott expressed dismay at the delays: "There is a very serious danger that my client will die before the case is determined."

=== Compassionate release and controversy ===
On 25 July 2009, Megrahi applied to be released from jail on compassionate grounds. Three weeks later, on 12 August 2009, Megrahi applied to have his second appeal dropped and was granted compassionate release for his terminal prostate cancer. On 20 August 2009, Megrahi was released from prison and traveled by chartered jet to Libya. His survival beyond the approximate "three-month" prognosis generated some controversy. It is believed that, following his release, Al-Megrahi was prescribed abiraterone and prednisone, a combination that extends median survival by an average of 14.8 months. After hospital treatment ended, he returned to his family home. Following his release, Megrahi published evidence on the internet that was gathered for the abandoned second appeal which he claimed would clear his name.

Allegations have been made that the UK government and BP sought Al-Megrahi's release as part of a trade deal with Libya. In 2008, the UK government "decided to 'do all it could' to help the Libyans get Al-Megrahi home ... and explained the legal procedure for compassionate release to the Libyans."

Megrahi was released on licence, so was obliged to remain in regular contact with East Renfrewshire Council. On 26 August 2011, it was announced that the whereabouts of Al-Megrahi were unknown due to the social upheaval in Libya and that he had not been in contact for some time. On 29 August, it was reported that he had been located and both the Scottish government and the council issued a statement confirming that they had been in contact with his family and that his licence had not been breached. Member of Parliament (MP) Andrew Mitchell said Al-Megrahi was comatose and near death. CNN reporter Nic Robertson said he was "just a shell of the man he once was" and was surviving on oxygen and an intravenous drip. In an interview on BBC Radio 5 Live, former US ambassador to the United Nations John Bolton called for Al-Megrahi to be extradited.

To me it will be a signal of how serious the rebel government is for good relations with the United States and the West if they hand over Megrahi for trial.

Mohammed al-Alagi, justice minister for the new leadership in Tripoli, said "the council would not allow any Libyan to be deported to face trial in another country ... Abdelbaset al-Megrahi has already been judged once, and will not be judged again." Megrahi died of prostate cancer in Libya on 20 May 2012. Scottish First Minister Alex Salmond said that people should use the occasion to remember the Lockerbie victims.

== 2020 indictment ==
In 2020, US authorities indicted Libyan national Abu Agila Mohammad Mas'ud Kheir Al-Marimi for participating in the bombing. In December 2022, the United States government obtained custody of 71-year-old Mas'ud.

According to The New York Times, Mas'ud was born in Tunisia in 1951, before he became a citizen of Libya as a child after he moved to Tripoli, Libya. Beginning at the age of 22 in 1973, he began working with bombs for the Libyan intelligence service for the next 38 years. Shortly after finishing his longtime run at the job, Mas'ud was arrested and imprisoned in Misurata, Libya before being moved to Al-Hadba prison in Tripoli, which happened shortly after the fall of Gaddafi in 2011.

After the United States government obtained custody of Mas'ud, heads of the Defense and Foreign Affairs Committees of the Libyan Parliament, Talal al-Mihoub and Youssef al-Aqouri, demanded an urgent investigation into the extradition of Mas'ud, calling it a blatant violation of national sovereignty and an infringement of the rights of the Libyan citizen. They stressed that the case file had been completely closed politically and legally, according to the text of the agreement signed between the United States and Libya in 2003.

His federal trial was scheduled to start on 27 August 2026, but was delayed two days before it was due to begin following the discovery of new evidence. A hearing on the unspecified new evidence was scheduled for 1 September 2026.

== Alleged motives ==
=== Libya ===
Gulf of Sidra

In 2003, Libya agreed to pay the victims of the bombing; it did not accept responsibility. Felicity Barringer of The New York Times said that Libya's letter to the UN had "general language that lacked any expression of remorse for the 270 lives lost". The motive that is generally attributed to Libya can be traced back to a series of military confrontations with the US Navy that took place in the 1980s in the Gulf of Sidra, the whole of which Libya claimed as its territorial waters. First, there was the Gulf of Sidra incident (1981) when two Libyan fighter aircraft were shot down by two US Navy F-14 Tomcat fighters. Then, two Libyan radio ships were sunk in the Gulf of Sidra. Later, on 23 March 1986, a Libyan Navy patrol boat was sunk in the Gulf of Sidra, followed by the sinking of another Libyan vessel on 25 March 1986. The Libyan leader, Muammar Gaddafi, was accused by the US government of retaliating for these sinkings by ordering the April 1986 bombing of La Belle, a West Berlin nightclub frequented by US military personnel, killing three people and injuring 230.

The US National Security Agency's (NSA) alleged interception of an incriminatory message from Libya to its embassy in East Berlin provided US President Ronald Reagan with the justification for Operation El Dorado Canyon on 15 April 1986, with US Navy and US Marine Corps warplanes launching from three aircraft carriers in the Gulf of Sidra and US Air Force warplanes launching from two British bases—the first US military strikes from Britain since World War II—against Tripoli and Benghazi in Libya. The Libyan government claimed the air strikes killed Hana Gaddafi, Gaddifi's alleged adopted daughter, although her death is heavily disputed.

To avenge his daughter's supposed death, Gaddafi is said to have sponsored the September 1986 hijacking of Pan Am Flight 73 in Karachi, Pakistan.

In turn, the US aided and encouraged the Chadian National Armed Forces (FANT) by supplying them with satellite intelligence during the Battle of Maaten al-Sarra. The attack resulted in a devastating defeat for Gaddafi's forces, following which he had to accede to a ceasefire ending the Chadian-Libyan conflict and his dreams of African dominance. Gaddafi blamed the defeat on French and US "aggression against Libya". The result was Gaddafi's lingering animosity against the two countries which may have led to Libyan support for the bombings of Pan Am Flight 103 and UTA Flight 772.

=== Demands for independent inquiry ===
Prior to the abandonment of Megrahi's second appeal against conviction and while new evidence could be still tested in court, there had been few calls for an independent inquiry into the Lockerbie bombing. Demands for such an inquiry emerged later, and became more insistent. On 2 September 2009, former Member of the European Parliament (MEP) Michael McGowan demanded that the UK government call for an urgent, independent inquiry led by the UN to find out the truth about Pan Am flight 103. "We owe it to the families of the victims of Lockerbie and the international community to identify those responsible," McGowan said. Two online petitions were started: one calling for a UK public inquiry into the Lockerbie bombing; the other a UN inquiry into the murder of UN Commissioner for Namibia, Bernt Carlsson, in the 1988 Lockerbie bombing. In September 2009, a third petition which was addressed to the President of the United Nations General Assembly demanded that the UN should "institute a full public inquiry" into the Lockerbie disaster.

On 3 October 2009, Malta was asked to table a UN resolution supporting the petition, which was signed by 20 people including the families of the Lockerbie victims, authors, journalists, professors, politicians and parliamentarians, as well as Archbishop Desmond Tutu. The signatories considered that a UN inquiry could help remove "many of the deep misgivings which persist in lingering over this tragedy" and could also eliminate Malta from this terrorist act. Malta was brought into the case because the prosecution argued that the two accused Libyans, Abdelbaset al-Megrahi and Lamin Khalifah Fhimah, had placed the bomb on an Air Malta aircraft before it was transferred at Frankfurt airport to a feeder flight destined for London's Heathrow airport, from which Pan Am Flight 103 departed. The Maltese government responded saying that the demand for a UN inquiry was "an interesting development that would be deeply considered, although there were complex issues surrounding the event."

On 24 August 2009, Lockerbie campaigner Dr Jim Swire wrote to Prime Minister, Gordon Brown, calling for a full inquiry, including the question of suppression of the Heathrow evidence. This was backed up by a delegation of Lockerbie relatives, led by Pamela Dix, who went to 10 Downing Street on 24 October 2009 and handed over a letter addressed to Gordon Brown calling for a meeting with the Prime Minister to discuss the need for a public inquiry and the main issues that it should address. An op-ed article by Pamela Dix, subtitled "The families of those killed in the bombing have not given up hope of an inquiry to help us learn the lessons of this tragedy", was published in The Guardian on 26 October 2009. On 1 November 2009, it was reported that Gordon Brown had ruled out a public inquiry into Lockerbie, saying in response to Dr Swire's letter: "I understand your desire to understand the events surrounding the bombing of Pan Am flight 103 but I do not think it would be appropriate for the UK government to open an inquiry of this sort." UK ministers explained that it was for the Scottish Government to decide if it wanted to hold its own, more limited, inquiry into the terrorist attack. The Scottish Government had already rejected an independent inquiry, saying it lacks the constitutional power to examine the international dimensions of the case.

Concluding his extensive reply dated 27 October 2009 to the Prime Minister, Dr Swire said:

You have now received a much more comprehensive letter requesting a full inquiry from our group 'UK Families-Flight 103'. I am one of the signatories. I hope that the contents of this letter underline some of the reasons as to why I cannot possibly accept that any inquiry should be limited to Scotland, and I apologise if my previous personal letter of 24 August misled you over the main focus that the inquiry will need to address. That focus lies in London and at the door of the then inhabitant of Number 10 Downing Street. I look forward to hearing your comments both to our group's letter and to the contents of this one.

=== Claims of Gaddafi involvement ===
On 23 February 2011, amidst the Libyan Civil War, Mustafa Abdul Jalil, former Libyan Justice Minister (and later member and Chairman of the anti-Gaddafi National Transitional Council), alleged that he had evidence that Libyan leader, Muammar Gaddafi, had personally ordered Abdelbaset al-Megrahi to bomb Pan Am Flight 103.

In a July 2021 interview, Gaddafi's son Saif al-Islam said that his father "had stopped riding his horse after the humiliation of the American bombing of Tripoli in 1986 and resumed riding it after the Lockerbie bombing."

=== PCAST statement ===
On 29 September 1989, President Bush appointed Ann McLaughlin Korologos, former Secretary of Labor, to chair the President's Commission on Aviation Security and Terrorism (PCAST) to review and report on aviation security policy in the light of the sabotage of flight PA103. Oliver Revell, the FBI's Executive Assistant Director, was assigned to advise and assist PCAST in their task.

Before they submitted their report, the PCAST members met a group of British PA103 relatives at the US embassy in London on 12 February 1990. One of the British relatives, Martin Cadman, alleges that a member of President Bush's staff told him: "Your government and ours know exactly what happened but they are never going to tell." The statement first came to public attention in the 1994 documentary film The Maltese Double Cross – Lockerbie and was published in both The Guardian of 12 November 1994, and a special report from Private Eye magazine entitled Lockerbie, the flight from justice May/June 2001.

== Compensation ==
=== From Libya ===
On 29 May 2002, Libya offered up to US$2.7 billion to settle claims by the families of the 270 killed in the Lockerbie bombing, representing US$10 million per family. The Libyan offer was that 40% of the money would be released when United Nations sanctions, suspended in 1999, were canceled; another 40% when US trade sanctions were lifted; the final 20% when the US State Department removed Libya from its list of states sponsoring terrorism.

Jim Kreindler of the New York law firm Kreindler & Kreindler, which orchestrated the settlement, said: "These are uncharted waters. It is the first time that any of the states designated as sponsors of terrorism have offered compensation to families of terror victims." The US State Department maintained that it was not directly involved. "Some families want cash, others say it is blood money", said a State Department official.

Compensation for the families of the PA103 victims was among the steps set by the UN for lifting its sanctions against Libya. Other requirements included a formal denunciation of terrorism—which Libya said it had already made—and "accepting responsibility for the actions of its officials". On 15 August 2003, Libya's UN ambassador, Ahmed Own, submitted a letter to the UN Security Council formally accepting "responsibility for the actions of its officials" in relation to the Lockerbie bombing. Nevertheless, the then Prime minister of Libya, Shukri Ghanem rejected the claims of responsibility for the bombing. Ghanem added that Libya had paid damages to victims of the Lockerbie victims in order to "buy peace".

The Libyan government then proceeded to pay compensation to each family of US$8 million (from which legal fees of about US$2.5 million were deducted) and, as a result, the UN canceled the sanctions that had been suspended four years earlier, and US trade sanctions were lifted. A further US$2 million would have gone to each family had the US State Department removed Libya from its list of states regarded as supporting international terrorism, but as this did not happen by the deadline set by Libya, the Libyan Central Bank withdrew the remaining US$540 million in April 2005 from the escrow account in Switzerland through which the earlier US$2.16 billion compensation for the victims' families had been paid. The United States announced resumption of full diplomatic relations with Libya after deciding to remove it from its list of countries that support terrorism on 15 May 2006.

On 24 February 2004, Libyan Prime Minister Shukri Ghanem stated in a BBC Radio 4 interview that his country had paid the compensation as the "price for peace" and to secure the lifting of sanctions. Asked if Libya did not accept guilt, he said, "I agree with that." He also said there was no evidence to link Libya with the April 1984 shooting of police officer Yvonne Fletcher outside the Libyan Embassy in London. Gaddafi later retracted Ghanem's comments, under pressure from Washington and London.

A civil action against Libya continued until 18 February 2005 on behalf of Pan Am and its insurers, which went bankrupt partly as a result of the attack. The airline was seeking $4.5 billion for the loss of the aircraft and the effect on the airline's business.

In the wake of the SCCRC's June 2007 decision, there have been suggestions that, if Megrahi's second appeal had been successful and his conviction had been overturned, Libya could have sought to recover the $2.16 billion compensation paid to the relatives. Interviewed by French newspaper Le Figaro on 7 December 2007, Saif al-Islam Gaddafi said that the seven Libyans convicted for the Pan Am Flight 103 and the UTA Flight 772 bombings "are innocent". When asked if Libya would therefore seek reimbursement of the compensation paid to the families of the victims (US$33 billion in total), Saif Gaddafi replied: "I don't know".

Following discussions in London in May 2008, US and Libyan officials agreed to start negotiations to resolve all outstanding bilateral compensation claims, including those relating to UTA Flight 772, the 1986 Berlin discotheque bombing and Pan Am Flight 103. On 14 August 2008, a US-Libya compensation deal was signed in Tripoli by US Assistant Secretary of State David Welch and Libya's Foreign Ministry head of America affairs, Ahmed al-Fatroui. The agreement covers 26 lawsuits filed by American citizens against Libya, and three by Libyan citizens in respect of the US bombing of Tripoli and Benghazi in April 1986 which killed at least 40 people and injured 220. In October 2008 Libya paid $1.5 billion into a fund which will be used to compensate relatives of these groups:

1. Lockerbie bombing victims with the remaining 20% of the sum agreed in 2003;
2. American victims of the 1986 Berlin discotheque bombing;
3. American victims of the 1989 UTA Flight 772 bombing; and,
4. Libyan victims of the 1986 US bombing of Tripoli and Benghazi.

As a result, President Bush signed Executive Order 13477 restoring the Libyan government's immunity from terror-related lawsuits and dismissing all of the pending compensation cases in the US, the White House said. US State Department spokesman, Sean McCormack, called the move a "laudable milestone ... clearing the way for a continued and expanding US-Libyan partnership."

In an interview shown in BBC Two's The Conspiracy Files: Lockerbie on 31 August 2008, Saif Gaddafi said that Libya had admitted responsibility for the Lockerbie bombing simply to get trade sanctions removed. He went on to describe the families of the Lockerbie victims as very greedy: "They were asking for more money and more money and more money". Several of the victims families refused to accept compensation due to their belief that Libya was not responsible.

==== February 2011 ====
In an interview with Swedish newspaper Expressen on 23 February 2011, Mustafa Abdul Jalil, former Justice Secretary of Libya, claimed to have evidence that Gaddafi personally ordered Al-Megrahi to carry out the bombing.

Quotes: "[Jalil] told Expressen Khadafy [sic] gave the order to Abdel Baset al-Megrahi, the only man convicted in the bombing of Pan Am Flight 103 over Lockerbie, Scotland, which killed all 259 people on board and 11 on the ground on 21 December 1988. 'To hide it, he (Khadafy) did everything in his power to get al-Megrahi back from Scotland,' Abdel-Jalil was quoted as saying."

Al Jalil's commentary to the Expressen came during widespread political unrest and protests in Libya calling for the removal of Ghaddafi from power. The protests were part of a massive wave of unprecedented uprisings across the Arab world in Tunisia, Morocco, Bahrain and Egypt, where Egyptian protesters effectively forced the removal of long-term ruler, Hosni Mubarak, from office. Jalil's comments came on a day when Ghaddafi's defiance and refusal to leave his command prompted his brutal attacks on Libyan protesters.

Abdel-Jalil stepped down as minister of justice in protest over the violence against anti-government demonstrations.

==== Contingency fees for lawyers ====
On 5 December 2003, Jim Kreindler revealed that his Park Avenue law firm would receive an initial contingency fee of around US$1 million from each of the 128 American families Kreindler represents. The firm's fees could exceed US$300 million eventually. Kreindler argued that the fees were justified, since "Over the past seven years we have had a dedicated team working tirelessly on this and we deserve the contingency fee we have worked so hard for, and I think we have provided the relatives with value for money."

Another top legal firm in the US, Speiser Krause, which represented 60 relatives, of whom half were UK families, concluded contingency deals securing them fees of between 28 and 35% of individual settlements. Frank Granito of Speiser Krause noted that "the rewards in the US are more substantial than anywhere else in the world but nobody has questioned the fee whilst the work has been going on, it is only now as we approach a resolution when the criticism comes your way."

In March 2009, it was announced that US lobbying firm, Quinn Gillespie & Associates, received fees of $2 million for the work it did from 2006 through 2008 helping the PA103 relatives obtain payment by Libya of the final $2 million compensation (out of a total of $10 million) that was due to each family.

=== From Pan Am ===
In 1992, a US federal court found Pan Am guilty of willful misconduct due to relaxed security screening caused by failure to implement baggage reconciliation, a new security program mandated by the FAA prior to the incident, which requires unaccompanied luggage to be searched by hand and to ensure passengers board flights onto which they have checked baggage; Pan Am relied more on the less-effective method of X-ray screening. Two of Pan Am's subsidiaries, Alert Management Inc., which handled Pan Am's security at foreign airports, and Pan American World Services, were also found guilty.

== Memorials and tributes ==
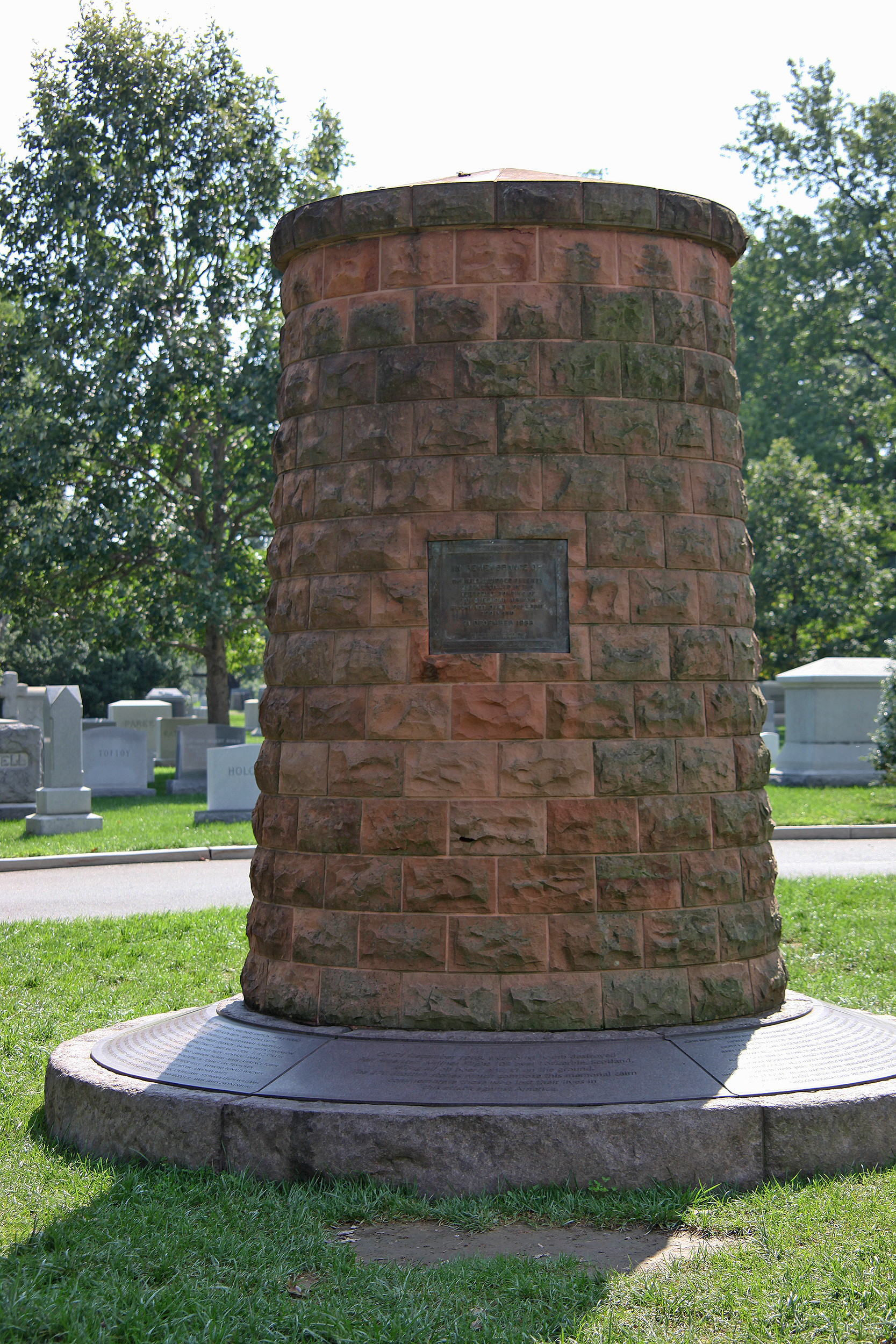
Lockerbie Cairn in Arlington National Cemetery, US

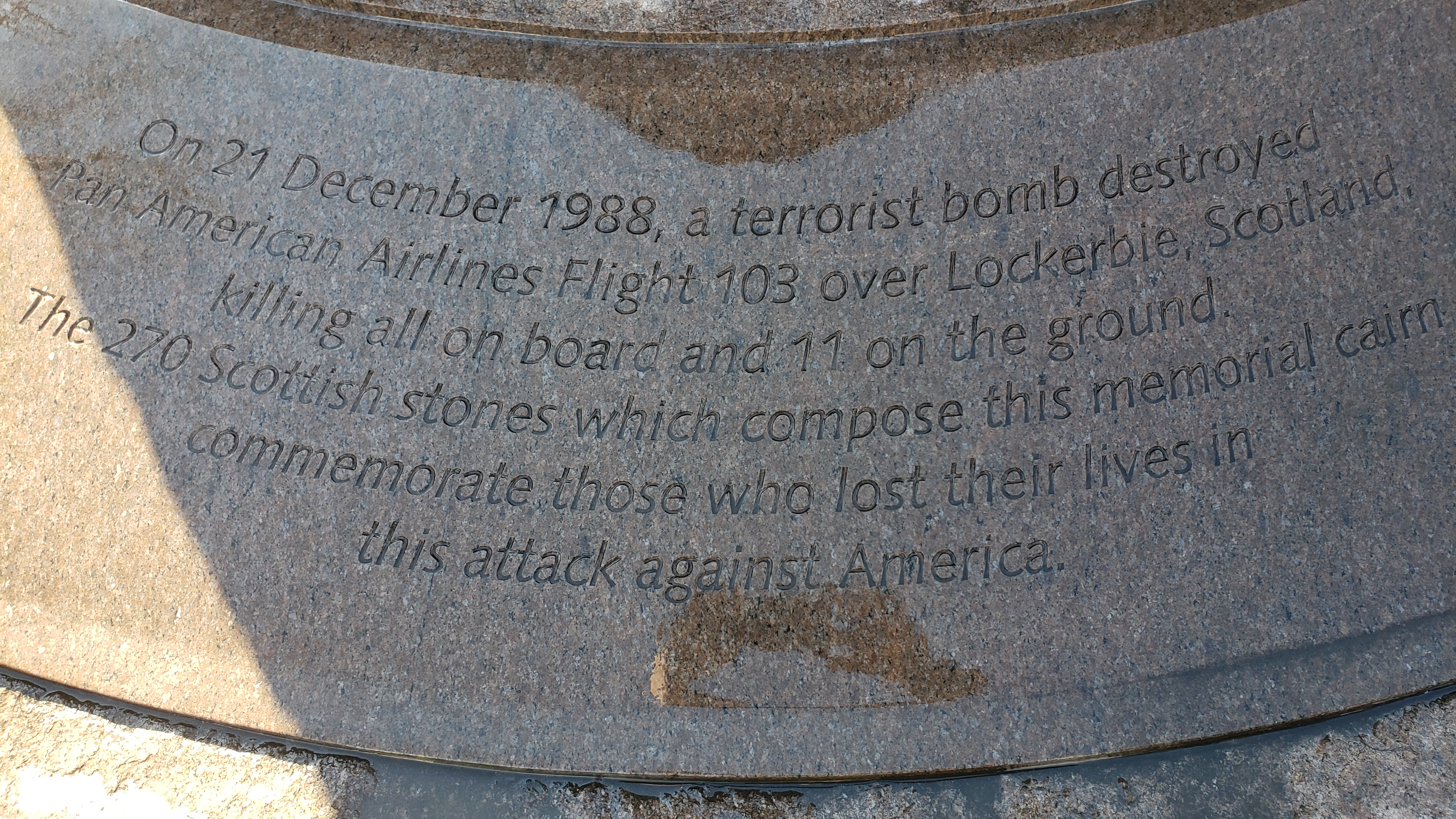
Inscription on memorial at Arlington National Cemetery

There are several private and public memorials to the PA103 victims. Dark Elegy is the work of sculptor Suse Lowenstein of Long Island, whose son Alexander, then 21, was a passenger on the flight. The work consists of 43 nude statues of the wives and mothers who lost a husband or a child. Inside each sculpture there is a personal memento of the victim.

=== United States ===
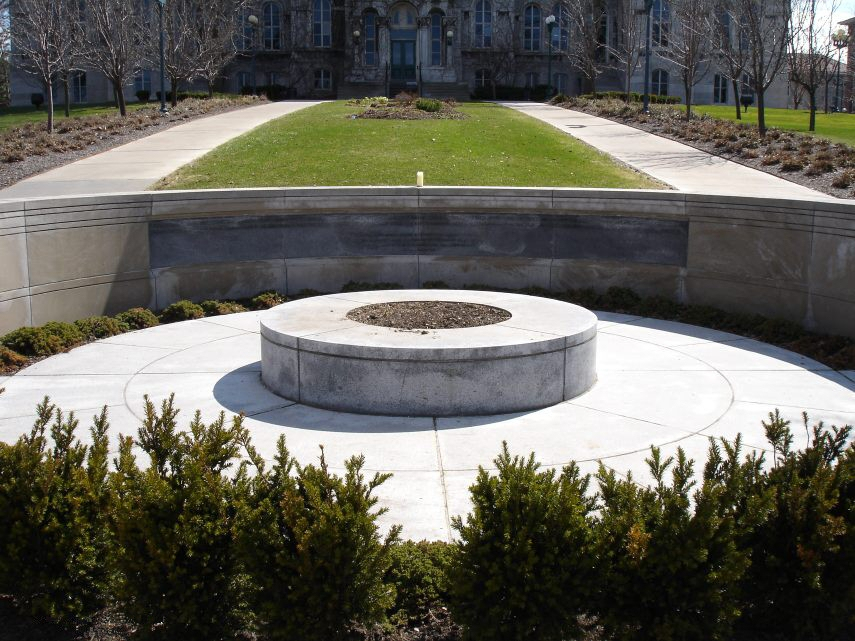
Syracuse University's memorial in Syracuse, New York.

On 3 November 1995, then–US President Bill Clinton dedicated a Memorial Cairn to the victims at Arlington National Cemetery, and there are similar memorials at Syracuse University; Dryfesdale Cemetery, near Lockerbie; and in Sherwood Crescent, Lockerbie.

Syracuse University holds a memorial week every year called "Remembrance Week" to commemorate its 35 lost students. Every 21 December, a service is held in the university's chapel at 14:03 (19:03 UTC), marking the moment the bomb on board the aircraft was detonated. The university also awards university tuition fees to two students from Lockerbie Academy each year, in the form of its Lockerbie scholarship. In addition, the university annually awards 35 scholarships to seniors to honor each of the 35 students killed. The "Remembrance Scholarships" are among the highest honors a Syracuse undergraduate can receive. SUNY Oswego also gives out scholarships in memorial of Colleen Brunner to a student who is studying abroad. A memorial plaque and garden in memory of its two students lost in the bombing is set in the University of Rochester's Eastman Quadrangle.

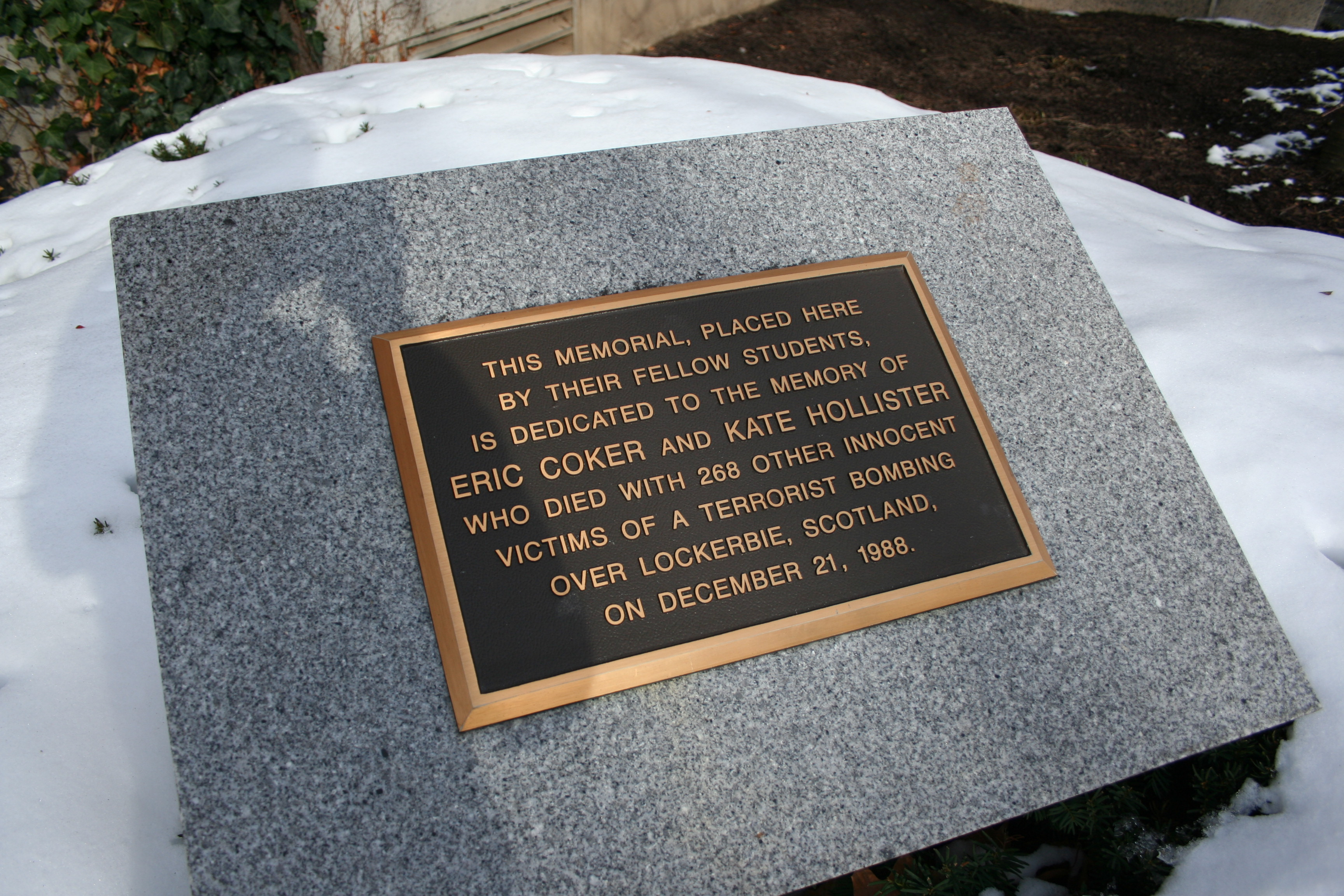
Memorial plaque in honour of Eric Coker and Katharine Hollister, Eastman Quadrangle, University of Rochester

At Cornell University, funds from the Libyan payment were used to establish a memorial professorship in honor of student Kenneth J. Bissett.

==== The Women of Lockerbie ====
The Women of Lockerbie (2003) is a play written by Deborah Brevoort which depicts a woman from New Jersey roaming the hills of Lockerbie, Scotland. This mother lost her son in the bombing of the Pan Am Flight 103. While in Lockerbie, seven years after the flight, she meets the women who witnessed and were affected by the crash itself while she attempts to find closure. This play has received the Silver Medal from the Onassis International Playwriting Competition and the Kennedy Center Fund for New American Plays award.

=== Lockerbie ===
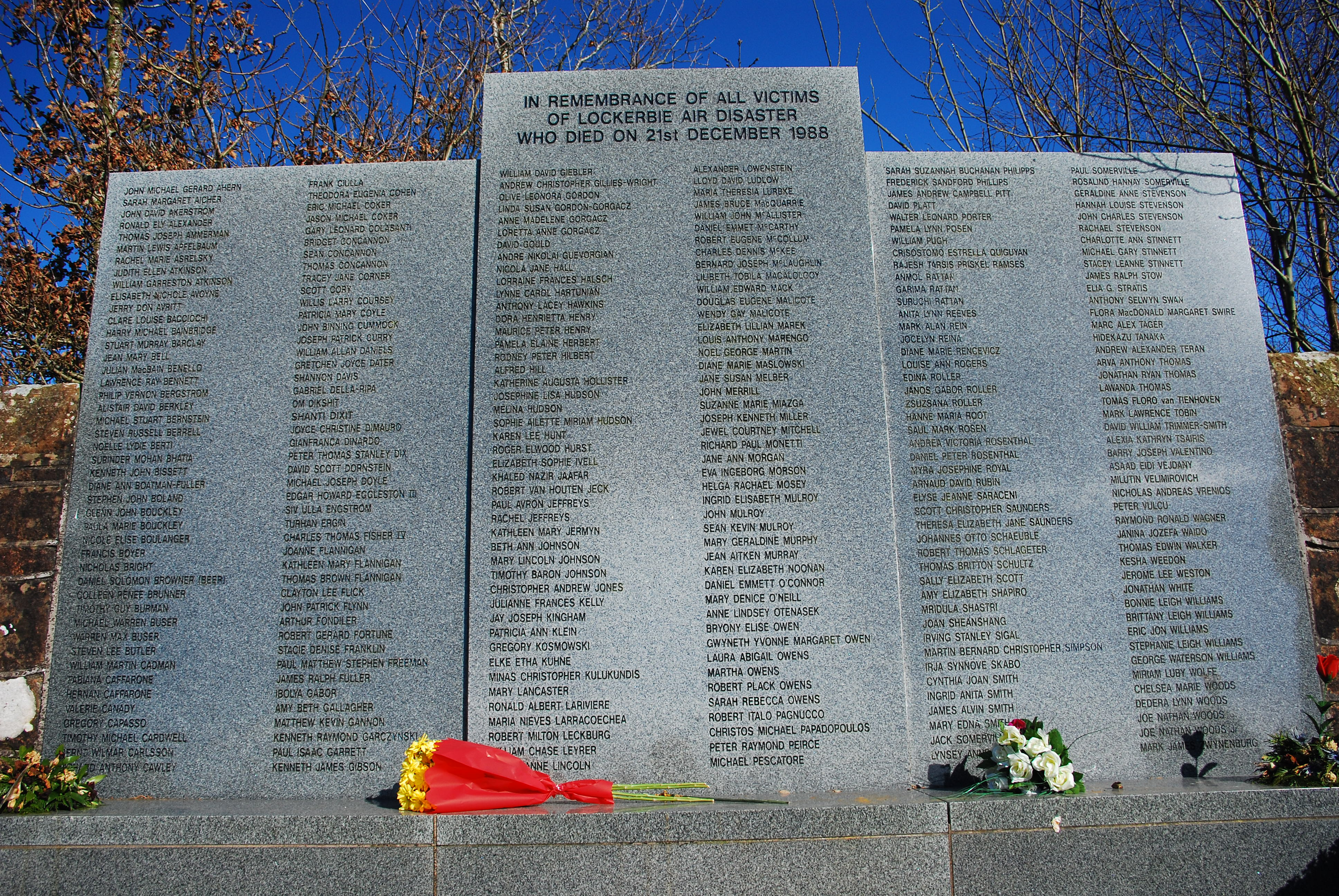
Memorial at Dryfesdale Cemetery

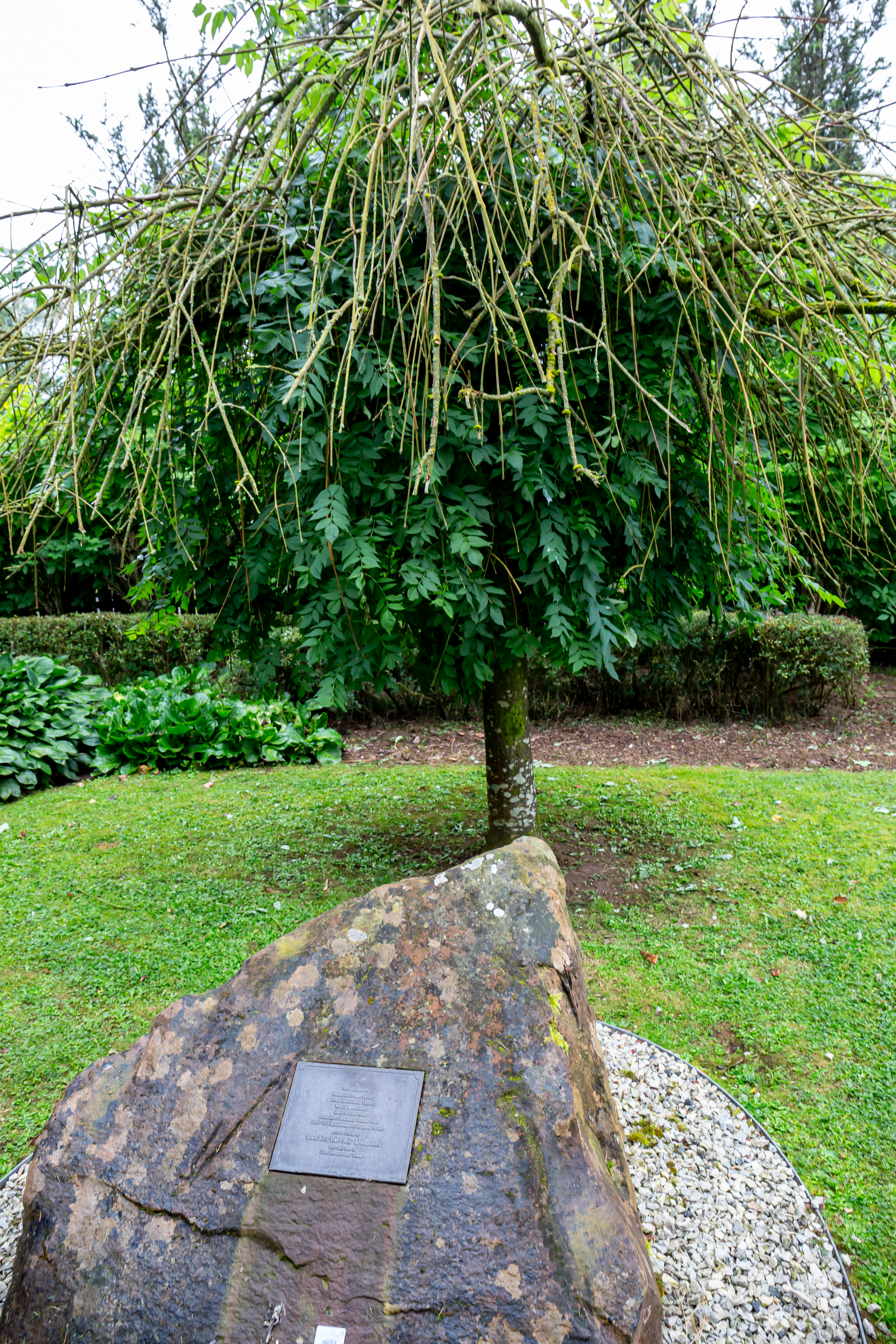
Memorial in Sherwood Crescent

The main UK memorial is at Dryfesdale Cemetery about one mile (1.5 kilometres) west of Lockerbie. There is a semicircular stone wall in the garden of remembrance with the names and nationalities of all the victims along with individual funeral stones and memorials. Inside the chapel at Dryfesdale there is a book of remembrance. There are memorials in Lockerbie and Moffat Roman Catholic churches, where plaques list the names of all 270 victims. In Lockerbie Town Hall Council Chambers, there is a stained-glass window depicting flags of the 21 countries whose citizens lost their lives in the disaster. There is also a book of remembrance at Lockerbie public library and another at Tundergarth Church. In Sherwood Crescent there is a garden of remembrance to the seven Lockerbie residents killed when the aircraft's main wreckage fell there, destroying their homes.

=== Carfin Grotto chapel ===
A chapel at Carfin Grotto was dedicated in June 1989 to the victims of the bombing. Daily Mass is now celebrated in this glass chapel, now named Our Lady, Maid of the Seas after the ill-fated aircraft.

== Wreckage of the aircraft ==
The Air Accidents Investigation Branch reassembled a large part of the fuselage to aid with the investigation; this has been retained as evidence and stored in a hangar at Farnborough Airport since the bombing.

In 2008, the remaining wreckage of the aircraft was being stored at a scrapyard near Tattershall, Lincolnshire, pending the conclusion of the American victims' civil case and further legal proceedings. The remains include the nose section of the Boeing 747, which was cut into several pieces to assist in removal from Tundergarth Hill.

It was announced in April 2013 that part of the wreckage was transferred to a secure location in Dumfries, Scotland, and that it remains evidence in the ongoing criminal investigation.

A section of the aircraft's wreckage, including parts of the fuselage, was announced as being transported to the US in December 2024, as evidence in a new trial against Abu Agila Masud. The trial was set to begin in May 2025, but was postponed to April 2026 due to the case's complexity of international evidence and the defendant's ongoing health issues.

== In popular culture ==
The Emmerdale plane crash, a storyline in a television show called Emmerdale in 1993, received complaints due to its similarity to the event.

The events of Flight 103 were the subject of "Lockerbie Disaster", a 2009 season 7 episode of the Canadian television series Mayday (called Air Emergency and Air Disasters in the US and Air Crash Investigation in the UK and elsewhere around the world). It is also featured in a documentary film titled The Maltese Double Cross – Lockerbie.

A four-part documentary television series Lockerbie was produced by Mindhouse Productions in association with Sky Studios1 and directed by John Dower.

The book The Boy Who Fell Out of the Sky by Ken Dornstein was published about his brother who died in the crash.

The 2025 British drama Lockerbie: A Search for Truth, based on the 2021 book The Lockerbie Bombing: A Father's Search for Justice by Jim Swire and Peter Biddulph, follows the aftermath of the events onboard Flight 103. Later that same year, the BBC miniseries The Bombing of Pan Am 103 was also released, covering the Scottish and FBI investigation of the disaster. It was distributed by Netflix internationally.

British author Philip Nicholson, using the pen name A. J. Quinnell, wrote The Perfect Kill, a 1992 novel in which the main character seeks to avenge the deaths of his wife and daughter on PA103. This novel is a sequel to Man on Fire, a 1980 novel by the same author.

Stardust Crusaders, the third arc of JoJo's Bizarre Adventure, mentions a recent plane crash in Britain that killed approximately 300 people being the result of a stand user. Due to the arc taking place in 1989, it is implied this event was the downing of Pan Am Flight 103.

== See also ==
- Air India Flight 182 – A 747-200 which was bombed by Babbar Khalsa killing all 329 occupants on board.
- Philippine Airlines Flight 434 – A 747-200 Combi which was bombed by Ramzi Yousef as a test for the Bojinka plot. One passenger died from this "test" and several others were injured.
- Alas Chiricanas Flight 00901 – An Embraer EMB 110 which was bombed and resulted in all 21 occupants being killed. American and Panamanian authorities declared it an act of terrorism.
- Libyan Arab Airlines Flight 1103 – A Boeing 727-200 allegedly shot down by order of Muammar Gaddafi in order to show the negative effects of the sanctions which were imposed on Libya after the bombing of Flight 103
- Itavia Flight 870 – A McDonnell Douglas DC-9-15 which was either bombed or was accidentally shot down by the French Air Force while trying to down a MiG jet operated by the Libyan Air Force. All 81 occupants died.
- Metrojet Flight 9268 – An Airbus A321 which was bombed by the Islamic State – Sinai Province killing all 224 occupants on board.
- Libya and state-sponsored terrorism
- List of accidents and incidents involving commercial aircraft
- Timeline of airliner bombing attacks
- Cubana de Aviación Flight 455
- United Air Lines Trip 23 – The first confirmed case of an aircraft bombing. All 7 occupants died.
- Swissair Flight 330 – A Convair 990 that crashed shortly after takeoff when a bomb detonated on board, killing all 47 occupants.
- UTA Flight 772 – A McDonnell Douglas DC-10-30 that experienced an inflight breakup after a bomb detonated on board.
