= Dryfesdale =

Civil parish of the council area of Dumfries and Galloway, Scotland

Coordinates: 55.120°N 3.357°W

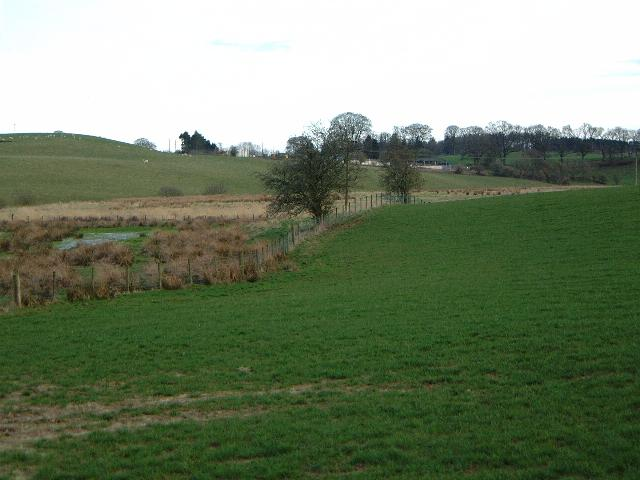
Fields near Lockerbie: marshy area near the remains of a Roman camp.

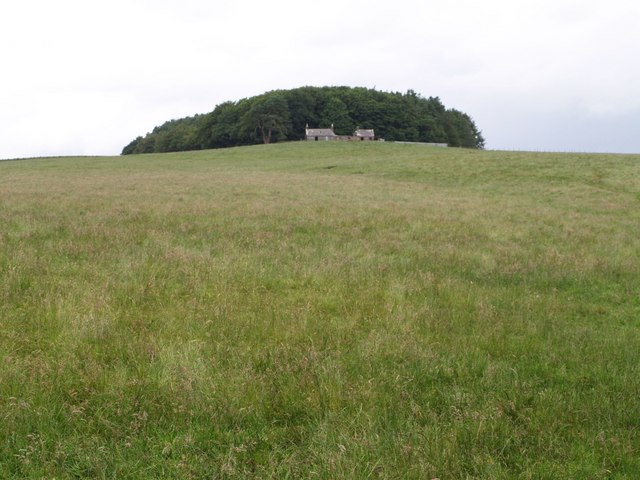
Castlehill: the plantation behind the hilltop farm contains two circular settlement sites, presumably Iron Age. The view is from the corner of Fox Covert, at the edge of Birkshaw Forest.

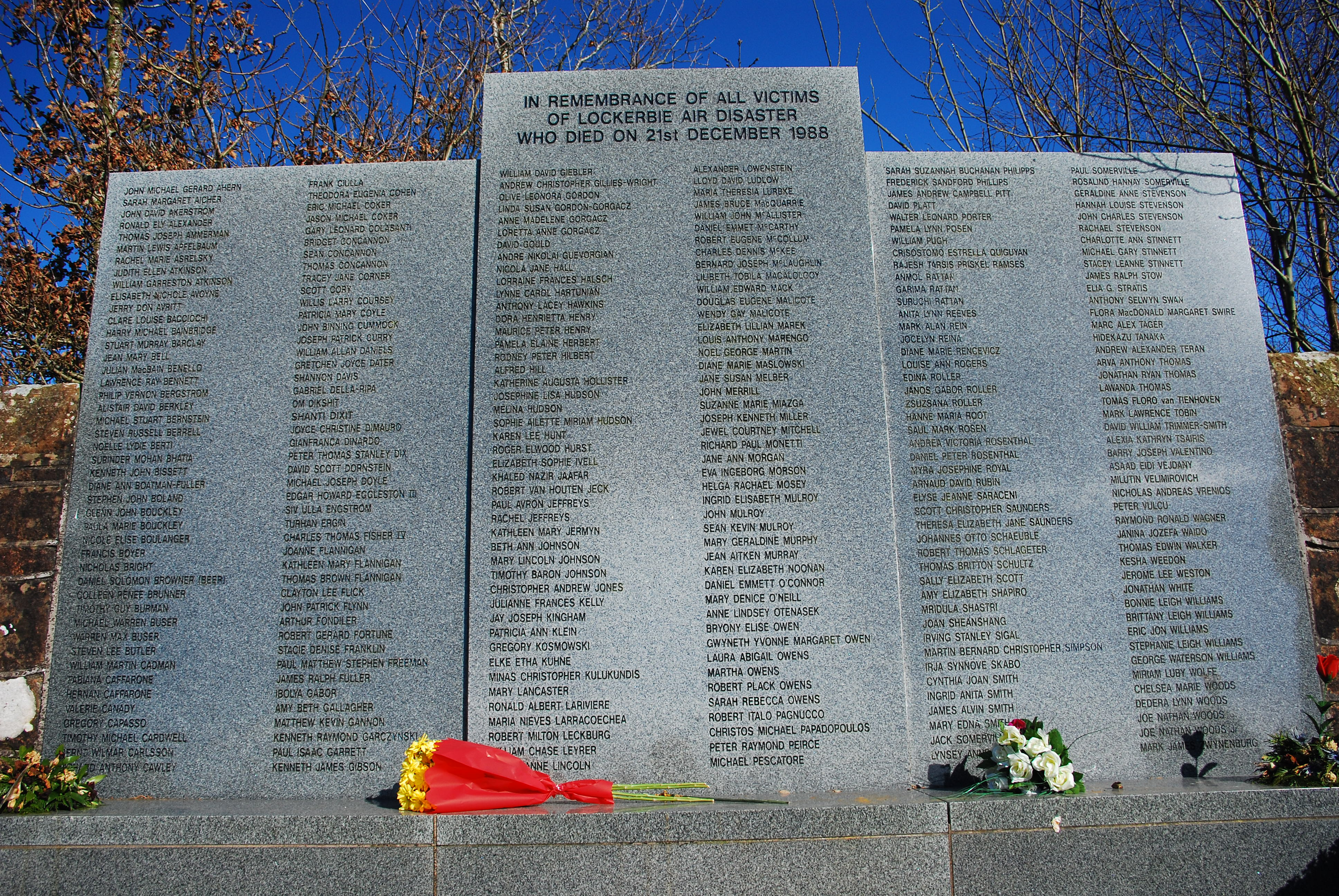
Memorial for the victims of Pan Am Flight 103 (Lockerbie bombing)

Dryfesdale (/ˈdraɪfsdeɪl/ DRYFSE-dayl) is a civil parish of the council area of Dumfries and Galloway, Scotland. It is part of the county of Dumfriesshire.

== Overview ==
The parish church of Dryfesdale, located in the centre of Lockerbie, was dedicated to St Cuthbert. In 1116 it belonged to the See of Galloway.

The civil parish of Dryfesdale includes the town of Lockerbie which has apparently existed since at least the days of Viking influence in this part of Scotland in the period around AD 900. The name derives from the Dryfe Water river and Old English dæl "dale, valley". The presence of the remains of a Roman camp a mile to the west of the town suggests its origins may be even earlier. Lockerbie first entered recorded history, as Lokardebi, in 1306.

Strong old towers were at Netherplace, Old Walls, Kirkton Mains, Myrehead and Daltonhook.

Remains of eight camps, some square or Roman, others circular or Caledonian, occur in different places, chiefly on hilltops. Two of them, Roman and Caledonian, confront each other on hills to the north east of Bengall village.

== Pan Am Flight 103 ==
Dryfesdale Cemetery has the main UK memorial to the victims of the bombing Pan Am Flight 103, which occurred on 21 December 1988, over the town of Lockerbie. There is a semicircular stone wall in the garden of remembrance with the names and nationalities of all the victims along with individual funeral stones and memorials. Inside the chapel there is a book of remembrance.

== See also ==
- List of civil parishes in Scotland
- List of places in Dumfries and Galloway
