= Andrew Halliday (physician) =

Sir Andrew Halliday KH, MD
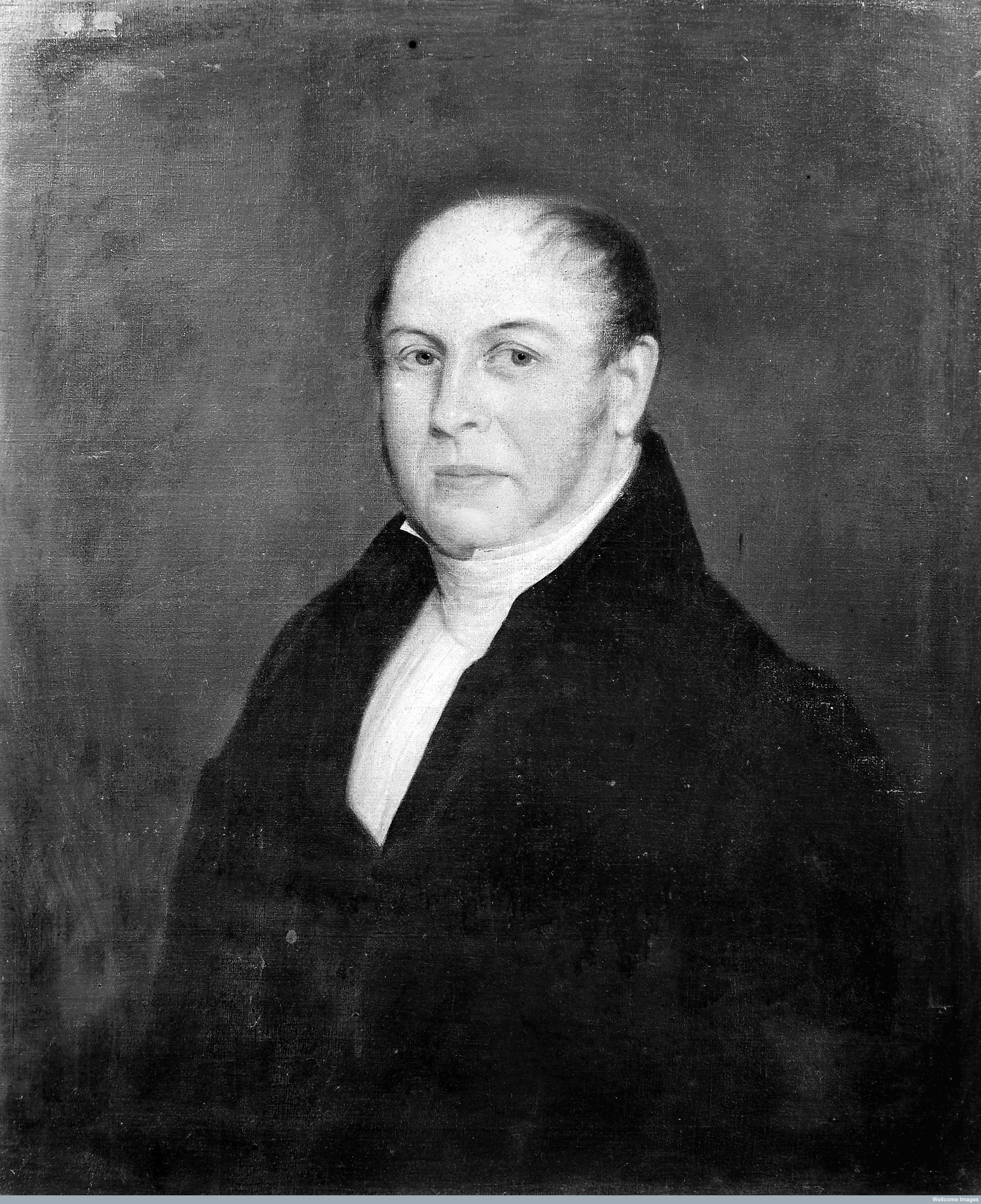
- Source: Wellcome Library, London
- Born: 17 March 1782; Copewood, parish of Dryfesdale, Dumfries, Scotland
- Died: 7 September 1839 (aged 57); Dumfries, Scotland
- Resting place: Saint Michael's, Dumfries, Dumfries and Galloway, UK
- Other name: Andrew Hallidie
- Education: University of Edinburgh
- Occupation: physician
- Years active: 1806-1837
- Known for: Royal physician to William IV and Queen Victoria, military surgeon, author, reformer
- Notable work: Annals of the house of Hanover; A General View of the Present State of Lunatics, and Lunatic Asylums; The West Indies: the Nature and Physical History of the Windward and Leeward Colonies
- Spouse: Helen Carmichael
- Parent(s): Thomas Halliday, esq. and Margaret Porteous
- Relatives: Andrew Smith Hallidie, nephew

Sir Andrew Halliday, KH (also spelt Hallidie; 17 March 1782 in Copewood, parish of Dryfesdale, Dumfries – 7 September 1839 in Dumfries) was a Scottish physician, reformer, and writer.

== Biography ==
He was born in Copeland, Dryfesdale in Dumfriesshire.

When he was nine years old, Halliday had to earn his own living by tending cattle because of his father's financial problems. He later advanced himself by qualifying as a schoolteacher. Halliday subsequently entered the University of Edinburgh and started training for the Presbyterian ministry, but switched to medicine, his preference. He graduated with an MD on 24 June 1806 from the University of Edinburgh with a thesis entitled De pneumatosi that he later published as a book. After travelling in Russia, he set up in practice at Halesowen, Worcestershire.

In 1807, he became a surgeon in the 13th Light Dragoons. Whilst in the British Army, Halliday served in the Napoleonic Wars in Portugal, Spain, and the West Indies, at the Siege of Bergen op Zoom (1814) and the Battle of Waterloo.

He was later the domestic physician to the Duke of Clarence and St Andrews (who became William IV), and traveled on the continent with him. In 1817, he was made a licentiate of the Royal College of Physicians of Edinburgh and, in 1819, of the Royal College of Physicians, London. While traveling on the continent, he became familiar with the medical applications of iodine, introducing it to Britain upon his return in 1819 and publishing an article on it in 1821. He was appointed a Knight of the Royal Guelphic Order in 1820 and a Knight Bachelor in 1821. In August 1827 he was elected a fellow of the Royal College of Physicians of Edinburgh. In 1829, he helped to establish King's College London. He also served as the majesty's justice of the peace for the county of Middlesex.

He was appointed Deputy Inspector-General of hospitals in the West Indies in 1832, but returned to his native Dumfries in 1837 because of ill health. He died at Huntingdon Lodge in Dumfries on 7 September 1839.

Halliday was the first physician to the Seamen's Hospital Society, which was established in 1821 with the purpose of helping people currently or previously employed in the Merchant Navy or fishing fleets. Halliday was the royal physician to William IV and to Queen Victoria. Before and after his military service he publicized the deplorable state of British and Irish insane asylums. He wrote Annals of the house of Hanover and The West Indies: the Nature and Physical History of the Windward and Leeward Colonies, published in 1826 and 1837, respectively.

His nephew, Andrew Smith Hallidie, promoted the Clay Street Hill Railroad in San Francisco, the world's first practical cable car system.

== Bibliography ==
Halliday also contributed obituaries to The Gentleman's Magazine.

== External sources ==
- Radburn, Arthur. "Halliday Heraldry : Scottish arms : gallery". hwmw.net46.net. Archived from the original on 1 March 2014. Shows a picture and a description of Sir Andrew Halliday's coat of arms.
- Urban, Syvanus (pen name), ed. (January 1840). "Sir Andrew Halliday, M.D." Obituary. The Gentleman's Magazine. 2. 13. J. B. Nichols & Son, printers. London, UK: 93–94. OCLC 563914677.
