= Nicholas Koumjian =

Human rights and international criminal law specialist

- Born: United States
- Education: Juris Doctor, Master of Business Administration
- Alma mater: University of North Carolina; University of California, Los Angeles
- Occupations: Prosecutor, International Criminal Law Specialist
- Years active: 35 years
- Known for: Head of the UN Independent Investigative Mechanism for Myanmar; International Co-Prosecutor at the Extraordinary Chambers in the Courts of Cambodia

Nicholas Koumjian is an American prosecutor specializing in international criminal law. He is currently the Head of the United Nations Independent Investigative Mechanism for Myanmar (IIMM) and has held significant roles in multiple international criminal tribunals.

== Early life and education ==
Information on Koumjian's early life is limited. He earned a Juris Doctor from the University of North Carolina and a Master of Business Administration from the University of California, Los Angeles.

== Career ==
Koumjian has over 35 years of prosecutorial experience in both domestic and international courts. He has served in key positions in several international criminal tribunals, contributing to major cases involving war crimes and crimes against humanity.

=== International Criminal Tribunal for the Former Yugoslavia (ICTY) ===
Koumjian worked as a Trial Attorney at the ICTY, where he was involved in cases concerning war crimes committed during the Yugoslav Wars.

=== Bosnia and Herzegovina War Crimes ===
He served as an International Prosecutor in the War Crimes Section of the Prosecutor’s Office for Bosnia and Herzegovina, addressing crimes committed during the Bosnian War.

=== Special Court for Sierra Leone (SCSL) ===
Koumjian held the position of Principal Trial Attorney and Senior Appeals Counsel at the SCSL. He was a key figure in the prosecution of former Liberian President Charles Taylor, who was convicted for aiding and abetting war crimes and crimes against humanity during the Sierra Leone Civil War.

=== Extraordinary Chambers in the Courts of Cambodia (ECCC) ===
From 2013 to 2019, Koumjian was the International Co-Prosecutor at the ECCC, focusing on cases related to the Khmer Rouge regime's crimes.

== Contributions and recognition ==
Koumjian's work has played a role in advancing international criminal justice, particularly in setting legal precedents for the prosecution of war crimes, crimes against humanity, and genocide. His efforts have contributed to accountability measures for international crimes and the protection of human rights.
