= Hans Köchler's Lockerbie trial observer mission =

Hans Köchler's Lockerbie trial observer mission stemmed from the dispute between the United Kingdom, the United States, and Libya concerning arrangements for the trial of two Libyans accused of causing the explosion of Pan Am Flight 103 over Lockerbie on 21 December 1988.

The dispute was resolved on the basis of legally binding United Nations Security Council Resolution 1192 of 27 August 1998.

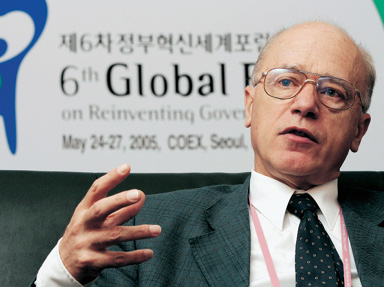
Hans Köchler

== UN-nominated observers ==
UN Security Council resolution 1192 "welcomed" "the initiative for the trial of the two [Libyan] persons charged with the bombing of Pan Am flight 103 ... before a Scottish court sitting in the Netherlands" and "invited" the Secretary-General of the United Nations "to nominate international observers to attend the trial". By a letter dated 28 October 1997, the Permanent Representative of the United Kingdom had informed the Secretary-General "that the United Kingdom would welcome the presence of international observers from the United Nations at the trial of the suspects in the Lockerbie bombing".

In a letter dated 25 April 2000, addressed to the President of the Security Council, Secretary-General Kofi Annan nominated five international observers, one each from the European Union, the League of Arab States, and jointly from the Organization of African Unity and the Non-Aligned Movement, and two from the International Progress Organization, a Vienna-based NGO in consultative status with the United Nations, among them the organisation's president, Hans Köchler, professor of philosophy at the University of Innsbruck, Austria.

== Reports on the trial and appeal ==
Hans Köchler was the only international observer to submit comprehensive reports on the Lockerbie trial and appeal proceedings to the Secretary-General of the United Nations who, in turn, forwarded them to the Registrar of the Scottish Court in the Netherlands.

Köchler's reports were highly critical of the proceedings and challenged the fairness and impartiality of the High Court of Justiciary. Their publication triggered a large-scale international debate, including in the British House of Commons, about the politicisation of criminal trials in the context of power politics. Köchler had characterised the initial trial verdict of 31 January 2001 (which had led to the acquittal of one of the two accused Libyans) as "inconsistent" and "arbitrary". On the day of the announcement of the appeal verdict (14 March 2002) he described the dismissal of the convicted Libyan national's appeal as a "spectacular miscarriage of justice".

== Second Lockerbie appeal ==
Upon publication on 28 June 2007 of a summary of a report by the Scottish Criminal Cases Review Commission, which took four years to review Abdelbaset al-Megrahi's case and granted him leave for a second appeal against conviction, Köchler issued a statement in which he expressed surprise at the commission's focus and apparent bias in favour of the judicial establishment in Scotland:

"In giving exoneration to the police, prosecutors and forensic staff, I think they show their lack of independence. No officials to be blamed: simply a Maltese shopkeeper."

He called for the full report of the SCCRC to be published, for a full and independent public inquiry into the Lockerbie bombing case and for the proceedings of the Court of Criminal Appeal to be witnessed by international observers.

On 4 July 2007, Köchler wrote to Scottish first minister, Alex Salmond, British foreign secretary, David Miliband, home secretary, Jacqui Smith and minister for Africa, Asia and the UN, Mark Malloch Brown, reiterating his call for a public inquiry into the Lockerbie case and insisting that UN-appointed legal experts (from countries other than the UK, US and Libya) should be involved in such an inquiry.

In the June 2008 edition of the Scottish lawyers' magazine The Firm, Köchler referred to the 'totalitarian' nature of the second Lockerbie appeal process saying it "bears the hallmarks of an 'intelligence operation'."

== Wide-ranging debate ==
Köchler's reports as UN-appointed international observer of one of the most controversial criminal trials in British history have led to a global debate on the role of NGO observers in the context of international criminal justice.

Through his novel and pro-active interpretation of his assignment as UN-appointed "international observer", he has redefined the role of observers in the context of international criminal justice. His reports have been published as landmark documents of international law in collections such as that of the Peace Palace Library of the International Court of Justice.

His experience as observer of the Lockerbie trial led him to write the book Global Justice or Global Revenge? (2003) in which he describes the challenges faced by international criminal justice under the conditions of power politics and draws general conclusions in terms of the doctrine of international law.

In September 2008, following a meeting organised by the Lockerbie Justice Group at Greshornish House on the Isle of Skye, Köchler and Professor Robert Black called for a new public inquiry into the Lockerbie bombing. Köchler said:

"Irrespective of the outcome of the current appeal, there should be a reinvestigation of the incident by the Scottish authorities. It is extremely frustrating that with regard to such an incident just one person has been presented as the culprit and no further questions asked. Only a child would believe such a story."

During Köchler's visit to Scotland, he met former MP and Lockerbie activist Tam Dalyell, MSP Alex Neil and Iain McKie, father of Scottish policewoman Shirley McKie. On 18 September 2008, he delivered a keynote speech on the "Lockerbie Trial and the Rule of Law" organised by The Firm magazine which was held at the Glasgow Hilton Hotel. Focusing on the public interest immunity certificate deployed by the British government, Köchler said:

"Whether those in public office like it or not, the Lockerbie trial has become a test case for the criminal justice system of Scotland. At the same time, it has become an exemplary case on a global scale – its handling will demonstrate whether a domestic system of criminal justice can resist the dictates of international power politics or simply becomes dysfunctional as soon as "supreme state interests" interfere with the imperatives of justice. (...) The fairness of judicial proceedings is undoubtedly a supreme and permanent public interest. If the rule of law is to be upheld, the requirements of the administration of justice may have to take precedence over public interests of a secondary order – such as a state's momentary foreign policy considerations or commercial and trade interests. The internal stability and international legitimacy of a polity in the long term depend on whether it is able to ensure the supremacy of the law over considerations of power and convenience."

== Hans Koechler's two observer reports ==
- Report on the trial (3 February 2001)
- Report on the appeal (26 March 2002)

== IPO documents ==
- Note concerning the status of Hans Köchler as international observer at the Lockerbie trial (2002)
- Köchler’s statement on the agreement between the US, UK and Libya on the remaining issues relating to the fulfilment of all Security Council resolutions regarding Lockerbie (2003)
- Hans Köchler’s statement on the decision of the Scottish Criminal Cases Review Commission on the referral of Mr. Megrahi’s case (2007)
- "Lockerbie case: new accusations of manipulation of key forensic evidence" Statement by Hans Köchler (2007)
- Statement by Hans Köchler on the withholding of evidence by the British government (2008)
- Statement by Hans Köchler on the second Lockerbie appeal and the right to a fair trial (2008)
- "The Lockerbie case: prisoner transfer or prisoner release? How to reconcile the requirements of the rule of law and the imperatives of humanity" – Hans Köchler's statement to the BBC (2009)
- "Release of the Lockerbie prisoner: the case is not closed" – Statement by Dr. Hans Köchler (2009)

== United Nations documents ==
- Press Conference by Secretary-General Kofi Annan on 5 April 1999 (see Para. 2)
- UN Press Release of 30 October 1997 welcoming UK invitation to send UN observers to Lockerbie trial
- Security Council resolution 1192 of 27 August 1998 providing for the nomination of international observers

== Köchler's publications on Lockerbie ==
- (Ed. with Jason Subler) The Lockerbie Trial: Documents related to the I.P.O. observer mission
- Global Justice or Global Revenge? International Criminal Justice at the Crossroads
- The Lockerbie Trial and the Rule of Law National Law School of India Review, Vol. 21(1), 2009

== See also ==
- Pan Am Flight 103
- Pan Am Flight 103 bombing trial
- Pan Am Flight 103 bombing investigation
- Pan Am Flight 103 conspiracy theories
- Abdelbaset al-Megrahi
- UTA Flight 772
- Global Justice or Global Revenge? by Hans Köchler
