= International Progress Organization =

Austria-based think tank

IPO logo

The International Progress Organization (IPO) is a Vienna-based think tank dealing with world affairs. As an international non-governmental organization (NGO) it enjoys consultative status with the Economic and Social Council of the United Nations and is associated with the United Nations Department of Public Information. The organization aims at promoting peaceful co-existence among all nations, in particular the dialogue among civilizations; a just international economic order; global respect for human rights; and the international rule of law. The IPO has members in more than 70 countries on all continents and organizes conferences and expert meetings on issues of conflict resolution, civilizational dialogue, international law, and United Nations reform. The organization publishes the series Studies in International Relations (since 1978) and monographs in the field of international relations theory.

The president of the IPO is Dr. Hans Köchler, the Chairman of the Department of Philosophy at the University of Innsbruck, Austria. The organization was founded in Innsbruck (Austria) in 1972 by a group of students from Austria, Egypt and India who felt a need for a new approach towards North-South relations and development partnership. Among the original supporters of the organization were the then Austrian President Rudolf Kirchschläger, Senegalese President Léopold Sédar Senghor, and Indian President Gyani Zail Singh.

== Activities ==
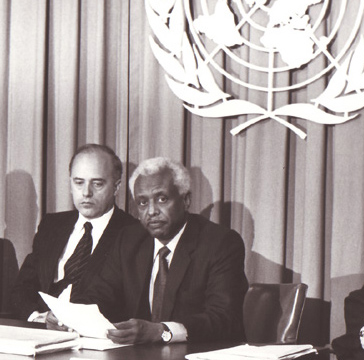
I.P.O. President Hans Koechler, left, with Field Marshal Abdul Rahman Sowar El-Dahab, former Head of State of Sudan, right, at UN headquarters in New York, 17 June 1988

Since 1974 the IPO has organized a series of lectures and conferences on the cultural dimension of international affairs (Amman 1974; Innsbruck 1974; Vienna 1979; Rome 1981; Nicosia 1984); these activities preceded the current global discourse on the dialogue of civilizations in which the I.P.O. has participated through the organization of expert meetings in Europe and the Muslim world. In 1987 the IPO initiated (in co-operation with Nobel Laureate Seán MacBride) the Lawyers' Appeal Against Nuclear War which led to a worldwide civil society campaign for a resolution by the UN General Assembly calling for an Advisory Opinion from the International Court of Justice (ICJ) on the question of the legality of nuclear arms. In September 1991 the IPO convened the Second International Conference On A More Democratic United Nations (CAMDUN-2) at the United Nations Office at Vienna. In 2000 the Secretary-General of the United Nations nominated two officials of the organization as international observers at the Lockerbie trial in the Netherlands (see also: Pan Am Flight 103 and Hans Köchler's Lockerbie trial observer mission). Since 1985, the IPO has been calling for a democratization of the United Nations Organization, in particular of the UN Security Council. Since 1987, the organization has been dealing with the problem of international terrorism, repeatedly suggesting a legal definition of terrorism by the UN General Assembly. The various initiatives and proposals are documented in the IPO conference proceedings. In addition to the organization of lectures and international conferences, the IPO has undertaken (since 1980) monitoring missions in the fields of human rights and the rule of law.

== Selected conferences and expert meetings ==
- The Cultural Self-comprehension of Nations: In co-operation with the United Nations Educational, Scientific and Cultural Organization (UNESCO), Innsbruck, Austria, 27–29 July 1974
- The New International Economic Order – Philosophical and Socio-cultural Implications: Vienna, Austria, 2–3 April 1979
- The Legal Aspects of the Palestine Problem with Special Regard to the Question of Jerusalem: Vienna, Austria, 5–7 November 1980
- The Concept of Monotheism in Islam and Christianity: Rome, Italy, 17–19 November 1981
- The Principles of Non-alignment – The Non-aligned Countries in the Eighties: Results and Perspectives: Baghdad, Iraq, 4–6 May 1982
- The United States' Foreign Policy - Facts and Judgement: Brussels, Belgium, 28–30 September 1984
- The New International Information and Communication Order – Basis for Cultural Dialogue and Peaceful Co-existence among Nations: In co-operation with the United Nations Educational, Scientific and Cultural Organization (UNESCO), Nicosia, Cyprus, 26–27 October 1984
- Democracy in International Relations: On the occasion of the 40th anniversary of the founding of the United Nations Organization, New York City, USA, 31 October 1985
- The Crisis of Representative Democracy: Geneva, Switzerland, 15–17 November 1985
- The Question of Terrorism: Geneva, Switzerland, 19–21 March 1987
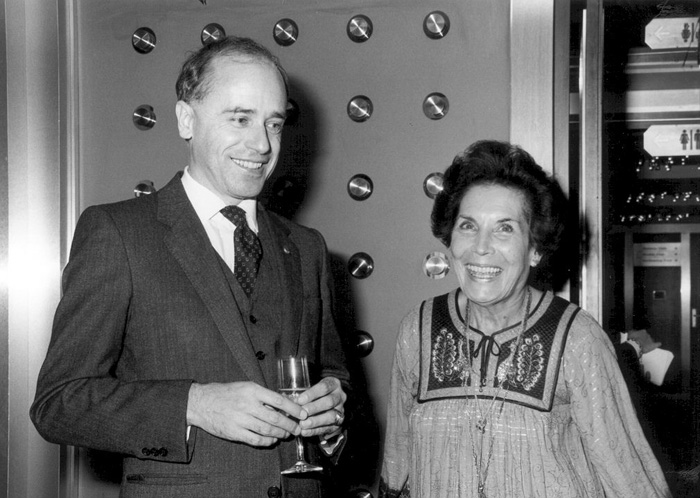
  I.P.O. President Hans Koechler with Hortensia Bussi de Allende (Chile), attending the organization's international conference in Brussels, September 1984
- The Exchange of Prisoners of War between Iran and Iraq as a Requirement of International Law and Human Rights: Geneva, Switzerland, 29–30 May 1989
- Second International Conference On A More Democratic United Nations (CAMDUN-2): Convened at the United Nations Office at Vienna, 17–19 September 1991
- The Sanctions Policy of the United Nations Security Council: Geneva, Switzerland, 23 May 1992
- Islam and the West - The Conflict in Bosnia-Herzegovina and its Implications for a New World Order: Vienna, Austria, 25 November 1993
- Democracy after the End of the East-West Conflict: In co-operation with the University of Innsbruck and University Center Luxemburg; Innsbruck, Austria, 27 May 1994
- The United Nations and International Democracy: Geneva, Switzerland, 1–2 July 1994
- Economic Sanctions and Their Impact on Development: In co-operation with the NGO Committee on Development; United Nations Office at Vienna; Vienna, Austria, 28 November 1996
- Civilizations: Conflict or Dialogue?: In co-operation with the Departments of Philosophy and American Studies at the University of Innsbruck; Innsbruck, Austria, 8 June 1998
- The Challenges of Globalization: In co-operation with the Department of Philosophy at LMU Munich; Munich, Germany, 18–19 March 1999
- The United Nations and International Power Politics: The Future of World Order: In co-operation with International Human Rights Association of American Minorities and East-West University, Chicago, Ill., USA, 5 June 2004
- The Use of Force in International Relations – Challenges to Collective Security: In co-operation with the Department of Philosophy at the University of Innsbruck; Innsbruck, Austria, 22 June 2005
- The 'Global War on Terror' and its Implications for Muslim-Western Relations: In co-operation with the Center for Policy Research and International Studies of Malaysia Science University; Penang, Malaysia, 13–14 December 2007
- Religion, State and Society in Turkey: Seminar series in Istanbul, Mardin and Ankara, Turkey (6-13 May 2011)
