= World Day for International Justice =

International day on July 17

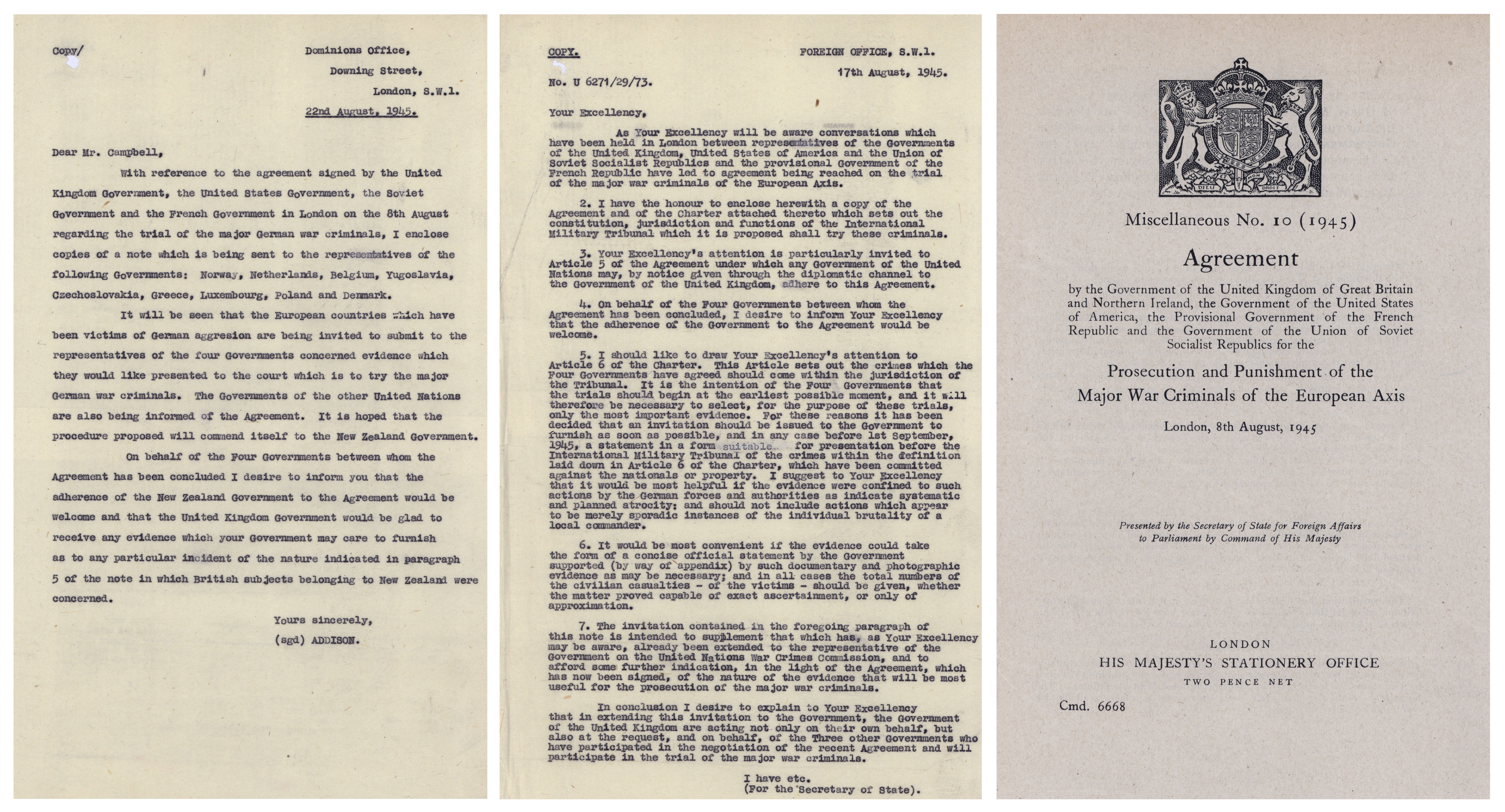
Tribunal for the Trial of War Criminals (1944-1968)

World Day for International Justice, also referred to as Day of International Criminal Justice or International Justice Day, is an international day celebrated throughout the world on July 17 as part of an effort to recognize the emerging system of international criminal justice. July 17 is the date of the adoption of the treaty that created the International Criminal Court. On 1 June 2010, at the Review Conference of the Rome Statute held in Kampala (Uganda), the Assembly of State Parties decided to celebrate 17 July as the Day of International Criminal Justice.

Each year, people around the world use this day to host events to promote international criminal justice, especially support for the International Criminal Court.
