= Global Justice or Global Revenge? =

Book by Austrian philosopher Hans Köchler

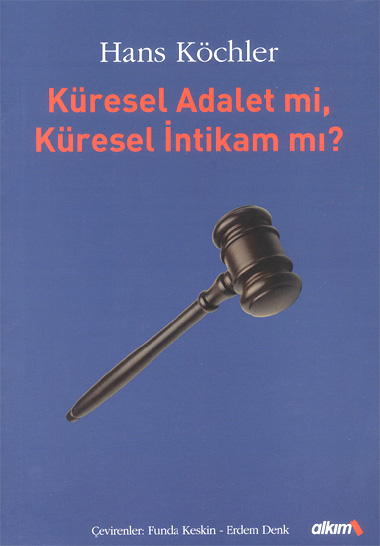
- 2005 Turkish edition
- Author: Hans Köchler
- Subject: International Criminal Justice
- Genre: Non-fiction
- Publication date: 2003

Global Justice or Global Revenge: International Criminal Justice at the Crossroads (2003) is a book by Austrian philosopher Hans Köchler.

== Topics ==
The book deals with the evolving concept of universal jurisdiction, the doctrine of humanitarian intervention, legal questions of international terrorism, and whether international criminal justice can at all be practiced in the absence of a global balance of power. The book analyzes the various international criminal courts since Nuremberg and provides a critical assessment of the prospects of the International Criminal Court. It challenges the assumption of established legal theory in which the normative framework of criminal justice can be abstracted from actual power relations and offers elements of a new doctrine on the "dialectical relationship" between power and law.

== Contents ==
I. The Developing Idea and Practice of International Criminal Justice in the Context of State Sovereignty and Individual Responsibility

- 1. Preliminary remarks
- 2. The rationale of universal jurisdiction
- 3. The dilemma of international criminal justice in the framework of state-centered international law: The question of enforcement
- 4. Efforts towards international criminal justice since the 19th century
- 5. The primary avenues of international criminal justice: A critical appraisal
- 6. Problems of the application of universal jurisdiction by the ICC under the conditions of a unipolar world order

II. Humanitarian Intervention in the Context of Modern Power Politics

- 1. The concept of humanitarian intervention and its historical background
- 2. The development of international law and the prohibition of the use of force in the 20th century
- 3. The revival of interventionism in the new imperial order of the 21st century
- 4. The doctrine of humanitarian intervention and the de facto reintroduction of the jus ad bellum
- 5. The renaissance of power politics in humanitarian clothes – The end of international law?

III. The United Nations, the International Rule of Law and Terrorism

- 1. The United Nations Organization in the global power constellation
- 2. Obstacles to the enforcement of the international rule of law in a unipolar power structure
- 3. The dilemma faced by the United Nations in the fight against terrorism
- 4. The history of United Nations codification efforts and measures against terrorism
- 5. The way out of the dilemma: Comprehensive definition of terrorism by means of integration into existing instruments of international humanitarian law and international criminal law
- 6. The conditions for a consistent anti-terrorist policy of the United Nations

IV. Annex

- 1. Memorandum on the indictments by the International Criminal Tribunal for the former Yugoslavia (1999)
- 2. International criminal justice and power politics: The Lockerbie case (UN observer reports)
- 3. The Baku Declaration on Global Dialogue and Peaceful Co-Existence Among Nations and the Threats Posed by International Terrorism (2001)

== See also ==
- Hans Köchler
- Hans Köchler's Lockerbie trial observer mission
