= Legal Tools =

Legal information service developed by ICC

The Legal Tools Database is part of the global commons.

The term 'Legal Tools' refers to online legal-information services developed by the ICC Legal Tools Project since 2006, primarily with support from the European Union. The main services are the Legal Tools Database ('LTD'), the Legal Tools Website, and the Case Matrix. The anthology Active Complementarity: Legal Information Transfer provides comprehensive information about the ICC Legal Tools Project and its open access value-base.

The Legal Tools Database is an online database on international criminal law. It provides legal practitioners, researchers, students and the general public with open access to all relevant legal sources in international criminal law, including information on the core international crimes (genocide, crimes against humanity, war crimes and the crime of aggression). Being a tool of computer-assisted legal research, the LTD provides access to all relevant case law, legislation (statutes and treaties), preparatory works as well as academic writings. All resources are stored under persistent URLs (so-called PURLs). As a consequence, courts, publishers (for example, the Torkel Opsahl Academic EPublisher) and other online services (such as Lexsitus and the CMN Knowledge Hub) hyperlink to the LTD-PURLs. The International Criminal Court links in its main public decisions to the LTD. For example, the judgement of the trial chamber in the case of Germain Katanga included 538 hyperlinks. The LTD saw more than 6 million hits in 2018. As of 1 May 2019, it contained some 145,000 documents.

The Case Matrix is another service of the ICC Legal Tools Project. It is a software that provides a matrix of the legal requirements of international crimes and modes of liability, on the one hand, and potential evidence or evidence, on the other. It has two digests of international case law quotations implemented at the level of elements of crime. The digests are also available in Lexsitus. There are online versions in English, Arabic and Bosnian/Croatian/Serbian. The Centre for International Law and Research (CILRAP) has hosted and serviced the Case Matrix since 2012. The creators of the Case Matrix, Morten Bergsmo and Ralph Hecksteden, won the 2008 Dieter Meurer Prize for Legal Informatics for its innovative qualities. The Case Matrix has motivated and informed the development of software such as I-DOC. The Case Matrix application has also inspired the name of the 'Case Matrix Network' which is the department of the Centre for International Law Research and Policy that is responsible for knowledge transfer and capacity development activities.

The ICC Legal Tools Project ('LTP') has led the development of the Legal Tools since their start in 2003. Morten Bergsmo founded the Project when he served as the Senior Legal Adviser of the Office of the Prosecutor of the International Criminal Court (2002-2005), and he has been the LTP Co-ordinator since. Devasheesh Bais is the Deputy Co-ordinator. Ralph Hecksteden has been the technical developer of the Project since 2005. The Project is supported by more than a dozen academic institutions and non-governmental organizations from all continents, as well as by more than 40 CMN Fellows offered pro bono to the Project by the Centre for International Law Research and Policy (CILRAP). The European Union and Finland have been the main donors to the ICC Legal Tools Project. The institutional partners in the project have received support from other donors, such as Norway.

== Contents of the Legal Tools Database ==
As of 1 October 2026, the Legal Tools Database contained more than 440,000 documents. The documents can be accessed in a tree-structure, where they are organized in nine main collections. Each collection has multiple sub-collections, and responsibility to update the collections is assigned to partners or CMN Fellows according to a detailed table of responsibilities. These are the nine main collections of documents in the Legal Tools Database:

- International Criminal Court Documents
- Other International(ised) Criminal Jurisdictions
- International Legal Instruments
- Human Rights Law Decisions and Documents
- Other International Law Decisions and Documents
- National Criminal Jurisdictions
- Publications
- United Nations War Crimes Commission
- International(ised) Fact-Finding Mandates
