= International criminal law =

Body of public international law

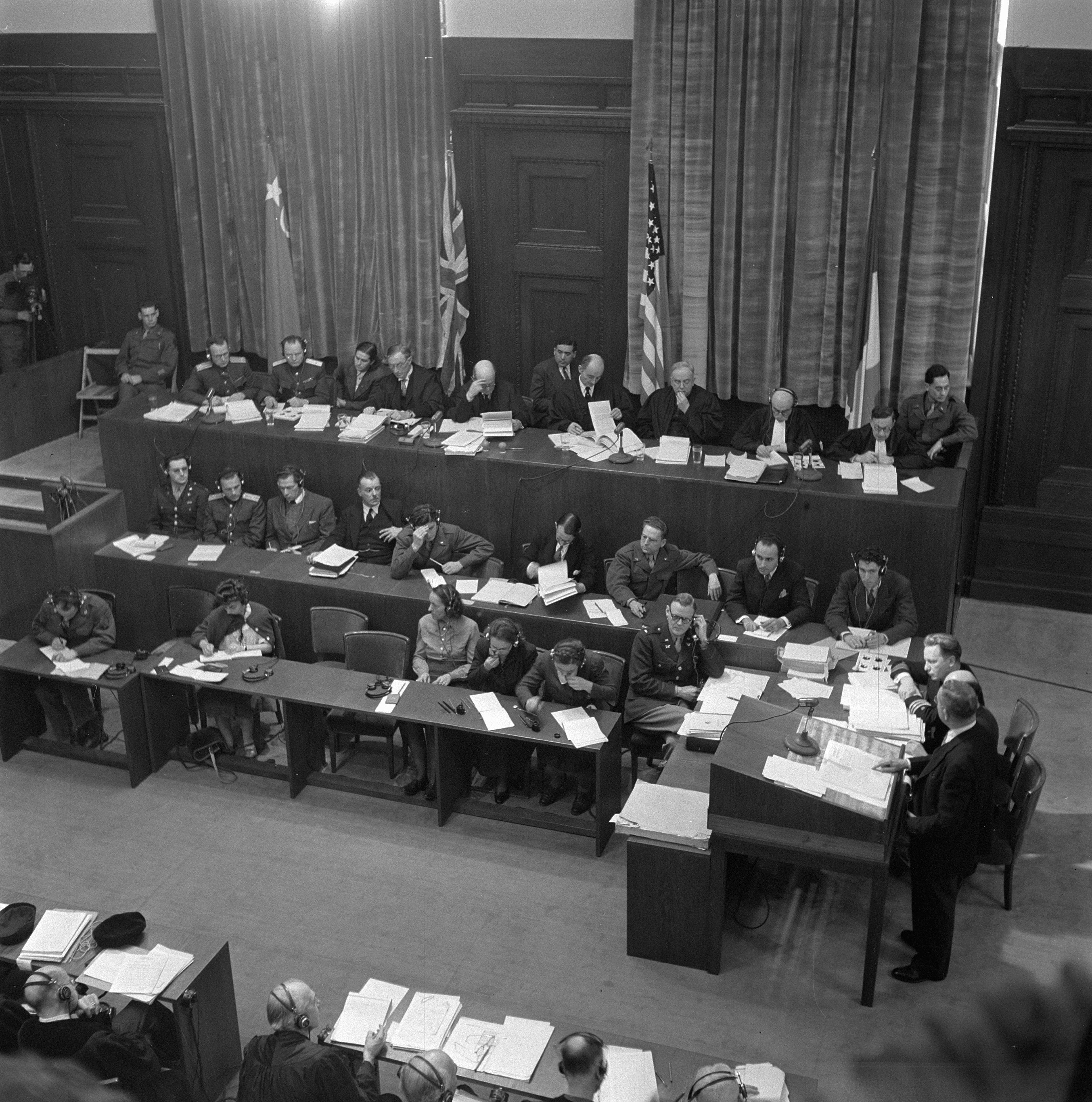
The International Military Tribunal in Nuremberg was the first court to apply international criminal law.

International criminal law (ICL) is a body of public international law designed to prohibit certain categories of conduct commonly viewed as serious atrocities and to make perpetrators of such conduct criminally accountable for their perpetration. The core crimes under international law are genocide, war crimes, crimes against humanity, and the crime of aggression.

Classical international law governs the relationships, rights, and responsibilities of states. After World War II, the Charter of the International Military Tribunal and the following Nuremberg trial revolutionized international law by applying its prohibitions directly to individuals, in this case the defeated leaders of Nazi Germany, thus inventing international criminal law. After being dormant for decades, international criminal law was revived in the 1990s to address the war crimes in the Yugoslav Wars and the Rwandan genocide, leading to the establishment of a permanent International Criminal Court in 2001.

== Background ==
International criminal law is best understood as an attempt by the international community to address the most grievous atrocities. It has not been an ideal instrument to make the fine and nuanced distinctions typical of national law, for these shift focus from those large scale atrocities that "shock the conscience", with which it is concerned. This creates significant differences of analysis between the legal systems, notably for the concept of legal intent.

== History ==
The first attempt to establish an international criminal tribunal occurred as part of the Treaty of Versailles, which stated that Wilhelm II of the German Empire was to be tried before a bench of five allied judges. However, this plan was abandoned after Wilhelm fled to the Netherlands, a non-signatory to the Treaty which subsequently refused to extradite him. After World War II, the Allied powers set up an international tribunal to try not only war crimes, but crimes against humanity committed by Nazi Germany and Imperial Japan. The Nuremberg Tribunal held its first session in 1945 and pronounced judgments on September 30 and October 1, 1946. A similar tribunal was established for Japanese war crimes (the International Military Tribunal for the Far East), operating from 1946 to 1948.

After the beginning of the war in Bosnia, the United Nations Security Council established the International Criminal Tribunal for the Former Yugoslavia (ICTY) in 1993, followed by the International Criminal Tribunal for Rwanda (ICTR) after the Rwandan genocide in 1994. The International Law Commission also commenced preparatory work for the establishment of a permanent International Criminal Court in 1993, which began operations after the Rome Statute entered into force in 2002 (issuing its first arrest warrants in 2005).

Throughout its history, many international criminal tribunals have flouted the legal principle of nullum crimen sine lege and convicted defendants of acts that were not a crime when committed. As a result, they have faced criticism for privileging substantive justice above the principle of legality.

== Sources of international criminal law ==
International criminal law is a subset of international law. As such, its sources are those that comprise international law. The classical enumeration of those sources is in Article 38(1) of the 1946 Statute of the International Court of Justice and comprise: treaties, customary international law, general principles of law (and as a subsidiary measure judicial decisions and the most highly qualified juristic writings). The Rome Statute governing the International Criminal Court contains an analogous, though not identical, set of sources that the court may rely on.

The rules or principles applied to a case will depend on the type of body presiding over the matter. National courts may not necessarily apply rules and principles from international law as an international tribunal might. The law as applied by specific tribunals may vary depending on the Statute of the Tribunal. They may also apply national laws if given the authority to do so as the Special Court for Sierra Leone was.

== Core crimes under international law ==
The core crimes under international law are war crimes, genocide, crimes against humanity, and the crime of aggression.

A war crime is a violation of the law of war treaties or provisions that gives rise to individual criminal responsibility for actions committed in connection to armed conflict. These actions include intentionally killing, torturing, raping, or taking protected persons hostages; unnecessarily destroying protected civilian property; deception by perfidy; and pillaging. They also include, for any individual that is part of the command structure, who orders any attempt to commit mass killings including genocide or ethnic cleansing of protected persons; the granting of no quarter despite surrender; the conscription of children in the military; and flouting the legal distinctions of proportionality and military necessity.

Genocide is the intentional destruction of a people (Note: Usually defined as an ethnic, national, racial, or religious group.) in whole or in part. The United Nations 1948 Genocide Convention defines genocide as any of five "acts committed with intent to destroy, in whole or in part, a national, ethnical, racial or religious group." These five acts are: killing members of the group, causing them serious bodily or mental harm, imposing living conditions intended to destroy the group, preventing births, and forcibly transferring children out of the group. Victims are targeted because of their real or perceived membership of a group, not randomly. Genocide, especially large-scale genocide, is widely considered to signify the epitome of human evil, and can be committed against protected or non-protected persons alike in the context of interstate conflicts.

Crimes against humanity are widespread or systemic criminal acts which are committed by or on behalf of a state or de facto authority that grossly violate human rights. Unlike war crimes, crimes against humanity do not have to take place within the context of wars, and they apply to widespread practices rather than acts which are committed by individuals. Like genocide, crimes against humanity can be committed against people who do not fulfill the criteria of protected persons in the context of interstate conflicts and are part of an official policy or tolerated by authorities. A global standard of human rights was articulated in the Universal Declaration of Human Rights (1948). Crimes against humanity have been prosecuted by international courts (such as the International Criminal Court) as well as by domestic courts.

A crime of aggression is the planning, initiation, or execution of a large-scale and serious act of aggression using state military force. The Rome Statute contains an exhaustive list of acts of aggression that can give rise to individual criminal responsibility, which include invasion, military occupation, annexation by the use of force, bombardment, and military blockade of ports. Aggression is generally a leadership crime that can be committed only by those with the power to shape a state's policy of aggression, rather than those who carry it out. The philosophical basis for the wrongness of aggression is found in just war theory, in which waging a war without a just cause for self-defense is unjust. The International Military Tribunal ruled in 1946 that aggression was "the supreme international crime" because "it contains within itself the accumulated evil of the whole".

== Prosecutions ==
The prosecution of severe international crimes—including genocide, crimes against humanity, and war crimes—is necessary to enforce international criminal law and deliver justice to victims. This is an important component of transitional justice, or the process of transforming societies into rights-respecting democracies and addressing past human rights violations. Investigations and trials of leaders who have committed crimes and caused mass political or military atrocities is a key demand of victims of human rights abuses. Prosecution of such criminals can play a key role in restoring dignity to victims, and restoring trusting relationships in society.

James Waller concludes that

genocide is worth it because not only does it often work, but the chances of punishment for those who orchestrate and carry it out are, if existent, relatively inconsequential. Impunity is the rule rather than the exemption. A recent documentary, for instance, states that more than 800,000 SS soldiers survived the war. While several thousand were prosecuted for war crimes, only 124 were convicted. The apprehension and conviction rates for international tribunals are as equally disconcerting, even as they are empowering for would-be perpetrators.

=== Limitations ===
Article 9 of the Nuremberg Charter states:

At the trial of any individual member of any group of organization the Tribunal may declare (in connection with any act of which the individual may be convicted) that the group or organization of which the individual was a member was a criminal organization.

Article 9, which was used to prosecute membership in the Schutzstaffel (SS), allows the criminalization of certain organizations (presumably state-supported) and prosecution for membership by allowing individuals to be prosecuted where evidence was otherwise insufficient. It also has some implications concerning asset seizures, reparations and other payments for damages caused by violations of international law, but does not impose criminal responsibility on organizations in their capacity as organizations. Under Article 9, the SS and several Nazi other organizations were criminalized, including the Leadership Corps of the Nazi Party.

Human rights standards have been applied to these groups in some cases, as the Inter-American Commission on Human Rights in Colombia until 1999. The application of human rights treaties to these groups remains the exception, rather than the rule. Human rights are usually understood conceptually as those rights individuals hold against the state, and some scholars argue that they are poorly suited to the task of resolving disputes that arise in the course of armed conflict between the state and armed opposition groups.

== Institutions of international criminal law ==
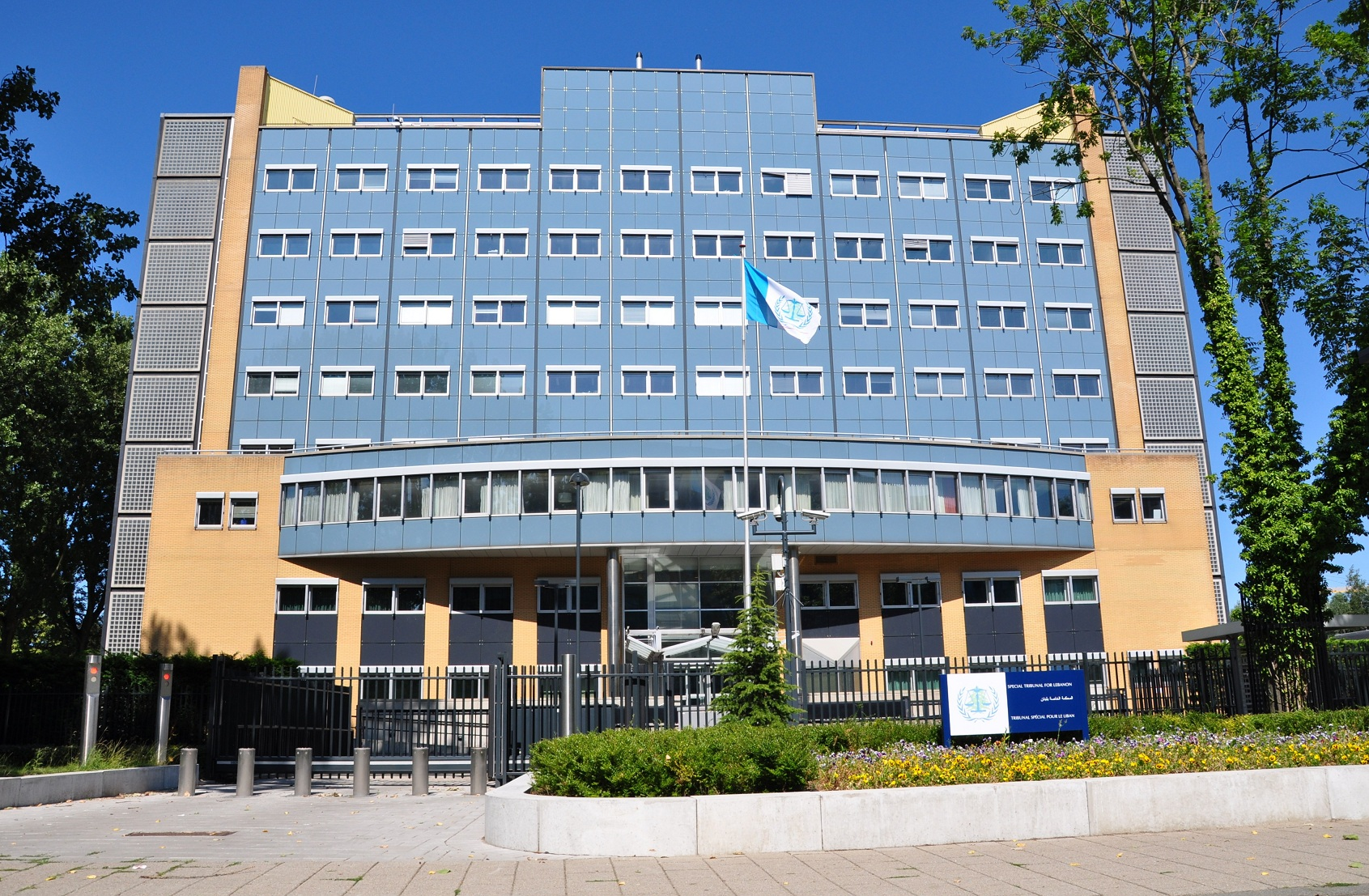
The Lebanon Tribunal in Leidschendam, Netherlands

Today, the most important institution is the International Criminal Court (ICC), as well as several ad hoc tribunals:

- International Criminal Tribunal for the former Yugoslavia
- International Criminal Tribunal for Rwanda

Apart from these institutions, some "hybrid" courts and tribunals exist—judicial bodies with both international and national judges:

- Special Court for Sierra Leone (investigating the crimes committed the Sierra Leone Civil War)
- Extraordinary Chambers in the Courts of Cambodia (investigating the crimes of the Red Khmer era)
- Special Tribunal for Lebanon (investigating the assassination of Rafik Hariri)
- Special Panels of the Dili District Court
- War Crimes Chamber of the Court of Bosnia and Herzegovina
- Kosovo Specialist Chambers and Specialist Prosecutor’s Office
- Special Tribunal for the Crime of Aggression against Ukraine

Some domestic courts have also been established to hear international crimes, such as the International Crimes Tribunal (Bangladesh).

=== International Criminal Court ===
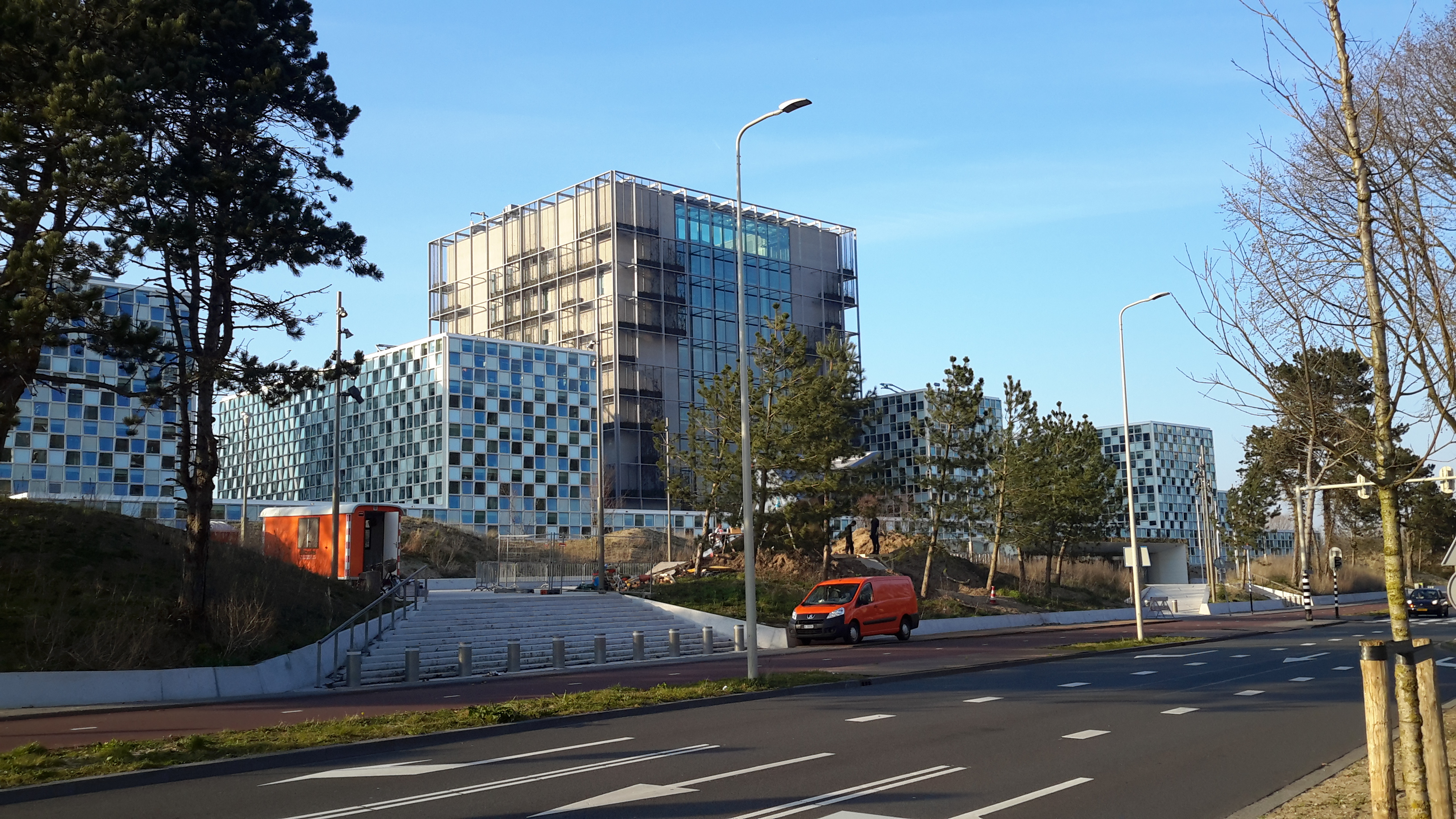
The International Criminal Court in The Hague

The International Criminal Court (French: Cour Pénale Internationale; commonly referred to as the ICC or ICCt) is a permanent tribunal to prosecute individuals for genocide, crimes against humanity, war crimes, and the crime of aggression (although it cannot currently exercise jurisdiction over the crime of aggression).

The court's creation perhaps constitutes the most significant reform of international law since 1945. It gives authority to the two bodies of international law that deal with treatment of individuals: human rights and humanitarian law.

It came into being on July 1, 2002—the date its founding treaty, the Rome Statute of the International Criminal Court, entered into force—and it can only prosecute crimes committed on or after that date. The court's official seat is in The Hague, Netherlands, but its proceedings may take place anywhere.

As of January 2025, 125 states (Note: The sum of (a) states parties, (b) signatories and (c) non-signatory United Nations member states is 195. This number is two more than the number of United Nations member states (193) due to Palestine and Cook Islands being states parties but not United Nations member states.) are parties to the Statute of the Court, including all the countries of South America, nearly all of Europe, most of Oceania and roughly half of Africa. Burundi and the Philippines were member states, but later withdrew effective 27 October 2017 and 17 March 2019, respectively. A further 29 countries have signed but not ratified the Rome Statute. The law of treaties obliges these states to refrain from "acts which would defeat the object and purpose" of the treaty until they declare they do not intend to become a party to the treaty. Four signatory states have informed the UN Secretary General that they no longer intend to become states parties and, as such, have no legal obligations arising from their signature of the Statute; they are Israel in 2002, the United States on 6 May 2002, Sudan on 26 August 2008, and Russia on 30 November 2016. Forty-one other states have neither signed nor acceded to the Rome Statute. Some of them, including China and India, are critical of the Court.

The court can generally exercise jurisdiction only in cases where the accused is a national of a state party, the alleged crime took place on the territory of a state party, or a situation is referred to the court by the United Nations Security Council. It is designed to complement existing national judicial systems: it can exercise its jurisdiction only when national courts are unwilling or unable to investigate or prosecute such crimes. Primary responsibility to investigate and punish crimes is therefore left to individual states.

To date, the Court: opened investigations in Afghanistan (twice), Bangladesh/Myanmar, Burundi, the Central African Republic (twice), Côte d'Ivoire, Darfur in Sudan, the Democratic Republic of the Congo, Georgia, Kenya, Libya, Lithuania/Belarus, Mali, Palestine, the Philippines, Uganda, Ukraine, and Venezuela I. The Office of the Prosecutor carried out and closed preliminary investigations in Bolivia; Colombia; Congo II; Gabon; Guinea; Honduras; Iraq/the United Kingdom; registered vessels of Comoros, Greece, and Cambodia; South Korea; and Venezuela II. An ongoing preliminary examination is being carried out in the situation in Nigeria.

It publicly indicted 76 people. Proceedings against 39 are ongoing: 33 are at large as fugitives, two cases are in the pre-trial stage, one person is on trial, and three cases are in the appeals stage. Proceedings against 37 have been completed: three are serving sentences, seven have finished sentences, four have been acquitted, eight have had the charges against them dismissed, five have had the charges against them withdrawn, and 10 have died before the conclusion of the proceedings against them.

As of March 2011, three trials against four people are underway: two trials regarding the situation in the Democratic Republic of the Congo and one trial regarding the Central African Republic. Another two people have been committed to a fourth trial in the situation of Darfur, Sudan. One confirmation of charges hearing (against one person in the situation of the DR Congo) is to start in July 2011 while two new cases (against a total of six persons in the situation of Kenya) will begin with the suspects' first appearances in April 2011.

The judicial division of the court consists of 18 judges who are elected by the Assembly of State Parties for their qualifications, impartiality, and integrity, and serve nine-year, non-renewable terms. The judges are responsible to ensure fair trials, render decisions, issue arrest warrants or summonses to appear, authorize victims to participate, and order witness protection measures. They elect among themselves the ICC president and two vice presidents who head the court. The Court has three Judicial Divisions who hear matters at different stages of the proceedings: Pre-Trial, Trial, and Appeals.

Pre-Trial: three judges decide if there is enough evidence for a case to go to trial, and if so, confirm the charges and commit the case to trial. They are responsible to issue arrest warrants or summonses to appeal, preserve evidence, protect suspects and witnesses, appoint counsel or other support for the defense, ensure that a person is not detained for an unreasonable period prior to trial, and safeguard information affecting national security Trial: three judges decide if there is enough evidence to prove beyond a reasonable doubt that the accused is guilty as charged, sentence those found guilty, and pronounce the sentence in public, order reparation to victims, including restitution, compensation and rehabilitation.

Appeal: five judges handle appeals filed by parties that confirm, reverse or amend a decision on guilt or innocence or on the sentence and potentially order a new trial before a different Trial Chamber. They also ensure that the conviction was not materially affected by errors or by unfairness of proceedings and that the sentence is proportionate to the crimes. The appeal judges are also empowered to confirm, reverse or amend an order for reparations revise the final judgment of conviction or the sentence, and hear appeals on a decision on jurisdiction or admissibility, interim release decisions and interlocutory matters.

The Court's Pre-Trial Chambers has publicly indicted 41 people, and issued arrest warrants for 33 others, and summonses to eight more. Seven people are currently in ICC detention. At the trial stage, there are 23 ongoing proceedings, as 12 people are at large as fugitives, three are under arrest but not in the Court’s custody, and one is appealing his conviction. Seventeen proceedings have been completed, resulting in three convictions, one acquittal, six had the charges against them dismissed, two had the charges against them withdrawn, one had his case declared inadmissible, and four died before trial.

An example to illustrate the Court’s proceedings is Thomas Lubanga, 51, a Congolese warlord and the first person convicted by the Court for his crimes of recruiting and using child soldiers. In March 2012, Lubanga was found guilty and sentenced to 14 years in prison for abducting boys and girls under the age of 15 and forcing them to fight in for his army, the Force Patriotique pour la Libération du Congo (FPLC), in the Democratic Republic of Congo’s Ituri region between 2002 and 2003. FPLC recruited children as young as 11 from their homes and schools to participate in an ethnic fighting, and many were taken to military camps, where they were beaten, drugged, and girls used as sex slaves. On 13 January 2006 the ICC Prosecution filed an application for the issuance of a warrant of arrest for Lubanga, which was granted by the Pre-Trial Chamber I on 10 February 2006. On 17 March 2006 Congolese authorities surrendered Lubanga to the Court, where he was held in their detention center in the Hague until 20 March 2006, where he made his first court appearance to confirm his identity, ensure he was informed of the crimes of which he was accused, and receive a counsel of defense. From 26 August 2011 to 14 March 2012, the Trial Chamber I, composed of judges from France, the Dominican Republic, and Hungary, heard Lubanga’s case, which included 36 witnesses, including 3 experts called by the Office of the Prosecutor, 24 witnesses called by the defense and three witnesses called by the legal representatives of the victims participating in the proceedings. The Chamber also called four experts and a total of 129 victims, represented by two teams of legal representatives and the Office of Public Counsel for Victims. Trial Chamber I unanimously found Lubanga guilty as a co-perpetrator of the war crimes of conscripting and enlisting children under the age of 15 and using them to participate actively in hostilities from 1 September 2002 to 13 August 2003.

=== International Criminal Tribunal for Rwanda ===
The International Criminal Tribunal for Rwanda (ICTR), or the Tribunal pénal international pour le Rwanda (TPIR), is an international court established in November 1994 by the United Nations Security Council in Resolution 955 in order to judge people responsible for the Rwandan genocide and other serious violations of the international law in Rwanda, or by Rwandan citizens in nearby states, between 1 January and 31 December 1994.

In 1995 it became located in Arusha, Tanzania, under Resolution 977. (From 2006, Arusha also became the location of the African Court on Human and Peoples' Rights). In 1998 the operation of the Tribunal was expanded in Resolution 1165. Through several resolutions, the Security Council called on the Tribunal to complete its investigations by end of 2004, complete all trial activities by end of 2008, and complete all work in 2012.

The tribunal has jurisdiction over genocide, crimes against humanity and war crimes, which are defined as violations of Common Article Three and Additional Protocol II of the Geneva Conventions (dealing with war crimes committed during internal conflicts).

As of 2009, the Tribunal had finished 50 trials and convicted 29 accused persons. Another 11 trials were in progress. 14 individuals were awaiting trial in detention; the prosecutor intended to transfer 5 to national jurisdiction for trial. 13 others were still at large, some suspected to be dead. The first trial, of Jean-Paul Akayesu, began in 1997. Jean Kambanda, interim Prime Minister, pleaded guilty. According to the ICTR's Completion Strategy, in accordance with Security Council Resolution 1503, all first-instance cases were to have completed trial by the end of 2008 (this date was later extended to the end of 2009).

On 1 July 2012, the International Residual Mechanism for Criminal Tribunals was expected to continue the work begun by the ICTR. The ICTR was requested by the United Nations Security Council to finish its work by 31 December 2014, and to prepare its closure and transition of cases to the Mechanism.

=== International Criminal Tribunal for the former Yugoslavia ===
The International Tribunal for the Prosecution of Persons Responsible for Serious Violations of International Humanitarian Law Committed in the Territory of the Former Yugoslavia since 1991, more commonly referred to as the International Criminal Tribunal for the former Yugoslavia or ICTY, was a body of the United Nations established to prosecute serious crimes committed during the Yugoslav Wars, and to try their perpetrators. An ad hoc court, the tribunal was situated in The Hague, the Netherlands.

The ICTY was established by United Nations Security Council Resolution 827, which was passed on 25 May 1993. It had jurisdiction over four clusters of crime that had been committed on the territory of the former Yugoslavia since 1991: grave breaches of the Geneva Conventions, violations of the laws or customs of war, genocide, and crime against humanity. The maximum sentence it could impose was life imprisonment. Various countries reached agreements with the UN to carry out custodial sentences. The last indictment issued by the ICTY was on 15 March 2004.

A total of 161 persons were indicted by the ICTY during the course of its existence. The final fugitive, Goran Hadžić, was arrested on 20 July 2011. The ICTY's final judgment was issued on 29 November 2017 and the institution formally ceased to exist on 31 December 2017. Residual functions of the ICTY, including oversight of sentences and consideration of any appeal proceedings initiated since 1 July 2013, are under the jurisdiction of a successor body, the International Residual Mechanism for Criminal Tribunals (IRMCT).

=== Special Tribunal for the Crime of Aggression against Ukraine ===
In September 2022, the Council of Europe, the European Commission, the NATO Parliamentary Assembly and several governments, including the Government of Ukraine, called for the establishment of an international criminal tribunal to "investigate and prosecute the crime of aggression" committed by "the political and military leadership of the Russian Federation." The Council of Europe proposed the tribunal to be located in Strasbourg, to "apply the definition of the crime of aggression" established in customary international law and to "have the power to issue international arrest warrants and not be limited by State immunity or the immunity of heads of State and government and other State officials." In November 2022, the NATO Parliamentary Assembly designated the Russian Federation as a terrorist organization and called upon the international community to "take collective action towards the establishment of an international tribunal to prosecute the crime of aggression committed by Russia with its war against Ukraine." The European Commission repeated its call for creating the tribunal. On 25 June 2025, the Special Tribunal for the Crime of Aggression against Ukraine was formally created by a formal legal agreement between the Council of Europe and Ukraine.

== See also ==
- Command responsibility – Doctrine of hierarchical accountability
- Crimes against humanity – Concept in international law
- Criminal law#Criminal law jurisdictions
- Genocide studies – Academic field of study that researches genocide
- Genocides in history
- Incitement to genocide – Crime against humanity under international law
- International Criminal Court – International tribunal organisation
- INTERPOL – International police organization
- International humanitarian law – Law of war to protect non-combatants
- International law – Norms in international relations
- Legal Tools – Legal information service developed by ICC (A database on International Criminal Law)
- Rule of Law in Armed Conflicts Project (RULAC) – International law initiative
- World Day for International Justice – International day on July 17

== Bibliography ==
- John E. Ackerman and Eugene O'Sullivan, Practice and Procedure of the International Criminal Tribunal for the Former Yugoslavia with selected materials from the International Criminal Tribunal for Rwanda. The Hague etc.: Kluwer Law International, 2002, xxi + 555 pp. ISBN 90-411-1478-5
- (fr) Jean Albert (dir.), L'avenir de la justice pénale internationale, Institut Presage, Bruylant, 2018, 383 p. (ISBN 978-2-8027-5345-2).
- Daniele Archibugi and Alice Pease, Crime and Global Justice. The Dynamics of International Punishment. Cambridge: Polity Press, 2018, 288 pp. ISBN 978-1-50951-262-1.
- Ilias Bantekas, Susan Nash, Mark Mackarel, International Criminal Law. London etc.: Cavendish, 2001, lvi + 323 pp. ISBN 1-85941-557-1
- M. Cherif Bassiouni, Introduction to International Criminal Law. Ardsley, NY: Transnational Publishers, 2003, xxxvi + 823 pp. ISBN 1-57105-286-0
- Yves Beigbeder, Judging War Criminals. The Politics of International Justice. Basingstoke: Macmillan, 1999, xvii + 230 pp. ISBN 0-333-68153-3
- Gerlach, Christian (2010). Extremely Violent Societies: Mass Violence in the Twentieth-Century World. Cambridge University Press. p. 6. ISBN 978-1-139-49351-2 – via Google Books.
- Hollander, Paul (1 July 2012). "Perspectives on Norman Naimark's Stalin's Genocides". Journal of Cold War Studies. 14 (3): 149–189. doi:10.1162/JCWS_a_00250. S2CID 57560838.
- Charles Jalloh, Regionalizing International Criminal Law?, International Criminal Law Review 9(3), 445-499 (2009).
- Kriangsak Kittichaisaree, International Criminal Law. Oxford etc.: Oxford University Press, 2002, xxxi + 482 pp. ISBN 0-19-876577-0
- Hans Köchler, Global Justice or Global Revenge? International Criminal Justice at the Crossroads, Vienna / New York: Springer, 2003, ix + 449 pp. ISBN 3-211-00795-4
- Lang, Berel (2005). "The Evil in Genocide". Genocide and Human Rights: A Philosophical Guide. Palgrave Macmillan UK. pp. 5–17. doi:10.1057/9780230554832_1. ISBN 978-0-230-55483-2.
- Mark Osiel, Making Sense of Mass Atrocity. Cambridge University Press, 2009, vii + 257 pp. ISBN 978-0521861854.
- Anatoly V. Naumov and Alexei G. Kibalnik (eds), International Criminal Law. 4th ed. Moscow: Yurait Publ., 2019, 509 p. ISBN 978-5-534-11607-6
- Office of the UN Special Adviser on the Prevention of Genocide (2014). "Legal definition of genocide" (PDF). United Nations. Archived (PDF) from the original on 30 January 2016.
- Francisco-José Quintana and Justina Uriburu, The Americas in and before a Century of International Criminal Law, University of Cambridge Faculty of Law Research Paper No. 11/2022 (2022).
- Sellars, Kirsten (2013). 'Crimes Against Peace' and International Law. Cambridge University Press. ISBN 978-1-107-02884-5.
- Lyal S. Sunga, The Emerging System of International Criminal Law: Developments in Codification and Implementation. Kluwer, 1997, 508 pp. ISBN 90-411-0472-0
- Lyal S. Sunga, Individual Responsibility in International Law for Serious Human Rights Violations. Nijhoff, 1992, 252 pp. ISBN 0-7923-1453-0
- Towner, Emil B. (2011). "Quantifying Genocide: What Are We Really Counting (On)?". JAC. 31 (3/4): 625–638. ISSN 2162-5190. JSTOR 41709663.
- United Nations (2019). "Genocide Background". United Nations Office on Genocide Prevention and the Responsibility to Protect. Archived from the original on 17 April 2023.
- Voice of America (15 March 2016). "What Is Genocide?". Voice of America. Archived from the original on 11 August 2017.
- Gerhard Werle, Lovell Fernandez, Moritz Vormbaum, Africa and the International Criminal Court. Springer, 2014.
- Gerhard Werle and Florian Jessberger (eds.), Principles of International Criminal Law. Oxford etc.: Oxford University Press, 3rd. ed. 2014, ISBN 978-0-19-870359-4
- Alexander Zahar and Goran Sluiter, International Criminal Law: A Critical Introduction. Oxford: Oxford University Press, 2007, xlviii + 530 pp. ISBN 978-0-406-95904-1
