= Hans Köchler =

Austrian philosopher (born 1948)

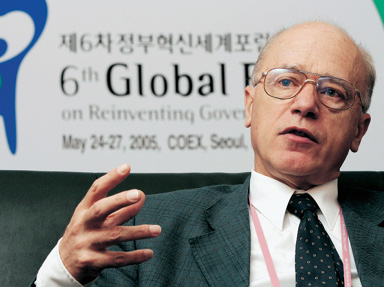
- Hans Köchler
- Born: 18 October 1948 (age 78); Schwaz, Tyrol, Austria

Philosophical work
- Era: 20th-century philosophy
- Region: Western philosophy
- School: Continental philosophy Phenomenology; Existential philosophy
- Main interests: Hermeneutics; Philosophy of law Political philosophy Philosophical anthropology
- Notable ideas: Phenomenological realism Antagonistic relationship of power and law Cultural self-comprehension of nations

Hans Köchler (born 18 October 1948) is a retired professor of philosophy at the University of Innsbruck, Austria, and president of the International Progress Organization, a non-governmental organization in consultative status with the United Nations. In his general philosophical outlook he is influenced by Husserl and Heidegger, his legal thinking has been shaped by the approach of Kelsen. Köchler has made contributions to phenomenology and philosophical anthropology and has developed a hermeneutics of trans-cultural understanding that has influenced the discourse on the relations between Islam and the West.

== Early life and academic career ==
In his student years, Hans Köchler was actively involved as a board member of the European Forum Alpbach and established contacts with leading European intellectuals and philosophers such as Manès Sperber, Hans-Georg Gadamer and Rudi Supek of the Praxis school who he invited to his lecture series that he organized from 1969 onwards. At the beginning of the 1970s, he had joined the team around Otto Molden, the founder of the European Forum Alpbach. These were his formative philosophical years; he initially developed an interest in existential philosophy, transcendental philosophy and phenomenology. In particular, he undertook an epistemological critique of Husserl's transcendental idealism and interpreted Heidegger's philosophy of Being in the sense of social critique, opening up—in the Cold War era—a dialogue with humanist philosophers of the Praxis school in Yugoslavia and in Czechoslovakia. As a doctoral student, he also had met in Alpbach with Ernst Bloch, Arthur Koestler and Karl Popper.

In 1972, Köchler graduated at the University of Innsbruck with a doctor degree in philosophy (Dr. phil.) with highest honours ("sub auspiciis praesidentis rei publicae"). In the years following his graduation he expanded his scholarly interest to philosophy of law and later political philosophy. Since the early 1970s he has been promoting the idea of inter-cultural dialogue which—since the last decade—has become known under the slogan of dialogue of civilizations. Köchler first outlined his hermeneutical philosophy of dialogue and his concept of cultural self-comprehension in lectures at the University of Innsbruck (1972) and at the Royal Scientific Society in Amman, Jordan, in March 1974 and discussed that notion in a tour around the world (March–April 1974) for which he got support and encouragement from Austrian Foreign Minister Rudolf Kirchschläger (later to become President of Austria) and in the course of which he met with intellectuals and political leaders on all continents. Among his interlocutors were Yussef el-Sebai, Minister of Culture of Egypt, Prof. S. Nurul Hasan, Minister of Education, Social Welfare and Culture of India, Mulk Raj Anand, Indian novelist, Prince Subhadradis Diskul of Thailand, Charoonphan Israngkul Na Ayudhya, Foreign Minister of Thailand, Prof. Ida Bagus Mantra, Director-General for Culture of Indonesia, and the President of Senegal, Léopold Sédar Senghor. In recognition of his contribution to the dialogue among civilizations he received an honorary doctor degree (Doctor of Humanities honoris causa) from the Mindanao State University (Philippines) (2004). In 2012 he received an honorary doctor degree from the Armenian State Pedagogical University.

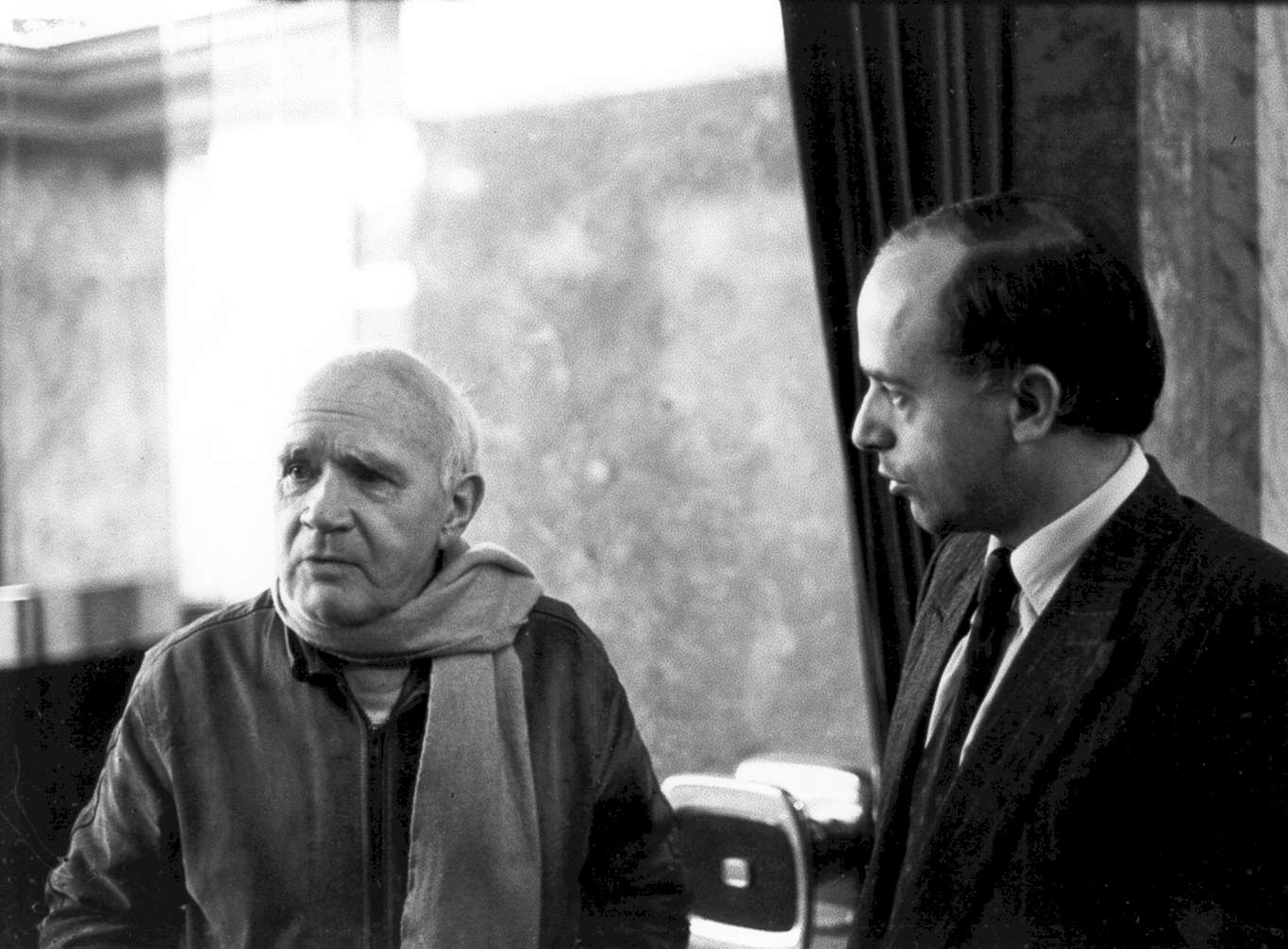
Hans Köchler, right, with French poet Jean Genet who was his guest in Vienna, Austria, for a reading from his text on Palestine in December 1983

In 1982 he was appointed as University Professor of Philosophy (with special emphasis on Political Philosophy and Philosophical Anthropology) at the University of Innsbruck. From 1990 until 2008 he has served as Chairman of the Department of Philosophy at the University of Innsbruck (Austria). In 2019 he joined the team of Berlin University of Digital Sciences. At Innsbruck University, Professor Köchler also has acted as Chairperson of the Arbeitsgemeinschaft für Wissenschaft und Politik (Working Group for Sciences and Politics) since 1971. He was a member of the Doctoral Grants Committee of the Austrian Academy of Sciences (2000–2006) and is Life Fellow—since 2010 co-president—of the International Academy for Philosophy. Since 2010 he is also a member of the advisory board of the Indian Yearbook of International Law and Policy.

Additional professorships:

- Visiting Professor at the University of Malaya, Kuala Lumpur, Malaysia (1998).
- Visiting Professorial Lecturer at the Polytechnic University of the Philippines, Manila (since 2004).
- Honorary Professor of Philosophy at Pamukkale University, Turkey (since 2008).
- Member of the Faculty, Center for Cultural Diplomacy Studies, Berlin, Germany (since 2018)

== Research ==
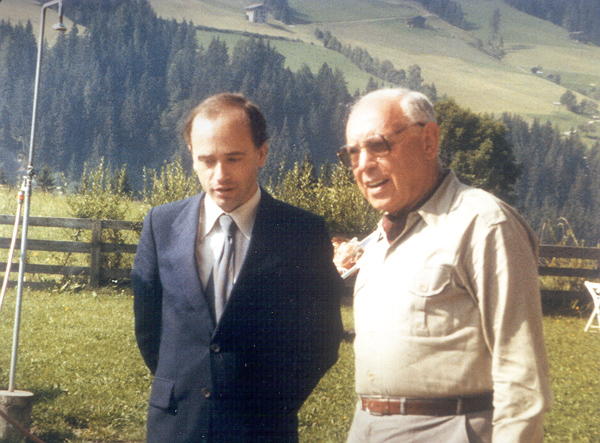
Hans Köchler, left, and Polish philosopher Adam Schaff at the European Forum Alpbach, August 1980

During the 1970s, he co-operated with Cardinal Karol Wojtyła of Kraków, later to become Pope John Paul II, within the framework of the International Society for Phenomenology. He published the first comment articles on the future Pope's anthropological conception. During the 1980s he engaged in a critique of legal positivism (Philosophie—Recht—Politik, 1985) and developed a theory according to which human rights are the basis of the validity of international law (Die Prinzipien des Völkerrechts und die Menschenrechte, 1981). He also dealt with the applicability of democracy in inter-state relations (Democracy in International Relations, 1986). Legal theory led him to questions of political philosophy, and in particular a critique of the representative paradigm of democracy. During the 1990s Köchler got increasingly involved in questions of world order—including the role and philosophical foundations of civilizational dialogue—and in what he has called the dialectic relationship between power and law. Köchler's bibliography contains more than 700 books, reports and scholarly articles in several languages (Albanian, Arabic, Chinese, English, French, German, Italian, Japanese, Korean, Persian, Spanish, Serbo-Croat, Turkish). His publications deal with issues of phenomenology, existential philosophy, anthropology, human rights, philosophy of law, theory of international law, international criminal law, United Nations reform, theory of democracy, etc. He acts as editor of the series Studies in International Relations (Vienna), Veröffentlichungen der Arbeitsgemeinschaft für Wissenschaft und Politik (Innsbruck), and as member of the editorial board of the international academic journal Hekmat va Falsafeh (Wisdom and Philosophy), published by the Philosophy Department of Allameh Tabatabaii University, Iran.

Köchler has served in several committees and expert groups dealing with issues of international democracy, human rights and development such as the Research Network on Transnational Democracy sponsored by the European Commission; the Council of Europe's Expert Group on Democratic Citizenship (1998–2000); and the Asia-Europe Foundation’s expert meeting on Cultural, Religious and Social Conceptions of Justice in Asia & Europe (Singapore, 2004).

Köchler calls in his research paper "The “Global War on Terror” and its Implications for Muslim-Western Relations " presented during the International Roundtable Conference at the University of Sains Malaysia, Centre for Policy Research and International Studies (CenPRIS) Penang, Malaysia, during 13–14 December 2007, the "official narrative" of 9/11, told by the American authorities, an "official conspiracy theory". Moreover, he claims that the Western establishment refuses to investigate what really happened on 9/11 and this is part of a collective denial process.

== Non-governmental organizations (NGOs) ==
Köchler is the Founder and President (since 1972) of the International Progress Organization (I.P.O.), an international non-governmental organization (NGO) in consultative status with the United Nations and with a membership in over 70 countries, representing all continents. He was the founder and Secretary-General (1973-1977) of Euregio Alpina (Study Group for the Alpine Region), a transnational planning structure for the Alpine region and predecessor of the new concept of the "Euro Regions" in the framework of the European Union. During the 1970s and 1980s Köchler participated in the international phenomenological movement and organized several conferences and colloquia on the phenomenology of the life-world; he was the organizer of the Eighth International Phenomenological Conference in Salzburg (1980) and is the co-founder of the Austrian Society of Phenomenology. Other activities or functions:

- Coordinator of the International Committee for Palestinian Human Rights (ICPHR) (1988–);
- Co-founder of the European Ombudsman Institute (1988);
- Vice-chairman of the Jamahir Society for Culture and Philosophy and chairman of the Society's editorial board, Vienna (1991–2004);
- Member of the board, NGO Committee on Development at the United Nations Center in Vienna (1994–);
- Member of the advisory council of the International Movement for a Just World (Malaysia) (1997–);
- Convenor (Austria) of the International Movement for a Just World (JUST) (1997–2004);
- Member of the international advisory panel of the Center for Civilizational Dialogue at the University of Malaya (Kuala Lumpur) (1997–);
- Member of the international advisory council of the Committee for a Democratic United Nations, Germany (2003–);
- Member of the international advisory board of the "Youth for the Alliance of Civilizations," an initiative of the Islamic Conference Youth Forum for Dialogue and Cooperation (2007–).

== International impact ==
Köchler has been the organizer of major international conferences in the fields of transnational co-operation, democracy, human rights, terrorism, and conflict resolution, among them the "International Conference on the European Vocation of the Alpine Region" in Innsbruck (1971), which initiated transborder co-operation in Europe and the development towards the "Euro Regions" within the EU; the "International Conference on the Question of Terrorism" in Geneva (1987); and the "Second International Conference On A More Democratic United Nations" (CAMDUN-2) at the Vienna headquarters of the United Nations (1991). In 1996 he acted as chairman of the final session and co-ordinator of the Drafting Committee of the "International Conference on Democracy and Terrorism" in New Delhi. In March 2002 he delivered the 14th Centenary Lecture at the Supreme Court of the Philippines on "The United Nations, the International Rule of Law and Terrorism." On 1 September 2004 he delivered the Foundation Day Speech at Mindanao State University, Islamic City of Marawi, on "The Dialogue of Civilizations and the Future of World Order."

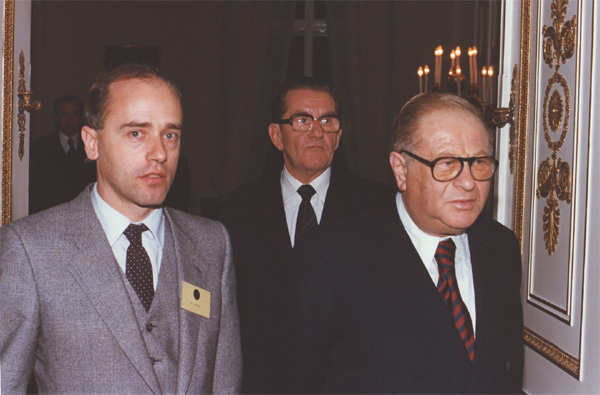
Hans Köchler, left, and Austrian Federal Chancellor Bruno Kreisky, right, at the Federal Chancellery in Vienna, November 1980

Through his research and civil society initiatives, Professor Köchler made major contributions to the debate on international democracy and United Nations reform, in particular reform of the Security Council. This was acknowledged by international figures such as the German Foreign Minister Klaus Kinkel in 1993. In 1985, he organized the first colloquium on "Democracy in International Relations" on the occasion of the 40th anniversary of the United Nations in New York.

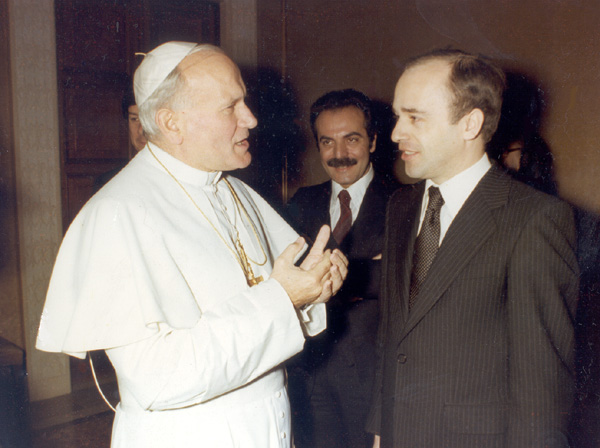
Hans Köchler with Pope John Paul II in the Vatican, February 1979

In the framework of his activities as President of the International Progress Organization, he co-operated with numerous international figures such as the Founder President of Senegal, Léopold Sédar Senghor, on the issue of civilizational dialogue; Crown Prince Hassan of Jordan and Cardinal Franz König of Austria on Islamic-Christian understanding; Leo Mates, Secretary-General of the first Non-Aligned summit in Belgrade in 1961, on the principles and future of the non-aligned movement (N)i;

During the Pope Benedict XVI Islam controversy, he wrote in a commentary: "In his lecture preaching the compatibility of reason and faith, Benedict XVI, the scholar, deliberately overlooks the fact that the insights of Greek philosophy – its commitment to the λόγος – have been brought to medieval Christian Europe by the great Muslim thinkers of the Middle Ages. What he calls the 'encounter between the Biblical message and Greek thought' ... was, to a large extent, the result of the influence of Muslim philosophers – at a time when European Christians were totally ignorant of classical Greek philosophy."

Köchler is also an outspoken critic of the International Criminal Tribunal for the former Yugoslavia and has condemned its inception and practice by citing provisions of international law.

He came to prominence in the world of international politics when he was nominated, on 25 April 2000, by then UN Secretary-General Kofi Annan as an observer at the Pan Am Flight 103 (Lockerbie) bombing trial. His critical reports on the trial and appeal proceedings contributed to a global debate on the politicization of international criminal justice.

== Major works ==
- Die Subjekt-Objekt-Dialektik in der transzendentalen Phänomenologie. Das Seinsproblem zwischen Idealismus und Realismus. (Monographien zur philosophischen Forschung, vol. 112.) Meisenheim a. G.: Anton Hain, 1974.
- Skepsis und Gesellschaftskritik im Denken Martin Heideggers. Monographien zur philosophischen Forschung, vol. 158. Meisenheim a. G.: Anton Hain, 1978.
- Philosophie – Recht – Politik. Abhandlungen zur politischen Philosophie und zur Rechtsphilosophie. Veröffentlichungen der Arbeitsgemeinschaft für Wissenschaft und Politik an der Universität Innsbruck, vol. 4. Vienna/New York: Springer-Verlag, 1985.
- (ed.) The Principles of Non-Alignment. London: Third World Centre, 1982.
- Phenomenological Realism. Selected Essays. Frankfurt a. M./Bern: Peter Lang, 1986.
- Politik und Theologie bei Heidegger. Politischer Aktionismus und theologische Mystik nach "Sein und Zeit." Veröffentlichungen der Arbeitsgemeinschaft für Wissenschaft und Politik an der Universität Innsbruck, vol. 7. Innsbruck: Arbeitsgemeinschaft für Wissenschaft und Politik, 1991.
- Democracy and the International Rule of Law. Propositions for an Alternative World Order. Selected Papers Published on the Occasion of the Fiftieth Anniversary of the United Nations. Vienna/New York: Springer-Verlag, 1995.
- Neue Wege der Demokratie. Demokratie im globalen Spannungsfeld von Machtpolitik und Rechtsstaatlichkeit. Vienna/New York: Springer-Verlag, 1998.
- Manila Lectures 2002. Terrorism and the Quest for a Just World Order. Quezon City (Manila): FSJ Book World, 2002.
- Global Justice or Global Revenge? International Criminal Justice at the Crossroads. Philosophical Reflections on the Principles of the International Legal Order Published on the Occasion of the Thirtieth Anniversary of the Foundation of the International Progress Organization. SpringerScience. Vienna/New York: Springer-Verlag, 2003.
- (Arabic) المسلمون والغرب: من الصراع إلى الحوار (The Muslims and the West: From Confrontation to Dialogue). Casablanca, Morocco: TOP Edition, 2009.
- World Order: Vision and Reality. Collected Papers Edited by David Armstrong. Studies in International Relations, Vol. XXXI. New Delhi: Manak, 2009.
- Global Justice or Global Revenge? The ICC and the Politicization of International Criminal Justice in International Criminal Law and Human Rights, Manoj Kumar Sinha (ed.) (Manak Publications, New Delhi, 2010)
- The Security Council as Administrator of Justice? Reflections on the Antagonistic Relationship between Power and Law. Vienna: International Progress Organization, 2011.
- Force or Dialogue: Conflicting Paradigms of World Order. Collected Papers Edited by David Armstrong. Studies in International Relations, Vol. XXXIII. New Delhi: Manak, 2015.
- Challenges and Contradictions of World Order: A Reader. Studies in International Relations, Vol. XXXVII. Vienna: International Progress Organization, 2022.
- MMXXII : WAR OR PEACE. Vienna: International Progress Organization, 2023.

== Bibliography ==
- Complete bibliography
- Titles in the Library of Congress Catalogue

== Commentaries on Köchler's works ==
- Peut-on parler d'un "scepticisme" heideggérien? Emilio Brito, Heidegger et l'hymne du sacré. Leuven: Leuven University Press / Uitgeverij Peeters, 1999, pp. 615-621. (French)
- Hans Köchler. Global Justice or Global Revenge. International Criminal Justice at the Crossroads. REVIEW. Quezon City, Metro Manila: H. Koechler Political and Philosophical Society, 2004.
- The Great Power Balance, the United Nations and What the Framers Intended: In Partial Response to Hans Köchler. C.L. Lim in: Chinese Journal of International Law (2007), pp. 1-22.

== Publications about Hans Köchler ==
- [Biographical sketches of the members of the International Academy for Philosophy]: "Hans Köchler," in: News and Views, No. 13 (November 2006). Yerevan (Armenia)/Athens (Greece)/Berkeley (USA): International Academy for Philosophy, 2006, pp. 46-53.
- Fatemah Remedios C. Balbin (ed.), Hans Köchler Bibliography and Reader. Quezon City, Metro Manila: Hans Koechler Political and Philosophical Society & Foundation for Social Justice, 2007. ISBN 978-3-900719-04-3
- Marie-Luisa Frick and Andreas Oberprantacher (eds.), Power and Justice in International Relations: Interdisciplinary Approaches to Global Challenges. (Essays in Honour of Hans Köchler.) Farnham (Surrey), UK: Ashgate, 2009. ISBN 978-0-7546-7771-0
- ھكذا تكلم كوكلر في الفلسفة والفكر وحوار الثقافات والسياسة العالمية. Translated from German by Hamid Lechhab. Preface by Adnan Yasin. 2nd, enlarged edition. Amman: Khotout wa-dilal, 2022. ISBN 978-9923-40-598-7

== See also ==
- Hans Köchler's Lockerbie trial observer mission
- Global Justice or Global Revenge?
