= Wadner =

Wadner may refer to:

== Villages in Maharshtra state, India ==
- Wadner, Buldhana
- Wadner Bk, Ahmednagar district
- Wadner, Ahmednagar district - see List of villages in Rahuri taluka

== People and fictional characters ==
- Britt Wadner (1915–1987), Swedish pirate radio manager
- Tyra Wadner (1891–1967), founder of the Swedish Svenska Lottakåren (Swedish Women's Voluntary Defence Organization)
- Joachim Wadner, a character in Tajemnica Statuetki, a video game
