= Svärd =

Svärd, meaning "Sword", is a surname of Swedish origin which may refer to:

== People ==
- Anna Svärd (born 1973), Swedish curler
- Catharina Elmsäter-Svärd (born 1965), Swedish politician of the Moderate Party
- Gunilla Svärd (born 1970), Swedish orienteering competitor
- Nils Svärd (1908–2001), Swedish cross country skier who competed in the early 1930s
- Oskar Svärd (born 1976), Swedish cross-country skier
- Sebastian Svärd (born 1983), Danish footballer

== Other ==
- Lotta Svärd (poem), part of Johan Ludvig Runeberg's epic poem The Tales of Ensign Stål
- Lotta Svärd, Finnish voluntary auxiliary paramilitary organization for women
