= Suoma af Hällström =

- Born: Suoma Helena Lindstedt; 10 March 1881
- Died: 3 November 1954 (aged 73)
- Other names: Suoma Loimaranta after 1906
- Occupations: Doctor, member of the Lotta Svärd

Suoma Helena Loimaranta-Airila, (first married surname af Hällström), (née Lindstedt; surname Finnicized to Loimaranta before marriage) (10 March 1881 – 3 November 1954) was a Finnish doctor and an active member of the Lotta Svärd women's auxiliary paramilitary organisation.

== Early life and education ==
Suoma Helena Lindsted was born on 10 March 1881 in Kuopio, Northern Savonia, Finland to Hilma (née Nyholm) and Wilhelm Lindstedt, a county vicar. Loimaranta graduated from high school in 1901. She and a number of her siblings changed their Swedish surname to the Finnish Loimaranta in 1906 as part of the Finnicization surname switch inspired by Romantic nationalism. About 70,000 Finns changed their surnames between 1906 and 1907 in response to a call from author Johannes Linnankoski to mark the centenary of the Finnish nationalist, philosopher and statesman Johan Vilhelm Snellman.

Suoma Loimaranta qualified as a licensed doctor of medicine in 1910. Dr. Loimaranta became a specialist in pulmonary diseases in 1916.

== Medical career ==
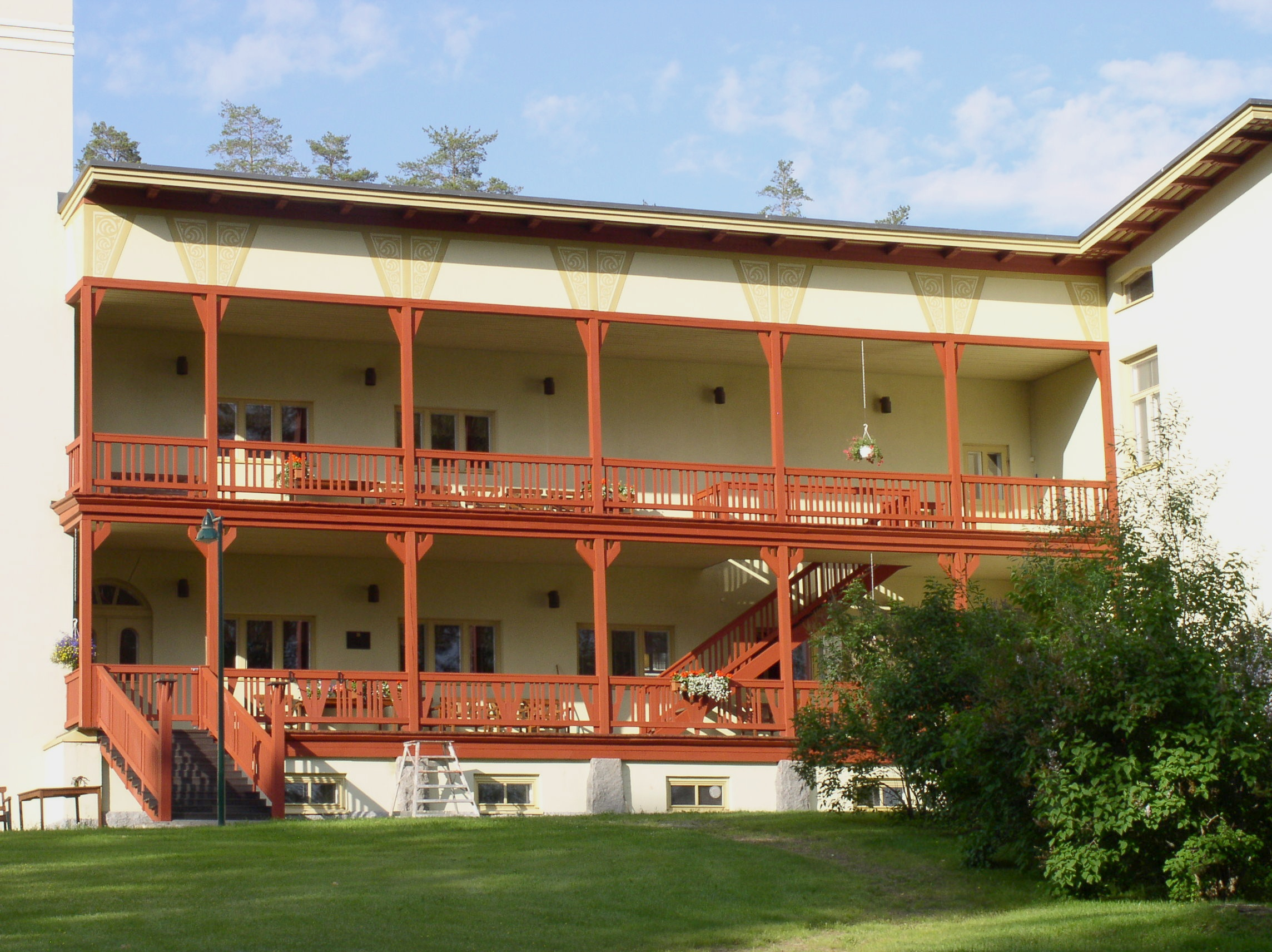
Takaharju Sanatorium

Dr. Suoma Loimaranta worked as an assistant doctor at the Takaharju sanatorium from 1910 to 1915, and as a Medical Board doctor in 1915–1916. She then held the posts of district doctor in Lohja, Kurkijoen and Tampere, and worked as an infectious diseases inspector in Tornio and Lauritsala. During the 1918 Finnish Civil War, she was the doctor at the anti communist White's Field Hospital No. V. The following year she became the chief doctor of the Tampere prison camp, set up after White forces led by General Mannerheim captured the city after the Battle of Tampere, taking about 10,000 Red prisoners on 6 April 1918.

== Personal life ==
Loimaranta married twice. Her first marriage, on 22 June 1919, was to fellow Tampere doctor Ernst Gustaf Wilhelm af Hällström (1863–1931), after which she was known as Suoma af Hällström. After being widowed, she married her cousin, Dr Kaarlo Martti Airila (1878–1953) in 1934 and used the surname Loimaranta-Airila.

== Lotta Svärd and political beliefs ==
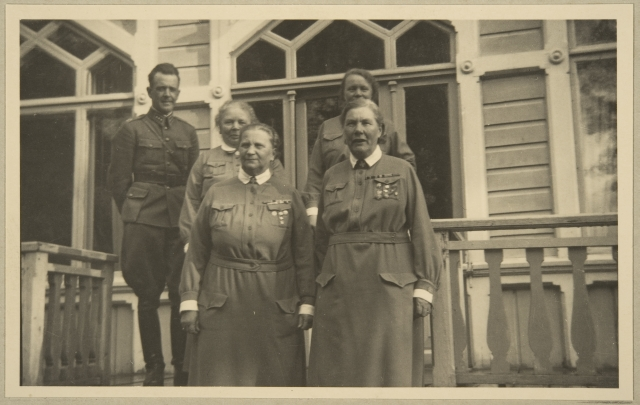
Fanni Luukkonen (left front) and Suoma Loimaranta-Airila (right front)

Suoma af Hällström was active in and a key player in the Lotta Svärd women's auxiliary paramilitary organisation. She was the head of the sanitation and later the medical section of the Tampere local branch of the organisation between 1919-1926 and 1930–1935. She was chairman of the North Häme district from its foundation in 1921 until 1936. Her husband, Ernst af Hällström, was an active member of the radical Finnish nationalist, fascist, pro-German and anti-communist political Lapua movement in the 1920s and 1930s, and she took a supportive view of the organisation. In 1921 she was elected a member of the central board of the Lotta Svärd, and the following year she was appointed head of the organisation's medical section, a post she had previously held in 1921. With Greta Silvenius, she drew up the rules of procedure for the medical section at the very beginning of the Lotta's activities in 1921. af Hällström resigned from the central board at the 1924 annual meeting, probably because of disagreements within the nascent organisation. Disputes concerned the use of money, but also the then burning issue of language, between Finnish and Swedish speakers. The culture of the upper-class, mainly noble Swedish speaking women irritated the middle class Finnish-speakers and led to divisions. When Suoma af Hällström returned to the Lotta management team in 1927, the Finnish-speakers had become the majority.

In 1929, Suoma af Hällström was nominated for the presidency of the organisation following the resignation of Helmi Arneberg-Pentti but Fanni Luukkonen was elected and built the organisation's numbers in the 1930s.

In 1938, by then going by the name Suoma Loimaranta-Airila, she and Eva Tulenheimo were representative of the Lotta organisation in Germany as a guest of the Nazi Party's women's organisation.

Under Loimaranta-Airila's leadership, military field hospitals were conceived and equipped in the 1930s. It was the Lotta's most important project in the 1930s. After the outbreak of the Second World War, known in Finland as the 1939-1940 Winter War and the 1941-1944 Continuation War, she held medical posts in several places. Her most important role was as head of the medical section of the Lotta Svärd organisation, supporting the medical care of Finnish troops. The effective operation of the Lottas during the war is largely credited to Loimaranta-Airila.

In 1942, at the age of 61, Loimaranta-Airila resigned from the central executive committee and stepped down as head of the medical section of Lotta Svärd, at which time she was invited to become an honorary member of the organisation.

Loimaranta died in 1954 at the age of 73.
