= Order of the German Eagle =

Nazi German award given to sympathetic foreigners

Order of Merit of the German Eagle Verdienstorden vom Deutschen Adler (German)
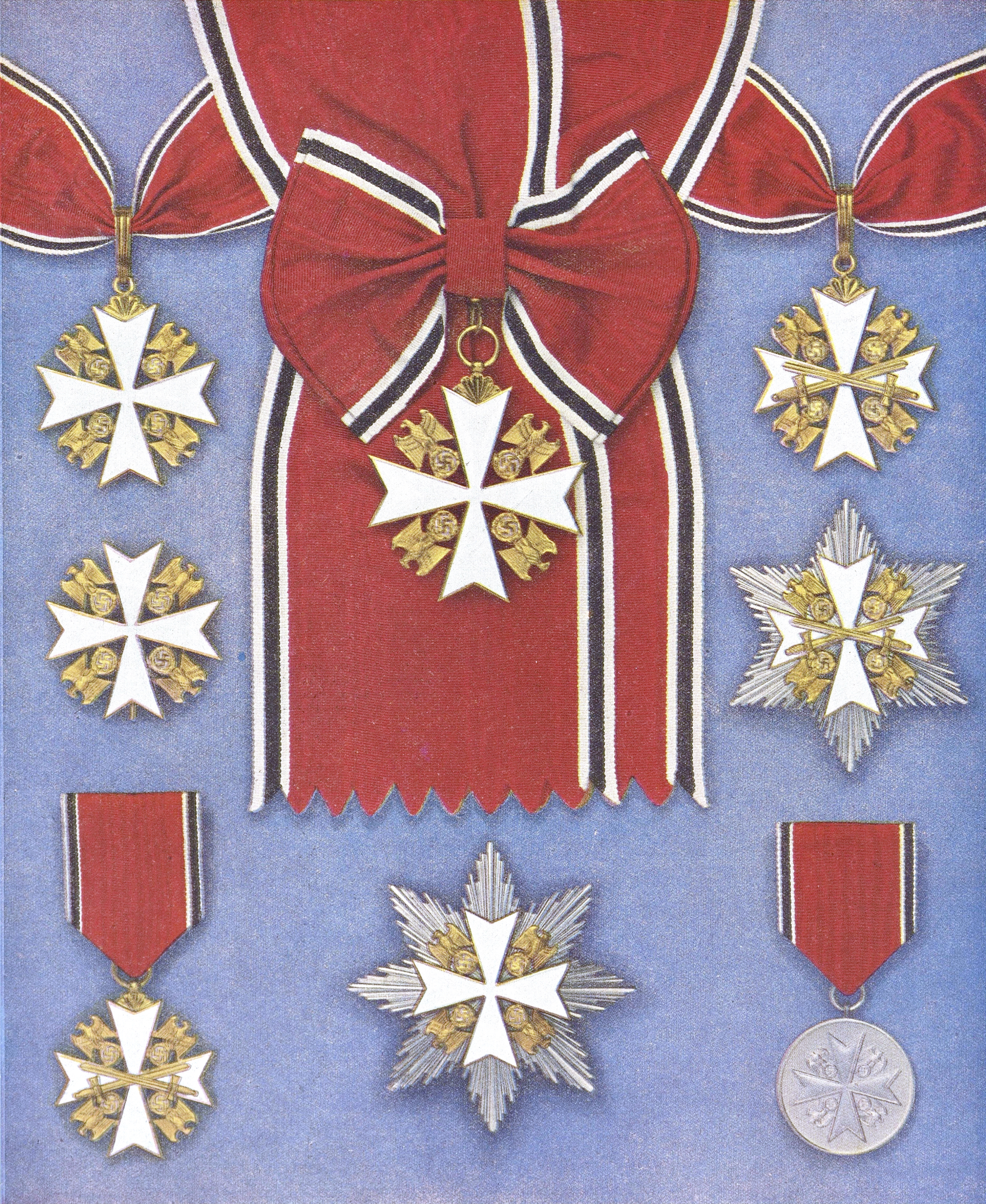
- All classes, 1942

Awarded by Nazi Germany
- Type: Order of merit
- Established: 1 May 1937
- Eligibility: German citizens and foreign nationals
- Awarded for: military and civil services
- Status: Defunct
- Grades: Nine (1943–1945)
- Former grades: Six (1937–1943)

The Order of Merit of the German Eagle (German: Verdienstorden vom Deutschen Adler) was an award of the German Nazi regime, predominantly to foreign diplomats. The Order was instituted on 1 May 1937 by Adolf Hitler. It ceased to be awarded following the collapse of Nazi Germany at the end of World War II in Europe. The wearing of the Order of Merit of the German Eagle is prohibited in the Federal Republic of Germany.

== Criteria ==
The Order of Merit of the German Eagle was a diplomatic and honorary award given to prominent foreigners, particularly diplomats.

In addition to awards to non-Germans, the Reich Foreign Minister and the Reich Protector of Bohemia and Moravia received a 'Special Class' (Sonderstufe), with identical insignia to the Grand Cross of the Order. Accordingly, Foreign Minister Constantin von Neurath received the Special Class of the Order, with a further award to Joachim von Ribbentrop on his appointment as Foreign Minister in 1938. In 1943 Dr. Wilhelm Frick received the Special Class after becoming Reich Protector of Bohemia and Moravia.

== Appearance and classes ==
The Cross is based on the Maltese Cross with German Eagles at each corner carrying a swastika. For military recipients the Order also featured crossed swords. The cross was suspended from a 46 millimetres (1.8 in) red ribbon with stripes in black, red and white. The award, in the first two classes, also came in the form of a silver or gold eight pointed star, with corresponding white Maltese Cross and gold eagles centered. The overall appearance and name of the Order resembled the Prussian Order of the Black Eagle, Order of the Red Eagle and Order of Saint John (Bailiwick of Brandenburg).

From 1937 to 1943 the Order was presented in six classes:

1. Grand Cross of the Order of the German Eagle with star (Grosskreuz des Deutschen Adlerordens)
2. Order of the German Eagle with Star (Deutscher Adlerorden mit Stern)
3. Order of the German Eagle 1st Class (Deutscher Adlerorden, Erste Stufe)
4. Order of the German Eagle 2nd Class (Deutscher Adlerorden, Zweite Stufe)
5. Order of the German Eagle 3rd Class (Deutscher Adlerorden, Dritte Stufe)
6. German Medal of Merit (Deutsche Verdienstmedaille)

A unique Grand Cross of the Order of Merit of the German Eagle in Gold with Diamonds (Grosskreuz des Deutschen Adlerordens in Gold und Brillanten) was also awarded to Benito Mussolini on 25 September 1937.

On 27 December 1943 the Order was reorganised into nine classes:

1. Grand Cross of the Order of the German Eagle in Gold with Star (Goldenes Grosskreuz des Deutschen Adlerordens)
2. Grand Cross of the Order of the German Eagle with Star (Grosskreuz des Deutschen Adlerordens)
3. Order of the German Eagle 1st Class (Deutscher Adlerorden, Erste Stufe)
4. Order of the German Eagle 2nd Class (Deutscher Adlerorden, Zweite Stufe)
5. Order of the German Eagle 3rd Class (Deutscher Adlerorden, Dritte Stufe)
6. Order of the German Eagle 4th Class (Deutscher Adlerorden, Vierte Stufe)
7. Order of the German Eagle 5th Class (Deutscher Adlerorden, Fünfte Stufe)
8. Silver Medal of Merit (Silberne Verdienstmedaille)
9. Bronze Medal of Merit (Bronzene Verdienstmedaille)

== Recipients ==
=== Grand Cross with Diamonds ===
- Benito Mussolini, Italy

=== Grand Cross with Star ===
The Grand Cross of the Order of Merit of the German Eagle in Gold was awarded sixteen times:

- Ion Antonescu, Chief-of-staff of the Romanian army
- King Boris III of Bulgaria
- Galeazzo Ciano Conte di Cortelazzo, Italy
- Roberto Farinacci, Italy
- Francisco Franco, Spanish dictator, de facto Regent of Spain and general (last holder of the Grand Cross at the time of his death in 1975).
- Dr. Wilhelm Frick, Reichsminister
- Admiral Miklós Horthy, Hungary
- Johann Ludwig Graf Schwerin von Krosigk, Reich Minister of Finance
- Field Marshal Carl Gustaf Emil Mannerheim, Commander-in-Chief of the Finnish armed forces
- Konstantin Freiherr von Neurath, Reich Foreign Minister
- General Hideki Tojo, Japanese Prime Minister
- General Hiroshi Ōshima, Japanese ambassador
- Admiral Isoroku Yamamoto, Commander In Chief of the Combined Fleet
- Joachim von Ribbentrop, Reich Foreign Minister
- Risto Ryti, President of Finland
- Jozef Tiso, Roman Catholic priest, President of the First Slovak Republic

=== Grand Cross ===
- Luang Praditmanutham (Pridi Banomyong), Minister of Foreign Affairs of Thailand, 1938.
- Phya Rajawangsan, Thai envoy extraordinary and minister plenipotentiary to Germany (based in London), 1938
- Prince Wan Waithayakon of Siam, 1938
- Count General Terauchi Hisaichi was awarded the Grand Cross of the Order of the German Eagle on 25 January 1938.
- Henry Ford was awarded the Grand Cross of the German Eagle on his 75th birthday, 30 July 1938.
- General Ljubomir Marić, Yugoslavian Defense Minister, 21 November 1938.
- Ivo Andrić was awarded the Grand Cross of the German Eagle, 19 April 1939.
- Japanese Admiral Isoroku Yamamoto was awarded the Grand Cross of the Order of the German Eagle on 9 February 1940.
- Swedish explorer Sven Hedin was awarded the Grand Cross of the Order of the German Eagle on his 75th birthday on 19 February 1940.
- General Olof Thörnell, Supreme Commander of the Swedish Armed Forces, was awarded the Grand Cross of the Order of the German Eagle 7 October 1940.
- Swedish banker and industrial leader Jacob Wallenberg, awarded the Grand Cross of the Order of the German Eagle, Berlin 1941.
- Achille Starace, Secretary of the Fascist Party of Italy
- Serafino Mazzolini, Foreign Minister, Fascist Party of Italy 1943

=== Other classes ===
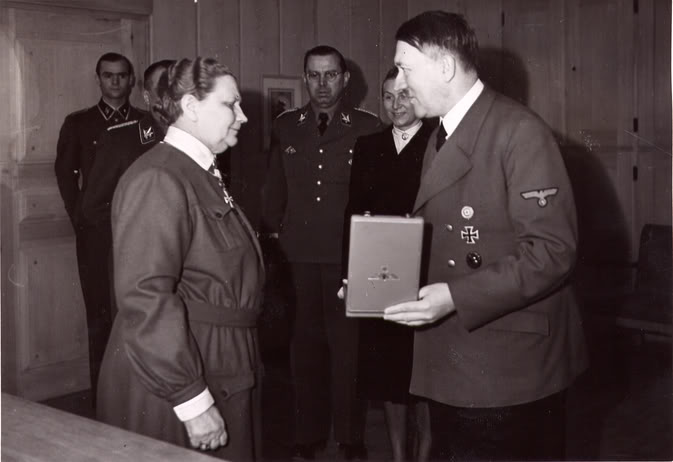
Fanni Luukkonen was awarded the Order of the German Eagle from Adolf Hitler on 19 May 1943.

Number awarded unknown.

- Emil Kirdof, director of the Gelsenkirchen industrial consortium (awarded by Hitler on 8 April 1937).
- Thomas J. Watson, chairman of IBM, 1937. Watson was also president of the International Chamber of Commerce in 1937; the medal was awarded while the ICC was meeting in Germany that year. He returned it to Hitler in 1940.
- Ernest G. Liebold, Henry Ford's private secretary, was awarded Order of the German Eagle 1st Class in September 1938.
- Plaek Phibunsongkhram, Prime Minister of Thailand. was awarded Order of the German Eagle 1st Class in 1939
- Charles Lindbergh was awarded the Order of the German Eagle with Star on 19 October 1938.
- James Mooney, General Motors' chief executive for overseas operations, was awarded Order of the German Eagle 1st Class on 9 June 1938.
- Giovanni Gentile, Knight of the Order of the German Eagle Class II (July 1940).
- Tomoyuki Yamashita, Knight of the Order of the German Eagle, 1st Class.
- Ing. Ugo Conte (1884–1951), Rome Chief Engineer, was awarded Order of the German Eagle 2nd Class on 16 December 1938 for leading team in the construction of first German motorway.
- Finnish Minister of Defence Rudolf Walden was awarded the Grand Cross of the Order of the German Eagle.
- Finnish leader of the Lotta Svärd organization Fanni Luukkonen was awarded the Order of the German Eagle with Star in 1943. She was the only non-German woman to receive the medal.
- Carlos de Aymerich y Muñoz de Baena (1896-1980), Spanish officer, awarded 2nd class order June, 1, 1939.
- Hungarian Captain Ladislaus Janik von Emoke awarded Order of the German Eagle 3rd Class on 6th July, 1943.

== See also ==
- Orders, decorations, and medals of Nazi Germany
- Order of the Red Eagle (Prussian)
- Order of the Black Eagle (Prussian)
- Order of Saint John (Bailiwick of Brandenburg) (Prussian)
