= Fanni Luukkonen =

Leader of the Finnish Lotta Svärd auxiliary organisation for women (1882–1947)

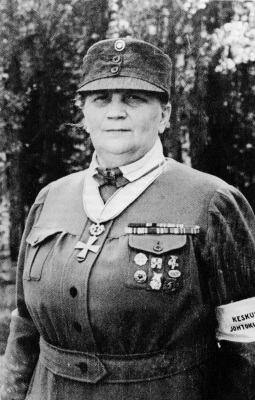
- Born: Fanni Maria Luukkonen; 13 March 1882; Oulu, Grand Duchy of Finland
- Died: 27 October 1947 (aged 65); Helsinki, Finland
- Burial place: Kruununsaari cemetery, Ii, Finland
- Citizenship: Finnish
- Known for: President of Lotta Svärd 1929–1944

Fanni Maria Luukkonen (13 March 1882 – 27 October 1947) was a Finnish teacher and the longtime leader of Lotta Svärd, the Finnish voluntary auxiliary organisation for women. She served as its president from 1929 until its dissolution in 1944, during which time the organisation grew from around 60,000 to over 200,000 members, making it the largest women's organisation in Finnish history. In 1940 she became the first woman to receive the Order of the Cross of Liberty, 1st Class with swords, and in 1943 she was the only non-German woman to be awarded the Order of the German Eagle with Star.

== Early life and education ==
Fanni Maria Luukkonen was born in Oulu, in what was then the Grand Duchy of Finland, an autonomous part of the Russian Empire. She was the middle of three children of Katariina Sofia (née Palmgren) and Olli Luukkonen, a machine operator at Oulu's first electric power station. The family was religious (Protestant), supported temperance and enjoyed spending time at sea, which had a lifelong impact on their daughter. The young Fanni was a good sailor and keen on sports, particularly gymnastics.

Luukkonen studied at the Oulu Girls' School where her class teacher was Angelika Wenell (1857–1940), a well-known advocate of the Finnish Lutheran revival movement, who had a strong influence on her future outlook. Luukkonen later studied at the Finnish Further Education College in Helsinki. A deep personal religiosity, inherited from her childhood home, remained with her throughout her life and shaped her many later speeches and public statements. She also became active in the temperance movement, which she regarded as an important national cause and continued to champion throughout her life.

== Teaching career ==
Luukkonen graduated from secondary school in 1902 and qualified as a primary school teacher in 1906. Her first teaching post was in Oulu from 1906 to 1913, after which she moved to Sortavala, in Finnish Karelia, where she served as head teacher of a girls' training school between 1913 and 1931. Her mother moved with her and kept house until her death.

Luukkonen's political awareness had been shaped early by the February Manifesto of 1899, which curtailed the legislative autonomy of the Grand Duchy of Finland and inaugurated the first period of Russification. The manifesto had a shocking effect on the young Luukkonen and her fellow students, who wore black throughout the following spring. She later wrote that "This first patriotic twinge was deepened by the continuing events of the royal years, which provided a compelling impetus to take part in the constitutional struggle. It was followed by the great strikes, which a person who loved his country lived not to forget, but to prepare for something greater." Her sense of Finnish nationalism grew stronger during her years in Sortavala, which was particularly affected by Russian oppression.

== Character and outlook ==
Luukkonen was not outwardly expressive. Those who knew her later in life described her as warm and maternal, though she remained somewhat reserved throughout her life. Her friends considered her dependable and loyal. She valued company and kept up a wide correspondence, but rarely spoke of personal matters or feelings; conversation with her tended to centre on work and wider social questions.

== Finnish Civil War ==
Sortavala, in Ladogan Karelia, had been a centre of the Finnish independence and nationalism movement from the late 19th century, which met harsh retaliation from the Russian authorities. Teachers and students at the seminary had to be cautious, but the oppression sharpened the nationalist spirit among them, and Luukkonen and many of her compatriots grew more radical.

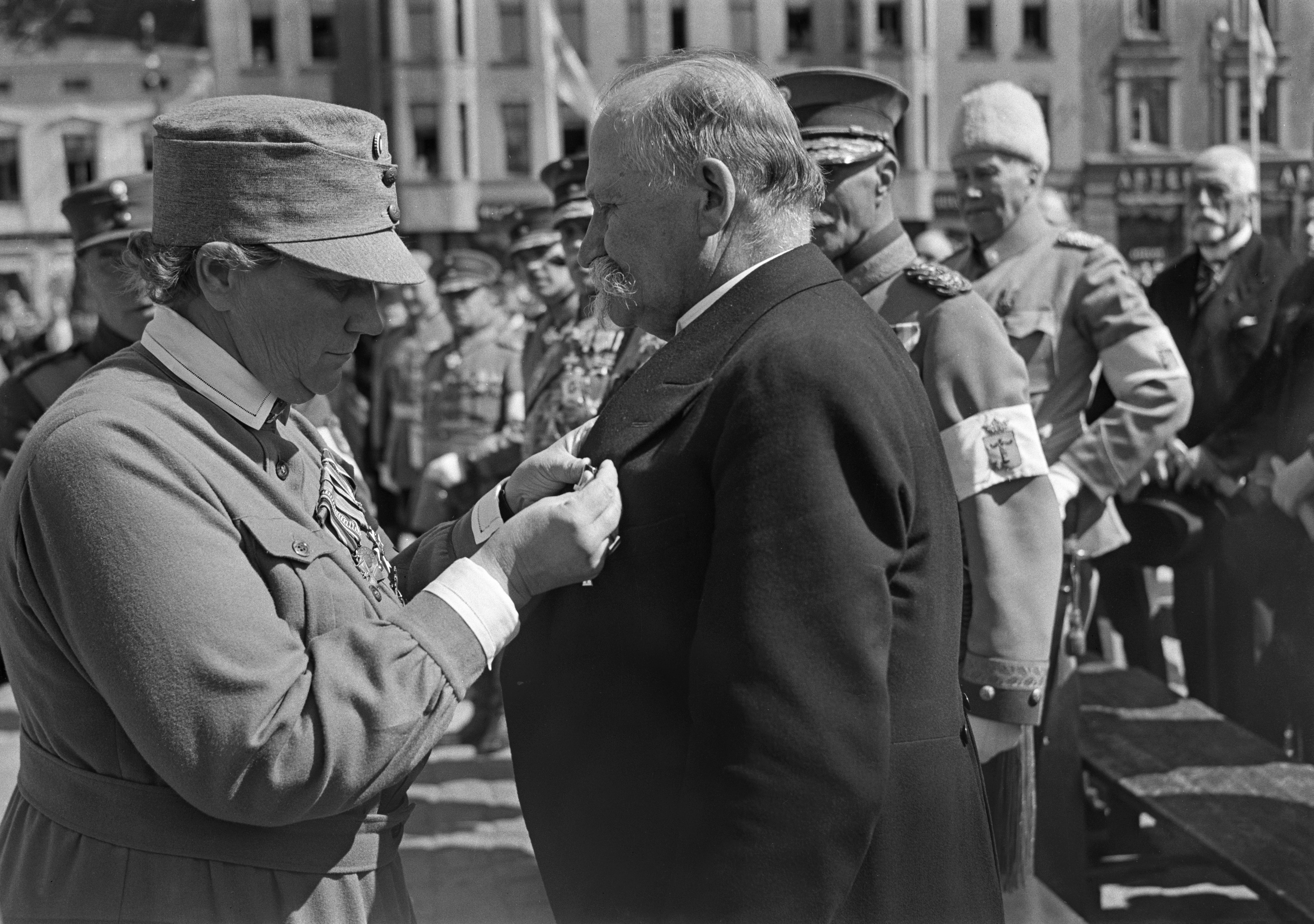
Fanni Luukkonen attaching a medal to the lapel of President Kyösti Kallio at the unveiling of the Statue of Liberty (Finland) in Vaasa 1938

The 1917 February Revolution and the subsequent Russian Revolution led to the Finnish Declaration of Independence on 6 December 1917. Political conditions were unsettled, and in the autumn of 1917 a White Guard unit was founded in Sortavala by the town council; in January 1918 it seized weapons from the remaining Russian troops.

With the outbreak of the Finnish Civil War in January 1918, most of the male students at the seminary left for the front, and the college buildings were requisitioned by the military. Luukkonen undertook auxiliary work in support of the soldiers, and for three years lived in the college surrounded by military barracks. She observed at close quarters what kinds of tasks women could perform in support of military operations and how such work might be organised – an experience that shaped her later work with the Lotta Svärd.

== Leadership of Lotta Svärd ==
After the Civil War, Luukkonen joined the Lotta Svärd women's organisation. She became known for her work ethic and was elected district secretary in 1921, joined the central board in 1925, and in 1929 was unanimously elected president of the organisation, succeeding Helmi Arneberg-Pentti.

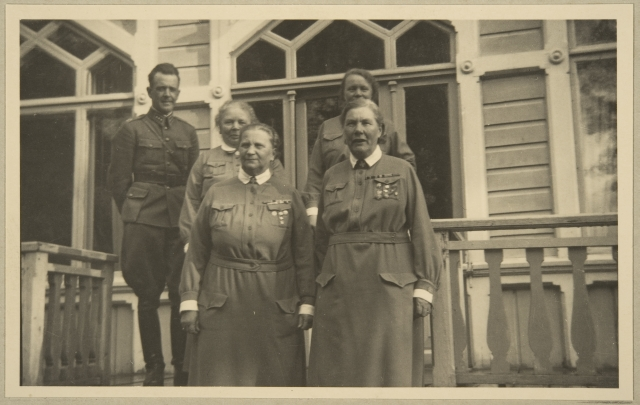
Fanni Luukkonen (left front) and Suoma Loimaranta-Airila (right front)

At the time of Luukkonen's election the organisation had around 60,000 members. Under her leadership, membership passed 100,000 by 1938 and continued to rise during the war years, exceeding 200,000 by the time the organisation was dissolved in 1944. Lotta Svärd became the largest women's organisation in Finland, and remains the largest voluntary association of Finnish women to date.

Luukkonen regarded her role as president as an extension of her vocation as a teacher. She held that Lotta Svärd was not only a defence organisation but also an ethical and pedagogical one, and she frequently taught and lectured its members and urged other leaders to see themselves as educators of the Lottas. The work of the pikkulotat (Young Lottas), the organisation's section for girls, in which upbringing played a central role, was particularly close to her heart.

== Second World War: the Winter War and the Continuation War ==
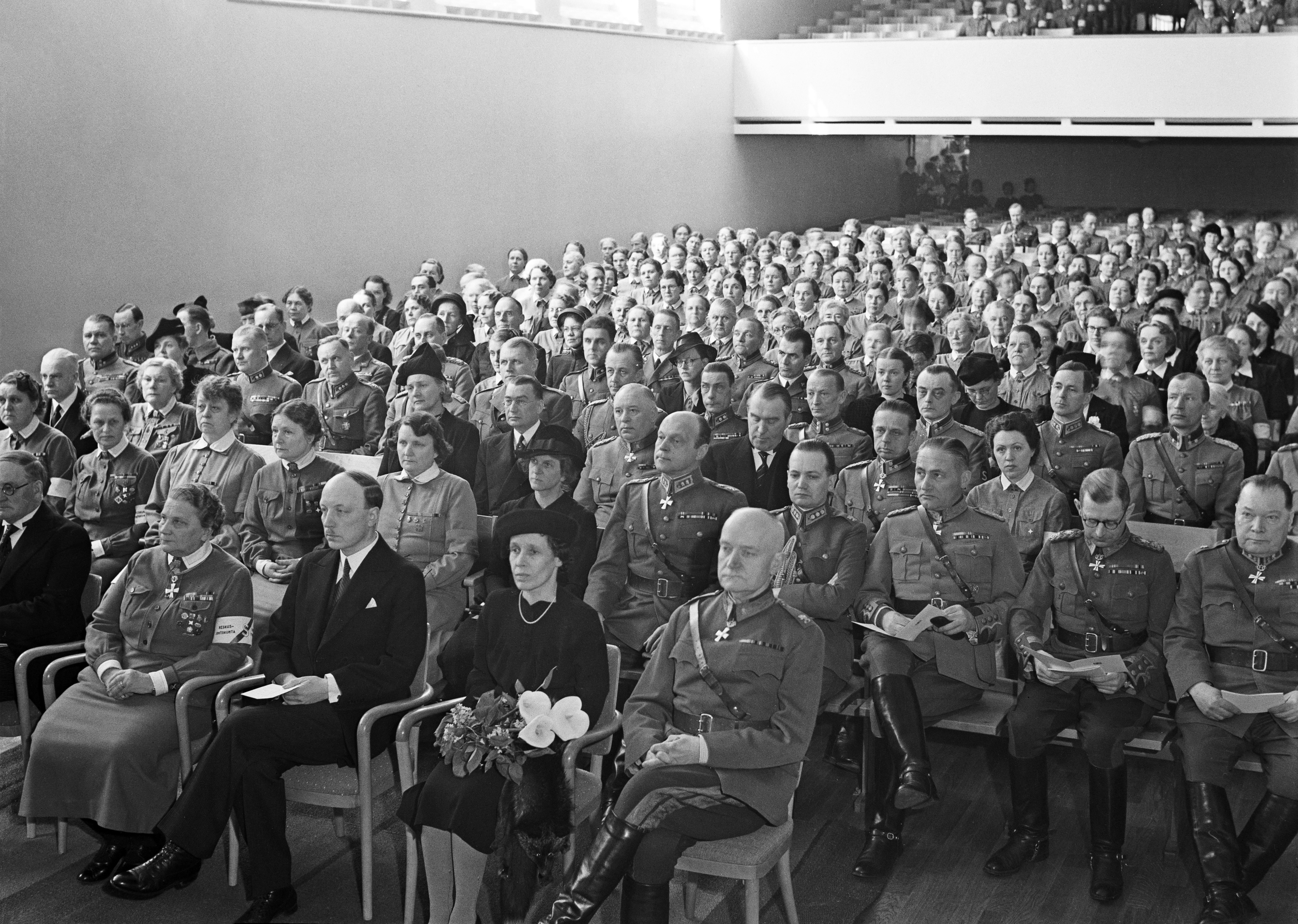
Celebration of 20 years of the Lotta Svärd Organisation, 27 February 1941. Fanni Luukkonen and President Risto Ryti in front row, Helmi Arneberg-Pentti and Tyra Wadner directly behind in second row.

During the Second World War, around 90,000 Lottas served in the Finnish Defence Forces, and approximately 300 Lottas died during the wars.

The Winter War began when the Soviet Union invaded Finland on 30 November 1939, three months after the outbreak of World War II. It ended with the Moscow Peace Treaty on 13 March 1940, after heavy Soviet losses but with Finland ceding 9% of its territory. After the Winter War, Lotta training was intensified in response to the organisational shortcomings the war had revealed. Luukkonen took part in courses held at the Lotta Svärd institute in Tuusula, near the Civil Guard officers' school. At one such course in June 1940, Marshal Mannerheim presented Luukkonen with the Order of the Cross of Liberty, 1st Class with swords. She was the first woman ever to receive this decoration, and it was awarded on a red (wartime) ribbon, worn around the neck as soldiers did. The only other woman to have received it is Elisabeth Rehn, a former minister and UN delegate, who was awarded it in 2002 for her peacetime work.

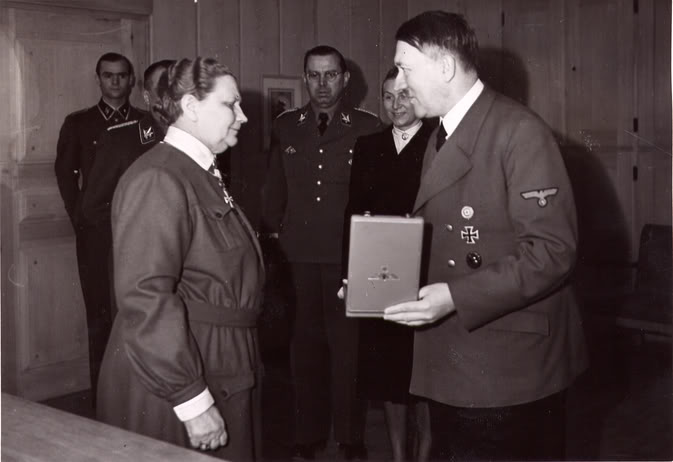
Fanni Luukkonen was awarded the Order of the German Eagle with Star from Adolf Hitler on 19 May 1943

There was 15 months of Interim Peace in Finland during which the government gradually moved closer to Germany in order to fend off perceived Soviet aggression and Soviet interference in Finnish domestic politics. Finland later perceived co-operation with Germany as offering the potential to reclaim areas ceded to the Soviet Union during the Winter War. Two days after the beginning of Nazi Germany's Operation Barbarossa in June 1941, Soviet–Finnish hostilities resumed with the start of the Continuation War between Finland and the Soviet Union.

Again, the Lottas stepped up to support the armed forces in auxiliary roles. Luukkonen travelled the country from Lapland to the Karelian Isthmus, and across the former border into East Karelia, including Viena Karelia and Olonets Karelia, areas occupied by Finland during the war. She sometimes hosted foreign visitors interested in Lotta Svärd's activities under front-line conditions. She gave lectures and talks, in Finland and abroad, on the history and activities of the Lottas, and built relationships with other Scandinavian and Baltic Lotta organisations. Maja Schmidt, the leader of the Swedish Lotta organisation, considered the Finnish Lottas a model not only for Sweden but for the rest of Scandinavia and the Baltic states. The Finnish Lotta organisation was also well regarded in Germany, and on 19 May 1943 Luukkonen visited the headquarters of Nazi German dictator Adolf Hitler, where she received the Order of the German Eagle with Star for her role in "the fight against Bolshevism". She was the only non-German woman to be awarded this decoration.

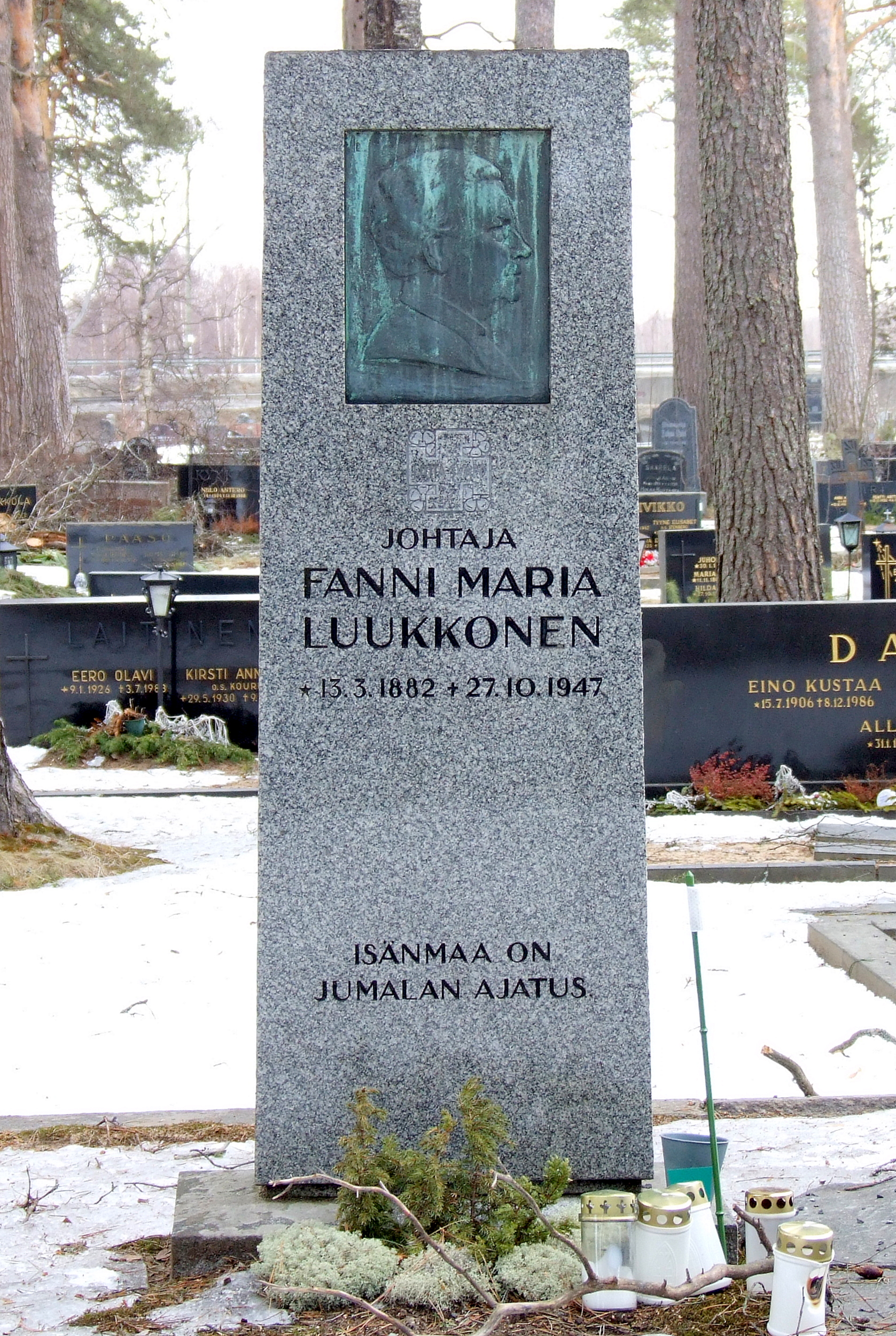
Fanni Luukkonen's Gravestone

== Post war ==
The terms of the peace agreement with the Soviet Union at the end of the 1941–1944 Continuation War included the abolition of the Lotta Svärd organisation and the White Guard.

After the end of the Continuation War and the dissolution of Lotta Svärd, Luukkonen was awarded the Order of the Cross of Liberty, 1st Class with grand star – the highest decoration ever granted to a woman in Finland. The end of Lotta Svärd meant a major life change for Luukkonen: she lived in Helsinki on a small pension and did occasional translation work. After the war she was insulted and received anonymous letters of slander for her previous role, which was branded anti-Soviet. The mental pressure of the period worsened her already poor health. She was considered persona non grata and may have been kept under surveillance, with travel to the Nordic countries made difficult.

Fanni Luukkonen died of a heart attack on 27 October 1947 in Helsinki, age 65. She was buried in the family grave at Kruununsaari cemetery in Ii. The stone on her grave bears the Lotta Svärd emblem and the inscription Isänmaa on Jumalan ajatus ("The Fatherland is God's idea").

== Legacy and commemoration ==
There is a plaque commemorating Fanni Luukkonen at Tehtaankatu 21 in Helsinki, and another plaque at Heinätori School in Oulu.

In the 2004 Suuret Suomalaiset (Greatest Finns) poll, modelled on the 100 Greatest Britons, Fanni Luukkonen was voted 44th.

A documentary film Sotalotta, by Raimo Salo, has been made about the life of Fanni Luukkonen, the leader of the Lottas. Interviews in the film revealed how difficult it was for Luukkonen to disband the organisation and how the Lottas felt that their leader was treated harshly.

The 2009 play Siniväriset, written by Okko Leo, Kati Kaartinen and Outi Nyytäjä, is based on the life of Luukkonen.
