= Gustaf Gabriel Hällström =

Finnish scientist (1775–1844)

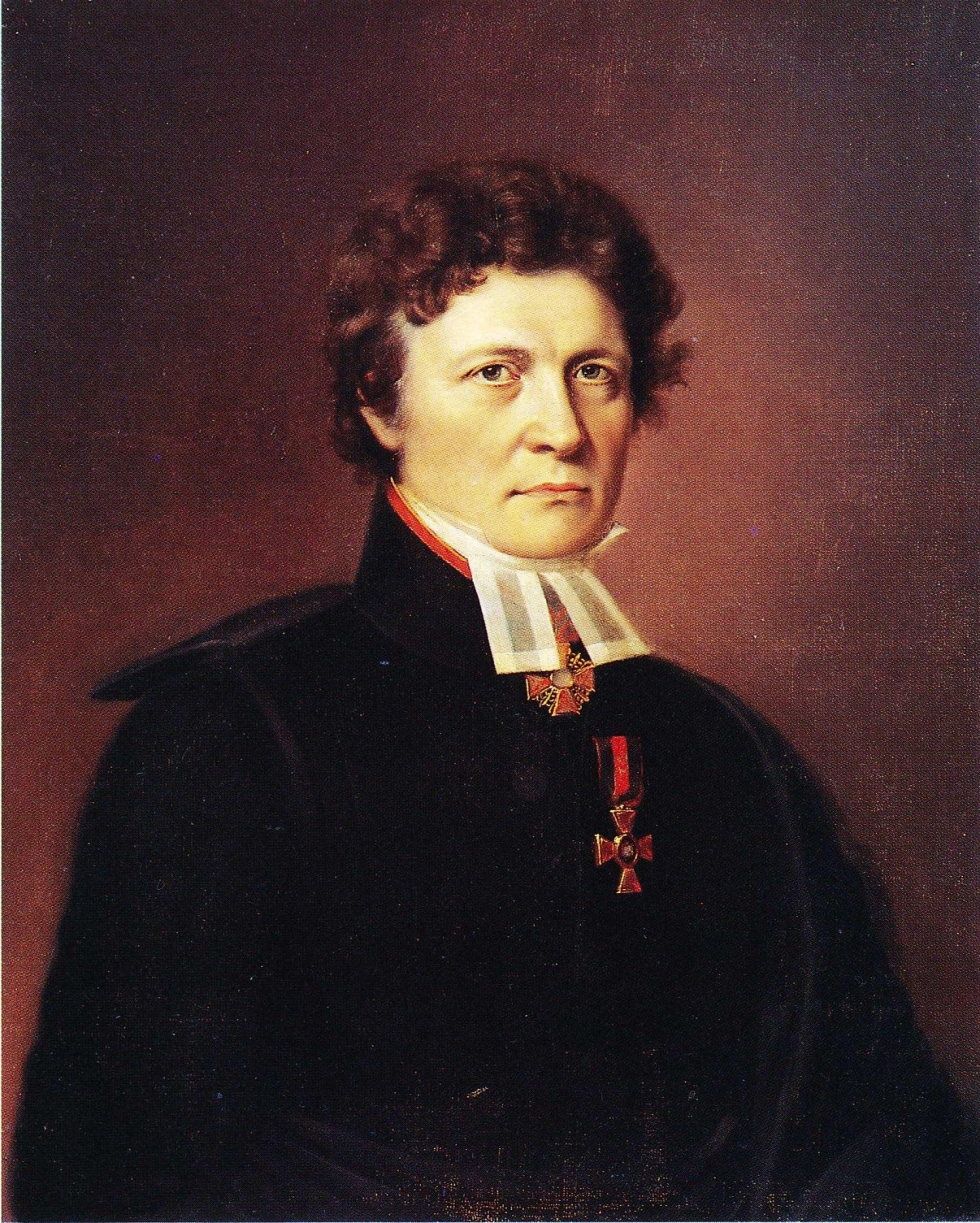
Portrait of Gustaf Gabriel Hällström by Johan Erik Lindh, c. 1830

Gustaf Gabriel Hällström (25 November 1775 – 2 June 1844) was a Finnish scientist. He was active in several fields, contributing to the establishment of an astronomical observatory in Turku as well as initiating the earliest systematic meteorological observations in Finland. His children were ennobled in recognition of his achievements.

== Biography ==
Gustaf Gabriel Hällström was born in Ilmajoki, Finland on 25 November 1775. He entered the Royal Academy of Turku as a student in 1792 and made a rapid career as an academic. He would remain tied to the academy throughout his life, also after it moved to Helsinki in 1827, becoming president of the university (today known as Helsinki University) for several years. He was made a professor of physics already in 1801, after having abandoned his initial studies in mathematics. He published his research widely, mainly in the form of dissertations and in Vetenskapsakademiens Handlingar, the scientific journal of the Royal Swedish Academy of Sciences, as well as in the journal of the Finnish Society of Sciences and Letters, but also in foreign publications. His interests ranged from thermodynamics to acoustics and meteorology; "his dissertations in physics covered almost all the areas of the field of physics at that time." In addition, he was ordained as a priest in 1804 and received a doctorate in theology in 1826; he was the last professor of physics at the Royal Academy of Turku to be ordained as a priest in order to augment his salary (as priests had a certain level of guaranteed income).

As a person, he has been described as "naturally conservative" and, especially in his later years, received criticism for being too cautious as an academic. He was respected as a scientist and in 1830 his children were ennobled and subsequently had their surnames changed to af Hällström in recognition of their father's achievements.

The minor planet 2640 Hällström is named after him.

== Work ==
=== Physics and astronomy ===
In physics, Hällström's research spanned several areas. In 1805, he was awarded a prize by the Royal Swedish Academy of Sciences for a thesis concerning the expansion of iron at different temperatures. Hällström managed to show that the relationship between the temperature of the metal and its degree of expansion was not a linear one. Another problem which he returned to frequently during his career was that of the effects of heat on water and the question of at what temperature water has the highest density; he was again awarded a prize in 1823 for a study in this field, supported by meticulous experiments. Within the field of acoustics, Hällström made research on combination tones, with the help of experiments carried out on the organ of Turku Cathedral.

Hällström was instrumental in creating a rudimentary observatory in Turku and to engage initially Henrik Johan Walbeck and later Friedrich Wilhelm Argelander as astronomers there. He also made astronomical observations himself.

=== Meteorology ===
Gustaf Gabriel Hällström took the initiative to make the first meteorological observations in Finland. An early dissertation, published in 1804, concerned the phenomenon of night frost and was awarded a prize by an agricultural society (as this kind of research had important practical consequences for the agriculture in Finland). The systematic meteorological observations he had initiated yielded further subjects for his research, which also included studies of aurorae, the forming of ice on rivers and directions of prevailing winds in Finland.
