= Radio Syd =

Swedish pirate radio station

Malmö, Sweden (originally) Banjul, The Gambia (later); Sweden
- Broadcast area: Skåne, Sweden; later The Gambia and Senegal
- Frequencies: FM (Sweden); Medium Wave (The Gambia); Shortwave (briefly, 1984)
- Branding: Radio Syd

Programming
- Languages: Swedish (originally), English (later)
- Format: Pop music (originally)

Ownership
- Owner: Britt Wadner (from 1961)

History
- First air date: December 1958
- Last air date: September 2002
- Former call signs: Skånes Radio Mercur

Radio Syd ("Radio South") was a Swedish pirate radio station. It began life as Skånes Radio Mercur, the first "pirate radio" in Sweden, and started to broadcast in December 1958.

== History ==
The station was started by a young Swede, Nils-Eric Svensson, who had studied radio and television in the United States and had worked for a short period at the Swedish state run broadcasting company. "Skånes Radio Mercur" leased air time from the Danish pirate radio station Radio Mercur, that had started broadcasting a few months earlier from a Panama registered ship "Cheeta", anchored in international waters between Copenhagen, Denmark, and Malmö, Sweden. The broadcasts were on the FM band, and covered only the densely populated southwestern part of Sweden, Skåne, with the cities Malmö, Landskrona and Helsingborg.

In 1958, recorded music was limited to 60 minutes per day by Sveriges Radio, and pop music was represented by two or three recordings. The new radio station played only music, accenting pop music, and was an instant success, capturing 70 - 80% of the listeners during its limited broadcasting hours.

Skånes Radio Mercur was built on enthusiasm, without financial backing, and the start-up was difficult. To Nils-Eric's surprise, both the newspapers and the record companies boycotted the young station. The ad agencies were also slow to catch on, mostly because they were not equipped to handle this new media. Subsequently, the support came from small advertisers and small maverick record labels, which cashed in handsomely.

Nils-Eric Svensson stayed with his station for three years, until the Swedish Riksdag had introduced laws that made it impossible to continue the station as he saw it. He sold the station in 1961 to continue a career in the US, where he now lives in California. Britt Wadner, who was working in marketing on the station, took over. In 1962 Skånes Radio Mercur bought the transmission vessel Cheeta Mercur from Radio Mercur, and the name was changed to Radio Syd to differentiate it from the other Swedish radio pirate, Radio Nord, close to Stockholm.

Radio Syd continued to broadcast after the Riksdag had passed a bill against pirate radios in June 1962. In 1964, the station bought the larger vessel, Cheeta II from the former Radio Mercur, that ceased transmissions to Denmark in August 1962, because of a similar bill by the Danish Folketing. Radio Syd ceased transmissions to Sweden in 1966.

The second ship the mv Cheeta 2 broadcast the British station Caroline South for a few weeks after the mv Mi Amigo ran aground at Frinton. After this service ceased, the ship was sold and moved to the Gambia, where she eventually sank. Mrs. Wadner was jailed at least once for breaching Swedish broadcasting law.

Radio Syd was eventually set up in The Gambia just outside the capital Banjul. During the 1981 Gambian coup d'état attempt a Senegalese military helicopter was shot down trying to recapture the station from Gambian rebels, killing all 18 onboard. Broadcasting to The Gambia and Senegal on medium wave, the station ceased transmitting in September 2002 when the antennae collapsed. This site was subsequently used by a number of visiting Amateur Radio operators from the USA and Europe for so-called DX-pedition. At the end of January 2020, the building and all original equipment dating back to the 1960s were totally destroyed in a violent arson fire, which marks the end of Radio Syd. The owners relocated back to Sweden later same year.

In 1984 a short comeback - now on shortwave - was a grand success. Its MW programme was rebroadcast by GamTel, (formerly Cable & Wireless at facilities in Abuko), on shortwave reaching more than 1500 listeners around the world, from an idea by a Swedish Radio Club.

== Gallery ==
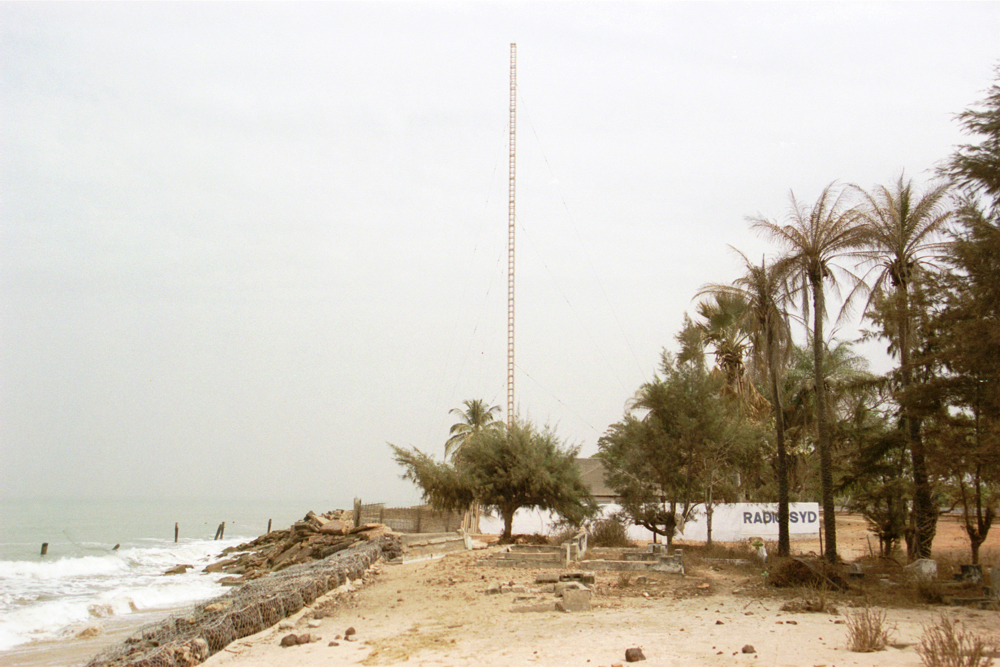
The building and the antenna mast intact - year 2000

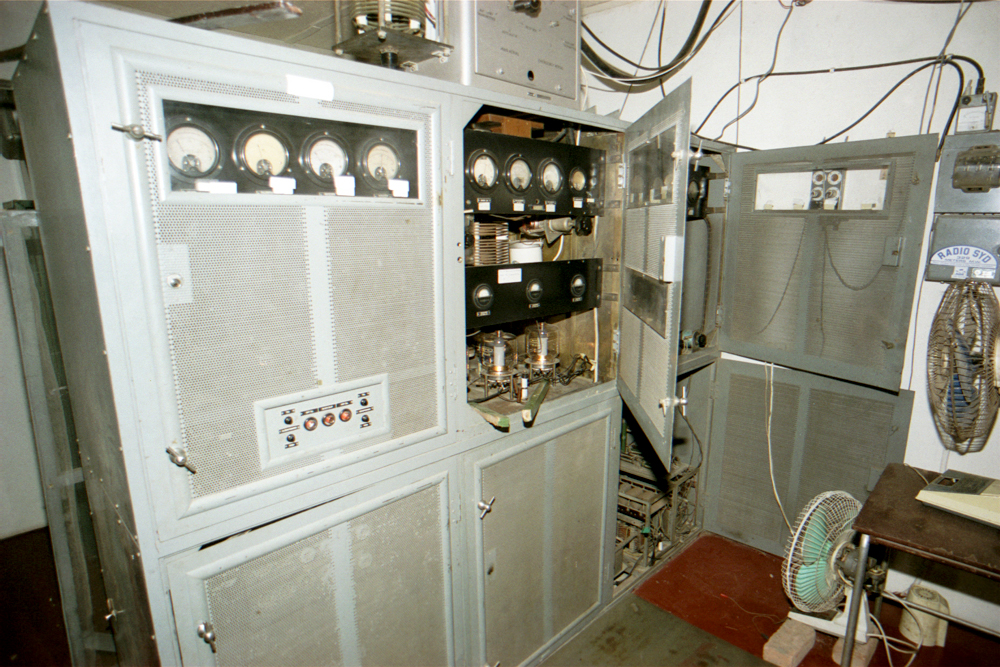
The medium-wave transmitter of Radio Syd - year 2000

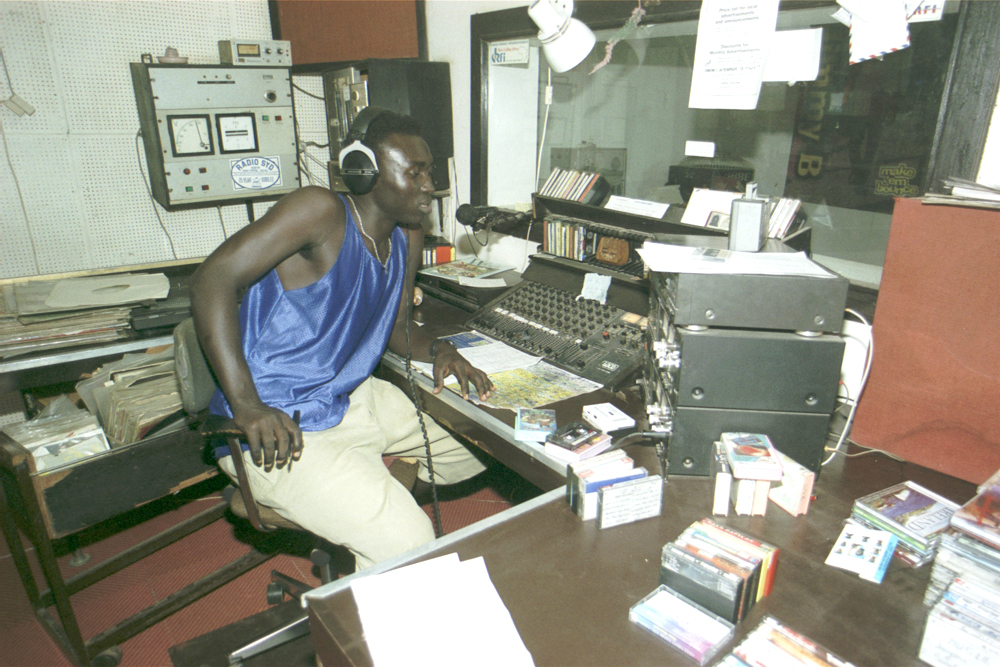
The radio studio with a local disc jockey playing vinyl records.

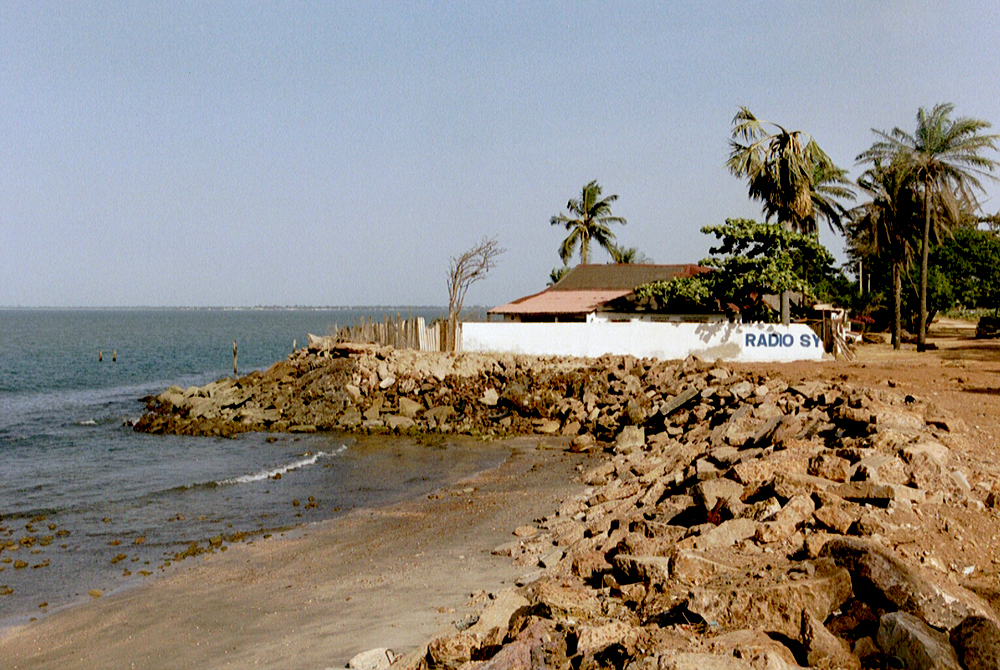
Coast erosion caused the collapse of the antenna mast on September 11, 2002.

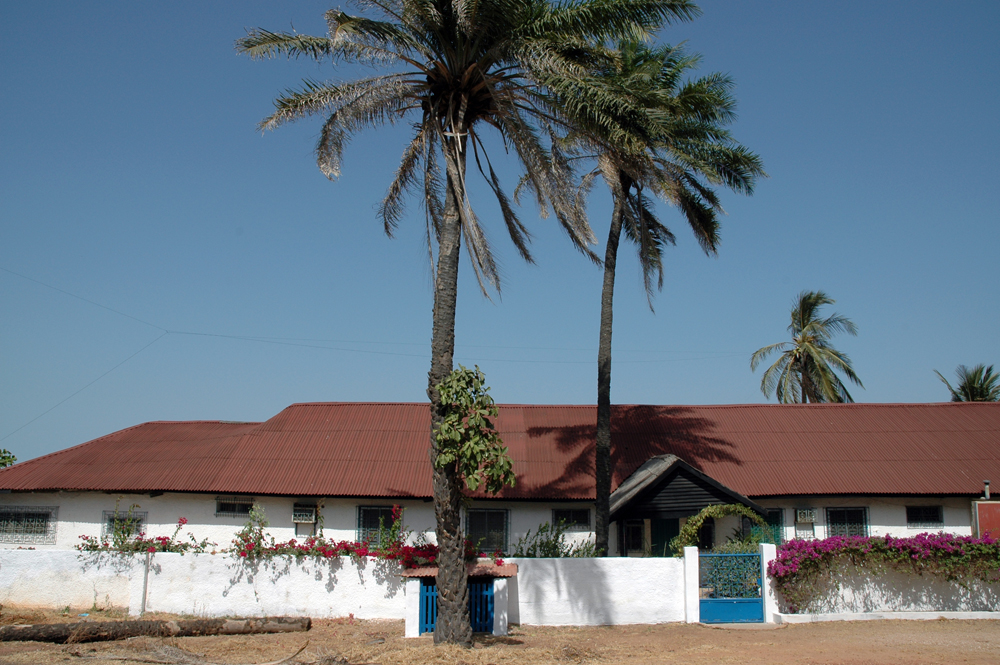
View from the main road to Banjul - year 2005.

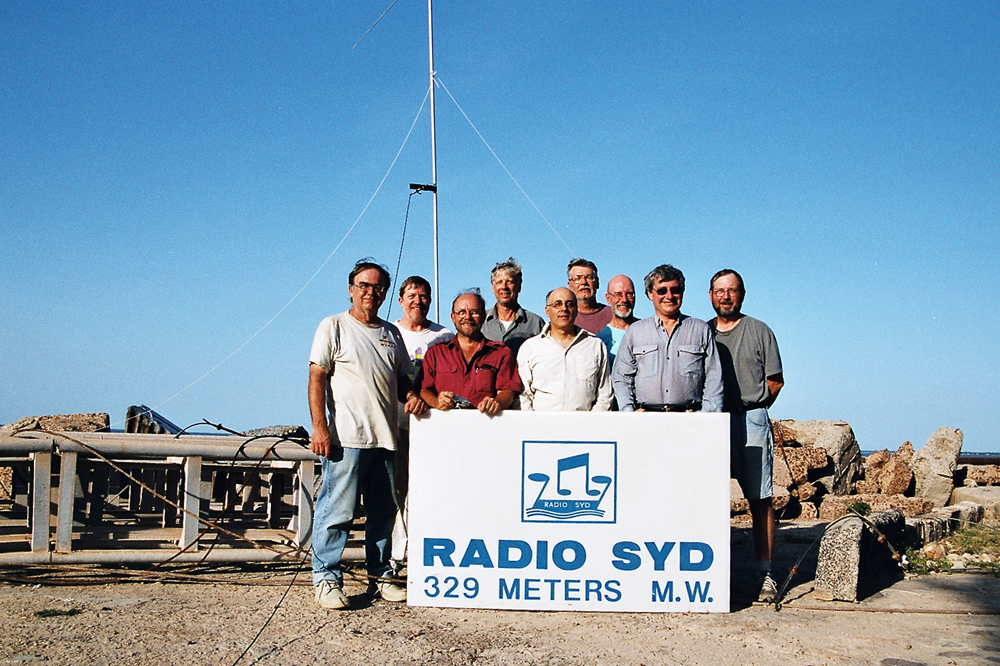
Amateur radio team participating in a contest from Radio Syd in October 2003.
