= Britt Wadner =

Swedish pirate radio manager

Britt Wadner (16 January 16, 1915 – 13 March 1987 Båstad) was a Swedish pirate radio manager.

== Early life ==
Britt Wadner was born on 16 January 1915 in Linköping to Tyra and Martin Wadner, the oldest of five daughters. Her family were well-off, her father was in the military, a second lieutenant in Första livgrenadjärregementet, when her parents married. Wadner grew up in Östermalm in Stockholm and attended the French school there. Her mother, Tyra Wadner, founded the 'lotta' Swedish Women's Voluntary Defence Organization movement in the 1920s. Wadner modelled the very first 'lotta' uniform, made for her by her mother, in the Swedish press. When Wadner was in her teens, her family relocated to Växjö, but she missed Stockholm, moving back at age 17 and working as an office clerk for Postgirot.

== Career ==
Britt Wadner was hired as an ad salesperson in 1959 for Skånes Radio Mercur, the first commercial "pirat" radio station in Sweden that Nils-Eric Svensson had started in December 1958. Svensson left management and sold his interest to Britt Wadner in 1961. She changed the name to Radio Syd in 1962, the same year the Pirate Radio Act (also called "Lex Radio Nord") was introduced in Sweden, which banned ownership of radio transmitters and also prohibited broadcasts from international waters if they disrupted Swedish Radio. She purchased the boat Cheeta I from the Danish Radio Mercur, and continued broadcasting violating the new law. Radio Syd continued broadcasting until 1966.

In 1966, she moved to the Gambia, where she was involved in radio and tourism and was also allowed to broadcast from land.

== Imprisonment ==
Wadner was sentenced three times for violation of the law, the last time being given three months in prison. The sentence was served at the Hinseberg women's prison.

== See also ==
- Pirate radio in Europe
