= Statue of Liberty (Finland) =

Bronze sculpture in Vaasa, Finland

Finnish Statue of Liberty
- Suomen Vapaudenpatsas
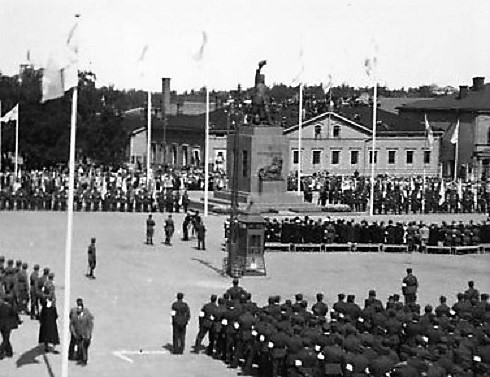
- Unveiling of Finland's Statue of Liberty in Vaasa on 9 July, 1938
- Interactive map of Finnish Statue of Liberty
- Location: Market Square, Vaasa, Ostrobothnia, Finland
- Coordinates: 63.09616°N 21.61566°E
- Designer: Yrjö Liipola; Jussi Mäntynen
- Type: Sculpture
- Material: Bronze
- Length: 11.5 m (38 ft)
- Width: 11.5 m (38 ft)
- Height: 14 m [46 ft] (incl. pedestal)
- Weight: 3.6 metric tons (4.0 short tons)
- Inauguration date: 9 July 1938; 87 years ago
- Dedicated to: White Guard (Finland)

The Statue of Liberty (Finnish: Suomen Vapaudenpatsas; Swedish: Finlands frihetsstaty) is a monumental bronze sculpture complex located in the Market Square of Vaasa in Ostrobothnia, Finland. The statue celebrates the victory of the Whites in the Finnish Civil War in 1918. The height of the work with its pedestals is 14 metres (46 ft) and the height of the part on top of the pedestal is 6 metres (20 ft). The sculpture weighs 3.6 tonnes (4.0 tons). The sculpture was designed by Yrjö Liipola and Jussi Mäntynen, and it was unveiled in 1938.

== Sculpture ==
Viewed from the square, there are two reliefs on the right side of the pedestal on the Alatori side. To the left is Työ ("Work"), with a man with a grain sheaf in his right hand and a sickle in his left. On the right is Tulevaisuus ("Future"), which depicts a mother and two children. The reliefs on the upper market side feature Laki ("Law"), which depicts a man with a sword and shield in his hands, and Uskonto ("Religion"), which features a woman who has turned her face toward the church. The relief on the back of the pedestal depicts Marshal C.G.E. Mannerheim dressed in a long-sleeved military jacket. He has a binoculars in his right hand. Behind Mannerheim, soldiers are marching and in the background is the wheel of a cannon's lavender.

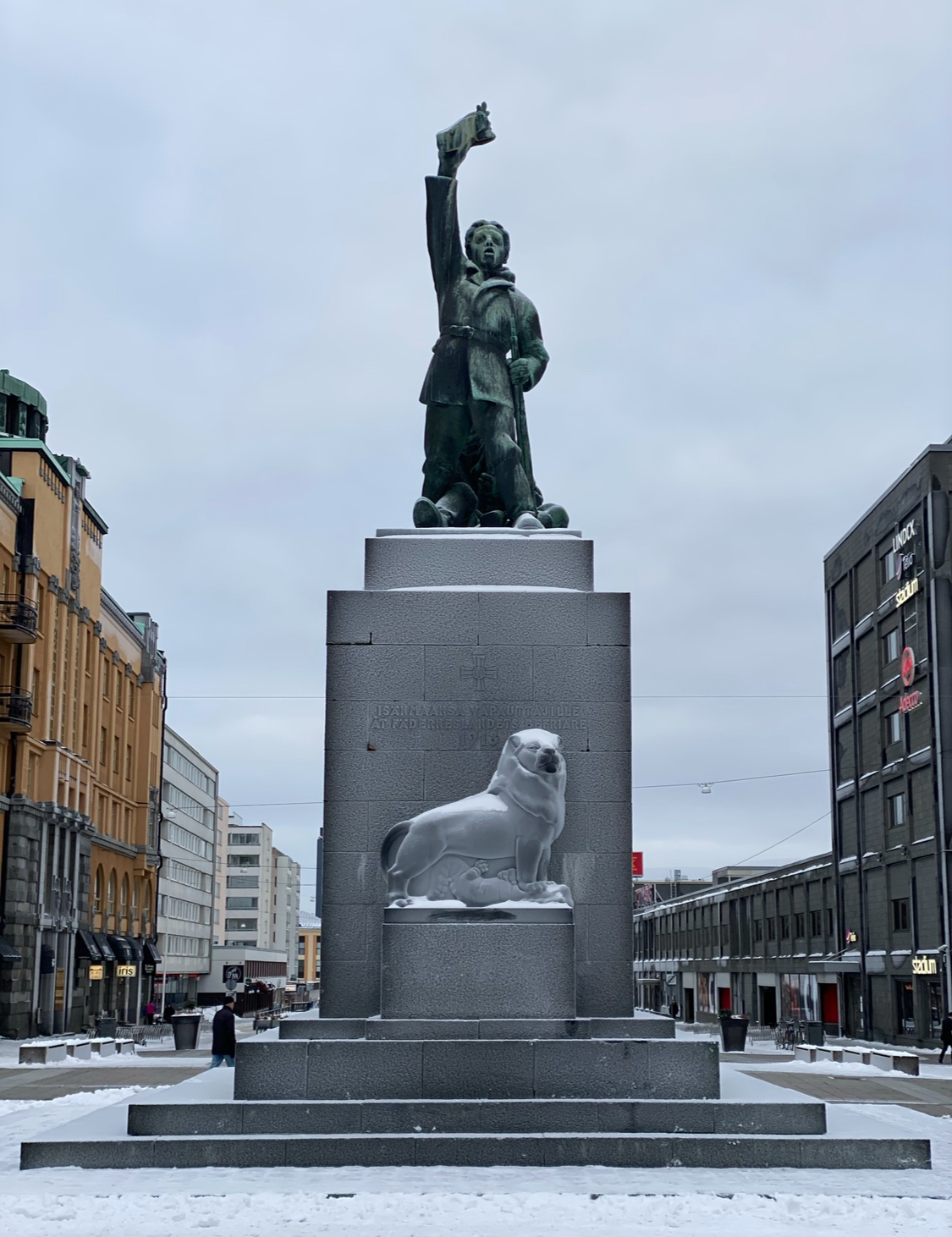
Statue of Liberty during winter.

In front of the pedestal is a stylized Finnish Lion, standing with its forelegs perched on the chest of a dragon which lies beneath it on the ground. Above the lion are the letters in both Finnish and Swedish: "FOR THE LIBERATORS OF COUNTRY, 1918". Above the text is the Cross of Liberty carved on a pedestal.

On top of the pedestal is a standing man in military uniform with his right hand raised. He is wearing a military hat with a hexagonal cockade. The man's left hand squeezes the rifle while the man's mouth is open. Behind him is a seated man holding his chest with his left hand while turning his face up to the right.

== History ==
The idea for the Finnish Statue of Liberty was born during the Civil War in Seinäjoki. General Mannerheim appointed the idea to implement a three-member committee with adjutant Akseli Gallen-Kallela. A committee was appointed to prepare the statue in the summer of 1918, which also included important business and civil servants from Vaasa. The committee is chaired by E. J. Ollonqvist, Commercial Counselor of Vaasa, and Erik Hartman, Consul, and Gösta Serlachius, Mänttä's vuorineuvos. Funds were raised from all over the country. However, most of the money came from Ostrobothnia and Vaasa. The project progressed slowly due to disagreements over its purpose and funding problems. The statue cost FIM 1,352,000, and the city of Vaasa paid for the stand and the party. The national sculpture competition, announced in 1935, involved 42 proposals. The original winning proposal was for the "son of Ostrobothnia to rush in", where a young man preparing to strike with a sword defends his wounded comrade.

=== Unveiling ceremony ===
The Statue of Liberty was unveiled on 9 July 1938. The unveiling ceremony was attended by, among others, President Kyösti Kallio and Marshal Mannerheim, as well as surviving members of the Svinhufvud's first senate during the Civil War. According to some estimates, more than 10,000 people had gathered at the Market Square. The celebration was paid for by the city of Vaasa.

== See also ==
- Equestrian statue of Marshal Mannerheim
- Finnish Civil War
