= Helmi Arneberg-Pentti =

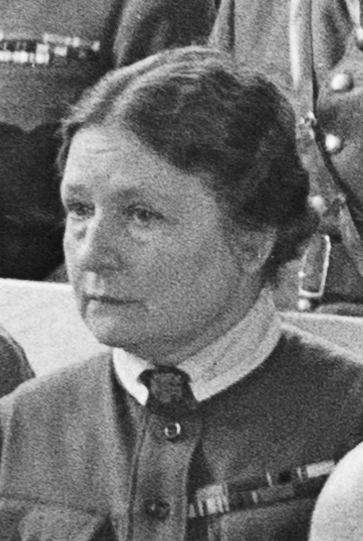
- Arneberg-Pentti in 1941
- Born: Helmi Arneberg; 13 August 1889; Kristiania (now Oslo), Norway
- Died: 22 January 1981 (aged 91); Helsinki
- Education: University of Helsinki
- Occupation: Teacher
- Known for: Chairman of Lotta Svärd, 1921-1922 and 1925-1929

Helmi Arneberg-Pentti (13 August 1889 - 22 January 1981) was the chairman of Lotta Svärd, the Finnish auxiliary organisation for women, from 1921 to 1922 and 1925 to 1929. She served the organisation until it was disbanded in 1944.

== Early life and education ==
Helmi Arneberg was born on 13 August 1889 in Kristiania (now Oslo), Norway to Lydia Matilda Lagus and Jonas Lund-Arneberg, a lawyer. In 1893, she moved to Finland at the age of four with her mother, who was returning to her homeland after the breakdown of her marriage. Arnberg graduated from the Vaasa fruntimmerskolan in 1907, then studied at the University of Helsinki, graduating with a degree in philosophy in 1916. She married fellow student S. J. Pentti the same year and became known as Helmi Arneberg-Pentti. She earned a Master of Philosophy degree in 1919.

== Career ==
From 1911 to 1916, Arneberg worked as an assistant in the library of the Student Union of the University of Helsinki. From 1917 she was a secretary of the State Household Committee, and then worked as a teacher of Finnish and Swedish in various schools. She taught Swedish at Helsinki V Yhteiskoulu school from 1933 and was also the school's head teacher from 1955 to 1957. It was unusual for a middle class mother to have a career at this time, but she taught for 40 years.

== Lotta Svärd and Marttaliitto ==
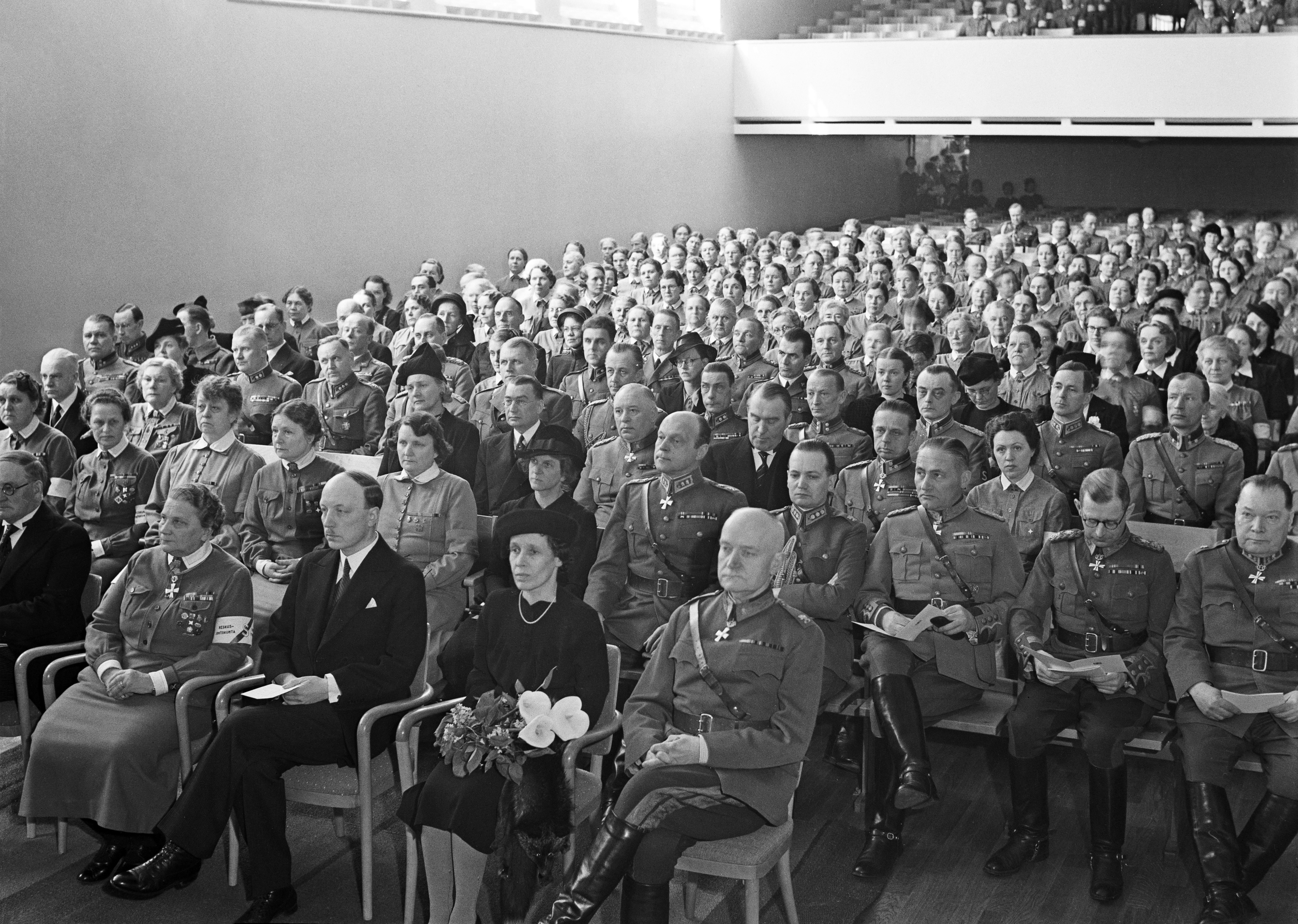
Celebration of 20 years of the Lotta Svärd Organisation, 27 February 1941. Helmi Arneberg-Pentti is sat in second row, fourth from left, behind Fanni Luukkonen and President Risto Ryti, to photo left of Tyra Wadner

From 1918 to 1921 Arneberg-Pentti was also vice-chairman and secretary of the Helsinki District of the Martha Organisation (Marttaliitto), a women's organisation which focused on home economics.

From 1920, she was chairman of the organising committee of the Lotta Svärd, a Finnish voluntary auxiliary organisation for women, joining it at its foundation. In 1920, the commander-in-chief of the Protectorate invited Arneberg-Pentti to chair a committee tasked with devising the statutes of the organisation, which remained the basis for the Lotta's activities until the war years. The statutes were amended only once, in 1925, and that work was also led by Arneberg-Pentti. The statutes played a decisive role in Lotta Svärd's work. During the 1920s, the organisation was still in a formative stage, and there was friction between different interest groups about its aims and objectives, which led to internal problems. Arneberg-Pentti succeeded in organising a national Lotta organisation and ensuring that it ultimately ran smoothly. She was an organiser, rather than a polemicist, which has resulted in the impact of her work being underestimated or ignored. Between 1921-1922 and 1925–1929, Arneberg-Pentti was chairman of the main Lotta Svärd board. She was particularly effective working behind the scenes, but her skilful diplomatic leadership had made her a rallying figure. When Arneberg-Pentti had to resign the leadership of Lotta Svärd in 1929 for family reasons, her departure was felt as a heavy loss for the organisation.

She remained a member of the central board until the Lotta organisation was abolished in 1944. Arneberg-Pentti was an administrator and organiser, rather than an ideological leader in the Lotta Svärd. Her role was later overshadowed by that of her successor as chair, Fanni Luukkonen who built the Lottas into a much larger national organisation, particularly during the Second World War period.

Arneberg-Pentti returned to the central management of Lotta Svärd in 1936. During the war, she headed the central collection and supply section of the Home Front work of the Lottas.

The terms of the peace agreement with the Soviet Union at the end of the 1941-1944 Continuation War included the abolition of the Lotta Svärd organisation. Lotta Svärd was disbanded on 23 November 1944. However, a new organisation, Suomen Naisten Huoltosäätiö, was started and took over much of the old property. This organisation still exists by the name of Lotta Svärd Säätiö (Lotta Svärd Foundation).

The disbandment of the Lotta Svärd led to public condemnation of the organisation but after Luukkonen's death, Arnberg-Pentti remained one of the few former leaders of the organisation who defended the honour of the Lottas.

== Personal life ==
She had four children with her husband S. J. Pentti. Their first child died young, six months before Finland became independent and fell into civil war in 1918.

Helmi Arnberg-Pentti died in Helsinki on 22 January 1981.

Lotta Svärd's reputation was restored ten years later.
