= Tyra Wadner =

Swedish defence volunteer

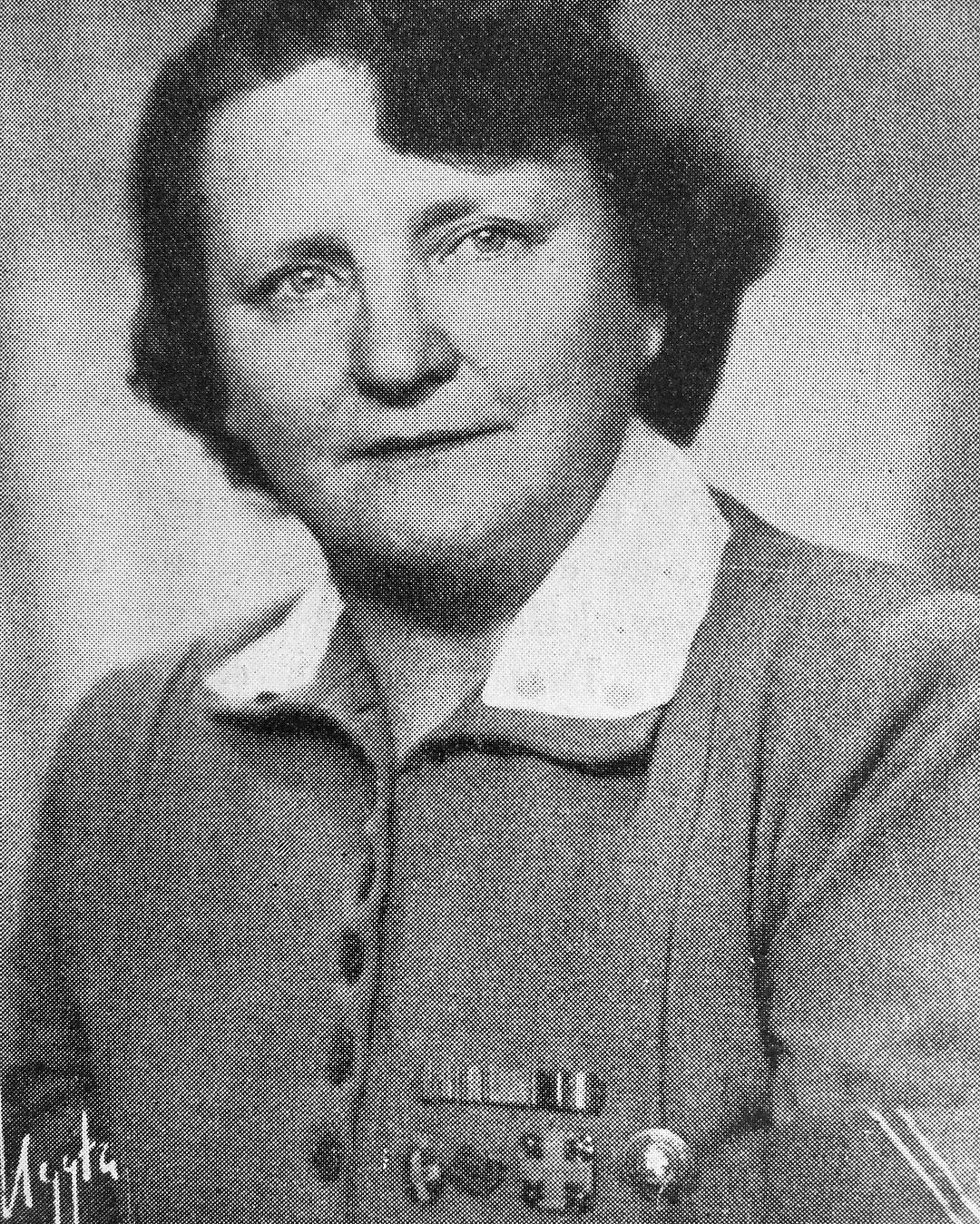
- Born: Tyra Elizabeth Nordquist; 7 June 1891; Brunskog, Värmland
- Died: 7 June 1967 (aged 76)
- Known for: Founder of the Swedish Women's Voluntary Defence Organization

Tyra Elisabet Wadner (7 June 1891 – 7 June 1967) was a Swedish defence volunteer who founded the Swedish Svenska Lottakåren (SLK), the Swedish Women's Voluntary Defence Organization.

== Early life ==
Tyra Elizabeth Nordquist was born in Brunskog, Värmland, on 7 June 1891 to August Nordquist and Mathilda (née Friberger). She was the youngest of their five children. Her father managed a factory but died before she was a year old. Following this tragedy, her family moved to Dalarna.

In 1914, Tyra Nordquist married the then Underlöjtnant Martin Wadner, who later became a colonel. The couple had five daughters, the eldest of whom was pirate radio pioneer Britt Wadner.

== Sverige Lottakårer ==
In the summer of 1924, Tyra Wadner travelled to Finland with her husband, then chief instructor at the Stockholm Swedish Landstorm Association, to study the country's Civil Guard, known as the White Guard (Finnish: Suojeluskunta, Swedish: Skyddskår). During this visit, Wadner came into contact with the Finnish Lotta Svärd, a voluntary auxiliary paramilitary organisation for women, formed in 1918 during the Finnish Civil War to support the White Guard. Led by Helmi Arneberg-Pentti then Fanni Luukkonen, it had a large membership undertaking volunteer social work in the 1920s and 1930s, and auxiliary support to the military during the Second World War period, particularly the Continuation War.

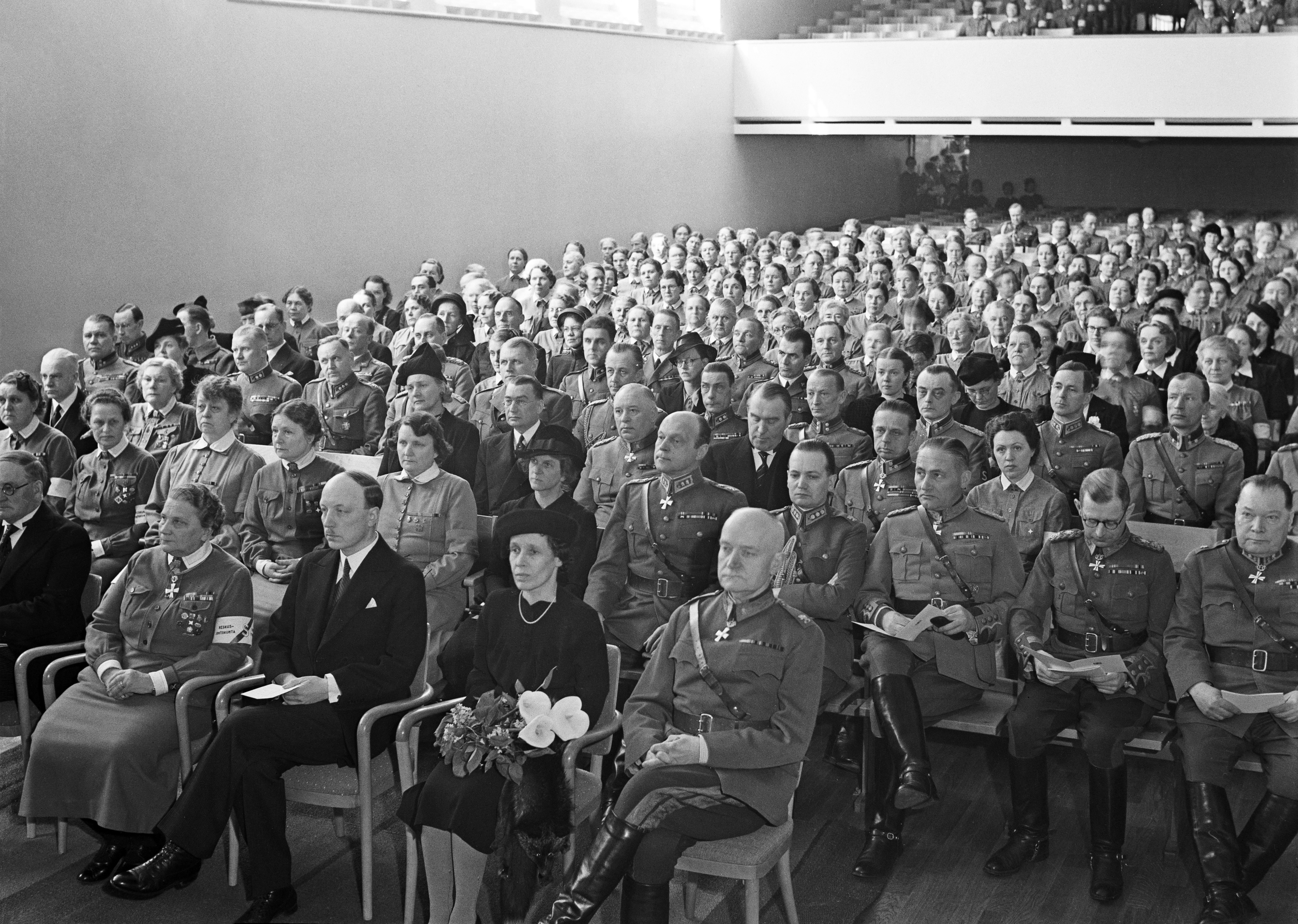
Wadner was an honoured guest at the 20 years celebration of the Lotta Svärd Organisation, in 27 February 1941. Sat in second row, fifth from left, behind Finnish President Risto Ryti.

Wadner was inspired to create a similar organisation in Stockholm on her return. The new organisation was named Stockholms landstormskvinnor and operated under the Stockholm Landstorm Association.

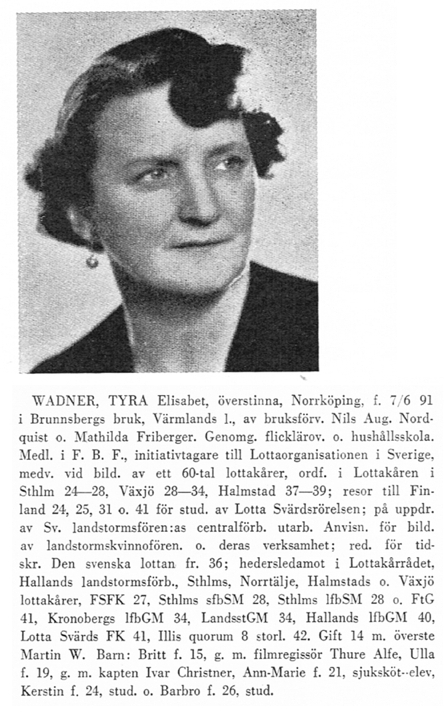
Tyra Wadner

The Stockholms Landstormskvinnor quickly gained sister organisations around the country. Wadner helped to start several of them. Collectively, they were known as the Landstormskvinnorörelsen, or Lotta Movement.

Wadner remained a leading figure in the Lotta movement until her resignation in 1942 when the Landstorm was abolished. The connected women's associations broke away and formed an independent organisation, the Sverige Lottakårer (Swedish Lotta Corps), the Swedish Women's Voluntary Defence Organization. At that time, the Lottarörelsen was one of the country's largest women's organisations ever. It continues to this day.

== Personal life ==
Tyra and Martin Wadner had five daughters, Britt Wadner (b. 1915), Ulla (b. 1919), Anne-Marie (b. 1921), Kerstin (b. 1924) Barbro (b. 1926).

Tyra Wadner died on her 76th birthday in 1967. She is buried in Säters cemetery in Dalarna. Her gravestone bears the inscription ‘Lottan Tyra Wadner 1891-1967.’

== Awards and decorations ==
- (Sweden) Illis quorum, 8th size (1942)
- (Sweden) Swedish Women's Voluntary Defence Organization Medal of Merit in gold
- (Sweden) Federation of Landstorm Associations Medal of Merit in gold and honorary shield in silver (Sveriges landstormsföreningars centralförbunds guldmedalj och hederssköld i silver och förtjänstmedalj)
- (Sweden) Stockholm Landstorm Association (Stockholms landstormsförbund) Silver Medal
- (Sweden) Stockholm Shooting Federation (Stockholms skytteförbund) Silver Medal
- (Sweden) Kronoberg Landstorm Association (Kronobergs landstormsförbund) Gold Medal
- (Sweden) Halland-Northwest Scania Landstorm Association (Halland-nordvästra Skånes landstormsförbund) Gold Medal
