= Lotta Svärd (poem) =

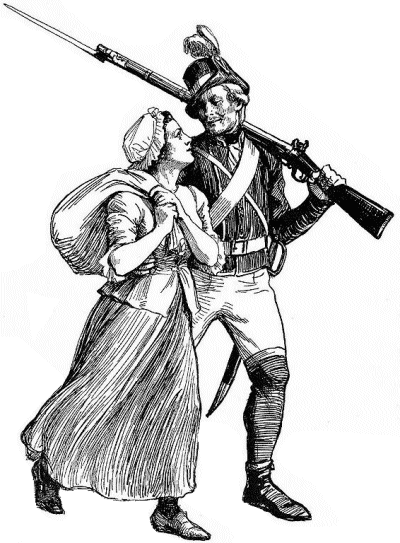
Illustration for the poem "Lotta Svärd"

"Lotta Svärd" – Swedish: svärd means a sword – is the fourth poem in the second part of Johan Ludvig Runeberg's epic poem The Tales of Ensign Stål from 1860.

The "Lotta Svärd" poem is about a woman who manned a field kitchen during the Finnish War. The name was later used for several Lotta movements (women's auxiliary movements) in the Nordic countries (Finland, Sweden, Denmark, and Norway).

"Lottas" refers to the volunteer women who participated in the national defence in a variety of roles.

German playwright Bertolt Brecht modelled his character of Mother Courage partially on Lotta Svärd in his 1939 play Mutter Courage und ihre Kinder (Mother Courage and Her Children), written while he was in exile from Nazi Germany in Sweden.

== See also ==
- The poem Lotta Svärd in Wikisource
- Lotta Svärd – Finnish voluntary auxiliary paramilitary organisation for women.
- Swedish Women's Voluntary Defence Organization ("Lottorna")
