= Wadner, Buldhana =

Village in Maharashtra

Wadner Bholji
- village
- Location in Maharashtra, India Wadner Bholji (India)
- Coordinates: 20°50′59″N 76°20′0″E
- Country: India
- State: Maharashtra
- District: Buldhana
- Elevation: 259 m (850 ft)

Languages
  - Official: Marathi
- Time zone: UTC+5:30 (IST)
- Postal code: 443101
- Vehicle registration: MH-28

Wadner Bholji is a village located in the Nandura tehsil of Buldhana district in Amravati division of Vidarbha region of Maharashtra state in India.

As of 2011 India census, Wadner had a population of 10445.

It is located on National Highway No. 6 running between Nagpur Mumbai.
