= Af Hällström =

Finnish noble family

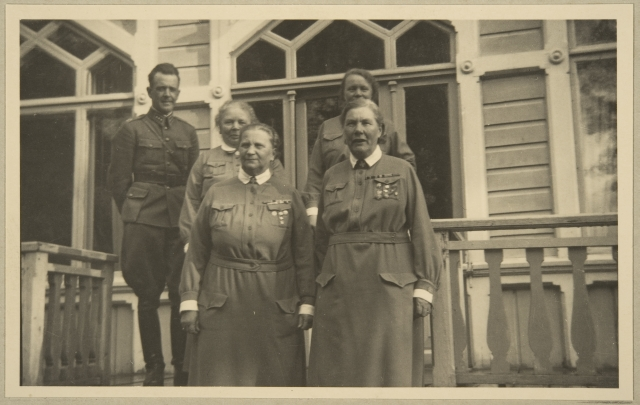
Souma Helena af Hällström, medical doctor, on the right

The Hällström family, also spelled af Hällström is a Finnish noble family.

== History ==
Its origins are in Helsingborg in Scania (then in Denmark, now in Sweden) in the 16th century. In 1724, Petter Hällström moved to Finland (then a part of Sweden), where he became the ancestor of a large family.

His grandson Gustaf Gabriel Hällström (1775–1844) was a Lutheran pastor, a physicist and rector of what is now the University of Helsinki. In 1830, his sons were ennobled for their father's accomplishments with the name af Hällström by the Grand Duke of Finland (and Tsar of Russia) Alexander II.

== Notable members ==
- Eliel af Hällström (1865–1950), vicar and rural dean, grandson of G. G. Hällström
- Erik af Hällström (1897–1951), professor of law, son of Eliel af Hällström
- Raoul af Hällström (1899–1975), movie critic, great grandson of G. G. Hällström
- Roland af Hällström (1905–1956), movie director, brother of Raoul af Hällström
- Gunnar af Hällström (1908–1964), professor of mathematics, great grandson of G. G. Hällström
- Olof af Hällström (1916–1990), intendant of Suomenlinna, son of Eliel af Hällström
- Harald af Hällström (1923–2003), member of the Supreme Court, brother of Olof af Hällström
- Gunnar af Hällström (born 1950), professor of theology, son of Harald af Hällström
- Arto af Hällström (born 1952), theater director, son of Roland af Hällström
