= Lotta Svärd =

Finnish auxiliary paramilitary organisation for women (1918–1940s)

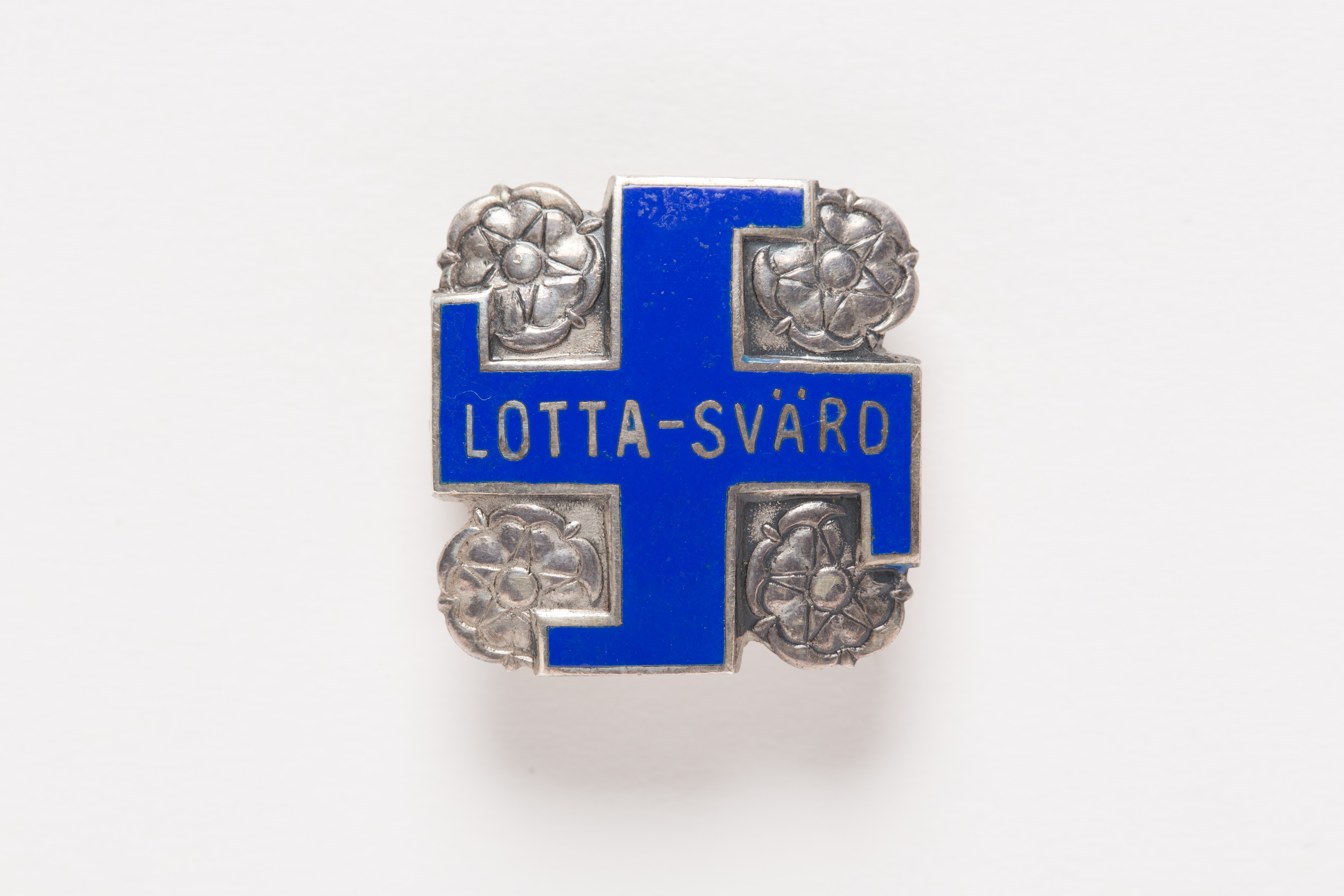
- Badge of the Lotta Svärd
- Active: 16 May 1918 (Note: Originally founded as part of the White Guard. It became a separate organization on 9 September 1920)–23 November 1944
- Country: Finland
- Branch: White Guard (1918-1920)
- Type: Auxiliary Paramilitary organization
- Role: Emergency medicine Anti-aircraft defense Air raid warning
- Size: 60,000 (1930); 242,000 (1944)
- Nickname: "Lottas"
- Patron: Lotta Svärd poem
- Engagements: Finnish Civil War; World War II

Commanders
- Notable commanders: Fanni Luukkonen (1929-1944)

Lotta Svärd (Finland Swedish: [ˈlotːɑ ˈsvæːrd]) was a Finnish voluntary auxiliary paramilitary organisation for women. The women were called lotat (sing. lotta, lit. 'Lottas') in Finnish. Formed originally in 1918, it had a large membership undertaking volunteer social work in the 1920s and 1930s. It was formed to support the White Guard. During the Second World War, it mobilized to replace men conscripted into the army. It served in hospitals, at air raid warning positions, and other auxiliary tasks in close cooperation with the army. The women were officially unarmed except for an antiaircraft battery in 1944. Virtanen argues that, their "accountability to the nation took a masculine and military form in public, but had a private, feminine side to it including features like caring, helping and loving." The organisation was disbanded by the government after the war.

== Name ==
The name comes from a poem by Johan Ludvig Runeberg. Part of a large and famous book, The Tales of Ensign Stål, the poem described a fictional woman named Lotta Svärd. According to the poem, a Finnish soldier, private Svärd – Swedish: svärd means a sword – went to fight in the Finnish War and took his wife, Lotta, along with him. Private Svärd was killed in battle, but his wife remained on the battlefield, taking care of wounded soldiers. The name was first brought up by Marshal Mannerheim in a speech given on 16 May 1918.

== History ==
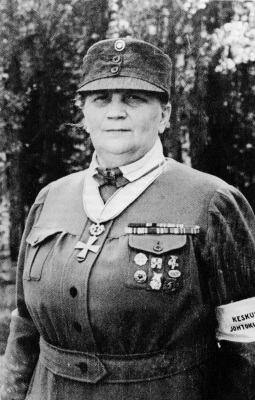
Fanni Luukkonen was the longtime leader of the Finnish Lotta Svärd

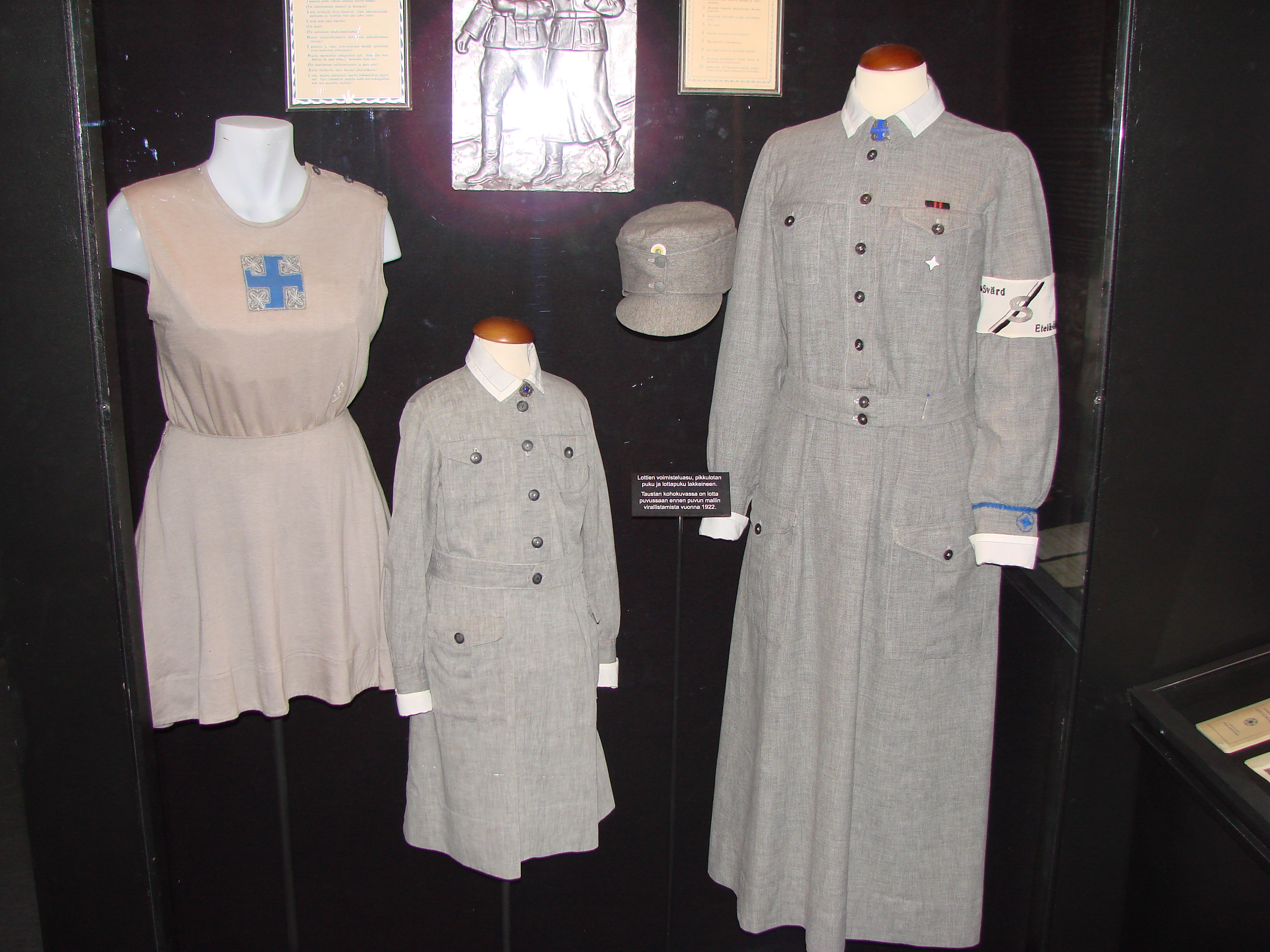
Lotta Svärd uniforms.

During the Finnish Civil War it was associated with the White Guard. After the war Lotta Svärd was founded as a separate organisation on 9 September 1920. The first known organisation to use the name Lotta Svärd was the Lotta Svärd of Riihimäki, founded on 11 November 1918.

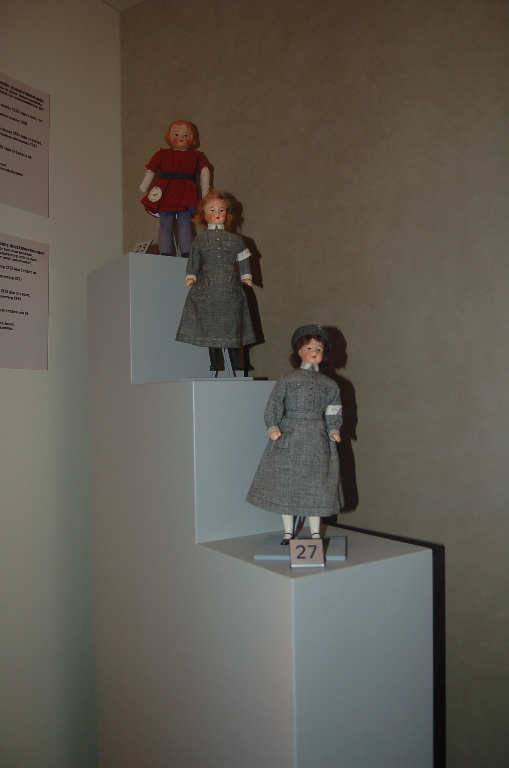
Wartime dolls dressed as Lottas.

The organisation expanded during the 1920s and it included 60,000 members in 1930. Helmi Arneberg-Pentti was chairman of Lotta Svärd from 1921 to 1922 and 1925 to 1929. By 1944 it included 242,000 volunteers, the largest voluntary auxiliary organisation in the world, while the total population of Finland was less than four million. Fanni Luukkonen was the leader of Lotta Svärd from 1929 to 1944.

Inspired by the Finnish Lotta Svärd, a similar organisation was founded in Stockholm, Sweden in 1924 by Tyra Wadner. The organisation, which later took the name Sveriges lottakårer [the Swedish Lotta corps], kept close contact with its Finnish sister-organisation.

During the 1920s and 1930s only Christian Finnish citizens were eligible to join, and two references from persons considered reliable were required. The latter requirement was often ignored after the break of Winter War in 1939. Foreigners could be accepted by special permission. However, in 1940 the first Muslim and Jewish members were accepted, and the first non-denominational member in 1941.

== World War II ==
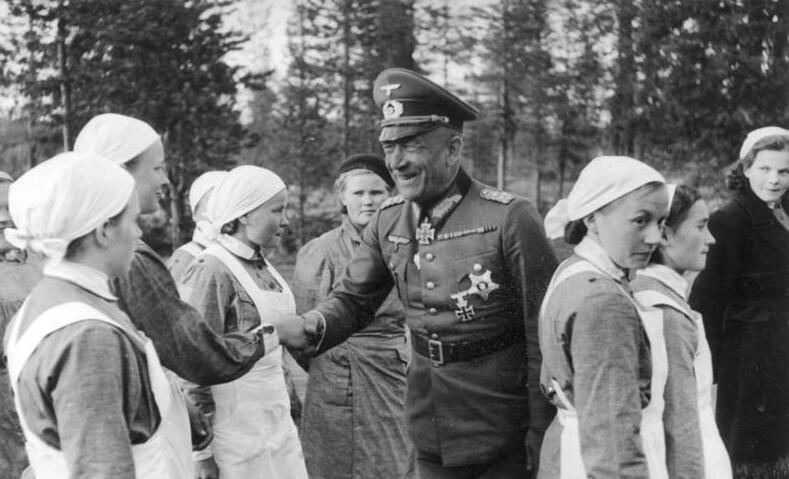
German Generaloberst von Falkenhorst with the sisters of the Lotta Svärd in the summer of 1941 during the Continuation War

During the Winter War some 100,000 men whose jobs were taken over by "Lottas" were freed for military service. The Lottas worked in hospitals, at air-raid warning posts and other auxiliary tasks in conjunction with the armed forces. The Lottas, however, were officially unarmed. The only exception was a voluntary anti-aircraft battery in Helsinki in summer 1944, composed of Lotta Svärd members. The battery operated the AA search-lights. The unit was issued rifles for self-protection, thus being the only armed female military unit of the Finnish Defence Forces history. The medical section was led by doctor Suoma af Hällström.

The dire need for labour led to fast recruitment and there was often no time to properly train the new Lottas according to the principles of the organisation. In addition, most new recruits were young and inexperienced. This caused some friction between the veterans and the new recruits.

Lotta Svärd suffered relatively light losses, considering the number of women posted to a war zone and the length of the war. During the wars 291 Lottas died, 140 from diseases caught on duty, 66 were killed on the front, 47 in air raids and 34 in accidents. The fallen Lottas were buried in war heroes' graves in their home parishes.

== Postwar ==
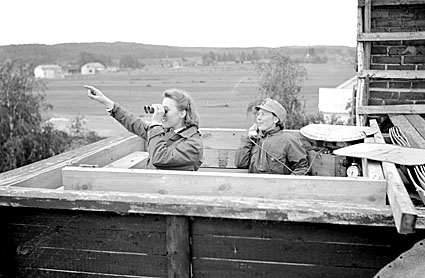
Lottas at an air raid warning post during the Second World War.

When the Continuation War (1941–1944) ended, the Soviet Union demanded the ban of all organisations that it considered to be paramilitary, fascist or semi-fascist. Lotta Svärd was one of the groups that was disbanded, on 23 November 1944. However, a new organisation, Suomen Naisten Huoltosäätiö, was started and took over much of the old property. The organisation still exists by the name of Lotta Svärd Säätiö (Lotta Svärd Foundation).

The Finnish Lotta Svärd organisation has inspired similar organisations in other countries and there is still a Lotta Svärd organisation in Sweden (the Swedish Women's Voluntary Defence Organization ("Lottorna"); the same model is also used in Denmark and Norway.

== Popular references ==
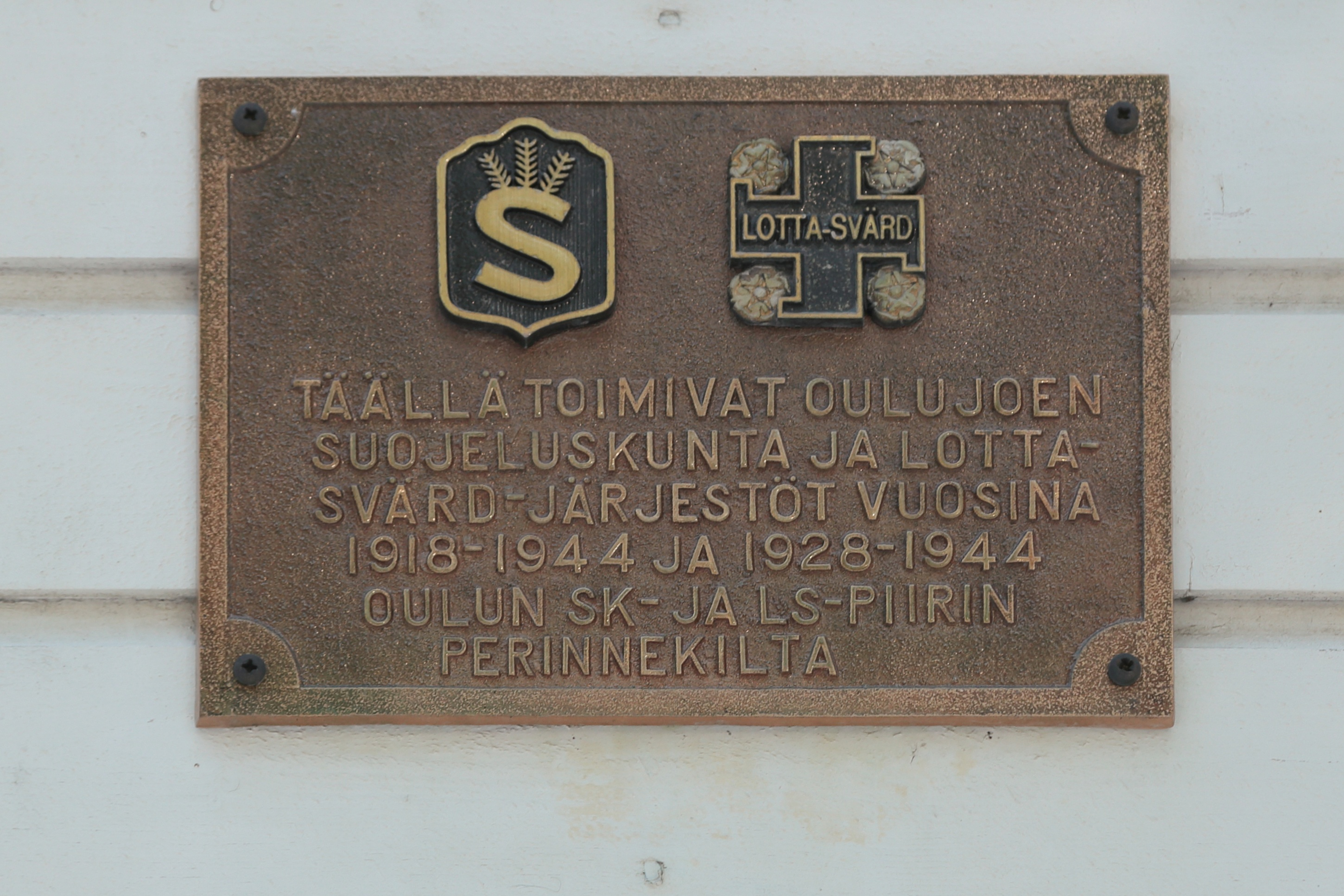
A memorial plaque on a building used by Lotta Svärd in Oulu.

The character of Tyyne Hurskainen (portrayed by Anja Pohjola) in the Finnish political satire series Hyvät herrat is a veteran Lotta, and can be seen drinking out of a coffee cup stamped with Lotta Svärd's logo in the show's animated title sequence.

The 2005 film Promise describes the experiences of Finnish Lottas during the Second World War.

The Finnish indie pop group Vasas flora och fauna released the album "Släkt med Lotta Svärd" in May 13, 2015.

A webcomic by Setz released April 23, 2017, "Lotta Svärd: Women of War" details the life of members of the Lotta Svärd during the Winter War, (1939-1940).

== See also ==
- Seinäjoki Civil Guard House, now housing the Civil Guard & Lotta Svärd Museum
