= Lottekorps =

Denmark's volunteer women's military auxiliary unit

The Danish Lottekorps was the volunteer women's auxiliary corps of Denmark from 1946 to 1989. It was similar in function to Finland's Lotta Svärd, the Swedish Women's Voluntary Defence Organization, Estonia's Naiskodukaitse, and Norway's Norges Lotteforbund.

In January 1944 the Danish Women's Aid Service was created in Stockholm, inspired by the Swedish Lotte Corps, and led by General Knudtzon. Its purpose was to take over sanitation, office work, field kitchens and the signals services normally performed by men in the Danish Landstorm (the precursor to the Home Guard) so that they could instead focus on combat duties as part of the Danish Brigade in Sweden. On 9 April 1946, the Lottekorps itself was formed, with many of its members being from the previous organization that served with the Brigade. It took its name from Johan Ludvig Runeberg's poem about the Lotta Svärd and was led by Mrs. Ingrid Dreyer from 1946 to 1950. On 22 June 1946 the Women's Auxiliary Marine Corps was created. The Lottes were incorporated into the Home Guard in 1951, and in 1953 a branch was formed for the Royal Danish Air Force. The Lottekorps was disbanded in 1989 when women were fully integrated into the Home Guard.
