= Swedish Women's Voluntary Defence Organization =

Independent auxiliary defence organization in Sweden

- Svenska Lottakåren; S·L·K; Riksförbundet Sveriges lottakårer
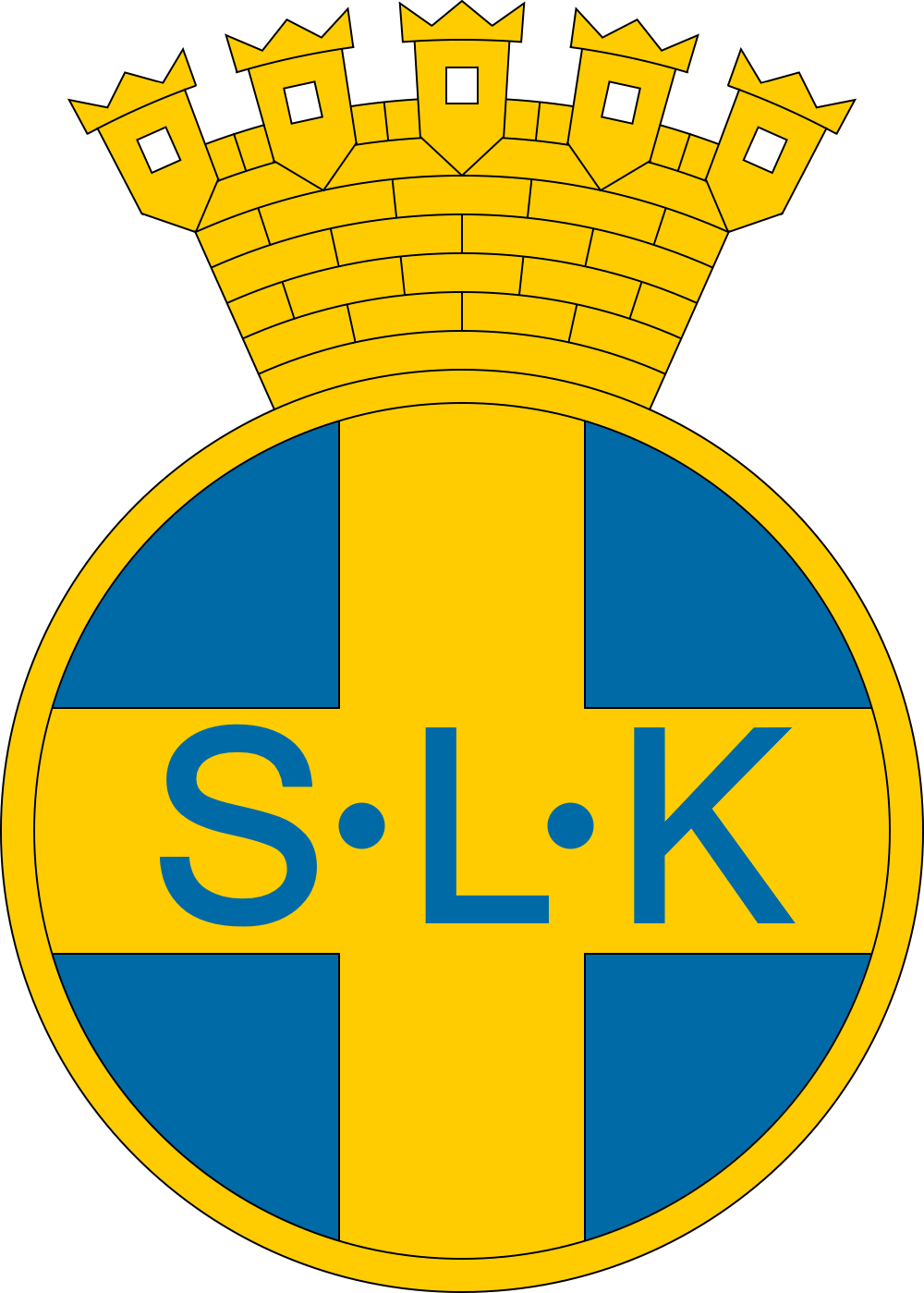
- Coat of arms of the Swedish Women's Voluntary Defence Organization
- Founded: 1924; 102 years ago
- Country: Sweden
- Size: 5,000
- Garrison/HQ: Stockholm

The Swedish Women's Voluntary Defence Organization (Note: Official English name according to their own website.) (Swedish: Svenska Lottakåren (SLK) communicatively, lit. 'The Swedish Lotta Corps', and Riksförbundet Sveriges lottakårer juridically, lit. 'national federation of Sweden's lotta corps' (Note: Also translated as the National Federation of Swedish Women’s Auxiliary Defence.)) is an independent auxiliary defence organization in Sweden. The organisation is part of the Swedish Total Defence (Totalförsvaret), the national defence strategy of Sweden.

The organisation was created in 1924 as a Swedish version of the Finnish equivalent organisation Lotta Svärd (created in 1918), which subsequently inspired other Scandinavian and the Baltic states to create their own organisations based on the same principles. These are collectively called "Lotta movements" as the majority of these organisations have adopted the name Lotta as the general designation for organisation members.

== Organisation ==
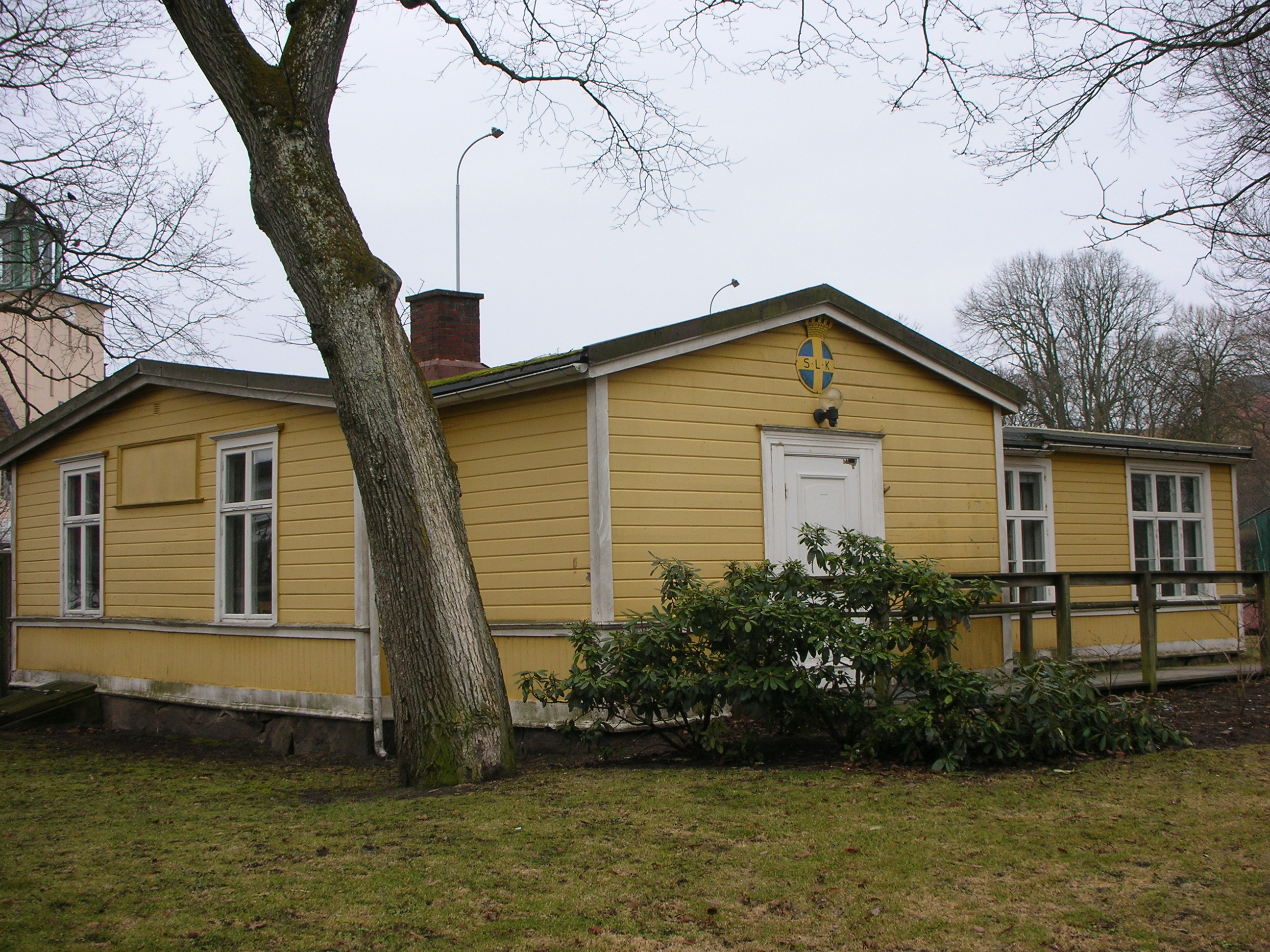
One of several "Lotta club houses", Swedish: Lottastugor (English: Lotta Cottages), in Sweden. The Lotta Cottage in the picture is located in the community park of Varberg Sweden. Notice the SLK emblem across the door.

The organization currently consists of approximately 5,000 women of all ages throughout Sweden. Svenska Lottakåren's purpose is to recruit and educate women for tasks in the Swedish total defence, and to conduct comprehensive defence training. Svenska Lottakåren works in both the Armed Forces and in Civilian Emergency Preparedness. The organization is politically neutral, and is one of the country's largest female networks.

Members are called lotta (singular) or lottor (plural).

== History ==
=== Origin ===
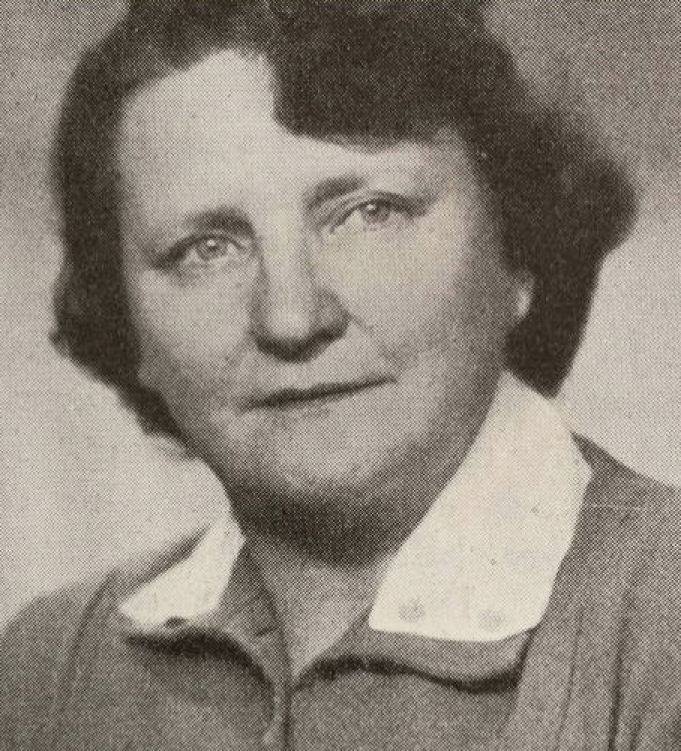
Founder of the SLK, Tyra Wadner.

Svenska Lottakåren was created in 1924 with the Finnish women's auxiliary organization, Lotta Svärd (founded in 1920), as a direct role model. The name Lotta comes from a poem by Johan Ludvig Runeberg, about a fictional woman named Lotta Svärd, who took care of wounded soldiers during the Finnish War.

The organisation was founded by a Swedish woman named Tyra Wadner, whom also became the organization's first chairperson, and was originally an auxiliary aid unit for the Swedish landstorm militia, then named Sveriges Landstormskvinnor (Sweden's Landstorm Women).

The organisation's original mission was non-militant and primarily aimed at collecting money for the landstorm militia. However, by the late 1930s it became apparent that the organisation was needed for militant missions during wartime, however not of combatant nature. In 1936 rules were laid down that regulated the organisation's activities in peacetime and wartime.

In peacetime, the activities would be concentrated in four areas:

- Collection of funds for the landstorm militia
- Provide service at landstorm militia exercises
- Training of their own members
- Information work to "raise the motherland and homeland patriotism feeling and strengthen the nation's defence".

During the war, Svenska Lottakåren instead had to undertake various forms of assistance for defence in the homeland, especially during mobilization. Members were divided into army, navy and airfields.

=== World War II ===
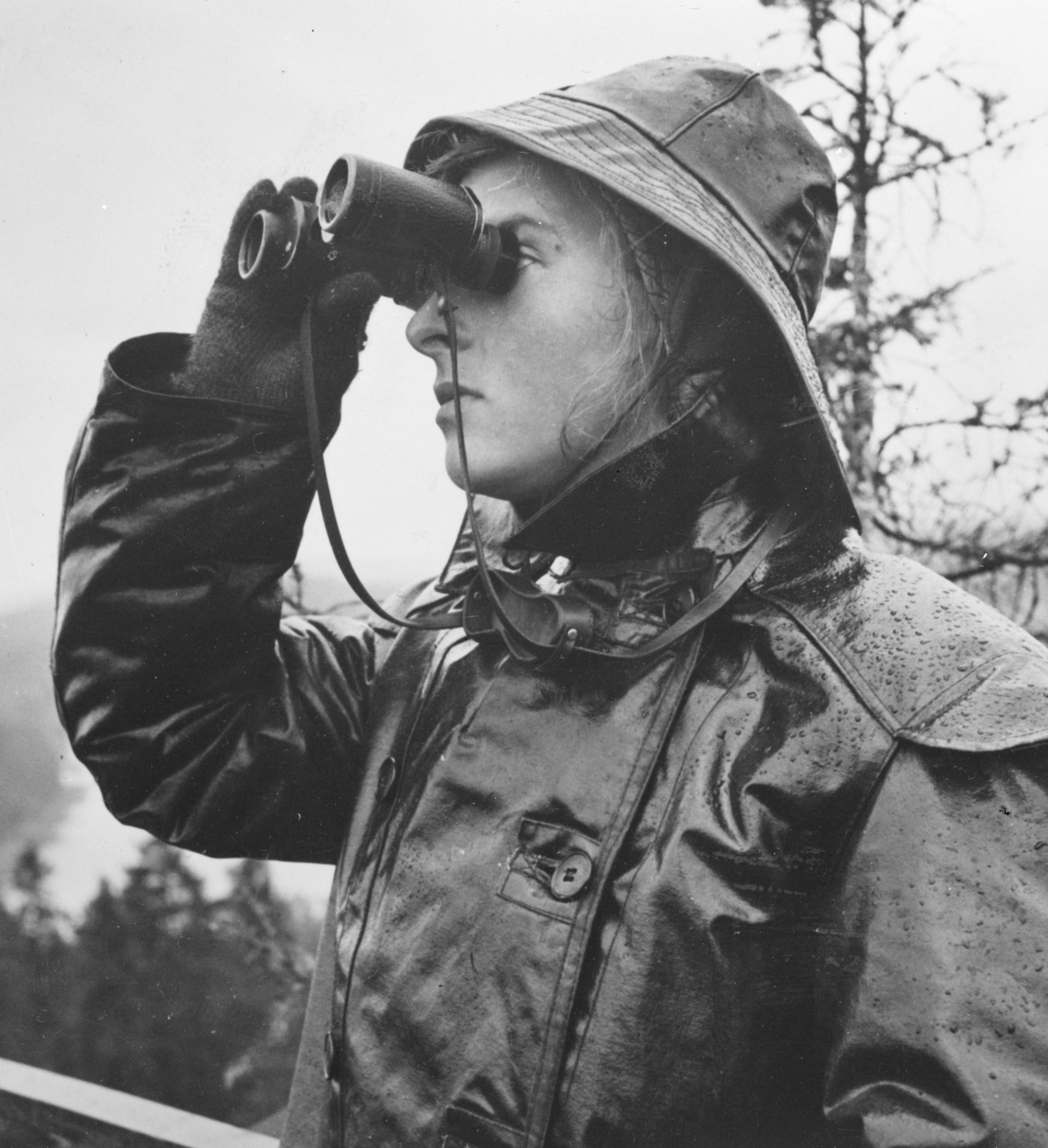
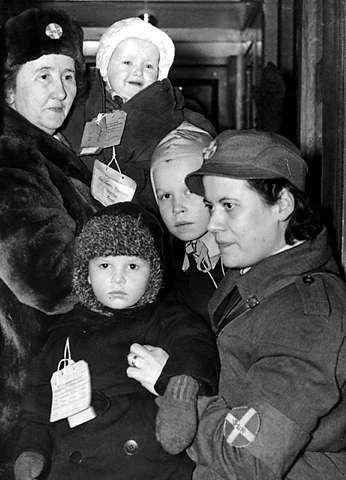
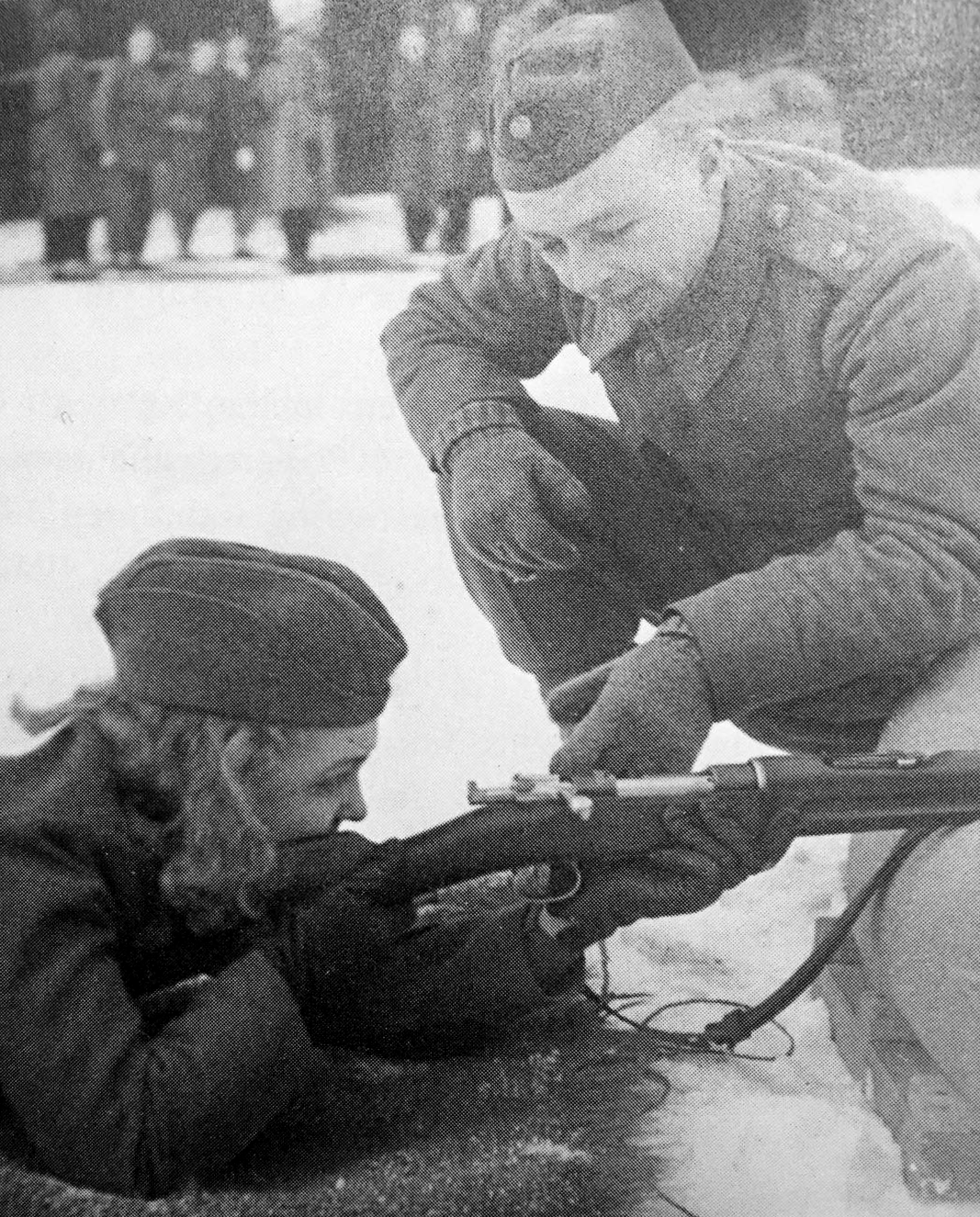
- Left: Lotta performing air surveillance in 1942.
- Center: SLK with Finnish war children during World War II, 1944.
- Right: Lotta receiving self-defence weapon training at the Svea Life Guards, 1944.

During World War II, the organization received many new duties. Due to limited manpower it was decided to let organisation members perform service duties of non-combat nature in Sweden's army, navy and air force branches. It was during this period that members of the organisation started being called lottor, as their original name "Landstormskvinnor" did not fit their new roles. This soon became official as the Swedish landstorm militia was scrapped and replaced with the Swedish home guard in 1942, turning the organisation independent. The new organisation name became Riksförbundet Sveriges lottakårer ("The national federation of Sweden's Lotta corps").

The war also rapidly increased the number of organisation members and by the end of the war the organization had more than 110,000 members, which meant that about five percent of Sweden's women over 15 years were part of the organisation.

=== Postwar ===
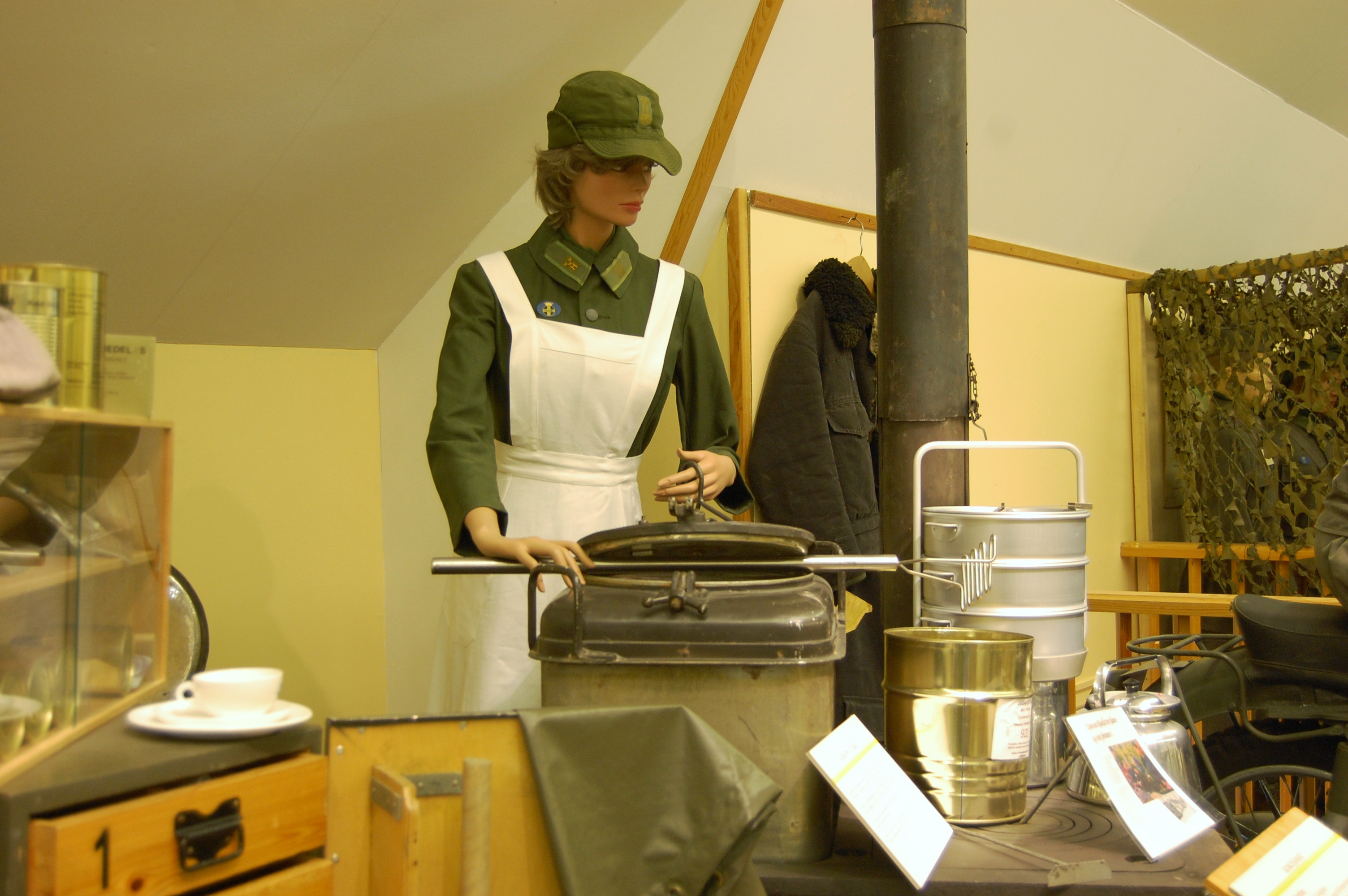
Swedish Women's Voluntary Defence Organization museum exhibition depicting a "Cooking-Lotta" in 1970's uniform.

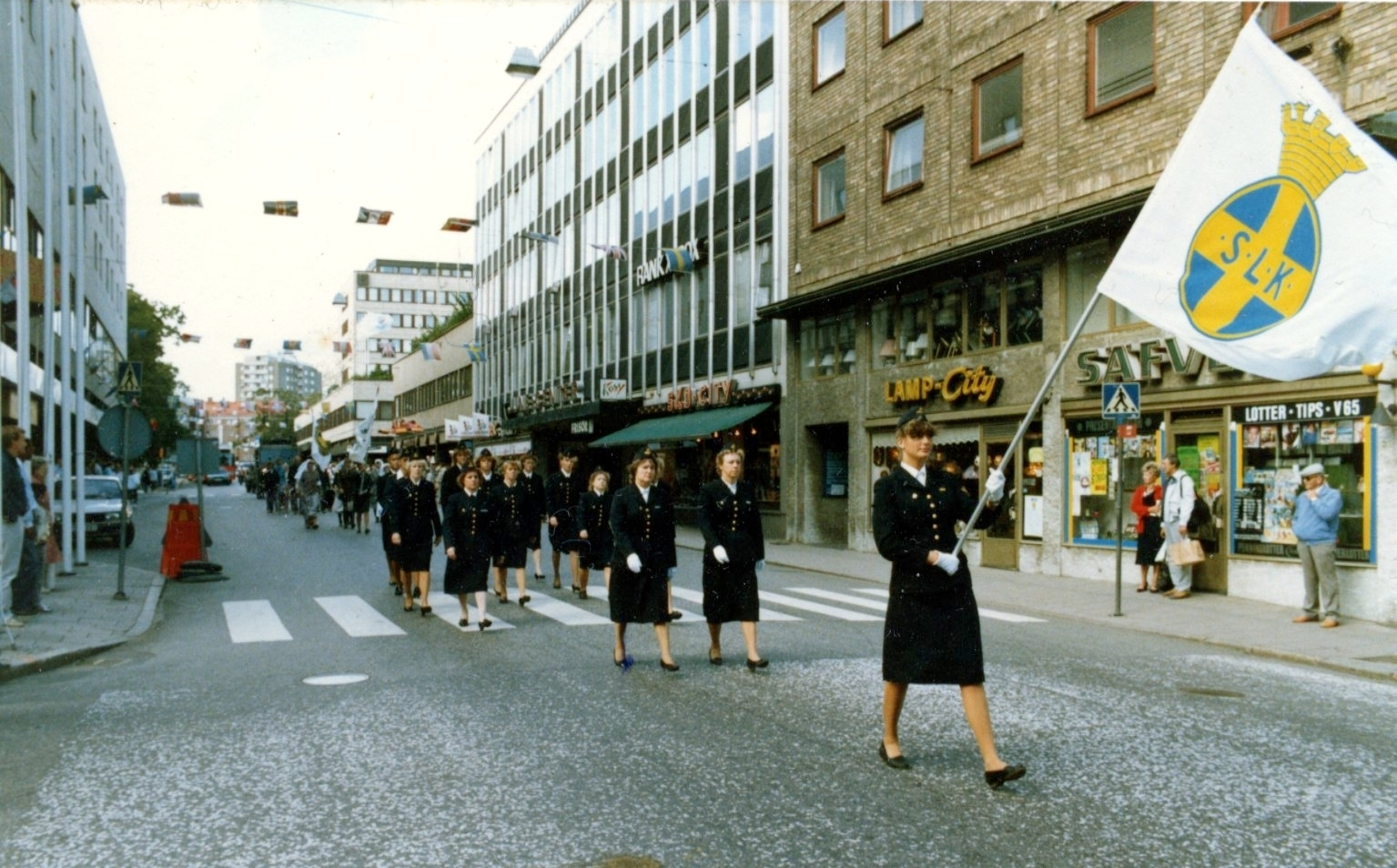
The corps parades in Jönköping in 1984.

Post World War II, SLK continued to perform many non-combatant roles tasks and roles in the Swedish Armed Forces-organization.

In 1989 the Swedish military started allowing women into all positions within the Swedish armed forces. This meant that the Swedish Women's Voluntary Defence Organization was no longer the only true option for women to get an active role in the defence of Sweden. An equivalent change in Denmark the same year had led to the dissolution of their "Lotta movement" Lottekorps. However in Sweden the organisation would remain as they still held important roles in the Swedish defence, as well as their cultural value.

In 2008 the organisation updated their graphical profile and changed their communicative name into Svenska Lottakåren ("The Swedish Lotta Corps"). The old name "Riksförbundet Sveriges lottakårer" was however kept as the official juridical name.

== Awards and decorations ==
Members and non-members of the Swedish Women's Voluntary Defence Organization which have benefited the organization can be awarded different awards and decorations, for example the Swedish Women's Voluntary Defence Organization Royal Medal of Merit in gold and silver (awarded since 1943) and the Swedish Women's Voluntary Defence Organization Medal of Merit in gold (awarded since 1967) and silver (awarded since 1944).

== Heads ==
- 1924–1931: Tyra Wadner
- 1931–1945: Maja Schmidt
- 1945–1959: Märta Stenbeck
- 1959–1966: Ingrid Norlander
- 1966–1974: Louise Ulfhielm
- 1974–1978: Alice Trolle-Wachtmeister
- 1978–1986: Christine Malmström Barke
- 1986–1994: Marianne af Malmborg
- 1994–2002: Nini Engstrand
- 2002–2008: Elisabeth Falkemo
- 2008–2014: Annette Rihagen
- 2014–2018: Barbro Isaksson
- 2018–2022: Heléne Rådemar
- 2022- : Eva Nolsäter

== Other Lotta movements ==
- Finland: Lotta Svärd (1918–1944) (Note: See the article Lotta Svärd.)
- Estonia:Naiskodukaitse "NKK" (1924–present)
- Norway: Norges Lotteforbund "NFL" (1928–present)
- Denmark: Lottekorps (1946–1989)
- Latvia: Aizsardzes, the female section of the Aizsargi (1926–1940)
