= Swedish Women's Voluntary Defence Organization Medal of Merit =

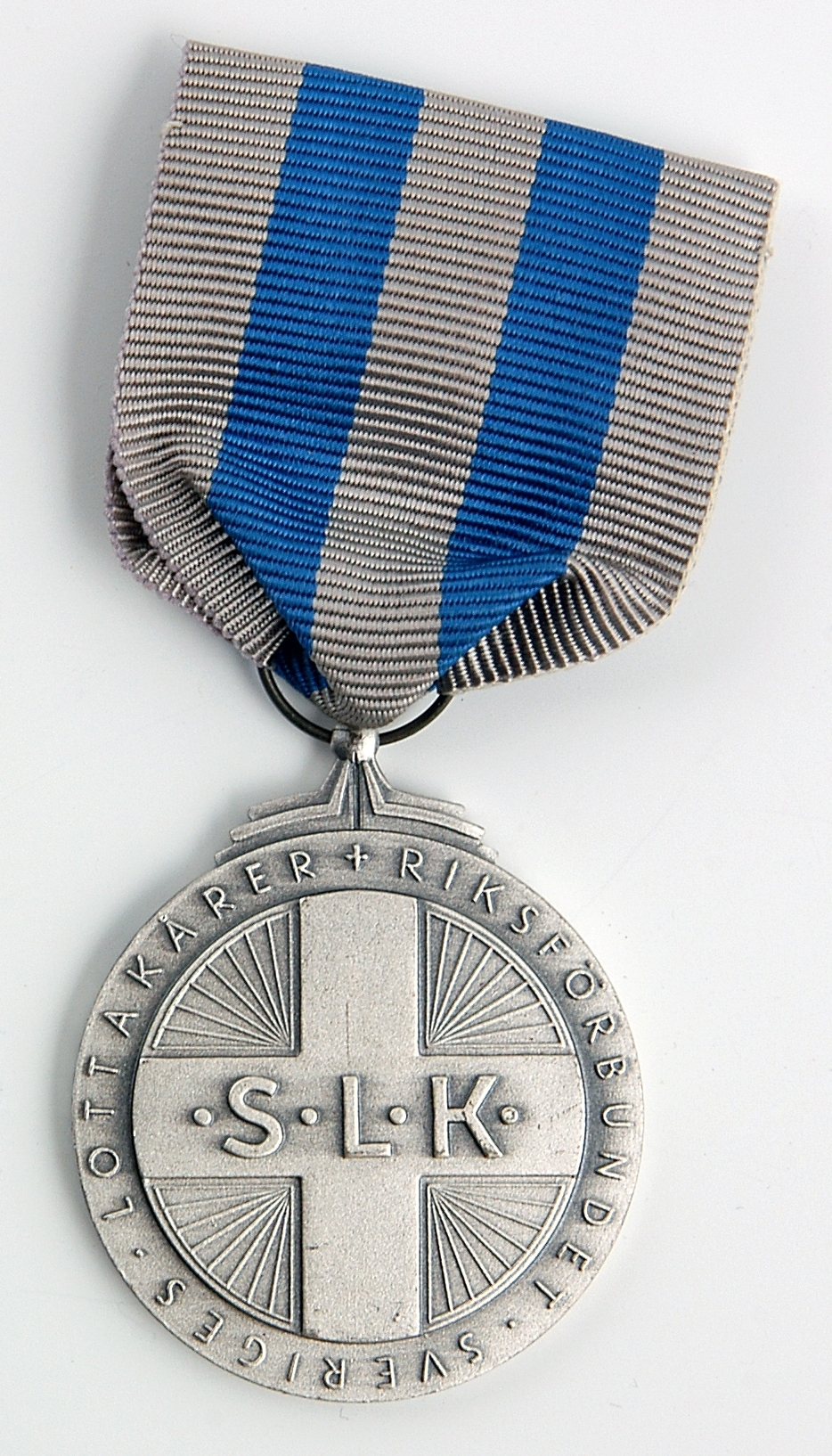
- The medal in silver
- Type: Category L-medal (Note: Category L includes merit badges or remembrance instituted by the Swedish Armed Forces' organizational units (units, centers and schools), the Home Guard and voluntary defense organizations. The category also includes previously granted carrying permits for e.g. officers 'unions (equivalent) and military associations (kamratföreningar) as well as other badges that have been approved by Swedish Armed Forces Headquarters.)
- Awarded for: For personal effort which been useful for the organization through extraordinarily meritorious activities
- Country: Sweden
- Presented by: Swedish Women's Voluntary Defence Organization
- Eligibility: Swedish and foreign personnel (gold medal only)
- Status: Currently awarded
- Established: 1944 (silver); 1967 (gold)
- Ribbon bars (top: gold; bottom: silver)

Precedence
- Next (higher): Swedish Women's Voluntary Defence Organization Royal Medal of Merit

The Swedish Women's Voluntary Defence Organization Medal of Merit (Swedish: Riksförbundet Sveriges lottakårers förtjänstmedalj, SLKgm/sm) is a medal awarded by the Swedish Women's Voluntary Defence Organization since 1944 (silver) and 1967 (gold) for personal effort which has been useful for the organization through extraordinarily meritorious activities.

== History ==
The Swedish Women's Voluntary Defence Organization Royal Medal of Merit in silver was established in 1944 and the one in gold in 1967.

== Appearance ==
=== Medal ===
The gold medal is embossed in gilded metal and the silver medal in silver-plated metal in the eighth size. The obverse of the medal is provided with the organization's emblem and the reverse with the inscription Förtjänster om Sveriges Lottaorganisation ("Merits about the Swedish Women's Voluntary Defence Organization").

=== Ribbon ===
The ribbon for the gold medal is divided in grey, blue, yellow, blue and grey moiré pattern and the silver medal divided in grey, blue, grey, blue and grey moiré.

Ribbon bar (gold medal)

Ribbon bar (silver medal)

== Criteria ==
=== General criteria ===
Medals are preferably awarded to members of the organization. The medal can also be awarded to Swedish citizens who is not a member as a reward for many years of meritorious efforts for the benefit of the organization. Examples are unit commanders, instructors, representatives of the Home Guard or voluntary organizations and other executives within the Swedish Total Defence system with whom the organization collaborates. When examining the application for a non-member, consideration must be given to work initiatives for the organization and the commitment shown in addition to the collaboration commitments that may be included in the person's ordinary duties.

The first medal of merit is usually the Swedish Women's Voluntary Defence Organization Medal of Merit in silver. Exceptions can be made in accordance with current practice in the Swedish award system, in the opinion of the Chief of the Swedish Women's Voluntary Defence Organization. Thus, the Swedish Women's Voluntary Defence Organization Medal of Merit in gold and the Swedish Women's Voluntary Defence Organization Royal Medal of Merit in silver can in individual cases be the first medal of merit. The first medal of merit can be awarded after four years of effort. For non-members, a candidate with a shorter time may be considered.

=== Gold medal ===
Can be awarded to Swedish citizens who, through very great personal effort, have benefited the Swedish Women's Voluntary Defence Organization through extraordinarily meritorious activities, usually for at least 7 years.

=== Silver medal ===
Can be awarded to Swedish citizens who, through very great personal effort, have benefited the Swedish Women's Voluntary Defence Organization through extraordinarily meritorious activities, usually for at least 4 years.

== Presenting ==
The gold and silver medal is awarded at union meetings.

== See also ==
- Swedish Women's Voluntary Defence Organization Royal Medal of Merit
