= Swedish Women's Voluntary Defence Organization Royal Medal of Merit =

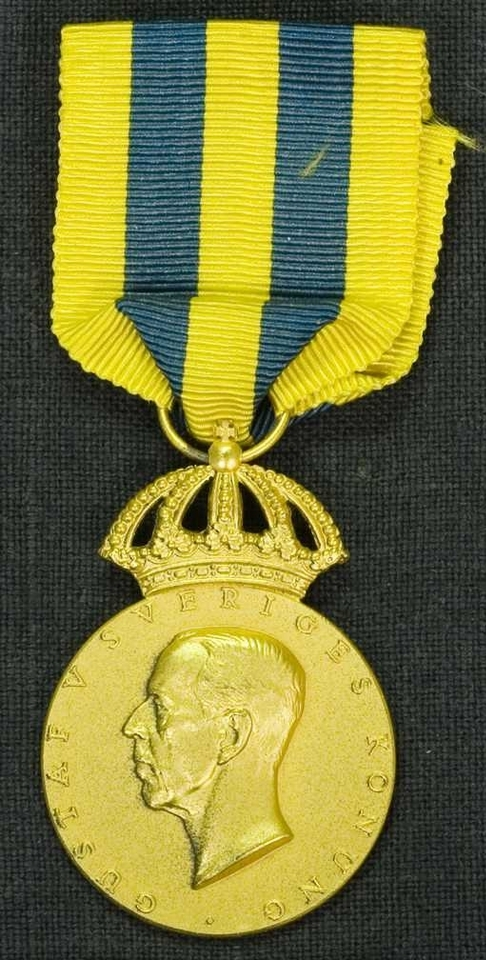
- Medal in gold with pre-1968 ribbon and picture of Gustaf V
- Type: Semi-official medal (Note: Category K of semi-official medals include, with His Majesty the King's permission established and with his approval, medals (badges) awarded by various organizations. The medals has often the king's image on the obverse.)
- Awarded for: Great personal effort has been beneficial to the organization through extraordinarily meritorious activities.
- Country: Sweden
- Presented by: Swedish Women's Voluntary Defence Organization
- Eligibility: Swedish and foreign personnel (gold medal only)
- Status: Currently awarded
- Established: 1943
- Ribbon bars (top: gold medal since 1968) (bottom: gold/silver medal until 1968)

Precedence
- Next (lower): Swedish Women's Voluntary Defence Organization Medal of Merit

The Swedish Women's Voluntary Defence Organization Royal Medal of Merit (Swedish: Riksförbundet Sveriges lottakårers kungliga förtjänstmedalj, SLKGM/SM) is a medal awarded by the Swedish Women's Voluntary Defence Organization since 1943 for great personal effort has been beneficial to the organization through extraordinarily meritorious activities.

== History ==
The Swedish Women's Voluntary Defence Organization Royal Medal of Merit was established in 1943.

== Appearance ==
=== Medal ===
The gold medal is embossed in gilded metal and the silver medal in silver-plated metal in the eighth size. The obverse of the medal is provided with the His Majesty the King's image and the reverse with the organization's emblem. The medal is provided with a royal crown.

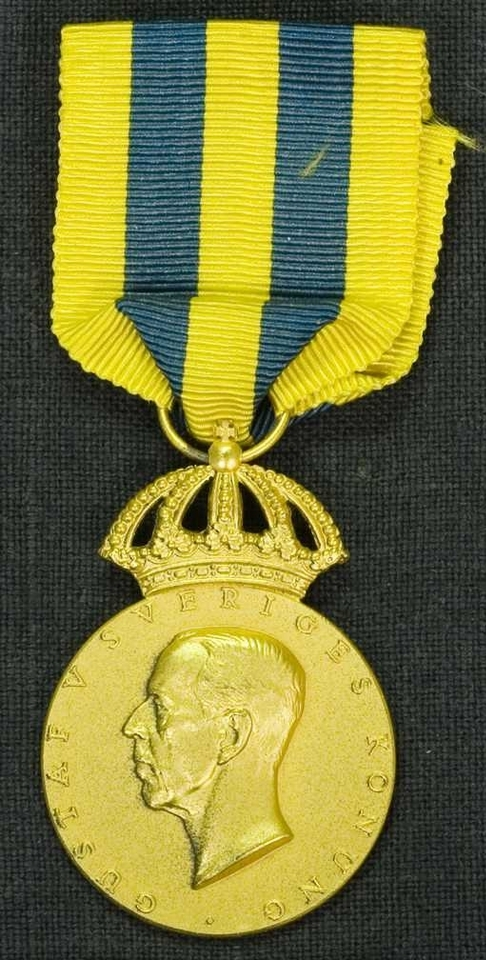
Medal in gold (obverse). Picture of Gustaf V and with pre-1968 ribbon for gold medal.

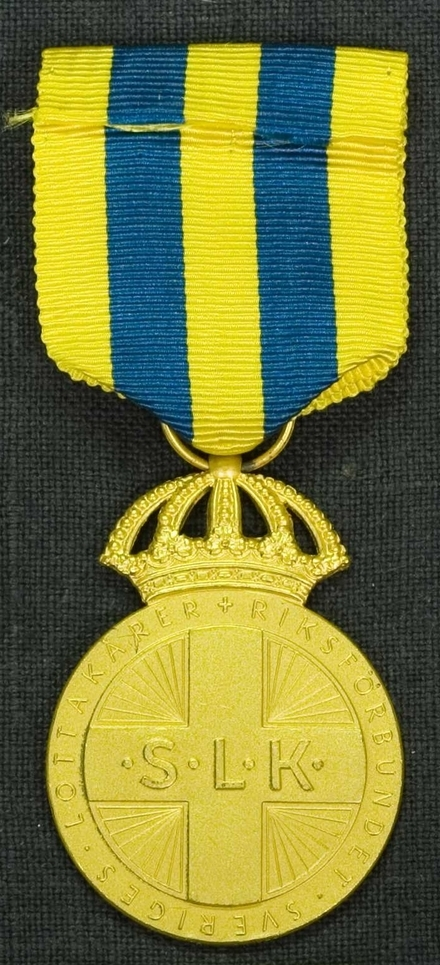
Medal in gold (reverse) with pre-1968 ribbon for gold medal.

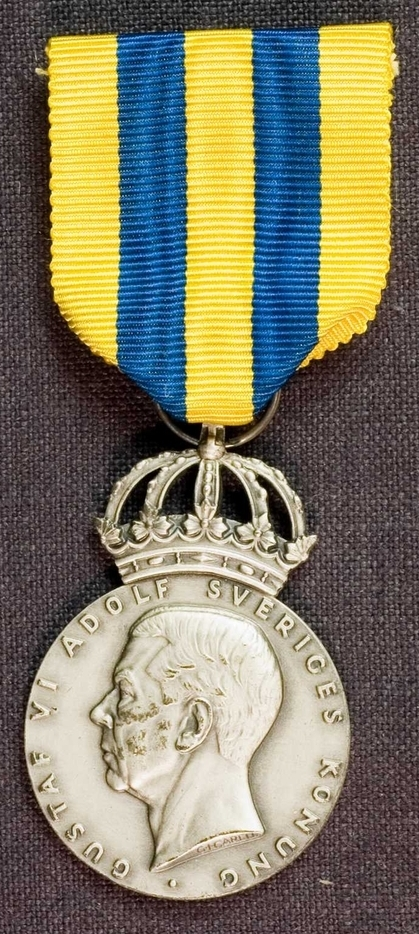
Medal in silver (obverse). Picture of Gustaf VI Adolf.

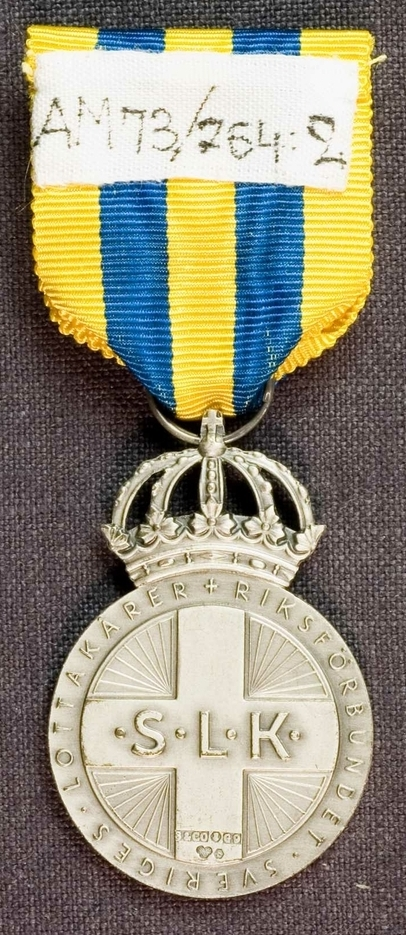
Medal in silver (reverse)

=== Ribbon ===
The ribbon for the gold medal is since 1968 divided in blue, yellow, blue, yellow and blue moiré pattern and the silver medal divided in yellow, blue, yellow, blue and yellow moiré.

Ribbon bar for gold medal (1968–present)

Ribbon bar for gold medal (1943–1968) and silver medal (1943–present)

== Criteria ==
=== General criteria ===
Medals are preferably awarded to members of the organization. The medal can also be awarded to a Swedish citizen who is not a member as a reward for many years of meritorious efforts for the benefit of the organization. Examples are the unit commanders, instructors, representatives of the Home Guard or voluntary organizations and other executives within the Swedish Total Defence system with whom the organization collaborates. When examining the application for a non-member, consideration must be given to work initiatives for the organization and the commitment shown in addition to the collaboration commitments that may be included in the person's ordinary duties.

The first medal of merit is usually the Swedish Women's Voluntary Defence Organization Medal of Merit in silver. Exceptions can be made in accordance with current practice in the Swedish award system, in the opinion of the chief of the Swedish Women's Voluntary Defence Organization. Thus, the Swedish Women's Voluntary Defence Organization Medal of Merit in gold and the Swedish Women's Voluntary Defence Organization Royal Medal of Merit in silver can in individual cases be the first medal of merit. The first medal of merit can be awarded after four years of effort. For non-members, a candidate with a shorter time may be considered.

=== Gold medal ===
The gold medal can exceptionally and for special reasons be awarded to a foreign citizen as a certificate of honor for efforts that have benefited the Swedish Women's Voluntary Defence Organization.

Can be awarded to Swedish citizens who, through very great personal effort, have benefited the Swedish Women's Voluntary Defence Organization through extraordinarily deserving activities as a rule for at least 17 years.

=== Silver medal ===
Can be awarded to Swedish citizens who, through very great personal effort, have benefited the Swedish Women's Voluntary Defence Organization through extraordinarily meritorious activities, usually for at least 12 years.

== Presenting ==
The gold medal is usually awarded at national meetings. The silver medal is awarded at union meetings.

== See also ==
- Swedish Women's Voluntary Defence Organization Medal of Merit
