= Naiskodukaitse =

Voluntary organization in Estonia

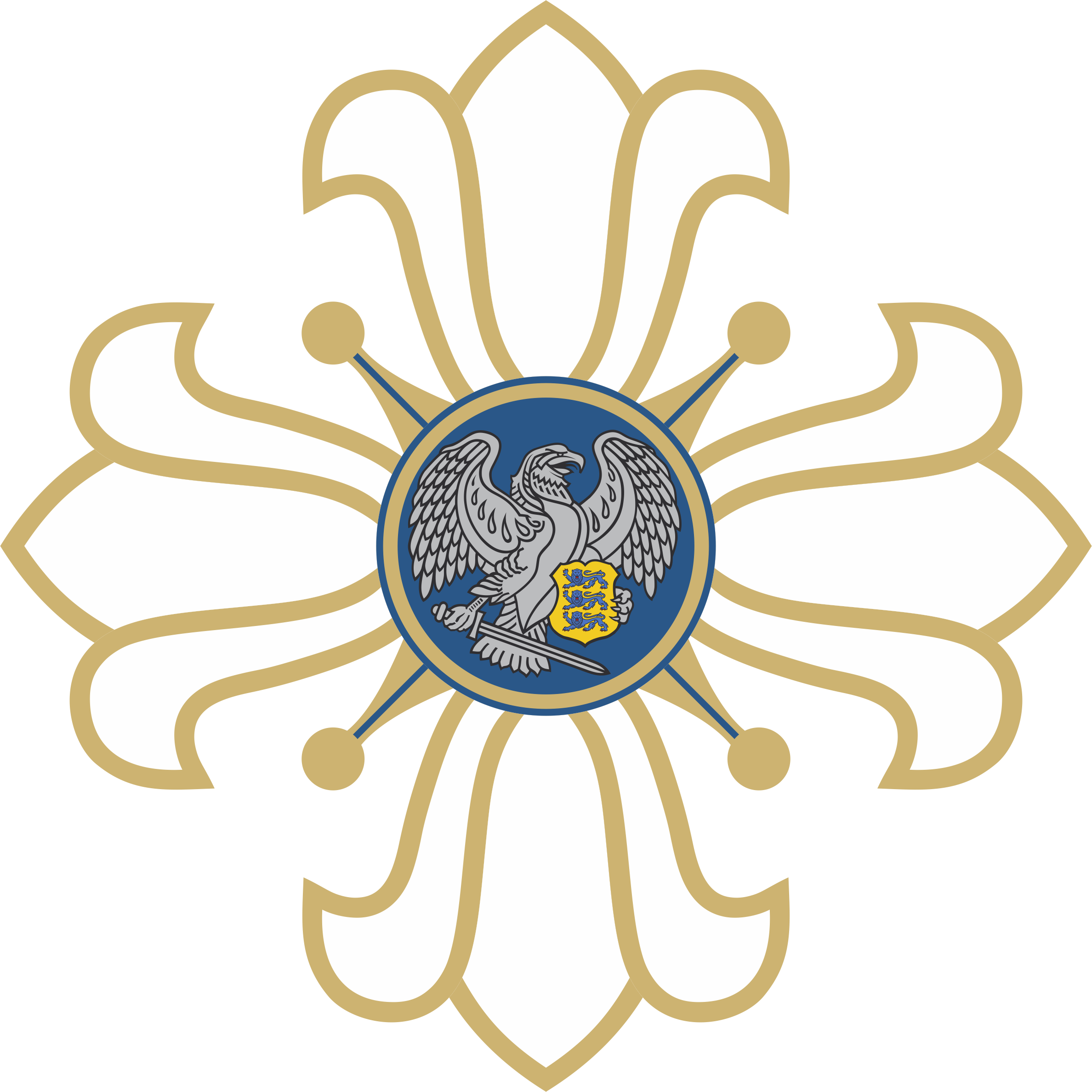
The Women's Home Defense's central symbol (lily cross).

The Naiskodukaitse (Women's Voluntary Defense Organization, Women's Home Guard, NKK) is a voluntary organization in Estonia, similar to Finland's Lotta Svärd, Sweden's Swedish Women's Voluntary Defence Organization, and Norway's Norges Lotteforbund.

The first divisions were formed in December 1924, including the "Lindade Kompanii" (Company of Lindas), which was created by the Estonian Women's Society. Similar units sprang up across the country from 1925–1926. On 2 September 1927 the NKK was officially established by the commander of the Estonian Defence League. Initial focus was on sanitation, economics, propaganda, cooking, supplies, and working with youths. By the 1930s membership had grown to close to 17,000 members. In 1932 the Naiskodukaitse helped create the Kodutütred, a youth organization in Estonia and in 1934 communications was added to the list of specialties for the NKK. It was disbanded in June 1940, along with the Defence League, after Estonia was annexed by the Soviet Union. In On 13 April 1942, four former Naiskodukaitse leaders were executed in a prison camp in Sosva and their overcoats collected as state revenue (while the clothes of other prisoners were determined to be worthless). They were Amanda Kannes from Tallinn, Mare Suik from Keila, Maria Tõrvand from Abja, and Linda Ude from Keil. At least 10 other Women's Home Guard members were also murdered at different locations after being arrested on 14 June 1941. The NKK was reformed on 20 September 1991, with the first unit created on 14 February 1992. Since 1998 Naiskodukaitse Memorial Day is celebrated close to St. George's Day. Interest in the Naiskodukaitse has increased since Russia's attack on Ukraine.
