= Norges Lotteforbund =

Voluntary organization in Norway

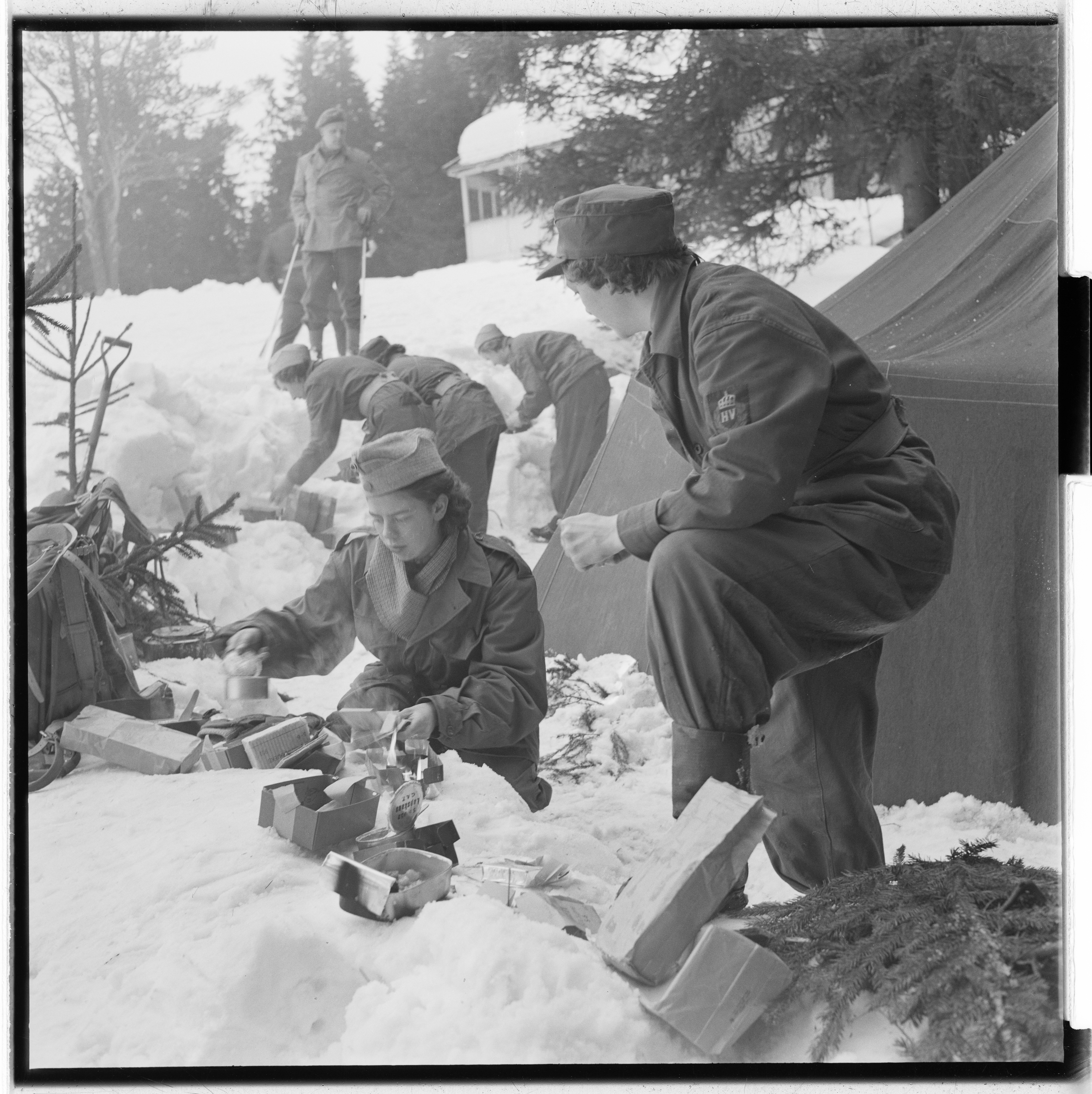
Volunteers of Norges Lotteforbund in 1953

The Norges Lotteforbund (Norwegian Lottery Association, NFL) is a voluntary civil-preparedness organization in Norway. It is similar to Finland's Lotta Svärd, Sweden's Swedish Women's Voluntary Defence Organization, and Estonia's Naiskodukaitse.

The NFL was founded in 1928 as the Norwegian Women's Voluntary Conscription under the leadership of Jacobine Rye, with the aim to strengthen and prepare volunteers that help their country in both peace and times of war. Members undergo training to assist military personnel (the Norwegian Home Guard), help emergency personnel, and learn about sanitation work, leadership, and more. During World War II, members contributed to the national resistance and humanitarian efforts. While officially disbanded by the occupying forces of Nazi Germany in 1943, it was reformed in 1945 under its new name. Membership was extended to men in 2019, with a vote of 22 for and 2 against. Membership in the Lotteforbund can serve as a fast track to joining the Home Guard since it offers basic military courses. Norwegian citizens can join at the age of 16.

Since 1948, Lottery Day has been celebrated on May 7.

As of 2024, the NFL has 18 local associations with around 751 members, and the main office is located at Akershus Fortress.
