= Flags of micronations =

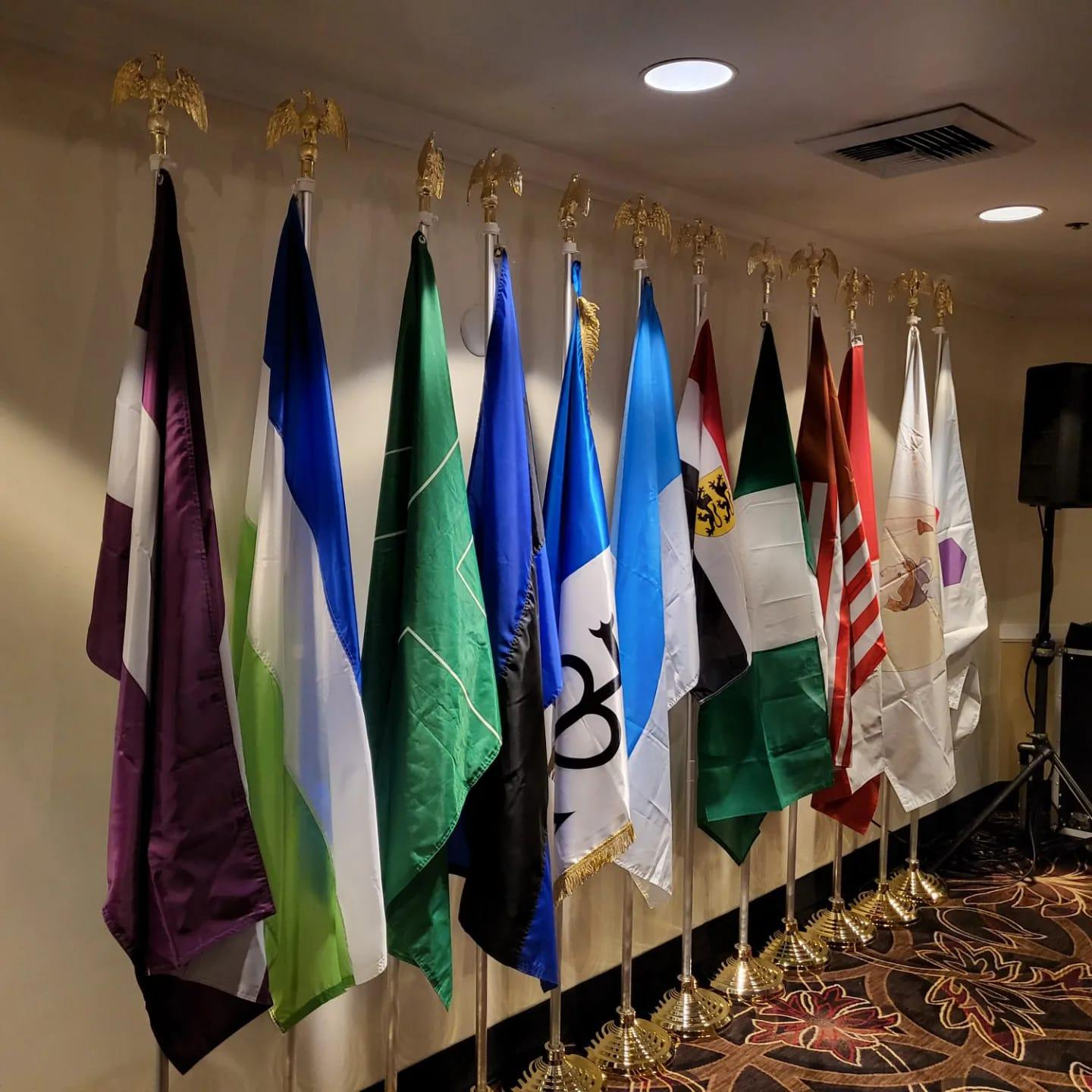
Flags of micronations and intermicronational organisations at MicroCon 2022

Micronations are ephemeral, self-proclaimed entities that claim to be independent sovereign states, but which are not acknowledged as such by any recognised sovereign state, or by any supranational organisation. The constant reiteration of the flag as a symbol of a something that exists by the entity that it symbolizes confirms the validity of the flag as an officially sanctioned and/or definitive symbol of an entity; therefore, there has been a close association between vexillology imagination in creating visual symbols that appear to legitimize micronational claims.

This article documents the designated national flags of micronations whose existence is verifiable in multiple, non-trivial third party reference sources, which have been cited in the linked encyclopedia articles for those entities.

Aerican Empire

Principality of Aigues-Mortes

Akhzivland

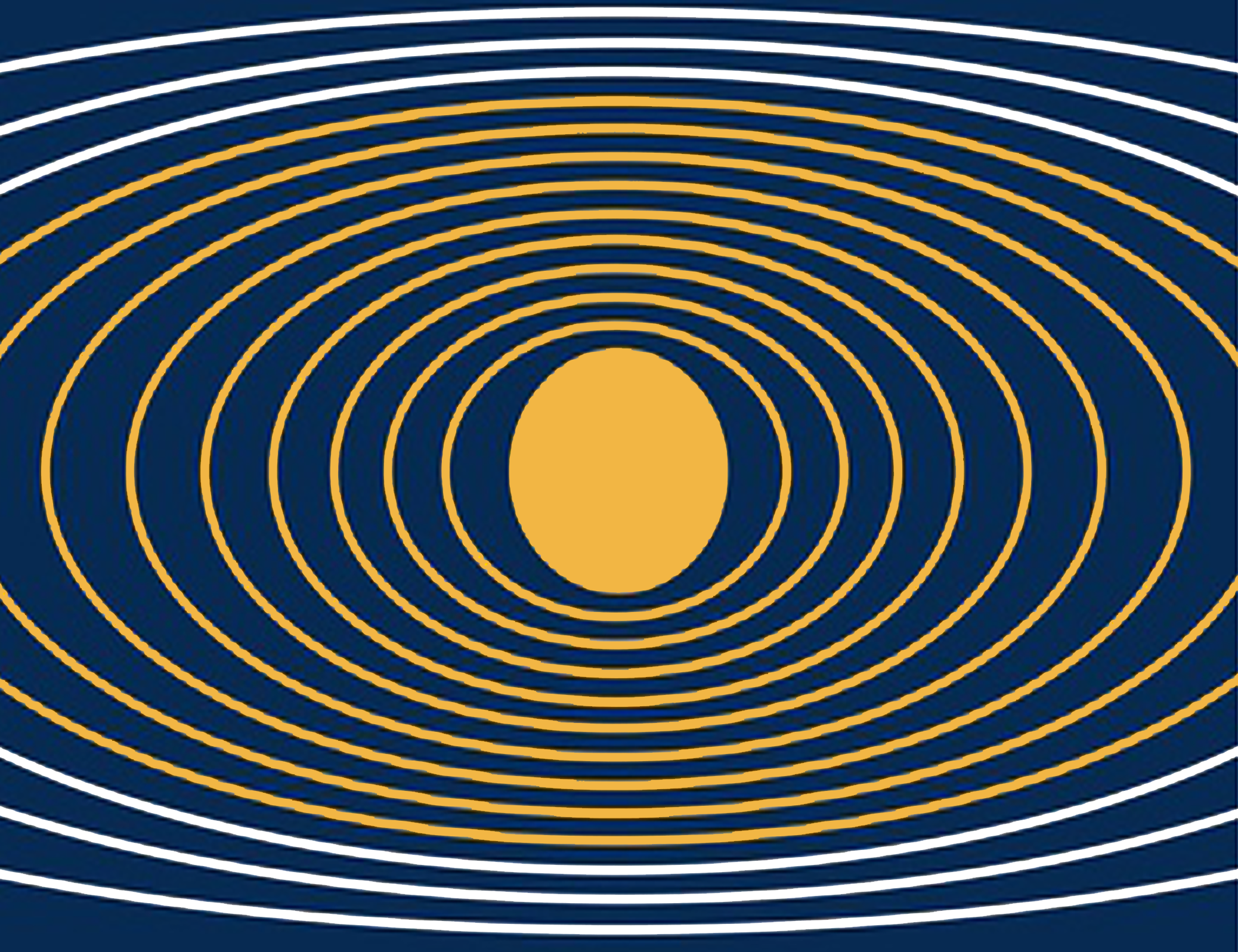
Asgardia

Empire of Atlantium

Empire of Austenasia

Christiania

Conch Republic

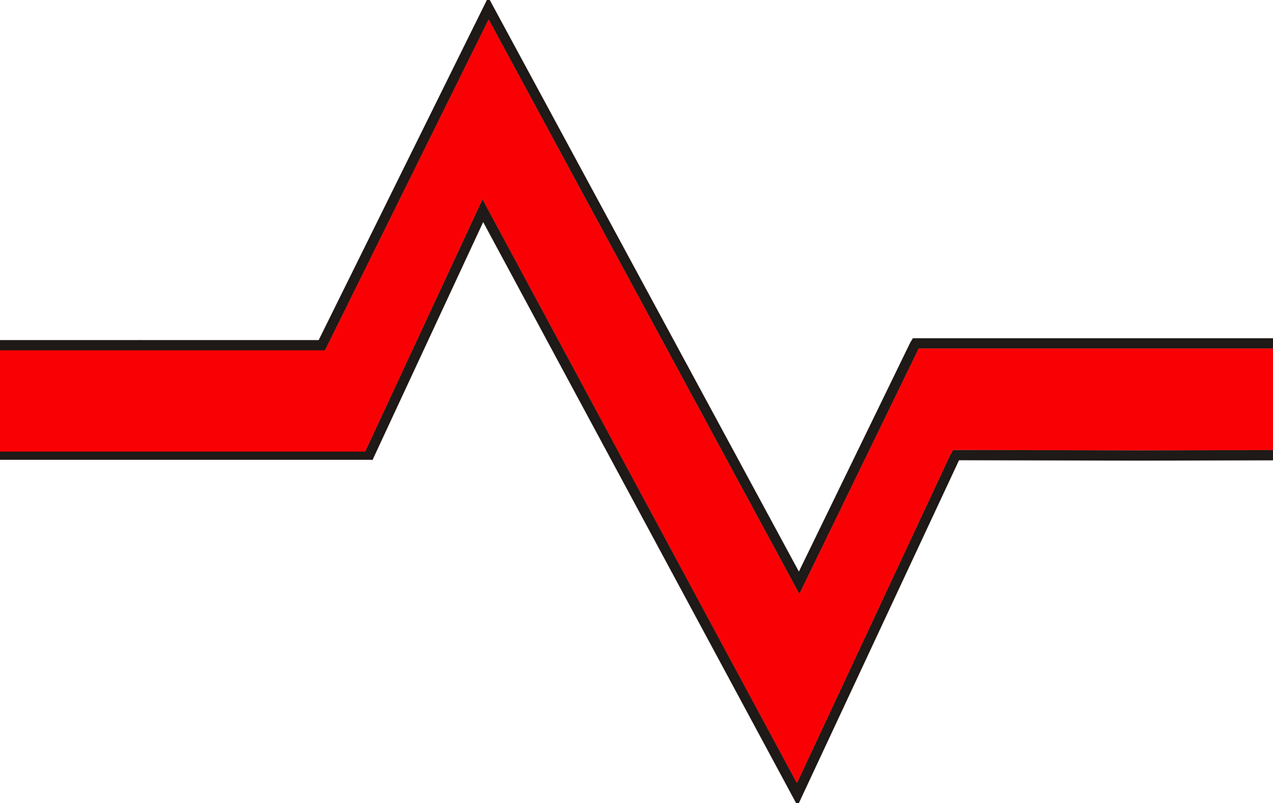
Elgaland-Vargaland

Kingdom of Elleore

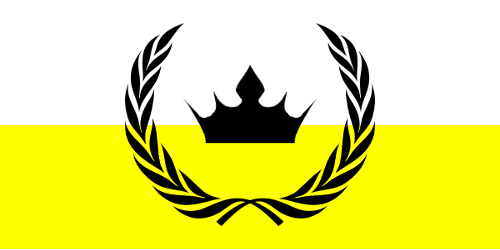
Enclava

Kingdom of EnenKio

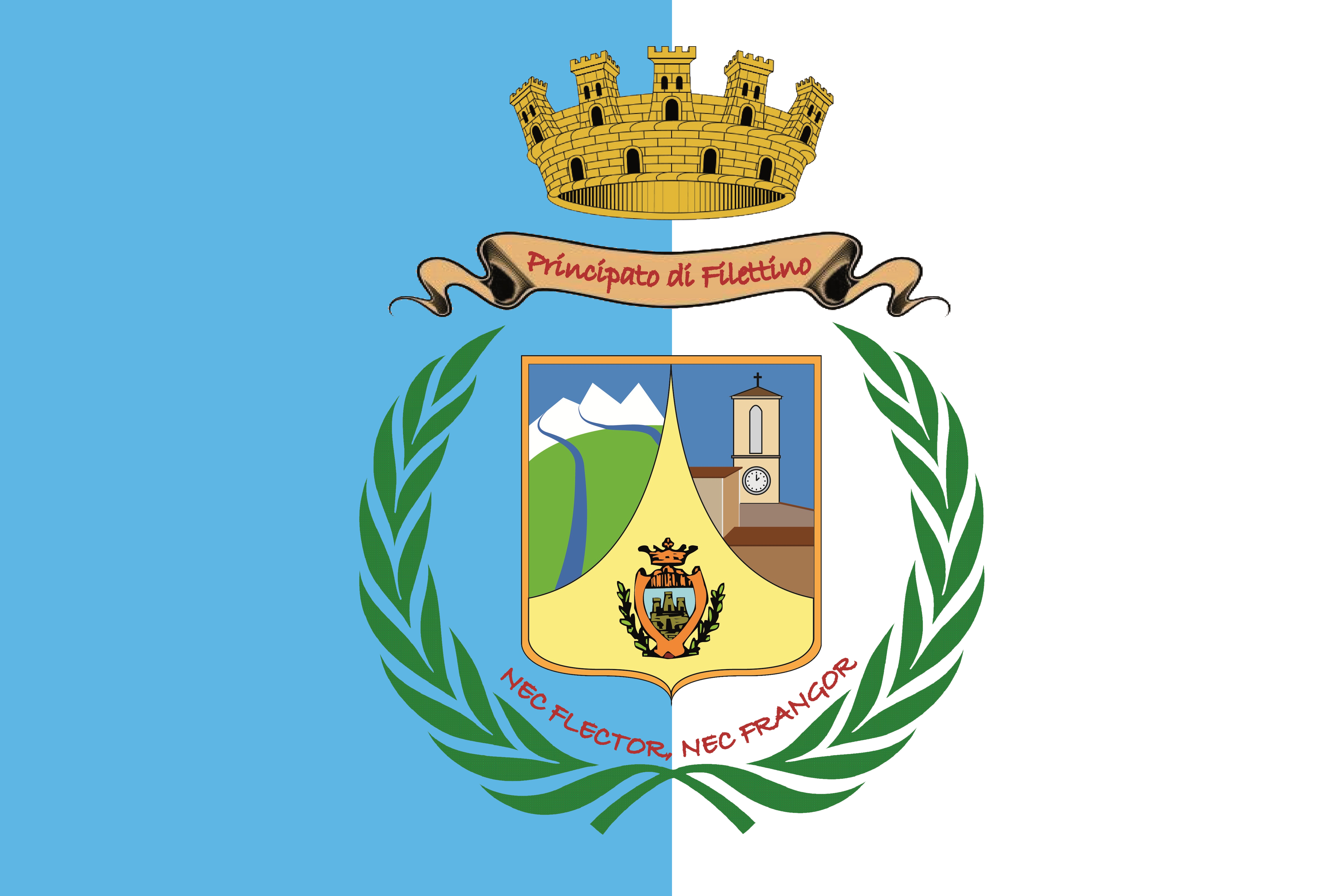
Filettino

Grand Duchy of Flandrensis

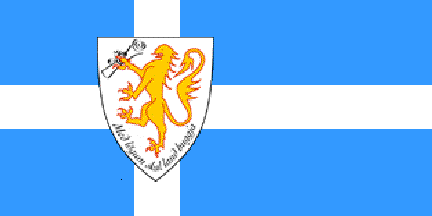
Forvik

Glacier Republic

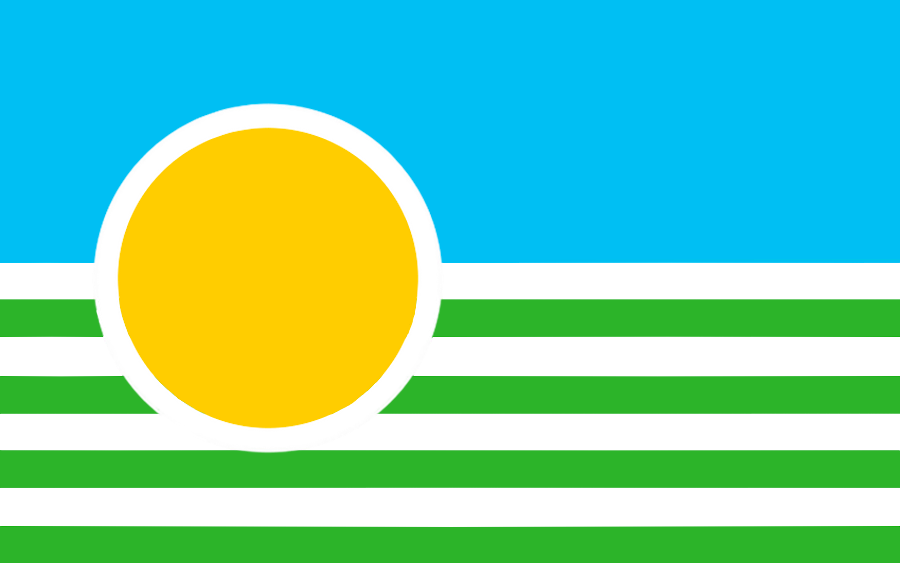
Principality of Islandia

Republic of Jamtland

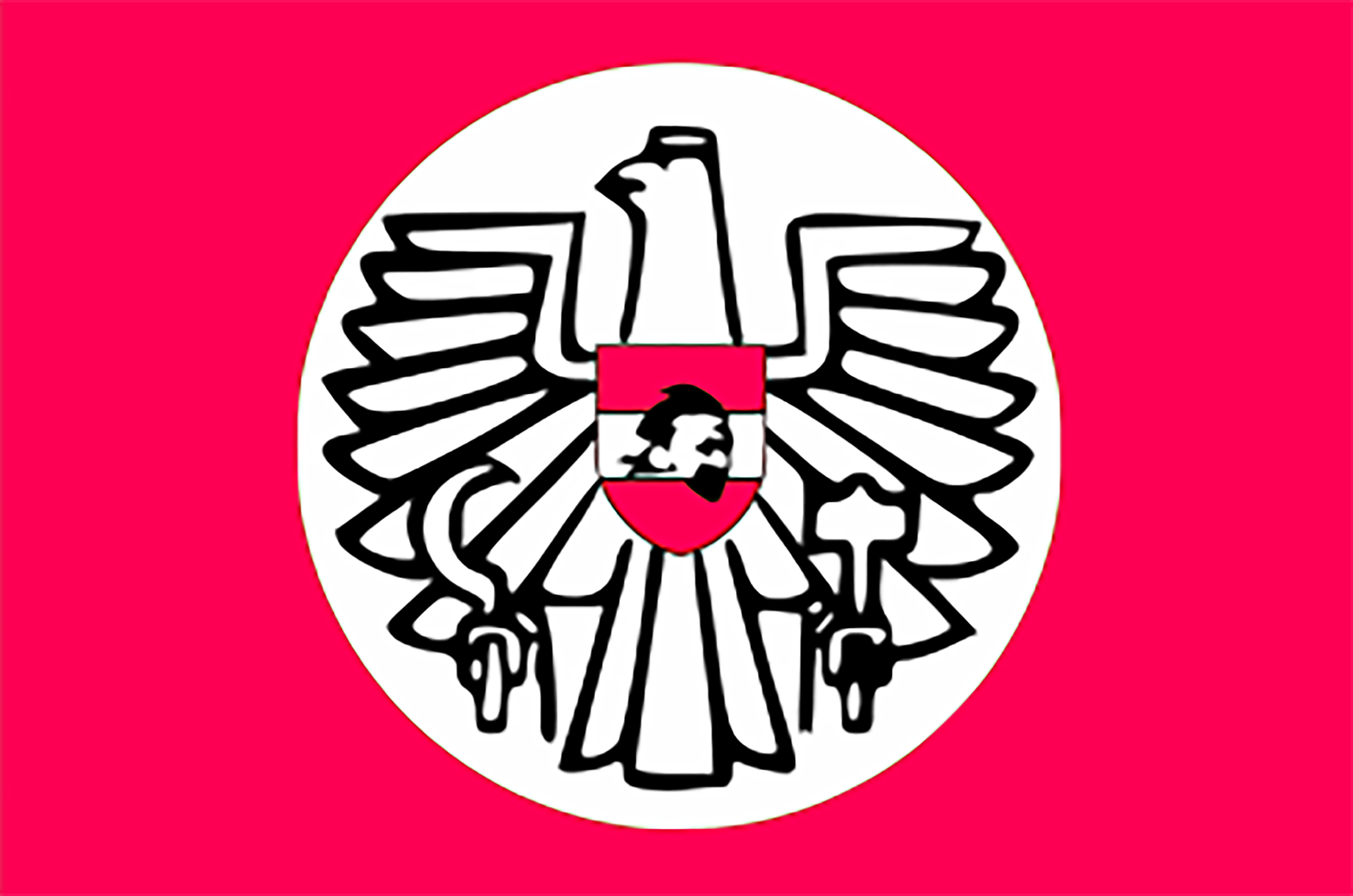
Kugelmugel

Principality of Laàs

Ladonia

Liberland

Free Borough of Llanrwst

Republic of Molossia

Murrawarri Republic

Naminara Republic

New Utopia

Kingdom of North Sudan

Nova Roma

Nutopia

Other World Kingdom

Parva Domus Magna Quies

Kingdom of Redonda

Holy Empire of Reunion

Romanov Empire

Republic of Saugeais

Principality of Sealand

Principality of Seborga

Principality of Snake Hill

Kingdom of Talossa

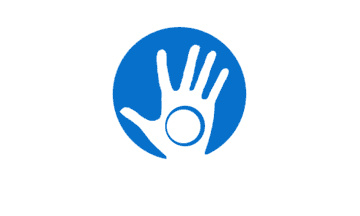
Republic of Užupis

Republic of Vevčani

Kingdom of Wallachia

Washitaw Nation

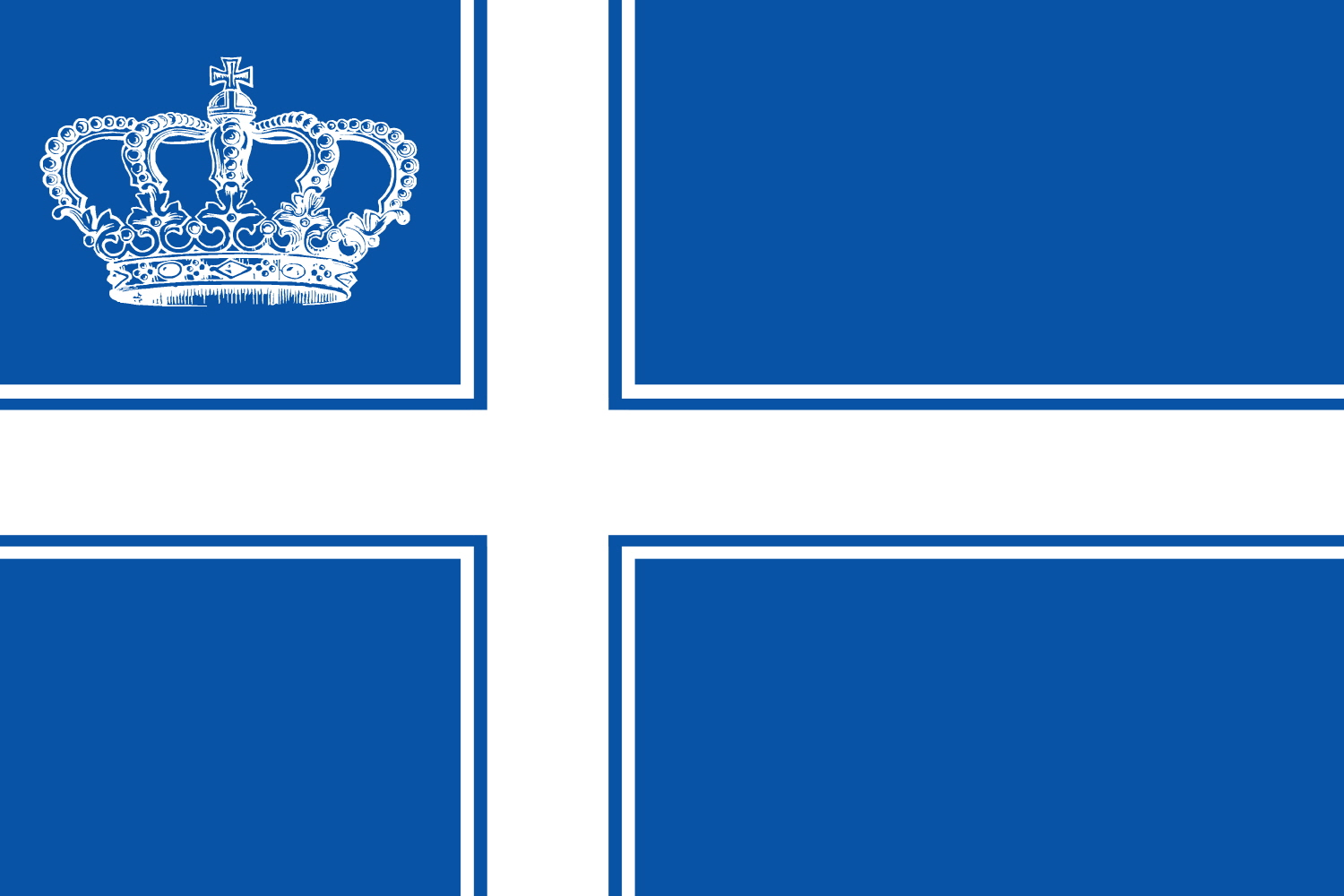
Westarctica

Principality of Wy

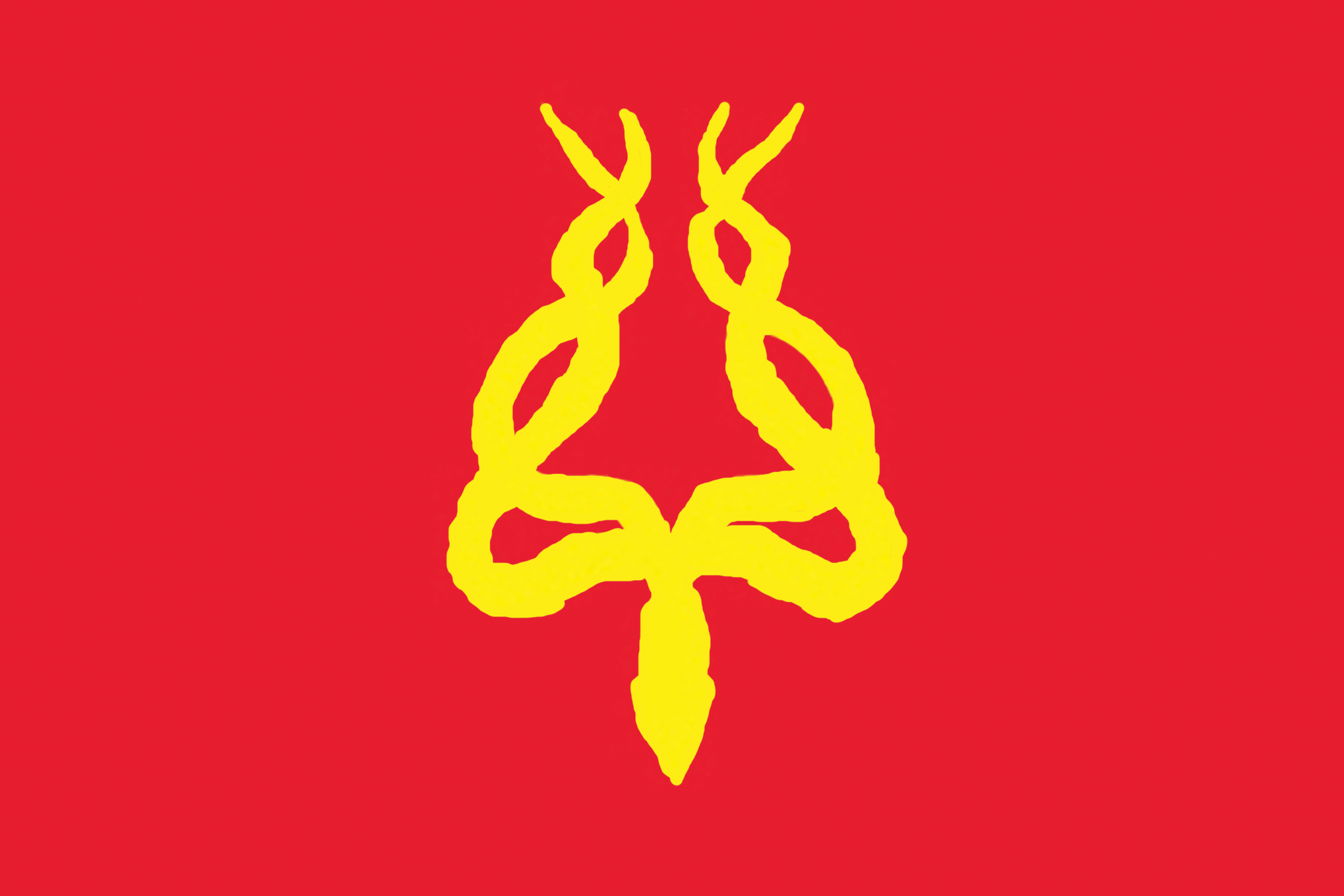
Zaqistan

== Former micronations ==
Aeterna Lucina

Independent State of Aramoana

Kingdom of Araucanía and Patagonia

Province of Bumbunga

Celestia

Republic of Fredonia

Principality of Freedonia

Frestonia

Gay and Lesbian Kingdom of the Coral Sea Islands

Kingdom of Humanity

Principality of Hutt River

Keraton Agung Sejagat

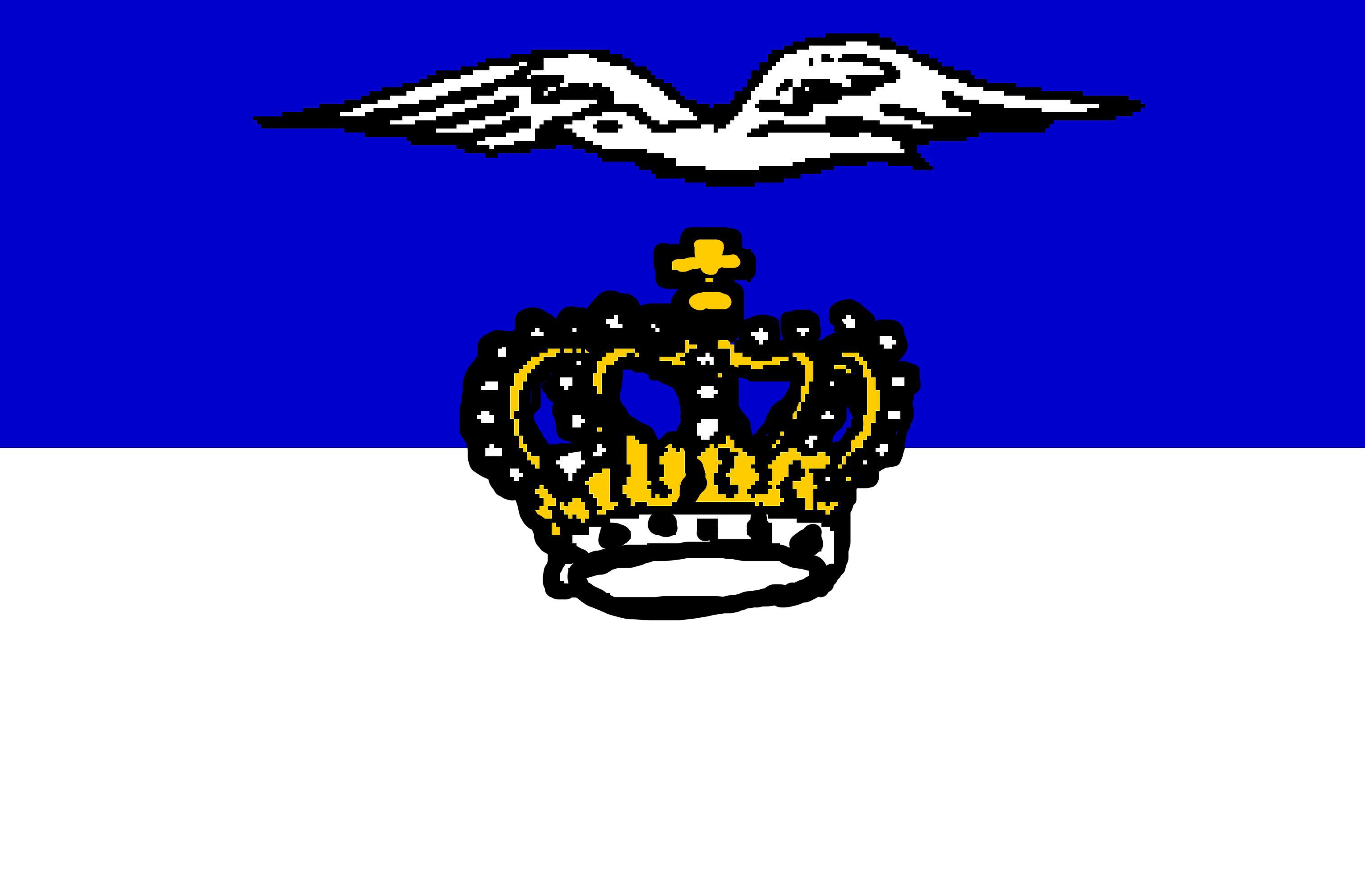
Republic of Koneuwe

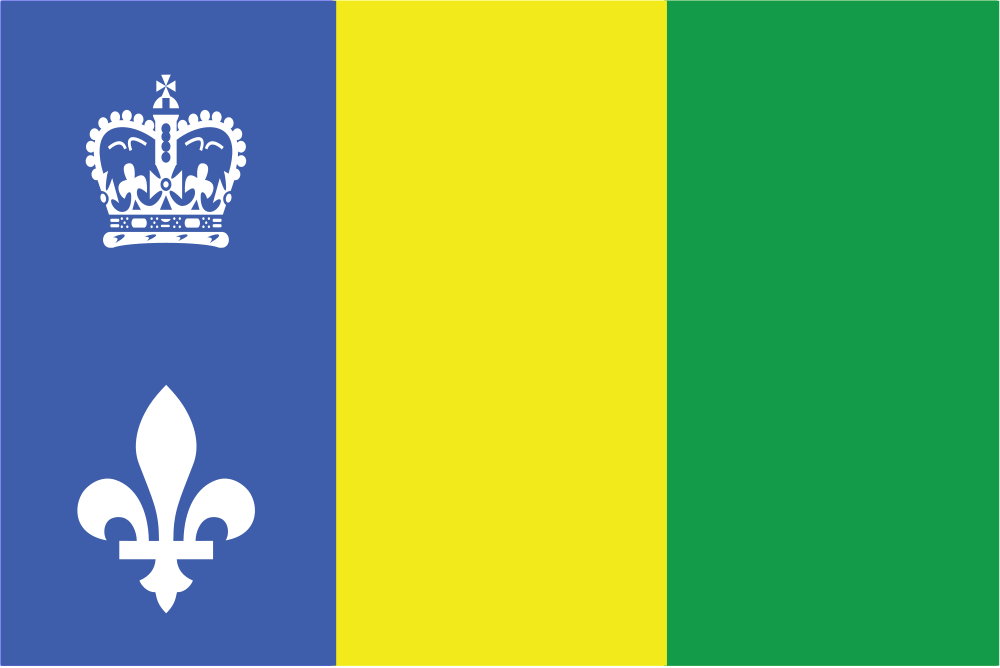
Kingdom of L'Anse-Saint-Jean

Kingdom of Lovely

Sultanate of M'Simbati

Principality of Marlborough

Republic of Minerva

Republic of Morac-Songhrati-Meads

New Atlantis

Principality of Outer Baldonia

Republic of Perloja

Islands of Refreshment

Republic of Rose Island

Rüterberg

State of Scott

Kingdom of Sedang

Sunda Empire

Kingdom of Tavolara

Principality of Trinidad

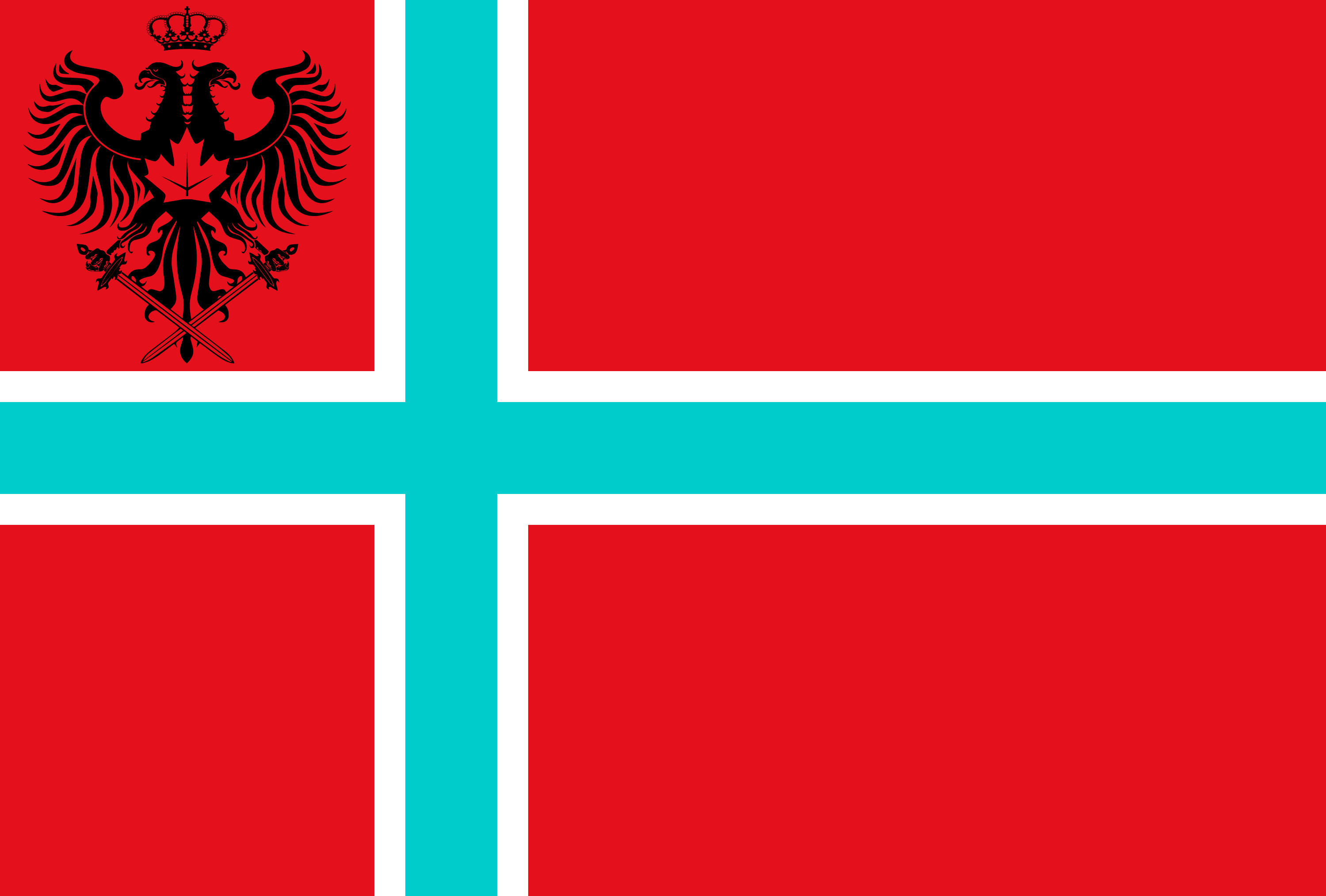
Kingdom of Vikesland (New flag)

Global State of Waveland

== See also ==
- Ethnic flag
- Flags of country subdivisions, such as U.S. states
- Gallery of flags of dependent territories, such as British overseas territories
- Lists of city flags
- List of former sovereign states
- List of micronations
