= List of micronations =

Micronations, sometimes also referred to as model countries and new country projects, are small, self-proclaimed entities that assert their sovereignty as independent states but which are not acknowledged as such by any of the recognised sovereign states, or by any supranational organization. They should not be confused with microstates, which are recognised independent states of a small size, nor should they be confused with unrecognised states, which are of more geopolitical significance because they exercise clear control of actual territory to the exclusion of widely recognized countries.

Motivations for the creation of micronations include theoretical experimentation, political protest, artistic expression, personal entertainment and the conduct of criminal activity.

== Current ==
=== Antarctica ===
Flag	Year founded	Name	Description
flag	2008	Grand Duchy of Flandrensis	Founded as a short-term hobby, Flandrensis eventually became active in raising awareness of climate change, particularly as it affects polar ice and glaciers.
flag	2001	Grand Duchy of Westarctica	Founded by Travis McHenry, Westarctica claims most of Marie Byrd Land. The micronations Melchezidek and Talossa (q.v.) also assert ownership of this area.

=== Antigua and Barbuda ===
Antigua and Barbuda
Flag	Year founded	Name	Description
flag	1865 (traditional) 1929 (historical)	Kingdom of Redonda	Redonda is a small, uninhabitable island south-west of Antigua. According to writer M. P. Shiel in 1929, Redonda was claimed by his father, with the consent of the British Colonial Office. Since 1967, the title of King of Redonda has been disputed, with multiple claimants.

=== Australia ===
Australia
Flag	Year founded	Name	Description
flag	1981	Empire of Atlantium	This progressive micronation claims a minuscule amount of territory in New South Wales, but advocates for the abolition of international borders, and free migration.
—N/a	1980s	Grand Duchy of Avram	Avram does not claim any territory, and primarily exists as a micronational bank, based in Australia. The Australian government brought several lawsuits against Avram's founder, John Charlton Rudge. These finally resulted in a ruling that Rudge had committed no crimes, and his banking activities subsequently were allowed to resume.
flag	2013	Murrawarri Republic	Residents of the traditional homeland of the Muruwari people formed this micronation in Queensland and New South Wales as part of the Australian Indigenous Sovereignty movement.
flag	2003	Principality of Snake Hill	A family in New South Wales who were unable to afford their taxes seceded from Australia.
flag	2004	Principality of Wy	During a long-running dispute with the local council over a building permit, Paul Delprat seceded from Mosman, a suburb of Sydney. He did not claim to have seceded from New South Wales or Australia, however. Wy is a supporter of art.
—N/a	2013	Sovereign Yidindji Government	The Yidiny people, led by Murrumu Walubara Yidindji, formed this micronation in Queensland as part of the Australian Indigenous Sovereignty movement.

=== Austria ===
Austria
Flag	Year founded	Name	Description
flag	1975	Republic of Kugelmugel	An artist built a spherical residence in Katzelsdorf, resulting in a dispute with local authorities over construction permits for it. Four years later, the artist declared his unusual structure an independent state. In 1982, it was moved to its current location in the Prater, a large park in Leopoldstadt, Vienna, where it is maintained by the city as a tourist attraction. The republic has several hundred citizens (none of whom live in the building).

=== Belize ===
Belize
Flag	Year founded	Name	Description
flag	2018	Principality of Islandia	This crowdfunded micronation claims Coffee Cay, an uninhabited island near Belize City.

=== Chile ===
Chile
Flag	Year founded	Name	Description
flag	2014	Glacier Republic	In order to draw attention to the country's lack of legal protections for glaciers, Greenpeace declared Chile's ice sheets a micronation.

=== Czech Republic ===
Czech Republic
Flag	Year founded	Name	Description
flag	1996	Other World Kingdom	A BDSM resort specializing in female dominance, located in a château in Černá, Žďár nad Sázavou District, claims to be an independent matriarchy.
flag	1997	Kingdom of Wallachia	This micronation in Moravian Wallachia was founded as a joke. A leadership dispute eventually ended up in a Czech court.

=== Denmark ===
Denmark
Flag	Year founded	Name	Description
flag	1971	Freetown Christiania	Christiania is an intentional community and commune on the site of a former military base in Copenhagen. Known for its trade in cannabis, which is illegal in Denmark, the micronation was ranked in 2016 as the fourth most popular tourist attraction in Copenhagen.
flag	1944	Kingdom of Elleore	A group of schoolteachers declared the independence of Elleore, an island in a fjord of Zealand, after they had purchased it for a summer camp. It is uninhabited, except during an annual gathering of the micronation's citizens.

=== France ===
France
Flag	Year founded	Name	Description
flag	2010	Principality of Aigues-Mortes	The city of Aigues-Mortes named itself a principality as a publicity stunt. Its claim is based on a local legend of Louis IX bestowing the title of prince on one of his squires, who was from the city.
flag	2015	Principality of Laàs en Béarn	Alleging that it was neglected by the national government, the commune of Laàs seceded from France.
flag	1997	Holy Empire of Reunion	Brazilian law students created this "parody of the French overseas department" of Réunion, south-west of Mauritius Island.
flag	1921	Republic of Montmartre	The Republic of Montmartre (République de Montmartre) is a Parisian association, often referred to as a micronation. It was proposed in 1920 by the cartoonist Jean Barrez at a meeting attended by an audience that included several other artists. In the face of modern art and modern architecture, the association aimed to provide mutual support to Montmartre's artists and to protect the area of Paris from the excesses of developers. It quickly also developed into a charitable organization, working with poor children.
flag	1947	Republic of Saugeais	While the prefect of Doubs was visiting the Saugeais, a valley in his department, a local hotel owner referred to a "Republic of Saugeais". Going along with the joke, the prefect asked for details about the non-existent nation, which the hotel owner promptly invented. The prefect responded by naming him President of the Republic of Saugeais. The micronation comprises eleven communes in Doubs.

=== Israel ===
Israel
Flag	Year founded	Name	Description
flag	1971	Akhzivland	A squatter in the ancient, abandoned village of Achziv slowly established a popular vacation spot. Annoyed by the encroachment of various government projects, he and his wife finally declared their haven independent. He then brought a lawsuit against the Israeli government, which resulted in the award of a 99-year lease to him, but not full legal recognition of his micronation. Akhzivland's founder died in 2018. Although he was survived by his wife, the subsequent status of the micronation was unclear.

=== Italy ===
Italy
Flag	Year founded	Name	Description
flag	2011	Principality of Filettino	Created by the mayor of Filettino in protest at the Italian government's austerity measure that reorganised the local government of towns with less than 1,000 residents.
flag	1963	Principality of Seborga	Citing medieval documents, a resident of Seborga asserted that the town had been a sovereign state since 954 AD. Seborga does not claim to be exempt from Italian legal jurisdiction, however. Although the town's declaration that it is an independent nation is generally seen as a ploy to increase tourism, Seborga has been recognized by about twenty countries.

=== North Macedonia ===
North Macedonia
Flag	Year founded	Name	Description
flag	1991 and 2000	Republic of Vevčani	Eleven days after the secession of Macedonia (now named North Macedonia) from Yugoslavia, residents of the village of Vevčani almost unanimously voted, in turn, to become independent from Macedonia. The Macedonian government later allowed Vevčani to separate from Struga Municipality, and become a municipality of its own.

=== Sweden ===
Sweden
Flag	Year founded	Name	Description
flag	1963	United Republics of Jämtland, Härjedalen, and Ravund	The republics (Republic of Jämtland for short) base their claim of independence upon Jämtland's autonomy prior to 1178. Their objective is to promote Jämtlandic culture.
flag	1996	Royal Republic of Ladonia	Lars Vilks created two sculptures in the Kullaberg nature reserve. When the art was discovered, the local council ruled that it should be removed, resulting in a legal battle. After he lost in court, Vilks declared an area around his sculptures independent.

=== United Kingdom ===
United Kingdom
Flag	Year founded	Name	Description
flag	2008	Sovereign State of Forvik	Stuart "Captain Calamity" Hill squatted on Forewick Holm in Shetland. He declared it to be a Crown Dependency, claiming that Shetland had not been legally integrated into the United Kingdom after Christian I of Denmark pawned it to James III of Scotland in 1469.
flag	1276 and 1947	Free Borough of Llanrwst	Llywelyn ap Gruffudd, Prince of Wales, declared the town of Llanrwst a "free borough", and not part of the Diocese of Llanelwy. This royal privilege was successfully defended against reversal by the Catholic Church for some decades.
flag	1967	Principality of Sealand	Paddy Roy Bates took over HM Fort Roughs, a defunct Maunsell Fort built off the coast of Suffolk during World War II, and declared it an independent country. At the time, the fort was international waters. In 1978, Germany sent a diplomat to Sealand to negotiate with Bates for the release of a German citizen who claimed to be Sealand's prime minister, and had led a failed attack on the fort. Bates would thereafter claim that the dispatching of the emissary constituted recognition of Sealand by Germany. The purported prime minister set up a Sealand government in exile after being repatriated to Germany. In 1987, the United Kingdom extended its territorial waters, which now encompass Sealand.

=== United States ===
United States
Flag	Year founded	Name	Description
flag	1982	Conch Republic	Frustrated by a United States Border Patrol checkpoint on the only road into Key West, Florida, the city's leaders, including mayor Dennis Wardlow, humorously declared Key West independent. The republic later expanded its territorial claims to include a nearby area on the Florida mainland.
—N/a	1998	Maritime Republic of Eastport	When Eastport temporarily was cut off from the rest of Annapolis, Maryland, by maintenance on a drawbridge, a group of residents of the neighbourhood declared it independent, as a way to promote business.
flag	1994	Kingdom of EnenKio	Mainly known as a front for financial fraud, this micronation claims as its territory Wake Island, a remote atoll in the Pacific Ocean that is a United States insular area, but is also claimed by the Marshall Islands. EnenKio has ties to Melchezidek (q.v.), another micronation.
flag	1974	Ganienkeh	A group of Native Americans of the Mohawk tribe occupied an area near Moss Lake, in New York State, claiming it to be part of a far larger territory that had been illegally acquired from indigenous Americans in 1797. After years of negotiations with the state, the group agreed to move to an area near Altona. Issues of sovereignty remain unresolved.
flag	1977	Republic of Molossia	This micronation existed only as a concept until its founder, Kevin Baugh, bought land in Nevada in 1998. The micronation was featured as the setting for Doug Walker's 2010 film "Kickassia" where Kevin Baugh played a fictional version of himself and primary opponent of Walker's YouTube persona the Nostalgia Critic. Molossia's leader, Kevin Baugh, also servers an influential role in MicroCon as the event's creator and has even hosted "MicroCon 2015" in Southern California.
—N/a	c.1965	Most Serene Federal Republic of Montmartre	This republic, retroactively dated to 1636, encompasses the Theater District in the borough of Manhattan in New York City. In the late 1970s, a dispute between Montmartre's founder and New York Telephone, over whether the micronation could be listed in the government pages of the phone book, ended up in front of the New York Public Service Commission. The commission vacillated, alternately issuing rulings in favour of each party, and listings for the republic did appear in at least a few editions of the New York Telephone book.
—N/a	2021	United Territories of the Sovereign Nation of The People's Republic of Slowjamastan	A micronation in Imperial County, Southern California that was founded by slow jam DJ Randy Williams. It claims an empty, 11-acre plot of desert land along the California State Route 78 that Williams purchased for $19,000.
flag	2005	Zaqistan	This micronation claims a small area in Utah.

=== Uruguay ===
Uruguay
Flag	Year founded	Name	Description
flag	1878	Republic of Parva Domus Magna Quies	This social organization declared itself an independent country. A residence in the Punta Carretas neighbourhood of Montevideo, and the plot of land on which the building sits, constitute the micronation's territory.

=== Other ===
Flag	Year founded	Name	Description
flag	1987	Aerican Empire	An eccentric tongue-in-cheek micronation. It claims various terrestrial and interplanetary territories.
flag	2016	Space Kingdom of Asgardia	Igor Ashurbeyli founded Asgardia, which has the objective of creating a colony in orbit that is an independent country. Under the Outer Space Treaty, no nation may lay claim to territory in space. A number of smaller countries are not parties to this treaty, however. Asgardia launched a small satellite in 2017, and claimed the space occupied by it as the micronation's territory. The satellite re-entered the atmosphere and burnt up in 2022, as was expected.
flag	2008	Empire of Austenasia	Austenasia purports to be a successor to the Roman Empire. It was founded in a house, which now serves as the micronation's capital, in Sutton, a borough of Greater London, United Kingdom. Austenasia's claimed territory has been extended to other small properties around the world as new citizens have joined the micronation.
flag	1992	Elgaland-Vargaland	This conceptual art project was created by Carl Michael von Hausswolff and Leif Elggren. The micronation claims international borders as its territory, as well as other "interstitial territories" such as Limbo, and counts all dead persons as its citizens. In 2007, Elgaland-Vargaland claimed to have annexed Isola di San Michele, in the Venetian Lagoon.
	2000	Global Country of World Peace	Maharishi Mahesh Yogi, the founder of Transcendental Meditation, established this "country without borders for peace-loving people everywhere." It has made several unsuccessful attempts to create sovereign territory in recognized countries by offering financial compensation to their governments or to local residents. The micronation's currency has gained some limited acceptance. As of 2023, the GCWP is led by Tony Nader.
flag	2015	Free Republic of Liberland	Vít Jedlička founded this micronation, which claims part of the land on the disputed border of Serbia and Croatia. Access to the area asserted to be Liberland is mostly controlled by Croatia. YouTube host Niko Omilana visited the land in April 2023. There are approximately 20 Liberland citizens on the territory as of August 2023.
	1990	Dominion of Melchizedek	This source of financial fraud claims several Pacific islands, as well as a portion of Antarctica that has not been claimed by any recognized country, comprising most of Marie Byrd Land. (Two other micronations, Talossa and Westarctica, q.v., have also asserted control of this area in the Antarctic.) Melchezidek had possibly been recognized by the Central African Republic.
flag	1998	Nova Roma	Nova Roma is an organization that seeks to recreate a "classical Roman" society. It subscribes to ancient Roman religion, holds competitions and re-enactments, and mints its own coinage. It is considered by some to be a micronation.
flag	1973	Nutopia	John Lennon and Yoko Ono founded this "conceptual country", partly as a satirical response to the United States government's attempt to deport Lennon. Nutopia "has no land ... only people", and anyone may declare himself a citizen.
Flag of the Ambulatory Free States of Obsidia	2015	Ambulatory Free States of Obsidia	Founded by American artist Carolyn Yagjian, Obsidia is a self-proclaimed mobile feminist micronation and conceptual art project. Rather than claiming fixed territory, it defines its territory as two portable pieces of obsidian and has been described as using micronationalism as a form of artistic and political expression advocating gender equality and LGBTQ rights.
flag	1979	Kingdom of Talossa	An American teenager in Milwaukee, Wisconsin, created this micronation, the territory of which was initially limited to his bedroom. It has since expanded into part of Milwaukee, as well as other locations on Earth (including Marie Byrd Land, which is also claimed by two other micronations, Melchezidek and Westarctica; q.v.). Talossa's founder claims to have invented the term micronation as well. Although Talossa was disestablished by its founder in 2005, it nevertheless continues to exist, due to the continued efforts of its citizens. The micronation is notable for having its own invented language, which has an extensive vocabulary.

== Former ==
=== Australia ===
Australia
Flag	Years of existence	Name	Description
flag	1978–1996	Sovereign Humanitarian Mission State of Aeterna Lucia	The founder of Aeterna Lucia, who claimed to have been made a baron by an exiled king of Afghanistan, declared his property in New South Wales a sovereign country. He moved twice within New South Wales, taking his micronation with him. He was charged with fraud in 1990, but the case was eventually dropped.
flag	1976–c.2000	Province of Bumbunga	Alarmed by the possibility of Australia becoming a republic, a monarchist declared his farm in Bumbunga, South Australia an independent state loyal to the Crown.
flag	2004–2017	Gay and Lesbian Kingdom of the Coral Sea Islands	In protest of the national government's refusal to recognize same-sex marriages performed elsewhere in the world, a group of gay rights activists declared the Coral Sea Islands independent. The micronation counted all gay and lesbian people worldwide as permanent residents and eligible for citizenship. In 2017, the Australian government agreed to legalize same-sex marriage if a majority of voters responding to an official survey supported it. The results were in favour of legalization. Its objective having been achieved, the kingdom was dissolved.
flag	1970–2020	Principality of Hutt River	During a dispute with the Western Australia government over its limits on wheat production, Leonard Casley declared his sizable farm an independent province, though he remained loyal to Queen Elizabeth II. The micronation persisted for decades. Casley's son and heir, Graeme Casley, contending with a massive debt to the Australian Taxation Office as well as the impact of the COVID-19 pandemic, finally dissolved the principality.
(Note: The principality adopted all four of these flags.)	1993–1993	Principality of Marlborough	Facing repossession of two properties near Marlborough, Queensland, that he owned, the founder of this micronation declared them an independent country. Although he had about 30 supporters, he and his family were forcibly evicted by police eleven days later.
—N/a	1979-mid–1980s	Independent State of Rainbow Creek	At least thirty farmers were engaged in a dispute with the government of Victoria over flood damage to their farms, and taxes. One was inspired by the Hutt River Province (later the Principality of Hutt River, q.v.) to secede from Victoria. Like Hutt River, Rainbow Creek retained its loyalty to the Crown.

=== Brazil ===
Brazil
Flag	Years of existence	Name	Description
flag	1893–1895	Principality of Trinidad	James Harden-Hickey claimed the uninhabited southern Atlantic island of Trindade, which did not belong to any nation. Two years later, the United Kingdom declared that the island was its territory, ignoring Harden-Hickey's claim. The British annexation of Trindade was disputed by Brazil, which ultimately would take possession of the island.

=== Canada ===
Canada
Flag	Years of existence	Name	Description
flag	1997–2000	Kingdom of L'Anse-Saint-Jean	By referendum, the citizens of L'Anse-Saint-Jean, Quebec, chose to declare the municipality a "municipal monarchy", as a way to promote tourism.
flag	1949–1973	Principality of Outer Baldonia	The owner of one of the Tusket Islands in Nova Scotia established this micronation centred around recreational fishing.
flag	2005–2018	Kingdom of Vikesland	A television news cameraman founded Vikesland in order to make a documentary about it and other micronations. It claimed his residence in Brandon, Manitoba, as well as a nearby property that he owned jointly, as its territory.

=== Croatia ===
Croatia
Flag	Years of existence	Name	Description
—N/a	1992–2010	Republic of Peščenica	As part of his television chat show Nightmare Stage, Željko Malnar declared an independent republic, located in Stara Peščenica, a neighbourhood of Zagreb.

=== Germany ===
Germany
Flag	Years of existence	Name	Description
—N/a	1990–1993	Bunte Republik Neustadt	This micronation existed in Dresden.
flag	1989	Rüterberg	This village declared itself independent. One day later, the Berlin Wall fell, and Rüterberg became part of a reunified Germany.
symbol, no flag	1980	Free Republic of Wendland	At a site that was planned to be tested for suitability for storing radioactive waste, about 5,000 activists established a protest camp and set up a micronation. They were forcibly evicted 32 days later.

=== Indonesia ===
Indonesia
Flag	Years of existence	Name	Description
flag	2018–2020	Keraton Agung Sejagat	The co-founder of the Keraton claimed that an agreement 500 years earlier between the Majapahit Empire and the Portuguese Empire gave him dominion over the entire Earth. He would later admit that the micronation was a fraudulent enterprise.
flag	2003–2020	Sunda Democratic Empire	The founder of the Sunda Empire claimed to be the successor of Alexander the Great, ruling over a swath of territory extending from Australia to South Korea. He and two other leaders of the micronation were arrested and imprisoned in Indonesia for disseminating false information.

=== Italy ===
Italy
Flag	Years of existence	Name	Description
flag	1968–1969	Republic of Rose Island	A platform was built just outside of Italian waters for the purpose of creating this micronation. The republic did not sit well with the Italian government, which quickly seized and destroyed the platform.
—N/a	2008–2009	Republic of Malu Entu	Sardinian separatists took over the island of Mal di Ventre, off the coast of Sardinia, and declared it independent.

=== Jamaica ===
Jamaica
Flag	Years of existence	Name	Description
flag	1964–1966	New Atlantis	Ernest Hemingway's brother Leicester established this micronation on a raft anchored off the coast of Jamaica, with the objectives of conducting a democratic experiment and researching marine life. He claimed that the barge qualified as an island under the Guano Islands Act, and he designated half of it United States territory. He lived on the raft for a time with his family and two staff, and planned to build an artificial island on the site, but the barge was destroyed during a storm.

=== New Zealand ===
New Zealand
Flag	Years of existence	Name	Description
flag	1980–1981	Independent State of Aramoana	A small New Zealand community that declared itself independent to protest the building of an aluminium smelter on nearby land.

=== Nigeria ===
Nigeria
Flag	Years of existence	Name	Description
—N/a	1970–1977	Kalakuta Republic	In protest of Nigeria's military dictatorship, musician and activist Fela Kuti declared his property in Lagos independent. Kalakuta contained the residences of Kuti's family and band members, and his recording studio. The compound was attacked and destroyed by the Nigerian military several years later.

=== Tanganyika ===
Tanganyika
Flag	Years of existence	Name	Description
flag	1959–1980	Sultanate of M'Simbati	In what was then Tanganyika, the founder of this micronation declared his property independent, and proclaimed himself sultan.

=== Tonga ===
Tonga
Flag	Years of existence	Name	Description
flag	1972–1982	Republic of Minerva	In its first bid to establish a libertarian state, the Phoenix Foundation began building an artificial island on the Minerva Reefs. This alarmed countries in the vicinity, which mutually agreed that Tonga would claim the atolls. A decade later, the leader of the Republic of Minerva made a second unsuccessful attempt to take possession of the reefs.

=== United Kingdom ===
United Kingdom
Flag	Years of existence	Name	Description
flag	1811–1816	Islands of Refreshment	Jonathan Lambert occupied, renamed, and declared himself ruler of the remote archipelago Tristan da Cunha, in the southern Atlantic. He and two of the other three inhabitants of the largest island drowned five months later, but the surviving resident and two men who joined him continued to live there. The United Kingdom annexed Tristan da Cunha several years later, to pre-empt its use by France or the United States.
flag	1977–1980s	Frestonia	In the London borough of Hammersmith, a community of squatters, which counted some prominent writers, musicians, and other artists among its members, was facing eviction. Inspired partly by the micronation Freetown Christiania, the residents voted to secede. In a dispute over the performance of a play, a British court ruled that, for the purposes of that particular lawsuit, Frestonia was not part of the United Kingdom.
flag	2004–2013	Kingdom of Lovely	In the television series How to Start Your Own Country, Danny Wallace investigates the subject of micronations, and starts one of his own. Lovely claimed Wallace's East London flat as its territory.
flag	1997	Global State of Waveland	Greenpeace took the island of Rockall in protest against the oil research activities organized under British rule. On June 15, the island was declared independent as the "Global State of Waveland". The occupation lasted 42 days in total.

=== United States ===
United States
Flag	Years of existence	Name	Description
flag	1997–2004	Principality of Freedonia	A group of college students envisioned a libertarian state, but were never able to acquire territory other than the leader's home in Boston, Massachusetts.

=== Other ===
Flag	Years of existence	Name	Description
flag	1877 or 1946-1990s	Republic of Morac-Songhrati-Meads	This micronation, also known as the Kingdom of Humanity, claims the Spratly Islands, an archipelago in the South China Sea which is the subject of a territorial dispute between several recognized countries as well.
flag	1948–1970	Nation of Celestial Space	Prior to the existence of the Outer Space Treaty, James T. Mangan claimed "all space in all directions from the Earth" in order to prevent a terrestrial country from dominating space.
—N/a	1956–1974	Free Territory of Freedomland	The founder of Freedomland claimed dominion over the Spratly Islands. He eventually signed them over to the Philippines.
—N/a	1968–1973	Operation Atlantis	An American soap company owner attempted to create a libertarian nation. After gathering a group of interested people, he made multiple unsuccessful attempts to construct a small area in the Caribbean above sea level, suitable for habitation.

== Proposed ==
Flag	Date	Name	Description
flag	1995	New Utopia	New Utopia would be a complex built on the Misteriosa Bank in the Caribbean Sea. The U.S. Securities and Exchange Commission took action against the project's founder for fraudulently soliciting investments.
flag	2011	Russian Empire	Anton Bakov proposed a state named the Russian Empire, which would be a successor to the original Russian Empire, and consist of supposedly Russian territories that had never been integrated into the Soviet Union. Bakov renamed the micronation the Imperial Throne in 2014, and renounced all previous territorial claims. He then attempted to acquire various locations, and state recognition, for the Imperial Throne, which he once again renamed as the Romanov Empire in 2016. As of 2020, Bakov's project is in yet another iteration, called Arca Noë, and involves the construction of artificial islands in the Mediterranean Sea.

== Intermicronational organizations ==
Flag	Founded	Name	Description
Link to flag	2008	Antarctic Micronational Union	AMU is an intermicronational organization that aims to regulate micronational claims in Antarctica. The purpose of the AMU is to protect the claims of its members against other claimants.
flag	2016	Organisation de la microfrancophonie	Organisation de la microfrancophonie is an intermicronational organisation that aims to promote French-speaking (Francophone) micronations in communities in France and increase intermicronational cooperation. Founded in 2015 and based on the Organisation internationale de la Francophonie, Microfrancophonie accepts micronations as member states, and has hosted four intermicronational summits between these members.

== See also ==
- Flags of micronations
- How to Start Your Own Country
- Micronations: The Lonely Planet Guide to Home-Made Nations
