= Organisation de la microfrancophonie =

Organisation for French-speaking micronations

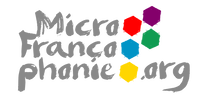
- Flag Logo
- Official languages: French
- Type: Intermicronational organisation
- Membership: 27 member states; 1 observer

Leaders
  - General-Secretary: Dominic Desaintes
  - High Commissioner: Jean-Pierre IV

Establishment
  - Founded: 2015; 11 years ago
  - Charter signed: 27 May 2016; 10 years ago
- Website microfrancophonie.org

The Organisation de la microfrancophonie (OMF; English: Organization of the Microfrancophonie; (Note: Clipping of micronation and Francophonie) shortened to Microfrancophonie) is an intermicronational organisation that aims to promote French-speaking (Francophone) micronations in communities in France and increase intermicronational cooperation. Founded in 2015 and based on the Organisation internationale de la Francophonie, Microfrancophonie accepts micronations as member states, and has hosted four intermicronational summits between these members. As of August 2024, Microfrancophonie had 27 member states plus one observer.

== Summits ==
The first summit was held in Aigues-Mortes, Occitania, between 23 and 24 September 2016, hosted by the Principality of Aigues-Mortes. According to organiser and self-proclaimed head of state of the Principality Jean-Pierre Pichon (dubbing himself Prince Jean-Pierre IV): "The role of this first summit of micronations is to introduce the public to this fundamental movement intended to engage citizens in social, environmental and cultural actions." The second summit took place in Vincennes, Paris, on 21 July 2018, and was hosted by the Empire of Angyalistan. It had fifteen attendees. A coinciding exhibition for the summit at a local museum hosted micronational passports, currencies, newspapers and other local productions. The third summit took place in Blaye in Nouvelle-Aquitaine, between 27 and 28 August 2022. It was organised by the Principality of Hélianthis, and had fifteen attendees representing seven member states of Microfrancophonie. The fourth summit was held in Saint-Antoine-l'Abbaye in Auvergne-Rhône-Alpes on 24 and 25 August 2024 upon invitation by the Formori Community. Thirty-five delegates attended, representing thirteen member states of Microfrancophonie and five non-members.

== Members ==
Organisation de la microfrancophonie has the following members:

Flag	Name	French name
Current members
	Iroisian Empire of Armorica	Empire iroisien d'Armorique
	Seigniory of Auxiliaum	Seigneurie d'Auxiliaum
	Duchy of Bardo	Duché de Bardo
	Principality of the Baobabs	La Principauté des Baobabs
	Principality of Deux-Acren	Principauté de Deux Acren
	Dibistan	Dibistan
	Kingdom of Dracystan	Royaume de Dracystan
	Kingdom of Hope	Royaume de l'Espoir
	Principality of Ferthroy	Principauté de Ferthroy
	Principality of Hélianthis (Note: Founding member)	Principauté d'Hélianthis
	Republic of Jaïlavera	République du Jaïlavera
	Juclandia	Juclandie
	Grand Duchy of Kuragon	Grand-Duché de Kuragon
	Independent State of New Troi	État indépendant de Nova Troie
	Anacratic Republic of Pardhom	République anacratique du Pardhom
	Neugraviat of Saint-Castin	Neugraviat de Saint-Castin
	Principality of Surland	Principauté de Surland
	Republic of Toubak	République de Toubak
Current observers
	Formori Community	Communauté fomoire
Former members
	Independent and Sovereign Principality of Bérémagne	Principauté indépendante et souveraine de Bérémagne
	Principality of Aigues-Mortes	Principauté d'Aigues-Mortes
	Empire of Angyalistan	Empire d'Angyalistan
	Principality of Anthophilia	Principauté d'Anthophilia
	Principality of Austrasie	Principauté d'Austrasie
	Autonomous Republic of Europa	République autonome d'Europa
	Grand Duchy of Flandrensis	Grand-duché de Flandrensis
	Territories of Frya-Nordland	Territoires de Frya-Nordland
	Kingdom of Navassa	Royaume de la Navasse
	State of Sandus	État de Sandus

== See also ==
- MicroCon—biannual micronational convention
