= Robert Motum =

Canadian playwright and theatre creator

- Born: 1991 (age 34–35); Oshawa, Ontario
- Education: PhD, Theatre and Performance Studies, University of Toronto
- Occupations: Playwright, researcher
- Known for: Expertise on micronations, site‑specific performance
- Website: robertmotum.com

Robert Motum is a Canadian playwright and theatre creator. He is noted for his background in site-specific performance and for his academic research into micronations.

== Personal life and education ==
Motum was born in 1991 in Oshawa, Ontario. He attended the University of Waterloo for his BA in Drama and Aberystwyth University for his MA in Practising Performance. He recently completed a PhD in performance studies at the University of Toronto and currently teaches at the Rotman School of Management.

== Theatre career ==
As a site-specific theatre practitioner, Motum has a history of staging new theatrical work outside of purpose-built auditoriums. His 2013 play, Transience, was staged on an active Grand River Transit city bus as it circled its loop of Kitchener-Waterloo. He has since staged work in public parks, in a Queen Street art gallery, inside a vacant Target store, in a castle, throughout the streets of Hamilton, Ontario, and in augmented reality. His work has been supported by the Stratford Festival, the Ellen Ross Stuart Opening Doors Award, Outside the March and others.

His verbatim play, A Community Target, is based on interviews with over 60 former employees of Target Canada and recounts the dramatic collapse of the retailer in the country. Staged inside a vacant Target store in Hamilton, Ontario, the piece garnered national and international media attention.

== Academic scholarship ==
Motum has written about the ethics of site-specific performance and verbatim theatre for various academic publications including the Canadian Theatre Review and Theatre Research in Canada. He is also a leading academic expert on micronations, having written extensively on their performative enactments of sovereignty and identity. His research—featured in Digital Society, The Routledge Companion to Cultural Texts and the Nation, and The Drama Review—positions micronations as critical interventions in statecraft and citizenship. He has presented at international conferences, including MicroCon, and has appeared in documentaries on the topic.
