= Ambulatory Free States of Obsidia =

Micronation and conceptual art project

- Micronation (unrecognized entity)
- Flag of the Ambulatory Free States of Obsidia

- Claimed land Briefcase area
- Location: Portable territory
- Area claimed: Two pieces of obsidian
- Claimed by: Carolyn "Karo" Yagjian
- Dates claimed: March 8, 2015–present
- Website www.obsidiagov.org

Ambulatory Free States of Obsidia (commonly known as Obsidia) is a self-proclaimed micronation and conceptual art project founded on 8 March 2015 by American artist Carolyn "Karo" Yagjian.

Obsidia is a mobile feminist micronation whose territory consists of portable pieces of obsidian rather than a fixed geographical area. It is usually stored and transported in a briefcase owned and carried by Yagjian. It has been described as a feminist and anti-nationalist project that uses micronationalism as a form of artistic expression and political activism, particularly in support of gender equality and LGBTQ rights.

== History ==
The Ambulatory Free States of Obsidia was founded on 8 March 2015 by the American artist Carolyn Yagjian as a feminist conceptual art project and self-proclaimed micronation. Established on International Women's Day, it was conceived as a portable state whose territory consists of two pieces of obsidian rather than a fixed geographical area.

Obsidia has been described as promoting feminism, anti-nationalism and anti-capitalism through micronationalism, advocating gender equality and LGBTQ rights. Representatives of Obsidia have participated in international micronational conventions, including MicroCon 2017, where Yagjian discussed the micronation's opposition to conventional concepts of borders and nationhood.

== Government ==
Obsidia is headed by its founder, Carolyn "Karo" Yagjian, who holds the title of Grand Marshal. The micronation's government is composed of women and queer people, reflecting its stated feminist and egalitarian principles.

== Symbols ==
Former flag of Obsidia (2015–2021)

The flag of Obsidia consists of a blue field bearing a map of the obsidian claimed territory inside of a pink compass rose, representing mobility and freedom of movement as a portable micronation. On March 8, 2021, Yagjian updated the flag design by replacing the compass arrows with crosses resembling the Venus symbol.
