= Principality of Aigues-Mortes =

Micronation in Europe

- Micronation (unrecognized entity)
- Location: 43°34′03″N 4°11′36″E
- Area claimed: Aigues-Mortes in southern France
- Claimed by: Sovereign-Prince Jean-Pierre IV
- Dates claimed: 21 June 2010–present
- Website www.principaute-aigues-mortes.com/english

The Principality of Aigues-Mortes (French: Principauté d'Aigues-Mortes) is a micronation that claims the city of Aigues-Mortes. It is not recognised by any country or government.

Aigues-Mortes was founded in 2010 as a humorous parody of the Principality of Monaco, to gain media attention and boost tourism. The micronation is also registered in France as the organisation LOUPAM. Together with local merchants and the tourist office of Aigues-Mortes, it created the BPAM (Bourse princière d'Aigues-Mortes) to handle currency exchange with the local currency, the flamant.

Aigues-Mortes has been present at several international conferences on micronations, in Perugia (2015), Aigues-Mortes (2016), Atlanta (2017) and Vincennes (2018).

== Legitimizing claims ==
The founders of the micronation invented their own legend to legitimize their claims. The legend is a humoristic story about Pierrot Pitchoun, a squire of the French king. In 1240, Louis IX of France obtained the town and the surrounding lands by exchange of properties with the monks of the abbey to whom the city belonged so far. Aigues-Mortes was the city from which Louis IX twice departed for the Seventh Crusade in 1248 and for the Eighth Crusade in 1270, during which he died of dysentery at Tunis. According their story the dying king granted his faithful squire the title Prince of Aigues-Mortes, the squire's hometown, as a reward for faithful service during his last days. The current Prince is Jean-Pierre IV who is purported to be the 22nd of this princely line.

== See also ==
- Aigues-Mortes
- List of micronations
- Flags of micronations
