= Kingdom of Vikesland =

Former micronation in Manitoba, Canada

- Unrecognized micronation
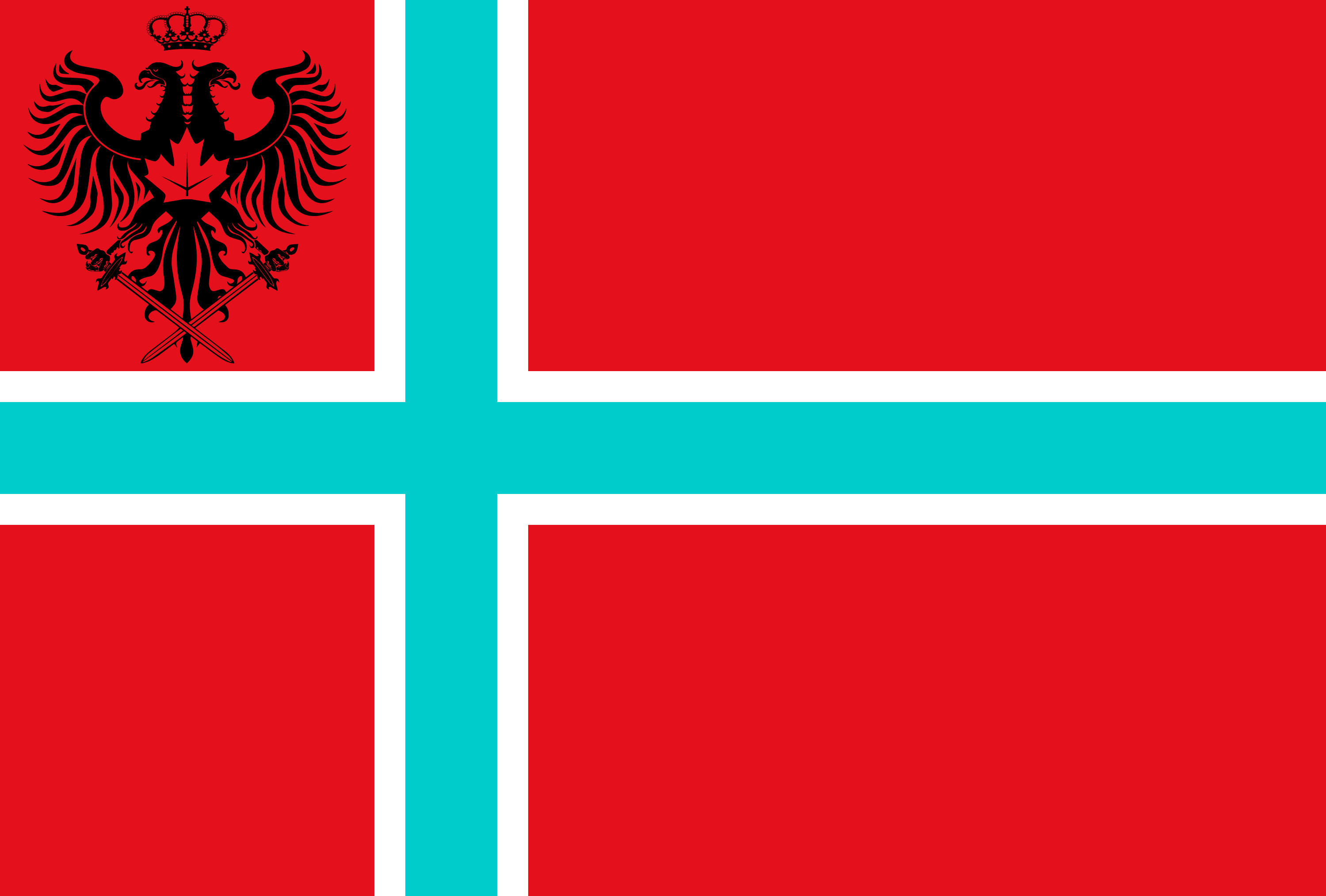
- Claimed by: Christopher Beyette
- Dates claimed: 2005–2018
- Area claimed: 6.5 square kilometres (2.5 mi^{2})
- Location: Property around Brandon, Manitoba, Canada

The Kingdom of Vikesland was a micronation in Manitoba, Canada. It was founded in 2005 by Christopher Barry Joseph Beyette (King Christopher I), a television news cameraman employed by the CHUM network.

== History ==
Vikesland's creation and subsequent development was the intended focus of a documentary film about micronations which Beyette planned to produce. The focus of the micronation's activities subsequently shifted to unspecified endeavors of a charitable and humanitarian nature. In addition to this, Vikesland began building a reputation among the micronational community. This stemmed from the state's various interactions with other micronations; notably the Grand Duchy of Westarctica and the attendees of MicroCon 2015.

During its existence, Vikesland received a small amount of media coverage. Most stories made about the micronation were lighthearted in fashion and highlighted Vikesland (in addition to other states) as examples of the greater micronational movement as a whole.

The official website of Vikesland stated that the micronation was "not secessionist" and had no intention of claiming the territory of Canada or any other sovereign state.

However, the site also identifies Beyette's place of residence near the city of Brandon, as well as a nearby 6.5 square kilometre rural property which he co-owns with his parents, as being "Vikeslandic territory". The latter was referred to as the "Royal Ranchlands".

According to the official website, Vikesland (as a kingdom) was dissolved in April 2018. Recent edits to the site indicated an intent to revive the project as the "Jarldom of Vikesland" sometime in the Spring of 2019, however no further updates were made, and the website is no longer operable, as of December 2019.

== Flag ==
The kingdom's original flag was made up of three horizontal bars of black, white and red, in style of that of German Empire. At the center of the white bar it had a white, Albanian-style double-headed eagle.

On 25 January 2015, King Christopher officially changed the flag of Vikesland to that of a single pure-red background decorated by a white and (light) blue Nordic cross. In addition the flag sported a black German-style double-headed eagle on the top left corner with a red Maple leaf in its center.

== See also ==
- List of micronations
