= Republic of Molossia =

Micronation in North America

Republic of Molossia Molossia
- Micronation (unrecognized entity)
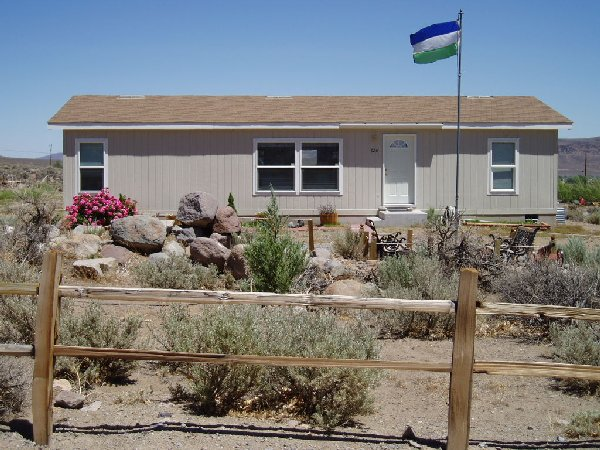
- Government House of Molossia

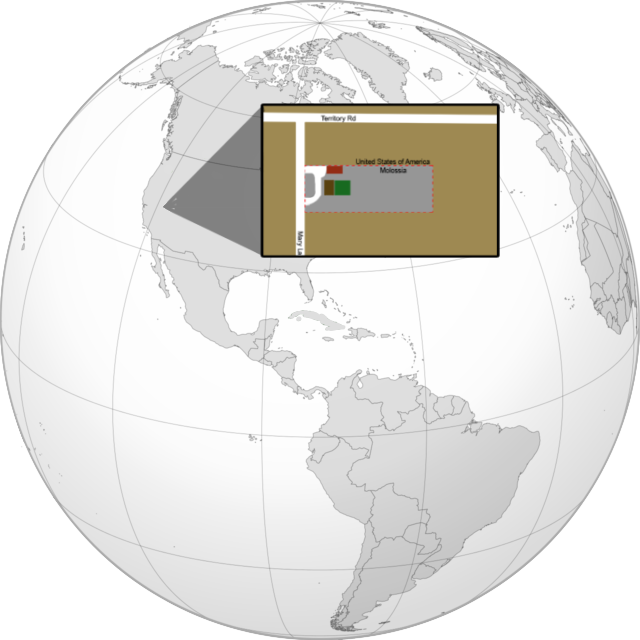
- Location of Molossia
- National anthem: "Fair Molossia is Our Home"
- Location: Near Dayton, Nevada, United States; 39°19′22″N 119°32′23″W
- Area claimed: 11.3 acres (4.6 ha; 46,000 m^{2})
- Capital: Baughston
- Official language: English, Esperanto
- Currency: Valora, cookie dough
- Type: Unitary presidential republic under a military dictatorship
- Claimed by: Kevin Baugh
- Dates claimed: May 26, 1977–present
- Website www.molossia.org

Molossia (/moʊˈlɒsiə/), officially the Republic of Molossia, is a micronation claiming de facto sovereignty over 11.3 acres (4.6 ha; 46,000 m^{2}) of land near Dayton, Nevada, United States. The micronation has not received recognition from any of the 193 member states of the United Nations. It was first conceived by Kevin Baugh in 1977, before its official creation in 1998. He continues to pay property taxes on the land to Storey County, the recognized local government, although he calls it "foreign aid". He has stated, "We all want to think we have our own country, but you know the United States is a lot bigger."

== History ==
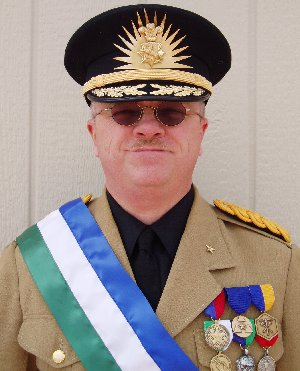
Kevin Baugh, President of the Republic of Molossia.

Molossia started as a teenage dream of Kevin Baugh, and began as the Kingdom of Molossia in 1998, when he bought the land in Nevada. Baugh has claimed that he based the idea of Molossia on the film The Mouse That Roared, and also claims influence from his time in the military. At one time it was known as the Grand Republic of Vuldstein, where Kevin Baugh was the Prime Minister and his friend, James Speilman, was declared King James I. It went through several government and name changes, including the People's Democratic Republic of Molossia, Kingdom of Zaria and the United Provinces of Utopia.

Flag of Molossia

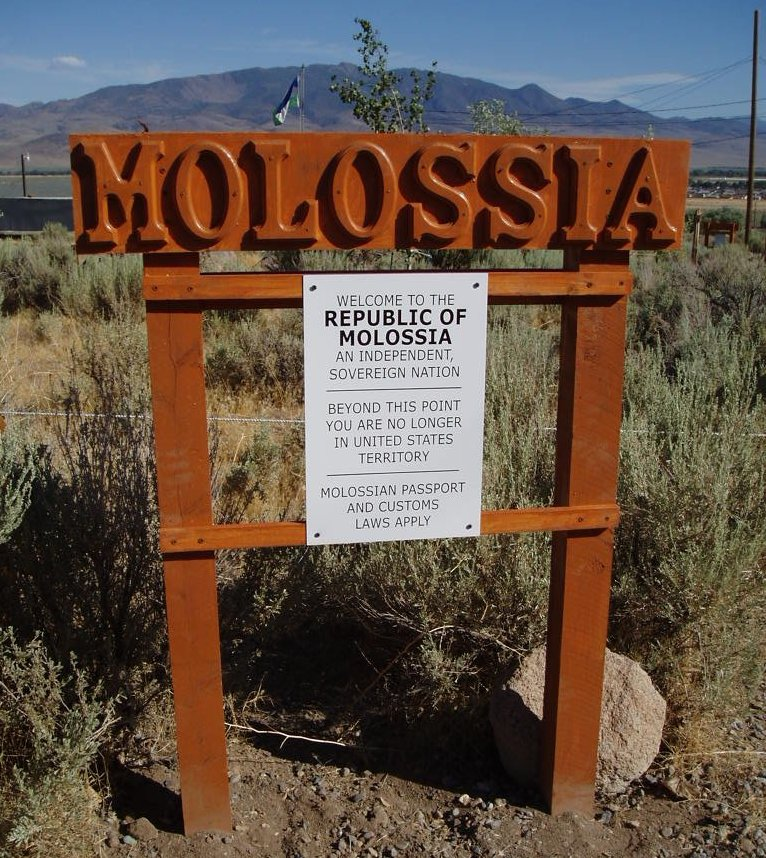
A marker along the Molossia–Nevada border

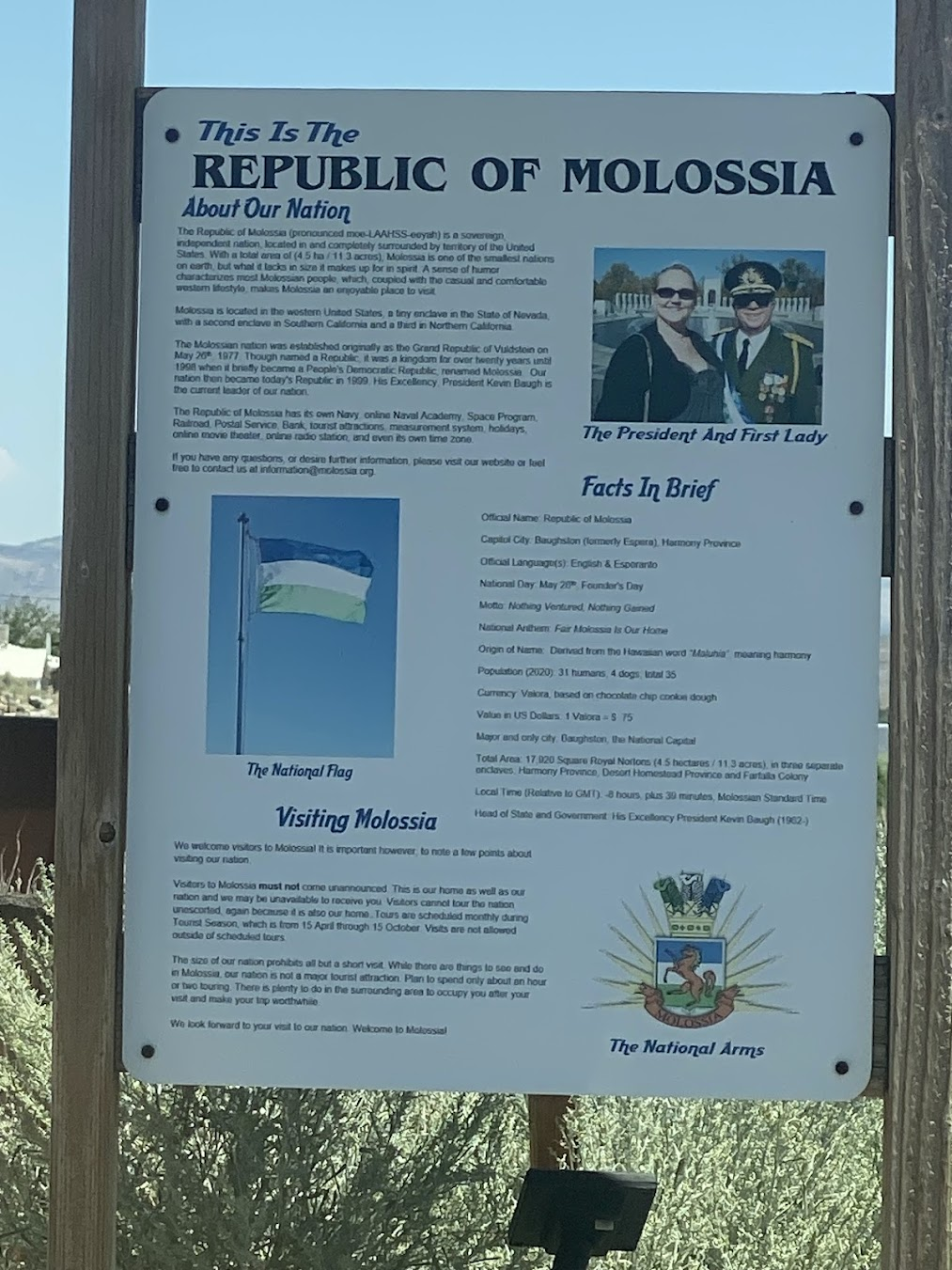
Information Board in the Republic of Molossia

The Republic of Molossia claims to be at war with the former Communist state of East Germany, alleging that they are responsible for military drills performed by Kevin Baugh while stationed with the U.S. military in West Germany, which had caused his resulting diagnosis of sleep deprivation. While East Germany formally ceased to exist in 1990 following the Treaty on the Final Settlement with Respect to Germany, Molossia argues that Ernst Thälmann Island, dedicated by Fidel Castro to Weimar German politician Ernst Thälmann and given to East Germany, as well as its lack of mention in the Treaty on the Final Settlement or by the nation of Cuba, is therefore still East German land, allowing the war to continue.

== Flag ==
The flag of the Republic of Molossia, called the Grand Triune, is a rectangle with a blue stripe on the top, a white stripe on the middle and a green stripe on the bottom. The blue bar symbolizes strength and the desert sky; the white bar symbolizes purity and the mountains; the green bar symbolizes both prosperity and the Molossian landscape. It is the flag of Sierra Leone flipped upside-down.

== Culture ==
=== Environmental care ===
Plastic bags and incandescent lightbulbs are banned in the Republic due to their effect on the environment. Catfish and walruses are also banned due to their non-presence in the micronation whatsoever.

=== Laws ===
Detonating any nuclear device inside of the nation will result in a 500 Valora fine (400 USD). It is against the law to play percussion instruments inside of bathrooms, and sunshine is guaranteed for all.

=== Anthem ===
The national anthem of the Republic of Molossia is Fair Molossia Is Our Home. The music was composed by the Catholic priest Simon-Pierre Boka (who composed the national anthems for Zaire and the Democratic Republic of the Congo) and lyrics were written by the president of Molossia.

=== Cuisine ===
The signature, national drink of Molossia is called the Molossolini, a non-alcoholic mixed drink of Sprite, grenadine, and pineapple juice, with added cherries and slices of banana, orange, and pineapple.

Onions and spinach are banned food items inside of Molossia due to the President disliking them.

== Currency ==
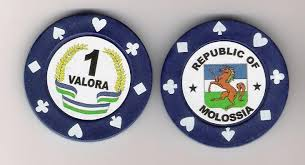
One-valora coins

The Valora (issued by the Bank of Molossia) is divided into 100 Futtrus and denominations of 1, 5, 10, 20 and coins in 1, 5, 10, 30 (plastic); it has a fixed exchange rate of 0.80 USD to one Valora.

== In popular culture ==
In 2010, the Republic of Molossia was in a feature-length special by Channel Awesome called Kickassia, with Baugh playing a fictionalized version of himself. In the film, the Republic undergoes an invasion by the Nostalgia Critic (played by Doug Walker) and his posse of reviewers, who briefly took over Molossia with a dictatorship, "Kickassia", before being ousted. The official website for the Republic of Molossia treats the events of the film as factual.

== See also ==
- List of micronations
- MicroCon
- Micronations: The Lonely Planet Guide to Home-Made Nations
