= Grand Duchy of Flandrensis =

Micronation in The Antarctic Region

- Unrecognized micronation
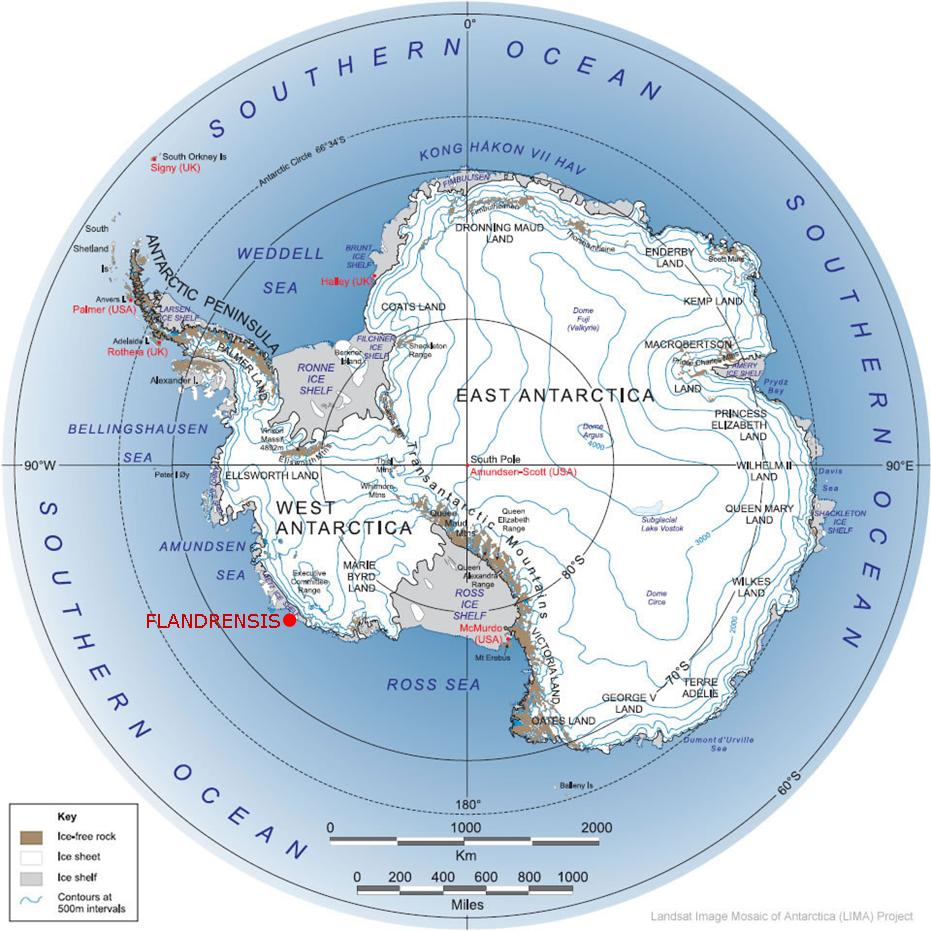
- Claimed by: Niels Vermeersch
- Date claimed: 4 September 2008
- Area claimed: Marie Byrd Land

The Grand Duchy of Flandrensis (Dutch: Groothertogdom Flandrensis) is a micronation with claims over some territories of Antarctica, which was founded in 2008 by the Belgian Niels Vermeersch. Flandrensis is not recognised by any country or government, nor is it their intention to get diplomatic recognition. Since 2021 the micronation is registered in Belgium as the environmental non-profit organization “vzw Groothertogdom Flandrensis”.

== History ==
The Grand Duchy of Flandrensis was founded on September 4, 2008 as a temporary hobby for two weeks. The micronation is inspired by the medieval County of Flanders (Pagus Flandrensis). Flandrensis was regarded by the founder first as a hobby-micronation, and later as an ecological venture, to raise awareness of ice melting and climate change. Since 2021 the micronation is also an environmental non-profit organization.

The micronation has its own identity cards, currency, heraldry, newspaper, constitution, national anthem and football team.

Until 2014, Flandrensis was partly a political simulation, with political parties and organised yearly elections. Professor Alastair Bonnett of the University of Newcastle described Flandrensis as an example of a micronation that is inspired by a city council in which young people learn to make decisions.

In 2021 the micronation was composed of 741 citizens from 71 different nationalities. Outside of the internet, the activities of Flandrensians were restricted to the region around Roeselare, but the official embassy is now located in the West-Flemish town Sint-Juliaan.

Flandrensis was represented at several international conferences on micronations, such as Polination London (2012) and Perugia (2015), and the MicroCon conventions in Atlanta (2017) and Las Vegas (2022). In August 2023 Flandrensis hosted the first European edition of MicroCon in Ypres, Belgium along with the Royal Republic of Ladonia.

In May 2022 the founder was invited as a speaker at ChangeNow, an international climate summit in Paris to talk about Flandrensis and environmental micronationalism.

On November 25, 2025, Flandrensis adopted a new flag, replacing their flag that had existed since the creation of Flandrensis.

== Territory ==
Flandrensis claims five islands off the coasts of West Antarctica: Siple Island, Cherry Island, Maher Island, Pranke Island and Carney Island. Flandrensis is regarded by the founder as an ecological venture, to raise awareness of ice melting, hereby Niels Vermeersch was one of the first who introduced the concept of environmental micronationalism. Flandrensis does not intend to visit its claimed territories and portrays itself as the only country in the world that does not want any humans on its land.

== Non profit organization ==
On August 12, 2021, Flandrensis was registered in the Belgian Official Journal as “vzw Groothertogdom Flandrensis”. In the published bylaws Flandrensis describes itself as an environmental non-profit organization that focuses on climate change and Antarctica, using the concept of micronationalism to draw attention to the climate in a creative way. Some of their projects are climate letters and clean-up actions. The Grand Duchy of Flandrensis is among 1000+ non-governmental organizations that have received United Nations Environment Programme accreditation.

== Language ==
In 2024, the creation of a constructed language named Flandriaans, based mainly on Dutch and English, was announced, as well as the establishment of the “Komjesi vor Åna ov Flandriaans Langåfrega (KÅFL)”

== Gallery ==
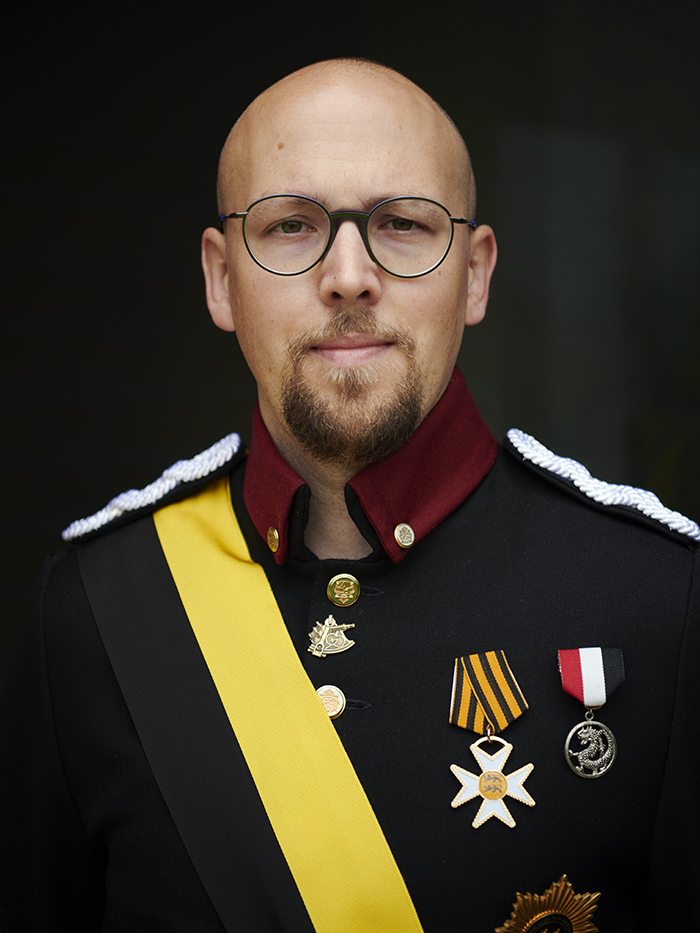
Niels Vermeersch

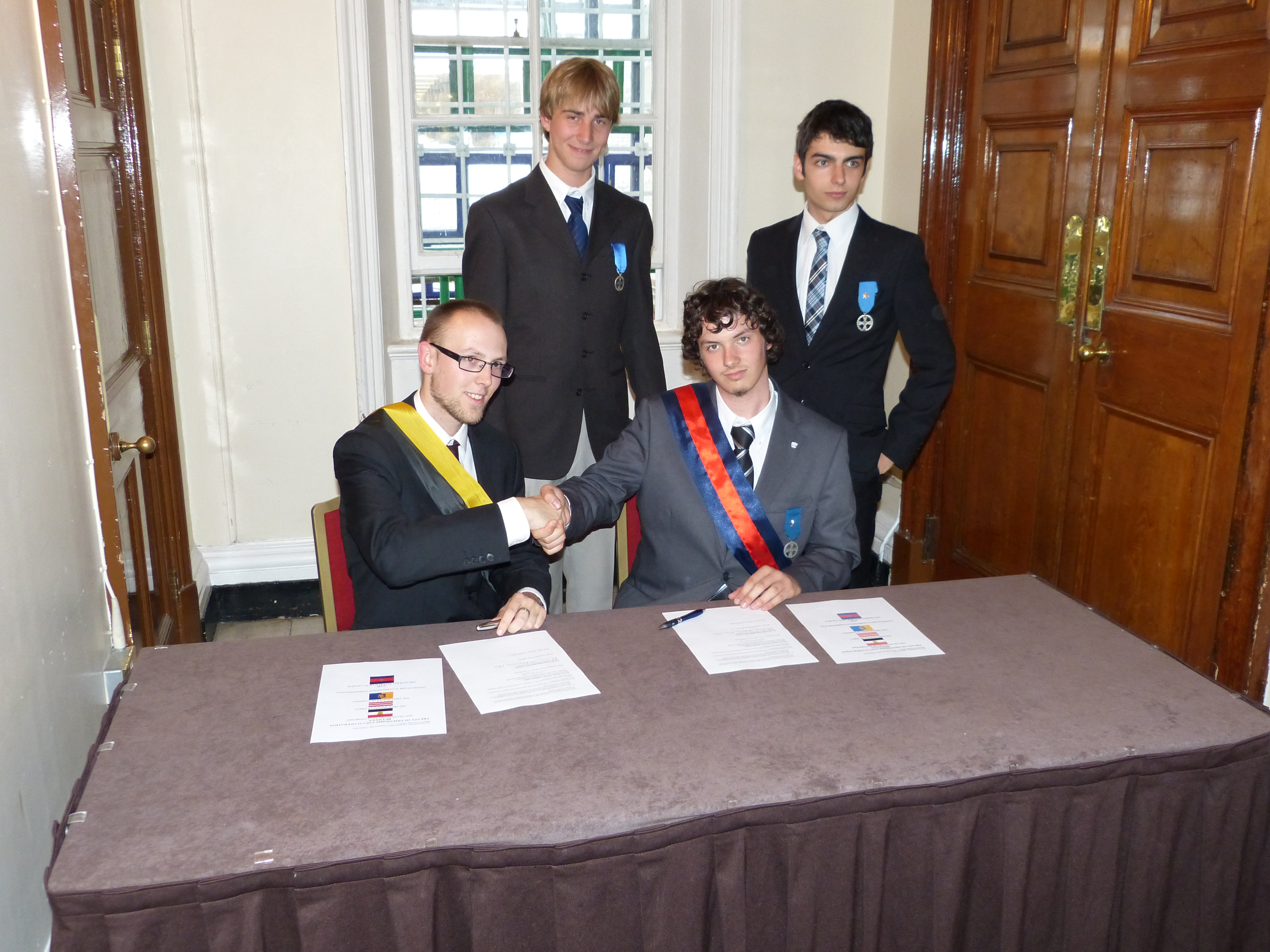
Signing of a treaty between Flandrensis and the Republic of St. Charlie at Polination (2012)

Logo of the National Football Association of Flandrensis

Flag of Flandrensis (2008-2025)

Flag of Flandrensis (2025-present)

== See also ==
- List of micronations
- Flags of micronations
- List of Antarctic territorial claims
