= Principality of Freedonia =

Defunct micronation

- Unrecognized micronation
- Claimed by: John Kyle
- Date established: 1997
- Area claimed: None

The Principality of Freedonia was a micronation based on libertarian principles. It was created as a "hypothetical project" by a group of teenagers in the United States in 1992. The project was formalized as a new country project in 1997, which included attempts in 2001 to lease territory in Somaliland. The attempt to lease land was rejected.

It was headed by a Texas university student named John Kyle, who used the title Prince John. The Principality of Freedonia itself was based in Boston, Massachusetts.

== Coinage ==
While the Freedonia project was active, it minted its own currency. It had a number of 50 Freedonian dollar 1 oz silver coins minted. It offered these coins for sale on the organization's website.

== Current status ==
The Freedonia project's website has not been updated for a number of years and its discussion forum no longer functions, e-mail communication with the self-styled Prince does not work, and the entire project appears to be defunct. E-mail statements from the founder indicate the project is not being actively pursued as of 2004.

As of 2013, the Freedonia website is no longer available.

== See also ==
- List of micronations
- Freedonia § Use in general English
