= Westarctica =

Micronation in Antarctica

- Formation: December 12, 2014; 11 years ago
- Legal status: 501(c)(3) non-profit
- Members: 5000 (2018)
- Official language: English, German
- Owner: Travis McHenry
- Website: www.westarctica.info

Westarctica is a United States non-profit advocating for climate action, and an unrecognised micronation in Antarctica. As a non-profit, it is registered in Sacramento, California, and officially named Westarctica Incorporated. As a micronation, it claims the 1,600,000 km^{2} (620,000 sq mi) area of Marie Byrd Land in Antarctica, and is formally the Grand Duchy of Westarctica. Apart from having its own flag, coat of arms, and currency (the Ice Mark), it holds non-consultative status with the NGO branch of United Nations Department of Economic and Social Affairs, and hosted MicroCon 2022 in Las Vegas. It also offers an annual research scholarship, paid for by James P. Howard, in the fields of climate change and conservation. As of 2018, it had over 5000 members, which it referred to as citizens.

It was founded in 2001 as the Protectorate of Westarctica by Travis McHenry, a U.S. Navy intelligence specialist who had just read from the CIA World Factbook that no sovereign state laid claim to Marie Byrd Land. Despite writing letters to many different countries over the years, none, except other micronations, have recognized Westarctica's sovereignty. In 2004, he began distributing fantasy passports as souvenirs, but soon stopped after discovering that a Kenyan scammer was reselling them to refugees, claiming they were legal travel documents. By 2006, McHenry's superiors had learned he was communicating with foreign nations, and told him he would have to quit either his job in the navy, or his involvement with Westarctica. In order to keep his job, he abdicated and passed the title of Grand Duke to his friend Philip Karns.

Three years later, having left the navy, McHenry decided to get back into micronationalism, founding a new micronation called Calsahara. It was eventually incorporated into Westarctica, and he regained the position of Grand Duke in 2010. In 2014, Westarctica was registered as a non-profit organization. Since then, it has been active helping to raise awareness about the impact of climate change on the wildlife of Antarctica and has also spoken on the need for an effective global response to COVID-19. It is a part of the People's Climate Movement. McHenry has since tried to encourage other micronations to also register as non-profits. While planning a trip to Antarctica, the Russian Arctic and Antarctic Research Institute gave the organization permission to use one of its abandoned research stations. In 2018, Joachim Aldfinger, an electric vehicle designer and member of Westarctica, established an honorary consul for the micronation in Nerja, Spain.

== 2025 embassy scam ==
In July 2025, it was reported that the Indian police had arrested Harsh Vardhan Jain for running a fake embassy of Westarctica from a rented house in Ghaziabad. For 7 years he pretended to be a diplomat for micronations like Westarctica, Ladonia, and Seborga. To look official, he used expensive cars with fake diplomatic number plates, fake documents, and edited photos showing him with Indian leaders. When the police searched his house, they found a large amount of money, foreign money, fake passports, fake stamps, and items linked to money laundering. Jain is also accused of offering fake jobs abroad and setting up fake business deals. As of 25 July 2025, police are still investigating the full extent of the scam.

In a statement, Westarctica acknowledged that Jain had been serving as its "Consul-General to India", while asserting that the Westarctica "diplomatic number plates" and passports reportedly found in his possession could only be unauthorized versions created on his own initiative. It further stated that Jain "has been removed from our roster of diplomatic representatives and will also face sanction from the Crown as a member of the Peerage", and that Westarctica was "cooperating fully with the legal authorities in India".

== Gallery ==
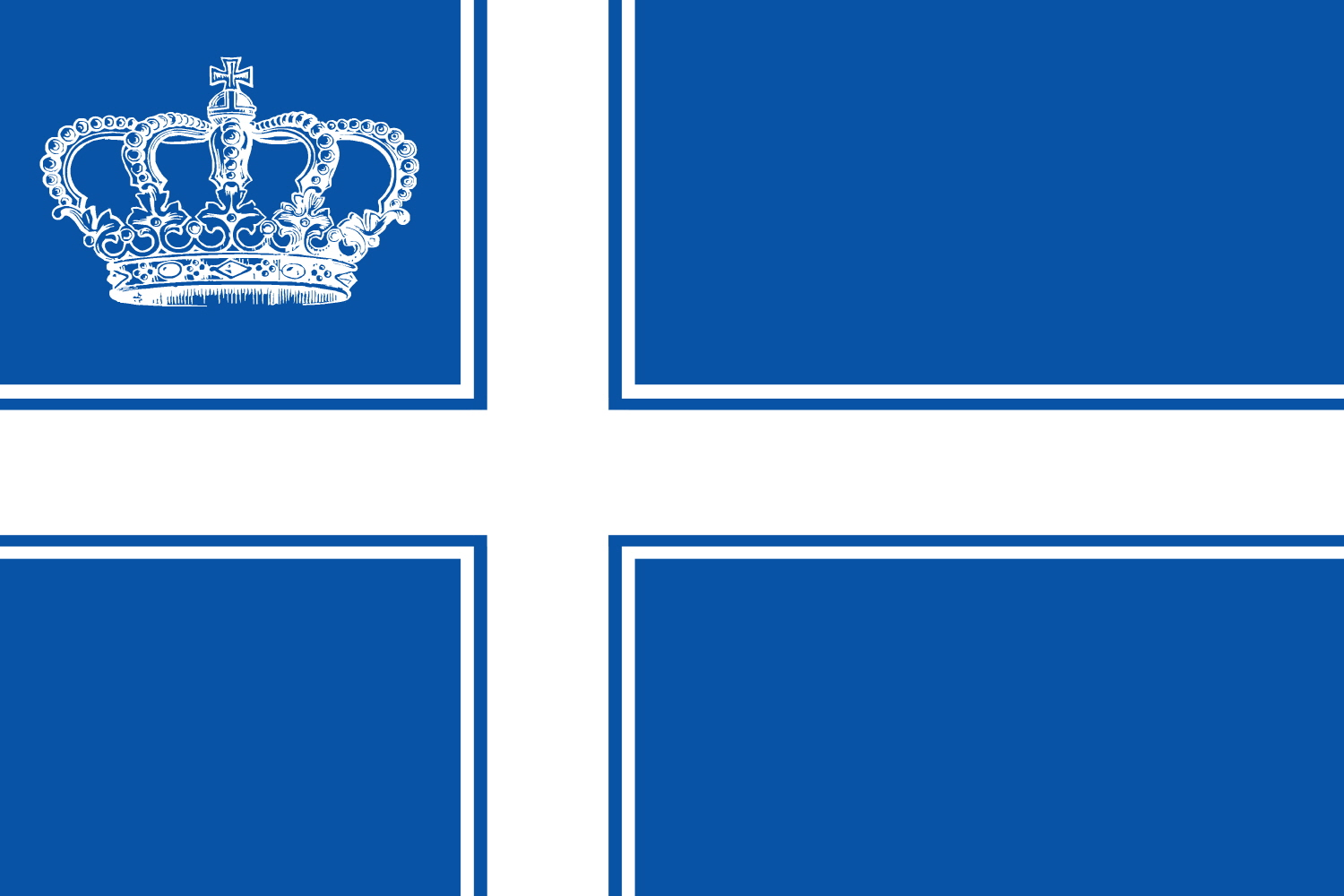
Flag

Coat of arms

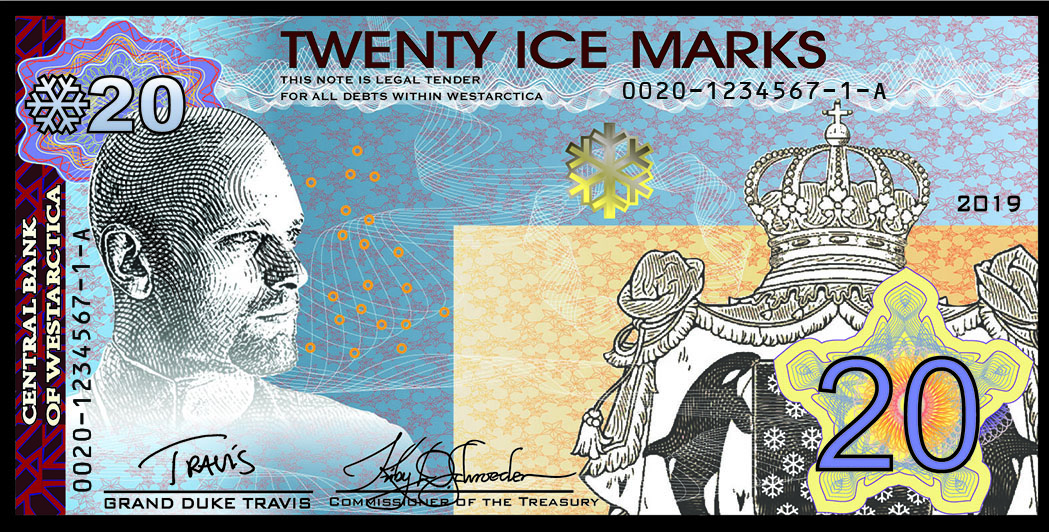
Westarctican Ice Mark

Map of Westarctican claims

== See also ==
- List of micronations
- Flags of micronations
- Territorial claims in Antarctica
