= Holy Empire of Reunion =

Micronation on Réunion Island

- Micronation (unrecognized entity)
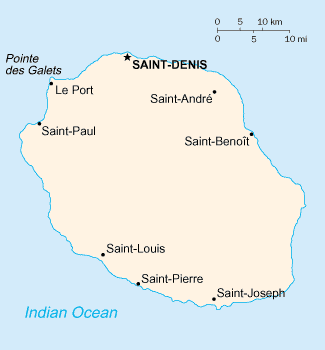
- Réunion island
- Location: Department of Réunion, France
- Area claimed: 2,511 km^{2} (970 sq mi)
- Claimed by: Law students
- Dates claimed: 28 August 1997–unknown

The Holy Empire of Reunion (Portuguese: Sacro Império de Reunião) is a micronation that was founded on 28 August 1997 as a political and constitutional simulation.

== History ==
It claims the territory of the French marine department of Réunion Island. Its creators were students of the Law School of the Pontifical Catholic University of Rio de Janeiro.

The micronation has been mentioned in media.

== See also ==
- List of micronations
