= Aerican Empire =

Micronation in Canada

- Flag of the Aerican Empire
- Capital: Montreal, Quebec
- Official languages: English
- Demonym: Aerican

Government
  - Emperor: Eric Lis

Area
  - Total: 750,503 km^{2} (289,771 sq mi)

Population
  - Census: 200

The Aerican Empire (/əˈɛrɪkən/ ə-ERR-i-kən; French: Empire aéricain), conventionally referred to in short form as Aerica (/əˈɛrɪkə/ ə-ERR-i-kə), is an unrecognized self-proclaimed monarchy in Canada, founded in May 1987 for humor purposes. Its name stems from the term "American Empire". In 2000 The New York Times described its website as "one of the more imaginative" micronation sites.

== History ==
The Aerican Empire was founded on May 8, 1987 by Canadian Eric Lis and a group of friends. For the first ten years the Empire was almost completely fictional, claiming sovereignty over a vast galaxy of feigned planets and engaging in wars against other micronations (although never resulting in physical contact). In 1997, the Empire created its own website.

In 2007, Aerica first issued "novelty passports." The first issued passport was exhibited in the Palais de Tokyo 2007 Micronational art exhibition. Aerica issued stamps for the first time in 2015.

== Status ==
The project's mission statement is: "The Empire exists to facilitate the evolution of a society wherein the Empire itself is no longer necessary." It describes itself as having a parliamentary system, with various elected bodies and offices, under the oversight of an Emperor (currently the founder, Eric Lis). Lis, who founded the Aerican Empire as a child, obtained his M.D., C.M. from McGill University.

The group's activities are permeated by a great deal of humour and a love of science fiction and fantasy, with recurrent references to Star Wars, The Hitchhiker's Guide to the Galaxy, and similar works. Annually, the Empire holds story-writing contests, role-playing and wargaming days, and such events as the Dog-Biscuit Appreciation Day Scavenger Hunt. It also developed a religion called Silinism, the worship of the Great Penguin; originally intended as a joke, but which the group says has thirty practitioners worldwide. It has holidays and "niftydays" (such as Saint Bill's Day, "honoring the ultimate nerd" and Topin Wagglegammon, "the Niftiest Day of the Year").

== Offline activities ==
Delegations from the Aerican Empire were in attendance at the Polinations academic conference in London in 2012 and the MicroCon micronations convention in Atlanta in 2017. Aerica was also represented at MicroCon 2023 in Joliet, Illinois.

In 2025, the Aerican Empire hosted MicroCon 2025 at Ruby Foo's hotel in Montreal, which was attended by 120 participants from 48 micronations.

== National symbols ==
Their flag is similar to the flag of Canada, with a yellow smiling face instead of the red maple leaf in the white square (although the red rectangles on the sides have different side length ratios).

== See also ==
- List of micronations
- Sovereign citizen movement
