= Sovereign State of Aeterna Lucina =

Micronation

- Micronation (unrecognized entity)
- Location: Byron Bay, Curl Curl, and finally Cooma, New South Wales, Australia
- Area claimed: 14 km^{2} (5.4 sq mi)
- Claimed by: Paul "Baron" Neuman
- Dates claimed: 1978–founder's death

The Sovereign State of Aeterna Lucina (also known as the Sovereign Humanitarian Mission State of Aeterna Lucina), was an Australian micronation. It was founded in 1978, and continued until the death of its founder.

The founder and "Supreme Lord" of Aeterna Lucina was German migrant Paul Neuman, who changed his name by deed poll to Paul Baron Neuman. He founded it when living in Byron Bay, and later moved it with him to Curl Curl in Sydney, and finally Cooma. He claimed to have received the title Baron Neuman of Kara Bagh from the exiled former king Hassan III of Afghanistan and also claimed to have been awarded hundreds of other honours, including professorships, Doctorates of Philosophy, and degrees in divinity. He sold at least one "knighthood", with Roland Bleyer reportedly purchasing one for A$1,900.

Aeterna Lucina came to public attention in 1990 when Neuman faced fraud charges in the New South Wales court system relating to land sale offences. The case involved A$144,000 and was eventually abandoned in 1992.

== See also ==
- List of micronations
