= Principality of Marlborough =

Micronation in Australia

- Unrecognised micronation
- Claimed by: George Muirhead
- Dates claimed: 1993
- Area claimed: Property near Marlborough, Queensland

The Principality of Marlborough was a short-lived micronation established in 1993 located at 22°30′18.19″S 149°9′6.45″E near Marlborough, Queensland, Australia, about 106 km (66 mi) north of Rockhampton.

== Flags ==
In 1993, George Muirhead declared himself to be the Duke of Marlborough and conducted a ceremony under four flags representing his ancestors five generations. The flags were the Australian flag, the Aboriginal flag, the Scottish flag and the United Nations flag.

Flag of Australia

Australian Aboriginal flag

Royal Banner of Scotland

Flag of the United Nations
