= Travis McHenry =

American micronationalist

- Born: United States
- Occupation: Publisher

Travis McHenry is an American-born micronationalist and occultist.

== Micronations ==
In 2001, while a seaman in the United States Navy, McHenry founded the micronation of Westarctica. In 2004, he appointed himself ruler of a territory of 620,000 square miles he called the Grand Duchy of Westarctica located, in the Marie Byrd Land region of Antarctica. He has said that this took advantage of an apparent loophole in the Antarctic Treaty System. In 2006, after learning that McHenry had been communicating with foreign governments asking them to recognize the nation, the Navy required him to abdicate. As of August 2018, Westarctica claims a population of 2,356 citizens (none of whom actually live there), and McHenry still calls himself its Grand Duke.

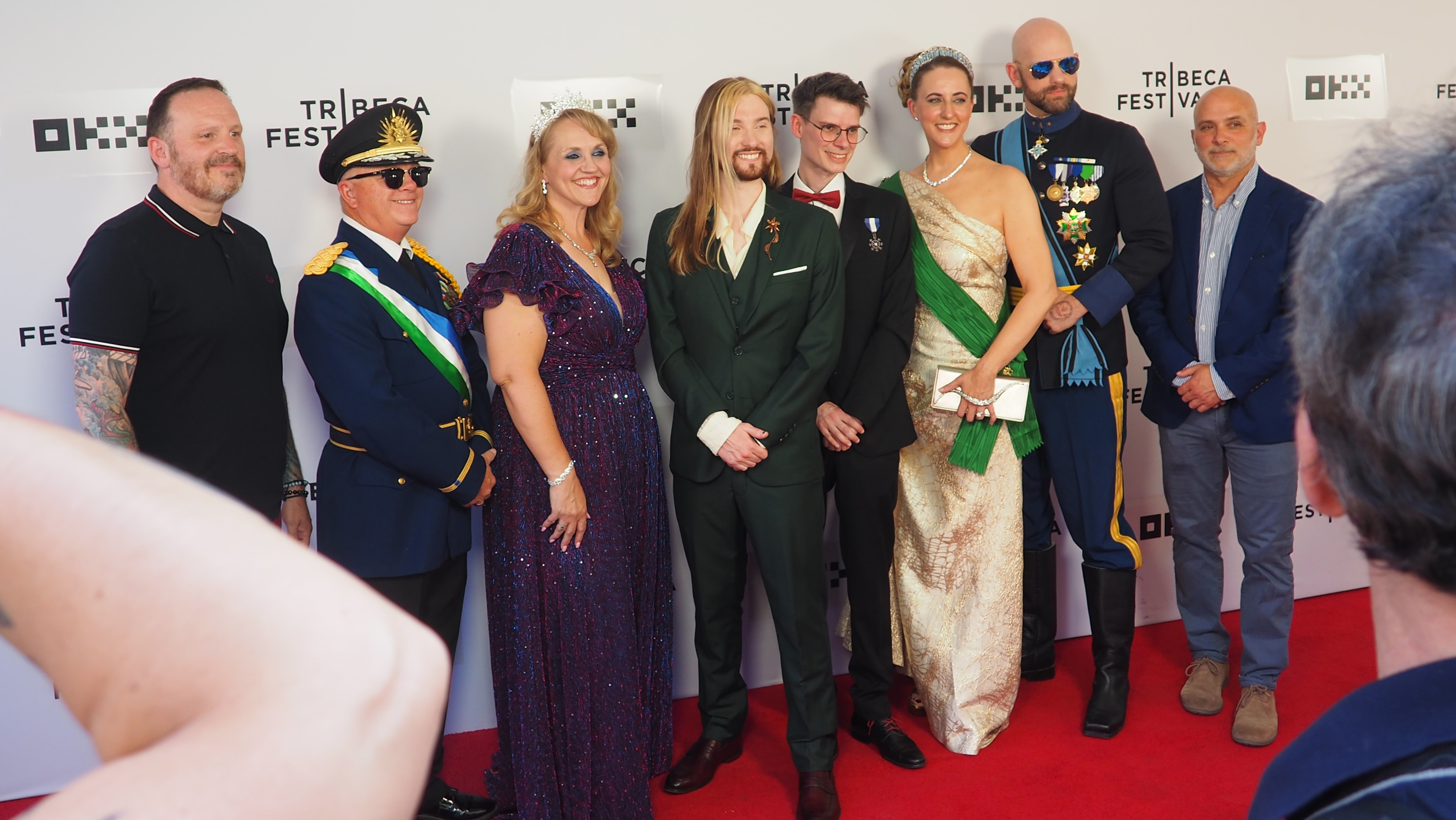
The director, cast (including McHenry), and producers of "Micronations" walk the Tribeca red carpet.

In 2009, after McHenry left the military, he acquired a few acres of rural desert land in Southern California from his family, and founded Calsahara. McHenry later expanded it to cover 117 acres. A 2015 profile in Los Angeles magazine described the project as good-natured. In October 2017, McHenry's two micronations were linked when Calsahara was "annexed" by Westarctica.

Sometime before 2011, McHenry changed the name of Westarctica from "Grand Duchy of Westarctica" to "Protectorate of Westarctica." In 2014, McHenry made Westarctica into a non-profit organization that advocates for protection of Antarctic wildlife and for the study of climate change.

== Occult and paranormal ==
McHenry publishes a line of tarot decks and other occult paraphernalia through his company Bloodstone Studios. He developed an interest in the occult in the 1990s and was allegedly initiated as a priest of Anubis. He has been offering his services as speaker on the occult specializing in demonology.

At some point in the early 2000s, McHenry was active in the Bigfoot community. His 2006 self-published book Into the Abyss: The Memoirs of a Paranormal Adventurer speculates about Bigfoot physiology. He calls the Patterson–Gimlin film, generally considered a hoax, the best photographic evidence for the existence of such a creature. He also goes over several well-known UFO cases, somewhat critically, and speculates they might be humans from the future.

== Acting ==
McHenry has taken acting classes at Orange Coast College and the Lee Strasberg Theatre and Film Institute.

Since 2007, McHenry has appeared as lead actor in short video productions (Life on Mars 2007, Richard and Anne 2013) and in smaller roles in feature films (uncredited role in Body of Lies 2008, Monster & Me 2013, Painkiller 2013), as well as in small television roles. He also produced and directed the television miniseries In the Footsteps of Vlad Dracula (2020).

McHenry also acted in theatre productions, notably in the 2023 production You Make me Physically Ill: Love Never Dies presented at the 2023 Hollywood Fringe Festival.

McHenry is also the author of a satire play entitled The Female of the Species (2005), self-published on Lulu Press, as well as Delusions of Grandeur (2010), about a family seceding from the United States so as to live under a king.
