= Glacier Republic =

Micronation

Glacier Republic República Glaciar
- Micronation (unrecognized entity)
- Location: Chilean Glaciers
- Claimed by: Greenpeace
- Dates claimed: 5 March 2014–present

The Glacier Republic (Spanish: República Glaciar) is a micronation created as an advertising awareness campaign by Greenpeace in Chile on March 5, 2014, in protest over mining corporations building on or near the glacier and causing it damage.

== Background ==
According to the activists, loopholes in the laws between the borders of Chile and Argentina and a legal vacuum in regulations regarding the sovereignty of glaciers allowed them to legally create the Republic. Chile contains 82% of South America's glaciers, but currently has no laws in place to protect them.

The activists say that once Chile has passed appropriate legislation recognizing and guaranteeing the integrity and protection of its glaciers, "the Glacier Republic and its citizens will return the glaciers to the Chilean State," and it will cease to exist.

Therefore, the purpose of the Republic is to force the Chilean government to take action in protecting its glaciers rather than to create a long-lasting country.

== History ==
Within its first ten days of "independence", more than 40,000 people signed up to become "citizens" in support of the Republic, which has already opened embassies in 40 countries around the world (essentially just those countries where Greenpeace International already have offices).

== Legal status ==
The statement of Greenpeace would invoke an apparent absence anomie or legal rule governing the legal status of the glacier is.

However, Article 593 subsection 2 of Chilean Civil Code states that:

"The waters inside the baselines of the territorial sea form part of the internal waters of the State"

Article 595 provides:

"All waters are national public goods'. On the other hand, the law 19,300 of Basic Environmental provides in art. 36, which form part of the protected areas "lots of sea, beach land, sea beaches, lakes, ponds, glacial, reservoirs, streams, swamps and other wetlands located within its perimeter".

Meanwhile, Regulation System of environmental impact assessment of Chilean State Decree No. 40 by SEIA published in the Official Chilean Gazette on August 12, 2013, without distinguishing between glaciers located within the National System of State Protected Wild Areas (SNASPE) or outside SNASPE expresses that:

"all projects in all its phases, the system must undergo Environmental Impact Assessment relate to when Dams, drainage, draining, dredging, or alteration defense, significant, bodies or natural watercourses, including 'glaciers' that are incorporated as such in a public inventory by the Directorate General of Water".

Expresses turn the holder of such activity or project must submit an Environmental Impact if your project or activity is located close to glaciers, may be affected, qualifying as Next area the area of influence of the activity; Thus, glaciers outside the SNASPE enjoy and exegete weighted analysis by various government agencies of the State of Chile that must issue a decision within the procedure System Environmental Impact Studies shall count the existence of such records by the owner in the presentation of this study, all prior to the authorization of a project or activity that might pose a risk to the glaciers.

Thus, there is no lack of recognition of Glacier as part of the territory of Chile.
