= Rüterberg =

Micronation in Germany

Coordinates: 53°09′N 11°11′E

Flag of the "village-republic" of Rüterberg

Rüterberg is a Stadtteil of Dömitz in the German state of Mecklenburg-Vorpommern.

The community lies in the former East Germany on a portion of the Elbe River that formed part of the border with the former West Germany. By the end of the communist era, Rüterberg was surrounded by a wall that completely cut the community off from the rest of East Germany. From 1988 to 1989, the local residents, led by Hans Rasenberger, raised the idea of creating a free town, with the powers of establishing their own laws, breaking their ties with East Germany. The "Republic" was proclaimed by an assembly of 90 citizens on 8 November 1989, just a day before the fall of the Berlin Wall. On 14 July 1991, the secretary of state of Mecklenburg-Vorpommern acknowledged the right of the people of Rüterberg to use the title of Dorfrepublik (Village Republic).

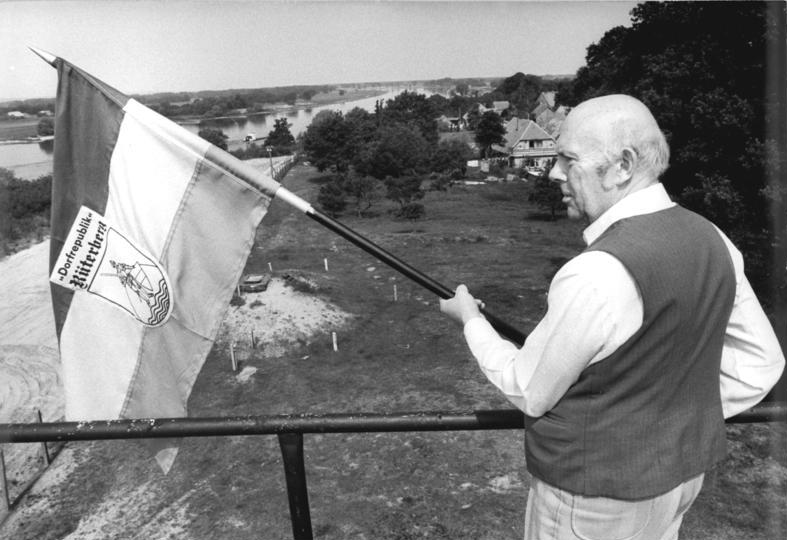
Bundesarchiv Bild 183-1990-0529-009, Dorfrepublik" Rüterberg
