= Principality of Islandia =

Micronation in the Caribbean Sea

Coordinates: 17°34′30″N 88°09′46″W

- Micronation (unrecognized entity)
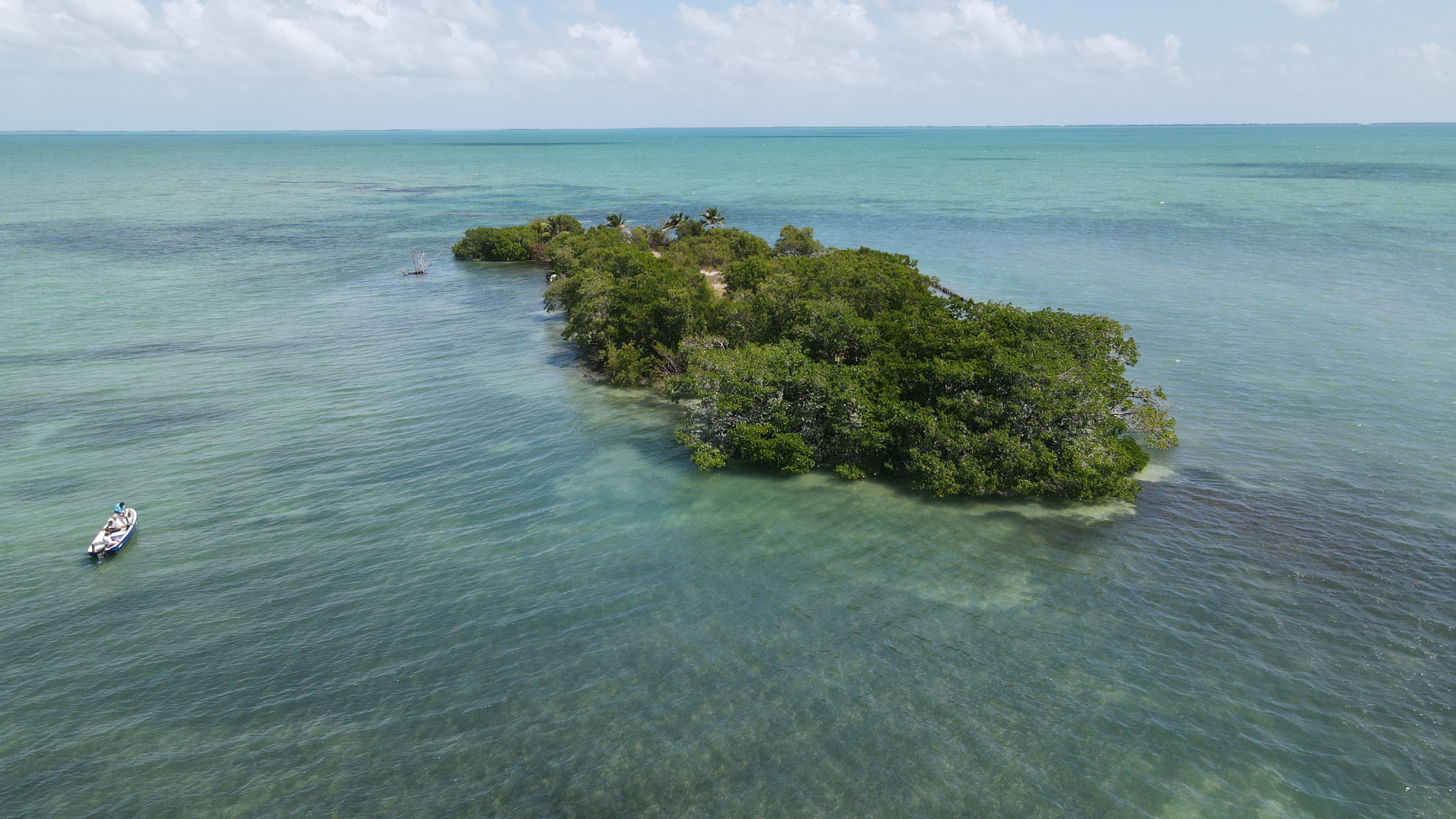
- Coffee Caye from the south

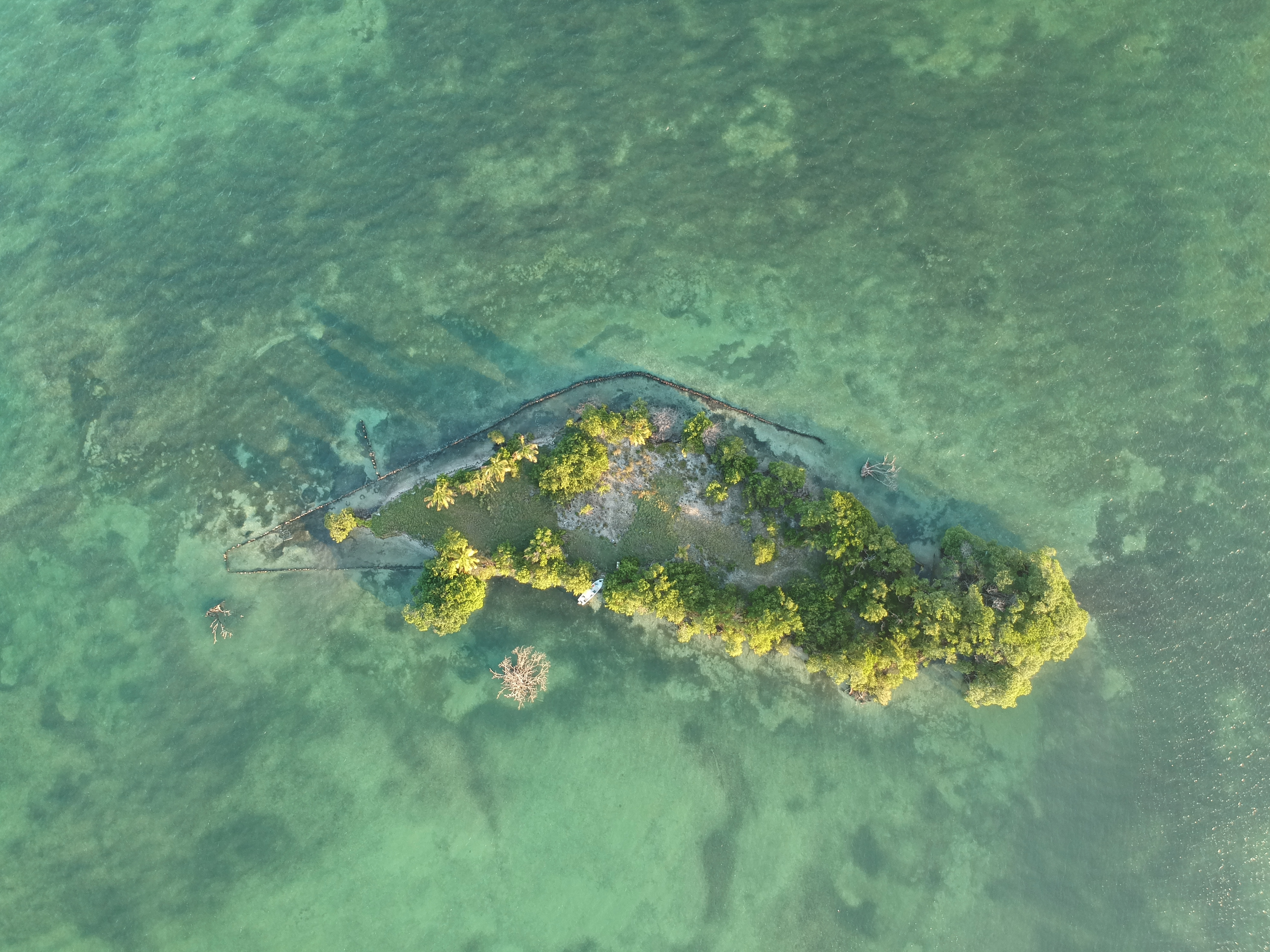
- Coffee Caye from above
- Area claimed: 0.005 km^{2} (0.0019 sq mi) Coffee Caye in the Caribbean Sea
- Claimed by: Jodie Joyce
- Dates claimed: February 11, 2018–present
- Website letsbuyanisland.com/principality-of-islandia

The Principality of Islandia is an incipient micronation that claims Coffee Caye in the Caribbean Sea off the coast of Belize as its territory. Coffee Caye is a currently uninhabited island of 1.2 acres (0.5 ha) separated by a short boat trip from Belize City. Founded in 2018 by Gareth Johnson and Marshall Mayer, the project is the first attempt to create a micronation to be crowdfunded. At present the island, which is covered in mangroves and surrounded by coral reefs, can be rented for camping excursions. The principality currently has around 250 citizens.
