= MicroCon =

Biennial conference of micronationalists

- Genre: Micronational
- Frequency: Biennial
- Country: Intermicronational
- Inaugurated: April 11, 2015
- Attendance: 132 (2023, Joliet, Illinois)
- Organizer: Micronational governments

MicroCon is a biennial summit or conference of micronationalists held in every other year since April 11, 2015. The event was created by Kevin Baugh of the Republic of Molossia, and every summit since has been hosted by a different micronation. MicroCon is a significant event in the micronational community, serving as a venue for exchanging ideas between micronationalists. The event has also been compared to the micronational equivalent of a session of the United Nations General Assembly. The largest edition, MicroCon 2019 in Hamilton, Ontario, Canada, had 113 attendees from 43 micronations. MicroCon 2023 was the first edition to consist of two separate events: an American summit in Joliet, Illinois, and a European summit in Ypres, Belgium.

== Overview ==
MicroCon is a biennial convention for micronationalists held since 2015. The event was created by Kevin Baugh, President of the Republic of Molossia. Micronations are political entities that claim independence and mimic acts of sovereignty as if they were a sovereign state, but lack any legal recognition. Many exist "only on the internet or within the private property of [their] members" and seek to simulate a state rather than to achieve international recognition; their activities are almost always trivial enough to be ignored rather than challenged by the established nations whose territory they claim. MicroCon is a significant event in the micronational community. A venue for exchanging ideas between micronationalists, MicroCon has been compared to a summit and dubbed the micronational equivalent of a session of the assembly of the United Nations.

== History ==
The first edition of MicroCon commenced on April 11, 2015 at the Anaheim Central Library in Anaheim, California. The event was organised and hosted by Baugh. Ongoings at the convention included presentations by attendees, a formal ball, and a trip to the nearby Disneyland. Various tables in the public rec room at the library displayed micronational regalia. Attendees were allowed to host presentations between 10–15 minutes long on their micronation or any micronational topic of their choosing; a laptop was provided and attendees hosting presentations were allowed to bring a compact disc or flash drive with their presentation material. One presentation included a choreographed battle performed by the nonprofit Lamia Knights of the Kingdom of Shiloh. A keynote address by micropatriologist Steven F. Scharff was delivered to the conference via YouTube. The ball held at the end of the convention, the MicroCon Cotillion, was semi-formal and commenced at the Unitarian Universalist Church in Anaheim. Sources for the number of attendees varies; (Note: The Independent reports an attendance of "more than 50 delegates".) though Bloomberg News, citing MicroCon 2015's official website, lists 36 attendees representing 17 micronations.

MicroCon 2017 commenced between June 23–25 in Reid H. Cofer Library at Tucker, DeKalb County, Georgia, and was attended by "more than 70 delegates" representing 26 micronations. (Note: MicroCon 2017's official website and Atlanta state 26 micronations, whereas Georgia Public Broadcasting and Vice News report 27 micronations.) Hosted by Queen Anastasia von Rubenroth of the Kingdom of Ruritania, events included sightseeing in Atlanta, bowling, a gala dinner, diplomatic conference, exchanging of micronational awards and presentations on micronationalism. Much of June 24 was spent on these presentations hosted on PowerPoint, ranging from jocular to academic in focus. Attendees dressed in full royal and military regalia: "in pearls and kitten heels, electric blue sailor suits, glitter-coated boots, and capes." Vice News produced a short documentary on the convention.

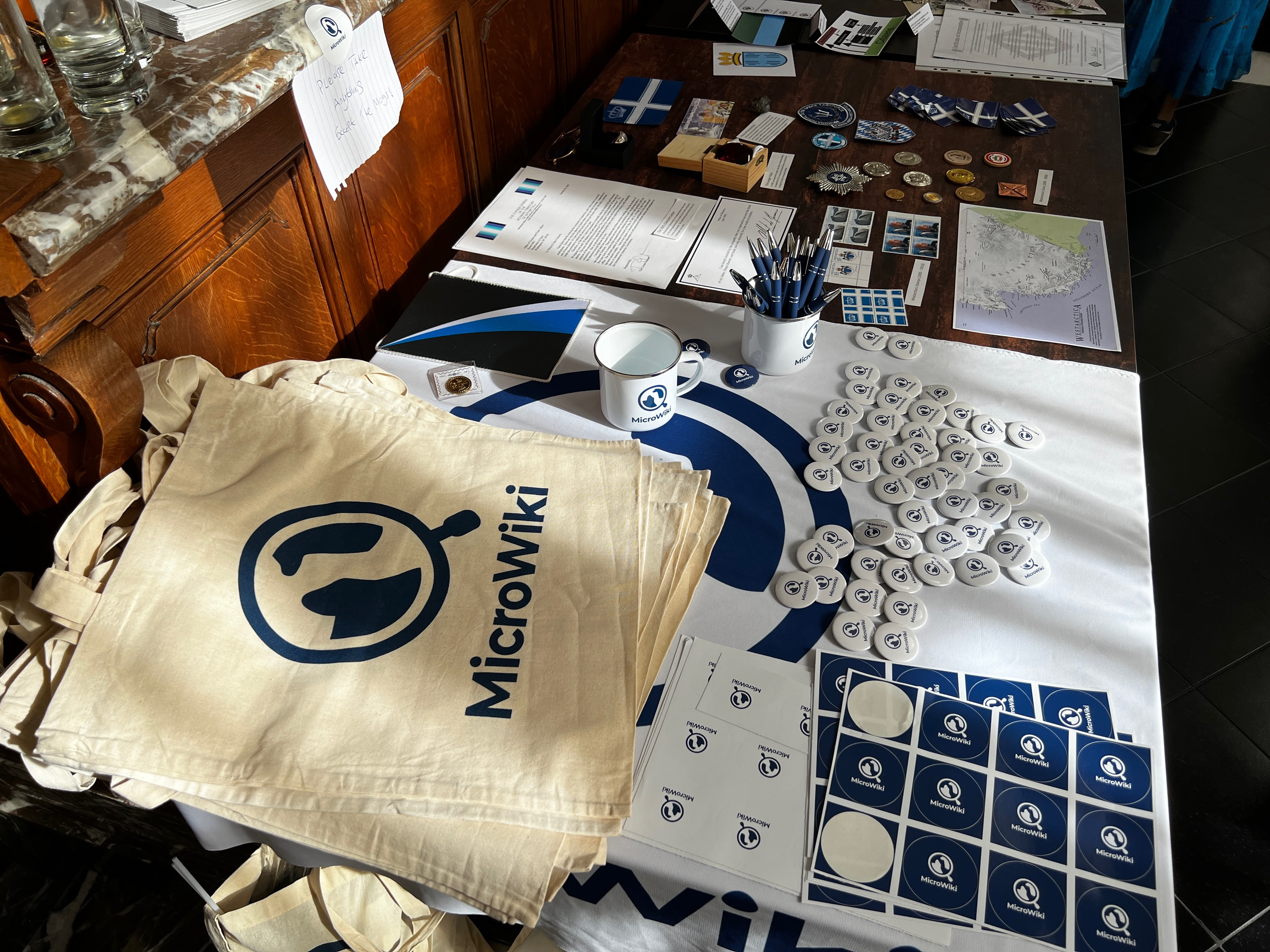
Tables at MicroCon 2023 in Europe displaying merchandise and other items from MicroWiki and Westarctica

MicroCon 2019 commenced between July 19–21 in Hamilton, Canada, and included a gala dinner and laser tag tournament. It was hosted by the United Slabovian Empire. The summit had 113 attendees representing 43 micronations, including two unaffiliated with any micronation. MicroCon 2022, delayed by the COVID-19 pandemic, took place between 4–7 August in Las Vegas, Nevada and saw 100 attendees representing 30 micronations. It was hosted by the Grand Duchy of Westarctica.

MicroCon 2023 consisted of two separate events; the first American summit occurred between June 30–July 2 in Joliet, Illinois, and received 110 delegates from 42 micronations, 132 attendees in total. The second event commenced on August 12 in Ypres, Belgium, and received 68 attendees from 25 micronations. The Royal Republic of Ladonia hosted both summits, the second alongside the Grand Duchy of Flandrensis. The conference in Joliet featured another formal gala, diplomatic reception, a questions and answers session and a micronation show and tell.

MicroCon 2025 occurred between June 27–29 at Ruby Foo's Hotel in Montreal, Canada. Hosted by the Aerican Empire, the event welcomed 47 micronations from countries including Australia, Latvia, and the United Kingdom. In concluding the conference, it was announced that the 2027 iteration would be held in San Diego by Slowjamastan and a European edition in the Principality of Aigues-Mortes in France. The event was covered by micronational researcher, Robert Motum, in Canada's Globe and Mail.

== List ==
Location of North American MicroCon summits
Location of European MicroCon summits

No.	Dates	Location	Host micronation	Attendance	Presenters
1	11 April 2015	(United States) Anaheim, California	Republic of Molossia	36	Adrianne Baugh, Kevin Baugh, Christopher Beyette, George Bragg, Joseph Vladimir Christ, Anastasia von Ephlberg, John Farr, Jacob Felts, Adam Freideck, Travis McHenry, Samantha Miller, Arthur Pagan, Yan Pagh, Henry Roberts, Steven F. Scharff, Carolyn Shelby, McCovey Staples, Vladimir Veselovsky, Carolyn Yagjian
2	23–25 June 2017	(United States) Tucker, Georgia	Kingdom of Ruritania	70+	Michael R. Bannister, Adrianne Baugh, Kevin Baugh, George Bragg, Omar Cisneros, Richard of Edania, Catherine von Ephlberg, Julianna von Ephlberg, Ernest-Emmanuel von Brownburg-Amethonia, John Farr, Eric Lis, Jean-Pierre Pichon, William Soergel, Carolyn Yagjian
3	19–21 July 2019	(Canada) Hamilton, Ontario	United Slabovian Empire	113	Alexis Baugh, Ernest-Emmanuel von Brownburg-Amethonia, Dean Easton, John Farr, Jordan Farmer, Adam Freideck, Eric Lis, Travis McHenry, Kwon Minsung, Jean-Pierre Pichon, Phillip Pillin, Carolyn Shelby, William Soergel, Olivier Touzeau
4	4–7 August 2022	(United States) Las Vegas, Nevada	Westarctica	100	AP, Kevin Baugh, Igor Beloff, Ernest-Emmanuel von Brownburg-Amethonia, Zaq Landsberg, Travis McHenry, John Farr, Jordan Farmer, Bennie Ferguson, Georganna Gore, Robert Motum, Andrew Perdomo, Phillip Pillin, Charles Ross, Carolyn Shelby, Randy Williams
5	30 June–2 July 2023	(United States) Joliet, Illinois	Ladonia	132	George Bragg, Jordan Farmer, John Farr, Eric Lis, Rankin MacGillivray, Katie Bellis Miller, Christina Nowell, Phillip Pillin, Anna Ralls-Ulrich, Matthew Salzer, Carolyn Shelby, Mari Katoka, Randy Williams
5	11–13 August 2023	Ypres, Belgium	Ladonia & Grand Duchy of Flandrensis	68	Adrianne Baugh, Kevin Baugh, Yvan Bertjens, Lloyd Bryant, Dominic Desaintes-Bellamare, Frei von Fräähsen zu Lorenzburg, Ffion McEvoy, Travis McHenry, Vincent Merchadou, Clotilde Milan, Sandra Petermann, Jean-Pierre Pichon, Arthur de Tourneau, Olivier Touzeau, Niels Vermeersch, Randy Williams
6	26–29 June 2025	(Canada) Montreal, Quebec	Aerican Empire, Saint-Castin, & Sancratosia	—	Kevin Baugh, George Bragg, Jordan Farmer, Michael Farr, Eric Lis, Rankin MacGillivray, Christina Nowell Travis McHenry, Jean-Pierre Pichon, Asa Ward, Randy Williams, Matthew Salzer, Anna Ralls-Ulric
7	6-8 August 2027	(United States) San Diego, California	Republic of Slowjamastan		
7	24-26 September 2027	Aigues-Mortes, France	Principality of Aigues-Mortes		

== See also ==
- PoliNation – another recurring micronational summit
