= Micronations: The Lonely Planet Guide to Home-Made Nations =

2006 book about micronations

- Author: John Ryan, George Dunford and Simon Sellars
- Language: English
- Subject: Micronationalism
- Published: September 2006
- Publisher: Lonely Planet
- Publication place: Australia
- Media type: Print
- Pages: 160
- ISBN: 978-1-74104-730-1

Micronations: The Lonely Planet Guide to Home-Made Nations is an Australian gazetteer about micronations, published in September 2006 by Lonely Planet. It was written by John Ryan, George Dunford and Simon Sellars. Self-described as a humorous guidebook and written in a light-hearted tone, the book's profile of micronations offers information on their flags, leaders, currencies, maps and other facts. It was re-subtitled Guide to Self-Proclaimed Nations in later publications.

Ryan first became interested in the concept of micronationalism upon his discovery of the Principality of Hutt River. While pitching the idea to the staff at Lonely Planet, Sellars, who founded his own micronation as a child, overheard Ryan and pestered him for several months after the book's concept had been approved by the publisher until Ryan finally agreed to accept him as a co-writer. Dunford was later also invited by Ryan.

== Background and publication ==
=== Context ===
Micronations are political entities that claim independence and mimic acts of sovereignty as if they were a sovereign state, but lack any legal recognition. They are classified separately from states with limited recognition or quasi-states as they lack the legal basis in international law for their existence. According to Collins English Dictionary, many exist "only on the internet or within the private property of [their] members" and seek to simulate a state rather than to achieve international recognition; their activities are generally non-threatening, often leading sovereign states to not actively contest the territorial claims they put forth. The word micronation has no basis in international law. Lonely Planet is a travel guide publisher based in Australia.

The earliest-published book about micronationalism was How to Start Your Own Country (1979) by libertarian science-fiction author Erwin S. Strauss, in which Strauss documents various approaches to sovereignty and their chances of success. It has since been dubbed the seminal work on the topic. This was followed by two French-language publications—L'Etat c'est moi: histoire des monarchies privées, principautés de fantaisie et autres républiques pirates in 1997 by French writer and historian Bruno Fuligni and Ils ne siègent pas à l'ONU in 2000 by Swiss academic Fabrice O'Driscoll, who also founded the French Institute of Micropatrology.

=== Development and publication ===
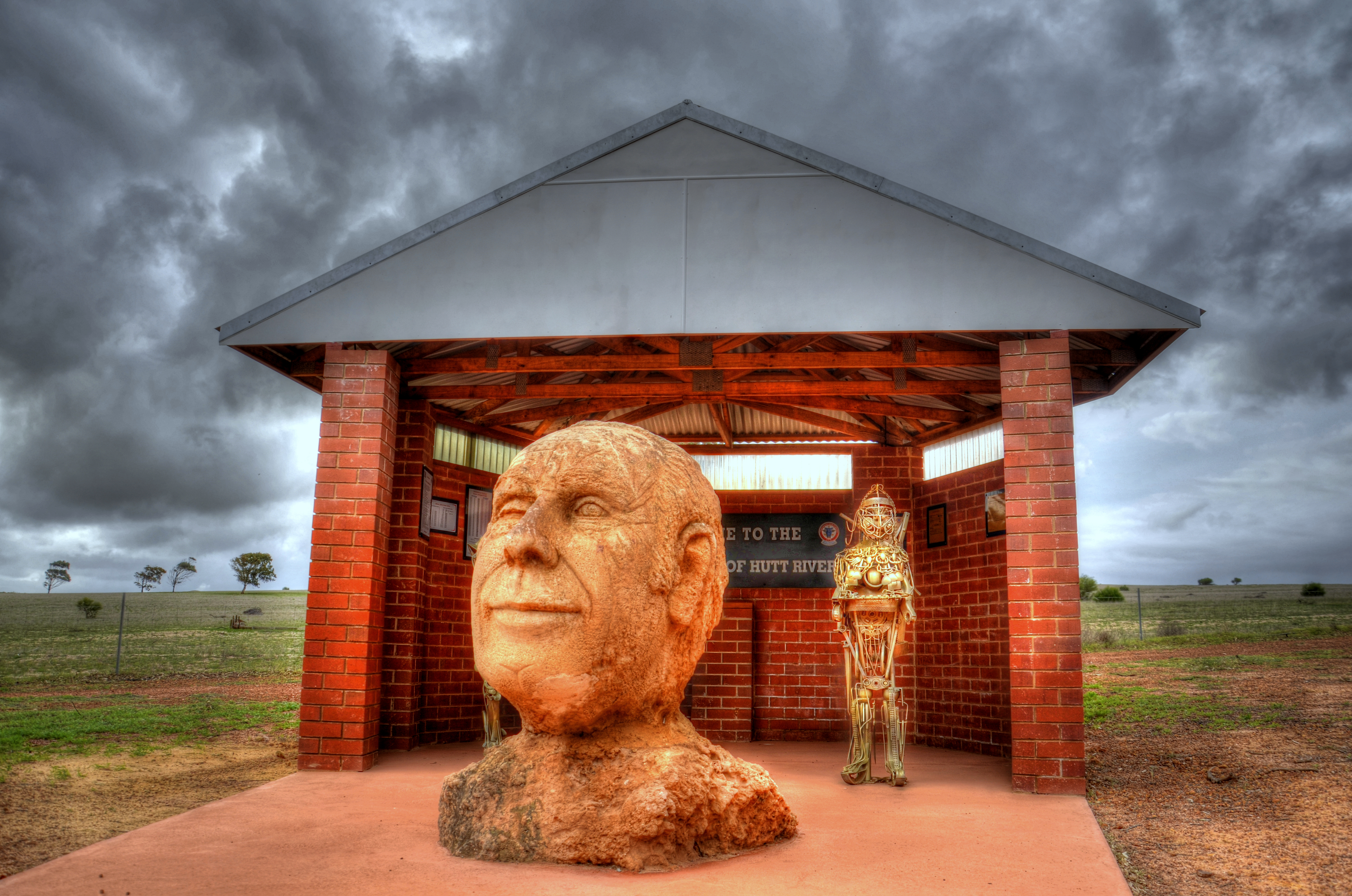
The Principality of Hutt River (bust of Prince Leonard pictured) inspired the creation of Micronations: The Lonely Planet Guide to Home-Made Nations.

Micronations: The Lonely Planet Guide to Home-Made Nations—later re-subtitled Guide to Self-Proclaimed Nations—was published in September 2006 by Lonely Planet as a "fully illustrated, humorous mock-guidebook" to micronations. The book is authored by Australian journalist John Ryan, freelance journalist George Dunford, and writer and blogger Simon Sellars. (Note: Ryan, Dunford & Sellars 2006, pp. 153–54: "The Authors") Ryan, the principal author of the book, became interested in the concept of micronationalism upon his discovery of the Principality of Hutt River located in Australia. After further researching the topic and finding out about the Conch Republic in the United States, Ryan became even more inspired by micronations, saying that as he kept researching "[He] just saw that there were these strange little nations popping up all over the place."

According to Sellars in an interview with BLDGBLOG, he overheard Ryan discussing the idea for a book about micronations with one of the Lonely Planet staff while he was working as an editor for the company. Upon hearing it had been approved, Sellars pestered Ryan for several months until Ryan agreed to accept him as a co-writer. Dunford was later also invited by Ryan. Sellars—who founded his own micronation when he was a kid—became interested in the concept because of his fondness of parallel universes in fiction—"anything that distorts or reflects or comments on the 'real' world – or sets up an alternative world".

== Content ==
Micronations: The Lonely Planet Guide to Home-Made Nations has 160 pages, and includes an introduction and a full index. (Note: Ryan, Dunford & Sellars 2006, "Table of contents") It is fully illustrated. The book's profile of micronations offers information on their flags, leaders, currencies, maps and other facts. Sidebars throughout the book provide overviews of such topics as coinage and stamps, as well as a profile of Emperor Norton. Micronations: The Lonely Planet Guide to Home-Made Nations is split into three parts: "Serious Business", which includes what the authors equate as serious secessionist attempts, "My Backyard, My Nation", (Note: Ryan, Dunford & Sellars 2006, pp. 61–108) which includes local and jocular micronations, and "Grand Dreams", (Note: Ryan, Dunford & Sellars 2006, pp. 109–152) which includes largely imaginative micronations.

Below are the micronations featured in the book, ordered by section:

=== Serious Business ===
- Principality of Sealand, United Kingdom
- Freetown Christiania, Denmark
- Principality of Hutt River, Australia
- Kingdom of Lovely, United Kingdom
- Whangamomona, New Zealand
- Gay and Lesbian Kingdom of the Coral Sea Islands, Australia
- Kingdom of Elleore, Denmark
- Sovereign Military Order of Malta (not a micronation) (Note: Although not seen as a country, the Sovereign Military Order of Malta is not a micronation as it is recognised as a sovereign entity under international law.)
- Akhzivland, Israel
- Northern Forest Archipelago, United States
- Principality of Seborga, Italy
- Freedonia, United States
- Great Republic of Rough and Ready, United States

=== My Backyard, My Nation ===
- Republic of Molossia, United States
- Empire of the United States, United States
- Copeman Empire, United Kingdom
- Empire of Atlantium, Australia
- North Dumpling Island, United States
- Republic of Kugelmugel, Austria
- Grand Duchy of the Lagoan Isles, United Kingdom
- Kingdom of Vikesland, Canada
- Great United Kiseean Kingdom, Finland and Romania
- Kingdom of Romkerhall, Germany
- Ibrosian Protectorate, United Kingdom
- Sovereign Kingdom of Kemetia, United Kingdom
- Kingdom of Talossa, United States
- Aerican Empire, United States
- Republic of Cascadia, United States and Canada
- Principality of Trumania, United States
- Kingdom of Redonda, Antigua and Barbuda

=== Grand Dreams ===
- Grand Duchy of Westarctica, Antarctica
- Borovnia, fictional
- Maritime Republic of Eastport, United States
- Republic of Rathnelly, Canada
- Republic of Saugeais, France
- Barony of Caux, France
- Nutopia, non-territorial
- Conch Republic, United States
- Le Royaume de L'Anse-Saint-Jean, Canada
- Royal Republic of Ladonia, Sweden
- Dominion of British West Florida, United States
- Grand Duchy of Elsanor, United States
- Principality of Snake Hill, Australia
- SoS (State of Sabotage), Finland

== Critical reception ==
Peter Needham, writing for The Australian, and Jesse Walker, in The American Conservative, both appreciated the book's light-hearted approach to micronations. Needham, extending his appreciation to the work's approach to politics, called the book "amusing" while Walker compared it to Strauss' How to Start Your Own Country and reflected that Micronations had a greater focus on whimsical "tongue-in-cheek projects", citing Molossia as an example. Jo Sargent, writing in The Geographical Magazine, was more critical, saying that while he thinks Lonely Planet produces excellent guidebooks, Micronations was more limited to eccentric micronational leaders rather than their micronations.

Needham also appreciated the work's scope, quipping that "the prospect of a listing in future editions" would be an added incentive to those wanting to found their own micronations. Conversely, Sargent thought that, although the book was amusing at first and has some interesting entries, the large number of micronations eventually becomes uninteresting. He stated that there is only "so many 'wacky' young men deciding that life is unfair and setting up a nation in their bedroom" that one can read about before getting bored. Walker concluded their review by saying that the book makes for "entertaining reading," and wrote that it might be useful as an actual guide to the profiled micronations if one wished to visit them.

== See also ==
- Micronations and the Search for Sovereignty (2021)
- How to Rule Your Own Country: The Weird and Wonderful World of Micronations (2022)
- List of micronations
