= How to Start Your Own Country (disambiguation) =

How to Start Your Own Country is a British six-part documentary comedy series.

How to Start Your Own Country may also refer to:

- How to Start Your Own Country (book), a 1979 non-fiction book
- How to Start Your Own Country (film), a 2010 documentary film
