= PoliNation =

Conference of micronationalists

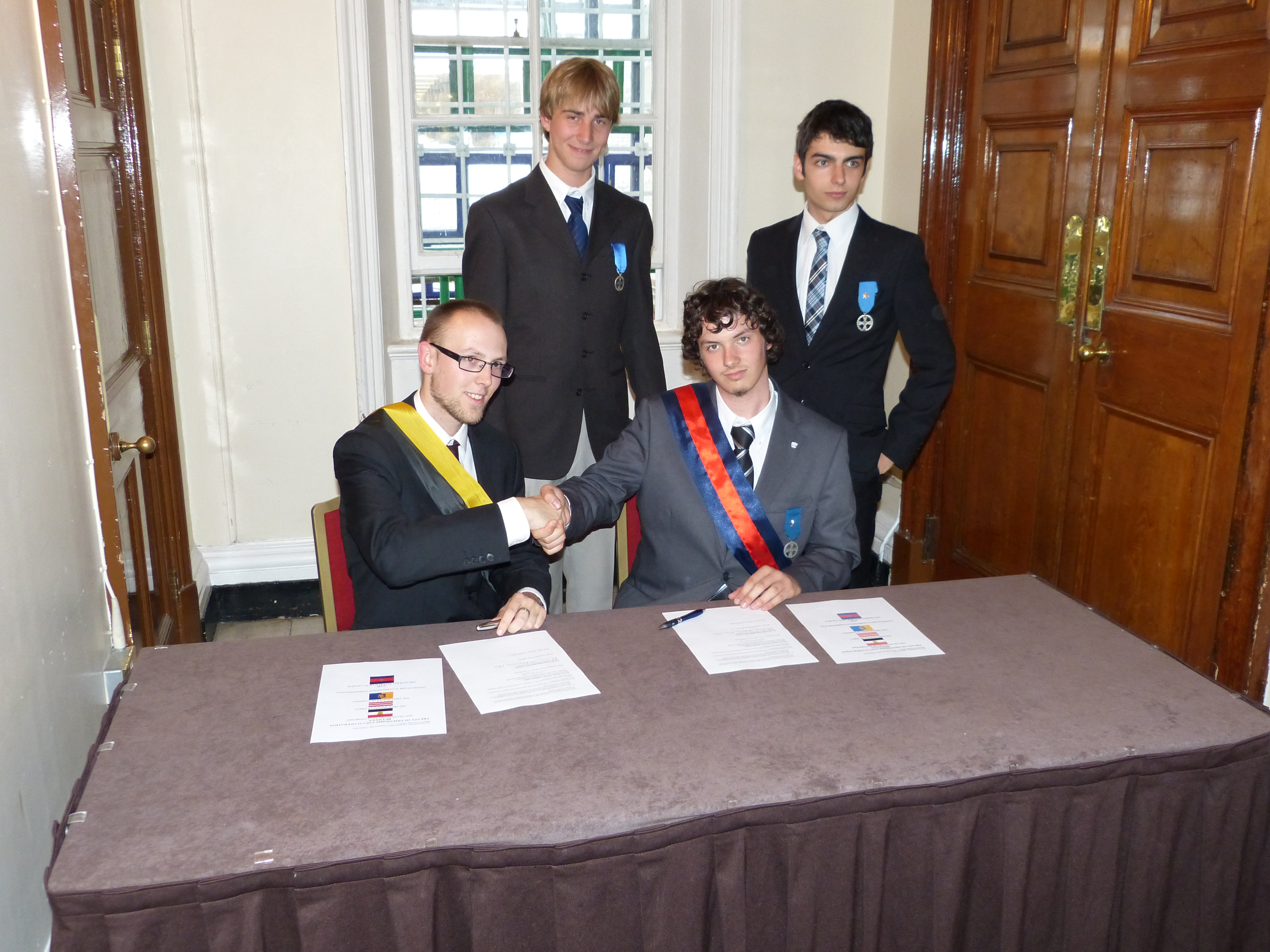
- Two attendees of PoliNation 2012 after signing a treaty
- Genre: Micronational
- Frequency: Sporadic
- Inaugurated: 17 April 2010
- Organizer: Micronational governments

PoliNation is a recurring summit or conference of micronationalists held sporadically since 17 April 2010. Each summit usually has academics, authors and journalists present.

== Summits ==
The first summit, described as a conference, occurred at Dangar Island in Sydney on 17 April 2010. It was organised by Judy Lattas of the Department of Sociology at Macquarie University, George Cruickshank—self-stylised George II—of the Empire of Atlantium and Princess Paula of the Principality of Snake Hill. Numerous micronations were in attendance, and the conference included a keynote session for speakers. PoliNation 2012, held on 14 July at Chelsea Old Town Hall in Chelsea, London, was organised by Lattas and Cruickshank with assistance from Jacopo Castelletti of the Federal Republic of Saint Charlie. Several academics, authors and journalists were in attendance alongside micronationalists. The conference also included a half-hour lunch break.

PoliNation 2015 commenced for two days, between 4–5 July in the Free Republic of Alcatraz, a micronation near Perugia in Umbria, Italy. 14 micronations registered to attend. As with previous editions, scholars and journalists were also in attendance at the conference. Topics of discussion included an intermicronational organisation similar to the United Nations, ways of conducting trade between micronations, micronational economics and the Alcatraz Environmental Treaty of 2015 regarding climate change was unveiled at the conference.

George Cruickshank had planned another PoliNation in Australia for 2024, but this was cancelled due to a lack of interest.

== List ==
Location of Australian PoliNation summits
Location of European PoliNation summits

No.	Dates	Location	Attendance	Presenters
1	17 April 2010	(Australia) Dangar Island, New South Wales	40	Arthur Cristian, Darryl Keam, Faye Combe, George Cruickshank, Jason Mckerra, Judy Lattas, Paula Jensen, Paul Delprat, Peter Gillies, Phillip Fish, Stephen Szabo, William Pitt
2	14 July 2012	London, United Kingdom	32	Alexei Monroe, Eric Lis, George Cruickshank, Jacopo Castelletti, Jorge Fernández Vidal, Judy Lattas, Petr Dvorak, Stéphane Monnerville, Stéphane-Bertin Hoffman
3	4–5 July 2015	Gubbio, Italy	18	Carolyn Shelby, Christopher Roth, Elena Zanforlin, Irina Ulrike Andel, Jean-Pierre Pichon, Judy Lattas, Julien Oeuillet, Lachlan McKinnon, Mirko Sennewald, Niels Vermeersch, Olivier Touzeau, Santo Carbone, Stéphane Monnerville
	3–4 October 2024	(Australia) Katoomba, New South Wales	N/A	Cancelled

== See also ==
- MicroCon – a biennial micronational convention
