= Micronations (film) =

2026 documentary film

- Directed by: Joe Kowalski
- Written by: Joe Kowalski; Tom Zavertnik
- Produced by: Geoff Yaw; Adam J. Wilde; Ryan J. Kelly; Joe Kowalski; Tom Zavertnik
- Cinematography: Andrew Jurcak
- Edited by: Joe Kowalski; Tom Zavertnik
- Music by: Oliver Buckland
- Release date: 2026
- Running time: 97 minutes
- Language: English

Micronations is a 2026 documentary film about micronations directed by Joe Kowalski and written and edited by Kowalski and Tom Zavertnik. The film has received positive reviews.

== Production ==
Production lasted for five years. Kowalski, an independent filmmaker from Oberlin, Ohio, discovered the concept of a micronation in 2021 after reading about it on Wikipedia and became intrigued by the subject. Filming commenced in 2022 with a crew that consisted of around eight people. The production team "took on debt to keep shooting" and, during flights to Europe, put all of their filming equipment into the overhead bins to avoid paying check-in fees.

Substance, an initiative of Cleveland–based TRG Multimedia, bought the rights to the film, which Kowalski says enabled him to complete Micronations as he envisioned it. The music was composed by Oliver Buckland. Post-production was completed "weeks before Tribeca announced its selections." The film explores concepts such as nationalism, institutional collapse, identity, isolation, and community.

== Release ==
The film had its world premiere at the Tribeca Festival in June 2026 and has since had screenings featuring micronationalist guests at the Cleveland Institute of Art, the Oak Cliff Film Festival, the Buffalo International Film Festival and the University of Toronto, among others.

== Reception ==
The film has received positive reviews. Peter Gray, writing for The AU Review, gave the film four out of five stars, calling it charming and whimsical whilst simultaneously giving "a thoughtful examination of why people create [micronations]", further saying that Kowalski approaches the subjects of his documentary with an earnest "curiosity that proves infectious". Tina Kakadelis of Beyond the Cinerama Dome echoed these points, dubbing the film a "clever bait and switch" for initially introducing the viewer to hobbyist and whimsical micronations before going on to document micronational entities that experiment with the concept of sovereignty as a means of protest." Douglas Davidson of Elements of Madness concluded that "it disarms the audience so thoroughly that one finds themselves gob smacked by the poignancy."

== See also ==
- Empire Me: New Worlds Are Happening!—a 2011 German-language documentary film about micronations
- How to Start Your Own Country (film)—a 2010 Canadian documentary film about micronations
