= Empire Me: New Worlds Are Happening! =

2012 German-language documentary film

- Directed by: Paul Poet
- Written by: Paul Poet
- Produced by: Johannes Rosenberger
- Edited by: Karina Ressler
- Music by: Alexander Hacke
- Production company: Navigator Film
- Distributed by: Elmo Movieworld Filmverleih
- Release dates: March 2011 (Diagonale); 19 January 2012
- Running time: 100 minutes
- Countries: Germany; Australia; Austria; Denmark; Italy; Slovenia; United Kingdom
- Language: German

Empire Me: New Worlds Are Happening! (German: Empire Me - Der Staat bin ich!, lit. 'Empire Me - I Am the State!') is a 2011 German-language documentary film about micronations written and directed by the Austrian Paul Poet and produced by Johannes Rosenberger.

== Premise ==
Stylised like a road movie, Empire Me: New Worlds Are Happening! concerns writer and director Paul Poet as he visits six aspirant political entities—three micronations, the Principality of Sealand in the United Kingdom, Principality of Hutt River in Australia and Freetown Christiania in Denmark, the ecovillages of the Federation of Damanhur in Italy and ZEGG in Germany, and the Swimming Cities of Serenissima, three hand-crafted sea vessels in the Adriatic Sea in Slovenia.

== Production ==
Empire Me was produced by Navigator Film in co-production with Minotaurus Film and Gebrueder Beetz Filmproduktion. Prior to the film's release, Paul Poet had been travelling to such political communities for eight years. Filming for the work commenced between March 2009 and April 2010, and post-production concluded in March 2011. Empire Me was edited by Karina Ressler and produced by Johannes Rosenberger; Andrea Minauf was the production manager, and the soundtrack was composed by Alexander Hacke. The film received funding from the Österreichisches Filminstitut, Cinestyria Film Commission and Fonds, Film Fund Luxembourg and Medienboard Berlin-Brandenburg.

== Release and reception ==
Empire Me: New Worlds Are Happening! was released in Austrian cinemas on 19 January 2012. It opened with $5,084 for a total box office gross of $6,018 from 3,099 admissions. The film was disturbed in Austria by Elmo Movieworld Filmverleih.

=== Critical reception ===
Michael Meyns of Berliner Morgenpost gave the film three out of five stars. He found the ideas of the micronational entities interesting, but disliked that Poet occasionally "[lost] himself in the picturesque" by focusing on the unconventional nature of the groups rather than their original political motivations.

== See also ==
- How to Start Your Own Country (film), 2010 Canadian documentary film about micronations
