= MIT Science Fiction Society =

Student organization of MIT

Coordinates: 42°21′33″N 71°5′40″W

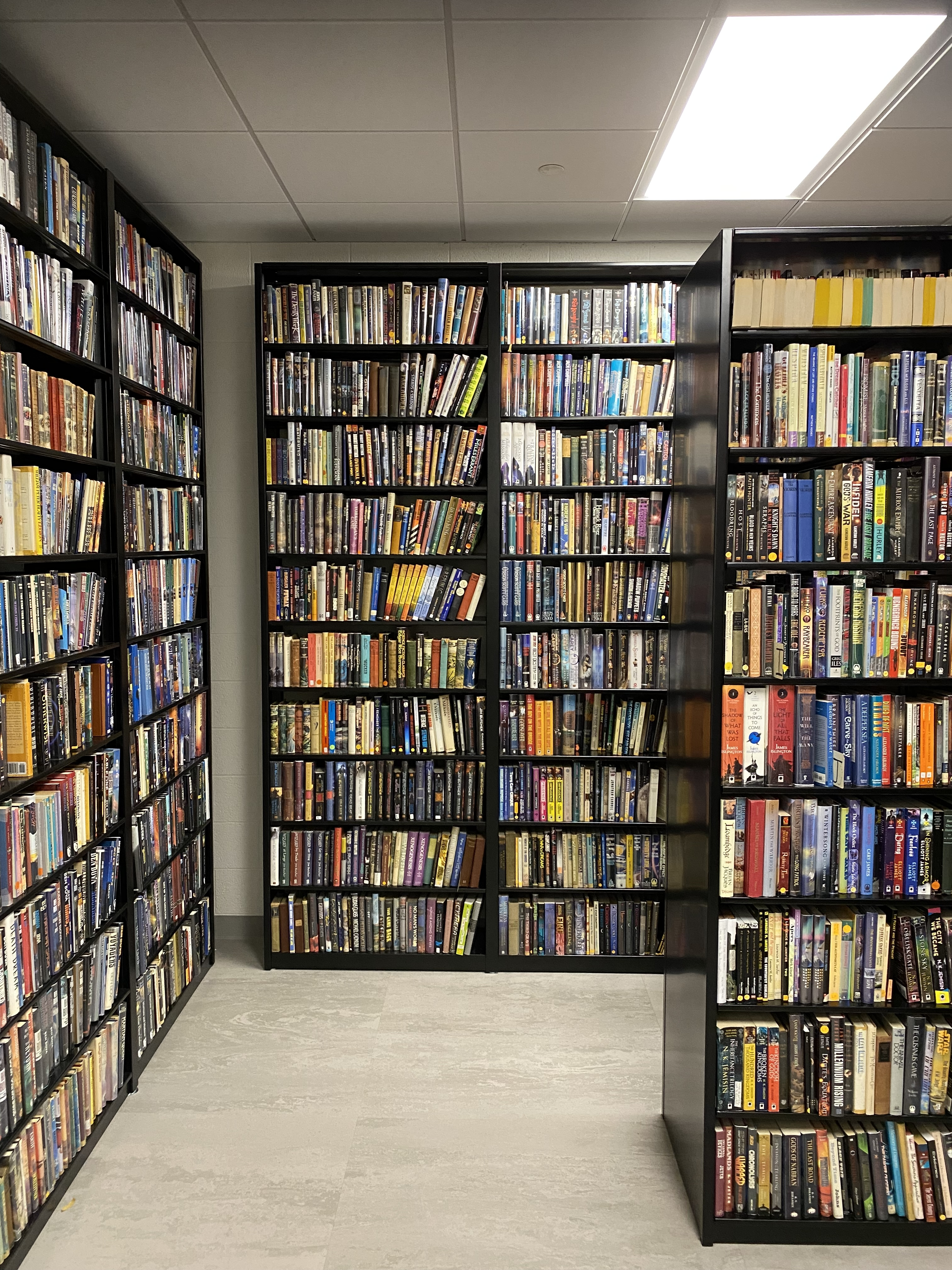
The back room of the library, where the hardcovers live

The MIT Science Fiction Society (or MITSFS) of the Massachusetts Institute of Technology is a student organization which maintains and administers a large publicly accessible library of science fiction, fantasy, and science fantasy books and magazines.

== History ==
In 1950, the club was instrumental in microfilming Astounding Science Fiction, leading to it becoming a recognized student organization in 1951. In 1961, Anthony R. Lewis became Librarian, and the library growth began in earnest. With the Stratton Student Center opening in 1965, the Society moved out of the old Walker Memorial building to the new building. At about the same time, Erwin Strauss compiled a science fiction index for periodicals from 1951 to 1955, called The MIT Science Fiction Society's Index to the S-F Magazines 1951 - 1965. MIT rules barred the Society from publishing the book because student organizations were prohibited from commercial activity, so Strauss published it himself under the same title.

In 1965, MITSFS joined with the UMass SFS and others, including Hal Clement, in forming the "Boston Science Fiction Society", holding the first Boskone convention. In 1967, NESFA arose from the ashes of that group, and brought the WorldCon to Boston in 1971. In the mid-1970s, the MIT Libraries started partially funding acquisition of newly published books.

In 1972, the widow of respected Golden Age editor John W. Campbell donated her husband's personal set of Astounding Science Fiction. Campbell had almost finished an MIT physics degree, but transferred to Duke University to avoid a German language requirement, and then pursued a lifetime career in writing and editing science fiction.

== Society ==
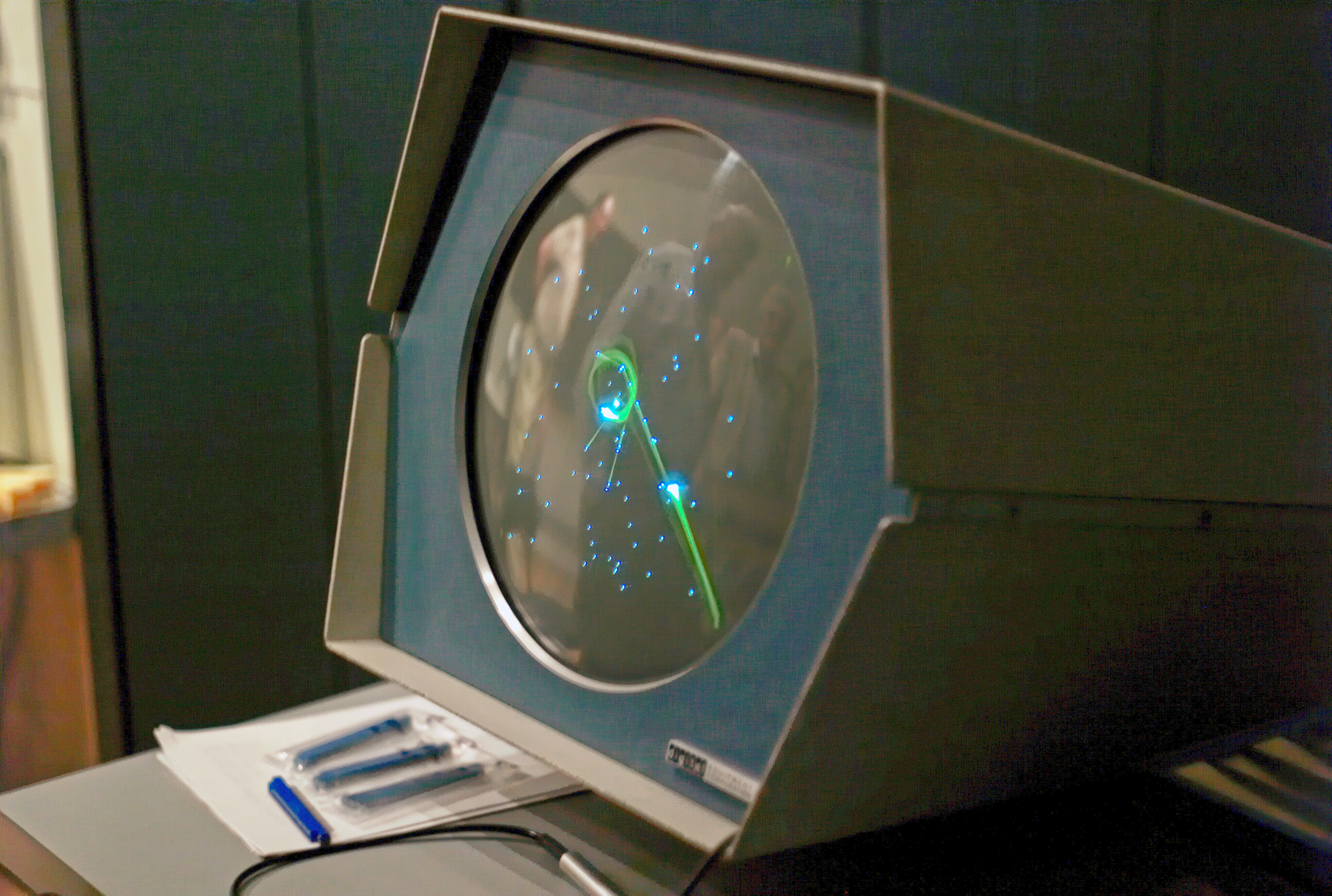
Spacewar! video game written at MIT in 1962, on an early PDP-1 minicomputer

Guest speakers at meetings of the Society have included Hugo Gernsback (whose 1963 address to the Society has been published as "Prophets of Doom"), Frederik Pohl, John W. Campbell, Isaac Asimov, Hal Clement, and Larry Niven, and more recently John Scalzi and Charles Stross. The Society was instrumental in the first Boskone science fiction convention, in NESFA founding, and in the Noreascon in 1971, among others.

Some past members include Durk Pearson, Rick Norwood, Al Kuhfeld, Bill Sarill, Whit Diffie, Geoffrey A. Landis, Erwin Strauss, and Guy Consolmagno. The Society has been mentioned in Laurence M. Janifer's The Counterfeit Heinlein: A Gerald Knave Science Fiction Adventure.

The Society is informal in its operations, but has developed an elaborate pseudo-hierarchy with officer titles such as "Skinner", "Lord High Embezzler", and "Onseck". However, actual theft and vandalism are regarded as serious crimes, and strict security rules have developed to protect the collection, such as requiring that all backpacks, permanent markers, and pens be left at the library entrance.

A MITSFS seal has been developed, which is a further modification of the modernized version of the MIT Official Seal. The figure on the left wears something resembling a space helmet on his head, and the figure on the right brandishes what looks like a ray gun. The latter figure may also have three legs.

MITSFS cites finding adequate physical space for its large and growing library collection as its most pressing challenge. More than 52,000 books and 14,000 magazines are stored in under 1,700 square feet (160 m^{2}).

== Library ==
The over 60,000 volumes constitute the "world's largest open-shelf collection of science fiction"; although the Eaton collection of the University of California, Riverside is larger, that collection is not open shelf. According to MITSFS, the library once included "over 90% of all science fiction ever published in English", although with the increase of self-publishing in the 2000s, this is likely no longer true. The library is freely available for browsing by the public, as well as for borrowing by members. Membership is open to anyone who pays the modest dues and agrees to abide by the rules.

The library is financially supported by membership dues, and by MIT's Association of Student Activities funding board. The catalog of the library may be searched online through the PinkDex. Some of the library's contents include full runs of Astounding Science Fiction and other science fiction magazines, and full or nearly full runs of many fantasy magazines; these are catalogued in the MagDex. It also has sections devoted to foreign and multimedia works.

The collection is physically located on the 4th floor of MIT's Julius Adams Stratton Student Center at 84 Massachusetts Avenue, Cambridge, Massachusetts. In 2017, the library was usually open 7 days a week, though Monday hours were curtailed or occasionally dropped, and summer hours were reduced. In 2020 through 2022, COVID-19 pandemic restrictions on public access to campus caused major cutbacks of hours and the more limited calendar continues post-pandemic. The opening hours can be found on the organization's website.

In February 2023, a burst pipe in the Student Center caused flooding in the Library (dubbed the “Aquapocalypse” in MITSFS terms), causing the contents of the library to be packed up and sent for professional freeze-drying preservation and storage while the building was repaired and renovated (in particular, for the abatement of damaged asbestos tiles). Although the flood did not cause substantial damage to the primary collection, it did impact donations; the ones being processed were damaged by water, and the shutdown left the library unable to process donations while closed. The building was emptied and renovations began in the summer of 2023. Books and magazines were returned from storage in March 2024, new shelving was installed, and the library officially reopened on April 4, 2025, though still at reduced hours due to a limited number of available volunteers to keep it open.
