= Maritime Republic of Eastport =

Seaside neighborhood community and tongue-in-cheek micronation in Annapolis, Maryland

Coordinates: 38°58′13″N 76°28′53″W

- Micronation (unrecognized entity)
- Coat of Arms
- Area claimed: Eastport: a neighborhood of Annapolis, Maryland, US
- Dates claimed: 25 January 1998–present

The Maritime Republic of Eastport (MRE), commonly known as simply Eastport, is a seaside neighborhood community and tongue-in-cheek micronation located in Annapolis, Maryland in the US. The neighborhood was first settled in 1655, and became known as Eastport in 1888, before being annexed to Annapolis in 1951. In 1998, Eastport residents declared independence as a mock secession in response to the Maryland State Highway Administration's temporary shutdown of the drawbridge connecting Eastport to the rest of Annapolis. The micronation hosts numerous fundraisers, including an annual tug of war, 0.05 km (55 yd) run across the aforementioned bridge and annual "Burning of the Socks". The micronation is popular among tourists.

== History ==
The neighborhood was first settled in 1655 and annexed to Annapolis in 1951.

The idea for the Maritime Republic of Eastport was conceived by a group of local residents in a pub. The micronation was declared on 25 January 1998 as a mock secession in response to the Maryland State Highway Administration's temporary shutdown of the drawbridge connecting Eastport to Annapolis. According its website; "The prime mission was to find a creative way to promote and encourage the patronage of Eastport businesses that were destined to be hurt by the Maryland State Highway Administration's shutting down for repair of the drawbridge connecting mainland Annapolis with the Eastport peninsula." The microstate's motto is "We like it this way".

Fort Meade soldiers participate in Annapolis/Eastport tug-of-war in 2012

By 2000, the existence of the micronation became widely-known by the other residents of Eastport, which was met with favourable approval from them. Though its independence is not recognised by any world government, Annapolis is aware of the jocular claim, and Eastport and Annapolis participate against each other in an annual tug of war.

The MRE features an annual bridge run between Annapolis and Eastport. Runners take part in a .05k bridge run across the Spa Creek Bridge. The tradition comes from the closure of the bridge in 1998, sparking the secession.

The micronation was featured in Lonely Planet's Micronations: The Lonely Planet Guide to Home-Made Nations, published in 2006.

== Notable residents ==
- Terence Smith (journalist)
