= Garfield Kennedy =

Garfield Kennedy is a documentary and fiction film-maker and producer based in Somerset, England. He was elected as a Liberal Democrat District Councillor for the Shepton West Ward of Mendip District Council in a by-election in July 2010.

Kennedy attended Coleraine Academical Institution and studied Architecture at the University of Edinburgh where he edited The Student newspaper and founded the long-running Festival Times newspaper with (now broadcaster) Sheena McDonald. Festival Times was the first publication to give dedicated and extensive coverage of the Edinburgh Festival (Fringe, International Festival and Film Festival). He then joined Granada Television in Manchester in 1975 and later formed his own independent production company.

== Filmography ==
Kennedy's films include a series of documentaries on Sir Richard Branson and adventurer Per Lindstrand's successful flights across the Atlantic in 1987, then Pacific in 1990, and their series of attempts to fly non-stop around the world in a Rozière balloon in the late 1990s. He shot the film of the world's first circumnavigation of the world by balloon when Swiss psychiatrist, Bertrand Piccard, and English balloon pilot, Brian Jones, flew their Breitling Orbiter 3 Rozière balloon over the Mauritanian coast completing the flight in 19 days, 21 hours, and 55 minutes. This series of films won the Grand Prix at the Jules Verne Adventure Film Festival in Paris and the Audience Award at the same Festival.

He produced and directed the Emmy Award-winning 9/11 documentary for the BBC and PBS WGBH Boston, Why the Towers Fell and has completed a series of fiction shorts including the BAFTA Nominated Bye-Child (written and directed by Bernard MacLaverty. MacLaverty won the Best New Director at the BAFTA Scotland Awards for the film.

In addition, Kennedy produced The Fall of Shug McCracken which won the Best Comedy Award at the Santa Monica Film Festival and documentary, "The Grandparents" directed by Romanian-born Ioana Joca, which was nominated for Best New Work and for the Best New Director Awards by BAFTA Scotland.

In 2005 Kennedy executive produced the BBC factual entertainment series How to Start Your Own Country where writer/comedian, Danny Wallace formed his own micronation and named it "Lovely". The series and its associated website and interactive TV shows won two national BAFTA Awards in 2006.

In 2006–2007, Kennedy series produced Young Peoples Programmes for Raidió Teilifís Éireann in Dublin, then produced and directed a film on the murder of British student, Meredith Kercher, in Perugia Italy in November 2007.

== Liberal Democrat Councillor ==
Kennedy now lives in Somerset where he was elected as a Liberal Democrat District Councillor in July 2010 for the Shepton West Ward of Mendip District Council.. The vacancy arose due to the non-attendance of a Conservative Party councillor, who was removed from office. Kennedy's election removed the Conservatives majority on Mendip Council.
