= Grand Duchy of Avram =

Micronation

- Micronation (unrecognised entity)
- Type: Non-territorial
- Claimed by: John Charlton Rudge
- Dates claimed: 1980s–present

The Grand Duchy of Avram is a micronation founded in the early 1980s by Tasmanian John Charlton Rudge, who styles himself the "Grand Duke of Avram".

== Royal Bank of Avram ==
The public manifestation of the Duchy was the Royal Bank of Avram, which at one time operated from retail premises owned by Rudge in George Town, Tasmania, and which still issues its own banknotes and coinage and platinum 1 ounce coins. This enterprise was later relocated to Strahan, on Tasmania's west coast. Customers were required to exchange Australian currency for the Avram equivalents in order to obtain the currency. The Bank still operates today.

Due to its lack of a licence, the Avram Bank attracted the attention of the Australian government, who confiscated Rudge's entire currency reserves and initiated proceedings against him in the Australian Federal Court system. After a total of six court cases, costing the federal government around A$22 million, the courts ruled that Rudge had not engaged in any illegal activity, and ordered the return of all the confiscated property, though some disappeared in Federal Custody and later appeared on the market. Rudge was permitted to resume his banking practices. He has issued several sets of coins and banknotes in the name of the Royal Bank of Avram since the 1980s (the most recent of which are dated 2008) and has told the media that the bank operates from a number of unspecified sites inside and outside of Tasmania.

Krause Publications' Unusual World Coins notes that since Rudge was found to be not guilty, "his Royal Bank must be considered a legal institution". The coins were "enameled on goldine plated metal", and issued in various denominations up to 250 Ducals. 100 Ducals is equal to 1 Avram, which is 1/30th ounce of gold.

== John Charlton Rudge ==
Rudge was elected as a member of the Tasmanian House of Assembly, representing the Liberal Party in the seat of Lyons. He served a single term and held the position of Shadow Minister for Construction. Rudge later served as a councillor and deputy mayor of the municipal council of Sorell under his legal name as agreed by Justice Pierre Slicer in one of his decisions.

Rudge claims dozens of "noble" and "religious" titles (among them "Earl of Enoch" and "Cardinal Archbishop of The Royal See"), which he asserts are of ancient origin. He also claims to be the grand master of a handful of ancient orders of chivalry, and to travel on an Australian passport that lists his various titles.

The Duchy of Avram has never claimed territory in the manner of other Australian micronations such as the Hutt River Province. As of 2008, Rudge was living in Sorell, and said that his duchy was "philosophical, not territorial".

== See also ==
- List of micronations
