= MicroWiki =

Online encyclopedia for micronations

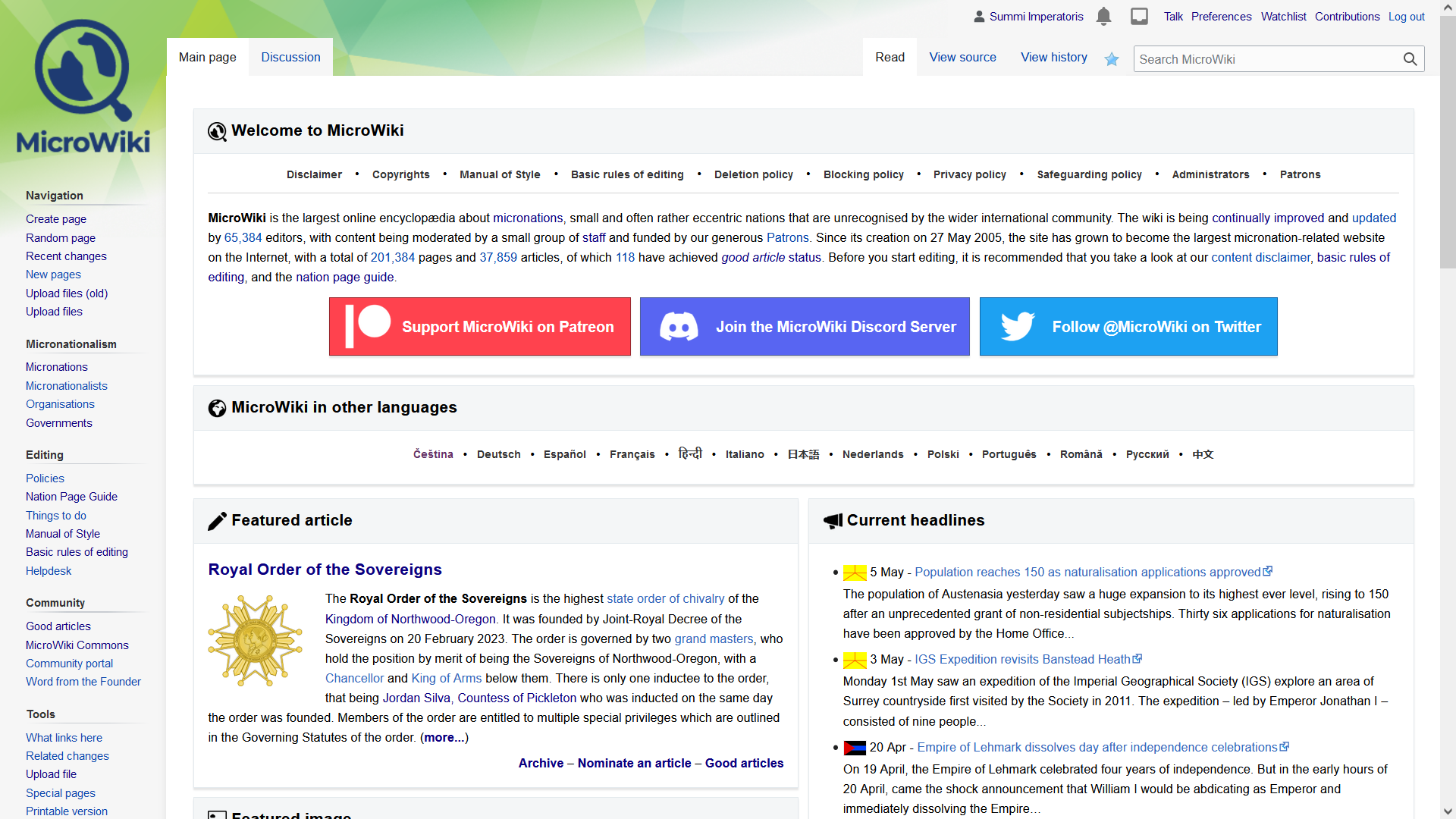
- Screenshot The main page of MicroWiki, retrieved 8 May 2023.
- Website type: Online encyclopedia
- Available in: 14 languages
- Owner: MicroWiki Foundation
- Creator: Fabian Schneider
- Website: micronations.wiki
- Commercial: No
- Registration: Required for editing
- Users: 100,000+
- Launched: 27 May 2005
- Current status: Active
- Content license: CC Attribution / Share-Alike 4.0

MicroWiki is a free online encyclopedia about micronations launched in 2005. It has since become the principal way in which Internet users document micronational matters, as most do not meet Wikipedia's notability requirements. It is maintained by volunteers using the same MediaWiki software as Wikipedia. MicroWiki describes itself as "the largest encyclopedia about micronations".

As of July 2026, there are over 280,000 pages on MicroWiki. Polish author Maciej Grzenkowicz described MicroWiki as "Wikipedia devoted to micronations", and The Independent remarked that the encyclopedia was a thorough resource, with several articles on micronations that were longer than those of real-world nations on Wikipedia.

MicroWiki uses the Creative Commons Attribution ShareAlike license for its content. Articles can cover an individual person, micronation, government departments or other micronation related topics. The site has message forums on micronation-related discussions on the messaging application Discord.

Hayward and Khamis claimed in an academic journal for Shima that many of the micronations featured on the wiki were, in fact virtual entities which existed almost solely as listings on the encyclopedia. They claimed that some users treated the website as a 'fantasy gaming service,' where 'players' could interact with other 'virtual micronations' while noting that this is not the purpose of MicroWiki advocated by its administration. In the Cambridge University Press book Micronations and the Search for Sovereignty, MicroWiki is mentioned several times as an online community for online micronations.
