= Løvejagten =

1907 Danish silent film

- Photo Still from the 1907 Film
- Directed by: Viggo Larsen
- Written by: Arnold Richard Nielsen
- Produced by: Ole Olsen
- Starring: Viggo Larsen; Knud Lumbye
- Cinematography: Axel Graatkjaer
- Distributed by: Nordisk Film
- Release date: 1907
- Running time: 10 minutes
- Country: Denmark
- Languages: Silent Film; Danish intertitles

Løvejagten (Danish for "the lion hunt", English title: The Lion Hunt) is a controversial 1907 silent film by Danish producer Ole Olsen and director Viggo Larsen. The short ten-minute movie caused an enormous public protest in Denmark because it depicted the actual shooting of two captive lions.

== Synopsis ==
Løvejagten (1907)

Two big game hunters are on safari in the jungle with their African guide. They observe zebras, ostrich and a hippopotamus, and catch a small monkey for a pet. During the night they are awakened by a lion which kills a small goat and then the hunters' horse. The hunters shoot the lion as it stands by the water on a beach. They discover another lion and shoot it also. The lions are gutted and skinned. The happy hunters sit and smoke cigarettes afterward.

== Production and controversy ==
The ten-minute "jungle" movie (215 meters of 35mm film) was actually filmed on location in Denmark. Scenes of the hunters in the forest were shot in Jægersborg Dyrehave park near Copenhagen. The animals were filmed at the Copenhagen Zoo with the camera aimed downward to avoid any view of the enclosures. The controversial shooting of two lions took place on the small island of Elleore in the Roskilde fjord.

In the summer of 1907, Ole Olsen decorated Elleore with palm fronds and artificial plants to simulate a tropical savanna. He then bought two elderly lions from the Hagenbeck Zoo in Hamburg, Germany for the large sum of 5000 deutschmarks. When the Danish Society for the Prevention of Cruelty to Animals learned about Olsen's plan to shoot the lions for his movie, they protested to the Danish Minister of Justice Peter Adler Alberti. Alberti banned the filming. Two days later, however, Olsen defiantly shot the scenes as planned, then smuggled the film to Sweden. Olsen's cinematographer, Axel Graatkjær, was arrested and spent a day in jail. At a court hearing, Alberti banned the movie in Denmark and revoked Olsen's license for his Biograf Theater.

== Aftermath ==
In 1907, Olsen premiered The Lion Hunt in Sweden. Because of the publicity from the protests, Løvejagten was a huge success abroad. The following year, after the charges of animal cruelty were dropped and the Danish ban was rescinded, the film had its homeland premiere on November 11, 1908. Nordisk Film Kompagni eventually sold 259 prints of Løvejagten, which earned the company an enormous profit. It ushered in the "golden age" of Danish cinema when Nordisk Film became the most productive film company in Europe. A sequel to the film, Bear Hunting in Russia, was shot in 1909 and was also a profitable movie, eventually selling 118 prints.

== Cast and crew ==
Viggo Larsen directed the filming as well as acted as one of the hunters. Knud Lumbye portrayed the second hunter and William Thomsen played the African guide. Axel Graatkjær, who later became a favorite cinematographer of August Blom and Urban Gad, shot the film, credited under his actual name of A. Sørensen.
