= League of Secessionist States =

Organisation for micronations

- Logo since 2009
- Type: Intermicronational organisation
- Membership: 40 member states (2011)

Establishment
  - Founded: 26 November 1980; 45 years ago
  - Reestablished: April 1996; 30 years ago
- Website theloss.org

The League of Secessionist States (LoSS; LOSS) is a dormant, Internet-based intermicronational organisation that exists "to promote intermicronational communication and partnership, and serves to act as a supramicronational, impartial Body where such a need for one may exist." Initially established on 26 November 1980 by Robert B. Madison, self-proclaimed king of the Kingdom of Talossa, it was reestablished in April 1996 during a "micronational boom" on the Internet. It was the principal intermicronational organisation on the Internet between 1997 and at least 2000.

== History ==
The League of Secessionist States (LoSS) was founded on 26 November 1980 by Robert B. Madison, self-proclaimed king of the Kingdom of Talossa, during his childhood. It was originally an alliance between three micronations in opposition towards a fourth. After 1983, the LoSS became inactive. In April 1996, during a "micronational boom" on the Internet, Madison reestablished the LoSS and accepted four member states. With all activity based online, the league was one of several intermicronational organisations founded during this boom. Its website states that its goal is "to promote intermicronational communication and partnership, and serves to act as a supramicronational, impartial Body where such a need for one may exist." Between 1997 and at least 2000, it was the most prominent intermicronational organisation on the Internet. In January 2005, the league had over 30 member states, and was described in an issue of Information Today as "sort of a United Nations for imaginary countries." On 25 August 2007, another intermicronational organisation, the League of Micronations, merged into the League of Secessionist States. As of 2011, the LoSS claimed to have some 40 member states.

== See also ==
- Antarctic Micronational Union
- Organisation de la microfrancophonie
