= Attempts to claim Bir Tawil as a sovereign state =

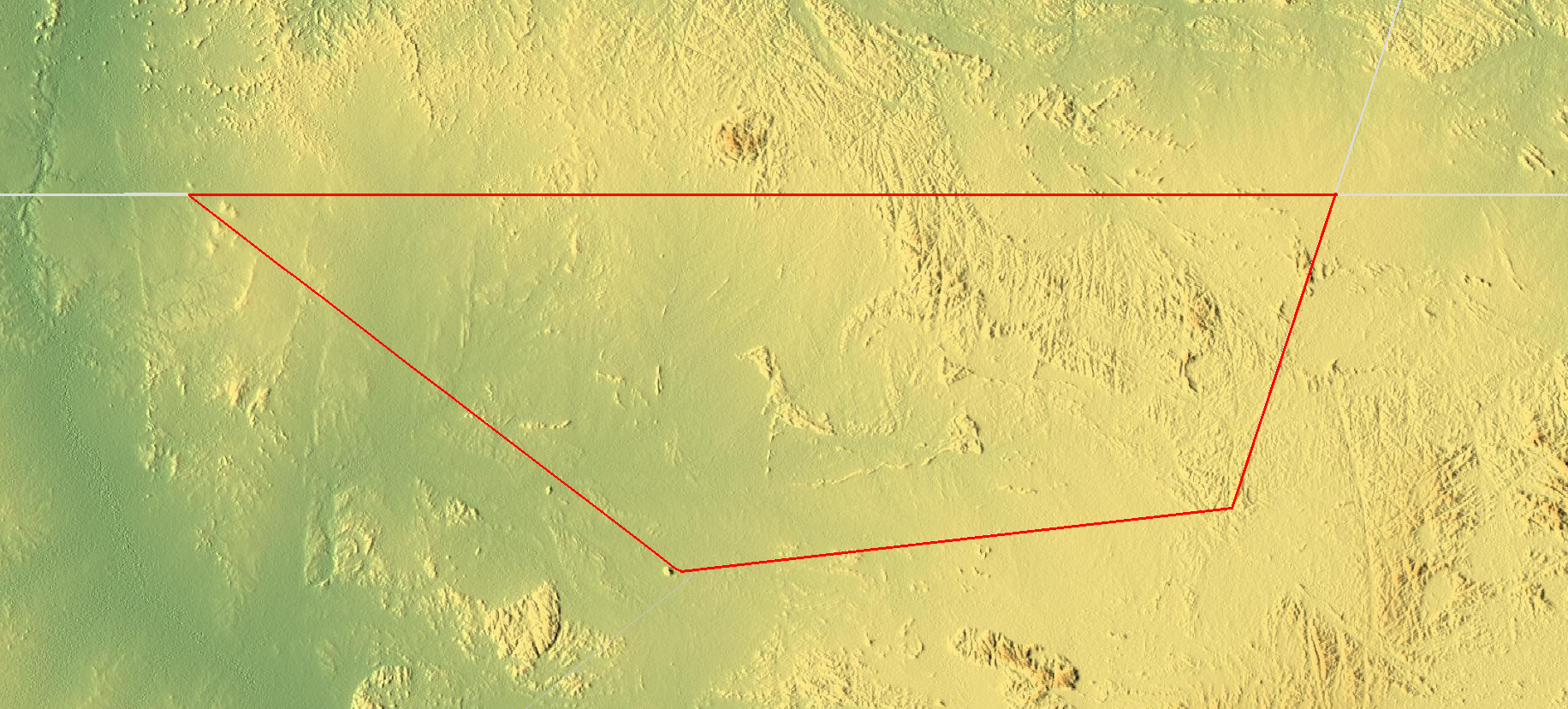
Topographic map of Bir Tawil (outlined in red)

Bir Tawil is a landlocked tract of land lying between Egypt and Sudan that, owing to the nature of a border dispute between the two countries, is claimed by neither. Due to its status as de jure unclaimed territory, a number of individuals and organizations have attempted to claim it as a micronation. Because of the remoteness and hostile climate of the region, the vast majority of these claims have been declared online from other locations. No claim has been recognized by any government or international organization. Claims made by the attempted settlers have received large amounts of media attention.

== Claimants ==
=== Jeremiah Heaton ===
A movie poster of the documentary The King of North Sudan

Flag of the Kingdom of North Sudan, the micronation declared by Heaton

In June 2014, Jeremiah Heaton, a 39-year-old farmer from Virginia, United States arrived at Bir Tawil and declared the formation of the Kingdom of North Sudan. Heaton's motives included making his daughter, Emily, a princess. Heaton had reportedly agreed on a deal with Walt Disney Studios and Morgan Spurlock to produce a movie titled The Princess of North Sudan. Heaton showed interest in founding the world's first "crowd-funded nation", offering titles of nobility and other naming rights for contributors. A documentary based on Heaton's story, The King of North Sudan, premiered at the Austin Film Festival in 2021. Eamon Tracy of the Irish Film Critic reviewed the documentary as "the most insane documentary seen this year".

=== Suyash Dixit ===
Flag of the Kingdom of Dixit

In November 2017, Suyash Dixit, a 24-year-old Indian businessman from Indore, travelled to Bir Tawil, declaring it the Kingdom of Dixit and requesting recognition from the United Nations. Flying from Cairo to Abu Simbel, he reached Bir Tawil on November 4 via a rental car and planted sunflower seeds in the desert. According to Business Insider, Dixit subsequently declared himself king, styling himself as King Suyash I.

=== Dmitry Zhikharev ===
In November 2017, a day after Suyash Dixit laid his claim, a Russian DJ, Dmitry Zhikharev, claimed Bir Tawil as the "Kingdom of Middle Earth" inspired by J.R.R. Tolkien's books. He disputed the claims of both Jeremiah Heaton and Suyash Dixit, accusing them of fabricating their visits to Bir Tawil. Zhikharev claimed to have visited the territory in December 2014, declaring himself ruler. He announced that he would establish infrastructure in the region, including plans to drill for water.

=== Nadera Nassif ===
In September 2019, a group with an unknown monarch and a "Prime Minister", Nadera Nassif, a Lebanese-American businesswoman with companies based in Michigan, claimed the existence of the "Kingdom of the Yellow Mountain". With its web servers based in Saudi Arabia, its main reason for its existence was explained as to providing aid towards refugees. Jeremiah Heaton has denounced the organization's leader as a "mentally unhealthy person". Foreign Policy remarked that the organization was more professionally designed than the former attempts to claim Bir Tawil.

=== Dwain Coward ===
In 2021, Dwain Coward, a barrister from South London, claimed the territory of Bir Tawil. Coward established a company in Sudan to further his efforts. Coward stated that the goal of his operation was to put legislation in place to protect the territory from mercury pollution by gold miners and dismantle the regional mining black market.

== Reactions ==
The United Nations has not recognized any of the claimants as Bir Tawil's legitimate ruler. A spokesman for the UN secretary-general told The Washington Post that the UN's role did not include defining a country's borders. The Washington D.C. embassies of Egypt and Sudan did not respond to comments requested by Al Jazeera.

The local population, notably some groups of the nomadic Ababda people who do cross this area, have reacted unfavorably to attempts to claim their lands over the internet. While they mostly welcomed rare visitors, they also claim to be armed well enough to repel foreign occupiers.
