= How to Start Your Own Country (book) =

1979 book by Erwin S. Strauss

- Book cover as of the third edition
- Author: Erwin S. Strauss
- Language: English
- Subject: Micronationalism
- Publisher: Loompanics (second edition); Paladin Press (third edition)
- Publication date: 1979 (first edition); 1984 (second edition); 1999 (third edition)
- Publication place: United States
- Media type: Print
- Pages: 167
- ISBN: 978-1-58160-524-2

How to Start Your Own Country is an American non-fiction book written by Erwin S. Strauss about micronationalism, particularly its application to libertarianism and individualism. Strauss, who holds libertarian views, believes in the abolition of the power of the state. In How to Start Your Own Country, Strauss introduces five approaches that micronations may take in an attempt to achieve statehood, and documents various micronations and their mostly unsuccessful attempts at seceding. The first book published about micronations, How to Start Your Own Country was published in 1979, with subsequent editions in 1984 by Loompanics and in 1999 by Paladin Press. The book was well received by critics.

== Background and publication ==
Erwin S. Strauss is an American science fiction author with libertarian views, particularly individual freedom and the abolition of the power of the state. How to Start Your Own Country explores various micronations and their mostly unsuccessful attempts at seceding. Micronations are political entities that claim independence and mimic acts of sovereignty as if they were a real country, but lack any legal recognition. They are classified separately from states with limited recognition or quasi-states as they lack the legal basis in international law for their existence.

Strauss gave the work a do-it-yourself title so as to maximise its effect in regards to libertarianism and personal autonomy. The International Micropatrological Society, a research institute dedicated to the study of micronations, contributed research and photographs. (Note: Strauss 1999, "front matter") The earliest book about micronations, How to Start Your Own Country was first published in 1979, with subsequent editions in 1984 by Loompanics and in 1999 by Paladin Press. The second edition included the addition of a preface and over one hundred additional pages. It has also been subtitled How You Can Profit from the Decline of the Nation State or How You Can Profit from the Coming Decline of the Nation State.

== Content ==
How to Start Your Own Country is 167 pages long, and discusses over 100 micronations. The book includes photographs of the micronations, their leaders, currencies and flags.

Strauss introduces five approaches that micronations may take in an attempt to achieve statehood. The first, which the author calls "traditional sovereignty", is done by claiming a territory and seeking diplomatic recognition from an international organisation or world government. For micronations based on vessels, a second approach involves registering a flag of convenience but declaring the ship as sovereign. Approach three revolves around declaring independence and fighting the parent country's response in the court of law. Strauss writes that one must appeal to the media and public for support in order for this approach to hold merit. The fourth approach involves residing in a secluded area and refraining from interaction with authorities, without formally seceding or declaring independence. The fifth approach is the "model country" approach, in which one builds and operates a micronation while still paying taxation and abstaining from unnecessary hostility to avoid persecution. Next, Strauss writes about the organisation and running of one's micronation, followed by a chapter on his thoughts on the future of micronationalism. The final chapter—"Case Studies"—profiles several micronations, elements of micronationalism and other related organisations, in alphabetical order. (Note: Strauss 1999, pp. 51–155)

== Critical reception and aftermath ==
Susan Morgan of Real Life Magazine wrote in 1985 that in How to Start Your Own Country, Strauss takes "the self-help individualism of Americans (and marginals) to its ultimate", positively comparing the book to Strauss' other work Basement Nukes: The Consequences of Cheap Weapons of Mass Destruction (1980). Jesse Walker, writing for The American Conservative in 2007, called it "the classic guide to such societies [micronations]" and noted that How to Start Your Own Country has been built upon by several websites and by the book Micronations: The Lonely Planet Guide to Home-Made Nations (2006). He further noted that the work offered a "surprisingly extensive discussion of micronational defence". Lauren Davis of Gizmodo briefly noted in 2014 that despite its age, How to Start Your Own Country remains "a rather interesting, if sometimes tongue-in-cheek, read".

Strauss was interviewed in 2005 by humorist Danny Wallace as part of the unrelated BBC comedy documentary series How to Start Your Own Country. In 2009, Strauss gave a presentation on micronational seasteading attempts at the 2009 Seasteading Conference by the Seasteading Institute. Canadian filmmaker Jody Shapiro was inspired to make an eponymous documentary about micronations after discovering a copy of How to Start Your Own Country in a book store. The film premiered at the 35th Toronto International Film Festival in 2010.

== See also ==
- Bibliography of works on micronationalism
