= Principality of Snake Hill =

Australian micronation

- Micronation (unrecognised entity)
- Area claimed: 2 km^{2} (0.77 sq mi)
- Claimed by: Helena and Paul Jensen
- Dates claimed: 2 September 2003–present

The Principality of Snake Hill, also known simply as Snake Hill, is a micronation located near Mudgee in New South Wales, Australia. Snake Hill has roughly hundreds of citizens, and claims land the size of Monaco. Snake Hill claimed independence on 2 September 2003. It is not recognized by any government.

== History ==
The Jensen family of New South Wales could no longer afford to pay taxes, and after litigation over a mortgage and being inspired by the Principality of Hutt River, they declared independence on 2 September 2003.

The micronation was featured in Lonely Planet's Micronations: The Lonely Planet Guide to Home-Made Nations, published in 2006.

Helena Jensen took leadership of Snake Hill after the death of her husband, Paul Jensen, in 2010. That same year, her daughter Paula was invited by Judy Lattas of Macquarie University and George Cruickshank of the Empire of Atlantium as a guest speaker at the intermicronational summit PoliNation at Dangar Island in Sydney.

The financial issues that prompted the Jensens to secede remained unaddressed and eventually led the Bank of Queensland to foreclose on their home and "embassy", a property named Castle Hill in Melaleuca Close, in 2011. Sale of the property was frustrated by the Snake Hillers' demands for "caveats" and their argument that the bank's actions were outside the jurisdiction of the court, and that it was a matter of international law and must be referred to the High Court of Australia or the International Court of Justice. These claims were dismissed by a judge of the Supreme Court of New South Wales in late February 2011. Paula Jensen continued to appear frequently in courts within New South Wales between 2011 and 2014.

== See also ==
- List of micronations
