= How to Start Your Own Country =

2005 British television series

- Genre: Documentary; Comedy; Reality
- Created by: Danny Wallace
- Presented by: Danny Wallace
- Theme music composer: Banks & Wag
- Country of origin: United Kingdom
- Original language: English
- No. of series: 1
- No. of episodes: 6

Production
- Executive producers: Garfield Kennedy; Julian Pearson
- Producer: Lee Philips
- Production location: London
- Running time: 30 minutes
- Production company: Leafstorm Ltd.

Original release
- Network: BBC Two
- Release: 3 August – 6 September 2005

Related
- Are You Dave Gorman?

How To Start Your Own Country is a British six-part documentary comedy series aired between August and September 2005. The show was presented by British comedian Danny Wallace and followed his quest to start his own country in his flat in Bow, London. The micronation he created was eventually named "Kingdom of Lovely".

The series was released on DVD in the UK on 18 June 2007.

== Episodes ==
=== "Birth of a Nation" ===
Danny investigates territory for his new country, starting by visiting Sealand. He also meets Erwin Strauss and Dennis Hope, a man who claims to own the Moon. He "invades" Eel Pie Island but leaves after the police are called. He befriends a British Army General. He eventually decides upon the area of his flat as the territory and makes a declaration of independence, which he sends to the Prime Minister.

=== "Citizens Required" ===
With the help of an advertising agency, Wallace chooses a design for the flag of his country. He records a national anthem, which is played during his interview on Iain Lee's LBC show.

=== "For King and Country" ===
Danny Wallace meets the SAS (Second Amendment Sisters) and meets the King of Fusa. He also goes to the Principality of Seborga.

=== "State of a Nation" ===
Wallace visits two very different 'utopian' communities, the planned town of Celebration which maintains its pleasantness through strict rules and regulations, and the anarchic self-governing neighborhood of Christiania. He also speaks to a Catholic Cardinal about the role of religion in society and Sheriff Joe Arpaio about law and order.

A sombre visit to death row and an interview with the death row chief, John George leads him to decide against the death penalty in his country.

=== "The Bank of Danny" ===
When he struggles to pay his electricity bill, Wallace begins to kick-start his country's economy. He investigates the National Debt, with advice from former Chancellor of the Exchequer Kenneth Clarke. He designs his own currency, the IOU (Interdependent Occupational Unit), which he shows to Andrew Bailey, the Chief Cashier at the Bank of England. He also discovers the Principality of New Utopia and interviews the UK Pro Consul, Tony Nicodemous. He applies for international aid, and fails, due to the wealth of his citizens.

=== "The United Nations" ===
Wallace attempts to enter the Eurovision Song Contest 2006 in Athens with a song called "Stop the Muggin', Start the Huggin'".

In an attempt to officially become a country, he travels to New York to try to win the support of the United Nations. The lack of territory lets him down.

This final episode ends with a gathering of citizens in Leicester Square, where Wallace reveals that the country is to be called "Lovely".

== Citizen TV ==
A show called Citizen TV, also presented by Danny Wallace, was shown to digital viewers after each episode, giving news and discussions about the country.

== Kingdom of Lovely ==
Kingdom of Lovely
- Micronation (unrecognized entity)
- Area claimed: Wallace's flat in Bow, East London
- Claimed by: Danny Wallace
- Dates claimed: 1 January 2005–19 May 2013

Wallace named his micronation the Kingdom of Lovely. Like several other micronations it was a partly Internet-based project that claimed a small amount of territory. Wallace proclaimed himself King and, at its peak, 58,165 "citizens" were registered on the micronation's website citizensrequired.com. This site is no longer active.

The sole official territory of Lovely was Wallace's flat in Bow, East London, but citizens of Lovely were invited to declare a room, or some other building or land belonging to them, to be an embassy for the country by taking a photograph displaying Lovely's flag there.

The show depicted Wallace attempting to acquire various accoutrements of statehood for his fledgling nation. These included:

- The country's name. Wallace solicited ideas online and put his two favourites "Home" and "Lovely" to a vote.
- A national holiday: "Lovely Day" on 2 September, celebrating the nation's naming.
- A flag featuring a blue stripe and a red stripe at erratic angles on a white background.
- A pixelated coat of arms to reflect the Internet-based nature of the micronation
- A Latin motto: Die Dulci freure (sic – the correct Latin is fruere), meaning "Have a nice day".
- A national anthem performed by Banks & Wag.

When the owners of a private island in Ireland rejected Lovely's currency (The "Interdependent Occupational Unit (IOU)") as a basis for sale, Wallace tried to start his nation by "invading" Eel Pie Island in London with the help of his friend Jon Bond, now Lovely's Minister of Defence. Bond was chosen for the role having once worked as a security guard at Tesco, making him the closest thing Wallace had to an army. However, the Metropolitan Police were contacted by local people, and Wallace was forced to call off the "invasion". After speaking to several people including the leaders of Sealand and Dennis Hope, who claims to own the Moon, Wallace declared his flat to be a sovereign nation on 1 January 2005 and he set about populating the micronation and recording the television series. Other notable interviewees included democracy advocate Noam Chomsky, Sheriff Joe Arpaio of Maricopa County, Arizona, Giorgio Carbone, Prince of Seborga, Major General Andrew Graham and Erwin Strauss, author of the guidebook How to Start Your Own Country.

During the broadcasting run of How to Start Your Own Country, additional material was broadcast to digital TV viewers after each episode. This took the style of a national broadcast named Citizen TV. It was presented live by Danny Wallace and featured news, a special guest (usually a member of Wallace's government), and conversations with "citizens" who had called in. An early political change occurred when Wallace fired his first foreign minister live on-air and appointed citizen Kieran Collins in his place.

Wallace attempted to submit a song of his own composition, Stop The Mugging, Start The Hugging, as the Lovely entry to the Eurovision Song Contest 2006. The contest's scrutineer, Svante Stockselius, met with Wallace and was sympathetic to his cause but informed him that Lovely could not enter the Contest as it has no national television or radio station of its own and therefore could not join the European Broadcasting Union (EBU). Wallace then submitted his song to the BBC (which is an EBU member who supports the UK entry to the contest), in an attempt to receive their backing – their judges, however, were unimpressed.

The series also showed Wallace's attempts to gain official recognition for Lovely at the United Nations, which was established to be the true mark of statehood. These efforts were unsuccessful, largely because of Lovely's lack of independent territory, Wallace's own flat being within the UK. Despite all this, Wallace appeared before his citizens in full regal attire in the final episode, declaring that their new country now had more citizens than seven internationally recognized countries, including Vatican City, Monaco, and Liechtenstein.

The Guardian Angel, a Lovelian citizen-run newspaper, operated between September 2005 and September 2007.

Wallace did not continue to manage the micronation after the series aired. On Wallace's website, he describes the show as gaining "an almost-too-loyal fanbase, several of whom take against me when I am unable to dedicate my entire life to running a small country from my flat."

== See also ==
- Micronations
- List of micronations
- Flags of micronations
- Micronations: The Lonely Planet Guide to Home-Made Nations
