= Talossa =

Micronation in Milwaukee, Wisconsin, US

- Micronation (unrecognized entity)
- Area claimed: East Side Milwaukee, Wisconsin, United States; Cézembre; Marie Byrd Land
- Claimed by: Robert Ben Madison
- Dates claimed: 26 December 1979–present
- Website https://talossa.com

Talossa, also known as the Kingdom of Talossa (Talossan: Regipäts Talossan [ˈred͡ʒipæt͡s tɐɫɔˈsan]), is one of the earliest micronations – founded in 1979 by then-14-year-old Robert Ben Madison of Milwaukee and at first confined to his bedroom; he adopted the name after discovering that the word means "inside the house" in Finnish. Among the first such projects still maintained, it has kept up a web presence since 1995. Its internet and media exposure since the late 1990s contributed to the appearance of other subsequent internet micronations.

Talossa claims several places on Earth as its territory, especially a portion of Milwaukee, calling it the "Greater Talossan Area"; no such claim, however, is recognized by the United Nations or by any sovereign nation. As of 5 August 2023, the number of active citizens is said to be 157. Including those who are no longer citizens for various reasons, those who are under the age of 14 and so are not yet citizens, and those from the ESB Affair there are 564 total registered individuals. The current King of Talossa is Sir Txec Róibeard dal Nordselvá, who in December 2024 succeeded John I.

== Culture ==
Talossan culture has been developed over the years by Robert Madison and other fans. The Talossan language, also created by Madison in 1980, claims a vocabulary of 35 000 root words and 121 000 derived words – including fieschada ([fjeˈʃaðə]), meaning "love at first sight".

== History and growth ==
Talossa was founded as a kingdom on 26 December 1979, by Madison, shortly after the death of his mother. Madison maintained Talossa throughout his adolescence, publishing a handwritten newspaper and designing a flag and emblem. During this time its only other members were about a dozen relatives and acquaintances. This changed in the mid-1990s, when a series of stories in the New York Times and Wired, subsequently republished elsewhere, drew his website to popular attention. Several new "citizens" joined Talossa as a result, and Madison began to claim that he was the inventor of the term "micronation".

In April 1996, Madison reestablished the dormant League of Secessionist States—an intermicronational organisation originally founded by him and two friends in 1980—and launched a website for it. Between 1997 and at least 2000, it was the most prominent intermicronational organisation on the Internet.

Madison disestablished the "kingdom" in late 2005, but Talossa is still active today despite the lack of involvement of the original founder.

Madison registered "Talossa" as a service mark in 2005 and created Talossa, Inc., a Wisconsin not-for-profit corporation. By 2013 the service mark had been cancelled and the corporation had been administratively dissolved.

== Talossan language ==
Talossan
- Talossan
- Pronunciation: [tɐɫɔˈsan]
- Created by: Robert Ben Madison
- Date: 1980
- Setting and usage: Talossa
- Purpose: Constructed languages: Artistic languages; Talossan
- Writing system: Latin (Talossan alphabet)
- Sources: a posteriori language (Romance)

Official status
- Regulated by: La Società per l'Ilesnaziun del Glheþ Naziunal

Language codes
- ISO 639-3: tzl
- Glottolog: talo1253

Madison invented Talossan ([tɐɫɔˈsan] or el glheþ Talossan [ɛɫ ʎeθ tɐɫɔˈsan]) as a constructed language for his micronation. With its relatively large vocabulary, which is mostly French-based, it has been described at least once as one of the most detailed fictional languages ever invented. The former Association of Talossan Language Organisations (ATLO) maintained a website describing the language for new learners, providing language information, research and online translation to and from English. The ISO 639 designation is "tzl". That website is now deprecated, and new resources will be created with the formation of la Società per l'Ilesnaziun del Glheþ Naziunal (Society for the Facilitation of the National Language, SIGN).

The language was overseen by the Comità per l'Útzil del Glheþ ("Committee for the Use of the Language," CÚG), a group formed by Madison which periodically issued both Arestadas (decrees) to describe and document changes in language usage of the language and Pienamaintschen (supplements), to update the vocabulary list. The CÚG maintained a multi-lingual website providing access to the recent recommendations of the committee.

== See also ==
- Constructed language (conlang)
- List of micronations

== Literature ==
- Clemens J. Setz: Die Bienen und das Unsichtbare, Suhrkamp Verlag, Berlin 2020, pp. 174–184.
