= Arisia =

New England (US) science fiction/fantasy convention

- Status: Active
- Genre: Science fiction
- Venue: Westin Boston Waterfront (2011–2018, 2020, 2023)
- Locations: Boston, Massachusetts
- Country: United States
- Inaugurated: 1990
- Attendance: 2017: 4,563 (registered); 4,299 (attended)
- Organizer: The Arisia Corporation
- Filing status: Non-profit
- Website: www.arisia.org

Arisia is a Boston-area, volunteer-run science fiction convention, named for a planet in the Lensman novels by E. E. "Doc" Smith. The name was chosen in response to an older Boston-area con, Boskone, which took the typical ending for a convention — con — and then altered the spelling to match the name of an organization in the Lensmen books.

Arisia was first held in 1990, and its attendance has grown from 842 to over 4,000. Arisias 2000–2006 were held at the Park Plaza Hotel in downtown Boston, and Arisias 2007–2010 were held at the Hyatt Regency in Cambridge, Massachusetts. From 2011 to 2018, the convention was held at the Westin Boston Waterfront. In 2019, Arisia moved back to the Boston Park Plaza Hotel temporarily as a result of a strike at Boston-area Marriott properties, including the Westin. Later that year after a legal dispute, Arisia agreed to return to the Westin for the 2020 convention, and also signed a contract for the Westin to host through 2023. Due to the COVID-19 pandemic, the convention was held online only in 2021 and 2022, returning to the renamed Westin Boston Seaport District in 2023 and 2024, and is scheduled to return to the Hyatt Regency Boston / Cambridge for 2025.

Regular events include one of the largest Masquerades (costume contests) on the East Coast; "Fast Track" programming for children; a demonstration of historical fighting techniques; gaming; film, video, and anime rooms; and a Friday night Kabbalat Shabbat Jewish prayer service. Other events that have been recently included are a blood drive, a drumming circle, Friday and Saturday evening dances, and live radio dramas.

The Arisia Corporation is the body that funds and promotes the annual Arisia convention; additional activities include awarding grants to other related organizations. Corporate membership costs $24 per year starting in September, pro-rated for members who join during later months. Corporate positions are elected by the voting body (defined as members who have attended one previous corporate meeting) in September. Meetings are held monthly and are open to the public.
