= Kingdom of Elleore =

Micronation in Denmark

Coordinates: 55.6860°N 12.0610°E

- Micronation (unrecognized entity)
- Location: Roskilde Fjord, Denmark
- Area claimed: 0.015 km^{2} (0.0058 sq mi)
- Type: Island
- Claimed by: A group of Copenhagen schoolteachers
- Dates claimed: 27 August 1944–present
- Website elleore.dk

The Kingdom of Elleore is a micronation located on the island of Elleore in the Roskilde Fjord, north of Roskilde on the Danish island of Zealand.

== History ==
During the German occupation of Denmark, the island was purchased by a group of Copenhagen schoolteachers in 1944 for use as a summer camp. They proclaimed the island's tongue-in-cheek "independence" as a Kingdom as a gentle parody of the government structure and royal traditions of Denmark. The teachers claim that the kingdom's ancestry can be traced to a "monastic society of Irish monks who arrived in the middle of the 10th century".

Prior to 1944, the island was known mainly as the location at which the controversial film Løvejagten was shot in 1907.

Numerous traditions peculiar to the kingdom have evolved over the subsequent decades, including a ban on the novel Robinson Crusoe, and the use of "Elleore Standard Time", which is 12 minutes behind Danish time. Many of the place names on the island, the kingdom's "government" and the titles assumed by its "nobility" are parodies of Danish equivalents.

The kingdom has issued several stamps and coins.

== Geography and demographics ==
The island has been estimated to be approximately 15,000 square metres (3.7 acres) in size. Elleore is unoccupied save for a week-long annual gathering attended by dozens of its "citizens" and known as the "Elleuge" (meaning "Elle week"). The ceremonial enthronement of the reigning monarch takes place at this time. The purported capital is the tented town of Maglelille, erected only during the week of habitation.

== Kings and queens of Elleore ==
Elleore has had seven monarchs since its inception.

- Erik I (1945–1949)
- Leo I den Lille (1949–1960)
- Erik II den Storartede (1961–1972)
- Leo II den Folkekære (1972–1983)
- Leodora den Dydige (1983–2003)
- Leo III (2003–2022)
- Finn I (2022–present)

== See also ==
- Micronation
- List of micronations
- Freetown Christiania
