= How to Start Your Own Country (film) =

2010 Canadian documentary

- Toronto International Film Festival poster
- Directed by: Jody Shapiro
- Written by: Shapiro; Denis Seguin
- Produced by: Phyllis Laing; Shapiro
- Cinematography: John Gurdebeke
- Edited by: Robert Swartz
- Music by: Howie Beck
- Production companies: Buffalo Gal Pictures; Everyday Pictures
- Release date: 10 September 2010 (TIFF)
- Running time: 72 minutes
- Country: Canada
- Language: English

How to Start Your Own Country is a 2010 Canadian documentary film directed by Jody Shapiro and written by Shapiro and Denis Seguin. Produced by Phyllis Laing and Shapiro, the film explores various aspects of micronationalism and features interviews with several prominent micronationalists. The production studios for the film are Buffalo Gal Pictures and Everyday Pictures. How to Start Your Own Country had its world premiere at the 35th Toronto International Film Festival on 10 September 2010.

== Premise ==
How to Start Your Own Country explores various micronations around the world, including the themes of sovereignty, citizenship and seasteading. It also features interviews with numerous micronationalists, academics, politicians and a representative of the United Nations. The featured micronations include the New Free State of Caroline, Republic of Molossia, Kingdom of North Dumpling, Principality of Sealand and the Principality of Seborga.

== Production ==
Jody Shapiro was inspired to make the documentary after discovering a copy of How to Start Your Own Country by Erwin Strauss in a book store. Shapiro elaborated: "The more I talked about the concept, the more I realised people didn't know this sort of thing existed - that individuals all over the world were claiming to start countries of their own. So I thought this would make a really interesting documentary." Shapiro and his team spent the next eight months travelling to sixteen micronations around the world.

The soundtrack was composed by Howie Beck.

== See also ==
- How to Start Your Own Country
- Rose Island (film)
