= Boskone =

Annual science fiction convention in Boston (first held 1941)

- Status: Active
- Genre: Science fiction
- Locations: Boston, Massachusetts, U.S.
- Country: United States
- Inaugurated: 1941
- Organizer: New England Science Fiction Association
- Filing status: 501(c)(3)
- Website: nesfa.org/boskone

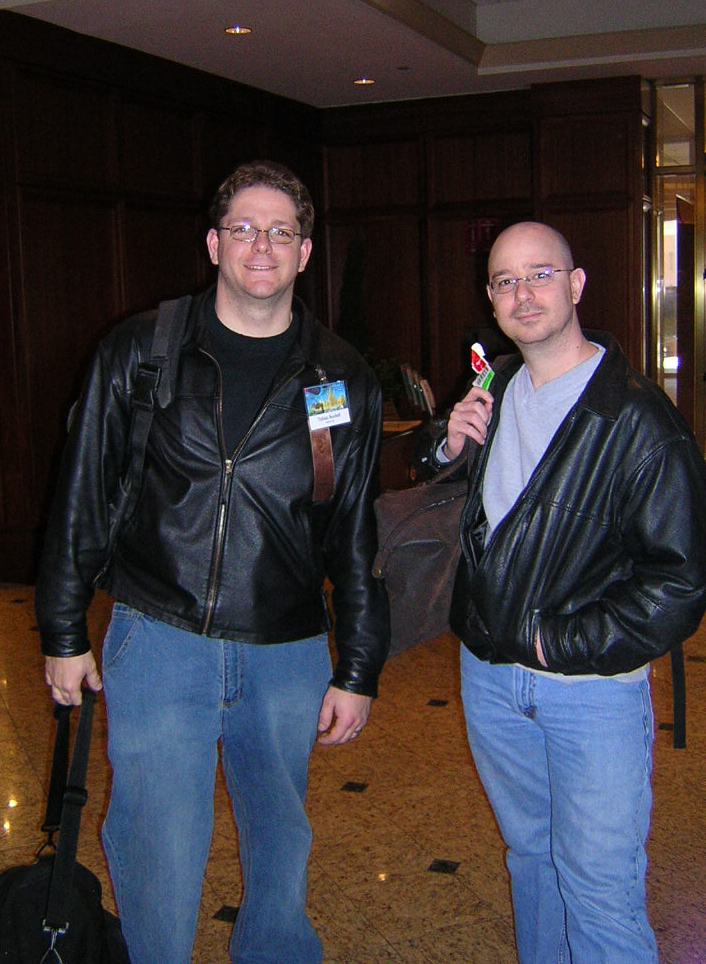
Tobias Buckell and John Scalzi at Boskone 43, 2006

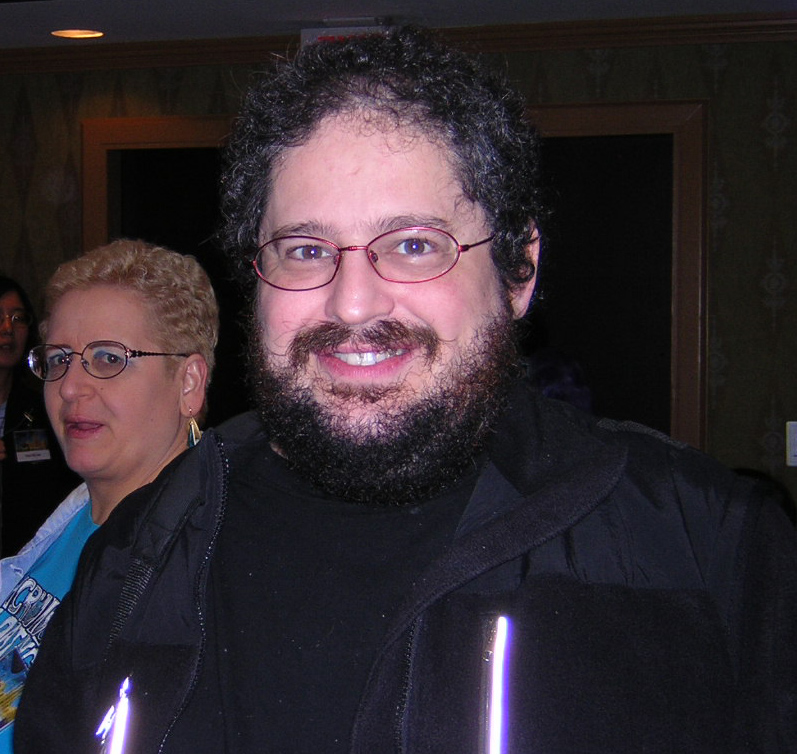
Charles Stross at Boskone, 2006

Boskone is an annual science fiction convention ("con") run by the New England Science Fiction Association (NESFA) in Boston, Massachusetts, United States. In the words of the convention organizers, "Boskone is a regional Science Fiction convention focusing on literature, art, music, and gaming (with just a dash of whimsy)". It is held every February, in Boston. The name is a reference to the Lensman series by E. E. Smith, in which "Boskone" is a council of villains, and also a name for their civilization. The obvious name for a con in Boston would, of course, be "Boscon"; the similarity was noticed and embraced. Continuing the trend, when a new Boston-area convention was formed, the organizers of that event named it "Arisia".

== History ==
Boskone I was held in 1941 under the auspices of The Stranger Club, an earlier Boston-based SF club. Four more were held annually, ending with Boskone V in 1945. The current series of Boskones started in 1965 with Boskone I again (still using Roman numerals until Boskone XXVIII and then using Arabic numerals beginning with Boskone 29) and continued without interruption to the present. Boskones 1, 2, and 4 were run by BosSFS, the now-defunct Boston Science Fiction Society. The then-newly formed NESFA took over with Boskone 5. The tradition of holding Boskone in February started in 1976.

In the 1980s, Boskone exploded in popularity—gaining a reputation as the "Winter Worldcon," and surpassing the attendance of the World Science Fiction Convention in both 1985 and 1987—peaking at an attendance of 4200 for Boskone XXIV in 1987. Seeking to pull back to a more modest convention, the organizers deemphasized movie and media-related activities and moved Boskone out of Boston to Springfield for five years and then to Framingham. The convention would not return to Boston until 2003, and has yet to again exceed 1400 attendees.

Boskone typically features a guest of honor, an official artist, a science speaker, a featured filker, and a special guest. The Higgins Armory Museum and other Historical European martial arts groups have held demonstrations and classes.

== See also ==
- Science fiction fandom
