= Erwin Strauss =

American writer

Erwin S. Strauss is an American author, science fiction fan, noted member of the MITSFS, and filk musician, born in Washington, D.C. He frequently is known by the nickname "Filthy Pierre". He was injured descending a stairway at SMOFcon 41 in December 2023, and in January 2024 announced his retirement.

== Science fiction and writing ==
Strauss has been chairman of a number of science fiction conventions, such as Boskone 3 in 1966 and RailCon in 1975; and a member of the committee for at least one Worldcon, Noreascon 3, in 1989. He was an early (1964) vice president of the MIT Science Fiction Society. In addition, he was the author of the monthly "SF Convention Calendar" in Isaac Asimov's Science Fiction magazine until the March 2024 issue, and his flyer racks ("Filthy boards") were seen at conventions all over the East Coast. He is the author and/or editor of a number of books, articles, and fanzines. He is a frequent Guest of Honor at SF conventions, including Arisia, Boskone, and Albacon. Strauss is the creator of the Voodoo board message board system once used at conventions such as Worldcons, WisCon, and Arisia.

== Libertarian publishing ==
Strauss is most well known in libertarian circles for his longstanding publication of The Connection, an amateur press association (APA). The APA was started under the name The Libertarian Connection by Durk Pearson and Sandy Shaw (using pseudonyms) in 1968. Strauss wrote for it as "Filthy Pierre" almost from the beginning, and in 1979 he took over as publisher. Although Strauss dropped the word "libertarian" from the title (to indicate that it was open to all participants), the strong libertarian perspective of the contributors remained. Strauss continued to publish it until 2023.

== Honors ==
- Magic Carpet Con, 1996: Co-Filk Guest of Honor
- ConChord 2002: Interfilk guest
- Noreascon 4 (2004): Special Committee Award
- Filk Hall of Fame (inducted 1998)
- Big Heart Award, 2004.
- Albacon 2012: Fan Guest of Honor
- Balticon 2018: Fan Guest of Honor
- Asimov Centennial Meetup 2020 — Panelist

== Publications ==
=== Books ===
- Filthy Pierre's Songs of MIT
- Filthy Pierre's Songs of Significance
- How to Start Your Own Country. Loompanics, 1979.
- Basement Nukes: The Consequences of Cheap Weapons of Mass Destruction
- Complete Guide to Science Fiction Conventions
- The Case Against a Libertarian Political Party. Loompanics, 1980.
- MIT Science Fiction Society's Index to the S-F Magazines, 1951–1965, 1966

=== APAs (amateur press association publications) ===
- The Connection (OE, 1979–2023)

=== Fanzines ===
- SF Convention Register (1974–96)
- Filthy Pierre's Microfilk (1975–83)
