= Aspirant state =

Polity seeking sovereignty

An aspirant state is a polity which seeks to achieve international recognition as a sovereign state. This can involve separatist polities seceding from their parent state with or without legal permission or individuals seeking to establish a novel state in what is considered international territory. Regardless of its founding circumstances, all aspirant states claim sovereignty over their claimed territory and seek formal recognition of their statehood in international society. Such an entity is only considered an aspirant state while it formally claims sovereignty but has not achieved international recognition as a sovereign state. Consequently, an aspirant state could be recognized by no other political entities or many other political entities, its status as an aspirant state or a sovereign state is subjective and there are multiple different theories which seek to delineate what qualifies as statehood.

Examples of aspirant states can include sovereignty seeking forms of: micronations, aspirant nations, disputed states, quasi-states, and proto-states.

== See also ==
- Deep state
- List of states with limited recognition
  - List of historical unrecognized states and dependencies
- Unrepresented Nations and Peoples Organization
