= Self-proclaimed monarchy =

Self-proclaimed role of power

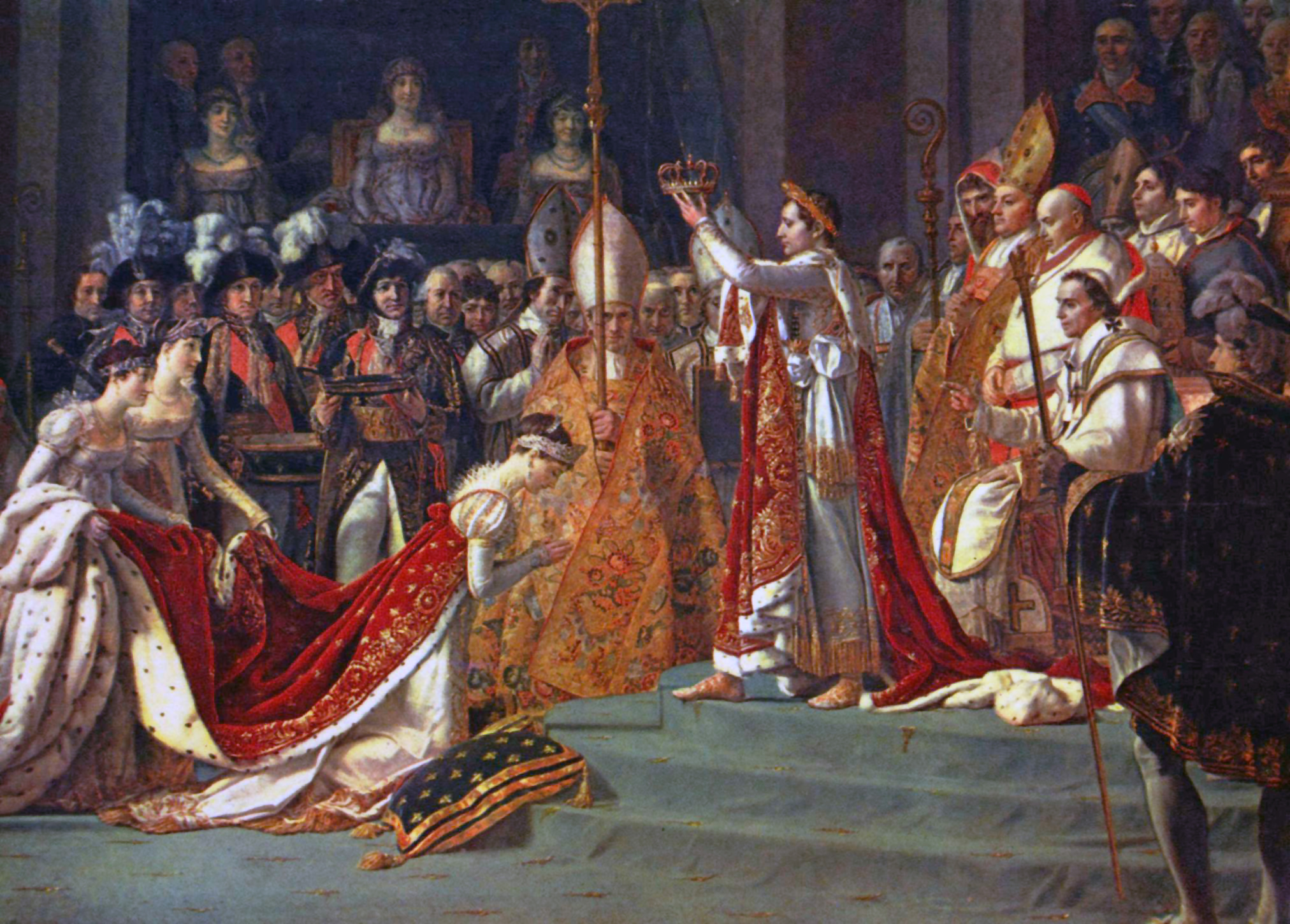
Coronation of Emperor Napoleon I of France at Notre-Dame de Paris. Napoleon crowned himself as "Emperor of the French" during this ceremony, then crowned his consort Josephine as Empress.

A self-proclaimed monarchy is established when a person claims a monarchy without any historical ties to a previous dynasty. In many cases, this would make them a pretender to the throne (when a ruling dynasty is already established). The self-proclaimed monarch may be of an established state, such as Zog I of Albania, or of a micronation, such as Leonard Casley of Hutt River, Western Australia.

== Past self-proclaimed monarchies ==
=== Albania ===
In 1928, Ahmet Zogu, a president of Albania, proclaimed himself "King Zog I". He ruled for 11 years in a nominally constitutional monarchy that was overthrown in the Italian invasion of Albania.

=== Andorra ===
In 1934, Boris Skossyreff declared himself "Boris I, King of Andorra". His pretended reign only lasted a few days. He was expelled when he declared war on Justí Guitart i Vilardebó, Bishop of Urgell and ex officio co-prince of Andorra.

=== Australia ===
In 1970, after a dispute over wheat production quotas, Leonard Casley proclaimed his wheat farm in Western Australia the "Principality of Hutt River", styling himself as "HRH Prince Leonard I of Hutt". The Australian government did not recognize his claim of independence. Casley abdicated in 2017, passing the principality to his son, "Prince Graeme I". The principality formally dissolved in 2020.

=== Cameroon ===
Lekeaka Oliver was a separatist rebel commander who fought in the Anglophone Crisis. In 2019, he proclaimed himself "Paramount Ruler" or "King" of Lebialem, a department of Cameroon. This move was condemned both by Cameroonian loyalists as well as other rebels. Oliver was killed in 2022.

=== Central African Republic ===
In 1976, a short-lived 'Imperial' monarchy, the "Central African Empire", was created when dictator Jean-Bédel Bokassa of the Central African Republic proclaimed himself "Emperor Bokassa I". The following year, he held a lavish coronation ceremony. He was deposed in 1979.

=== Chile ===
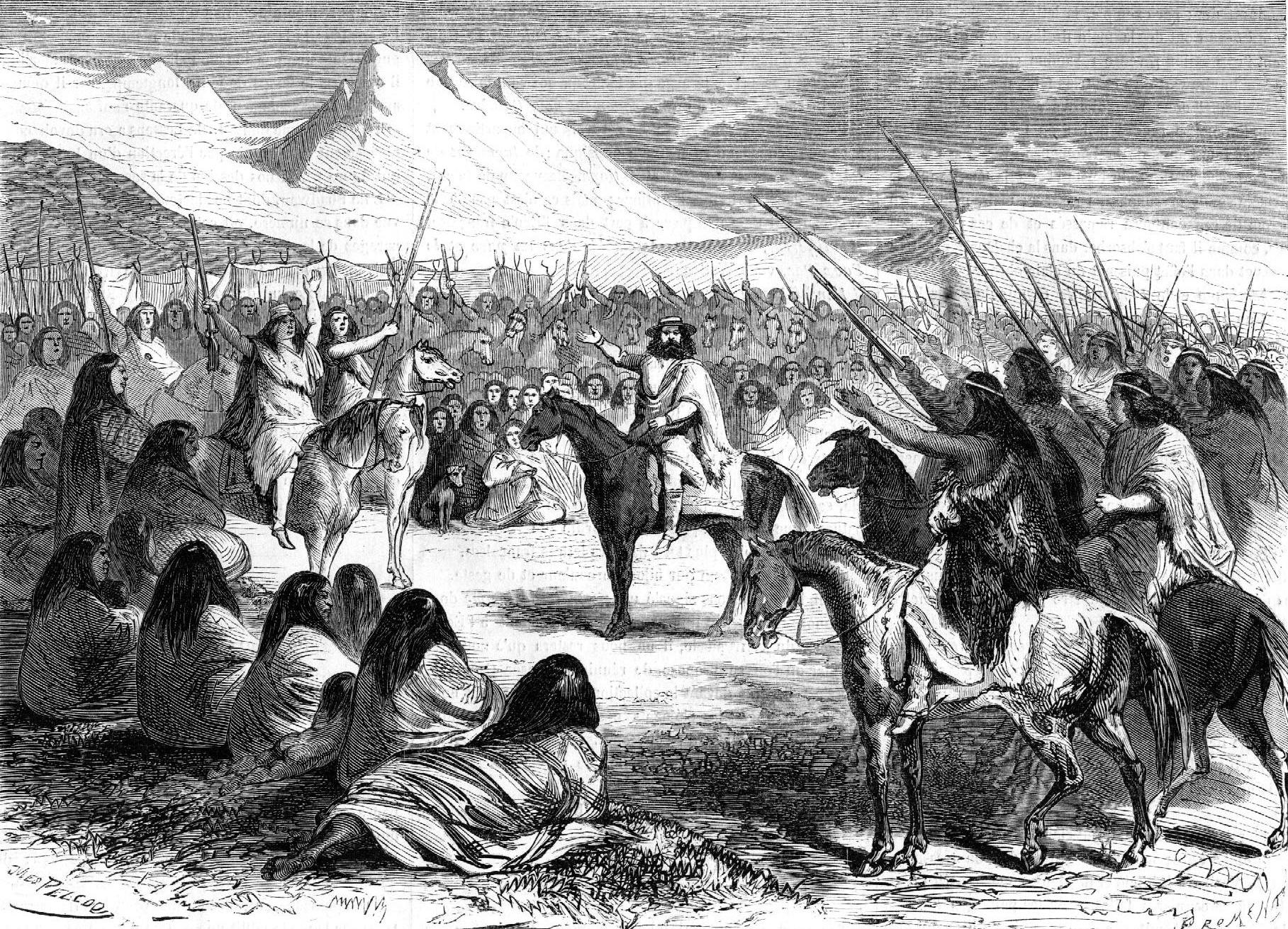
Antoine de Tounens with the Mapuche warriors

In 1860, a French adventurer, Orélie-Antoine de Tounens, proclaimed the "Kingdom of Araucanía" in Chile with the support of local Mapuche chiefs. He called himself "Orélie-Antoine I". In 1862, he was arrested and deported by the Chilean government.

=== China ===
Hong Xiuquan proclaimed himself the leader of the Taiping Heavenly Kingdom during the Taiping Rebellion in 1851.

In 1915, the president of China, Yuan Shikai, declared a restoration of the Chinese monarchy, with himself as emperor. The plan failed, and he was forced to step down.

Since then, there have been repeated attempts by individuals to declare themselves Chinese emperor or empress. In the 1920s and 1930s, there were several peasant rebels who declared themselves members of the House of Zhu and tried to restore the Ming dynasty, such as the self-proclaimed emperors "Chu the Ninth" (1919–1922, backed by the Yellow Way Society), "Wang the Sixth" (1924), and Chu Hung-teng (1925, backed by the Heavenly Gate Society). In course of the Spirit Soldier rebellions (1920–1926), a former farm worker and rebel leader named Yuan declared himself the "Jade Emperor". Following the Chinese Civil War, there have been hundreds of monarchist pretenders who oppose the Chinese Communist Party and often gathered small groups of supporters. Notable self-proclaimed monarchs include: Li Zhu, declared a new dynasty in 1954; Song Yiufang, leader of the Nine Palaces Way (crowned by his followers after sneaking into the Forbidden City in 1961); Yang Xuehua, empress of the Heavenly Palace Sect (arrested in 1976 and executed after allegedly planning a rebellion); Chao Yuhua, empress of the "Great Sage Dynasty" (crowned in 1988 in a factory); Tu Nanting, ex-soldier and emperor (believed in his emperorship after reading several books on prophecies, the arcane, and morals); Yang Zhaogong who attempted to establish a new dynasty with alleged backing of CCCPC members. In general, these self-proclaimed monarchs were not very successful and quickly arrested by security forces. However, one self-proclaimed emperor, Li Guangchang, organized a large sect of supporters and factually governed a small territory in Cangnan County, called the "Zishen Nation", from 1981 to 1986 in de facto independence from China. He was eventually arrested, reportedly after attempting to organize a wider rebellion.

=== Congo ===
Within days of being independent from Belgium, the new Republic of the Congo found itself torn between competing political factions, as well as by foreign interference. As the situation deteriorated, Moise Tshombe declared the independence of Katanga Province as the State of Katanga on 11 July 1960. Albert Kalonji, claiming that the Baluba were being persecuted in the Congo and needed their own state in their traditional Kasai homeland, followed suit shortly afterwards and declared the autonomy of South Kasai on 8 August, with himself as head. On 12 April 1961, Kalonji's father was granted the title Mulopwe (which roughly translates to "emperor" or "god-king"), but he immediately "abdicated" in favor of his son on 16 July. Albert Kalonji retained the title of Mulopwe and changed his name to Albert I Kalonji Ditunga. The move was controversial with members of Kalonji's own party and cost him much support.

Shortly thereafter, as preparation for the invasion of Katanga, Congolese government troops invaded and occupied South Kasai, and Kalonji was arrested. He escaped, but South Kasai ultimately returned to the Congo.

=== France ===
In 1736, Freiherr Theodor Stephan von Neuhof established himself as King of Corsica in an attempt to free the island of Corsica from Genoese rule.

On 18 May 1804, the French senate proclaimed Napoleon Bonaparte "Emperor of the French". Although this imperial regime ended with his fall from power, Napoleon's nephew, Louis-Napoléon Bonaparte, was elected in 1848 as President of France. In 1852, he declared himself "Emperor Napoleon III"; he was deposed in 1870.

=== Haiti ===
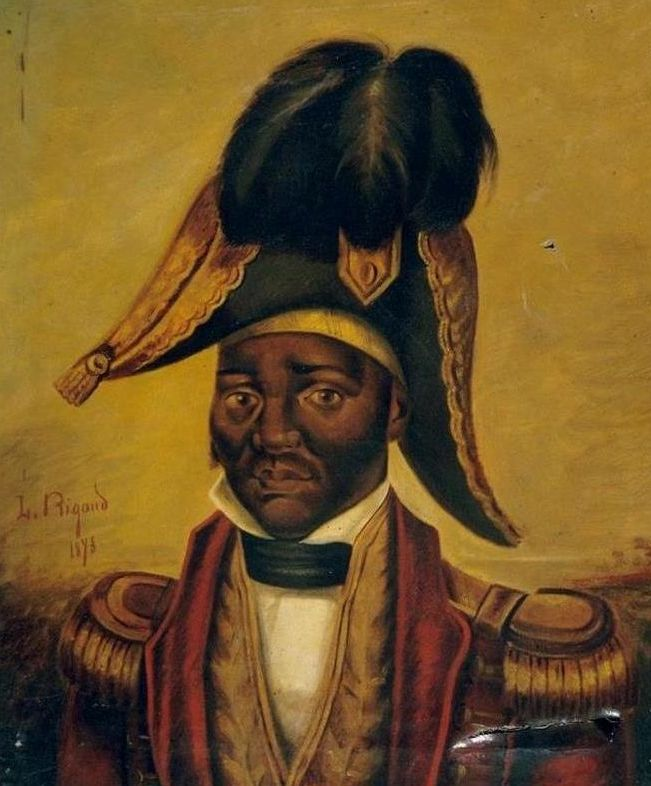
Jacques I, Emperor of Haiti, 1804

In 1804, in Haiti, the governor general, Jean-Jacques Dessalines, proclaimed himself "Emperor Jacques I". He ruled for two years. In 1811, the president, Henri Christophe, proclaimed himself "King Henri I" and ruled until 1820. In 1849, the president, Faustin Soulouque, proclaimed himself "Emperor Faustin I" and ruled until 1859.

=== Mexico ===
On 19 May 1822, Agustín Cosme Damián de Iturbide y Arámburu, was crowned as Emperor of Mexico. He was a Mexican-born general who had served in the Spanish Army, during the Mexican War of Independence, but switched sides and joined the Mexican rebels in 1820. He was proclaimed president of the Regency in 1821. When King Ferdinand VII of Spain refused to become a constitutional monarch, Iturbide was crowned Emperor. He ruled Mexico for less than as a year as he abdicated and went into exile during a revolt in March 1823. He returned to Mexico on 14 July 1824 and was executed by the Provisional Government of Mexico.

=== Romania ===
Florin Cioabă proclaimed himself King of the Roma Everywhere. He died in 2013.

=== Philippines ===
In 1823, in Manila, Philippines, a regimental captain, Andrés Novales, staged a mutiny and proclaimed himself "Emperor of the Philippines". After one day, Spanish troops from Pampanga and Intramuros removed him.

=== Trinidad ===
In 1893, James Harden-Hickey, an admirer of Napoleon III, crowned himself "James I of the Principality of Trinidad". For two years he tried but failed to assert his claim.

=== United States ===
In 1850, James J. Strang, who claimed to be Joseph Smith's successor as leader of the Latter Day Saint movement, proclaimed himself king of his followers on Beaver Island, Michigan. On 8 July 1850, he was crowned in an elaborate coronation ceremony. Strang evaded Federal government charges of treason and continued to rule until 1856, the year he was assassinated by two disgruntled "Strangites".

In 1859, Joshua Abraham Norton, a failed businessman from San Francisco, declared himself "Emperor of the United States", followed by assuming the additional title "Protector of Mexico" in 1863 in the wake of France's invasion of the country; he became and remained a local celebrity for the rest of his life.

== Current self-proclaimed monarchies ==
=== Germany ===
Several self-proclaimed monarchies exist in Germany within the context of the Reichsbürger movement in which some people declare themselves or their group the rightful rulers of the German Reich, a part thereof, or their own micronation. Notable figures in Germany include Peter Fitzek who was crowned 'Peter I of the Kingdom of Germany' in 2012 and Friedrich Maik who claims to be the head of state of Mecklenburg since 2019.

=== Italy ===
The Principality of Seborga (Italian: Principato di Seborga) is a micronation that claims a 14 square kilometres (5.4 mi^{2}) area located in the northwestern Italian Province of Imperia in Liguria, near the French border, and about 35 kilometres (22 mi) from Monaco. The principality is in coexistence with, and claims the territory of, the town of Seborga. In the early 1960s, Giorgio Carbone, began promoting the idea that Seborga restore its historic independence as a principality. By 1963 the people of Seborga were sufficiently convinced of these arguments to elect Carbone as their Head of State. He then assumed the style and title His Serene Highness Giorgio I, Prince of Seborga, which he held until his death in 2009. The Principality of Seborga is an elective monarchy and elections are held every seven years. The subsequent monarch was Prince Marcello Menegatto (Prince Marcello I) who ruled from 2010 to 2019. On 23 April 2017, Prince Marcello was re-elected and took office for another seven years, but abdicated the throne in 2019. Nina Menegatto was elected head of state as Princess Nina on 10 November 2019.

=== United Kingdom ===
In 1967, Paddy Roy Bates, a former major in the British Army, took control of Roughs Tower, a Maunsell sea fort situated off the coast of Suffolk and declared it the "Principality of Sealand". Upon his death in 2012, "Prince" Paddy Roy Bates was succeeded by his son, Michael.

=== Canada ===
Romana Didulo, a Filipina–Canadian woman, claimed to be the "secret Queen of Canada" in June 2021, and amassed a cult-like following, mainly consisting of right-wing QAnon supporters, being followed by 17,000 users of Telegram, a messaging platform favoured by the far-right and QAnon figures. She and her followers began to hand out "cease and desist" letters, demanding people and businesses stop following Canadian COVID-19 restrictions.

In an introductory video on Telegram, Didulo claimed to be "the founder and leader of Canada1st", an unregistered political party, and "the head of state and commander in chief of Canada, the Republic". She alleged that Canada's actual head of state, Queen Elizabeth II, had been secretly executed and that she had been appointed as Queen by "the same group of people who have helped president Trump", in reference to a common belief within the QAnon conspiracy theory. In reality, Elizabeth II died of natural causes on September 8, 2022.
