= Radio Newyork International =

Pirate radio station

Radio Newyork International (RNI)
- Broadcast area: New York, New Jersey and adjacent US states Worldwide
- Frequencies: 190 kHz LW; 1620 kHz MW; 6.24 MHz SW; 103.1 MHz FM

Programming
- Format: oldies

History
- First air date: July 1987 and October 1988

Technical information
- Power: variable. Capable of 5kW (AM), 300w (Shortwave), & 10kW (FM)

Radio Newyork International was the name of a pirate radio station which broadcast from a ship anchored in international waters off Long Beach, New York, United States in 1987 and 1988. The history of Radio Newyork International (RNI) is linked with the Falling Star Network and other New York City area pirate radio stations. The owner of RNI, Allan Weiner, is currently the licensee of WBCQ shortwave in Monticello, Maine.

== Brief history ==
=== John Ford and Allan Weiner ===
Allan Weiner of Monticello, Maine, United States, who had been a resident of Yonkers, New York, was a radio engineer who had operated both a licensed radio station and unlicensed transmitters. Eventually his radio license was revoked due to his unlicensed activities. Weiner was also familiar with the new Radio Caroline ship operation and he paid a visit to the ship in an attempt to install a shortwave service. During this visit he met John Hungerford, a US citizen who was a disc jockey on board the vessel under the name of John Ford. As a result of this meeting, Weiner, Ford and other associates decided to replicate Radio Caroline as Radio Newyork International from a ship to be anchored in international waters off Long Beach, New York.

=== Lichfield I ===
In 1987 Weiner and his associates came into possession of a vessel still legally registered as Lichfield I and owned by the Lichfield Shipping and Trading Company of Panama. This Japanese-built oceangoing fishing ship had originally suffered engine failure off the US coast, and it had been seized by US Customs when illegal drugs were found on board. Over a United States holiday period this vessel was sold to Frank Ganter (an associate of Weiner) for $100 using the amended name of Litchfield I, even though the vessel was still registered in Panama to its original owners under its correct name. Through this strange paper trail the vessel eventually came into the physical possession of Weiner, who renamed it yet again as Sarah after his ex-wife. Weiner then asked Hungerford to register this vessel under the name of Sarah with Honduran Consulate officials in New York. This registration was later considered to be fraudulent, and the Honduran officials deleted their registration.

It was during the brief period when the fraudulent Honduran entry had been created that this Panamanian ship, which lacked a working engine, was transformed into the home of Radio Newyork International by Weiner and Hungerford. While the station was actually called Radio New York International, the name contraction gave Weiner the opportunity to use of the old Radio Northsea International jingles and thus call their station RNI. The ship station had several transmitters and a studio on board, and it was towed to its location off Long Island by Frank Ganter using his tugboat the M/V Munzer. It was Ganter who had obtained the vessel from the U.S. Government officials and then sold it to Weiner for $30,000.

When broadcasting began the RNI signals were picked up over half of the United States; the first song they aired, fittingly, was "Come on Down to My Boat" by the 1960s band Every Mother's Son. Federal authorities did just that a few days later: they raided the Sarah and arrested Weiner, crew member Ivan Rothstein of Brooklyn, NY, and a reporter from The Village Voice. The trio were brought back to shore, and the station's broadcasting equipment was rendered unusable. Soon after, the Honduran Consulate nullified the ship registration when it was brought to their attention that the ship was not functioning as a commercial fishing vessel as its registrants had indicated.

=== Sealand ===
A federal court case began with a promise by Weiner that he would not broadcast again until the case against him had been heard in court. Weiner then traveled to England to visit a pirate radio convention in Blackpool, England and he was introduced to Michael Bates whose father (Roy Bates) had fought with personnel from Radio Caroline in the 1960s to take physical control of a sea fort which had been the World War II HM Fort Roughs. As a squatter on this disused installation Bates eventually declared it to be a sovereign country in its own right, Sealand. Weiner concluded an agreement with Michael Bates by selling the ship that he called Sarah (the real Lichfield I) to a British company organized by Bates at the address of his London accountant. In return Weiner claimed that Bates had reregistered the Sarah in the principality of Sealand.

=== Second US action ===
In 1988 the Sarah was towed from Boston back to its original anchorage off Long Island and began broadcasting once more. Weiner did not stay aboard this time due to court restrictions. Capt. Josh Hayl and another crew member, Reggie Boles manned the vessel. It was again stopped within days under threat of a new boarding by US authorities. The Sarah remained at its mooring for another twelve weeks, Capt. Josh Hayl waiting for orders to resume broadcasting from Weiner, however shore side legal proceedings could not prevent intervention from the United States Coast Guard.

=== Court cases ===
Beginning in late 1988, Weiner attempted to get a shortwave broadcasting license for a station which eventually became WBCQ at Monticello, Maine. At about the same time Weiner also entered into a contract to sell the entire radio ship to other buyers. In 1990 Weiner attended FCC Administrative Court hearings concerning both his application for a license and his previous land based and offshore illegal activities.

In preparation for these extensive court hearings the United States asked the UK Department of Trade and Industry (DTI), about the bogus registration of the Sarah with the entity that Roy Bates had called Sealand. At about the same time Weiner's federal court case for illegal broadcasting was also underway. As a part of his defense in that case his attorney cited Radio Caroline as an example of why offshore radio broadcasting was a legal enterprise. At the time of that hearing the new Radio Caroline ship was the host to three broadcasting services: one in the English language, another in the Dutch language and a third on a shortwave service started some time after Weiner's visit to the ship.

The shortwave service called World Mission Radio (WMR), advertised on air that its mailing address was in California, United States. On August 19, 1989, the Netherlands and British Radio Regulatory Authorities carried out a joint raid upon the Radio Caroline ship and destroyed or confiscated much of the broadcasting equipment. The authorities claimed that the unlicensed WMR shortwave service on 6215 kHz was causing interference to maritime communications.

During the 1990 Administrative Court hearings, all of these same matters were discussed once more and on the record. James Murphy, an investigator for the Office of Official Solicitor acting on behalf of the DTI who was involved in the raid on Radio Caroline to silence WMR, was also asked to provide a statement for the court about Sealand. Murphy performed a sworn document made under the laws of both the UK and the USA. In this document he stated that he was an Investigator for the office of the Official Solicitor acting on behalf of the Secretary of State for the DTI. He stated that he had personally carried out an investigation into the alleged Principality of Sealand and he further reported that it was neither a state nor an entity capable of registering ships. The court accepted this finding. At the conclusion of the hearing the Court denied Weiner his license but suggested that if he stayed out of trouble that he could reapply. Weiner appealed this decision and a year later the decision was upheld against him once again.

=== HavenCo and Ryan Lackey ===
Roy Bates never attempted to challenge the UK government over its findings for the United States court case and neither did he attempt to intervene in that case or file a brief of his own. Because the case was not known to the general public it was not known to US citizen Ryan Lackey when Roy Bates entered into a contract with him to establish the HavenCo internet project on Rough Tower which Bates called Sealand. However, it was because this case eventually came to his attention following his own discovery of the controversial claims made by Bates about the state that he claimed to have established, which then caused Ryan Lackey to leave the project.

=== Baskir and government raid ===
While his US court cases were ongoing, Weiner proceeded to try to sell the bogus Sarah to a consortium led by Genie Baskir of Virginia. The reason for the sale and attempted purchase was that Weiner had assured the US courts that he would not attempt to use the ship for offshore broadcasting, while Baskir had plans of her own. The first of these was to use the vessel as the home of Radio Tiananmen to be operated by Chinese students in the United States, and then as the base of ship board studios linked to WWCR in Tennessee for a British company registered in England by Paul Byford as World Wide Community Radio (London), Ltd., and Radlon (Sales), Ltd.

Although Baskir paid Weiner several thousand dollars for the ship and she paid additional funds to the private harbor in Boston where the vessel was berthed, Weiner could not produce a valid paper trail to show that he was the lawful owner of a ship called Sarah. Baskir and her associates then became engaged in a costly process of discovery involving authorities in the UK, USA and Panama, in an attempt to discover who legally owned the vessel. Although Panama eventually confirmed that the vessel was still legally registered by that government as Lichfield I for the ship's true original owners and Lloyd's Registry of Shipping confirmed this information, further legal questions were generated about how the ship had passed from the hands of the US government into the physical possession of Ganter who had then sold the ship to Weiner.

It was during this period of expensive investigation that Weiner entered into a sidebar arrangement with a subsidiary company of MGM, who then blew it up as part of the final scenes in their film Blown Away. Before this event had taken place, Weiner transferred the radio broadcasting equipment, including the radio tower to yet another ship which he called Fury. Weiner and another associate intended to use this new vessel to broadcast once more under the call sign of RNI. When details of the MGM transaction and the Fury transfer became known to Baskir, she promptly assisted the Federal Communications Commission attorney's to cause the arrest of the Fury, which FCC officials claimed had made a test transmission while still in US waters. The raid instigated by Baskir terminated in the arrest of the Fury and all of its transmission equipment. The case history of this matter drew to a close with Baskir having lost her funds and the FCC taking possession of all of the broadcasting equipment and destroying it. As a form of trade-off, the FCC attorney then transferred to Baskir the entire US government case file about the long history of Weiner's interaction with the FCC, which included the story of the Sarah and Sealand. Meanwhile, the legal entanglements caused by Weiner and Bates over the bogus Sealand registry created a further financial drain on Baskir's UK partner Paul Byford and to date the civil legal issues surrounding the Baskir-Byford loss have never been settled.

=== Further attempts ===
Although Weiner made further attempts to use ships to restart Radio Newyork International, these plans did not succeed. For a time he contracted with licensed US shortwave station WWCR in Tennessee to carry Radio Newyork International as a paid program. In 1990 and 1991, there were also RNI programs carried on WRNO and Radio for Peace International.

=== WBCQ ===
Eventually Allan Weiner did secure a shortwave broadcasting license of his own and today Radio Newyork International is one of many programs heard on Sunday evenings over WBCQ located in Monticello, Maine, USA.
