= Coins and postage stamps of Sealand =

Official currency of the Principality of Sealand

Sealand Dollar
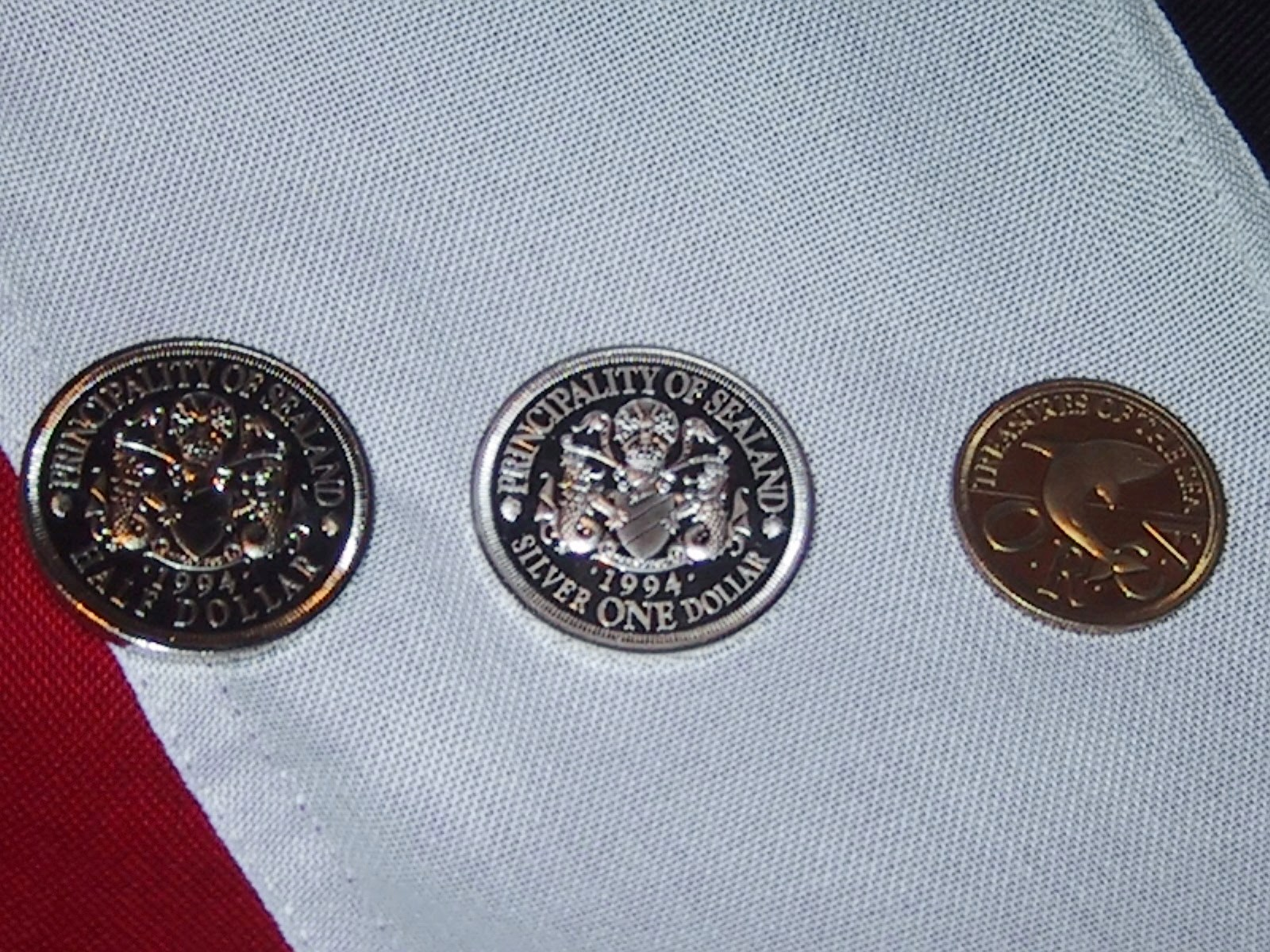
- Series of 1994

Units of account
- Symbol: SX$
- Nickname: round

Demographics
- User(s): Sealand

Issuance
- Mint: (United Kingdom) Birmingham Mint; (United Kingdom) Tower Mint
- Website: www.towermint.co.uk

The Principality of Sealand, a self-proclaimed micronation situated on a former World War II fort in the North Sea, has issued a number of coins and stamps for collectors. These coins and stamps are denominated in "Sealand dollars" (SX$). Sealand coins can be considered souvenirs only or "rounds" since they do not circulate anywhere and are not accepted as currency by any nation.

== History ==
Sealand began commissioning coins in 1972. The first to be minted was a SX$10 coin with a mintage of 2000. More coins were minted in 1975 and 1977, introducing the SX$20 and SX$100 coins. The SX$10 was minted in 925‰ fine silver, the SX$20 was minted in silver, and the SX$100 was minted in 900‰ fine gold.

In 1991 the "Sealand rebel government" (see Forcible takeover) minted antiqued silver SX$100 coins.

In 1994 the "Treasures of the Sea" Sealand dollars were minted, with an orca on the reverse. The SX$0.25, SX$0.5, SX$1, SX$2.5 and SX$5 were also introduced. The SX$0.25 was minted in bronze and 999‰ fine silver; the SX$0.5 was minted in cupronickel and silver; the SX$1 and SX$2.5 in bronze, silver and gold; and the SX$5 was minted in gold.

Sealand printed stamps in 1969 and 1970.

In 2020, a Sealand stamp was sent into space.

== Coins ==
Denomination	Obverse	Reverse	Year	Metal	Mintage	Mint
SX$0.25	Sealand Arms	Orca Whale	1994	Bronze	1111	
SX$0.25	Sealand Arms	Orca Whale	1994	.999 Silver	500	
SX$0.5	Sealand Arms	Orca Whale	1994	Cupro-nickel	1111	
SX$0.5	Sealand Arms	Orca Whale	1994	.999 Silver	500	
SX$1	Sealand Arms	Orca Whale	1994	.999 Silver	20000	
SX$1	Sealand Arms	Orca Whale	1994	.999 Gold	1111	
SX$2.5	Sealand Arms	Orca Whale	1994	Bronze	10000	
SX$2.5	Sealand Arms	Orca Whale	1994	.999 Silver	500	
SX$2.5	Sealand Arms	Orca Whale	1994	.999 Gold	1111	
SX$5	Sealand Arms	Orca Whale	1994	.999 Gold	2500	
SX$10	Princess Joan	Sailing Vessel	1972	.925 Silver	2000	
SX$100	Prince Roy, Princess Joan and the Principality of Sealand	Sealand Arms	1977	.900 Gold	2000	
SX$10	Princess Joan	Sealand Arms	1977	.925 Silver	2000	
SX$10	Prince Roy	Sealand Arms	1977	.925 Silver	2000	
SX$20	Princess Joan	Sealand Arms	1975	Silver	Unknown	
SX$25	Prince Roy, 1967–2012, motto "E Mare Libertas" and the Sealand Arms	Principality of Sealand, 25 Dollars, Sealand Arms, 1921 "In Memorium [sic]" 2012	2012	.925 Silver	300	Birmingham Mint
SX$25	JOAN PRINCESS OF SEALAND 1967 – 2016 E MARE LIBERTAS, Coat of Arms of Sealand	PRINCIPALITY OF SEALAND, 25 DOLLARS, REQUIESCAT IN PACE 1929 – 2016	2016	.925 Silver	300	Tower Mint
SX$25	RAISING THE FLAG, 2nd SEPTEMBER 1967, PRINCIPALITY OF SEALAND, 25 DOLLARS, 2017, Coat of Arms of Sealand	E MARE LIBERTAS, JOAN, PRINCESS OF SEALAND 1967-2016, ROY, PRINCE OF SEALAND 1967-2012, MICHAEL, PRINCE OF SEALAND 2012, 50TH ANNIVERSARY OF INDEPENDENCE	2017	.925 Silver	300	Tower Mint

=== Error coin ===
In 1994, fewer than 150 copies of the half dollar were accidentally cut with a scalloped edge instead of the normal reeded one. This is Sealand's only error coin to date. In addition, a mule of a Navy SEALs commemorative medallion was inadvertently struck, by the same private mint that produces Sealand's coins, using the reverse of a Sealandic half dollar. 75 of these were struck before the error was noticed.

=== Rebel government coin ===
A rebel government, referring to itself as the "Sealand government in exile", seeking to occupy Sealand, issued a single commemorative coin in 1992.

Denomination	Obverse	Reverse	Year	Metal	Mintage
SX$100	Sealand Arms	PRIME MINISTER OF SEALAND JOHANNES SEIGER ("Sealand Rebel Government")	1991	Silver	1000

== Stamps ==
A Sealandic 80 cent stamp issued in 1977

=== 1969: Explorers ===
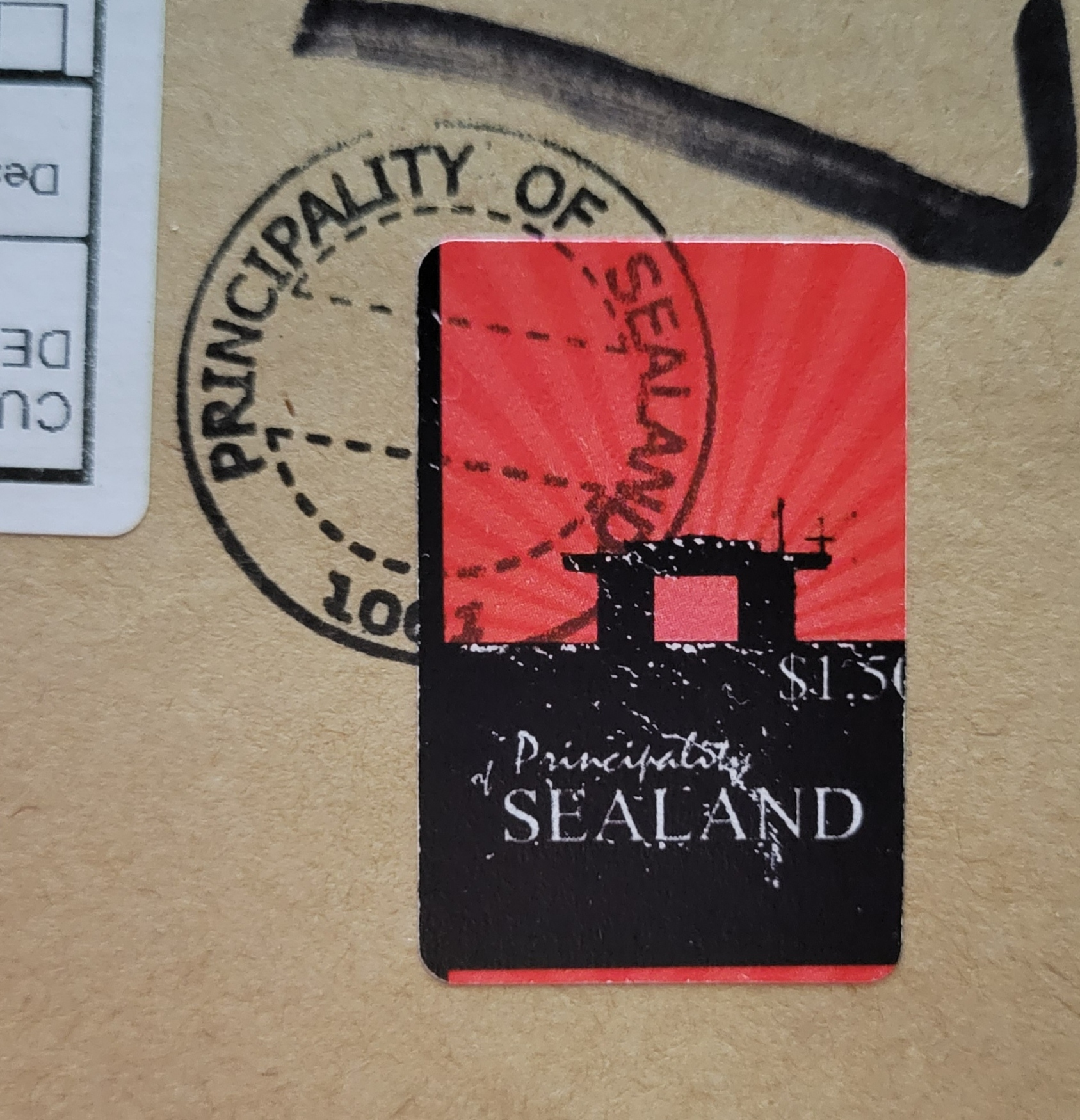
Cancelled SX$1.50 2010 stamp

- Vasco da Gama 1497 – 2c (later 10c)
- Christopher Columbus 1492 – 3c (later 10c)
- Sir Walter Raleigh 1584 – 5c (later 5c)
- Sir Francis Drake 1588 – 6c (later 10c)
- Captain James Cook 1770 – 14c (later 10c)
- Ferdinand Magellan 1519 – 20c (later 20c)
- Sir Martin Frobisher 1578 – 50c (later 10c)

=== 1970 ===
- Ship – SX$1
- Ships – SX$1
- Edward Teach – SX$1
- Squid – SX$1

=== 1970: Ships ===
- Ships

=== 1970: Fish ===
- Fish

=== 1975: International Woman's Year ===
- Africa – 10c
- Australia – 20c
- Europe – 30c
- Asia – 50c
- America – 90c
- Joan I – SX$1

=== 1977: Sailing ships ===
- Ship of Ferdinand Magellan 1519 – 10c
- Ship of Vasco da Gama 1497 – 20c
- Ship of Christopher Columbus 1492 – 30c
- Ship of Captain James Cook 1770 – 40c
- Ship of Sir Walter Raleigh 1584 – 50c
- Ship of Sir Martin Frobisher 1578 – 60c
- Ship of Sir Francis Drake 1588 – 70c
- Sealandic Coat of Arms – 80c
- Roy of Sealand – 90c
- Joan of Sealand – SX$1

=== 2010 ===
- Green stamp SX$3.50
- Red stamp SX$1.50
- Blue stamp "Inland"

=== 2023 ===
- The Fort SX$3.50
- The Independence Day Flag SX$3.50
- The RIB SX$1.50
- Sealand Flag Prints SX$1.50
- Inland Seal "Inland"
- Inland Crab "Inland"
- Inland Seashell "Inland"

== See also ==
- Cinderella stamp
- List of micronation currencies
