= New Ferry Butterfly Park =

UK urban nature reserve

Coordinates: 53.3608°N 3.0040°W

New Ferry Butterfly Park is a 2-hectare (4.9-acre) urban nature reserve in New Ferry, on the Wirral Peninsula, England. It is managed by the Cheshire Wildlife Trust.

The reserve is located on a site formerly occupied by abandoned sidings north of Bebington railway station. On the thin, nutrient-poor soils overlying the old railway track beds, the lime waste from a water-softening plant has been used to create a calcareous grassland, with all the specialist wildflowers which depend on that habitat, including wild carrot and occasional bee orchids. Drifts of coal dust have been transformed into acidic grassland dominated by common bent, sheep's sorrel and bird's-foot trefoil. The reserve supports at least 397 species, including butterflies, moths, bees and spiders. Twenty-six species of butterfly have been recorded, with 16 species breeding at the reserve.

In recent years, the reserve has hosted an open-air sculpture trail.

== Recent history ==
The Cheshire Wildlife Trust (CWT) was granted tenancy over the land in 1993 by the site's owner at the time, the British Railways Board. In 1997, Frithmere Ltd. (a subsidiary of Brock PLC of Ellesmere Port) bought the land in an open auction. In 2009 New Ferry Butterfly Park was threatened with closure when CWT was told to vacate the site by Frithmere. As an alternative site for the reserve, Frithmere's agent had suggested Bromborough Dock landfill, which belonged to Biffa. (This site was later opened as to the public as Port Sunlight River Park, leased by The Land Trust and managed by Wirral Autistic Society (with CWT members as ecological advisors) from 2014).

In January 2010, a secret report to the Wirral Council, backed by petitions signed by thousands of people, recommended that officials issue a compulsory purchase order to buy the reserve and prevent its closure.

On 29 June 2011, however, the Liverpool County Court rejected Frithmere's notice to quit, as it was issued under the incorrect legislation. Although the judge left it open to Frithmere to serve a notice to quit under the Landlord and Tenant Act of 1954, he warned the firm that it would be difficult to succeed and refused to allow an appeal, since, according to the judge, "The only grounds on which I can conceive it succeeding are on redevelopment of the site, and there may be difficulty in securing planning permission in view of the nature of this land."

The short-term lease currently makes it difficult to apply for grants or to build an all-season visitor centre. However, the site has a composting toilet and indoor space in a cargo container. The Park is open Sunday afternoons 12-4pm, May–September, and 2nd Sunday of the month, 10am-4pm, October–April. Guided visits other times by appointment - see www.cheshirewildlifetrust.org.uk
