= Joan Collins (disambiguation) =

Joan Collins is an English actress.

Joan Collins may also refer to:

- Joan Collins (politician), Irish politician
- Joan Bates, born Joan Collins, self-proclaimed Princess of Sealand
- Joan Collins (née Williams), participant in the British TV series The Only Way Is Essex
- "The Joan Collins Fan Club", alias used by British comedian Julian Clary
