= Principality of Sealand =

Unrecognized micronation in the North Sea

- Micronation (unrecognised entity)
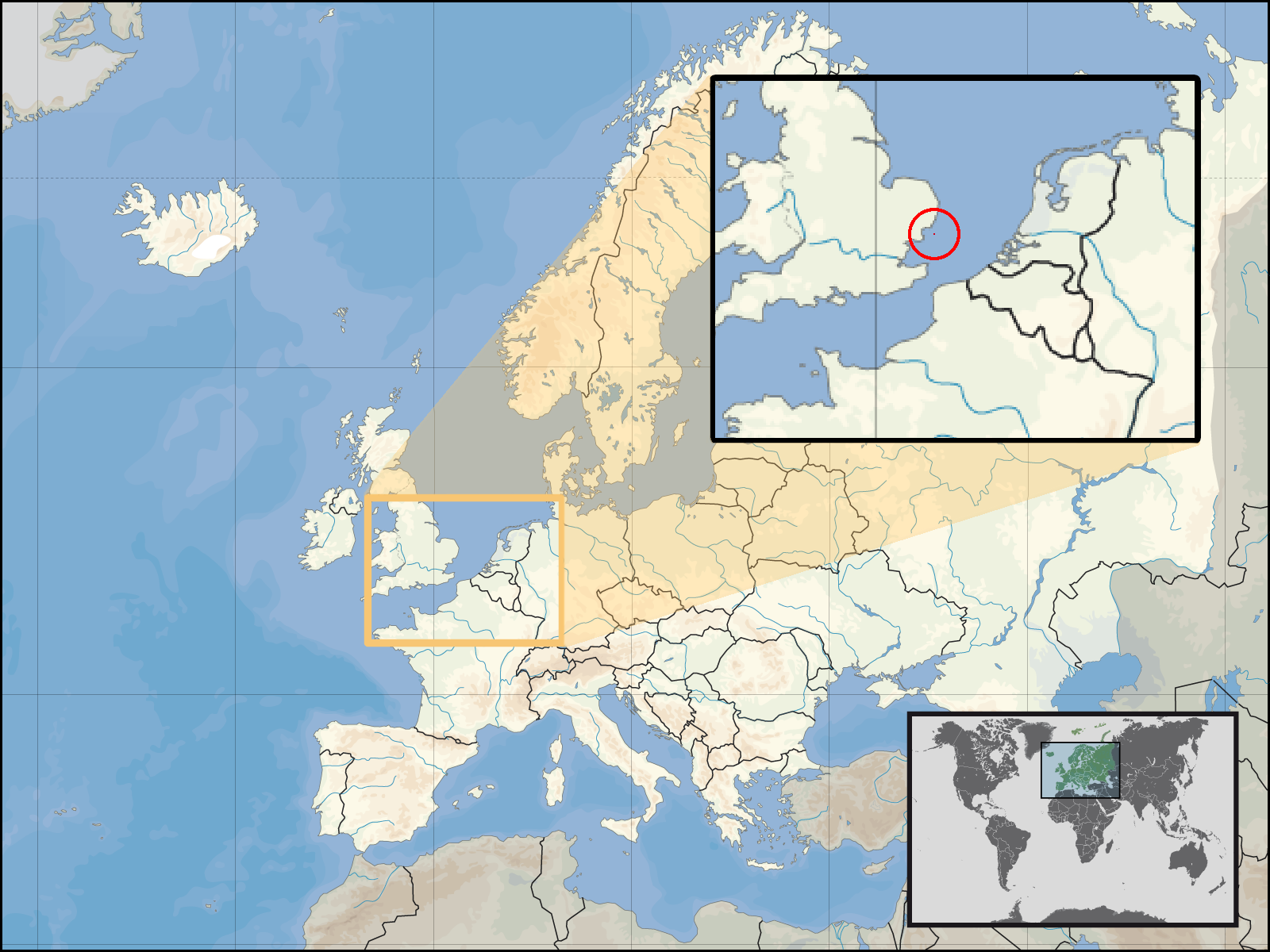

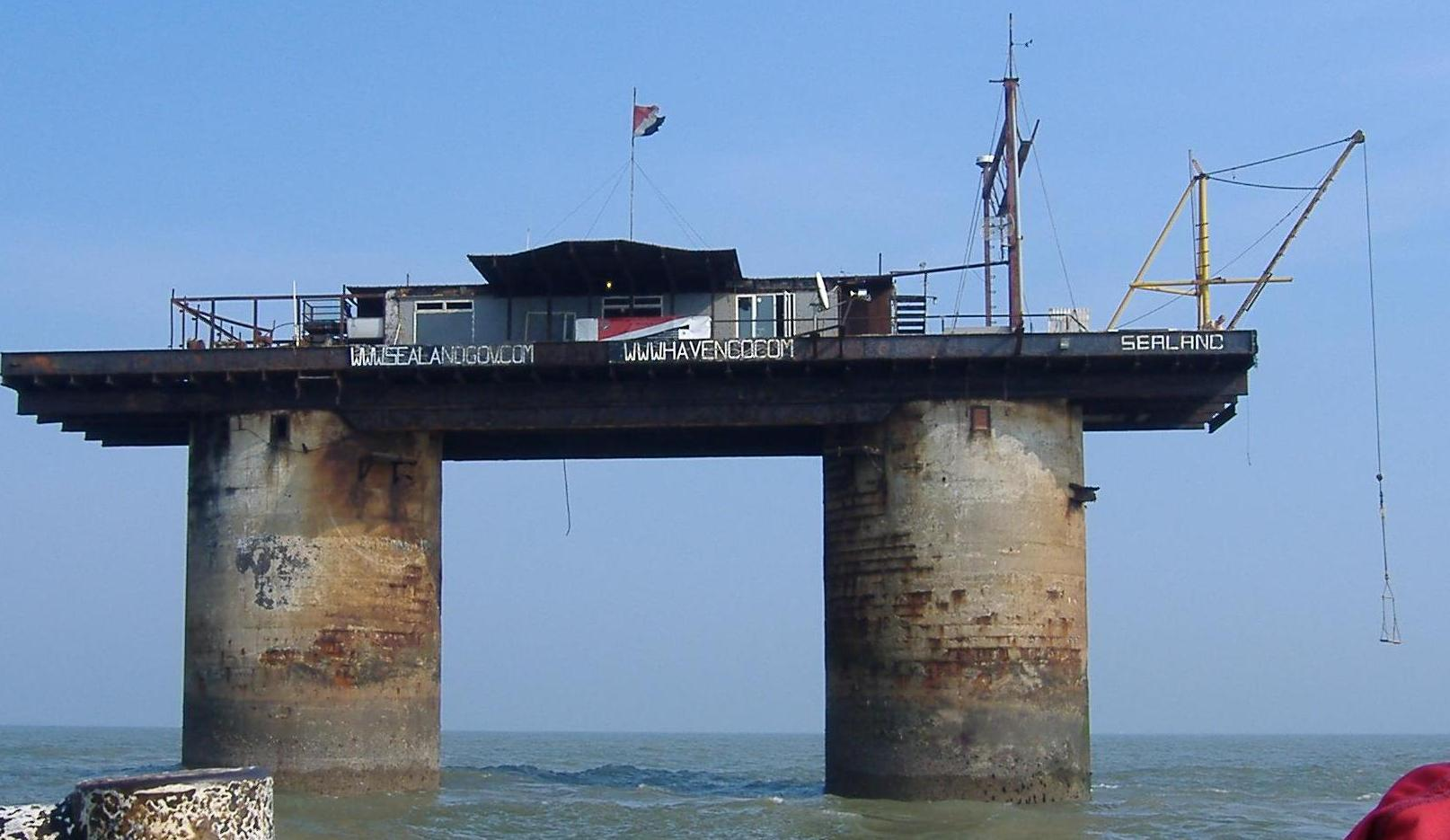
- Sealand in 2006
- Location: HM Fort Roughs, an offshore platform off the coast of England; 51°53′42.6″N 1°28′49.8″E
- Area claimed: 0.0004 km^{2} (0.00015 sq mi)
- Number of residents: 1
- Claimed by: Paddy Roy Bates, Michael Bates
- Dates claimed: September 2, 1967–present

The Principality of Sealand (/ˈsiːˌlænd/) is an unrecognised micronation on HM Fort Roughs (also known as Roughs Tower), an offshore platform in the North Sea. It is situated on Rough Sands, a sandbar located approximately 11 kilometres (6 nmi) from the coast of Suffolk and 13 kilometres (7 nmi) from the coast of Essex. Roughs Tower is a Maunsell Sea Fort that was built by the British in international waters during World War II. Since 1967, the decommissioned Roughs Tower has been occupied and claimed as a sovereign state by the family and associates of Paddy Roy Bates. Bates seized Roughs Tower from a group of pirate radio broadcasters in 1967 with the intention of setting up his own station there. Bates and his associates have repelled incursions from vessels from rival pirate radio stations and the UK's Royal Navy using firearms and petrol bombs. In 1987, the United Kingdom extended its territorial waters from its previous 3 nautical miles to 12, which places the platform in British territory. As of August 2024, Sealand has only one permanent resident.

== History ==
In 1943, during World War II, Roughs Tower was constructed by the United Kingdom as one of the Maunsell Forts, primarily to defend the vital shipping lanes in nearby estuaries against German mine-laying aircraft. It consisted of a floating pontoon base with a superstructure of two hollow towers joined by a deck upon which other structures could be added. The fort was towed to a position above the Rough Sands sandbar, where its base was deliberately flooded to sink it in place. This is approximately 7 nautical miles (13 km) from the coast of Suffolk, outside the then 3 nmi (6 km) claim of the United Kingdom and, therefore, in international waters at the time. The facility was occupied by 150–300 Royal Navy personnel throughout World War II; the last full-time personnel left in 1956. The Maunsell Forts were decommissioned in the 1950s.

=== Occupation and establishment ===
On 2 September 1967, the fort was occupied by Paddy Roy Bates, a British citizen and the owner of a pirate radio station, who ejected the competing group of pirate broadcasters. Bates intended to broadcast his pirate radio station—called Radio Essex—from the platform. Despite having the necessary equipment, he never began broadcasting. Bates declared the independence of Roughs Tower and deemed it the Principality of Sealand.

In 1968, British workmen entered what Bates claimed to be his territorial waters to service a navigational buoy near the platform. Michael Bates (son of Paddy Roy Bates) tried to scare the workmen off by firing warning shots from the fort. As Bates was a British subject at the time, he was summoned to court in England on firearms charges following the incident. The court ruled that the platform (which Bates was now calling Sealand) was outside British territorial limits, being beyond the three-nautical-mile (6 km) limit which then applied to the country's waters. As a result, the case could not proceed, as it was not within British jurisdiction. Bates considers this Sealand's first instance of de facto recognition.

The flag that flies above HM Fort Roughs, designed by Paddy Roy Bates in 1975

In 1975, Bates introduced a constitution for Sealand, followed by a national flag, a national anthem entitled E Mare Libertas, a currency, passports, and an immigration stamp.

=== 1978 attempted coup by German mercenaries ===
In August 1978, Alexander Achenbach, who described himself as the Prime Minister of Sealand, hired several German and Dutch mercenaries to lead an attack on Sealand while Bates and his wife were in Austria, invited by Achenbach to discuss the sale of Sealand. Achenbach had disagreed with Bates over plans to turn Sealand into a luxury hotel and casino with fellow German and Dutch businessmen. They stormed the platform and took Bates's son, Michael Bates, hostage. Michael was able to retake Sealand and capture Achenbach and the mercenaries. Achenbach, a German lawyer who held a Sealand passport, was charged with treason against Sealand, and was held unless he paid DM 75,000 (more than US$35,000 or £23,000). Germany then sent a diplomat from its London embassy to Sealand to negotiate for Achenbach's release. Roy Bates relented after several weeks of negotiations and subsequently claimed that the diplomat's visit constituted de facto recognition of Sealand by Germany.

Following his repatriation, Achenbach and Gernot Pütz proclaimed a government in exile, sometimes known as the Sealand Rebel Government or Sealandic Rebel Government, in Germany.

=== Expansion of British territorial waters ===
In 1987, the United Kingdom extended its territorial waters to 12 nautical miles, which put Sealand in waters internationally recognised as British.

Sealand previously sold fantasy passports (as termed by the Council of the European Union), which are not valid for international travel. In 1997, the Bates family revoked all Sealand passports, including those that they themselves had issued over the previous 22 years, due to the realisation that an international money laundering ring had appeared, using the sale of fake Sealand passports to finance drug trafficking and money laundering from Russia and Iraq. The ringleaders of the operation, based in Madrid but with ties to various groups in Germany—including to the rebel Sealand Government in exile established by Achenbach—had used fake Sealandic diplomatic passports and number plates. They were reported to have sold 4,000 fake Sealandic passports to Hong Kong citizens for an estimated $1,000 each.

In 2015, Bates asserted that Sealand's population is "normally like two people".

=== 2006 fire ===
On the afternoon of 23 June 2006, the top platform of the Roughs Tower caught fire due to an electrical fault. A Royal Air Force rescue helicopter transferred one person to Ipswich Hospital, directly from the tower. The Harwich lifeboat stood by the Roughs Tower until a local fire tug extinguished the fire. All damage was repaired by November 2006.

=== Attempted sales ===
In January 2007, The Pirate Bay, an online index of digital content of entertainment media and software founded by the Swedish think tank Piratbyrån, attempted to purchase Sealand after harsher copyright measures in Sweden forced them to look for a base of operations elsewhere. Between 2007 and 2010, Sealand was offered for sale through the Spanish estate company InmoNaranja, at an asking price of €750 million (£600 million, US$906 million), (approximately £985 million in 2024).

=== Death of founder ===
Roy Bates died at the age of 91 on 9 October 2012 after a diagnosis of Alzheimer's disease several years earlier. His son Michael took over the operation of Sealand, although he continued to live in Suffolk, where he and his sons were operating a family fishing business called Fruits of the Sea. Joan Bates, Roy Bates's wife, died in an Essex nursing home at the age of 86 on 10 March 2016.

== Legal status ==
Map of Sealand and the United Kingdom, with territorial water claims of 3 and 12 nmi (6 and 22 km) shown.

In 1987, the UK extended its territorial waters from 3 to 12 nautical miles (6 to 22 km), bringing Sealand into British territorial waters. In the opinion of law academic John Gibson, there is little chance that Sealand would be recognised as a nation due to it being a man-made structure.

=== Recognition ===
Sealand is not officially recognised by any established sovereign state. Nonetheless, the Sealand government claims it has been de facto recognised by the United Kingdom and Germany, on account of a UK court ruling and Germany's dispatch of a diplomat to Sealand.

== Administration ==
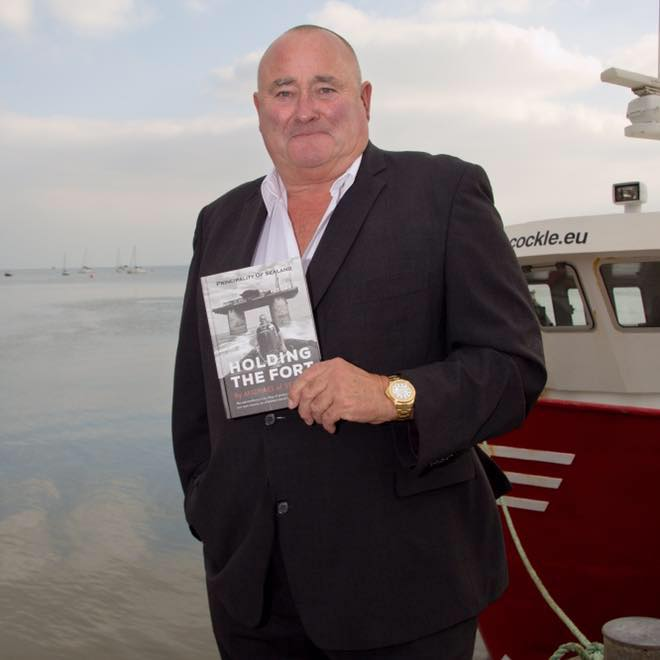
Michael Bates

Irrespective of its legal status, Sealand is managed by the Bates family as if it were a recognised sovereign entity and they are its hereditary royal rulers. Roy Bates styled himself as Prince Roy and his wife Princess Joan. Their son had been referred to as the Prince Regent by the Bates family between 1999 and Roy's death in 2012. In this role, he apparently served as Sealand's acting Head of State and also its Head of Government.

At a micronations conference hosted by the University of Sunderland in 2004, Sealand was represented by Michael Bates's son James. The facility is now occupied by one or more caretakers representing Michael Bates, who himself resides in Essex, England.

=== List of operators ===
Image	Name	Start of office	End of office
	Roy Bates (1921—2012)	September 2, 1967	October 9, 2012
	Michael Bates (born 1952—1953)	October 9, 2012	Incumbent

== Business operations ==
Sealand has been involved in several commercial operations, including the issuing of coins and postage stamps and the establishment of an offshore Internet hosting facility, or data haven. The principality also sells noble titles on its online store, such as Lord and Baron.

=== HavenCo ===
In 2000, publicity was created about Sealand following the establishment of a new entity called HavenCo, a data haven, which effectively took control of Roughs Tower itself. Ryan Lackey, Haven's co-founder and a key participant in the country, left HavenCo under acrimonious circumstances in 2002, citing disagreements with the Bates family over management of the company. The HavenCo website went offline in 2008.

== Sports ==
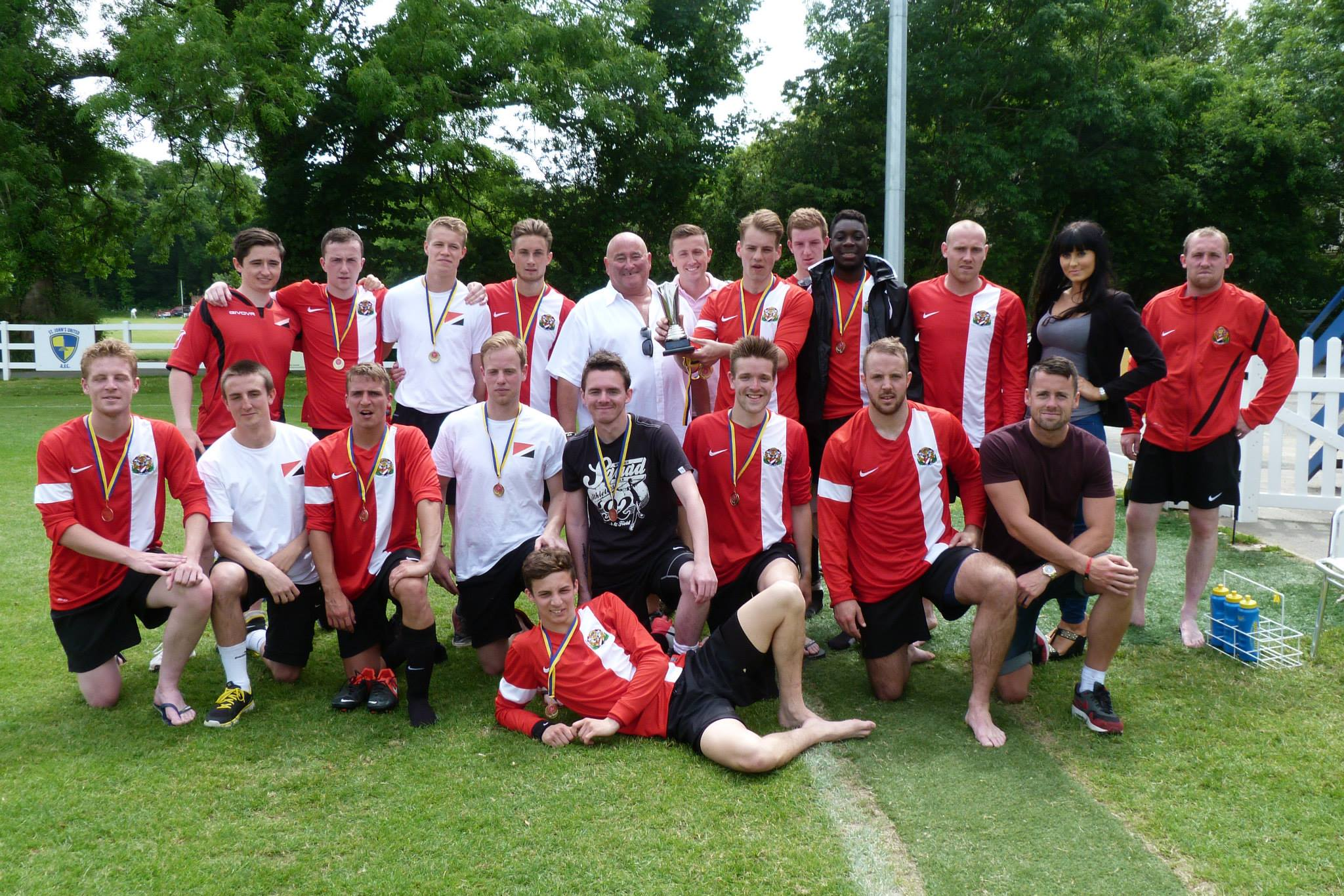
The Sealand national football team with the Bates family

Sealand is nominal home to multiple sports teams, including an association football team and an American football club.

Sealand's national association football team was founded in 2003, initially being a team from Vestbjerg representing the micronation. In 2009, the team was revised with Neil Forsyth as manager. Following Forsyth, the team has been managed by Julian Dicks and Ed Stubbs.

The micronation's American football club was founded in the summer of 2021 by husband-and-wife Mike and Nia Ireland and Mikey Gray. As of 2022, the club had men's, women's, and masters (players over 35) teams, and had over 200 players and staff.

The national flag of Sealand has been carried by mountaineers to the peaks of Muztagh Ata and Mount Everest. Additionally, athletes have represented Sealand in international kung fu and ultimate frisbee competitions.

Sealand itself has also been the site of skateboarding and a single-person half marathon. Richard Royal swam from Sealand to the British mainland in 2018, being recognised by the British Long Distance Swimming Association and the World Open Water Swimming Association in doing so.

== See also ==
- Radio Newyork International
- Self-proclaimed monarchy
- The Battle of Sealand
