= Michael Bates (Sealand) =

Self-styled Prince of Sealand (born 1950s)

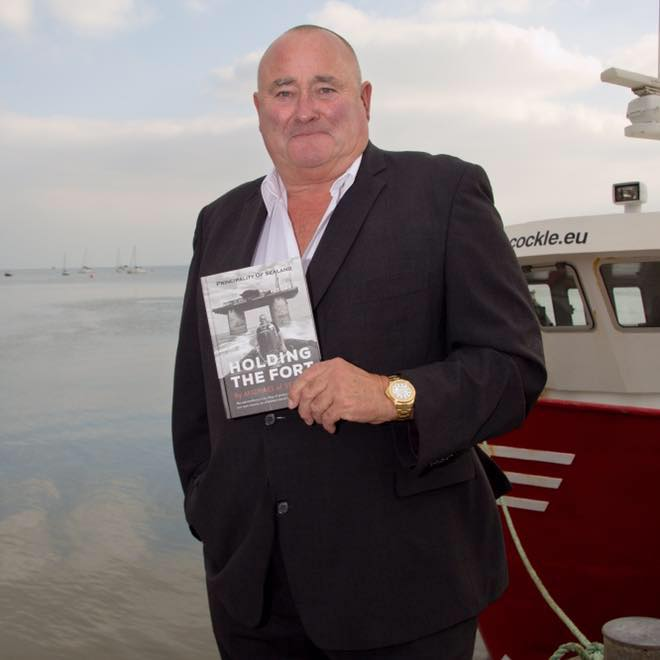
- Bates in 2015

Prince of Sealand (Micronation)
- Pretendance: 9 October 2012 – present
- Predecessor: Paddy Roy Bates
- Heir apparent: James Bates
- Born: Michael Roy Bates; 1952 or 1953
- Spouse: Lorraine Wheeler (divorced) Mei Shi (m. 2019)
- Issue: James; Liam; Charlotte
- Father: Paddy Roy Bates
- Mother: Joan Collins

Michael Roy Bates (born 1952 or 1953), self-styled as Prince Michael of Sealand, is an English businessman and self-published author. He operates a self-proclaimed and unrecognized micronation called the Principality of Sealand, which he inherited from his parents Paddy Roy Bates and Joan Bates. He has claimed the title "Prince of Sealand" since the death of his father in 2012.

== Early life ==
Michael Bates was born to Roy and Joan Bates in 1952 or 1953. On 24 December 1966, at the age of 14, Michael joined his father Roy in occupying HM Fort Roughs, where they established a pirate radio station. Michael left his boarding school to visit the platform and ended up never going back, stating, "I thought it was a six-week adventure, not 34 years." On 2 September 1967, Roy declared sovereignty over the platform, and moved his family permanently to Sealand, including wife Joan, son Michael, and daughter Penelope. Michael was a key participant in the battle to retake Sealand from the perpetrators of an attempted coup.

== Sealand ==
On whether Sealand is a sovereign state, Bates stated, "We have never asked for recognition, and we’ve never felt the need to ask for recognition. You don't have to have recognition to be a state, you just have to fulfill the criteria of the Montevideo Convention which is population, territory, government, and the capacity to enter into negotiation with other states. We can and we have done all these things. We've had the German ambassador visit at one point to discuss something: that was de facto recognition. We've had communication with the president of France many years ago, but we have never asked for recognition and we don’t feel we need it."

In 2015, Bates published a memoir about his experiences with Sealand called Principality of Sealand: Holding the Fort. Bates presented a discussion of his book at Estuary 2016, an art, literature, music and film festival.

In September 2017, Bates held a dinner to commemorate the 50th anniversary of Sealand, stating, "We're perhaps the most undemanding state in the world. We don't force anybody to worship any god or religion or anything. Maybe that's why we've lasted so long. Hopefully I'll be around for the next 50!"

== Personal life and other ventures ==
Bates divides his time between Sealand and Westcliff-on-Sea, Essex. He wanted his three children to attend English schools.

Bates runs a shellfish company that harvests cockles mainly for the Spanish market. The business, called Fruits of the Sea, is run by Bates and his sons James and Liam. He also has a daughter named Charlotte. All three children are with his former wife, Lorraine Wheeler. Bates's second wife is Mei Shi, a former officer in the Chinese People's Liberation Army.

== See also ==
- List of micronations
- Maunsell Sea Fort

Titles in pretence
Preceded by Paddy Roy Bates	Prince of Sealand; 2012–present	Incumbent
