= Port Sunlight River Park =

Park in Port Sunlight, United Kingdom

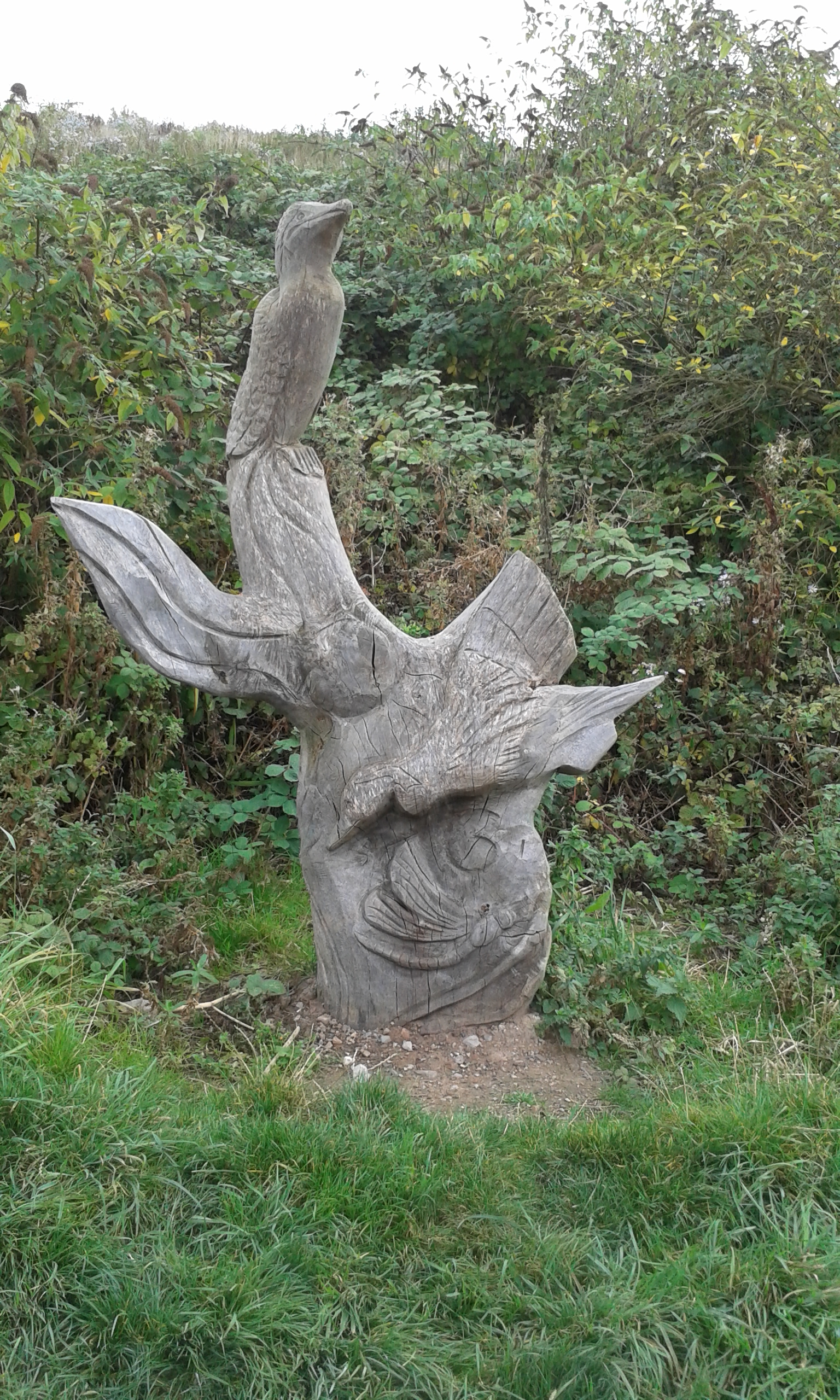
- "Bird sculpture at the park"
- Interactive map of Port Sunlight River Park
- Type: Public park
- Location: Port Sunlight, Merseyside, England.
- Coordinates: 53.358°N 2.983°W
- Area: 30 hectares (74 acres)
- Created: 2014
- Operator: The Land Trust and Autism Together (Managing Agents)
- Status: Open all year

Port Sunlight River Park is a river park on the shore of the river Mersey at Port Sunlight, Merseyside, England.

== History ==
The park was formerly a landfill site at Bromborough Dock that was turned into a nature park during a £2.3 million conversion. Now known as Port Sunlight River Park, it opened in summer 2014. The park provides visitors with a number of distinct experiences including a freshwater lake which is rich in wildlife, new habitats, a scenic waterfront, a perimeter walk, a link to Shorefields Nature Park, and paths to the summit with views of the River Mersey estuary and Liverpool skyline.

== Facilities ==
The park has footpaths for use by walkers, joggers and ramblers. The park is 37m above the river level allowing unrivalled views of Liverpool.

== Conservation ==
The park is intended to provide a natural habitat for wildlife, plants and birds.

== Power station ==
Gas from the landfill is extracted via a series of pipes and taken to a nearby power plant and converted to electricity.
