= Bromborough Dock =

Dock in Bromborough, Wirral, England

Coordinates: 53.36242°N 2.97070°W

Bromborough Dock Act 1923
- Act of Parliament
- Parliament of the United Kingdom
- Long title: An Act to authorise Lever Brothers Limited to construct a dock and other works in the urban district of Bebington and Bromborough in the county of Chester and for other purposes.
- Citation: 13 & 14 Geo. 5. c. lxxii

Dates
- Royal assent: 31 July 1923

Text of statute as originally enacted

Bromborough Dock was situated on the River Mersey at Bromborough, on the Wirral Peninsula, England. Owned by the manufacturer Lever Brothers (and its successor Unilever), it served the company's factory at Port Sunlight. The facility was once the largest private dock in the world.

Bromborough Dock Act 1946
- Act of Parliament
- Parliament of the United Kingdom
- Long title: An Act to remove doubts as to the interpretation of certain enactments relating to the dock railway and other works authorised by the Bromborough Dock Act 1923.
- Citation: 9 & 10 Geo. 6. c. lv

Dates
- Royal assent: 1 August 1946

Other legislation
- Repealed by: Bromborough Dock Act 1986

Status: Repealed

Text of statute as originally enacted

Consent for its construction was given by the Bromborough Dock Act 1923 (13 & 14 Geo. 5. c. lxxii). Officially opened on 17 April 1931, it replaced a smaller dock and wharf built at Bromborough Pool in 1895. Located at the mouth of the Pool, the new dock allowed for larger ocean-going vessels to berth. The dock was provided with a link to the Birkenhead Railway as part of the Lever Brothers private railway network, which remained fully operational until 1969.

The dock handled a wide variety of cargoes during its lifetime, including: paper, timber, animal and plant oils and fats (resin, tallow, palm oil and copra). Lever Brothers used its own fleet of barges and coasters to transport goods to and from other docks on the River Mersey and to the company's other factory site at Warrington via the Manchester Ship Canal. Other tenants on the Lever industrial estate also made use of the dock's facilities.

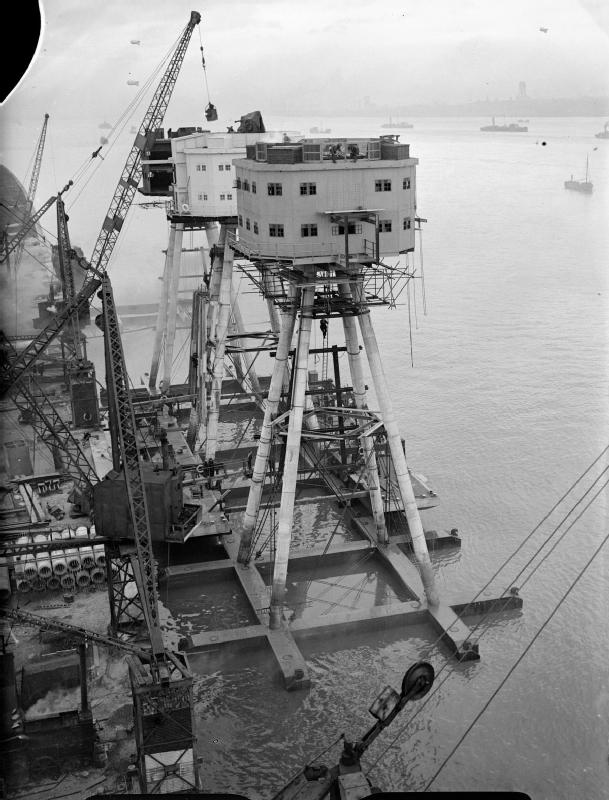
Maunsell forts under construction

During the Second World War, Bromborough Dock was utilised as an alternative shipping berth to Liverpool and Birkenhead Docks, which were very congested and often damaged by enemy action. It was also used for the construction of Maunsell army forts, offshore anti-aircraft towers which were placed in Liverpool Bay.

Bromborough Dock Act 1986
- Act of Parliament
- Parliament of the United Kingdom
- Long title: An Act to provide for the abandonment of Bromborough Dock; to empower UML Limited to construct certain works for the purposes of such abandonment and to confer further powers upon the Company; and for other purposes.
- Citation: 1986 c. xviii

Dates
- Royal assent: 25 July 1986

Text of statute as originally enacted

By the 1980s, a gradual decline in goods traffic precipitated the decision to close the dock. This occurred following the passing of the Bromborough Dock Act 1986 (c. xviii) in September 1986. Most of the site was used for landfill between 1991 and 2006. Since the cessation of waste disposal operations, the area has been landscaped into a public park called Port Sunlight River Park which opened in August 2014.
