= Friedrich Maik =

German real estate agent

Maik Geikler
- Born: March 28, 1969 (age 57)
- Occupation: Real estate agent
- Movement: Großherzogtum Friedrich Maik
- Website: www.ghz-friedrich-maik.com

Maik Geikler (born 28 March 1969) more commonly known as Friedrich Maik, is a German real estate agent and political activist who claims to be the Grand Duke of Mecklenburg, among other titles. He and his followers have been associated with the Reichsbürger movement, although Maik himself denied such associations, and are being observed by the Office for the Protection of the Constitution of Mecklenburg-Vorpommern, which accuses him of striving to abolish democracy to install himself as a monarch. His organization, named Großherzogtum Friedrich Maik (GHZ), is estimated to have about 55 members as of 2024, while his Telegram-channel had about 20,000 members before being taken down.

== Biography ==
Maik's movement uses a flag that resembles the former civil ensign of Mecklenburg-Schwerin.

According to his website, Maik was born on born 28 March 1969, although his website also speaks of a "Geikler Maik", a name that closely resembles his real name, being born on 1 November 1968.

Maik is not believed to actually be descended from the Grand Ducal line of Mecklenburg, with the State Archive in Schwerin stating that the dynasty's line is well known. He claims the titles "Head of State of the Grand Duchy of Mecklenburg-Strelitz, Mecklenburg-Schwerin and the Duchy of Pomerania" as well as the "King of Prussia".

He has faced criminal investigations due to, among other things, alleged Volksverhetzung, violation of the Federal Data Protection Act, and fraud.

Maik claimed to have "activated" the Grand Duchy of Mecklenburg-Strelitz "in its geographical borders on 1918" during July 2019 and has since started that if 10% of the population in his claimed areas were to show support to him via a "ballot", the government of Mecklenburg-Vorpommern would be required to hand power over to him. Despite claiming to have received over 150,000 ballots, Maik reasoned his goal not being achieved with ballots that have gone missing.

== Views ==
Maik believes in peacefully establishing a "parliamentary monarchy" with himself at its head. He has stated that this system would not impose any value-added tax or interest charges and would operate under a state-owned bank that would use a golden Schilling as currency.
