= Joan Bates =

Paddy Roy Bates's wife (1929–2016)

- Bates in the 1970s
- Born: Joan Collins; 2 September 1929; Aldershot, Hampshire, England
- Died: 10 March 2016 (aged 86); Leigh-on-Sea, Essex, England
- Occupation: Entrepreneur
- Title: Princess consort of Sealand
- Spouse: Paddy Roy Bates (m. 1949; died 2012)
- Children: Michael Bates; Penelope "Penny" Bates
- Parents: Albert Collins (father); Elizabeth Collins (mother)

Joan Bates (née Collins; 2 September 1929 – 10 March 2016), also self-styled as Princess Joan of Sealand, was the wife of Paddy Roy Bates, a British entrepreneur who founded the self-proclaimed micronation known as the Principality of Sealand.

== Early life ==
Bates was born Joan Collins on 2 September 1929 at Aldershot Barracks in England, the daughter of RSM Albert Collins of the Royal Horse Artillery, and his wife, Elizabeth. The family were later stationed at Shoebury Barracks.

As a young woman, Joan was a carnival queen and model who, according to her son Michael, "modelled for all sorts of companies".

== Marriage ==
Joan met British Army major Paddy Roy Bates at the Kursaal dance hall in Southend-on-Sea. At the time he was recuperating from serious burns suffered during World War II. They married three months later in 1949 at the Caxton Hall Registry Office in London. They had two children, Penelope "Penny" and Michael.

== Sealand ==
In the 1960s, Roy and Joan launched a pirate radio station and on Joan's birthday on 2 September 1967, they declared the Principality of Sealand independent, appointing themselves Prince Roy and Princess Joan, thus making Joan the "self-proclaimed ruler of the world's smallest kingdom".

== Death ==
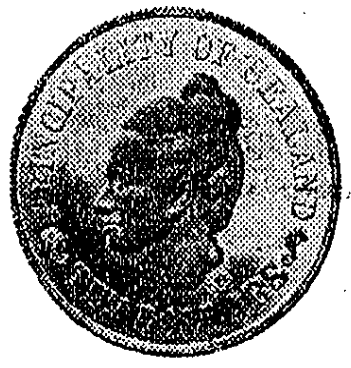
Sealand 10 dollar coin (1972) depicting Bates

Bates died on 10 March 2016 at a Leigh-on-Sea, Essex, nursing home, following a long illness. Her funeral was held on 17 March, with her coffin draped with the flag of Sealand. She was survived by her two children, four grandchildren, six great-grandchildren, and two great-great-grandchildren.

Bates featured on at least one postage stamp issued by the Principality, as well as coins inscribed "Princess Joan".
