= Roy Bates =

Principality of Sealand founder (1921–2012)

- Bates in 1977

Prince of Sealand (Micronation)
- Pretence: 2 September 1967 – 9 October 2012
- Predecessor: Position established
- Successor: Michael Bates
- Born: Patrick Roy Bates; 29 August 1921; Ealing, Middlesex, England
- Died: 9 October 2012 (aged 91); Leigh-on-Sea, Essex, England
- Spouse: Joan Collins (m. 1949)
- Issue: Michael Bates; Penelope "Penny" Bates
- Occupation: Pirate radio entrepreneur
- Military career
- Allegiance: United Kingdom
- Branch: British Army
- Service years: c. 1940
- Rank: Major
- Conflicts: World War II

Patrick Roy Bates (29 August 1921 – 9 October 2012), self-styled as Prince Roy of Sealand, was a British pirate radio broadcaster and micronationalist, who founded the self-proclaimed Principality of Sealand.

== Early life ==
Bates was born in Ealing, Middlesex, in 1921. He served in the British Army during World War II, rising to the rank of major, and was injured several times. He served in the Battle of Monte Cassino in the Italian campaign, and had been with the Eighth Army in North Africa. He then became a fisherman.

== Radio Essex ==
He then moved into broadcasting via pirate radio. In 1965, he ousted the pirate station Radio City staff who had occupied Knock John Fort, a Maunsell Sea Fort (a World War II British naval defence platform).

Using the military equipment that was left on the platform, Bates used an old United States Air Force radio beacon to broadcast his station. From Knock John Fort, he ran Radio Essex from 1965 to 1966 and succeeded in becoming the first pirate radio station to provide 24-hour entertainment.

The station changed its name in October 1966 to Britain's Better Music Station (BBMS) after Bates had been convicted of violating Section One of the Wireless Telegraphy Act 1949. Bates was then fined £100 for his continued illegal broadcasting. Due to insufficient funds, BBMS went off the air on Christmas Day in 1966.

== Formation of Sealand ==
Royal standard of Sealand

Bates moved his operation to the nearby Roughs Tower, another Maunsell Fort further out beyond the then boundary of the United Kingdom's territorial waters, but, despite having the necessary equipment, he never began broadcasting again.

On 14 August 1967, the Marine, &c., Broadcasting (Offences) Act 1967 came into effect which forbade broadcasting from certain marine structures, namely platforms such as Bates's. 19 days later, on 2 September 1967, Bates declared the independence of Roughs Tower and deemed it the Principality of Sealand.

Ronan O'Rahilly of another pirate radio station, Radio Caroline, along with a small group of men, tried to storm the platform that Bates claimed. Bates and his associates used petrol bombs and guns to thwart O'Rahilly's attempt. As a result of the conflict, the Royal Navy went to Roughs Tower and were the recipients of warning shots fired by Bates's son, Michael, when they entered what Bates claimed to be Sealand's territorial waters.

Bates and his son were arrested and charged in a British court with weapons charges. The court threw out the case, claiming that the British court did not have jurisdiction over international affairs as Roughs Tower lay beyond the territorial waters of Britain.

Bates took this as de facto recognition of Sealand and seven years later issued a constitution, flag, and national anthem, among other things, for the Principality of Sealand.

== Incident of 1978 ==
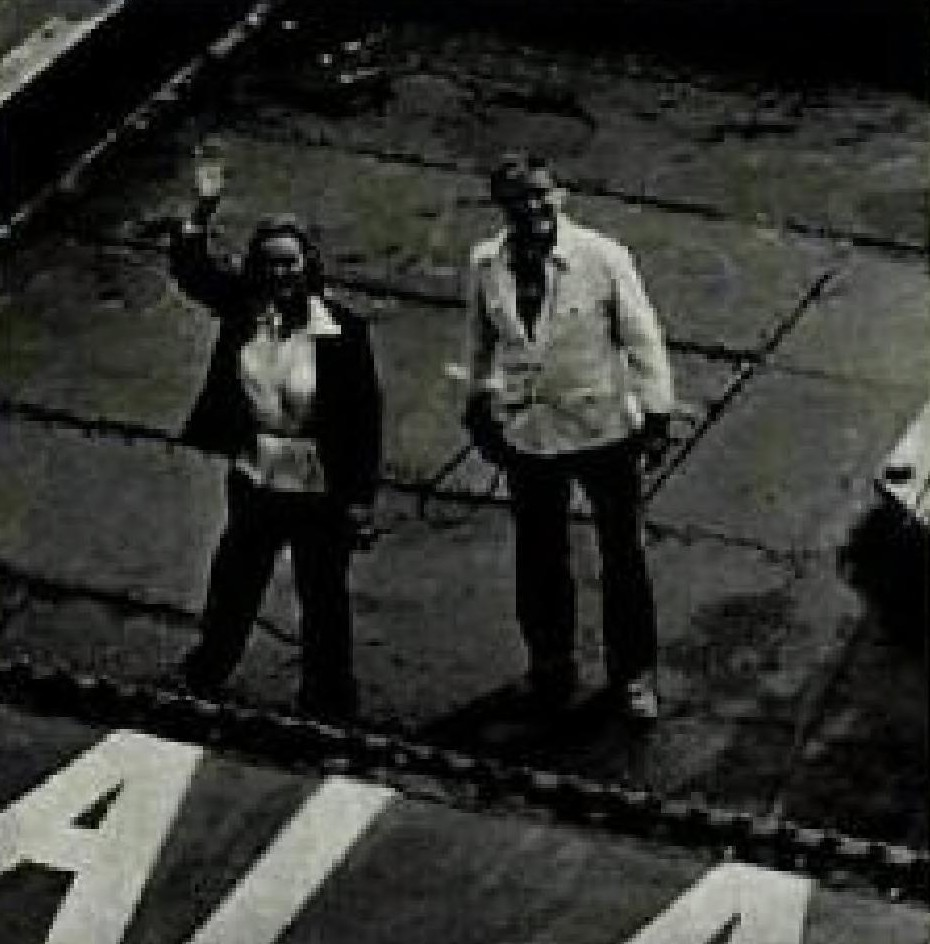
Roy (right) and Joan Bates on Sealand in 1978

In 1978, a West German businessman, Alexander Achenbach along with other West Germans and Dutch, invaded Sealand and took Bates's son, Michael, hostage. Bates and others then launched a counterattack in the early hours of the morning to recapture the fort. He held the German and Dutch men as prisoners of war. As one had accepted a Sealand Passport, he was held and convicted of treason while the rest were released. Germany then sent a diplomat to Britain to ask for intervention but Britain claimed they did not have jurisdiction. West Germany then sent a diplomat to Sealand directly to negotiate the release of the prisoner. He was released, and the act of diplomatic negotiation was claimed by Roy Bates to be de facto recognition of Sealand, which Germany has denied.

== Later life and death ==
Bates retired and lived in England during his later life. His son Michael was then in charge of the administration of Sealand as "Prince Regent", although he lived on the British mainland. On 9 October 2012, he died quietly at a care home in Leigh-on-Sea, Essex after having had Alzheimer's for several years. His funeral took place at Southend-on-Sea Crematorium.

He was survived by his wife Joan and their children, son Michael and daughter Penny. Michael reacted to his father's death by recalling him as a "huge, huge character". "I might die young or I might die old, but I will never die of boredom", Bates said in a 1980s interview.

Titles in pretence
New title Sealand established	Prince of Sealand; 1967–2012 with Prince Michael as prince regent (1999–2012)	Succeeded by Michael Bates
