= HM Fort Roughs =

Naval fort off the coasts of Suffolk and Essex, United Kingdom

HM Fort Roughs
- Rough Sands, off the coast of Essex
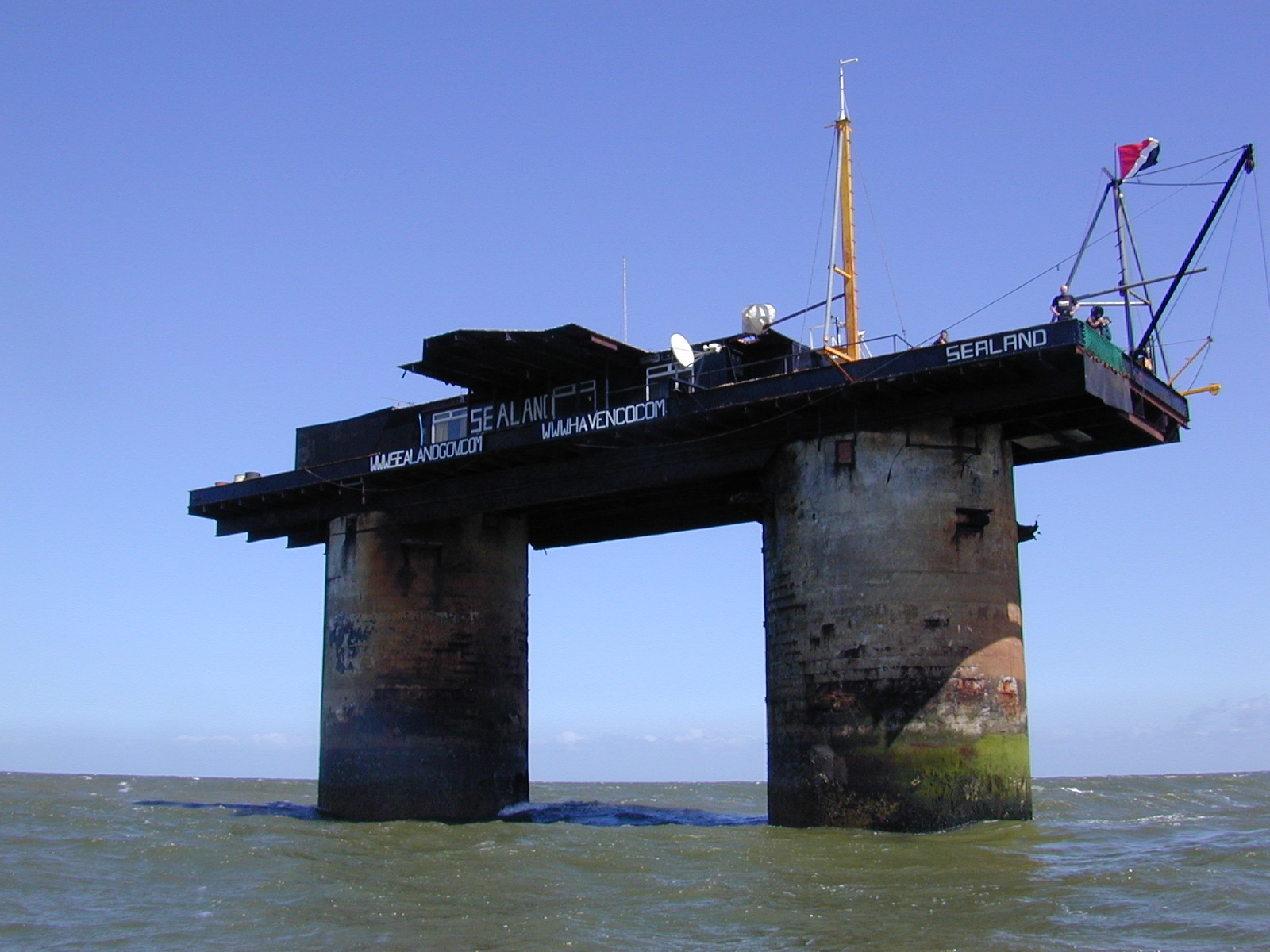
- The fort in 2007

Site information
- Type: Offshore fortress
- Owner: United Kingdom; Sealand (claim unrecognised)
- Controlled by: Sealand (de facto)

Location
- Coordinates: 51°53′42.6″N 1°28′49.8″E

Site history
- Built: 1942
- In use: 1942–1956
- Battles/wars: World War II

HM Fort Roughs is one of several World War II installations that were designed by Guy Maunsell and known collectively as His Majesty's Forts or as Maunsell Sea Forts; the purpose of which was to guard the port of Harwich, Essex, and more broadly, the Thames estuary. This 4,500 ton artificial naval installation is similar in some respects to "fixed" offshore oil platforms. It is situated on Rough Sands, a sandbar located approximately 11 kilometres (6 nmi) from the coast of Suffolk and 13 kilometres (7 nmi) from the coast of Essex. Today it is the location and de-facto capital of the unrecognised, self-proclaimed state of Sealand.

== History ==
=== 1942: Construction, positioning, occupation ===
The stages involved in sinking of the naval fort.

As a contemporary historical society notes, Fort Roughs or the "Rough Towers" was "the first of originally four naval forts designed by G. Maunsell to protect the Thames Estuary." The artificial sea fort was constructed in dry dock at Red Lion Wharf, Gravesend, in the year preceding and into 1942.

This artificial naval installation is similar in some respects to early "fixed" offshore oil platforms. It consisted of a rectangular 168-by-88-foot (51 by 27 m) reinforced concrete pontoon base with a support superstructure of two 60-foot (18 m) tall, 24-foot (7.3 m) diameter hollow reinforced concrete towers, walls roughly 3.5 inches (9 cm) thick; overall weight is estimated to have been approximately 4,500 tons. The twin concrete supporting towers were divided into seven floors, four for crew quarters; the remainder provided dining, operational, and storage areas, e.g., for several generators, and for fresh water tanks and antiaircraft munitions. There was a steel framework at one end supporting a landing jetty and crane which was used to hoist supplies aboard; the wooden landing stage itself became known as a "dolphin".

The towers were joined above the eventual waterline by a steel platform deck upon which other structures could be added; this became a gun deck, on which an upper deck and a central tower unit were constructed. QF 3.7 inch anti-aircraft guns were positioned at each end of this main deck, with a further two Bofors 40 mm anti-aircraft guns and the central tower radar installations atop a central living area that contained a galley, medical, and officers' quarters.

The fort was towed from the degaussing station at Tilbury docks by four tugs—"Dapper", "Crested Cock", "King Lear" and "Lady Brassey". Although setting off from Tilbury docks on the morning of 9 February 1942, an eventful journey meant that it did not reach its final destination until 16:00 on 11 February 1942. Held in place by the tug "Dapper", its base was then intentionally flooded so that it sank in about 37 feet (11 m) of water, coming to rest on the sandbar at 16:45. Its location on Rough Sands, approximately 10 miles off the Harwich seafront, was at the time situated in international waters although the superstructure of the vessel above the waterline remained visible from the coast of England.

HM Fort Roughs was in operation within 30 minutes of being launched: the crew had been aboard during the fitting out in harbour and were well acquainted with the fort's equipment. Approximately 100 men were assigned to the barge before deployment on Rough Sands; thereafter, the fort was occupied by 150–300 Royal Navy personnel, which continued throughout World War II. At the conclusion of hostilities all original personnel were evacuated from HM Fort Roughs.

=== 1956: Removal of full-time HMG personnel ===
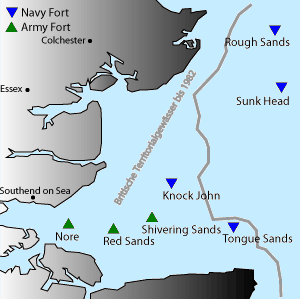
The locations of the seven Maunsell Forts off the east coast of England with HM Fort Roughs top right.

British government official entities used Roughs Tower for a variety of purposes until 1956 when all full-time personnel were finally removed. Roughs Tower remained identified by name on buoys placed in position by the Ministry of Defence which are maintained under an arrangement with Trinity House. Their purpose is to warn vessels of this obstacle, especially in time of fog because busy shipping lanes criss-cross the area with vessels going to and from the container Port of Felixstowe, Suffolk, and the Port of Harwich, Essex. UK Ordnance Survey now identify the former sea barge fort as Roughs Tower on their charts.

=== 1966: Occupation ===
In 1966 Paddy Roy Bates, who operated Radio Essex, and Ronan O'Rahilly, who operated Radio Caroline, landed on and occupied Fort Roughs. After disagreements, Bates seized the tower as his own. O'Rahilly attempted to storm the fort in 1967 but Bates thwarted the attack with guns and petrol bombs. As a result the British Royal Marines went to the fort and ordered Bates to surrender and received warning shots fired by Bates' son Michael. The pair were arrested and charged with weapons offences but the court threw the case out as it did not have jurisdiction beyond the territorial waters of Britain. Bates took this as de facto recognition of his country and seven years later issued a constitution, flag, and national anthem, among other things, for the Principality of Sealand (founded on 2 September 1967). In 1978, a German businessman, along with some other Germans and Dutchmen invaded Roughs Tower but Bates recaptured it and finally released them, after a visit by a diplomat from the German embassy in London.

== Climate ==
Climate data for HM Fort Roughs (51°53.71′N 1°28.83′E)
Month	Jan	Feb	Mar	Apr	May	Jun	Jul	Aug	Sep	Oct	Nov	Dec	Year
Record high °C (°F)	15.1 (59.2)	18.2 (64.8)	21.6 (70.9)	25.4 (77.7)	28.5 (83.3)	32.2 (90.0)	35.1 (95.2)	34.8 (94.6)	29.7 (85.5)	24.9 (76.8)	18.8 (65.8)	15.5 (59.9)	35.1 (95.2)
Mean daily maximum °C (°F)	7.8 (46.0)	8.1 (46.6)	10.5 (50.9)	13.2 (55.8)	16.4 (61.5)	19.3 (66.7)	21.6 (70.9)	21.6 (70.9)	19.1 (66.4)	15.1 (59.2)	11.0 (51.8)	8.3 (46.9)	14.3 (57.7)
Daily mean °C (°F)	5.2 (41.4)	5.3 (41.5)	7.1 (44.8)	9.4 (48.9)	12.4 (54.3)	15.3 (59.5)	17.6 (63.7)	17.6 (63.7)	15.3 (59.5)	11.9 (53.4)	8.2 (46.8)	5.7 (42.3)	10.9 (51.6)
Mean daily minimum °C (°F)	2.6 (36.7)	2.4 (36.3)	3.7 (38.7)	5.5 (41.9)	8.4 (47.1)	11.3 (52.3)	13.5 (56.3)	13.6 (56.5)	11.5 (52.7)	8.7 (47.7)	5.4 (41.7)	3.1 (37.6)	7.5 (45.5)
Record low °C (°F)	−11.2 (11.8)	−10.5 (13.1)	−8.1 (17.4)	−3.2 (26.2)	−1.1 (30.0)	2.8 (37.0)	5.9 (42.6)	5.5 (41.9)	2.2 (36.0)	−3.5 (25.7)	−6.4 (20.5)	−9.8 (14.4)	−11.2 (11.8)
Average precipitation mm (inches)	45.3 (1.78)	35.1 (1.38)	36.8 (1.45)	38.2 (1.50)	42.5 (1.67)	45.1 (1.78)	44.7 (1.76)	48.2 (1.90)	46.5 (1.83)	56.4 (2.22)	55.2 (2.17)	51.0 (2.01)	545.0 (21.46)
Source: Met Office (Regional Coastal Averages)

== Location ==
According to the Admiralty chart the fort's location is at 51°53.71′N 1°28.83′E. The structure is marked by east and west cardinal buoys. Other references (taken from land-based maps) are Ordnance Survey grid reference TM3964227615, and on OpenStreetMap within 200 meters of the chart location 51°53′42.6″N 1°28′49.8″E.
