= List of boating magazines =

A boating magazine is a publication whose main topic is boating, new boat reviews, boat motors and watersports. They can be aimed at different water sports enthusiasts including: cruisers, fishers, power boaters, skiers, sailors, racers, regional boaters, yachters, et cetera.

Boating magazines include:

- Afloat (ISSN 2207-6271)
- Australian Sailing
- Boating
- Boat International
- Boating Life
- International Boat Industry
- BoatUS
- Chesapeake Bay Magazine
- The Ensign (United States Power Squadrons magazine)
- Lakeland Boating
- Yachting Life Magazine
- Northeast Boating Magazine
- On the Water
- Plugboats (Electric and hybrid boats only)
- Sea History
- Ships Monthly
- Yaahting (parody)
- Yachting
- Yachting World
- WoodenBoat
