= Chapman Elementary School =

Chapman Elementary School may refer to:

- Chapman Elementary School of the Portland Public Schools in Oregon
- Chapman Elementary School in Spartanburg County School District 7, South Carolina

== See also ==
- Chapman High School (disambiguation)
- Chapman School of Seamanship, in Florida
- Chapman University, in California
