= Daven A. Anderson =

American oil and watercolor painter

Daven A. Anderson (born June 30, 1943) is an American oil and watercolor painter who is known for his representational paintings, especially marine scenes.

== Early life and career ==
Anderson was born in Washington, D.C. and raised in Oak Park, Illinois. He attended the United States Naval Academy, Annapolis, Maryland earning a Bachelor's in Engineering, studied nuclear engineering while in the Navy, and served in the nuclear submarine navy. He earned an MBA from the University of Chicago. Anderson is a self-taught artist with paintings in various collections, including the permanent collections of the Channel Islands Maritime Museum, the Maritime Museum of San Diego, Evansville Museum of Arts, History and Science, the Missouri Historical Society, the United States Naval Academy, the Rosemary Berkel and Henry L. Crisp II Museum, the Erie maritime Museum, the Kenosha Public Museum, the United States Coast Guard Art Museum and the St. Louis Mercantile Art Museum. Anderson taught watercolor for two years at the University of Missouri Saint Louis. In 2018, he taught workshops in museums, on Celebrity and American cruises, and co-led a 16-day plein air painting tour of China. Anderson has been the executive director of the Missouri Watercolor Society since 2015, and the managing director of the American Society of Marine Artists from 2014 to 2018.

== Achievements ==
Anderson has had seventeen museum exhibitions. His series of 65 works in oil and watercolor, THE RIVERS: A Celebration of Life and Work on America's Waterways, was exhibited in seven American museums. A 144-page color exhibition catalog accompanied the exhibitions. In March 2017, Anderson received the Donald T. Wright Award, presented biennially by the Herman T. Pott National Inland Waterway Collection of the St. Louis Mercantile Library and Art Museum in recognition of a body of work that contributes significantly to a better understanding of the American inland waterways. Anderson is a signature member of various art societies in the United States and a member of the St. Louis Artists Guild. Anderson's work has been featured in news magazines, including the National Maritime Historical Society's magazine, Sea History. He has been interviewed on radio and TV in the United States and China.
