= Power squadron =

Within the North American recreational boating community, the term Power Squadron is used colloquially to refer either to the national body or to any local chapter of the following organizations:

- Canadian Power and Sail Squadrons
- United States Power Squadrons
