= AMU =

As an abbreviation, AMU may refer to:

- Acute medical unit, a short-stay department of some hospitals
- Adam Mickiewicz University, Poznań, Poland
- African and Malagasy Union
- African Mathematical Union
- Agency for the Modernisation of Ukraine
- Aix-Marseille University, Aix-en-Provence/Marseille, France
- Aligarh Muslim University, Aligarh, India
- American Military University, Charles Town, West Virginia
- Antarctic Micronational Union
- Arab Maghreb Union
- Armenian Mathematical Union
- Asian Monetary Unit
- Dalton (unit), also known as unified atomic mass unit, a unit used to express atomic and molecular masses
- Auxiliary Memory Units
- Ave Maria University, Florida, US
- Northern Rhodesian African Mineworkers' Union, a former Northern Rhodesian trade union
- United States Army Marksmanship Unit
- United States Army Medical Unit

Amu may refer to:

- Amu (film), Indian film starring Konkona Sen Sharma
- Amu Hinamori, a fictional character from the manga series Shugo Chara! by Peach-Pit
- Amu Darya, a river in central Asia
- Amu (pharaoh)

== See also ==
- Ammu (disambiguation)
