= Louise Marler =

American artist

Louise Anne Marler
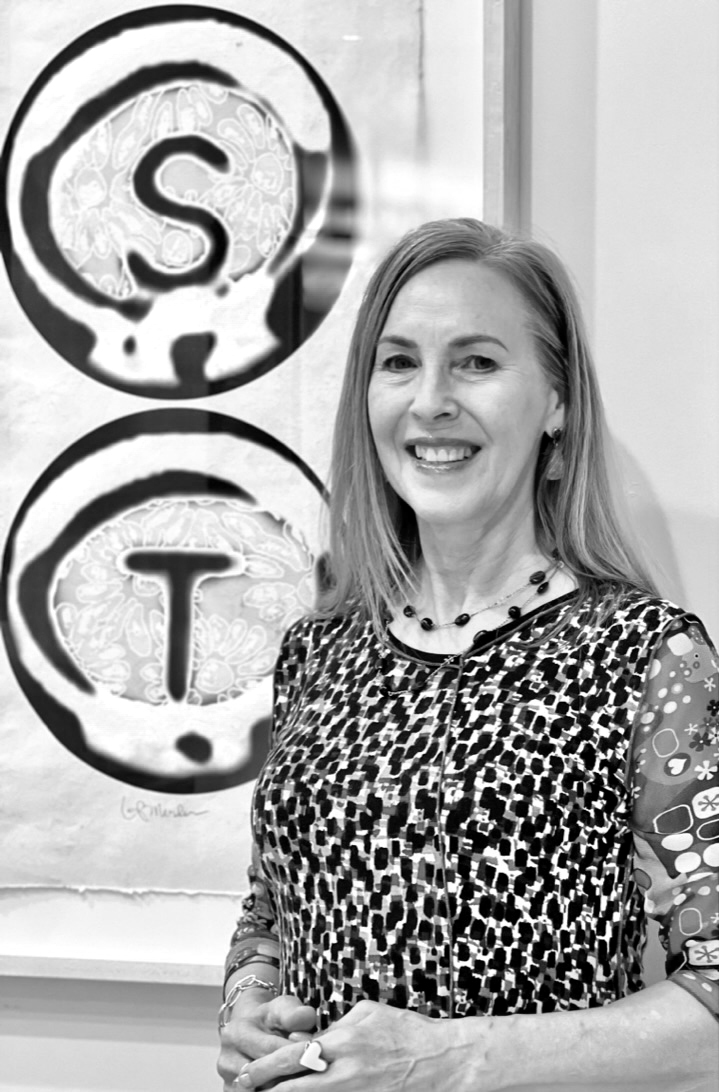
- Photograph of Louise Marler by Anna Broenink in 2024
- Born: 1963 (age 62–63); St. Louis, Missouri, U.S.
- Website: www.lamarler.com

Louise Anne Marler is an American artist who works across photography, graphic arts, experimental techniques, painting, and collage. Marler is known for work depicting analog and broadcast media including mid-century typewriters, cameras, radios, and televisions. In 2003, Marler began to use “LA Marler” as her artistic identity.

Marler's work engages visual traditions of text art, pop art, and language. She differentiates her work from other pop artists in her deliberate use of original photography rather than stock, public domain, or commercial images. Marler's work is a dialogue between analog and digital art, situated in her experience as a Gen X commercial graphic arts and lithographic printer, and later fine artist reflecting on the transition from analog to digital media production and storytelling. Marler has also received attention for her “KeyWords” series, that engages with typewriter aesthetics, SEO and digital marketing language, and spiritually-distilled statements.

Her work is featured in the films and TV shows including the documentary, The Typewriter in the 21st Century, the movies Friends with Benefits, Grand Daddy Day Care, Girls Code, and the TV shows, Two and a Half Men, Curb Your Enthusiasm, The Mentalist, Criminal Minds, Scandal, Here and Now, Jane the Virgin, Dear White People, Lucifer, Arrested Development, and others.

== Biography ==
Louise Marler was born in St. Louis, Missouri in 1963. Her father inherited and operated a small typewriter sales and repair shop in St. Louis. By the 1980s, it evolved into selling office equipment. Her mother was a home economics high school teacher. In 1985, Marler received a B.S. in Business Administration, Southeast Missouri State University with a major in marketing and minor in psychology.

Marler moved to Los Angeles in 1987, and started working as a production manager in an international magazine. There she supervised writing, translation, and layout. From 1988-1990, she worked at the Gemological Institute of America in the marketing department. In 1990, Louise started Marler Marketing, which specialized in graphic design and print brokering.

In 1995, Marler Marketing partnered with a pressman and bought Nu Era Printing, changing the name to New Era Printing. The purchase included a Heidelberg Press and Ryobi One Color Press, commercial printing tools, and a darkroom. The company acquired a new additional Two Color Ryobi press in 1996 in order to satisfy four color printing requests. They were hired by local startup companies to make logos, brochures, and other printed matter.

She also made packaging prototypes and cut board concepts for Barbie from 2007-2010 as a contractor for Mattel, and Deutsch LA. At New Business Environmental Graphics she also printed and installed immersive presentations.

== Fine art ==
Marler started her independent art career in 2000, printing original work for a commercial t-shirt line, in addition to novelty gift items, and working out of an art studio in a former airplane mechanic hangar at the Santa Monica Airport. She began creating experimental photographic prints with a large-format printer, and developing her fine art pop art style. Louise Marler created her first typewriter art series in 2004. Taking photographs of her family's typewriter collection, brightly colorizing the photographs adding playful captions above in her pop art, TypOwriters. This was her first series with typewriters as a main subject. In the 2010s, Marler taught printmaking classes at Santa Monica College and did studio work, environmental graphics, and immersive presentations for Deutch L.A..

In 2006, Marler documented a junkyard of rusty Chevrolet wrecked cars and trucks in Ste. Genevieve, Missouri. As an art activist, environmentalist, her first gallery exhibit was combined with Horace Bristol postumus work with his son, Henri Bristol in Santa Barbara. Marler called her close-up, saturated color photos, “Oil is History.”

In 2011, Marler's typewriter art was featured in Typewriters in the 21st Century, with Marler interviewed about her role in the popularity of art about typewriters. Many others have since started to make typewriter art, and sell and repair typewriters. Her first gallery exhibit of the Typewriter Art took place at Raw Style gallery in 2011. In 2014, Marler started The Type Inn, a live-in gallery, writer's retreat in Joshua Tree, California, which contains original art and usable manual typewriters.

In 2016, Marler curated the show F451 at Mike Kelley Gallery in Venice, California, featuring the artists Shepard Fairey, Robbie Conal and others.

== The TypOsphere StL ==
In 2021, Marler started to exhibit the antique typewriter collection the family amassed as local tradespeople, on Cherokee St. (Antique Row) in St. Louis. She started The TypOsphere StL, LA Marler Gallery, a mini museum of the family's antique typewriter collection on exhibit with fine art and handmade novelties.

== Selected exhibits ==
- Rancho Mirage Library, 10th Rancho Mirage Writer's Fest, December 2023-February 2024
- Unplugged, LA Art Show, Galerie De’Arts, Santa Monica February 2023. Curated by Deepa Subramanian
- Digital Americana, Crisp Museum, SEMO, solo retrospective, October 2021
- New York Art Expo, ArtBlend, New York City, NY, April 2019
- Media Icons, DNJ Gallery, Bergamot Station, Santa Monica, CA, January - February, 2019
- Spectrum Art Fair, ArtBlend, Miami, Florida, December 2018
- Eminent Domain, Robert Miller Gallery, New York, NY, July 2018
- Keywords, DNJ Gallery, Santa Monica, CA, November 2017
- Rancho Mirage Library, California, January 2017
- The Desert Trip, Coachella, CA, October 2016
- F451, Mike Kelley Gallery, Venice, California, September 2016, curated
- Leica Gallery, Los Angeles, West Hollywood, CA, May 2016
- Garden of Autos, Torrance Art Museum, August 2014
- TypOWriters, Rancho Mirage Library, First Writer's Fest, 2013
- Mike Kelley Gallery, Venice, CA, September 2012
- Changarrito, Craft and Folk Art Museum, Los Angeles, CA, May 2012
- Arena 1 SaMo Art Studios, Santa Monica, California, September 2011
- California TypOwriters, Manhattan Beach Arts Center Manhattan Beach, November 2009
- Topanga Community Center, Earth Day, curated group exhibition, including Dianna Cohen and Linda Vallejo, April 2009
- East/West Gallery, Santa Barbara, California, CA, August 2006
- Bergamot Station 30 year anniversary, bG Gallery, Bergamot Station, Santa Monica, September 2024

== Collected by ==
- National Museum of American History - Business and Industry, Smithsonian Institution
- Rosemary Berkel and Harry L. Crisp II Museum, Southeast Missouri State University, SEMO Archive, Louise Marler
- Emerson College, Los Angeles
- Rancho Mirage Library and Observatory

== Additional sources ==
- Richard Polt. (2015). The Typewriter Revolution: A Typist's Companion for the 21st Century. The Countryman Press.
