= Charles Frederic Chapman =

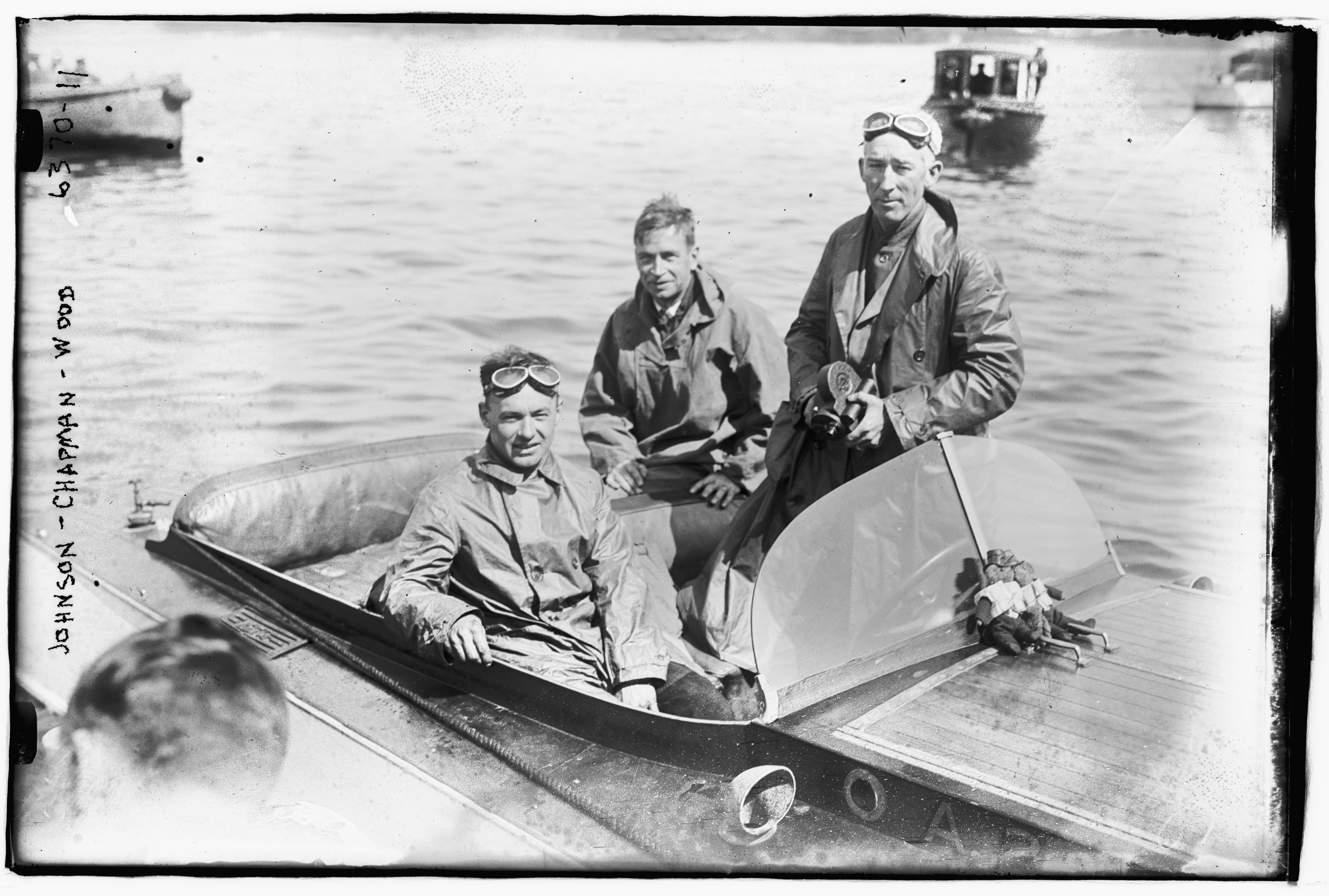
- Born: January 4, 1881; Norwich, Connecticut
- Died: March 21, 1976 (aged 95); Essex, Connecticut
- Other names: "Chap"
- Occupations: Editor, author, boater
- Known for: Chapman Piloting

Charles Frederic Chapman (January 4, 1881 - March 21, 1976) was an avid boater, editor of Hearst's Motor Boating magazine from 1912 to 1968, co-founder of the United States Power Squadrons, co-founder of the Chapman School of Seamanship and author of the standard boating reference work, Chapman Piloting.

== Early life ==
Chapman was born in Norwich, Connecticut, in 1881. After high school at the Norwich Free Academy, he studied naval architecture and marine engineering at Cornell University, graduating in 1905. At Cornell, he was a member of the Phi Kappa Tau fraternity. Chapman then settled in Manhattan and joined the New York Motor Boat Club where he later became commodore. He served as secretary of the American Power Boat Association for 25 years and as chairman of the association's racing commission.

Chapman was active in powerboating and racing and, in 1912, was brought to the attention of William Randolph Hearst who hired him to edit Motor Boating magazine which he did for 56 years. In 1914, Chapman was among ten men who founded the United States Power Squadrons. Not only did he design the organization's ensign, but he also served variously as treasurer, vice commander, and chief commander.

In later years, while living in Plandome, Long Island, he was Commodore of the Manhasset Bay Yacht Club.

== Chapman Piloting ==
In 1916, then Assistant Secretary of the Navy Franklin D. Roosevelt asked Chapman to write an instruction manual to teach small-boat seamanship to members of the Navy Reserve. The next year, the 144-page Practical Motor Boat Handling, Seamanship, and Piloting was published. After six revisions, the manual was renamed in 1922 to Piloting, Seamanship & Small Boat Handling. The book has been in print ever since and as of 2013 was in the 67th edition.

== Death ==
Chapman died of a heart attack in Essex, Connecticut, on March 21, 1976, at the age of 95.

== See also ==
- Chapman School of Seamanship
