= The TypOsphere StL =

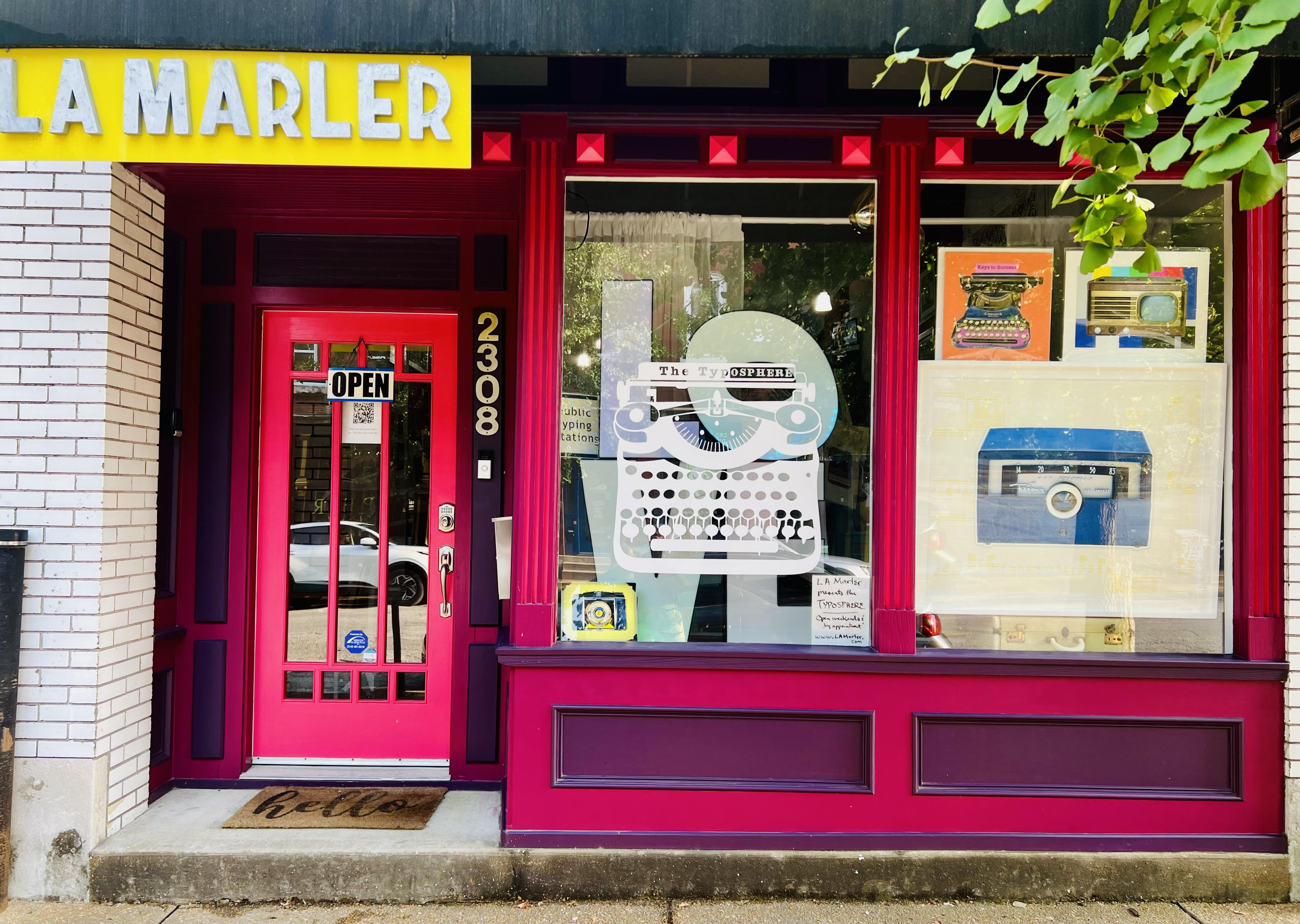
- Established: 2021
- Location: 2308 Cherokee Street, St. Louis, Missouri 63118
- Type: Art museum
- Key holdings: 150+ antique typewriters
- Founder: Louise Marler

The TypOsphere StL is a hybrid typewriter museum, manual typewriter repair shop, and art gallery on Cherokee Street, known as "Antique row" in St. Louis, Missouri.

== History ==
In 2021, The TypOsphere was started by artist Louise Marler, who is the third generation in her family to specialize in typewriters. The gallery now contains 150+ antique typewriters, and includes typing stations, and does typewriter repair.

The Typ0sphere has loaned typewriters out to museums including the Rosemary Berkel and Harry L. Crisp II Museum, and made a typewriter donation to the National Museum of American History, Work and Industry Collection in 2016.

=== Background ===
In 1927, Lawrence Marler Sr. joined the United States Army, where he learned typewriter repair while stationed in Hawaii. After returning from service, he worked for Royal Typewriter Company in Memphis, Tennessee. By 1939, he and his wife, Estella started a shop on Lawler St. in Normandy, a then suburb of St. Louis. By 1958, Marler & Co. Business Machines had become Auto-typist Sales and Service, which engaged in maintenance and repair and had a showroom for the sale of machines. Marler Office Machines was kept going in the 1990s by Laura Marler and her partner, Victor Smith.

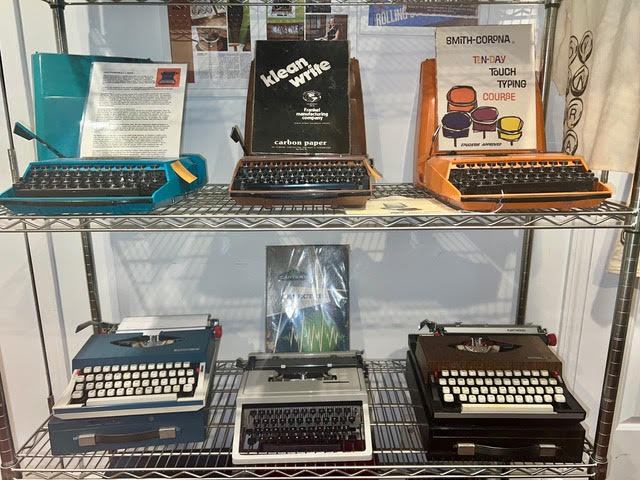

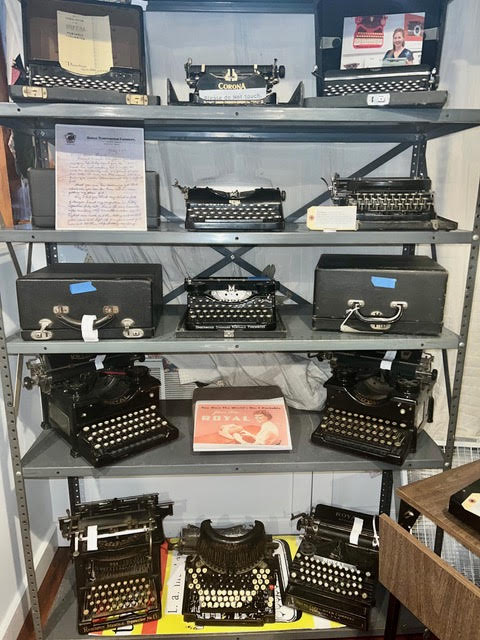

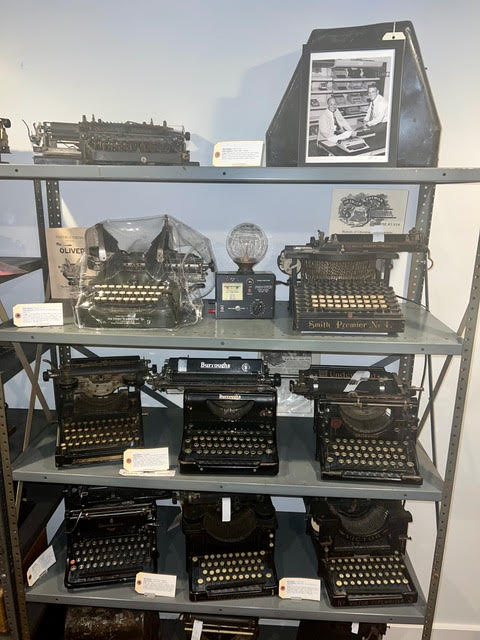

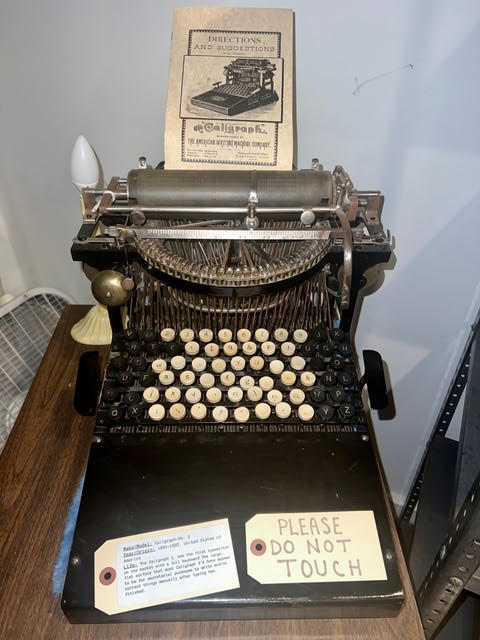
