= Ammu =

Ammu may refer to:

== Fiction ==
- Ammu (1965 film), an Indian film
- Ammu (2022 film), an Indian film
- Ammu Ipe, a character in the Indian novel The God of Small Things

== People ==
Ammu is an Indian feminine given name:

- Ammu Abhirami, actress
- Ammu Swaminathan, social worker and political activist
- Ammu Joseph, journalist, author, media analyst and editorial consultant

== See also ==
- Amu (disambiguation)
- Ammu Aahotepre, Hyksos pharaoh of ancient Egypt
