= Chapman Piloting =

Boating reference book first published 1917

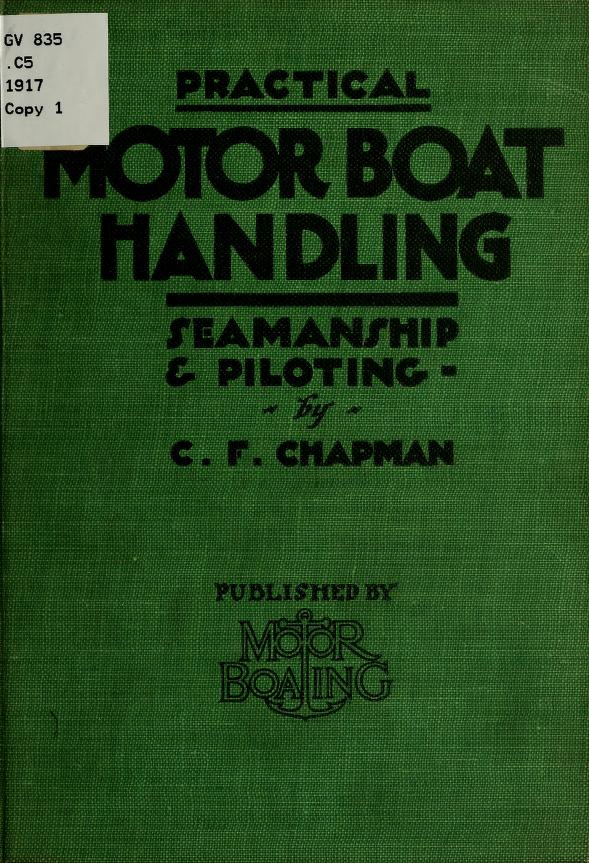
- Cover of the original first edition
- Author: Charles Frederic Chapman
- Publication date: 1917

Chapman Piloting & Seamanship, published by Hearst Books, (Note: a division of Sterling Publishing Co., Inc.) has been a leading reference book for power and sail boaters for nearly 100 years. Known as "the Bible of Boating", more than 3 million copies have been printed.

The 69th edition (2021) has 920 pages, 1,500 full-color illustrations and charts, and exploded views and cutaways and updated with information on federal laws, regulations, and fees. It includes much popular new technology – especially communications and electronic navigation/common surveying equipment: GPS, radar, depth sounders/fish finders, chart plotters. It also reviews most common other marine goods and devices such as engines, solar panels, batteries, pumps and osmosis/treatment units.

It contains authoritative information about boating rules, weather, tide, currents, navigation, seamanship for powerboats, small craft, and boats under sail; anchoring, communications, and navigation; inland boating, marlinspike seamanship, and boating customs. It is often used as the text for private boating schools throughout the U.S.

It is the officially recommended book for the U.S. Coast Guard's boating education classes and many local United States Power Squadrons.

== History ==
The work originated in 1917.

The original author, Charles Frederic Chapman (1881–1976), was an avid boater, and the editor of Hearst's Motor Boating Magazine from 1912 to 1968. During World War I, the U.S. Government needed to train men in the Navy, Coast Guard and Merchant Marine to become operators of small boats, including landing craft, utility craft, gigs, patrol craft. Then Assistant U.S. Secretary of the Navy, Franklin D. Roosevelt, commissioned Chapman to write a manual that could be used to help provide that training. Chapman did this in three days, drawing largely on articles that had appeared in Motor Boating Magazine.

The result was Practical Boat Handling, the first edition of which was published in 1917 with 144 pages, 5 × 7 in.. From this, the book evolved through many editions into Piloting, Seamanship & Small Boat Handling. The book title has now been shortened to Chapman Piloting & Seamanship. Chapman was one of the original founders of the United States Power Squadrons.
