= On the Water =

On the Water may refer to:

- On the Water (magazine), an American fishing and boating magazine
- On the Water (novel), a 1998 novel by Hans Maarten van den Brink
- On the Water (album), a 2011 album by Future Islands
- On the Water (film), a 2020 film
- "On the Water" (song), a 2023 song by James Barker Band

== See also ==
- On the Waters, a 1970 album by Bread
