= Grand Rapids Yacht Club =

Yacht club

Coordinates: 42.94955°N 85.61115°W

- Burgee
- Full name: Grand Rapids Yacht Club
- Short name: GRYC
- Founded: 1931
- Location: 740 Lakeside Drive SE East Grand Rapids, Michigan
- Commodore: Louise Finkelstein
- Website: http://www.grandrapidsyachtclub.org

The Grand Rapids Yacht Club is a yacht club located on Reeds Lake in East Grand Rapids, Michigan. It was established in 1931 by R. Wallace Hook on his lakeshore property on the south shore of the lake.

== History ==
The Grand Rapids Yacht Club first opened in 1931 on the lawn of its first Commodore, R. Wallace Hook. In the mid-1930s, the club moved from its original location, renting a building at Point Paulo two seasons. However, it moved to the north shore of Reeds Lake in the Manhattan Beach area, a popular public beach by the former steamer, Ramona. It reportedly moved because of the disruption of the steam ship.

The present site on the west end of the lake was purchased in 1941. The clubhouse built at the present location lasted until July 4, 1956, when it caught fire. The current clubhouse was constructed in the same location and was featured in Lakeland Boating magazine. In 1960, the club purchased additional land on its north side, part of which later provided space for additional boat storage. In 1993, a major renovation was initiated and was completed in the spring of 1995.

== Activities ==
Along with social events held throughout the year, sailboat races are held weekly during the summer months at the Grand Rapids Yacht Club. The following fleets are active at GRYC:

- MC Scow
- Laser
- Snipe
- Butterfly
- Opti
- Rebel
- 420

The yacht club also hosts the East Grand Rapids High School sailing team each fall.
