= Northeast Boating Magazine =

Logo of Northeast Boating Magazine.

Northeast Boating Magazine was a regional magazine focused on boating and leisure in New England and the US East Coast. It was a sister publication to Chesapeake Bay Magazine and covered parallel topics, such as boat reviews, information on marinas, marine services, and coastal destinations.

== Background ==
The magazine was based in Quincy, Massachusetts. It was renamed Northeast Boating Magazine in 2007, having been founded as Offshore Magazine. The name change was aimed at dialing in on the magazine's key demographic, i.e., northeast boaters.

== Awards ==
At the 2008 Boating Writers International Excellence in Boating Journalism contest, Northeast Boating took home 8 awards.

== Other ==
The December 2009 issue of Northeast Boating Magazine was its last, having succumbed to pressure from a tough economy and shrinking boating market.

== See also ==
- Sailing
- Fishing
- Yacht racing
