= Deepa Subramanian =

Art curator

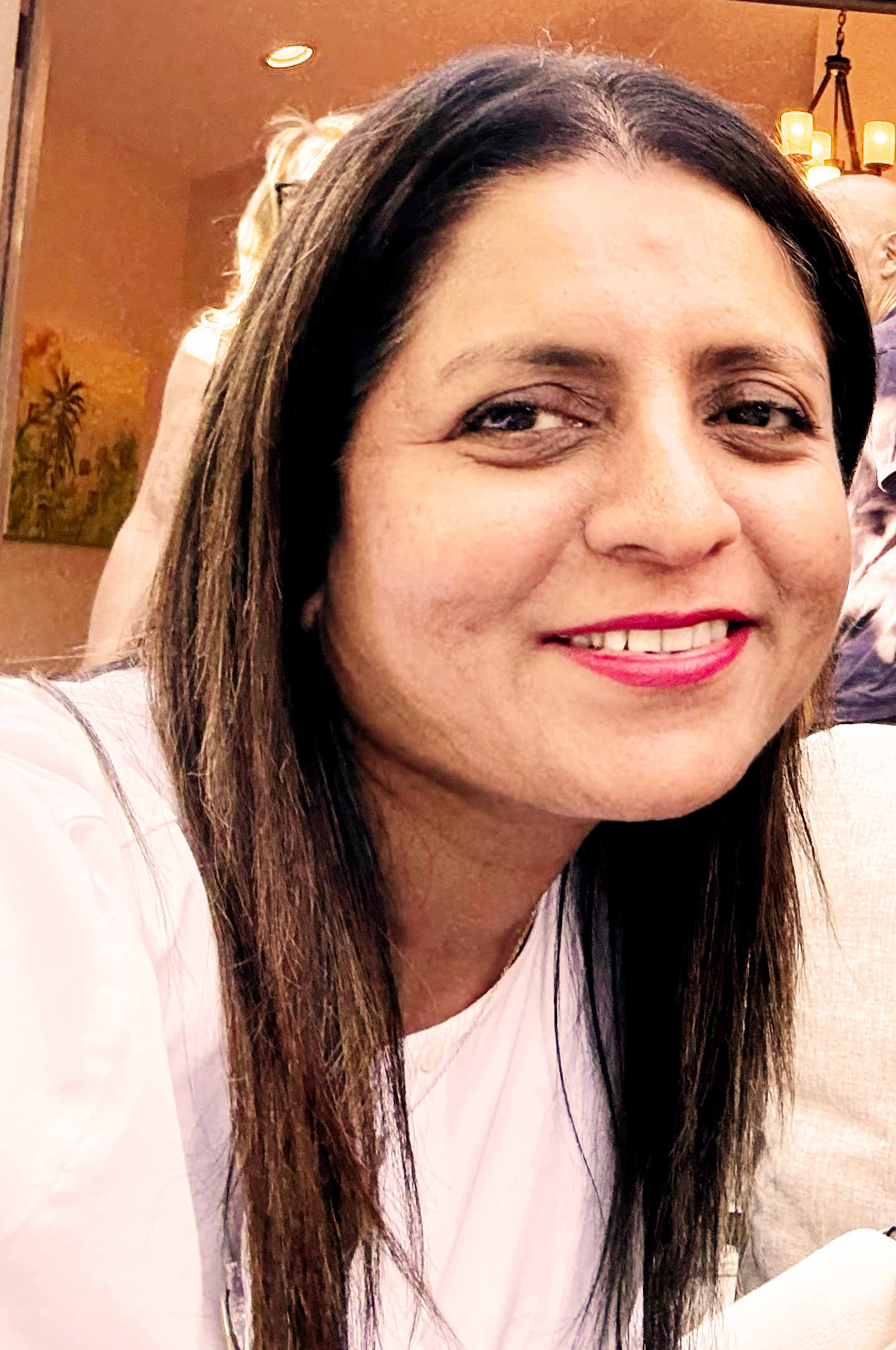
- Deepa Subramanian at Galerie De'Arts, Santa Monica, CA. 2025.
- Born: 1968 (age 57–58); Chennai, India
- Education: University of Madras
- Occupations: Art curator and gallerist

Deepa Subramanian (born 1968) is an Indian-American curator, art gallerist and an entrepreneur based in Los Angeles, California, United States.

She grew up in Chennai, India, and graduated from Madras University in 1988. In 2001, she co-founded a supply chain management business in pharmaceutical chemicals.

In March 2009, she founded Galerie De'Arts, a contemporary art gallery in Bangalore, India in the precinct, Barton Centre. Galerie De'Arts represented established and emerging artists from South India. She has curated several art exhibitions in Bangalore, India and has worked with pioneering artists like S.G.Vasudev , Yusuf Arakkal and Balan Nambiar . The gallery closed post-COVID-19 in 2021.

In 2017, she moved to Los Angeles, California. Since 2018, she has been curating art exhibitions in the United States including "Intersections" which she co-curated for the PST Art, an initiative by the J. Paul Getty Museum, and "1:1" a digital art show for the DNA Digital Art Festival, Santa Monica. In 2025. She founded Galerie De’Arts in Santa Monica, CA.

She was first appointed Arts Commissioner of Santa Monica, California for term June 25, 2019 to June 30, 2023. She was appointed a second time for the term July 25, 2023 to June 30, 2027. She also serves as Chair, Public Arts Committee within the Santa Monica Arts Commission, which is an advisory body to the City Council. Deepa was one of the jurors along with Christine Messineo, Director, Americas, Frieze Art Fair and Anne Ellegood Executive Director of the Los Angeles Institute of Contemporary Art for the selection of Edgar Ramirez's art work, Baji (2023) for the Santa Monica Art Bank Collection at the Frieze Art Fair Los Angeles, 2023.

== Pharmaceutical/Nutraceutical Industry ==
In 2001, Subramanian co-founded DESA India, a Supply Chain Management company in Pharmaceutical Chemicals in Bangalore, India. She founded DESA Life Sciences, LLC, Santa Monica, California in 2019, an SCM space in Neutraceuticals..

== Notable curatorial works ==
- Summer in Bloom: A floral interpretation by Astrid Preston, Galerie De'Arts, June 2025
- "Intersections" for the PST Art, Art and Science Collide, an initiative by the J.Paul Getty Museum, [Co-curated by Om Bleicher, Sung-Hee-Son and Deepa Subramanian], 2025
- "Intersect Aspen, bG Gallery [booth], Aspen, Colorado, 2025
- Scottsdale Arts Festival, bG Gallery [booth], Scottsdale, Arizona, 2025
- Art Miami, Art Basel, bG Gallery [booth], Miami Beach, Florida, 2025
- Outsider Art Fair, bG Gallery [booth], New York, NY, 2025
- 1:1, DNA Digital Art Festival, Santa Monica, CA, 2024
- LA Marler Solo, L.A. Art Show, Los Angeles Convention Center, Los Angeles, CA, 2023
- Midcentury Modern - Modernism Art & Design Show, Palm Springs, Palm Springs, CA, 2022
- Plugged-Unplugged, LA Marler, Ocean Park, Santa Monica, CA, 2022
- Meditative musings: Berta Negari, Santa Monica, CA, 2022
- Palm Springs Modernism Art and Design Show [booth], Palm Springs, CA, 2022
- Enhanted India, bG Gallery, Santa Monica, CA, 2021
- Intersections, Mike Saijo, bG Gallery, Santa Monica, CA, 2020
- "Poetry in colours" , Galerie De'Arts, Bangalore, 2014
- "Black and White" S.G.Vasudev and Jogen Choudhary, The Ritz Carlton, Bangalore, 2015 [Co-curated by Deepa Subramanian and Jyothirmoy Bhattacharya]
- "Tribute to Ramanujan"- Poetry by A.K.Ramanujan and Drawings by S.G.Vasudev, Galerie De'Arts, Bangalore, 2016
- "Contemporary Pioneers Karnataka" a tribute to K.K.Hebbar conceptualised by Yusuf Arakkal, Galerie De'Arts, Bangalore, 2011
- "Contemporary Pioneers Karnataka" -a tribute to Yusuf Arakkal, Rangoli Metro Art Centre, Bangalore, 2017
- "Monsoon Moods" Milind Nayak, Galerie De'Arts, Bangalore, 2017
- "Fly like a bird: Birds in contemporary art" Rekha Hebbar Rao, Galerie De'Arts, Bangalore
- "Of Masters and heroes" Art residency curated by Vidhya Gnana Gouresan, Singapore and co-curated by Deepa Subramanian 2013
- "Of sounds and silences" Raviram Ramakrishnan, Galerie De'Arts, Bangalore, Aug 2013
- "The Lotus Pond" Milind Nayak, Galerie De'Arts, Bangalore, Nov 2011
- "The unfolding of the self" Shan Re, Galerie De'Arts, Bangalore, Nov 2011
- "Magic of myriad colours" Paresh Hazra and Aditi Hazra, The Taj West End, Bangalore, Nov 2012
- "Charcoal and Gold" Paresh Hazra, Galerie De'Arts, Bangalore,Oct 2010,
- "The many faces of India" 1 MG Mall, Bangalore, 2015
- "Intelligence in the field" by Surendra Kumar Sagar and illustrations by Bharati Sagar, Galerie De'Arts, Bangalore
- "Holy Cow" P.Gnana,Galerie De'Arts, Bangalore, May 2011
- "From Hong Kong to India" Shailaja Gidwani, Galerie De'Arts, Bangalore, 2012
- "Dreams and Realities" Kazi Anirban, Galerie De'Arts, Bangalore, Apr 2010
- "The state of Zen" Shan Re and Romi Revola , Galerie De'Arts, Dec 2009
