= The Ensign (USPS magazine) =

American maritime magazine

- May–June 2009 cover of The Ensign
- Editor: Amy Townsend
- Former editors: Yvonne Hill
- Frequency: Quarterly
- First issue: December 1914
- Company: United States Power Squadrons
- Country: United States
- Based in: Raleigh, North Carolina
- Language: English
- Website: http://www.theensign.org

The Ensign magazine is the official digital publication of the United States Power Squadrons (or USPS). Published at USPS headquarters in Raleigh, North Carolina, The Ensign covers topics of interest to USPS members and other boating enthusiasts.

The Ensign was launched in 1914 and is published quarterly. Most articles are written by USPS members, and all are edited by a professional staff. Each issue contains two to four feature articles related to boating or USPS. Regular columns and departments in The Ensign are

- Bridge–a message from a member of the USPS national Bridge
- Soundings–letters to the editor
- Currents–USPS calendar and news
- Shipshape–in-depth technical articles, how-to tips and safety information
- Ship's Library–book reviews
- Waypoints–local squadron news and activities
- Last Horizon–listing of recently deceased USPS members
- Bitter End–photos, contests, puzzles, nautical quotes and trivia, and stories behind members' boat names

Author Marlin Bree has twice won the West Marine Writer's Award, the top writing award from Boating Writers International, for feature articles published in The Ensign. He won the 2004 award for "A Solo Sailor Meets His Storm of the Century: The Day All Hell Broke Loose," which appeared in the June 2003 issue. Bree also won the 2008 award for "The Old Man and the Inland Sea," which was published in the January–February 2007 issue.
