= S. G. Vasudev =

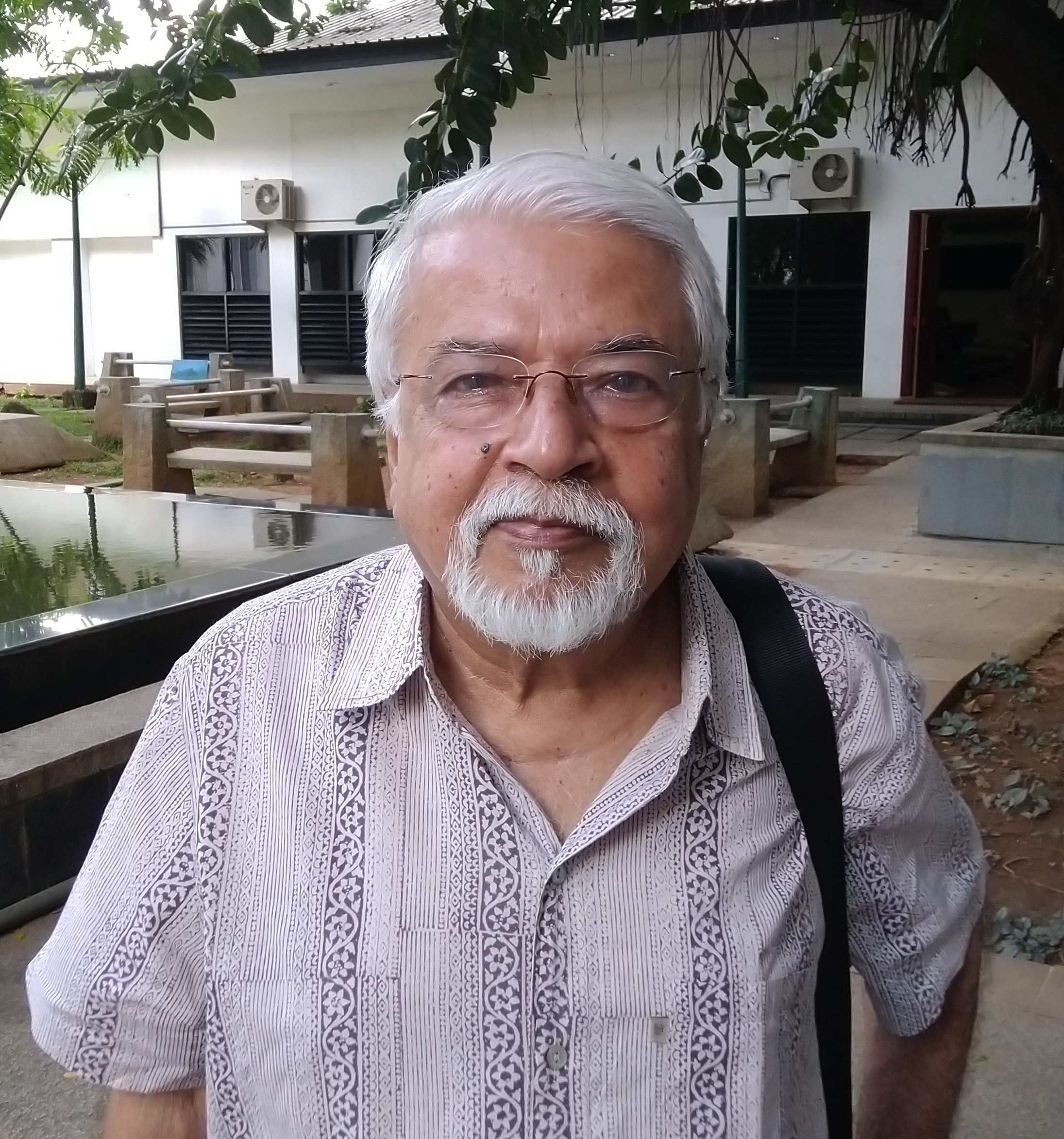
- S G Vasudev at Nation Gallery of modern art Bangalore
- Born: S. G. Vasudev; 1941 (age 84–85); Mysore, Kingdom of Mysore, British India (now Mysuru, Karnataka, India)
- Spouses: Arnawaz (d. 1988); Ammu Joseph (m. 1992)
- Parent(s): S.K. Gopal and Rathnamma
- Website: www.vasudevart.com

S. G. Vasudev (born 1941 is a founding member of the longtime Cholamandal Artists' Village where a basis was laid for the Madras Art Movement. Vasudev is one of the most prominent modernist painters in Karnataka and is known nationally and internationally for his use of line and color, working in media that include pencil drawings, oil paintings, silk tapestries, copper reliefs, and collages. The National Gallery of Modern Art, Bangalore presented a retrospective of his more than 50-year career of work, in September, 2018.

== Early life and education ==
Vasudev was born in 1941 in Mysuru, to S.K. Gopal and Rathnamma). He was encouraged to attend art school by art critic G. Venkatachalam. Vasudev left to attend the Government College of Fine Arts, Chennai (formerly known as the Madras School of Art).

While a student, Vasudev was awarded a National Scholarship from the Government of India in 1964. In 1967, he received a National Award from the All India Lalit Kala Academy.

At Chennai, Vasudev was strongly influenced by K. C. S. Paniker. Paniker encouraged students to study a variety of forms, from painting to batik and ceramics and founded the Cholamandal Artists’ Village in 1966, gathering together students of both art and crafts. Vasudev has said:

“My interest in craft developed from my time in Cholamandal Artists Village. I don’t draw a line between them ... The distinction mainly comes from the West. I think it’s very important for a contemporary artist in India to use contemporary crafts and craftsmen.”

== Work ==
Vasudev is founding member of the Cholamandal Artists' Village, where he lived and worked for twenty years, forming lifelong friendships with Girish Karnad and many others. The artists' commune was located in what was then a relatively rural area, near the sea with many tamarind and banyan trees. Vasudev was married there to the visual artist Arnawaz. He has described her as being both "my partner but also my in-house critic". Girish Karnad made a documentary about Arnawaz after her death in 1988.

Following the death of his first wife, Vasudev and his son returned to Bangalore to be closer to his family. There he married journalist Ammu Joseph in 1992 and continues to reside. His subsequent work reflects their life in the city and has become more socially engaged. He has described the culture there as more diverse in terms of people's politics, philosophy and experiences.

Vasudev is one of the most prominent painters in Karnataka and has been recognized for his drawings, paintings on canvas, reliefs in copper, and silk tapestries. He collaborates with master artists such as weaver K, Subbarayalu. During the COVID-19 pandemic, Vasudev began experimenting with collage, cartoons and caricatures.

His work is known for combining sometimes indistinct forms with sharp lines that outline them, and for his use of both colour and texture. He has compared his process of painting to the process of Ragam Tanam Pallavi in Carnatic music: starting with white pigment (Ragam), working with colours (Tanam), then removing colours to show the texture of the white (Pallavi).

Vasudev's work revisits a number of themes, including Vriksha (Tree of Life, 1960s-onwards), his Maithuna series (Act of Love, the union of female and male principles, 1980s), Tree of Life & Death (1990s), Rhapsody and his Theatre of Life series. He incorporates many natural elements, including birds, animals and humans. His works from the 1990s have reflected concerns about environment degradation. Vasudev was quoted on his art works in an interview:

"As you know, there are a few distinct and recurring themes in my works. One of them is “Vriksha” or the Tree of Life. I in fact unknowingly discovered this theme. I was initially fascinated with the tree and painted many pictures with the tree juxtaposed with other elements. Gradually the tree moved to the center of the stage and started absorbing various elements and forms; just like the gigantic banyan tree which is so amorphous and protective.

Later I explored the essence and nature of a man-woman relationship through contrasting forms and colors. The theme of Maithuna stands for the union between the female and the male principles – the prakriti and the purusha – that exist in nature, almost in a yin-yang fusion of being. Later on, I made a series of paintings and called it – “Humanscapes”, “Earthscapes”, and “Theatre of Life.""

Vasudev has broad interests in theatre, music, dance, literature and poetry. He has been active in a many artistic areas. He has been inspired by the poetry of D. R. Bendre; designed masks for a theatre production of Hayavadana for Girish Karnad; designed sets for B. V. Karanth; worked as art director on the film adaption of U. R. Ananthamurthy’s novel Samskara; and done drawings and cover designs for the books of A. K. Ramanujan.

His art shows in many parts of the world and his works are in collections at various galleries. He has won many awards in India and abroad, including the state's Varnashilpi Venkatappa award. In the city of Bangalore, the works of Vasudev have been exhibited at top Indian galleries such as Sumukha, Galerie De'Arts, Bangalore International Centre (BCI) and more. Vasudev's great interest in A.K.Ramanjuan's poetry was reflected in his drawings which was curated by Art Curator Deepa Subramanian in shows "Poetry in Colours" and "Tribute to Ramanujan"

Vasudev promotes the practice and enjoyment of art through initiatives such as Arnawaz Vasudev Charities (a non-profit providing financial assistance to young artists); Ananya Drishya (presenting artists and their works through lectures, discussions and outreach programmes); monthly outdoor Art Parks where artists work and meet the public; and public art (murals at the theatre Ranga Shankara).

The National Gallery of Modern Art, Bangalore held a retrospective exhibition spanning over fifty years of Vasudev's works in September, 2018. Entitled Inner Resonance—A Return to Sama, the show was curated by Sadanand Menon. The show covered five floors of the national gallery, including over 300 works in different media. Vasudev's body of work, from over 50 years as a contemporary modernist, blurs distinctions between art and craft. The retrospective travelled to Mumbai, Bengaluru, and Chennai.
