= Astrid Preston =

Swedish-American artist (born 1945)

- Born: 1945 (age 80–81); Stockholm, Sweden
- Education: University of California, Los Angeles (1967)
- Occupations: Artist; painter
- Awards: National Endowment for the Arts Fellowship Grant in Painting (1987), Lux Art Institute artist residency (2008)
- Website: Official website

Astrid Preston (born 1945, Stockholm, Sweden.) is a Latvian-American artist, specializing in painting and drawing.

== Education ==
She received a B.A. in English Literature from University of California, Los Angeles in 1967.

== Career ==
Preston has had solo exhibitions at the Laguna Art Museum, Saginaw Art Museum, Wichita Falls Museum, Ella Sharp Museum and Arts College International. Articles and reviews of her works have appeared in Los Angeles Times, Forbes, Art in America and Artforum.

Her works are in the permanent collection of Laguna Art Museum, Bakersfield Museum of Art, Los Angeles County Museum of Art, Orange County Museum of Art, Long Beach Museum of Art, Hammer Museum, McNay Art Museum, Oakland Museum of California and Nevada Museum of Art. Her archives are at the Archives of American Art, Smithsonian Institution.

Preston has been featured on the Bakersfield Museum of Art podcast "On the Edge: Artist Symposium-California Ethos: Conceptualism and Literalism" with Artists; Don Bachardy, Gregory Wiley Edwards and Allen Ruppersberg. Preston received an NEA Fellowship Grant in Painting in 1987 and an artist residency from Lux Art Institute in 2008.

== Exhibitions ==
=== Craig Krull Gallery ===
- Paintings (2002)
- Paintings (2003)
- Leaves (2004)
- Paintings (2006)
- Paintings (2008)
- Birdwatching (2009)
- For The Trees (2023)
- Between Worlds (2021)
- New Paintings (2019)
- Upside Down World (2017)
- On Reflections (2015)
- New Territory

=== R.B. Stevenson Gallery ===
- Echoing Light (2018)
- Into Nature (2016)
- Coming to the Edge
- east west spring fall (2010)

=== Bakersfield Museum of Art ===
- Poetics of Nature

=== Others ===
- Astrid Preston solo exhibition, (2013, S.C.A.P.E., Corona del Mar, CA)
- Summer in Bloom: A floral interpretation ( 2025, Galerie De'Arts, Santa Monica curated by Deepa Subramanian, Founder & Creative Head, Galerie De'Arts, Santa Monica
- Astrid Preston: Small Forest (2012, Santa Monica Museum of Art)
- Paintings & Drawings (2010, The Colburn School, Los Angeles)
- New Paintings (2008, AndrewShire Gallery, Singapore)
- Dreamscapes (2004, Baxter Chang Patri, San Francisco)
- Being in Place (2003, Wichita Falls Museum & Art Center)
- Landscapes of the Mind (2002, Cando Art Center)
- Astrid Preston: small paintings (2002, Lisa Coscino Gallery)
- Landscapes of the Mind (2001, The Arts Center, Jamestown; Dickinson State University Gallery; Northwest Art Center, Minot State University, Minot; Bismarck State College Gallery, Bismarck)
- Astrid Preston, Peter Blake Gallery, Laguna Beach, CA

==== 2000 ====
- Landscapes: A State of Mind, MSC Forsyth Center Galleries, Texas A & M University, College Station
- Paintings, Craig Krull Gallery, Santa Monica
- Paintings, Peter Blake Gallery, Laguna Beach

==== 1999 ====
- Paintings, Craig Krull Gallery, Santa Monica
- Recent Landscapes, St. Matthews Parish School, Pacific Palisades
- In Perspective, Arts College International, San Diego

==== 1998 ====
- Paintings, Peter Blake Gallery, Laguna Beach
- Ella Sharp Museum, Jackson, MI (2 person)
- Landscapes, Saginaw Art Museum, Saginaw

==== 1997 ====
- Paintings, Peter Blake Gallery, Laguna Beach

==== 1994 ====
- Astrid Preston, Peter Blake Gallery, Laguna Beach

==== 1991 ====
- New Paintings, Jan Turner Gallery, Los Angeles

==== 1989 ====
- New Paintings, Jan Turner Gallery, Los Angeles

==== 1987 ====
- Near Paradise, Laguna Art Museum
- New Paintings and Drawings, Patty Aande Gallery, San Diego
- Recent Paintings and Drawings, Krygier/Landau Contemporary Art, Los Angeles

==== 1986 ====
- Night Paintings, Patty Aande Gallery, San Diego

==== 1985 ====
- New Paintings and Drawings, Newspace, Los Angeles
- New Paintings and Drawings, Patty Aande Gallery, San Diego

==== 1984 ====
- New Paintings and Drawings, Newspace, Los Angeles, CA

==== 1983 ====
- New Paintings and Drawings, Newspace, Los Angeles

==== 1982 ====
- City of Angels, Los Angeles Institute of Contemporary Art, Los Angeles

==== 1981 ====
Landscapes, Newspace, Los Angeles

==== 1979 ====
- Drawings, Newspace, Los Angeles

==== 1977 ====
- Drawings, Newspace, Los Angeles

==== 1976 ====
- Drawings, Newspace, Los Angeles

==== 1974 ====
- Recent Paintings and Drawings, Gallery 707, Los Angeles

=== Selected group exhibitions ===
==== 2023 ====
- The Flower Show, L.A. Louver Gallery, Venice
- Uncharted Terrain: Imagined Landscapes: Hilary Brace, David Edington, Astrid Preston, Vita Art Center, Ventura
- Surreal Women, Sullivan Goss American Gallery, Santa Barbara
- Color and Form, Tufenkian Fine Arts, Glendale

==== 2022 ====
- The Edge LA Art 1970-90s from the Joan and Jack Quinn Family Collection, Armenian Museum of America, Watertown
- Nocturnal Sun, S.C.A.P.E., Corona del Mar
- Multiple Insights, R.B. Stevenson Gallery, La Jolla

==== 2021 ====
- Seeing Things, R.B. Stevenson Gallery, La Jolla,
- The Edge LA Art 1970-90s from the Joan and Jack Quinn Family Collection, Bakersfield Museum of Art
- Sky Space Time Change, Laguna Art Museum
- Decade by Decade: Women Artists of California, Long Beach Museum of Art

==== 2020 ====
- that's what artists do, R.B. Stevenson Gallery, La Jolla
- Antidote to Noise: Four Voices, curated by Peter Frank, Castelli Art Space, Los Angeles

==== 2019 ====
- re•col•lec•tion, Vita Art Center, Ventura
- Mindshift, LAVA Projects, Alhambra
- Made in California, Robert and Frances Fullerton Museum of Art, CSUSB, San Bernardino
- 40 Years of Art at Michael's, The Gallery of Michael's, Santa Monica
- Untitled (house) The Diane and Browne Goodwin Collection, Illinois State Museum, Lockport
- Women on the Rise 2019, Vita Art Center, Ventura

==== 2018 ====
- Lazy Susan V: Human/Nature, LAVA Projects, Alhambra

==== 2017 ====
- The Nature of Jungles, William Rolland Gallery of Fine Art, California Lutheran University, Thousand Oaks

==== 2016 ====
- Et in Arcadia Ego, New Museum Los Gatos; Traveled to William Rolland Gallery, Cal Lutheran University, Thousand Oaks
- Measure, Gesture, Form: Modern and Contemporary Drawings from a Recent Gift, Portland Art Museum, Portland

==== 2015 ====
- Above Ground, R.B. Stevenson Gallery, La Jolla

==== 2014 ====
- Portraits of the Garden, Sturt Haaga Gallery at Descanso Gardens, La Canada Flintridge

==== 2013 ====
- A little snow..., Craig Krull Gallery, Santa Monica
- Outside: Selections from the Doug Simay Collection, Oceanside Museum of Art, Oceanside
- Joan Joan Joan! One Subject, Many Artists, John Wayne Airport

==== 2012 ====
- Contemporary Realism from the Permanent Collection, Weisman Museum, Pepperdine University, Malibu
- Breaking in Two: A Provocative Vision of Motherhood, Arena 1, Santa Monica

==== 2011 ====
- 5X5 an Invitational, Westmont Museum of Art, Santa Barbara, CA
- Speak for the Trees, House of Balsamic, Irvine
- Speak for the Trees, S.C.A.P.E., Corona del Mar
- Gallery Selections 2011, R.B. Stevenson Gallery, La Jolla, CA

==== 2010 ====
- Neither Model nor Muse: Women as Artists, McNay Art Museum, San Antonio
- Meeting New Works: Recent Acquisitions at LBMA, Long Beach Museum of Art
- Side by Side, The Colburn School, Los Angeles

==== 2008 ====
- Emphasis Santa Monica, curated by Bruria Finkel, Pete and Susan Barrett Art Gallery, S.M.
- Plein Air Past and Present, San Diego Museum of Art, San Diego

==== 2007 ====
- then + now: Women Artists of Southern California, curated by Bruria Finkel, Track 16 Gallery, Santa Monica
- Echoes: Women Inspired by Nature, curated by Betty Ann Brown & Linda Vallejo, Orange County Center for Contemporary Art, Santa Ana

==== 2006 ====
- Distinctive Artists of Southern California, LAX & Ontario Airports
- Art Healing, A. Preston & M. Merz, Tan Tock Seng Hospital, Singapore
- Good to Go, Newspace Gallery, Los Angeles, CA

==== 2005 ====
- Trains & Trees, Terrence Rogers Fine Art, Santa Monica, CA
- Blue, Baxter Chang Patri Fine Art, San Francisco, CA
- California Landscapes, Long Beach Museum of Art
- Santa Monica Originals, curated by Bruria Finkel, Arena 1, Santa Monica

==== 2004 ====
- New California Realism, Gallery C, Hermosa Beach
- Shakespeare as Muse, Schneider Museum of Art, Ashland

==== 2003 ====
- Omnivores, Michaels, Santa Monica

==== 2000 ====
- Landscape Not Forgotten, Wm D. Cannon Art Gallery, Carlsbad

==== 1998 ====
- Enduring Landscape, Bennett Galleries, Knoxville

==== 1997 ====
- Arte actual en Los Angeles, Sala de Exposiciones de la Excma, Cuenca, Spain
- Real, Is it?, Louis Stern Fine Arts, Los Angeles

==== 1996 ====
- City of Vapor, Tatistcheff/Rogers, Santa Monica
- Frequencies of Nature: Part II, K. T. Carter & Assoc., St. Leo, FL; Pasco-Hernando Comm. College, Dade City and New Port Richey, FL; Melvin Art Gallery, Florida Southern College, Lakeland, FL; South Florida Community College, Avon Park
- LA Current: The Full Spectrum, UCLA Hammer Museum of Art, Rental and Sales Gallery, Los Angeles
- Time Splits Open: 15 Narratives, Marcia Wood Gallery, Atlanta
- LA Current: The Female Perspective, UCLA Hammer Museum of Art, Rental and Sales Gallery, Los Angeles
- Paintings of the New Landscape, Peter Blake Gallery, Laguna Beach

==== 1995 ====
- Landscape: The Continuum, Los Angeles Municipal Art Gallery, Los Angeles

==== 1994 ====
- Holiday Group Show, Peter Blake Gallery, Laguna Beach
- Southern California: The Conceptual Landscape, Madison Arts Center, Madison
- A Sense of Place, The Sam Francis Gallery, Crossroads School for the Arts and Sciences, Santa Monica
- Greiger. Preston. Wudl, Jerrold Burchman Contemporary Art, Santa Barbara

==== 1992 ====
- The Landscape Revisited: Romantic Visions by Contemporary California Artists, Bakersfield Museum of Art

==== 1991 ====
- Personal Mythologies, Marc Richards Gallery, Santa Monica
- The Edge of Night, Muckenthaler Cultural Center, Fullerton
- The Spiritual Landscape, Biota Gallery, Los Angeles

==== 1990 ====
- Nightscapes, FHP Hippodrome Gallery, Long Beach

==== 1988 ====
- Landscape/Common Ground: A Continuity of Spirit, Jan Turner Gallery, Los Angeles
- Seoul Olympic Memorial, 1988 Int'l Continental Artists Exhibition, Printemps, Korea and Tong Art Museum, Korea
- The Cultivated Landscape, Riverside Art Museum, Riverside
- California Landscape Art: Plein Art to Present, Downey Museum of Art

==== 1987 ====
- Present Perspectives: 1975-1985, Fresno Art Center, Fresno

==== 1986 ====
- Southern California Monotypes: The Singular Image, Guggenheim Gallery, Chapman University
- Landscapes/Elements, Jan Baum Gallery, Los Angeles
- Landscape/Seascape/Cityscape, Contemporary Arts Center, New Orleans and New York Academy of Fine Arts

==== 1985 ====
- The Electric Cat, San Diego Natural History Museum
- Artists Look at Architecture, Transamerica Pyramid, San Francisco
- A Change of Art, Bank of Los Angeles, Los Angeles

==== 1984 ====
|American Landscape Painting, Fine Arts Gallery, California State University, Los Angeles

- Significant Others, Patty Aande Gallery, San Diego
- Los Angeles and the Palm Tree: Image of a City, ARCO Center for Visual Art, Los Angeles
- A Broad Spectrum: Contemporary LA Painters & Sculptors '84, Design Center of Los Angeles

==== 1983 ====
- Houses, University Art Gallery, California State University, Hayward
- The Los Angeles Postcard Project, Part I, Los Angeles Municipal Art Gallery, Los Angeles
- Attention California Artists, The Oakland Museum, Oakland

==== 1982 ====
- Permanent Collection, Newport Harbor Art Museum, Newport Beach
- The Magic Show, Santa Barbara Contemporary Arts Forum and Claremont Colleges, Claremont
- Drawings by Painters, Long Beach Museum of Art, Long Beach, CA; Mandeville Art Gallery, UCSD; and the Oakland Museum, Oakland

==== 1981 ====
- Locations, California State College, San Bernardino, CA
- Elegant Night, Security Pacific Bank, Los Angeles, CA
- Drawing: Personal Definitions, San Diego State University Art Gallery, San Diego, CA

==== 1980 ====
- Seven from Los Angeles (Aaron Berman Gallery, New York)
- Invitational Drawings and Watercolor Exhibition (Municipal Art Gallery, Los Angeles)
- Unstretched Surfaces (College of the Siskiyous Art Gallery)
- Contemporaries: 17 Artists (Security Pacific Bank, Los Angeles)
- Southern California Drawings (Joseloff Gallery, University of Hartford)

==== 1979 ====
- Drawings (University Art Gallery, Cal State University)
- Newspace in San Diego (San Diego State University Art Gallery, San Diego)

==== 1977 ====
- Shades of Gray: A Drawing Survey (Malone Art Gallery, Loyola Marymount University)
- Drawing: Various Approaches (Fine Arts Gallery, Long Beach City College)
- A Point of View-Recent Work by Four Los Angeles Artists (The Los Angeles Institute of Contemporary Art)
- 24 Southern California Women Artists (Cerritos College Art Gallery, Norwalk)

==== 1976, 1975, 1974 ====
- American Artists '76: A Celebration (1976, McNay Art Museum, San Antonio)
- Drawings (1975, Tortue Gallery, Santa Monica)
- Group Show (Broxton Gallery, Los Angeles)
- Annual Juried Show (1974, Palos Verdes Art Museum)

== Honors and recognition ==
Year	Award	Category	Ref
1987	National Endowment for the Arts	Fellowship Grant in Painting	
2008	Lux Art Institute	Artist residency	
1975	Los Angeles Municipal Art Gallery	Purchase award	
1983	Mural Competition Award	Children's Hospital Walls Competition, Los Angeles	
