= Canadian Power and Sail Squadrons =

Canadian Power and Sail Squadrons / Escadrille canadiennes de plaisance (CPS-ECP), operating under the brand CanBoat / NautiSavoir, is a non-profit Canadian organization of recreational boaters with about 26,000 members. CPS is headquartered in Toronto, Ontario. Its instructors train recreational boaters in boating safety knowledge as well as vessel handling and navigation skills. CPS offers boating safety courses yearly and provides qualification for the Pleasure Craft Operator Card (PCOC).

== History ==
Canadian Power Squadron was founded in Windsor, Ontario in 1938 after a group of boaters travelled to the Detroit Power Squadron to take the United States Power Squadrons Coastal Navigation Course. Upon their successful completion of the course, they formed the Windsor Power Squadron, closely followed by the formation of Squadrons in Sarnia, London and Toronto. CPS now has 166 Squadrons in all provinces and the Yukon Territory. CPS was incorporated in 1947, and in 1985 changed its name to Canadian Power and Sail Squadrons. At that time, the French name, Escadrilles canadiennes de plaisance was formally adopted.

== Membership ==
Over 26,000 members volunteer their time for CPS to help promote the Boating and Pleasure Craft Operator Card (PCOC) courses to the general public, and providing various services for the membership. Most of the volunteers are involved in boat training, developing and writing courses and instructing in classrooms across Canada.

One who successfully completes either the CPS Boating Course (called Piloting until 1972) or the CPS PCOC Course becomes a member of the organization. Full members are then permitted to fly the CPS flag on their vessels and receive six issues of Canadian Yachting magazine, four of which contain the member publication, The Port Hole. In Quebec, members receive four issues of L'Escale Nautique magazine, which contain the French member publication, Le Hublot. The members also have the opportunity to take a number of advanced and elective courses. Throughout the years a number of member benefits have been developed, including the ability to purchase a CPS Members Insurance policy, which offers a discount based on the courses members have taken.

== Courses ==
All CPS courses are theoretical (classroom-based), and are typically offered in the evenings at local high schools, libraries and community centers.

Along with the CPS Boating Course and the CPS PCOC Course, there are a number of elective courses, which are open to both members and the public. These include topics such as Fundamentals of Weather, Global Weather, Marine Maintenance, Distress Signaling, Extended Cruising, Maritime Radio, and Seamanship Sail. There are also a number of electronic courses including, Finding Your Way With GPS, Navigating with GPS, Electronic Charting, Radar for Pleasure Craft, and Depth Sounder. CPS is constantly updating and developing courses for recreational boaters throughout Canada.

CPS manages the Restricted Operator Certificates (Maritime) (i.e. Marine Radio Operator's Course, Non-Commercial) on behalf of Industry Canada.

Advanced courses offered by CPS include Seamanship (formerly called Piloting), which prepares boaters for travel on Canada's great lakes. Advance Piloting delves into subjects that include more information on tides and currents to prepare boaters for ocean travel. There is also a Celestial Navigation Course for instruction in navigating by the stars. For the volunteers who serve the organization, CPS offers Officer Training and Instructor Development programs. Many of the courses offered by CPS enhance members' expertise in their private lives as well.

== Organization ==
CPS offers its members volunteer opportunities such as instructing classes or taking a position on the Squadron Executive Committee. Members can also volunteer at the District and National level by serving on committees responsible for training, public relations, marine reporting, environmental issues, publications, communications, conferences and meetings, development of Port Captains, membership, and other areas.

CPS holds a National Conference, rotating to a different region in Canada each year, at which it recognizes its partners and offers seminars on new developments.
