= Butterfly (dinghy) =

Sailing dinghy

Development
- Designer: John Barnett
- Location: Libertyville, Illinois
- Year: 1961
- Design: Scow
- Name: Butterfly

Boat
- Crew: 1-2
- Draft: .660 m (2 ft 2.0 in)

Hull
- Type: Monohull
- Hull weight: 61 kg (134 lb)
- LOA: 3.632 m (11 ft 11.0 in)
- Beam: 1.372 m (4 ft 6.0 in)

Rig
- Mast height: 5.486 m (18 ft 0 in)

Sails
- Mainsail area: 6.967 m^{2} (74.99 sq ft)

Racing
- D-PN: 108.3

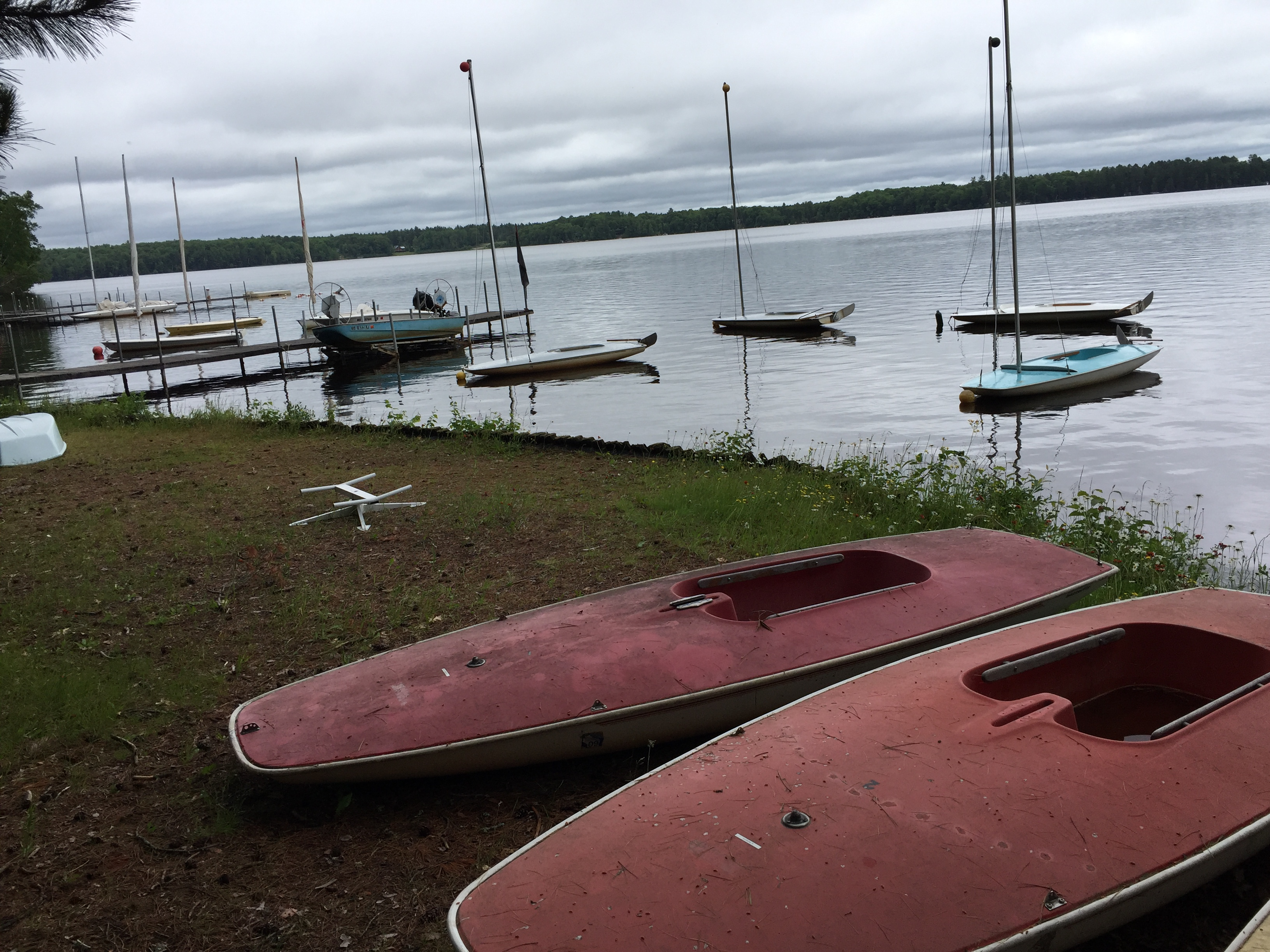
Camp Manito-wish YMCA sailors have been sailing the Camp's fleet of Butterly sailboats since 1979.

The Butterfly is a one-design sailing dinghy, originally designed for a crew of two, but now most commonly raced single-handed. It was designed in 1961 in Libertyville, Illinois by John Barnett. The 12-foot (3.7 m) hull is a scow design. The craft has a stayed 18-foot (5.5 m) mast set as a Marconi rig with a single mainsail with a 75-square-foot (7.0 m^{2}) surface area. The cockpit is 15 ½" deep, exceptionally deep for this size of sailboat, and can accommodate an adult up to 6 feet in height.

== History ==
The boat was first designed by John Barnett of Libertyville, Illinois in 1961, who was inspired to make a smaller version of the C Scow, a popular sailing skiff. With the help of Dr. Robert Chamberlain, Mike Daskilakis, and Jim Miller the class was officially launched in 1962. The first Butterfly nationals was held at Grand Rapids Yacht Club in 1962, after which the boat was declared the official training boat of the Western Michigan Yachting Association. Barnett quickly moved production to Kenosha, Wisconsin where it stayed until he sold the company in 1982 to Hedlund Marine in Willmette, Illinois, but production was kept in Wisconsin. In 2007, Hedlund Marine sold production to Windward Boatworks of Princeton, Wisconsin.

== Fleets ==
- Crystal Lake Yacht Club
- Glen Lake Yacht Club
- Grand Rapids Yacht Club
- Leland Yacht Club
- Long Lake Yacht Club
- Missouri Yacht Club
- Muskegon Yacht Club
- Powers Lake Yacht Club
- Sail Dubay
- Camp Michigania Yacht Club
- Spring Lake Yacht Club
- Torch Lake Yacht Club
- Union Sailing Club
- White Lake Yacht Club
- White Rock Boat Club

== Sources ==
- National Butterfly Association: boat specifications and class history
