= National Maritime Historical Society =

The National Maritime Historical Society (NMHS) is a non-profit organization in America devoted to historical ship preservation and maritime education.

The society's mission is to educate Americans, especially its youth about maritime accomplishments throughout American history and their continued relevance for national prosperity and cultural vitality. Specifically, the NMHS educational agenda includes exploring America's maritime heritage, advocating first-hand experiences on ships, and encouraging visits to maritime museums. An active participant among maritime institutions, NMHS is a sponsor of the Maritime Heritage Conferences and serves as a member of the Council of American Maritime Museums; It was instrumental in establishing the American Society of Marine Artists, The American Ship Trust and the National Maritime Alliance.

Since 1972, the NMHS has published a quarterly magazine, Sea History featuring articles on contemporary and historic marine art; Historic Ships on Lee Shore, which brings attention to historic ships in need, a Sea History for Kids section (profiling marine and maritime professionals) and Animals in Sea History by Richard J. King. Since 2004, the magazine has also included a regular column by Peter McCracken (founder of Serials Solutions and ShipIndex.org), called 'Maritime History on the Internet.'

The NMHS holds two annual gala awards dinners, and gives their Distinguished Service Award to important people in the maritime field. One of the dinners is in Washington DC. From 2018 it has been held at the Mayflower Hotel. In former years it took place at the National Press Club. The other annual awards dinner is held at the New York Yacht Club in Manhattan.

== NMHS Awards ==
The NMHS gives out a number of awards including the:

- American Ship Trust Award (awarded since 1968)
- Founder's Sheet Anchor Award (David A. O'Neil Sheet Anchor Award) (est. 1988)
- James Monroe Award/Robert G. Albion-James Monroe Award
- NMHS Distinguished Service Award (est. 1993)
- NMHS Bravo Zulu Award
- Walter Cronkite Award for Excellence in Maritime Education
- Sea History Magazine Awards
  - NMHS Sea History Award of Appreciation
  - Rodney N. Houghton Award
- Volunteering Awards
  - Service Appreciation Award
  - Volunteer Appreciation Award
- NMHS New York Harbor Historic Ship Steward Award of Excellence
- Joyce S. Hayward Award for Historic Interpretation
- C. Patrick Labadie Award for Historic Preservation
- Henry N. Barkhausen Award for Original Research in Great Lakes Maritime History (Formerly the Association Award)
- The President’s Award
- Other Organization Awards (presented through partnerships)
  - Nautical Research Guild - Maritime Research & Modeling Award
  - National Coast Guard Museum Association - Alexander Hamilton Award
  - Naval Historical Foundation - Distinguished Service Award

=== American Ship Trust Award ===
The American Ship Trust Award has been awarded since 1968. The award was renamed to the Karl Kortum American Ship Trust Award in 1997, to honor Karl Kortum, one of the founders of the National Maritime Historical Society.

=== Founder's Sheet Award ===
The Founder's Sheet Award, established in 1988, is given in recognition of the "extraordinary leadership in building the strength and outreach of the NMHS." The award originally given to honor the NMHS founders and was renamed to the David A. O'Neil Sheet Anchor Award to honor David A. O'Neil, a long-time NMHS trustee and overseer.

=== James Monroe Award/Robert G. Albion-James Monroe Award ===
The James Monroe Award/Robert G. Albion-James Monroe Award is given to honor maritime historians, deep-water mariners, preservationists, authors, artists, and educators. South Street Seaport Museum originally established the James Monroe Award in 1968 and presented it until 1972. The NMHS started presenting the award in 1973. In 1993, the award was renamed to recognize the role of Robert Albion, a renowned maritime historiographer.

=== Distinguished Service Award ===
The NMHS has awarded a Distinguished Service Award since 1993.

=== Bravo Zulu Award ===
The Bravo Zulu Award is given to recognize "heroic and inspirational performance in the tradition of the maritime services."

=== Walter Cronkite Award for Excellence in Maritime Education ===
The Walter Cronkite Award for Excellence in Maritime Education was established in 1995 to honor the "outstanding educational programs that foster greater awareness of our maritime heritage." The award is named after the broadcaster, Walter Cronkite, who served as chair of the Maritime Education Initiative and was a long-time NMHS overseer.

=== Sea History Magazine awards ===
The NMHS Sea History Award of Appreciation is given to individuals who "regularly contribute exemplary features that have become a mainstay in Sea History magazine."

The Rodney N. Houghton Award is presented for the best feature article in Sea History Magazine for the previous year. The award is named after Rodney Houghton, an NMHS trustee and advocate for advancing maritime history education.

=== Volunteering Awards ===
The Service Appreciation Award is presented in gratitude to recognize the extraordinary effort and selfless service of those who volunteer their time and expertise for the advancement of the NMHS.

The Volunteer Appreciation Award was established in 1996 to honor the enduring dedication of the NMHS volunteers.

== Publications ==
- International Journal of Naval History
- Sea History Magazine
