= Ammu Joseph =

Indian journalist (b. 1953)

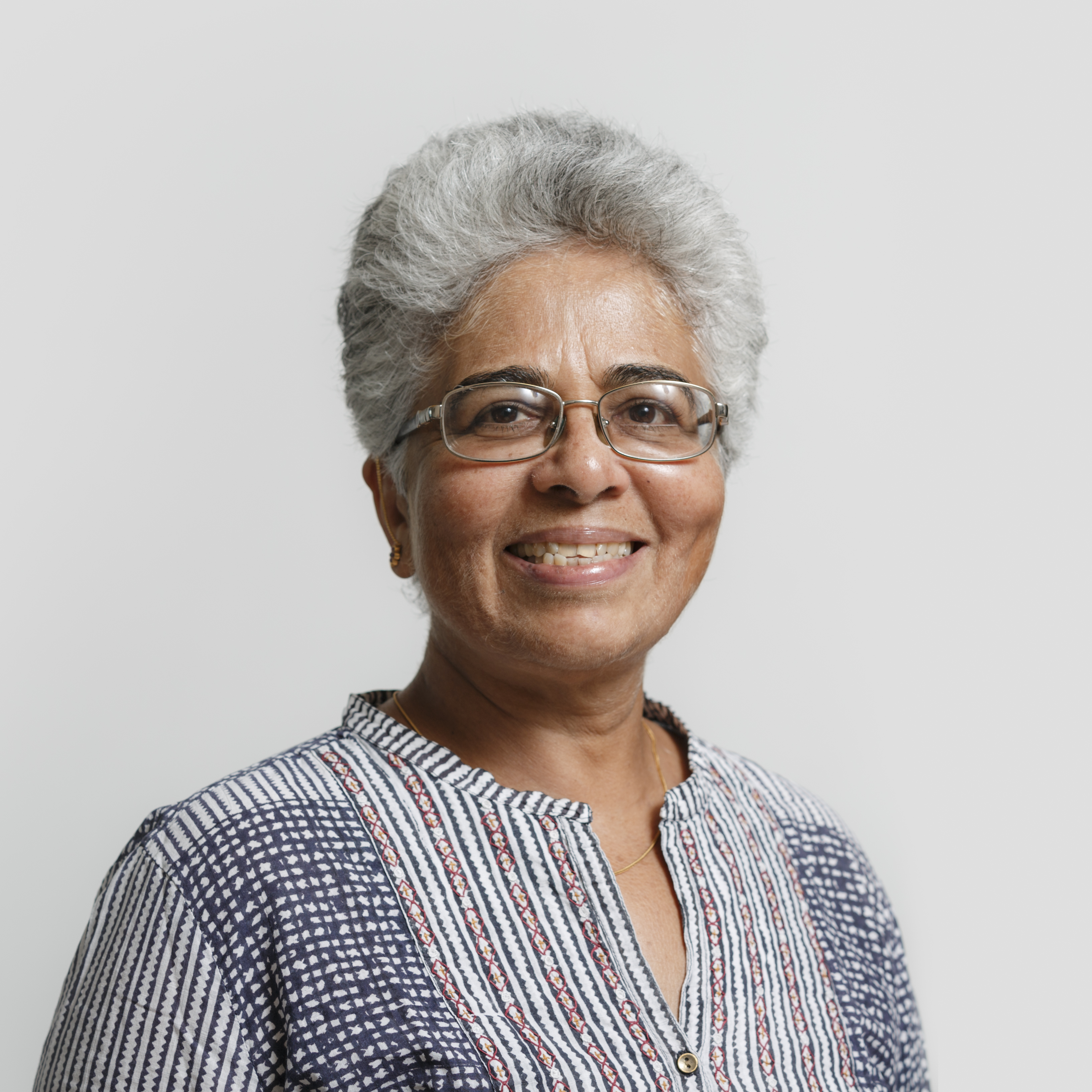
- Born: 26 September 1953 (age 72); Alwaye, Kerala, India
- Education: Women's Christian College, Chennai (B.A., Eng Lit, 1974); Sophia College Polytechnic (PG Diploma, Social Communications Media, 1975); Syracuse University (B.S., Public Communications, 1976)
- Years active: 1975–present
- Employer: Self-employed/Independent journalist
- Known for: Journalist, gender issues, media
- Spouse: S. G. Vasudev
- Awards: Donna Allen Award for Feminist Advocacy from the AEJMC, USA (2003), UNFPA-LAADLI Media Award for Gender Sensitivity (2007)

External videos
- "What's Your Ism? Ammu Joseph on pioneering feminist journalism in India", The News Minute, 15 Jan 2025.

Ammu Joseph (born 26 September 1953) is an Indian journalist, author, media analyst and editorial consultant based in Bengaluru. Joseph writes primarily on issues relating to gender, media and culture. As a feminist journalist she examines both the coverage of women by media and the experiences of women working in media.

Joseph has authored multiple books and UNESCO reports, in addition to writing for both mainstream and web-based media. She has received national and international awards for her feminist advocacy and work on gender sensitivity.

== Education ==
Joseph received her B.A. in English literature from Women's Christian College, Chennai in 1974, a diploma in Social Communications Media from Sophia College Polytechnic in Mumbai in 1975, and a B.S. in Public Communications from Syracuse University, New York, U.S. in 1976. During her studies in the United States, she was inspired by meeting Gloria Steinem, Suzanne Braun Levine and Patricia Carbine, the founders of Ms. magazine. Joseph has also been a press fellow at Wolfson College, Cambridge University, England.

== Career ==
Joseph began her career as a journalist in Mumbai with a mainstream women's magazine, Eve's Weekly, which she served as Assistant Editor for four years (1977–81). She later worked with Update (a business magazine) and Woman Today (a women's magazine that Aroon Purie of India Today planned to launch but did not). She was a full-time Magazine Editor at The Indian Post in Mumbai until 1986, editing the Sunday magazine of the daily newspaper. In 1988 she decided to move to Bangalore and continue her work as a freelance/independent journalist and writer.

In 1994, Ammu Joseph and Kalpana Sharma published Whose news? the media and women's issues, examining the coverage of women in media as it related to high-profile issues such as tests for sex determination, rape, dowry deaths, sati, and the rights of Muslim divorcees to maintenance. This work highlighted the extent to which news media focused primarily on violent atrocities against women, rather than addressing their work, health concerns, or position in society. Women were often doubly victimized by their treatment in the media. Joseph also notes that sensational stories tend to selectively show 'people like us' as victims, and 'others' as perpetrators. In later work Joseph has continued to foreground ways in which media coverage sensationalizes or ignores women. For example, coverage of disasters such as tsunamis tends to focus on the experience of men and to ignore the ways in which women are affected, which can lead to policy discrimination in terms of material aid and health care.

In the book Women in Journalism: Making News (2000) Joseph documented the experiences of 200 Indian women journalists, including language issues, sexual harassment, and unequal pay. She organized regional workshops in 2000 and 2001, leading to the foundation of the Network of Women in Media, India (NWMI) in 2002. Joseph was a co-editor of the NWMI website.

Joseph served as Regional Coordinator for South Asia for the International Women's Media Foundation's Global Report on the Status of Women in the News Media (2011). Joseph has worked closely with UNESCO, serving as Coordinator for India for the Global Media Monitoring Project (2010 and 2015), the longest longitudinal research initiative on gender in news media. She was among the principal drafters of UNESCO's Gender Sensitive Indicators for Media (2012).

Joseph played a key role in the pioneering project that led to the 2020 report on the situation of women working in the film industries of southern India, Shift Focus: Women Shaping the Narrative in Media and Entertainment. Joseph is a co-author of the resulting report, Shift Focus: Women Shaping the Narrative in Media and Entertainment (2020).

Joseph was an editorial consultant with the Concerned for Working Children, Bangalore, helping to launch a wallpaper for street and working children, among other publications. She was also editorial consultant for Voices for Change, a quarterly publication of Voices/Madhyam Communications, a Bangalore-based NGO focusing on communications in and for development. She served on the board of Oxfam India, a not-for-profit organization registered in India, for nine years, up to 2020.

Joseph has taught journalism at several institutions of media education. She was on the visiting faculty of the Sophia College Polytechnic, Mumbai (1981–85) and the Asian College of Journalism, Chennai/Madras (2000–2003), and has been invited to deliver guest lectures at other journalism schools.

== Written works ==
Joseph has published the following books:

- Joseph, Ammu; Sharma, Kalpana, eds. (1994). Whose news? the media and women's issues. New Delhi London: Sage. ISBN 9788170363804.
- Joseph, Ammu (2000). Women in journalism: making news. Delhi: Konark. ISBN 9788122005639.
- Joseph, Ammu, ed. (2003). Storylines, conversations with women writers. Women's World; Asmita Resource Centre for Women.
- Joseph, Ammu; Sharma, Kalpana, eds. (2003). Terror, counter-terror: women speak out. London: Zed Books. ISBN 978-1842773536.
- Joseph, Ammu, ed. (2004). Just between us: women speak about their writing. New Delhi: Women's World, India; Asmita; Women Unlimited. ISBN 978-81-88965-15-1.
- Joseph, Ammu, ed. (2010). Interior decoration: poems by 54 women from 10 languages. New Delhi: Women Unlimited [u.a.] ISBN 9788188965625.
- Joseph, Ammu; Paul, Bina; Shervani, Asiya; Mahmood, Putul; Sukumar, Mini (2020). Shift Focus: Women Shaping the Narrative in Media and Entertainment (PDF). Women in Cinema Collective (WCC) & Sakhi Women's Resource Centre.

Joseph co-authored UNESCO's preliminary report Towards Media and Information Literacy Indicators (2011), and was a major contributor in drafting UNESCO's Gender Sensitive Indicators for Media (2012). She was India's regional report author for Inside the news: challenges and aspirations of women journalists in Asia and the Pacific (UNESCO, 2015). She served on the Advisory Group for World trends of freedom of expression and media development (UNESCO, 2014). Joseph has contributed chapters to the UNESCO reports Media and Gender: A Scholarly Agenda for a Global Alliance (UNESCO/IAMCR, 2014) and Re|shaping Cultural Policies (UNESCO, 2015, 2018).

She has contributed chapters to The Palgrave International Handbook of Women and Journalism (Palgrave Macmillan, 2013); the Learning Resource Kit for Gender-Ethical Journalism and Media House Policy (WACC, 2012); Missing Half the Story: Journalism as if Gender Matters (Zubaan, 2010); Fleeing People of South Asia (2009); 21st Century Journalism in India (2007); and Tsunami communication (2004).

Joseph has contributed to many mainstream publications and web-based media, including Citizen Matters, Deccan Herald Economic & Political Weekly India Together, Money Control, Nieman Reports, The Citizen, and The Hoot. Under the pseudonym "Uma", she wrote the fortnightly "Spaced Out" column for children on current affairs and social issues in The Hindu's Young World from 1990 to 1998.

== Awards ==
Joseph was awarded the Donna Allen Award for Feminist Advocacy by the Commission on the Status of Women of the Association for Education in Journalism and Mass Communication, USA, in 2003. In 2007, Joseph received the UNFPA-LAADLI Media Award for Gender Sensitivity in recognition of her consistent engagement with gender issues.

== Selected book chapters ==
- — (2014). "Action, reaction, introspection, rectification". Media and gender: a scholarly agenda for the Global Alliance on Media and Gender. UNESCO. pp. 74–78. ISBN 9789231000300.
- — (2015). "Women as creators: gender equality". Re|shaping cultural policies: a decade promoting the diversity of cultural expressions for development. UNESCO. pp. 173–188. ISBN 978-92-3-100136-9.
- — (2017). "Gender equality: missing in action". Re|shaping cultural policies: advancing creativity for development, 2005 Convention global report, 2018. UNESCO. pp. 189–207. ISBN 978-92-3-100256-4.

== Selected articles ==
- — (7 July 2008). "Feminism Remixed: An Article by Ammu Joseph". Ultra Violet. Republished from VERVE magazine, Volume 16, Issue 6, June 2008.
- — (11 December 2013). "Felt need". Frontline.
- — (8 March 2014). "Essay | Reporting rape". Live Mint.
- — (18 January 2017). "Molestation in Bangalore--how many is 'mass' ?". The Hoot.
- — (5 July 2014). "India Together: In search of the missing link". India Today.
- — (18 April 2019). "Because it's 2019: time for more women in legislature". Deccan Herald.
- — (5 July 2020). "Skeletons in Media Cupboards". The Citizen.
- — (25 September 2020). "Media Regulation is not Censorship". The Citizen.
- — (2021). "The Curious Case of Women in Media" (PDF). South Asia Chronicle (11): 105–119.
- — (4 July 2022). "The Media Circus: Where's the Ringmaster?". The Citizen.
- — (24 August 2024). "The magic of cinema hides deep-rooted gender injustice". Mint.
