= Chapman High School =

Chapman High School may refer to:

- Chapman High School (Kansas)
- Chapman High School (Inman, South Carolina)
