= Network of Women in Media, India =

Independent collective of women media professionals in India

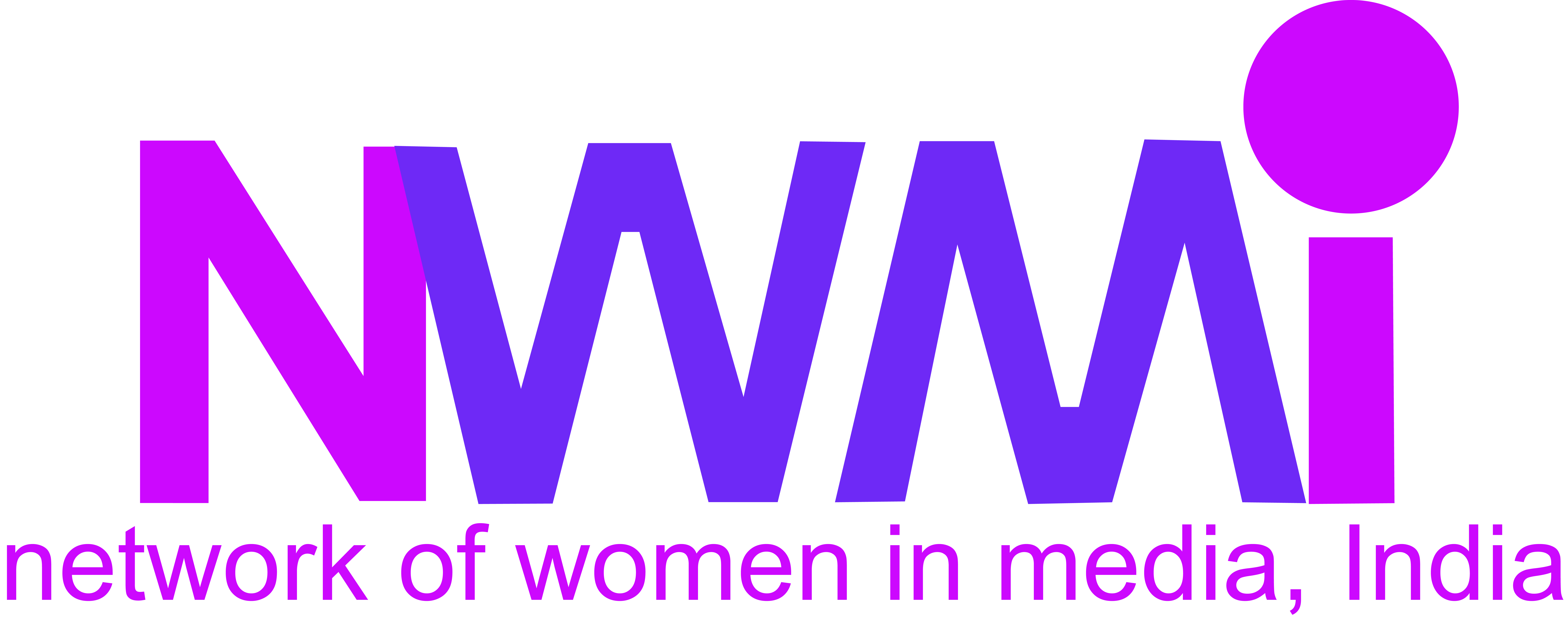
NWMI logo

The Network of Women in Media, India (NWMI) is an independent, informal collective of women media professionals across India. Founded in January 2002, the network functions as a forum for women journalists to share resources, promote media ethics, advocate for journalists' rights, and advance gender equality within the media industry and broader society.

As of 2026, the organization operates as a decentralized, non-hierarchical entity with no centralized secretariat, paid staff, or formal funding structures, relying entirely on the voluntary participation of its estimated 950 members.

== History ==
The establishment of the NWMI developed through a participatory process building on localized initiatives by women journalists in different regions of India. Between 2000 and 2002, three regional workshops were organized to gauge interest in a nationwide collective:

- Bangalore (November 2000)
- Jaipur (March 2001)
- Shillong (September 2001)

These regional meetings prompted the creation of several local media networks, including a state-level association in Bihar. In January 2002, a national meeting was convened in Delhi, bringing together over 100 media professionals from 16 Indian states. The participants collectively conceptualized the framework of the organization, leading to the formal launch of the NWMI on 30 January 2002.

== Structure and Objectives ==
NWMI maintains an informal organizational structure without elected office-bearers or central funds. The collective's stated goals encompass both professional advancement and societal media monitoring.

At the local and national levels, the network functions to facilitate career advancement for women in journalism through peer mentoring, skill sharing, and professional networking. The collective provides particular solidarity to independent freelance journalists navigating contract negotiations and payment disputes with media outlets.

== Advocacy and Initiatives ==
The network routinely issues public statements concerning media ethics, press freedom, and the labor rights of journalists. It frequently acts in support of journalists facing legal actions, harassment, or physical threats in the course of their professional duties.

=== Anti-Sexual Harassment Work ===
Following the widespread public disclosures of sexual harassment within Indian media houses (associated with the global #MeToo movement), the NWMI expanded its focus on workplace safety and legal literacy.

On International Women’s Day in 2020, the NWMI, in collaboration with the organization Gender At Work, released a comprehensive research report titled Creating Safe Workplaces: Prevention and Redressal of Sexual Harassment in Media Houses in India.

In 2021, the network established a specialized digital resource repository on its official website tracking relevant Indian labor legislation, anti-sexual harassment compliance data, and legal FAQs for media workers.

== Awards and Recognition ==
The collective received the Laadli Gender Champion Award, an honor presented by the non-profit organization Population First. The award recognized the network's ongoing initiatives to foster workplace solidarity among female journalists and promote gender-sensitive reporting practices across mainstream media. This specific iteration of the award was instituted in memory of feminists and social activists Kamla Bhasin, Gail Omvedt, and Sonal Shukla, all of whom passed away in 2021.

== See also ==
- Journalism in India
- Media of India
- MeToo movement in India
