= BoatUS =

American association of boat owners

- Type: Association
- Founded: 1966; 60 years ago
- Founder: Richard Schwartz
- Headquarters: Springfield, Virginia, United States
- Owner: Berkshire Hathaway
- Parent: GEICO
- Website: boatus.com (Association) boatus.org (501c3 Charitable Organization)

Boat Owners Association of The United States, better known as BoatUS, is an American association of boat owners with more than 800,000 dues-paying members offering various services supporting TowBoatUS on water recreational boat towing as well as roadside boat trailer towing activities. Additional services are boat insurance BoatUS Magazine subscription, discounts on boating-related products and services, and lobbying organization on behalf of boat owners. The organization is based in Springfield, Virginia, and promotes itself as “The Nation’s Largest Advocacy, Services and Safety Group for recreational boat owners” and "The Boat Owners Auto Club" for its similarities to AAA.

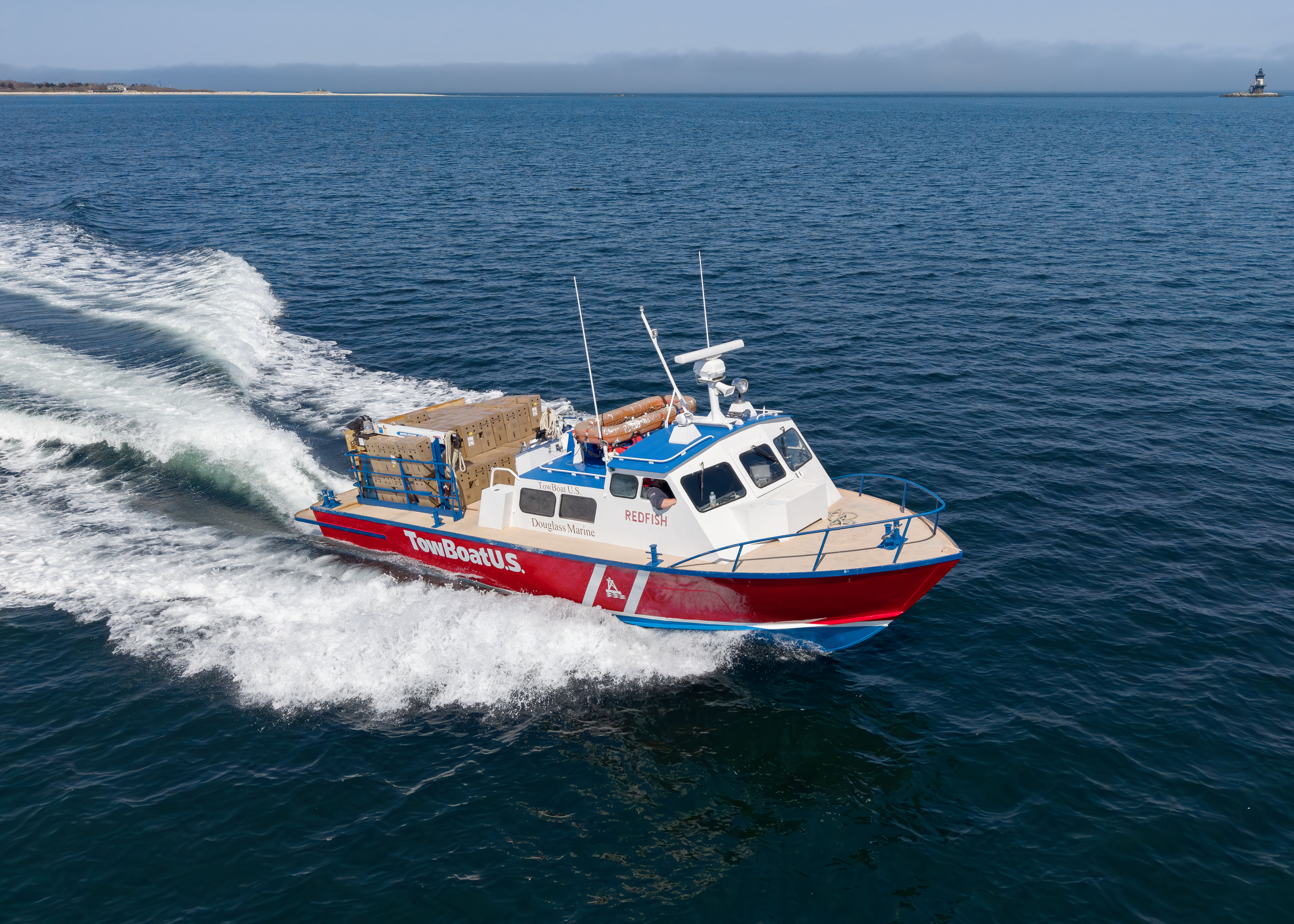
A TowBoatUS response vessel transporting cargo to Plum Island, NY

BoatUS also gave rise to the organization that would be eventually called the BoatUS Foundation for Boating Safety and Clean Water, a 501(c)(3) charitable organization that promotes safe boating including a state-level boating safety course and environmentally responsible boating practices.

== See also ==
- West Marine
- AAA
