= Antarctic Micronational Union =

Intermicronational organization

- Founded: 6 December 2008
- Type: Intermicronational organization
- Leader: Yaroslav Mar
- Staff: 9 member states (2025)
- Website: amu.ac

The Antarctic Micronational Union (AMU) is an intermicronational organization of self imaginative self proclaimed nations that aims to regulate micronational claims in Antarctica. The purpose of the AMU is to protect the claims of its members against other claimants.

== History ==
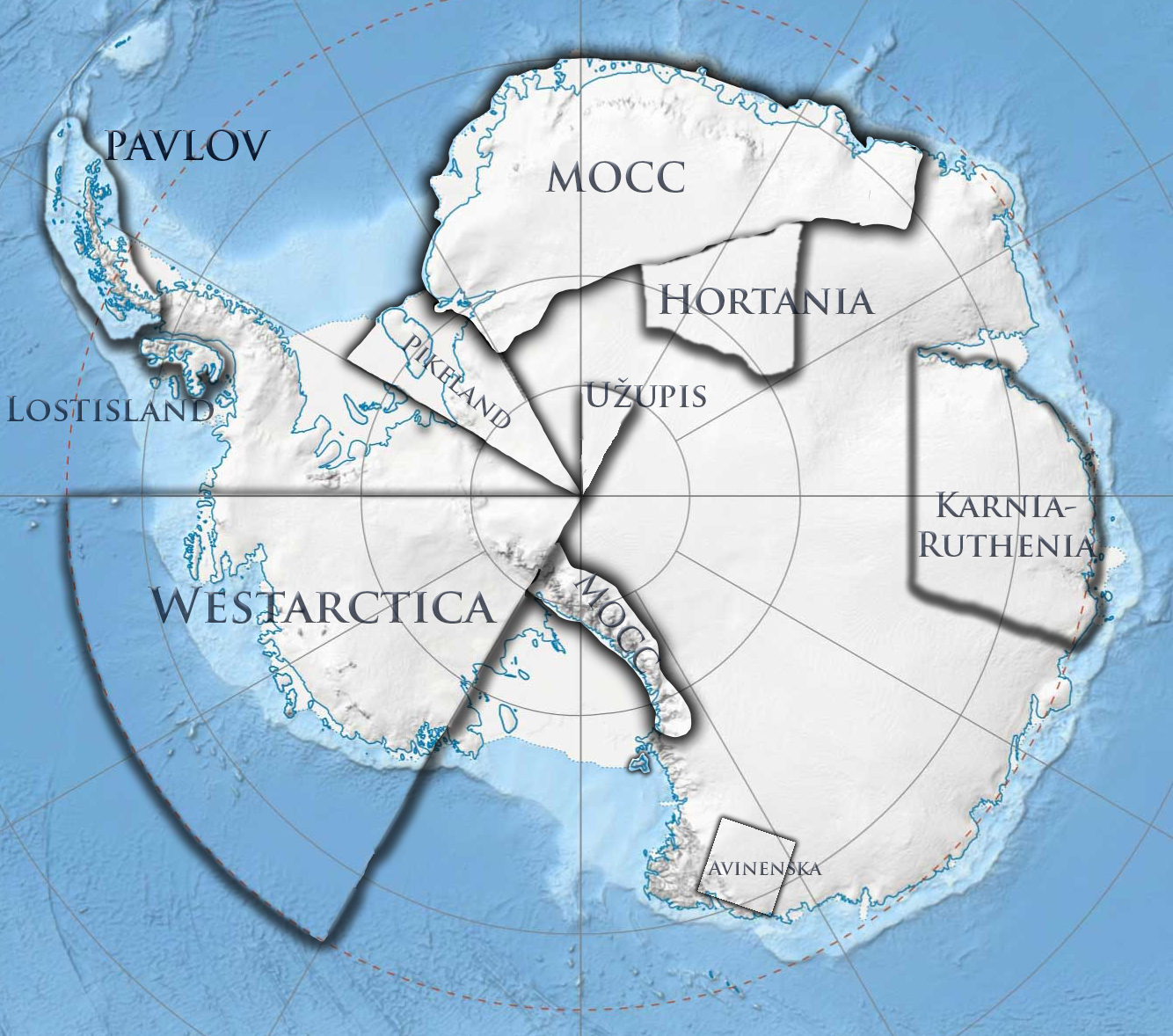
Map of Antarctica divided by micronation claims

The Antarctic Micronational Union was founded on 6 December 2008 by the Grand Duchy of Flandrensis, Mary State, and the Kingdom of Finismund to solve the conflict between these micronations on the one side, and the Grand Duchy of Westarctica on the other. The conflict ended with Westarctica signing the West Antarctic Treaty and joining the AMU on 24 September 2010.

After undergoing a number of reforms and periods of inactivity, the AMU was revived to its present state on February 24, 2020. The Administrative-General of the AMU since September 2014 is Yaroslav Mar, the President of Lostisland, re-elected to another term in February 2020.

== Members ==
The former AMU website listed 15 member micronations. In 2016, AMU was dissolved, and the nine micronations subsequently signed a new treaty. One of the goals of this move was to remove inactive micronations from the membership list.

Members are the following:

Flag	Name
Current
	Missionary Order of the Celtic Cross
	Grand Duchy of Flandrensis
	Empire of Hortania
	Karno-Ruthenian Empire
	Federal Republic of Lostisland
	Empire of Pavlov
	Grand Duchy of Pikeland
	Republic of Užupis
	Grand Duchy of Westarctica
Former
	Directory of Akull
	Kingdom of Albion
	Federated States of Antarctica
	Antarctica’s Elain of Atilnia
	Principality of Arkel
	Federation of Atlantis
	Parliamentary Republic of Dorzhabad
	Keep Watch
	Community of Landashir
	State of the People of West Antarctica
	Democratic Republic of Starland
	Republic of Subenia
	Union of South London Soviet Socialist Republics
