= Pleasure Craft Operator Card =

The Pleasure Craft Operator Card (PCOC) is a document used in Canada as proof of competency to operate a recreational boat with a motor. It is required for any craft fitted with a motor, even if the motor is not in use, for example an auxiliary motor on a sailboat.

PCOC has been required since 1999. Regulations are currently defined under Canadian maritime law by the Canada Shipping Act, 2001. It is not required for non-powered pleasure craft. It is not required in Nunavut and Northwest Territories. Nor is it required by certain indigenous peoples in Canada and non-residents.

If you are a non-resident visiting Canada with your boat, you are not required to carry proof of competency on board as long as your boat is in Canada for less than 45 consecutive days. If you are operating your boat in Canada for 45 consecutive days and more, or operating a boat licensed or registered in Canada, you are required to carry proof of competency, either an operator card or similar proof of competency issued by your home state or country.

== Requirement ==
The PCOC can be obtained by taking a Transport Canada accredited boating safety course, then passing a test. Transport Canada requires a minimum study time of 3 hours for the boating safety course. The boating course is generally split up into 5 chapters with a 10 question multiple choice quiz at the end of each chapter. Curriculum includes:

- nautical terms
- safety equipment and procedures
- Canadian buoys and markers
- sharing the waterways
- rules and regulations
- emergencies
- safe boat operation
- navigation
- emergency preparedness
- fueling safety
- craft loading
- craft inspection

== See also ==
- Canadian Transport Commission
