= West Marine =

American boating and fishing retailer

- Type: Private company
- Industry: Specialty retail and wholesale
- Founded: 1968
- Founder: Randy Repass
- Headquarters: Fort Lauderdale, Florida
- Number of locations: 247
- Products: Boating and fishing
- Number of employees: 5,000 (varies by season)
- Website: www.westmarine.com

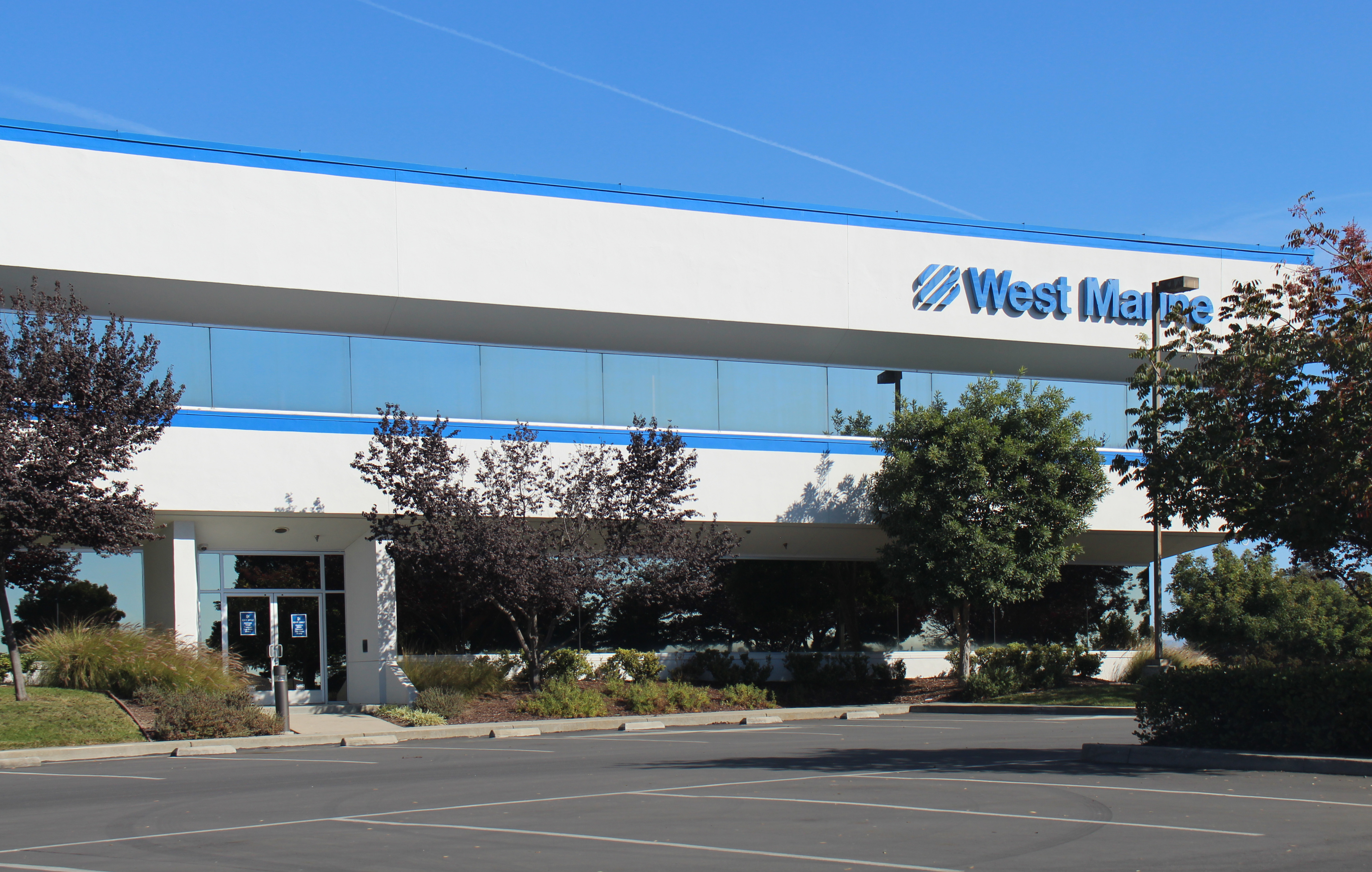
Former headquarters in Watsonville, California

West Marine is an American company based in Fort Lauderdale, Florida, which operates a chain of boating supply and fishing retail stores. The company has 247 retail stores in North America. West Marine also runs Blue Future a non profit organization. West Marine's flagship store is in Fort Lauderdale. Opened on November 11, 2011, the store is the company's largest at over 50,000 square feet.

On May 17, 2026, West Marine filed for voluntary Chapter 11 bankruptcy protection after entering into a restructuring support agreement that would allow the company to delever its capital structure while continuing operations, boosting liquidity and maximizing values.

On June 16, 2026, West Marine announced the closure of 59 stores nationwide. According to the company, these affected locations were deemed underperforming. In July 2026, the company announced 32 additional store closures, bringing the total number of closing stores to 91, or nearly half of their store fleet.

== History ==
The company was founded in 1968 by Randy Repass in Sunnyvale, California, with the name West Coast Ropes, selling nylon rope from Repass' garage. The first retail West Coast Ropes store opened in 1975 in Palo Alto, California. With the acquisition of assets from West Products in 1977, the company changed its name to West Marine Products, Inc. In 1978 West Marine established a wholesale division called Port Supply. In 1991, the first West Marine stores opened on the East Coast of the United States, in Miami and Annapolis, Maryland. In 1993 the company went public on the NASDAQ exchange (symbol WMAR).

In 1996, West Marine merged with E&B Marine, to target a larger customer base of power boat enthusiasts. In 2003 the company acquired the Boat U.S. Product Division.

In December 2007, Geoff Eisenberg replaced Peter Harris as the company's president and chief executive officer.

By 2009, the company was more than three times as large as its nearest competitor, Boater's World, which closed that year, shutting all its stores nationwide.

In April 2012 the company announced that Eisenberg planned to resign. In June 2012, Matt Hyde, a 26-year veteran of REI, became the new president and CEO.

In September 2017, West Marine was acquired by private equity firm Monomoy Capital Partners for $338 million in cash. In October 2017 the company announced that Hyde had left the company.

In January 2018 Doug Robinson was appointed CEO; he left in November 2018. In December 2018, the company announced that Ken Seipel had been appointed CEO.

In April 2021 L Catterton acquired West Marine.

In August 2021 Eric Kufel was appointed as the new CEO.

In November 2022, West Marine announced that it had relocated its headquarters from Watsonville, California to Fort Lauderdale, Florida.

In December 2022 Chuck Rubin was appointed as the new CEO. In February 2023, Mr. Rubin announced a recapitalization. The press release also identified a new CFO, Jim Grady.

West Marine created significant backlash after they filed for bankruptcy in 2026. Multiple vendors reported receiving purchase orders 10-20x the size of largest orders they had ever received from West Marine, immediately prior to the bankruptcy filing. Many vendors have claimed that they were defrauded and that those orders were intentionally timed to allow West Marine to secure summer seasonal inventory without paying for it.

=== Retailing history ===
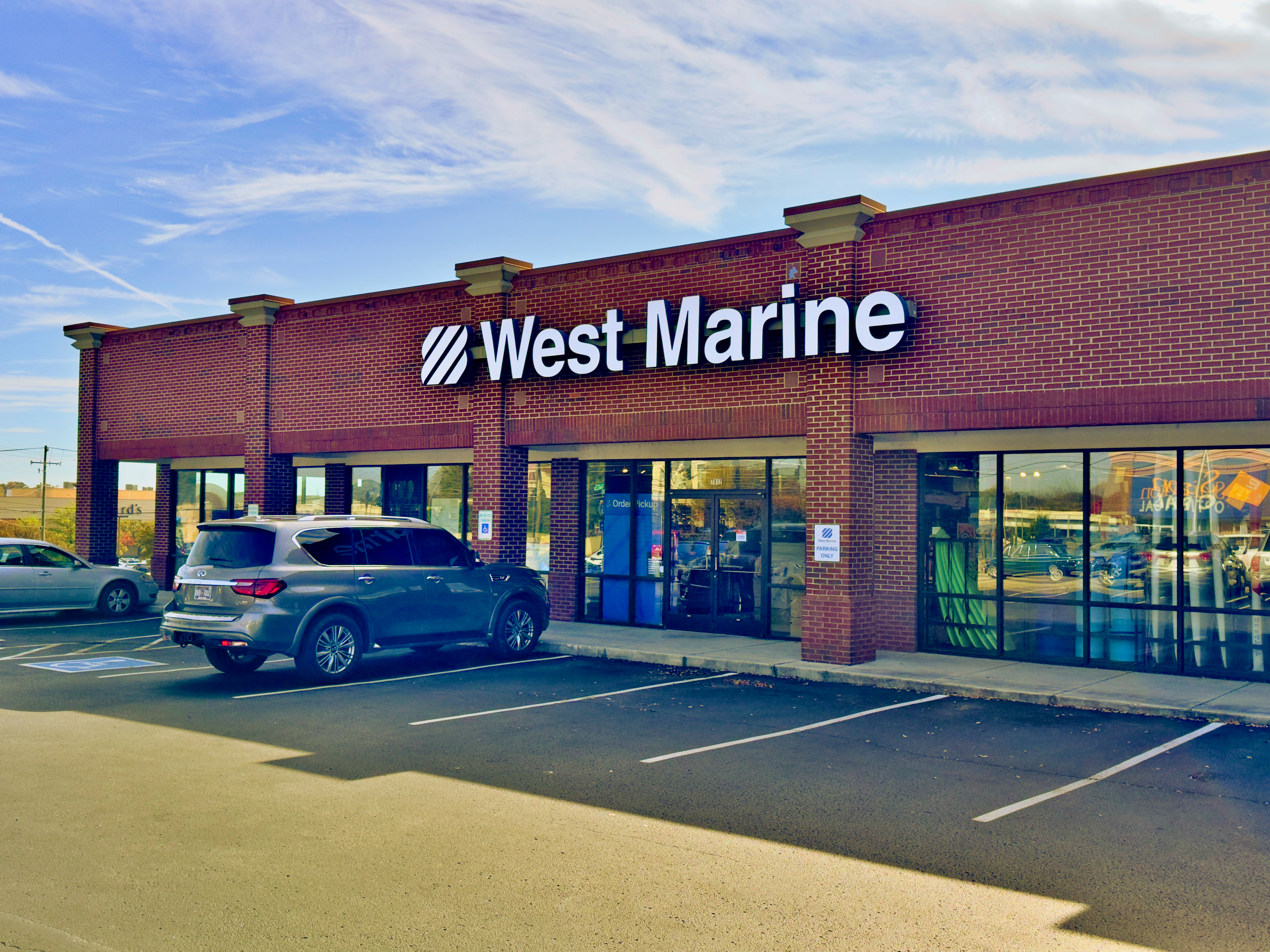
West Marine retail store in Knoxville, Tennessee

In 1996, West Marine's VP Chuck Hawley and a team led by Webmaster & Catalog Systems Analyst Robert Kennedy launched westmarine.com. It quickly became an early leader in online retailers with catalog call center innovations such as upsell and cross-sell exported into online user experiences.

In July 2008, West Marine opened its first franchise store in Istanbul, Turkey. The newly formed company, East Marine Denizcilik ve Turizm A.Ş trades as West Marine Turkey and was majority owned by Rahmi Koç and İbrahim Yazıcı. In March 2009, the second store was opened in Kalamış and June 2009 saw the opening of the third franchise store in Bodrum. The fourth store, in Marmaris, opened in October 2010 with more stores planned around the coast of Turkey. On January 1, 2015, all seven West Marine Franchise stores in Turkey separated from West Marine and became Eastmarine.

In October 2014, West Marine announced that it would close all of its Canadian stores by 2019 as their leases expired; seven of the ten stores in Canada were to close in 2015.

In November 2011, the company opened their largest retail store, with 50,000 square feet, in Fort Lauderdale, Florida.
