= Chapman School of Seamanship =

School for recreational boaters in Florida, US

Coordinates: 27.1506°N 80.2009°W

The Charles F. Chapman School of Seamanship is a 501(c)(3) non-profit school of seamanship training located in Stuart, Florida. The school serves professional and recreational boaters through "learning at the helm" experiential education. Additionally, Chapman School of Seamanship offers a Yacht and Small Craft Marine Surveying program.

== History ==
The Charles F. Chapman School of Seamanship, Inc. was founded in 1971 by the late Glen D. Castle and the late Charles Frederic Chapman and incorporated in Florida in 1972. Castle, an experienced mariner, and Chapman, the veteran boating editor of Motor Boating & Sailing and author of the best selling Piloting, Seamanship & Small Boat Handling, made an interesting combination.

Because of their love for the sea and concern for the lack of maritime vocational training other than from four year institutions, they joined to found the not-for-profit institution to which Chapman gave his name.

Classes began at the School on board a 93 ft. former Coast Guard cutter donated by Canadian monks. From its humble beginnings the School grew from one vessel/classroom to an 8-acre campus, from 3 students to 1,100 a year and to a training fleet of 30 vessels.

== Campus ==
The Chapman School of Seamanship is located near Stuart, Florida on the southeast coast of the state, 40 miles north of West Palm Beach, 110 miles north of Miami. The School's waterfront campus occupies 8 acres on the Manatee Pocket in the village of Port Salerno about 3 nautical miles from the St. Lucie Inlet which opens to the Atlantic Ocean. The campus includes classrooms, labs as well as housing for Chapman students. The air conditioned dormitory style apartments include a kitchen, bath, bedroom, dining area, living room and covered porch. A laundry room is available for student use and there is a large swimming pool with sun-deck and covered patio.

In addition, the school maintains a large fleet of training vessels including power and sail boats. The school is located near the Intracoastal Waterway and Atlantic Ocean.
