= On the Water (magazine) =

On The Water
- Categories: Fishing & Boating magazine
- Frequency: Monthly
- Circulation: 50,000 per month
- Publisher: Christopher Megan
- First issue: May 1996
- Country: America
- Based in: Massachusetts, USA
- Language: English
- Website: OnTheWater.com

On The Water is an American fishing and boating magazine, covering both freshwater and saltwater topics in the Northeast and Mid-Atlantic United States. The majority of its articles are submitted by freelance authors, usually local fishermen and charter-boat captains. On the Water publishes two versions of the magazine, a Mid-Atlantic edition and a New England edition. The magazine includes annual special editions such as the Striper Edition, which focuses on Striped bass, the Angler's Almanac, which forecasts next year's fishing season, and the newly-created BASS edition, with a focus on Northeast Bass fishing.

== History ==
First published in May 1996, On The Water began as a local black-and-white magazine covering fishing and boating on Cape Cod, Massachusetts. With a growing audience, the magazine expanded regionally to offer coverage for all of New England in 1998; taking on the subtitle "The Angler's Guide to New England" to reflect the change. The split to three editions occurred with the Nov/Dec 2017 issue, with New England, New York and New Jersey editions. In 2021 the New York & New Jersey editions were combined into a single NY/NJ edition. In 2023, the combined NY/NJ edition was renamed the Mid-Atlantic edition, which expanded coverage to the Chesapeake Bay region.

=== Color printing ===
During the magazine's first seven years of publication only the cover was printed in full color, with the articles in black and white.

=== New York and New Jersey Edition ===
In March 2009, On The Water launched a New York and New Jersey edition offering coverage of the New York and New Jersey area. With the expansion, the subtitle "The Angler's Guide to New England" was shortened to "The Angler's Guide" on both issues and regionally identified on the cover.

=== Mid-Atlantic Edition ===
In 2023 the combined New York/New Jersey edition was renamed to the Mid-Atlantic edition, which expanded coverage to the Chesapeake Bay region, including the states of Virginia, Washington D.C. and Delaware.

=== On The Water BASS Special Edition ===
In February 2023, a new special edition issue was added called On The Water BASS, with the goal of spotlighting the Northeast bass fishing scene. The issue featured articles written by professional bass fishermen, interviews, and a focus on Largemouth and Smallmouth bass species. Additionally, a new section was added to the On The Water website with bass focused content such as articles and videos.

== Television & Video ==
With the success of the magazine, On The Water began taping a complementary television show in 2002. Titled "On the Water: Fishing New England," the first season aired in 2004. It has since been renamed "On The Water TV".

The show is filmed and produced by On The Water staff, covering both freshwater and saltwater fishing topics. Although the show features a wide range of fishing and locations, each episode is usually centered on a targeted species or specific location. The show will often feature guests with a certain expertise in the episode's topic, who provide informational tips and offer advice.

=== YouTube Series ===
In addition to the television show, On The Water has created several YouTube video series covering various types of recreational fishing. Currently, the series are: From The Surf (Surf fishing), At The Rail (Party Boat Fishing), Living Off The Land & Sea (Catch and Cook) and most recently Kayak Fishing The Coast (Kayak Fishing)

== The Striper Cup ==
In 2006, On The Water introduced its annual fishing tournament dubbed "The Striper Cup," named so for its targeted species the striped bass. The 2006 inaugural Striper Cup ran from May 1 to September 17 and saw over 2,000 fishermen participate. Today, the Striper Cup has an average annual participation of over 5,000 anglers and over $100,000 worth of prizes, including a brand-new fishing boat.

The tournament begins in early May and lasts throughout the summer, culminating in the year-end awards ceremony known as "Striper Fest" in September. Originally, the aim of the contest was to catch the heaviest possible fish rather than the most, so as to prevent overfishing. Anglers could choose to participate individually or as part of a team in the shore division, boat division, or both. Prizes were awarded to weekly, monthly, and overall winners who caught and weighed the largest fish. Every participant was also entered in a random drawing to win one of the grand prizes.

=== Change to Catch & Release Format ===
To promote better conservation of Striped Bass through catch & release fishing, the Striper Cup was changed from a catch-and-kill to catch-and-release format.

Rather than require a fish to be landed, dispatched, and weighed, striped bass of any size can now be caught, photographed, and released for chances to win weekly prizes from various fishing or outdoor brands. This also opened up participation for Youth anglers. The Striper Cup also expanded to include a kayak division with its own separate prizes, including a fishing kayak raffle for the top-10 leaders of the division.
