= United States Power Squadrons =

Non-profit educational organization

The United States Power Squadrons (USPS), also known as America's Boating Club, is a non-profit educational organization, founded in 1914, whose mission is to improve maritime safety and enjoyability through classes in seamanship, navigation, and other related subjects. The USPS comprises approximately 45,000 members organized into 450 squadrons across the United States and in some US territories. It is the largest U.S. non-profit boating organization and has been honored by three U.S. presidents for its civic contributions. Its official publication is The Ensign magazine.

There are many educational opportunities available within the United States Power Squadrons. USPS offers courses that teach basic knowledge necessary to operate boats safely and legally. The basic course meets the requirements set forth by the National Association of State Boating Law Administrators (NASBLA). The United States Power Squadrons offer courses in advanced navigation using modern equipment such as GPS and Radar. Courses are even offered in celestial navigation. USPS also teaches advanced courses in Weather, Marine Engine Maintenance, Marine Electronic and Electrical Systems, Sail, and Cruise Planning.

The United States Power Squadrons conducts vessel safety checks. During a vessel safety check, a qualified USPS vessel examiner will board vessels (with permission) and check for the presence and condition of various pieces of equipment required by federal and state laws for the safe operation of that particular vessel. A vessel safety check is provided at no charge and is not a law enforcement boarding. If the boat carries the proper equipment, a sticker will be awarded to display on the vessel. If a boat does not pass the inspection, the USPS informs the owners, but does not report its findings to any law enforcement or government agency.

A parallel organization operates in Canada under the name Canadian Power and Sail Squadrons (CPS) in English and Escadrilles canadiennes de plaisance (ECP) in French. It was founded as an offshoot of USPS in 1938.

== United States Power Squadrons Ensign ==
USPS Ensign (flag)

The USPS ensign features a red canton with 13 white stars around a fouled (entangled or twisted) anchor. The body of the flag contains 13 vertical blue and white stripes. This flag was designed by Roger Upton and Charles F. Chapman for the United States Power Squadrons, and by 1915, the flag was officially adopted by the organization. The design and other specifications of this ensign are described in the USPS bylaws and also in the operations manual.

Guide to USPS flag display
Flag	Flying times	Power yacht		Sailing yacht with one mast	Any yacht with two masts
Flag	Flying times	without mast	with signal mast	Sailing yacht with one mast	Any yacht with two masts
Ensign of the United States, U.S. yacht ensign (informal), USPS Ensign (when flown in place of U.S. Ensign)	0800 hours to sunset	Flag Stern Staff	Flag Stern Staff	Flag Stern Staff, Underway at Peak of Gaff, 2/3 up Leech of Mainsail, Equivalent Position along Backstay	Flag Stern Staff, Underway at Peak of After-most Gaff, 2/3 up Leech of Mainsail, Equivalent Position along Backstay
USPS Ensign (when not flown in place of U.S. Ensign)	Day and Night when in commission and under command of a USPS member	Antenna or Staff Amidships - preferably to starboard	Starboard Spreader, Inboard Halyard or Port Spreader when flown with Foreign Ensign	Starboard Spreader, Inboard Halyard or Port Spreader when flown with Foreign Ensign	Foremost Starboard Spreader, Inboard Halyard or Port Spreader when flown with Foreign Ensign

== See also ==
- Civil Air Patrol
- United States Coast Guard Auxiliary
- United States Naval Sea Cadet Corps
