= Chesapeake Bay Magazine =

American boating magazine

An issue of Chesapeake Bay Magazine

Chesapeake Bay Magazine is a monthly publication focusing on boating, leisure, and lifestyle on the Chesapeake Bay and surrounding areas. Articles include such topics as "Nautical Know-How" and "boating destinations". Fishing, water sports, and sailing are also highlighted. Spotlights and boat reviews feature various types of boats such as sport yacht cruisers, center consoles, and classics & customs. Showcase sections provide information on marinas, restaurants, and marine services & products. Every year there is a "Best of The Bay" contest where winners and nominees for categories like Best Restaurant, Best Dog Friendly Marina, Best Marine Electronics Shop for places along the Bay as well as a photo contest for best Place, Best People, and Best Wildlife.

== History ==
Chesapeake Bay Magazine debuted in May 1971 as Chesapeake Bay and Bay Country magazine. Based in Reedville, Maryland, and created by Dick and Dixie Goertemiller, the magazine was 32 pages of articles on sailing, Bay history, ecology, and artisans. It was bought by Dick Royer, who was publisher at the time, in 1974. Since that time, the magazine has grown to its current 75–100 page format. In 2014, Dick Royer stepped down, with John Stefancik, formerly the magazine's associate publisher and advertising director, taking over as owner and publisher.

== Background ==
Chesapeake Bay Magazine is currently based in Annapolis, Maryland.

CBM produces an annual Guide to Cruising the Chesapeake, and the Intracoastal Waterway Facilities Guide.

CBM is a member of the International Regional Magazine Association.

== Awards ==
Chesapeake Bay Magazine has earned top honors at the Boating Writers International "Excellence in Boating Journalism" contest. In 2011, CBM was recognized with 8 awards in seven categories.

At the 2009 IRMA awards, Chesapeake Bay Magazine won the following:

- Gold - Limulus Lately - Nature Feature
- Bronze - Chesapeake Bay Magazine - Overall Art Direction
- Bronze - Cash Crop - Environmental Feature
- Award of Merit - Got a Light? - Culture Feature
- Award of Merit - Fishing Forecast - Reader Service

== See also ==
- Delmarva Peninsula
