= Sea History (magazine) =

- Editor: Deirdre O'Regan
- Frequency: Quarterly
- First issue: April 1972
- Company: National Maritime Historical Society
- Country: USA
- Based in: Peekskill New York
- Language: English
- Website: http://www.seahistory.org
- ISSN: 0146-9312

Sea History is a quarterly magazine published by the National Maritime Historical Society (NMHS) focusing on naval and maritime history. The magazine was first published in April 1972. It is edited by Deirdre O'Regan.
