= Lakeland Boating =

Lakeland Boating is a regional magazine that ships eleven times a year and covers the interests of freshwater boaters on the Great Lakes and connecting waterways and inland lakes as far south as Tennessee, as far north as Lake Superior, as far west as Minnesota, and as far east as Quebec.

== History ==
The Sea Toy II

Before founding Lakeland Boating, then called Lakeland Yachting and Motorboating, Vic Schoen was an avid boater. Schoen was then piloting a 36-foot 1925 wooden Burger dubbed Sea Toy II. A great fan of his boat, Schoen also knew that it represented the capital he needed to start a new magazine about boating on the Great Lakes and surrounding environs.

In early 1946, Schoen placed an ad in the Chicago Tribune placing Sea Toy II up for sale. Schoen sold the boat to 26-year-old Paul Cullen for $1,300, the necessary seed money to being a new magazine, Lakeland Yachting and Motorboating.

Lakeland Yachting

Vic Schoen started his new magazine, christened Lakeland Yachting and Motorboating, in mid-1946 and based in Milwaukee, Wisconsin. Under his guidance, Lakeland Yachting was cordial and upbeat on every page, presenting an enthusiast's assurance that boating was pure happiness.

In 1957, the name of the magazine was changed from Lakeland Yachting and Motorboating to Lakeland Boating to more accurately depict the nature of the magazine and its emphasis on motor boats.

1963: Mid-America's Freshwater Yachting Magazine

Only five issues of Lakeland Yachting were published in 1963, and after the first issue of 1964 was published, ownership of the magazine was passed from Schoen to Larry Prakken and Dave Kitz. Prakken would be the publisher, Kitz the editor. Along with this change in ownership came the new slogan, "Mid-America's Freshwater Yachting Magazine" to emphasize its regional orientation.

While Schoen had kept things light and breezy, Kitz set forth his new editorial mission: "First, to report for you the interesting boating activities of the past, present, and future... and second, to raise its voice to help protect and preserve this delightful boating area from the ravages of deterioration that too often accompany the growth of metropolitan areas." Two specific concerns for Kitz were nature's ecological balance and pollution.

After moving their offices to Ann Arbor, Michigan, a subscription cost $4.00 a year for ten issues or 50 cents an issue on the news stand.

Editor Dave Kitz was a strident voice for boaters. In his "View from the Bridge" column he gave boaters a conscience and called out politicians when he felt they were wrong. He was particularly concerned with boat safety.

Kitz bought out Prakken in 1972. Subscriptions were now $5.00 a year of 75 cents an issue.

Instead of publishing their normal pre-boat show issue in 1975, Kitz instead published his "Clean Water" issue, calling on the government to stop Reserve Mining's spoiling of Lake Superior while also lauding the City of Detroit for their work cleaning up the Detroit River, then one of the worst cesspools in America.

Kitz saw boating not as the culmination of one's life but as a worthwhile hobby, once writing, "All too often the boat is misappropriated and, used as a status symbol or an experience with the IRS in mind, it could have anything but a wholesome influence on young people." For fun with the family, he said, boating "Is still one of the best ways to do interesting things together."

Kitz moved the offices to Adrian, Michigan, in 1977 and subscriptions were now $8.00 a year or $1.00 an issue.

1980: Peterson Publications

Kitz sold Lakeland Boating to Peterson Publications in 1980.

Peterson Publications specializes in niche-market magazines and planned on turning Lakeland Boating, which at this time was considered a small-circulation magazine, into a national giant. Peterson quickly tripled Lakeland Boating's circulation to a high of 60,000.

Peterson Publications folded its own Sea magazine into Lakeland Boating, growing the magazine from 40 pages an issue to 130.

Kitz, now an associate publisher for the magazine, found his strong editorial voice gone from the magazine now but continued to write his "View from the Bridge" column until the magazine dropped it upon sale to its current publisher.

1983-present: Walter "Bing" O'Meara

Walter "Bing" O'Meara and David Brown purchased Lakeland Boating in 1983. O'Meara learned magazine publishing in the food service and lodging trade journals.

After their purchase, subscription prices in 1984 were now $15.94 for ten issues a year of $1.75 an issue.

Pleasure boating had been on a downturn since the gasoline crisis] in 1974 when President Jimmy Carter suggested that fuel sales should not take place on weekends. Owing to this, Peterson Publications had found their efforts to go national stymied and had re-focused on the regional aspect of the magazine.

Upon O'Meara's purchase of the magazine, however, boating began an upturn in popularity again that would continue for quite some time.

O'Meara moved the business office to Highland Park, Illinois and brought original owner Vic Schoen back as a correspondent. In June 1985, O'Meara bought out his partner David Brown and moved the offices to Chicago, Illinois. Offices moved to the Fountain Building in Evanston, Illinois in 1988 and to Printer's Row in Chicago in 2003.

The circulation of the magazine as of 2006 was 50,226 copies. Lakeland Boating is a glossy, full-color magazine published eleven times a year.
