= Rosemary Berkel and Harry L. Crisp II Museum =

Crisp Museum
- Established: 1976 (as the University Museum)
- Location: Cape Girardeau, Missouri
- Coordinates: 37.2966°N 89.5220°W
- Type: Art and history museum
- Visitors: Museum Manager James M. Phillips
- Curator: James M. Phillips
- Website: http://www.semo.edu/museum

The Crisp Museum, formally the Rosemary Berkel and Harry L. Crisp II Museum is a U.S. museum located on the River Campus of Southeast Missouri State University in Cape Girardeau, Missouri. It features displays and exhibitions of archaeological and historical artifacts, as well as paintings and other artworks.

Originally the University Museum, the museum received its current name in 2001, and opened in its new building on the River Campus in 2007.

The museum's archaeological collections feature artifacts excavated from prehistoric effigy mounds in Missouri, including ceramic conch shell effigies, whole vessels and stone tools dating from the Paleo-Indian to the Late Mississippian periods. Other Native American items include Kachina dolls, Southwestern blankets, baskets, and decorative beadwork. The museum's history collections include military items, firearms and their accessories, clothing and hand tools.
