= Prince =

Son of a ruler or a title of nobility

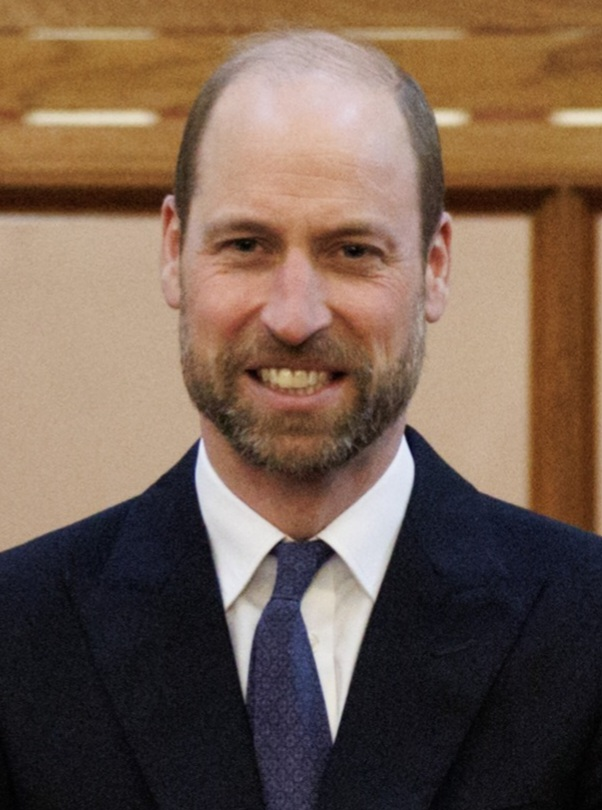
William, Prince of Wales

A prince is a male ruler (ranked below a king, grand prince, and grand duke) or a male member of a monarch's or former monarch's family. Prince is also a title of nobility (often highest), often hereditary, in some European states. The female equivalent is a princess. The English word derives, via the French word prince, from the Latin noun prīnceps, from primus (first) and caput (head), meaning "the first, foremost, the chief, most distinguished, noble ruler, prince".

In a related sense, now not commonly used, all more or less sovereign rulers over a state, including kings, were "princes", they were members of the princely class, in the language of international politics and diplomacy. Princes was thus a collective noun, that applied to the group of sovereign monarchs, even if they used another title, for example king or duke. Many of these were Princes of the Holy Roman Empire.

== Historical background ==
The Latin word prīnceps (older Latin *prīsmo-kaps, lit. 'the one who takes the first [place/position]'), became the usual title of the informal leader of the Roman senate some centuries before the transition to empire, the princeps senatus.

Emperor Augustus established the formal position of monarch on the basis of principate, not dominion. He also tasked his grandsons as summer rulers of the city when most of the government were on holiday in the country or attending religious rituals, and, for that task, granted them the title of princeps.

The title has generic and substantive meanings:

- Generically, prince refers to a member of a family that ruled by hereditary right (such as the House of Sverre in Norway) or to non-reigning descendants, the title referring to sovereigns, former sovereigns' descendants (such as descendants of King Haakon V) or to cadets of a sovereign's family. The term may be broadly used of persons in various cultures, continents or eras. In Europe, it is the title legally borne by dynastic cadets in monarchies, and borne by courtesy by members of formerly reigning dynasties.
- As a substantive title, a prince was a monarch of the lowest rank in post-Napoleonic Europe, e.g. Princes of Andorra, Hohenzollern-Sigmaringen, Mingrelia, Monaco, Waldeck and Pyrmont, Wallachia, etc.
- Also substantively, the title was granted by popes and secular monarchs to specific individuals and to the heads of some high-ranking European families who, however, never exercised dynastic sovereignty and whose cadets are not entitled to share the princely title, viz the Princes de Beauvau-Craon, von Bismarck, Colonna, von Dohna-Schlobitten, von Eulenburg, de Faucigny-Lucinge, von Lichnowsky, von Pless, Ruffo di Calabria, (de Talleyrand) von Sagan, van Ursel, etc.
- Generically, cadets of some non-sovereign families whose head bears the non-dynastic title of prince (or, less commonly, duke) were sometimes also authorized to use the princely title, e.g. von Carolath-Beuthen, de Broglie, Demidoff di San Donato, Lieven, de Merode, Pignatelli, Radziwill, von Wrede, Yussopov, etc.
- Substantively, the heirs apparent in some monarchies use a specific princely title associated with a territory within the monarch's realm, e.g. the Princes of Asturias (Spain, formerly Castile), Grão Pará (Brazil, formerly), Orange (Netherlands), Girona (Crown of Aragon, formerly), Viana (Navarre, formerly), Wales (U.K.), etc.
- Substantively, it became the fashion from the 17th century for the heirs apparent of the leading ducal families to assume a princely title, associated with a seigneurie in the family's possession. These titles were borne by courtesy and preserved by tradition, not law, e.g. the princes de, respectively, Bidache (Gramont), Marcillac (La Rochefoucauld), Tonnay-Charente (Mortemart), Poix (Noailles), Léon (Rohan-Chabot), etc.

== Prince as generic term for ruler ==
The original but now less common use of the word was the application of the Latin word prīnceps, from late Roman law and the classical system of government that eventually gave way to the European feudal society. In this sense, a prince is a ruler of a territory that is sovereign or quasi-sovereign, i.e., exercising substantial (though not all) prerogatives associated with monarchs of independent nations, such as the immediate states within the historical boundaries of the Holy Roman Empire. In medieval and early modern Europe, there were as many as two hundred such territories, especially in Italy, Germany, and Gaelic Ireland. In this sense, "prince" is used of any and all rulers, regardless of actual title or precise rank. This is the Renaissance use of the term found in Niccolò Machiavelli's famous work, Il Principe. It is also used in this sense in the United States Declaration of Independence.

As a title, by the end of the medieval era, prince was borne by rulers of territories that were either substantially smaller than those of, or who exercised fewer of the rights of sovereignty than did, emperors and kings. A lord of even a quite small territory might come to be referred to as a prince before the 13th century, either from translations of a native title into the Latin prīnceps (as for the hereditary ruler of Wales) or when the lord's territory was allodial. The lord of an allodium owned his lands and exercised prerogatives over the subjects in his territory absolutely, owing no feudal homage or duty as a vassal to a liege lord, nor being subject to any higher jurisdiction. Most small territories designated as principalities during feudal eras were allodial, e.g. the Princedom of Dombes.

Lords who exercised lawful authority over territories and people within a feudal hierarchy were also sometimes regarded as princes in the general sense, especially if they held the rank of count or higher. This is attested in some surviving styles — e.g. British earls, marquesses, and dukes are still addressed by the monarch on ceremonial occasions as high and noble princes (cf. Royal and noble styles).

In parts of the Holy Roman Empire in which primogeniture did not prevail (e.g., Germany), all legitimate agnates had an equal right to the family's hereditary titles. While titles such as emperor, king, and elector could only be legally occupied by one dynast (person) at a time, holders of such other titles as duke, margrave, landgrave, count palatine, and prince could only differentiate themselves by adding the name of their appanage to the family's original title. This tended to proliferate unwieldy titles (e.g. Princess Katherine of Anhalt-Zerbst; Karl, Count Palatine of Zweibrücken-Neukastell-Kleeburg; or Prince Christian Charles of Schleswig-Holstein-Sonderburg-Plön-Norburg). As agnatic primogeniture gradually became the norm in the Holy Roman Empire, by the end of the 18th century, another means of distinguishing the monarch from other members of his dynasty became necessary. Gradual substitution of the title of Prinz for the monarch's title of Fürst occurred, and became customary for cadets in all German dynasties except in the grand duchies of Mecklenburg and Oldenburg. Both Prinz and Fürst are translated into English as "prince", but they reflect not only different but mutually exclusive concepts.

This distinction had evolved before the 18th century (although Liechtenstein long remained an exception, with cadets and females using Fürst/Fürstin into the 19th century) for dynasties headed by a Fürst in Germany. The custom spread through the Continent to such an extent that a renowned imperial general who belonged to a cadet branch of a reigning ducal family, remains best known to history by the generic dynastic title, "Prince Eugene of Savoy". Note that the princely title was used as a prefix to his Christian name, which also became customary.

Cadets of France's other princes étrangers affected similar usage under the Bourbon kings. Always facing the scepticism of Saint-Simon and like-minded courtiers, these quasi-royal aristocrats' assumption of the princely title as a personal, rather than territorial, designation encountered some resistance. In writing Histoire Genealogique et Chonologique, Père Anselme accepts that, by the end of the 17th century, the heir apparent to the House of La Tour d'Auvergne's sovereign duchy bears the title Prince de Bouillon, but he would record in 1728 that the heir's La Tour cousin, the Count of Oliergues, is "known as the Prince Frederick" ("dit le prince Frédéric").

The post-medieval rank of gefürsteter Graf (princely count) embraced but elevated the German equivalent of the intermediate French, English and Spanish nobles. In the Holy Roman Empire, these nobles rose to dynastic status by preserving from the Imperial crown (de jure after the Peace of Westphalia in 1648) the exercise of such sovereign prerogatives as: the minting of money; the muster of military troops; the right to wage war and contract treaties; local judicial authority and constabulary enforcement; and the habit of inter-marrying with sovereign dynasties. By the 19th century, cadets of a Fürst would become known as Prinzen.

== Princes consort and princes of the blood ==
The husband of a queen regnant is usually titled "prince consort" or simply "prince", whereas the wives of male monarchs take the female equivalent (e.g., empress, queen) of their husband's title. In Brazil, Portugal and Spain, however, the husband of a female monarch is accorded the masculine equivalent of her title (e.g., emperor, king), at least after he fathered her heir. In previous epochs, husbands of queens regnant were often deemed entitled to the crown matrimonial, sharing their consorts' regnal title and rank jure uxoris.

However, in cultures which allow the ruler to have several wives or official concubines (e.g., Imperial China, Ottoman Empire, Thailand, the Zulu monarchy), these women, sometimes collectively referred to as a harem, often have specific rules determining their relative hierarchy and a variety of titles, which may distinguish between those whose offspring can be in line for the succession or not, or specifically who is mother to the heir to the throne.

To complicate matters, the style His/Her (Imperial/Royal) Highness, a prefix often accompanying the title of a dynastic prince, may be awarded/withheld separately (as a compromise or consolation prize, in some sense, e.g., Duke of Cádiz, Duchess of Windsor, Princesse de Réthy, Prince d'Orléans-Braganza).

Although the arrangement set out above is the one that is most commonly understood, there are also different systems. Depending on country, epoch, and translation, other usages of "prince" are possible.

Foreign-language titles such as Italian: principe, French: prince, German: Fürst, German: Prinz (non-reigning descendant of a reigning monarch), Ukrainian and Russian: князь, romanized: knyaz, etc., are usually translated as "prince" in English.

Some princely titles are derived from those of national rulers, such as tsarevich from tsar. Other examples are (e)mirza(da), khanzada, nawabzada, sahibzada, shahzada, sultanzada (all using the Persian patronymic suffix -zada, meaning "son, descendant"). However, some princely titles develop in unusual ways, such as adoption of a style for dynasts which is not pegged to the ruler's title, but rather continues an old tradition (e.g., "grand duke" in Romanov Russia or "archduke" in Habsburg Austria), claims dynastic succession to a lost monarchy (e.g. Prince de Tarente for the La Trémoïlle heirs to the Neapolitan throne), or descends from a ruler whose princely title or sovereign status was not de jure hereditary, but attributed to descendants as an international courtesy, (e.g., Bibesco-Bassaraba de Brancovan, Poniatowski, Ypsilanti).

=== Specific titles ===
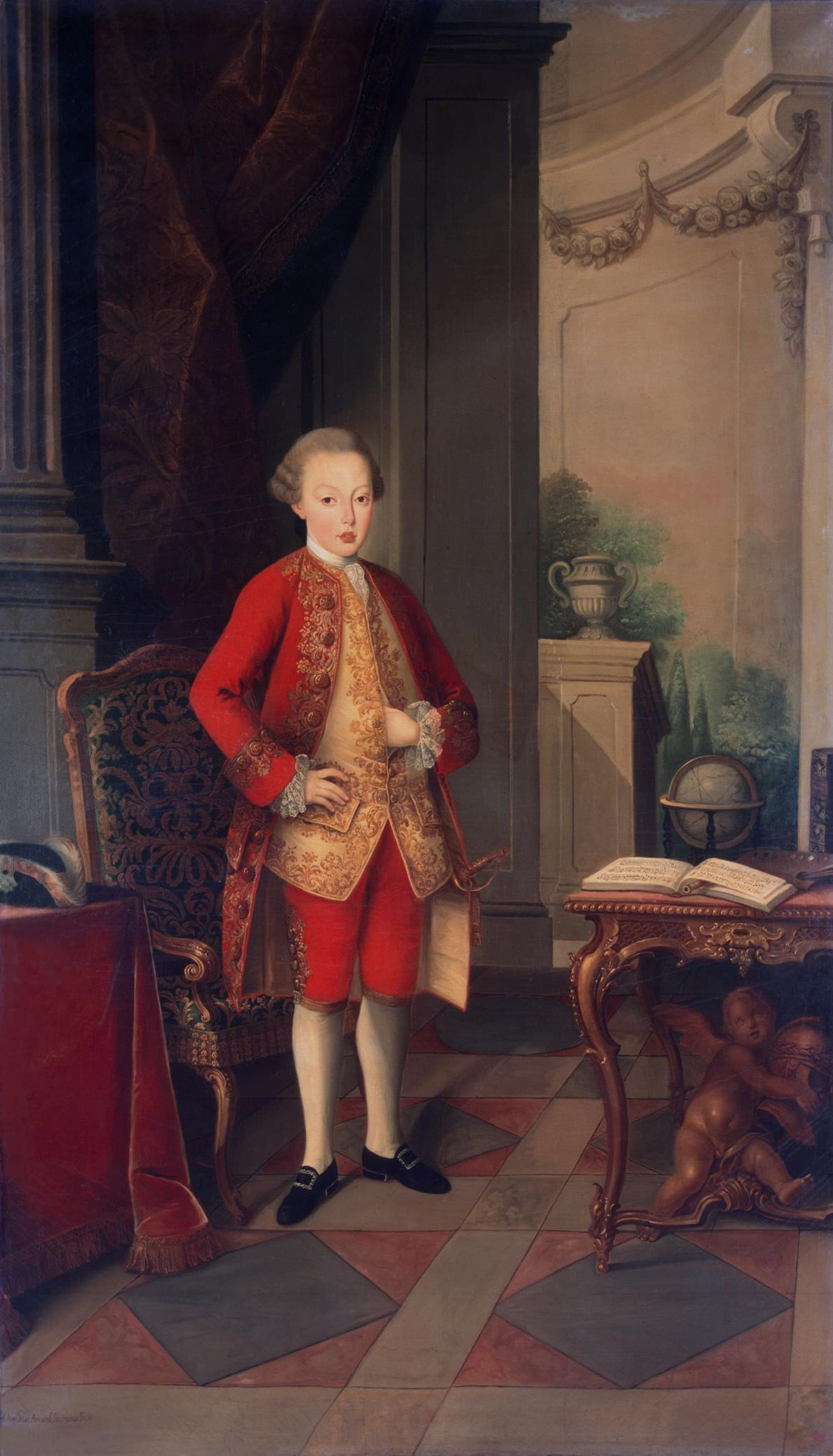
José, Prince of Brazil, Duke of Braganza, died before he could ascend to the throne of Portugal.

In some dynasties, a specific style other than prince has become customary for dynasts, such as fils de France in the House of Capet, and Infante. Infante was borne by children of the monarch other than the heir apparent in all of the Iberian monarchies. Some monarchies used a specific princely title for their heirs, such as Prince of Asturias in Spain, Prince of Brazil in Portugal, and (customarily but not automatically) Prince of Wales in the United Kingdom.

Sometimes a specific title is commonly used by various dynasties in a region, e.g. Mian in various of the Punjabi princely Hill States (lower Himalayan region in British India).

European dynasties usually awarded appanages to princes of the blood, typically attached to a feudal noble title, such as Prince of Orange in the Netherlands, Britain's royal dukes, the Dauphin in France, the Count of Flanders in Belgium, and the Count of Syracuse in Sicily. Sometimes appanage titles were princely, e.g. Prince of Achaia (Courtenay), Prince de Condé (Bourbon), Prince of Carignan (Savoy), but it was that their owners were of princely rank rather than that they held a princely title which was the source of their pre-eminence.

For the often specific terminology concerning an heir apparent, see Crown prince.

== Prince as a substantive title ==
Other princes derive their title not from dynastic membership as such, but from inheritance of a title named for a specific and historical territory. The family's possession of prerogatives or properties in that territory might be long past. Such were most of the "princedoms" of France's ancien régime, so resented for their pretentiousness in the memoirs of Saint-Simon. These included the princedoms of Arches-Charleville, Boisbelle-Henrichemont, Chalais, Château-Regnault, Guéménée, Martigues, Mercœur, Sedan, Talmond, Tingrey, and the "kingship" of Yvetot, among others.

=== Prince as a reigning monarch ===
A prince or princess who is the head of state of a territory that has a monarchy as a form of government is a reigning prince.

==== Extant principalities ====
- The co-principality of Andorra (current reigning princes are the French President Emmanuel Macron and HE Josep-Lluís Serrano Pentinat)
- The emirate of Kuwait (current reigning emir is Mishal Al-Ahmad Al-Jaber Al-Sabah)
- The principality of Liechtenstein (current reigning prince is Hans-Adam II)
- The principality of Monaco (current reigning prince is Albert II)
- The Sovereign Military Order of Malta (current prince and Grand Master is John T. Dunlap)
- The emirate of Qatar (current reigning emir is Tamim bin Hamad Al Thani)
- The member emirates of the federation in the United Arab Emirates (United Arab Principalities):
  - Abu Dhabi (Emir Mohamed bin Zayed Al Nahyan, also President of the UAE)
  - Ajman (Emir Humaid bin Rashid Al Nuaimi)
  - Dubai (Emir Mohammed bin Rashid Al Maktoum, also Vice President and Prime Minister of the UAE)
  - Fujairah (Emir Hamad bin Mohammed Al Sharqi)
  - Ras al-Khaimah (Emir Saud bin Saqr Al Qasimi)
  - Sharjah (Emir Sultan III bin Muhammad al-Qasimi)
  - Umm al-Quwain (Emir Saud bin Rashid Al Mualla)
Coat of arms of the principality of Andorra (1607).

Coat of arms of the principality of Liechtenstein (1719).

Coat of arms of the principality of Monaco (1297).

==== Micronations ====
In the same tradition, some self-proclaimed monarchs of so-called micronations style themselves as princes:

- Roy Bates titled himself "Prince Roy" of the Principality of Sealand
- Leonard George Casley titled himself "Prince Leonard I" of the Principality of Hutt River (enclave in Australia)

==== Prince exercising head of state's authority ====
Various monarchies provide for different modes in which princes of the dynasty can temporarily or permanently share in the style and/or office of the monarch, e.g. as regent or viceroy.

Though these offices may not be reserved legally for members of the ruling dynasty, in some traditions they are filled by dynasts, a fact which may be reflected in the style of the office, e.g. "prince-president" for Napoleon III as French head of state but not yet emperor, or "prince-lieutenant" in Luxembourg, repeatedly filled by the crown prince before the grand duke's abdication, or in form of consortium imperii.

Some monarchies even have a practice in which the monarch can formally abdicate in favour of his heir and yet retain a kingly title with executive power, e.g. Maha Upayuvaraja (Sanskrit for Great Joint King in Cambodia), though sometimes also conferred on powerful regents who exercised executive powers.

=== Non-dynastic princes ===
Coat of arms of Otto, prince of Bismarck (German Empire).

In several countries of the European continent, such as France, prince can be an aristocratic title of someone having a high rank of nobility or as lord of a significant fief, but not ruling any actual territory and without any necessary link to the royal family, such as Andora, which makes it difficult to compare with the British system of royal princes.

==== France and the Holy Roman Empire ====
The kings of France started to bestow the style of prince, as a title among the nobility, from the 16th century onwards. These titles were created by elevating a seigneurie to the nominal status of a principality—although prerogatives of sovereignty were never conceded in the letters patent. Princely titles self-assumed by the princes du sang and by the princes étrangers were generally tolerated by the king and used at the royal court, outside the Parlement of Paris. These titles held no official place in the hierarchy of the nobility, but were often treated as ranking just below ducal peerages, since they were often inherited (or assumed) by ducal heirs:

- French titles of prince recognized by the king
  - Holy Roman Empire states annexed by France
    - Arches-Charleville: in the Ardennes region, near the border with the Empire
    - Château-Renaud: near Arches-Charleville
    - Dombes: on the east bank of the Rhône
    - Orange
    - Sedan: held by the Dukes of Bouillon
  - Ancient principalities seated in the Kingdom of France
    - Boisbelle, later Henrichemont: in the Berry region, a sovereign principality recognized in 1598
    - Luxe: in the Béarn region, also styled Sovereign Count (cf. Princely Count)
    - Yvetot: in the Normandy region, recognized, nominally, as King of Yvetot
  - Principalities created by the King
    - Château-Porcien: in the Ardennes region, created in 1561 for the House of Croÿ
    - Guéméné: in Brittany, created in 1667 for the House of Rohan (title borne by the Duke of Montbazon or his heir)
    - Joinville: in the Champagne region, created in 1552 for the House of Lorraine
    - Martigues: in the Provence region, created 16th century for cadets of the House of Lorraine
    - Mercœur: in the Auvergne region, created in 1563 for cadets of the House of Lorraine, later a duchy; recreated in 1719
    - Tingry: in the Nord-Pas-de-Calais region, created in 1587 for the House of Luxemburg
  - The princes of Condé and Conti, heads of cadet branches of the French royal House of Bourbon: used recognized princely titles, but the lordships of Condé and Conti were never formally created principalities by the King
- Unrecognized titles of Prince
  - Aigremont
  - Anet: used by the Dukes of Vendôme, then the Dukes of Penthièvre
  - Antibes: claimed by the de Grasse family
  - Bédeille: in Béarn
  - Bidache: in Béarn used by the Dukes of Gramont, but the heir was usually styled Count of Guiche rather than Prince of Bidache
  - Carency: in Artois (originally a lordship of the House of Bourbon, it was inherited by the Counts of La Vauguyon, who used the style of Prince of Carency for the heir)
  - Chabanais: in Angoumois; reduced to a marquisate in 1702
  - Chalais: in Périgord (inherited by the elder branch of the Talleyrand family; Spanish Grandeeship attached to the title in 1714)
  - Commercy: lordship of Lorraine (cadets of the House of Lorraine used the style of Prince of Commercy)
  - Courtenay: the House of Courtenay legitimately descended from Louis VI of France but was not recognized as princes du sang by France's kings. The last branch of the house used the style of Prince of Courtenay from the 17th century. The style passed to the Dukes of Bauffremont.
  - Elbeuf: lordship of Normandy (younger sons of the House of Guise used the style of prince d'Elbeuf; later a duchy)
  - Lamballe: in Brittany, used by the heir of the Bourbon Duke of Penthièvre
  - Lambesc: in Provence, used by various cadets of the House of Guise, notably by the heirs of the Dukes of Elbeuf
  - Léon: viscountcy of Brittany (the heirs of the Dukes of Rohan used the style of Prince of Léon)
  - Listenois: in Franche-Comté, used by the Dukes of Bauffremont after the Courtenay inheritance
  - Marcillac: in Angoumois, used by the heir of the Duke de La Rochefoucauld
  - Maubuisson: in Île-de-France, used by the Dukes of Rohan-Rohan
  - Montauban: in Brittany, used by various cadets of the House of Rohan
  - Montbazon: a duchy of the House of Rohan, style of Prince of Montbazon used by various cadets of the House
  - Mortagne: in Aquitaine, used by the Dukes of Richelieu
  - Poix: in Picardy, used by various families, twice raised to a duchy
  - Pons: in Saintonge, used by cadets of the House of Guise
  - Rochefort: used by cadets of the House of Rohan
  - Soubise: used by head of the second branch of the House of Rohan, also Dukes of Rohan-Rohan
  - Soyons: in Dauphiné, used by cadets of the Dukes of Uzès
  - Talmond: in Vendée, used by the Dukes of La Trémoïlle
  - Tonnay-Charente: used by the heirs of the Dukes of Mortemart
  - Turenne: viscounty of the House of La Tour d'Auvergne, style of Prince de Turenne used by cadets of the house

This can even occur in a monarchy within which an identical but real and substantive feudal title exists, such as Fürst in German. An example of this is:

- Otto von Bismarck was created Prince von Bismarck in the empire of reunited Germany, under the Hohenzollern dynasty.

==== Spain, France and Netherlands ====
Coat of arms of the Princes of Waterloo (the Netherlands).

In other cases, such titular princedoms are created in chief of an event, such as a treaty or a victory. Examples include:

- The Spanish minister Manuel Godoy was created Principe de la Paz ("Prince of Peace") by his king for negotiating the 1795 double peace treaty of Basilea, by which the revolutionary French republic made peace with Prussia and with Spain.
- The triumphant generals who led their troops to victory often received a victory title from Napoleon, both princely and ducal.
- King William I of the Netherlands bestowed the victory title of Prince of Waterloo upon the 1st Duke of Wellington after his defeat of Napoleon I Bonaparte at Waterloo in 1815.
- Joseph Bonaparte conferred the title "Prince of Spain" to be hereditary on his children and grandchildren in the male and female line.

==== Eastern Europe ====
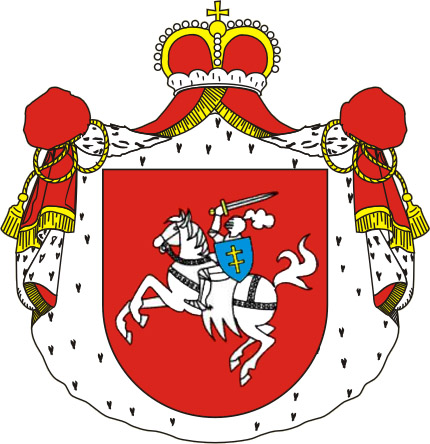
Coat of arms of the princes Sanguszko-Lubartowicz (Poland).

In the former Polish-Lithuanian Commonwealth, the titles of prince dated either to the times before the Union of Lublin or were granted to Polish nobles by foreign monarchs, as the law in Poland forbade the king from dividing nobility by granting them hereditary titles: see The Princely Houses of Poland.

Coat of arms of Galicia-Volhynian princes

In Ukraine, landlords and rulers of Kievan Rus' were called князь (knjazʹ), translated as "prince". Similarly, foreign titles of "prince" were translated as knyaz in Ukrainian (e. g. Ivan Mazepa, "knyaz of Holy Roman Empire"). Princes of Rurik Dynasty obeyed their oldest brother, who was taking the title of Grand Prince of Kiev. In 14th their ruling role was taken by Lithuanian princes, which used the title of Grand Prince of Lithuania and Ruthenia. With the rise of cossacks, many former Ukrainian princes were incorporated into the new Cossack nobility.

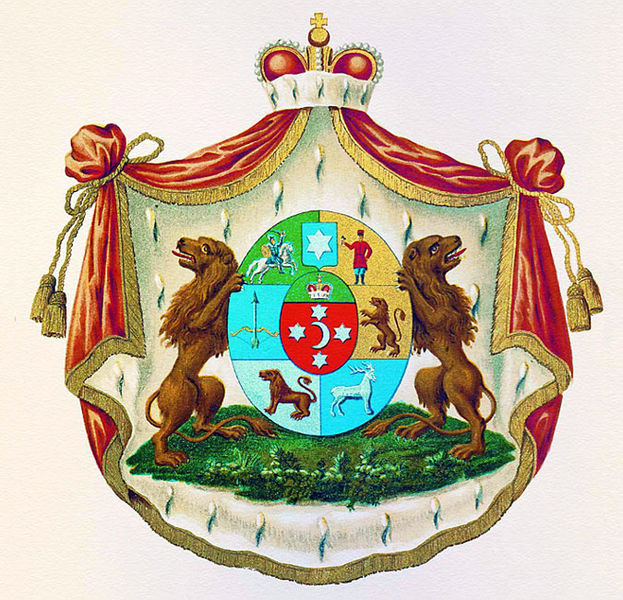
Coat of arms of the princes Youssoupoff

In the Russian system, knyaz was the highest degree of official nobility. Members of older dynasties, whose realms were eventually annexed to the Russian Empire, were also accorded the title of knyazʹ—sometimes after first being allowed to use the higher title of tsarevich (e.g. the Princes Gruzinsky and Sibirsky).

== Title in various European traditions and languages ==
In the Netherlands, Belgium, France, Italy, Ukraine, Japan, Lithuania, Portugal, Russia, Spain, Belarus and Hungary the title of prince has also been used as the highest title of nobility (without membership in a ruling dynasty), above the title of duke, while the same usage (then as Fürst) has occurred in Germany and Austria but then one rank below the title of duke and above count.

In each case, the title is followed (when available) by the female form and then (not always available, and obviously rarely applicable to a prince of the blood without a principality) the name of the territory associated with it, each separated by a slash. If a second title (or set) is also given, then that one is for a Prince of the blood, the first for a principality. Be aware that the absence of a separate title for a prince of the blood may not always mean no such title exists; alternatively, the existence of a word does not imply there is also a reality in the linguistic territory concerned; it may very well be used exclusively to render titles in other languages, regardless whether there is a historical link with any (which often means that linguistic tradition is adopted)

Etymologically, we can discern the following traditions (some languages followed a historical link, e.g. within the Holy Roman Empire, not their language family; some even fail to follow the same logic for certain other aristocratic titles):

=== Romance languages ===
- Languages (mostly Romance) only using the Latin root prīnceps:
  - Catalan: Príncep/Princesa, Príncep/Princesa
  - French: Prince/Princesse, Prince/Princesse
  - Friulian: Princip/Principesse, Princip/Principesse
  - Italian: Principe/Principessa, Principe/Principessa
  - Latin (post-Roman): Princeps/*Princeps/*
  - Monegasque: Principu/Principessa, Principu/Principessa
  - Occitan: Prince/Princessa, Prince/Princessa
  - Portuguese: Príncipe/Princesa, Príncipe/Princesa
  - Rhaeto-Romansh: Prinzi/Prinzessa, Prinzi/Prinzessa
  - Romanian: Prinţ/Prinţesă, Principe/Principesă
  - Spanish: Príncipe/Princesa, Príncipe/Princesa
  - Venetian: Principe/Principessa, Principe/Principessa

=== Celtic languages ===
- Celtic languages:
  - Breton: Priñs/Priñsez
  - Irish: Prionsa/Banphrionsa, Flaith/Banfhlaith
  - Scottish Gaelic: Prionnsa/Bana-phrionnsa, Flath/Ban-fhlath
  - Welsh: Tywysog/Tywysoges, Prins/Prinses

=== Germanic languages ===
- Languages (mainly Germanic) that use (generally alongside a prīnceps-derivate for princes of the blood) an equivalent of the German Fürst:
  - English: Prince/Princess, Prince/Princess
  - Afrikaans: Prins
  - Danish: Fyrste/Fyrstinde, Prins/Prinsesse
  - Dutch: Vorst/Vorstin, Prins/Prinses
  - Faroese: Fúrsti/Fúrstafrúa/Fúrstinna, Prinsur/Prinsessa
  - West Frisian: Foarst/Foarstinne, Prins/Prinsesse
  - German: Fürst/Fürstin, Prinz/Prinzessin
  - Icelandic: Fursti/Furstynja, Prins/Prinsessa
  - Luxembourgish: Fürst/Fürstin, Prënz/Prinzessin
  - Norwegian: Fyrste/Fyrstinne, Prins/Prinsesse
  - Old English: Ǣðeling/Hlæfdiġe
  - Swedish: Furste/Furstinna, Prins/Prinsessa

=== Slavic languages ===
- Slavic:
  - Belarusian: Karalevich/Karalewna, Prynts/Pryntsesa, Knyazhych/Knyazhnya
  - Bosnian: Кнез/Кнегиња (Knez/Kneginja), Краљевић/Краљевна (Kraljević/Kraljevna), Принц/Принцеза (Princ/Princeza)
  - Bulgarian (phonetically spelt): Knyaz/Knyaginya, Prints/Printsesa
  - Croatian: Knez/Kneginja, Kraljević/Kraljevna, Princ/Princeza
  - Czech: Kníže/Kněžna, Kralevic, Princ/Princezna
  - Macedonian: Knez/Knegina, Princ/Princeza
  - Polish: Książę/Księżna, Królewicz/Królewna
  - Russian: Князь/Княгиня (Knyaz/Knyagina/Knyazhna), Tsarevich/Tsarevna, Korolyevich/Korolyevna, Prints/Printsessa
  - Serbian: Кнез/Кнегиња (Knez/Kneginja), Краљевић/Краљевна (Kraljević/Kraljevna), Принц/Принцеза (Princ/Princeza)
  - Slovak: Knieža/Kňažná, Kráľovič, Princ/Princezná
  - Slovene: Knez/Kneginja, Princ/Princesa, Kraljevič/Kraljična
  - Ukrainian: Княжич/Кяжна (Kniazhych/Kniazhna), Королевич/Королівна (Korolevych/Korolivna), Принц/Принцеса (Prynts/Pryntsesa), Гетьманич/Гетьманівна (Hetmanych/Hetmanivna)

Georgian prince, Tavadi.

=== Other Western languages ===
- Albanian: Princ/Princeshë, Princ/Princeshë
- Estonian: Vürst/Vürstinna, Prints/Printsess
- Finnish: Ruhtinas/Ruhtinatar, Prinssi/Prinsessa
- Georgian: თავადი/Tavadi, უფლისწული/"Uplists'uli" ("Child of the Lord")
- Greek (Medieval, formal): Πρίγκηψ/Πριγκήπισσα (Prinkips/Prinkipissa)
- Greek (Modern, colloquial): Πρίγκηπας/Πριγκήπισσα (Prinkipas/Prinkipissa)
- Hungarian (Magyar): Herceg/Hercegnő or Fejedelem/Fejedelemnő if head of state
- Latvian: Firsts/Firstiene, Princis/Princese
- Lithuanian: Kunigaikštis/Kunigaikštienė, Princas/Princese
- Maltese: Prinċep/Prinċipessa, Prinċep/Prinċipessa

== Title in non-European traditions and languages ==
The below is essentially the story of European, Christian dynasties and other nobility, also 'exported' to their colonial and other overseas territories and otherwise adopted by rather westernized societies elsewhere (e.g. Haiti).

Applying these essentially western concepts, and terminology, to other cultures even when they don't do so, is common but in many respects rather dubious. Different (historical, religious...) backgrounds have also begot significantly different dynastic and nobiliary systems, which are poorly represented by the 'closest' western analogy.

It therefore makes sense to treat these per civilization.

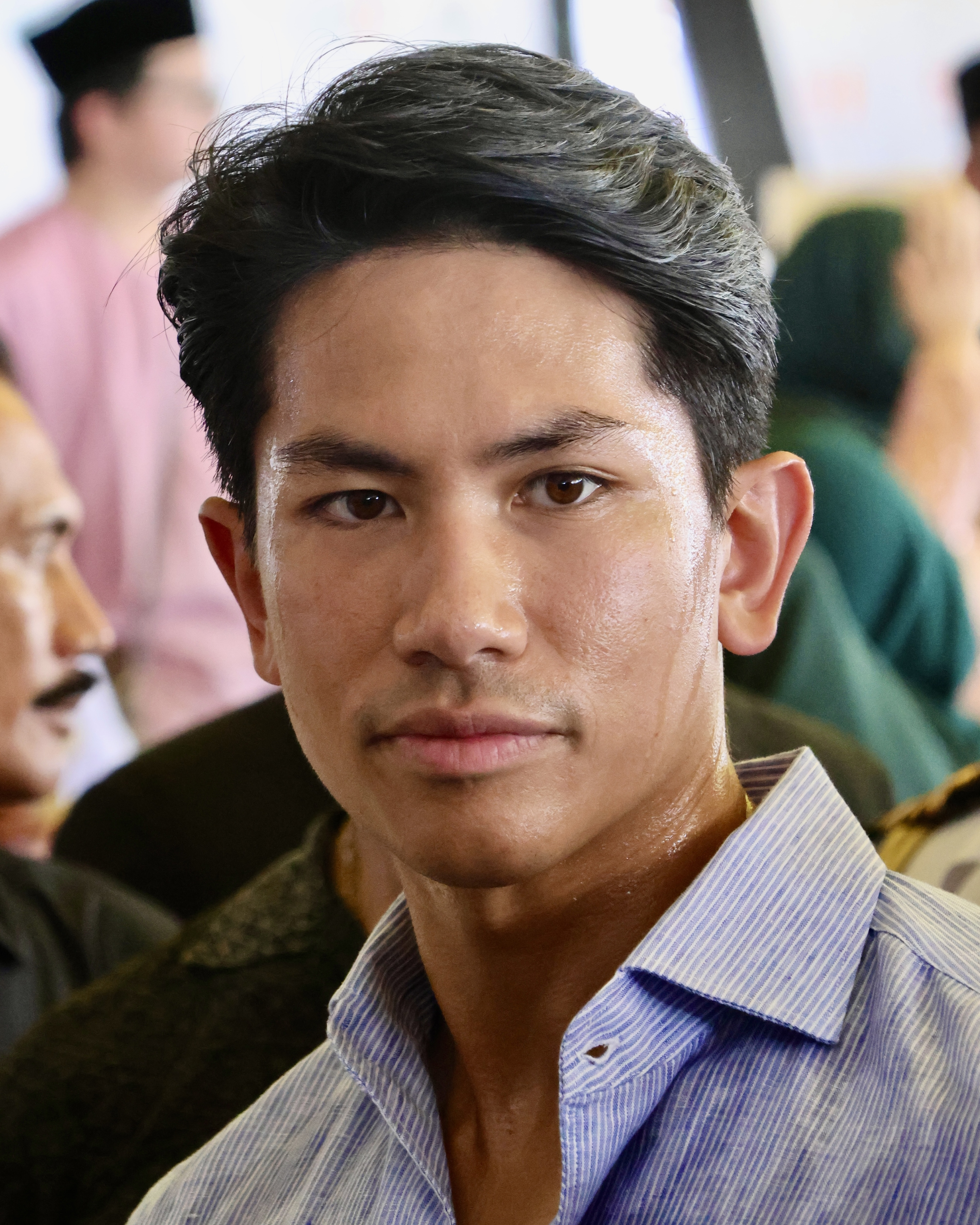
Prince 'Abdul Mateen of Brunei, holds the title of Pengiran Muda (Prince) as he is the son of Sultan Hassanal Bolkiah.

=== Brunei ===
It's crucial to use the proper title while speaking to members of the royal family because Brunei is an absolute monarchy, and inappropriate use might be uncomfortable. The heir apparent and crown prince, styled as Duli Yang Teramat Mulia Paduka Seri (His Royal Highness), is officially known as Pengiran Muda Mahkota (Crown Prince); A blood prince is officially known as Pengiran Muda (Prince); their names are styled differently: If they do not have additional titles, the Sultan's sons are addressed as Duli Yang Teramat Mulia Paduka Seri (His Royal Highness); The Pengiran Muda Mahkota's sons are addressed as Yang Teramat Mulia (His Royal Highness).

=== China ===
Before Qin dynasty, prince (in the sense of royal family member) had no special title. Princes of the Zhou dynasty were specifically referred to as Wangzi (王子) and Wangsun (王孫), which mean "son of the king" and "grandson of the king," while princes of the vassal states were referred to as Gongzi (公子) and Gongsun (公孫), which mean "son of the lord" and "grandson of the lord," respectively. Sons of the vassals may receive nobility titles like Jun (君), Qing (卿), Daifu (大夫) and Shi (仕).

Since Han dynasty, royal family members were entitled Wang (王, lit. King), the former highest title which was then replaced by Huang Di (皇帝, lit. Emperor). Since Western Jin, the Wang rank was divided into two ranks, Qin Wang (親王, lit. King of the Blood) and Jun Wang (郡王, lit. King of the Commandery). Only family of the Emperor can be entitled Qin Wang, so prince is usually translated as Qin Wang, e.g. 菲利普親王 (Prince Philip). For the son of the ruler, prince is usually translated as Huang Zi (皇子, lit. Son of the Emperor) or Wang Zi (王子 lit., Son of the King), e.g. 查爾斯王子 (Prince Charles).

During the Three Kingdoms period, some emperors of the Cao Wei dynasty enfeoffed certain vassals with the title of Xian Wang (县王 lit., King of the County) a title which was lower than Jun Wang.

As a title of nobility, prince can be translated as Qin Wang according to tradition, Da Gong (大公, lit., Grand Duke) if one want to emphasize that it is a very high rank but below the King (Wang), or just Zhu Hou (诸侯, lit. princes) which refers to princes of all ranks in general. For example, 摩納哥親王 (Prince of Monaco).

=== Japan ===
In Japan, the title Kōshaku (公爵) was used as the highest title of Kazoku (華族 Japanese modern nobility) before the present constitution. Kōshaku, however, is more commonly translated as "Duke" to avoid confusion with the following royal ranks in the Imperial Household: Shinnō (親王 literally, Prince of the Blood); Naishinnō (内親王 lit., Princess of the Blood in her own right); and Shinnōhi 親王妃 lit., Princess Consort); or Ō (王 lit., Prince); Jyo-Ō (女王 lit., Princess (in her own right)); and Ōhi (王妃 lit., Princess Consort). The former is the higher title of a male member of the Imperial family while the latter is the lower.

=== Korea ===
In the Joseon Dynasty, the title "Prince" was used for the king's male-line descendants. The title was divided into two: the king's legitimate son used the title daegun (대군, 大君, literally "grand prince"), but any other male royals used the title gun (군, 君, lit. "prince"). These included the descendants of the king up to the grandsons of illegitimate sons of the king and the crown prince, and up to the great grandsons of daeguns, with other royals being able to be named gun if they reached the second rank. But the title of gun wasn't limited to the royal family. It was also granted as an honorary title to the king's father-in-law and to gongsin (공신, 功臣, lit. "servant of merit") and was only conditionally hereditary for gongsins.

As noble titles no longer exist in modern Korea, the English word "Prince" is now usually translated as wangja (왕자, 王子, lit. "king's son"), referring to princes from non-Korean royal families. Princes and principalities in continental Europe are almost always confused with dukes and duchies in Korean speech, both being translated as gong (공, 公, lit. "duke") and gongguk (공국, 公國, lit. "duchy").

=== Sri Lanka ===
The title 'Prince' was used for the King's son in Sinhalese generation in Sri Lanka.

=== India ===
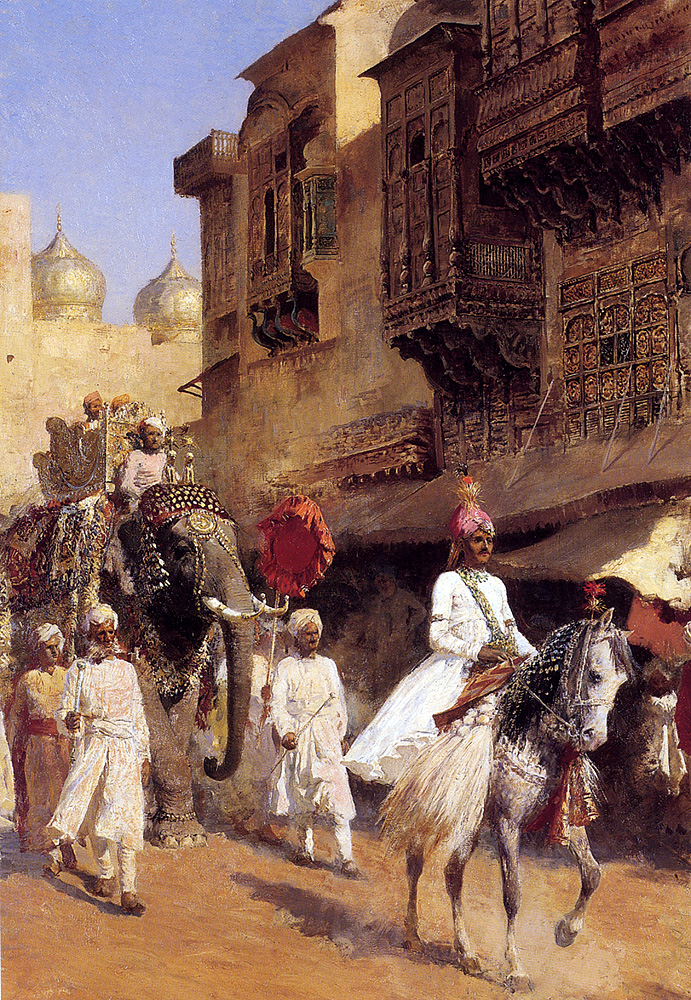
Indian Prince And Parade Ceremony (by Edwin Lord Weeks)

In the former Empire of India, during the British Colonial Era, the title of a Prince was conferred upon by the Emperor to the hereditary Indian rulers of the numerous principalities of varying sizes in the empire called "princely states", who ruled their territories in the name of the Emperor of India, who was also simultaneously the Monarch of the United Kingdom and the Dominions. They acknowledged the Emperor as their imperial sovereign till the empire's dissolution in 1947 and subsequently acceded to the newly formed Union of India and the Dominion of Pakistan between 1947 and 1949.

=== Indochina ===
See Cambodia, Vietnam, and Laos

=== Philippines ===
See Principalia, the Sultanate of Maguindanao and the Sultanate of Sulu.

=== Thailand ===
In Thailand (formerly Siam), the title of Prince was divided into three classes depending on the rank of their mothers. Those who were born of a king and had a royal mother (a queen or princess consort) are titled Chaofa Chai (Thai: เจ้าฟ้าชาย: literally, "Male Celestial Lord"). Those born of a king and a commoner, or children of Chaofas and royal consorts, are tilted Phra Ong Chao (พระองค์เจ้า). The children of Chaofas and commoners, or children of Phra Ong Chaos, are titled Mom Chao (หม่อมเจ้า), abbreviated as M.C. (or ม.จ.).

=== African traditions ===
A Western model was sometimes copied by emancipated colonial regimes (e.g. Bokassa I's short-lived Central-African Empire in Napoleonic fashion). Otherwise, most of the styles for members of ruling families do not lend themselves well to English translation. Nonetheless, in general the princely style has gradually replaced the colonialist title of "chief", which does not particularly connote dynastic rank to Westerners, e.g. Swazi Royal Family and Zulu Royal Family. Nominally ministerial chiefly titles, such as the Yoruba Oloye and the Zulu InDuna, still exist as distinct titles in kingdoms all over Africa.

== Title in religious traditions ==
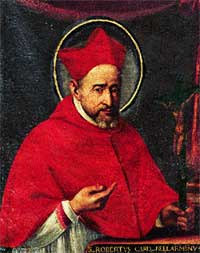
Saint Robert Cardinal Bellarmine was a prince of the Roman Catholic Church during his lifetime.

In states with an element of theocracy, this can affect princehood in several ways, such as the style of the ruler (e.g. with a secondary title meaning son or servant of a named divinity), but also the mode of succession (even reincarnation and recognition).

=== Christianity ===
Certain religious offices may be considered of princely rank, or imply comparable temporal rights. Pope, Hereditary Prince-Cardinals, Cardinals, Prince-Lord Bishops, Prince Bishops, Lord Bishops, Prince-Provost, and Prince-abbots are referred to as Princes of the Church.

Also, in Christianity, Jesus Christ is sometimes referred to as the Prince of Peace. Other titles for Jesus Christ are Prince of Princes, Prince of the Covenant, Prince of Life, and Prince of the Kings of the Earth. Further, Satan is popularly titled the Prince of Darkness; and in the Christian faith he is also referred to as the Prince of this World and the Prince of the Power of the Air. Another title for Satan, not as common today but apparently so in approximately 30 A.D. by the Pharisees of the day, was the title Prince of the Devils. Prince of Israel, Prince of the Angels, and Prince of Light are titles given to the Archangel Michael. Some Christian churches also believe that since all Christians, like Jesus Christ, are children of God, then they too are princes and princesses of Heaven. Saint Peter, a disciple of Jesus, is also known as the Prince of the Apostles.

=== Islam ===
- Arabian tradition since the caliphate: In several monarchies it remains customary to use the title sheikh (in itself below princely rank) for all members of the royal family. In families (often reigning dynasties) which claim descent from Muhammad, this is expressed in either of a number of titles (supposing different exact relations): sayid, sharif; these are retained even when too remote from any line of succession to be a member of any dynasty.
- In Saudi Arabia the title of Emir is used in role of prince for all members of the House of Saud.
- In Iraq, the direct descendants of previous Emirs from the largest tribes, who ruled the kingdoms before modern statehood, use the title of Sheikh or Prince as the progeny of royalty.
- In the Ottoman Empire, the sovereign of imperial rank (incorrectly known in the west as (Great) sultan) was styled padishah with a host of additional titles, reflecting his claim as political successor to the various conquered states. Princes of the blood, male, were given the style Şehzade.
- Persia (Iran)—Princes as members of a royal family, are referred to by the title Shahzadeh, meaning "descendant of the king". Since the word zadeh could refer to either a male or female descendant, Shahzadeh had the parallel meaning of "princess" as well. Princes can also be sons of provincial kings (Khan) and the title referring to them would be the title of Khanzadeh. Princes as people who got a title from the King are called "Mirza", diminutive of "Amir Zadeh" (King's Son).
- In Indian Muslim dynasties, the most common titles were Mirza (from Amirzada) and Shahzada; while Nawabzada and Sahibzada were also given to younger blood princes.
- In Kazakh Khanate the title Sultan was used for lords from a ruling dynasty (direct descendants of Genghis Khan), that gives them a right to be elected as khan, as an experienced ruler; and an honorific tore, another name for the clan, (ru:Торе (род)) for ordinary members of a ruling dynasty.

== See also ==
- Crown prince
- Grand prince
- British prince
- Emir
- Fürst
- Prince Charming
- Prince consort and Princess consort
- Prince du sang
- Prince-elector and Prince regent
- Prince of the Church
- Rajkumar
- Taizi
- Yuvraj
- Principality and Princely state
- List of fictional princes
- Lists of princes
