= Adoption in ancient Rome =

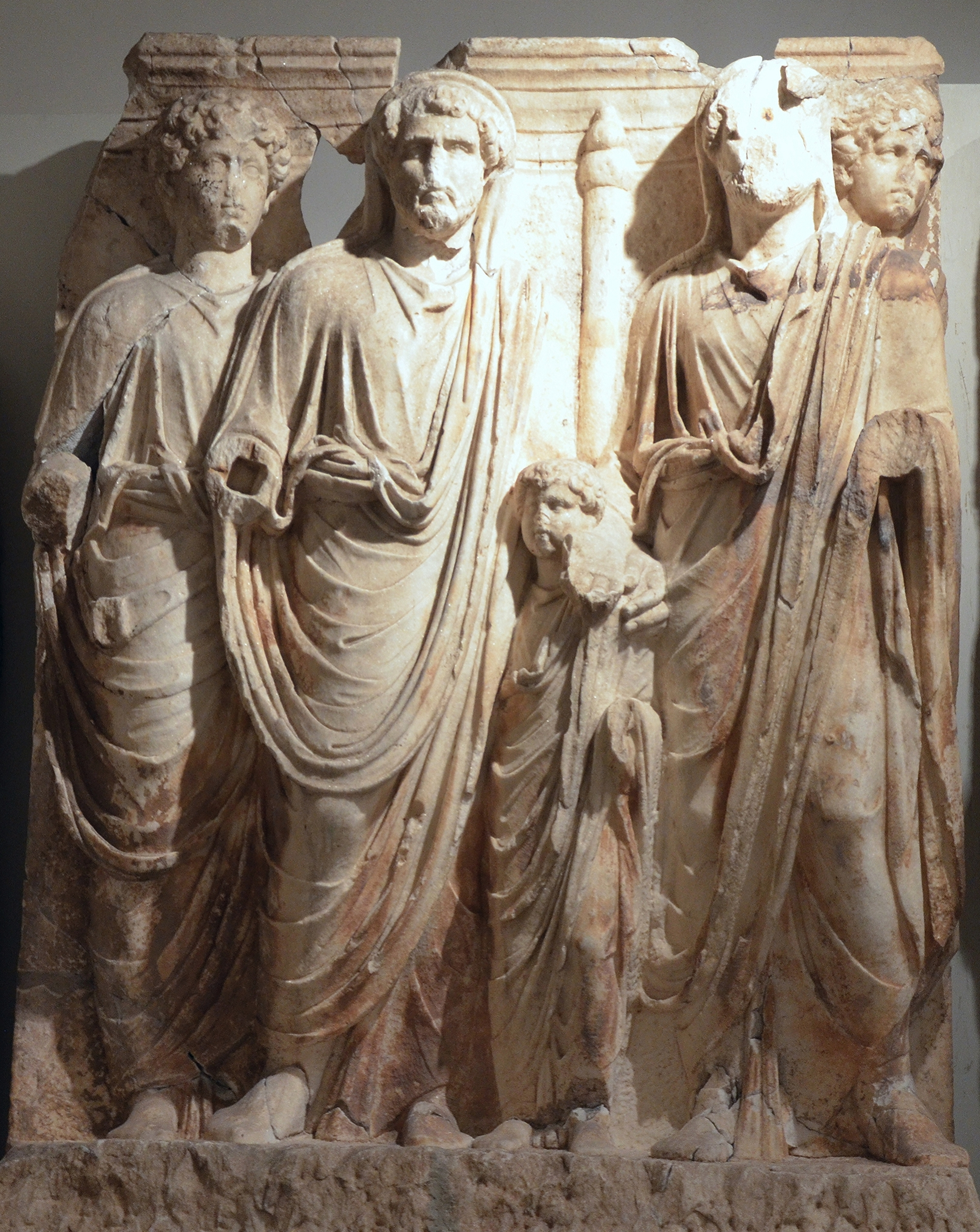
Great Antonine Altar depicting imperial succession through adoption: Hadrian (right) adopted Antoninus Pius (center left), who in turn adopted the 17-year-old Marcus Aurelius (left) and the 8-year-old Lucius Verus; the head over Hadrian's left shoulder may represent the guardian genius of Aelius Verus, Lucius's late father

Adoption in ancient Rome was primarily a legal procedure for transferring paternal power (potestas) to ensure succession in the male line within Roman patriarchal society. The Latin word adoptio refers broadly to "adoption", which was of two kinds: the transferral of potestas over a free person from one head of household to another; and adrogatio, when the adoptee had been acting sui iuris as a legal adult but assumed the status of unemancipated son for purposes of inheritance. Adoptio was a longstanding part of Roman family law pertaining to paternal responsibilities such as perpetuating the value of the family estate and ancestral rites (sacra), which were concerns of the Roman property-owning classes and cultural elite. During the Principate, adoption became a way to ensure imperial succession.

In contrast to modern adoption, Roman adoptio was neither designed nor intended to build emotionally satisfying families and support childrearing. Among all social classes, childless couples or those who wanted to expand the size of their families instead might foster children. Evidence is meager for the adoptio of young children for purposes other than securing a male heir, and probably would have been employed mostly by former slaves legitimating the status of their own children born into slavery or outside a legally valid marriage.

Roman women could own, inherit, and control property as citizens, and therefore could exercise prerogatives of the paterfamilias pertaining to ownership and inheritance. They played an increasingly significant role in succession and the inheritance of property from the 2nd century BC through the 2nd century AD, but as an instrument for transferring paternal potestas, adoption was mainly a male-gendered practice.

== Social and legal context ==
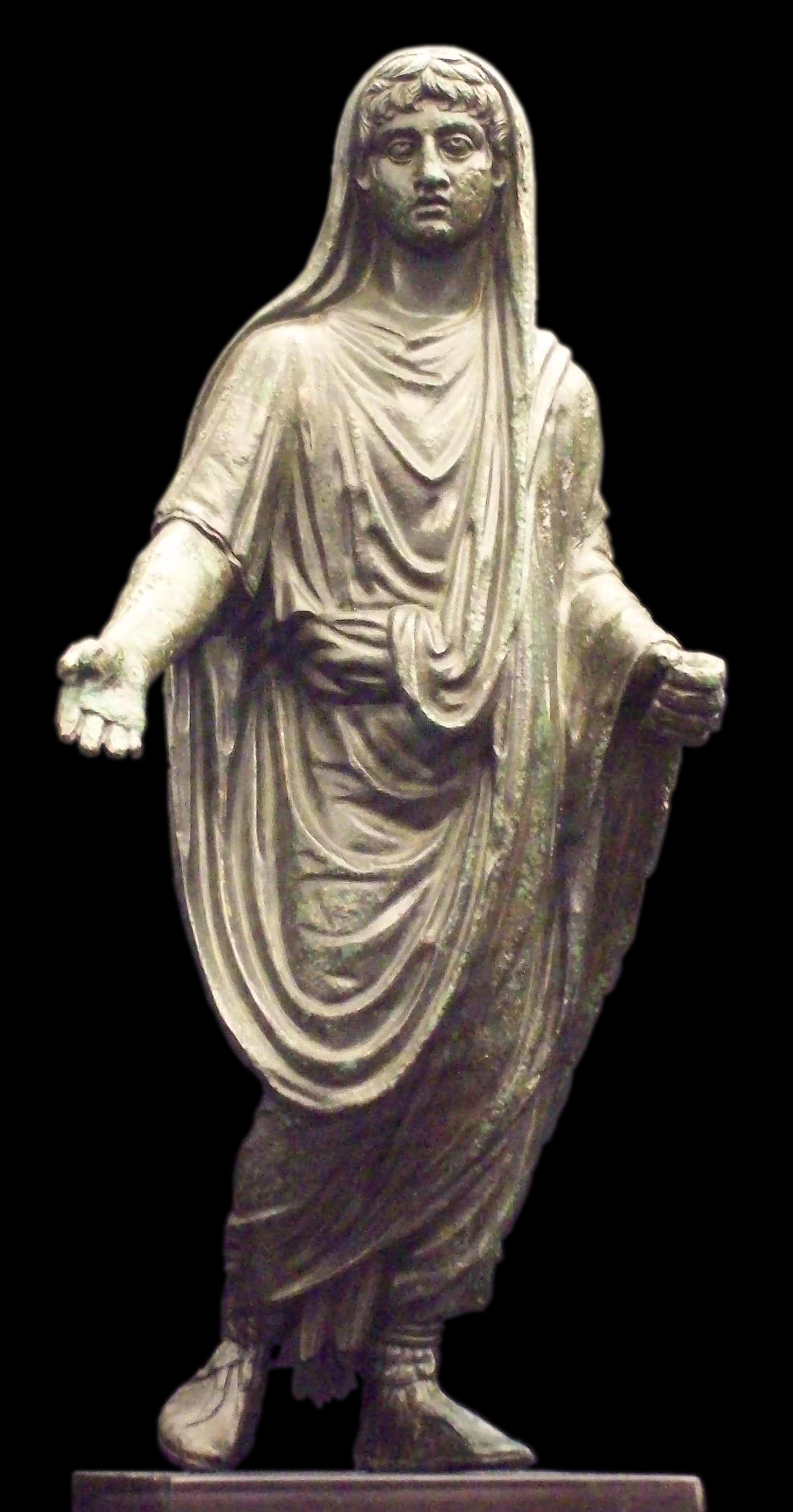
A family genius depicted as a paterfamilias (1st century)

Formal adoption was practiced primarily for financial, social, and political purposes among the property-owning classes. Free working people for whom these interests were minimal had little need of the cumbersome legal procedure and instead fostered if they wished to rear children. For the Romans, kinship was "biologically based but not biologically determined", and procedures such as adoption and divorce gave them greater latitude to restructure their families than was allowed in Christian Europe. Cicero said that adoption was an accepted way to ensure the hereditas (transmission) of three aspects of Roman family continuity: the family name (nomen), wealth (pecunia), and religious rites (sacra). Adoption was appropriate for a man who had no legitimate children, but if there were already legitimate heirs, adoption risked diluting their inheritance and the social status that came with it. Romans tended to prefer small families of two or three children for this reason, though premodern rates of neonatal and childhood mortality, along with other factors, could be an unsought brake on family size that jeopardized the family line. In adopting an adult heir, the father "could see what he was getting".

Adoption was carried out by the male who was head of his family, the paterfamilias, and his adopting did not make his wife a mother. Nor was marriage required; an adult bachelor could adopt in order to pass along his family name and potestas, as could a citizen eunuch (Latin spado).

=== The adoptee ===
A close relative was preferred as the adoptee, and a paterfamilias might adopt a grandson, especially if the grandson's father was not in the line of succession. The grandson might be his daughter's son, or the pater might have removed the boy's father from succession by emancipating him. One common pattern in Roman adoption was for a woman's childless brother to adopt one of her sons. A brother or cousin on the father's side might relinquish potestas over a son to provide a childless man with an adoptive heir. A pater who had no sons might adopt his daughter's husband to strengthen family lineage, but to avoid technical incest, he would first need to emancipate his daughter so that she was no longer legally a part of the family – the adoption would otherwise create a brother-sister relationship that Roman law regarded as consanguines, the same as blood ties. Adoption of a stepson from the wife's previous marriage was another strategy, if the stepson had no children; after adoption, his offspring would enter the line as grandchildren of the adopting paterfamilias.

The adoptee did not have to be a relative. Romans placed a high value on the social bonds of friendship (amicitia), and a childless man might adopt a friend or friend's son. Fostering was preferred to adopting children of "low" birth or unknown parentage, and in Roman Egypt it was unlawful to adopt a male foundling. The paterfamilias generally transmitted his estate to an adoptee of his own rank, or the adoptee acquired the social rank of the adoptive family, with some exceptions.

==== Freedmen adoptees ====
Most often adoption would have been a lateral move or a modest boost to the adoptee's standing and wealth, but a freedman could also be adopted. A slave might even be simultaneously manumitted and adopted by his former master, who became both his patron (patronus) and his "father". The adoption of a freedman placed his property under the control of his new paterfamilias; it no longer belonged to him, but it would return to him along with the rest of his inheritance. The choice of a freedman for adoption may have been motivated most often by gaining access to his resources rather than securing lineage.

In the early Republic, a freedman through adoption gained the same status as the freeborn citizen who freed him. By the time of Tiberius, the adopted freedman was regarded as an unemancipated son in matters of family law but held only the rights of freedpersons otherwise. Legislation that more closely regulated the varied statuses of liberti left the adoptee as a freedman who could not, for example, marry into the senatorial order even if he was adopted by a senator.

=== Political adoptions and legal dodges ===
In the late Republican era, Publius Clodius Pulcher famously subverted the usual course of "adopting up", surrendering his patrician status and becoming a nominal plebeian in order to qualify for the office of tribune. Plebeians had adopted patricians before, but the reasons are not always clear and were not always political. Cicero criticized the adrogatio of Clodius as solely politically motivated, and Clodius was emancipated immediately after he had achieved his aim. Around the same time, a nominal adoption allowed Publius Cornelius Lentulus Spinther, son of the consul of 57 BC, to take a place in the College of Augurs by getting around the rule against having two members from the same gens. The adoption seems to have been entirely fictive, since there is no evidence he ever made any use of the nomenclature of the Manlius Toquatus who adopted him. Cicero's own patrician son-in-law, Publius Cornelius Dolabella, followed the path of Clodius in becoming a tribune by having himself adopted by a plebeian Cornelius.

Augustan legislation that granted privileges to fathers with multiple children and disadvantaged the childless also prompted adoptions of convenience. Adoption for this purpose became enough of an issue that by the time of Nero a senatorial decree had tried to block legal dodges. The historian Tacitus indicates that fictitious or "fake adoption" (simulata adoptio) could be detected by rapid emancipation once the benefit was realized – benefits including priority in the selection of provincial governors or candidates for office for men who had met the fatherhood quota. The restrictions under the decree are not preserved in full, but a request for adrogatio could be denied if the would-be adoptive father already had children or was under the age of sixty and assumed able to procreate.

== Forms of adoption ==
Adoptio had some commonalities with emancipatio, the procedure by which an adult son was released from paternal potestas – regardless of age, Roman men and women remained in effect legal minors as long as their father was alive unless emancipated. The father's relinquishing of potestas over the son in both cases took the form of a fictive sale, based on an archaic provision of the Twelve Tables (mid-5th century BC) that a son sold three times was thereafter released from his father's legal control.

=== Adrogatio ===
Adrogatio differed from adoptio in that the person adopted was already sui iuris; another father did not have to surrender his potestas, and rather than extirpating the adoptee's previous family line, the two family lines were merged. An adrogated adoptee was likely to have inherited from the natural father whose death had left him sui iuris, consolidating two patrimonies. Ownership of anything belonging to the adoptee was legally transferred to the paterfamilias, though it was set aside as peculium, a fund or property for use by an unemancipated son or slave. When Tiberius was adopted in adulthood by Augustus, he thereafter observed this longstanding legal requirement by crediting any property he received through inheritance to the peculium rather than his private ownership.

The development of adrogatio as a form of adoption is bound up with an early procedure for making a will that required the approval of the comitia calata, an assembly of the Roman people. Upon the testator's death, the named heir was in effect adopted by the deceased. The legislative act of adrogation was carried out by thirty magisterial lictors summoned by the Pontifex Maximus. Because adoption law developed to support the particular institutions of Roman society, adrogatio could take place only in the city of Rome until the reign of Diocletian in the late third century.

Adrogation of female adoptees became possible through imperial rescript in the Antonine era (AD 138–192), and under exceptional circumstances a woman could adopt in the same way. In one documented case from the 3rd century, a woman whose sons had died was permitted to adopt her stepson. Since a woman did not transfer paternal potestas, however, adoption accomplished little that could not be achieved through exercising her rights under inheritance law.

=== Testamentary adoption ===
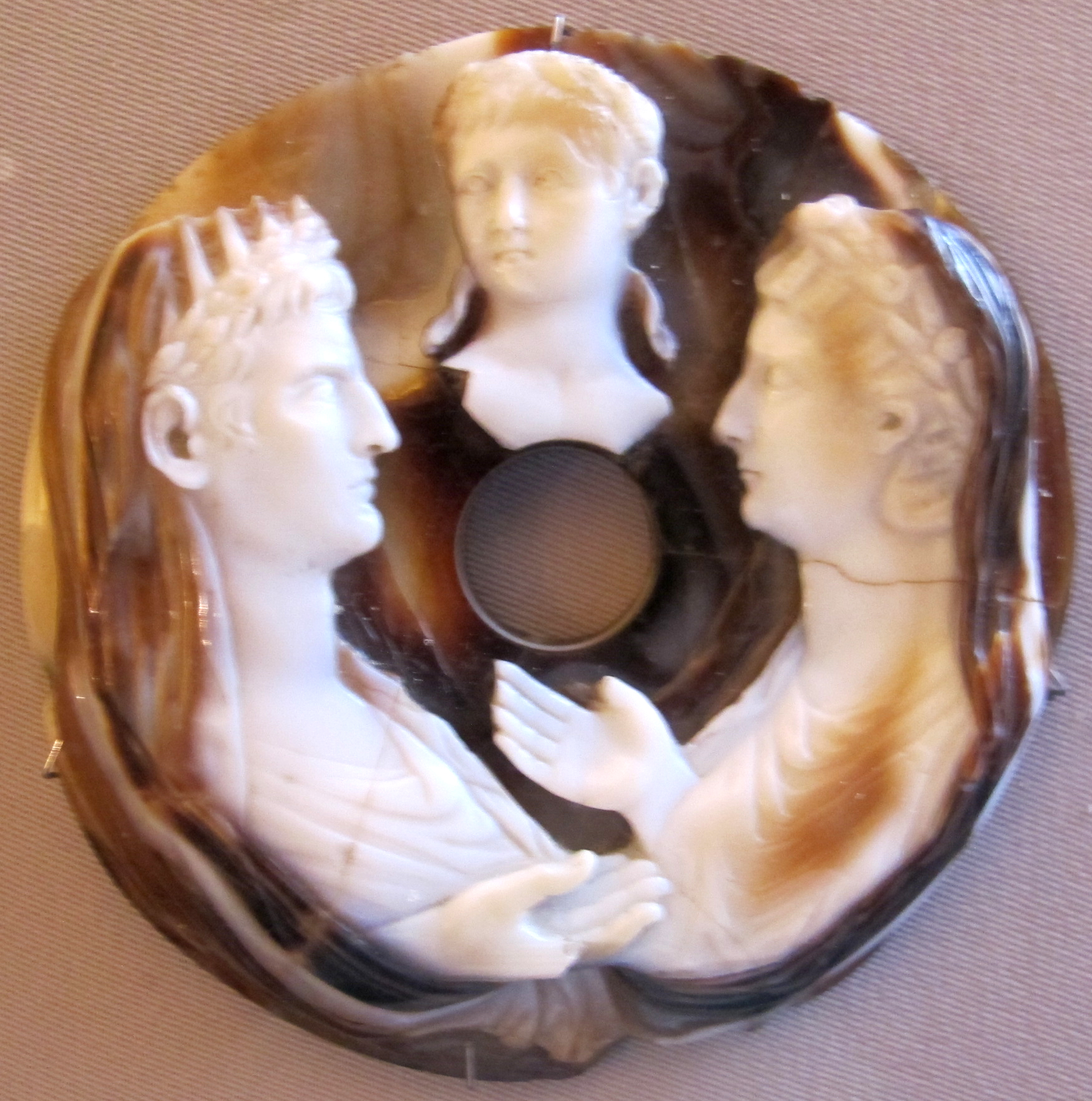
Cameo (1st century) depicting Augustus, Livia, and Nero as a child

Testamentary adoption became more common during the late Republic. Octavian, the future Augustus, was adopted in this way by his maternal great-uncle Julius Caesar. Although adoptio was a practice aimed at furthering the succession of male privileges, both men and women could in effect "adopt" by passing along their property in a will with the condition that the heir carry on the family name (condicio nominis ferendi). The role of women in passing property along the family line became "increasingly important". Technically, this was not adoption but the "institution of an heir." The advantage of this arrangement was that the testator did not have to assume patriarchal responsibilities for the adoptee while he was alive but had assured the continuity of the family name, rites, and estate after his death; the testamentary adoptee did not surrender his own status as a pater as he would in adrogation but received the benefits of inheritance.

Adoption was also the means by which married women could become part of their husband's family. From the late Republic through the Principate, most Roman women married sine manu, meaning that they remained part of their birth family and did not submit to their husband's potestas. Livia, the wife of Augustus, outlived him, and only upon his death did testamentary adoption make her a part of the Julian family.

=== Legitimation ===
Illegitimacy does not appear to have carried much stigma in Roman society before the time of Constantine I, as many forms of Roman marriage existed, some rather loosely defined, along with quasi-marital unions such as contubernium among slaves and monogamous concubinage (concubinatus). Birth outside marriage was primarily at issue in matters of inheritance but was not a clearly defined status with debilities in law, as a principle of customary international law (ius gentium) was that a child took its status from the mother. A freedwoman whose male partner remained enslaved might find it advantageous to assert that her child was fatherless and not conceived during her own servitude, so as to ensure the child's freeborn status. It was unusual for freeborn persons to legitimate a child born outside a legally valid marriage, and typically a man would not adopt his illegitimate child unless he had no other heirs. The adoptee could be ingenuus (freeborn) or a freedman, and might be a child resulting from concubinatus, though children were not especially desired from these unions.

Provisions for retroactive legitimation became more capacious in late antiquity as family law was adapted during the Christianization of the Roman Empire, in particular under Constantine and Justinian.

In the Classical period, legitimation might have been more common among former slaves. Since slaves lacked personhood under Roman law, they could neither contract a valid marriage nor institute an heir by means of a will. However, the quasi-marital union of contubernium was available to heterosexual slave couples with the owner's approval, and expressed an intent to marry if both parties gained rights of marriage and succession upon manumission. Because a male slave did not possess the standing to assert patriarchal potestas, the child of an enslaved father was spurius, one whose father could not be legally identified as such—that is, illegitimate. Since the child's status was determined by the mother's, if a woman was manumitted before her partner and conceived a child with him after that, the child was spurius but freeborn; unlike freeborn children from a legal marriage, however, the child was born sui iuris, emancipated from the potestas of an adult male. If the father was later manumitted through a procedure that granted him full citizenship, he could legitimate his child through adrogatio.

== Imperial succession ==
Many Roman emperors came to power through adoption, either because their predecessors had no natural sons, or simply to ensure a smooth transition for the most capable candidate.

=== The Julio-Claudian dynasty ===
Julio Claudian Family Tree

Augustus, as he was known after he became the first Roman emperor, was adopted into the gens Julia in the will of his great uncle, Julius Caesar. He inherited Caesar's money, name, and auctoritas.

As Augustus's central role in the Principate solidified, it became increasingly important for him to designate an heir. He first adopted his daughter Julia's three sons by Marcus Agrippa, renaming them Gaius Caesar, Lucius Caesar, and Agrippa Caesar. After the former two died young and the latter was exiled, Augustus adopted his stepson, Tiberius Claudius Nero, on the condition that he adopt his own nephew, Germanicus (who was also Augustus's great nephew by blood). Tiberius succeeded Augustus, and after Tiberius's death, Germanicus's son Caligula became emperor.

Claudius adopted his stepson Lucius Domitius Ahenobarbus, who changed his name to Nero Claudius Caesar and succeeded Claudius as the emperor, Nero.

=== The adoptive emperors ===
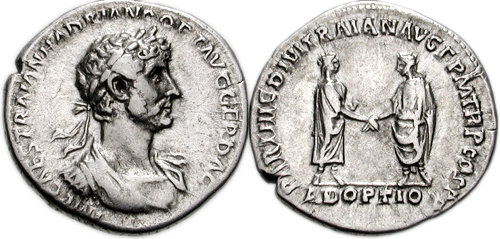
Denarius issued under Hadrian; the reverse shows him joining hands with Trajan with the legend ADOPTIO

The Nerva-Antonine dynasty was also united by a series of adoptions. Nerva adopted the popular military leader Trajan. Trajan in turn took Publius Aelius Hadrianus as his protégé and, although the legitimacy of the process is debatable, Hadrian claimed to have been adopted and took the name Caesar Traianus Hadrianus when he became emperor.

Hadrian adopted Lucius Ceionius Commodus, who changed his name to Lucius Aelius Caesar but predeceased Hadrian. Hadrian then adopted Titus Aurelius Fulvus Boionius Arrius Antoninus, on condition that Antoninus in turn adopt both the natural son of the late Lucius Aelius and a promising young nephew of his wife. They ruled as Antoninus Pius, Lucius Verus and Marcus Aurelius respectively.

Niccolò Machiavelli described them as The Five Good Emperors and attributed their success to having been chosen for the role:

From the study of this history we may also learn how a good government is to be established; for while all the emperors who succeeded to the throne by birth, except Titus, were bad, all were good who succeeded by adoption, as in the case of the five from Nerva to Marcus. But as soon as the empire fell once more to the heirs by birth, its ruin recommenced.

This run of adoptive emperors came to an end when Marcus Aurelius named his biological son, Commodus, as his heir.

Adoption never became the official method of designating a successor, in part because Roman identity was based on citizenship with a visceral rejection of hereditary kingship. During the Principate, so called from Augustus's styling of himself as princeps (first among equals, in the manner of the princeps senatus), emperors consolidated their power by making use of the institutions of Republican Rome rather than overthrowing them outright. Augustus's early intentions seem to have been to apprentice and promote a successor on the basis of merit, but his longevity instead created an apparatus of centralized power from which his status as a private citizen could no longer be extricated. His fashioning of himself as "father of his country" enabled the transferral of his power over the Roman people in the same way that a paterfamilias of a family estate was bound to transfer his potestas whether or not the available successor was fully meritorious. A major transition in the means of imperial succession marks the periodization of Roman Imperial history into the Dominate, when Diocletian replaced adoption with the consortium imperii, designation of an heir by appointing him partner in imperium.

== Bibliography ==
- Berger, Adolf (1953). Encyclopedic Dictionary of Roman Law (1991 ed.). American Philological Society.
- Buchwitz, Wolfram (2023). "Giving and Taking: The Effects of Roman Inheritance Law on the Social Position of Slaves". In Schermaier, Martin (ed.). The Position of Roman Slaves: Social Realities and Legal Differences. Dependency and Slavery Studies. Vol. 6. De Gruyter. pp. 165–186.
- Buckland, William Warwick (1908). The Roman Law of Slavery: The Condition of the Slave in Private Law from Augustus to Justinian. Cambridge University Press.
- Corbier, Mireille (1991). "Divorce and Adoption as Familial Strategies". In Rawson, Beryl (ed.). Marriage, Divorce, and Children in Ancient Rome (1996 pb ed.). Oxford University Press.
- Evans-Grubbs, Judith (1993). "'Marriage More Shameful Than Adultery': Slave-Mistress Relationships, 'Mixed Marriages', and Late Roman Law". Phoenix. 47 (2): 236–257. JSTOR 1088581.
- Gardner, Jane F. (1986). Women in Roman Law and Society (2009 ed.). Taylor & Francis.
- Gardner, Jane F. (1989). "The Adoption of Roman Freedmen". Phoenix. 43 (3): 236–257. JSTOR 1088460.
- Gardner, Jane F. (1998). "Sexing a Roman: Imperfect Men in Roman Law". In Foxhall, Lin; Salmon, John (eds.). When Men Were Men: Masculinity, Power, and Identity in Classical Antiquity. Routledge. pp. 136–152.
- Levick, Barbara (1966). "Drusus Caesar and the Adoptions of A.D. 4". Latomus. 25 (2): 182–197. JSTOR 41524520.
- Lindsay, Hugh (2009). Adoption in the Roman World. Cambridge University Press.
- Lindsay, Hugh (2011). "Adoption and Heirship in Greece and Rome". In Rawson, Beryl (ed.). A Companion to Families in the Greek and Roman Worlds. Blackwell Companions to the Ancient World. Wiley Blackwell. pp. 346–360.
- Nowak, Maria (2015). "Ways of Describing Illegitimate Children vs. Their Legal Situation". Zeitschrift für Papyrologie und Epigraphik. 193: 207–218.
- Rawson, Beryl (1974). "Roman Concubinage and Other De Facto Marriages". Transactions of the American Philological Association. 104. JHUP: 279–305. doi:10.2307/2936094. JSTOR 2936094.
- Rawson, Beryl (1986). "The Roman Family". The Family in Ancient Rome: New Perspectives. Croom Helm. pp. 1–57.
- Saller, Richard P. (1994). Patriarchy, Property, and Death in the Roman Family. Cambridge Studies in Population, Economy and Society in Past Time. Cambridge University Press.
- Saller, Richard P. (1999). "Pater Familias, Mater Familias, and the Gendered Semantics of the Roman Household". Classical Philology. 94 (2): 182–197. JSTOR 270558.
- Tatum, W. Jeffrey (1999). The Patrician Tribune: Publius Clodius Pulcher. University of North Carolina Press.
- Treggiari, Susan (1981a). "Contubernales in CIL VI". Phoenix. 35 (1). CAC: 42–69. doi:10.2307/1087137. JSTOR 1087137.
- Treggiari, Susan (1981b). "Concubinae". Papers of the British School at Rome. 49: 59–81.
- Treggiari, Susan (2019). Servilia and Her Family. Oxford University Press.
