= Ephesus Museum =

Ephesus Museum may refer to:

- Ephesos Museum in Vienna
- Ephesus Archaeological Museum in Selçuk near Ephesus
