= Parthian Monument =

Monument with relief sculpture from the archaeological site of Ephesus

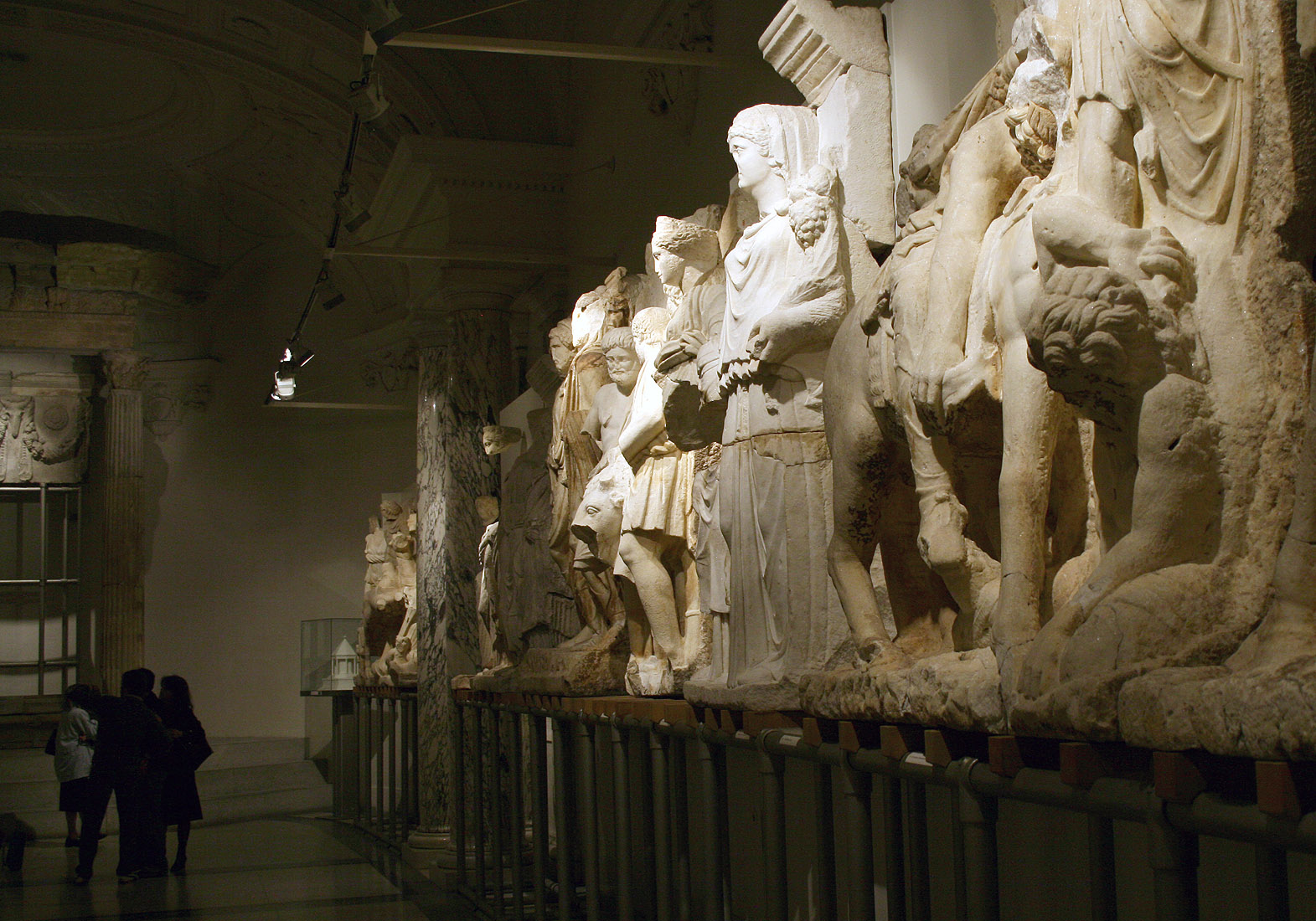
A part of the monument (Ephesos Museum)

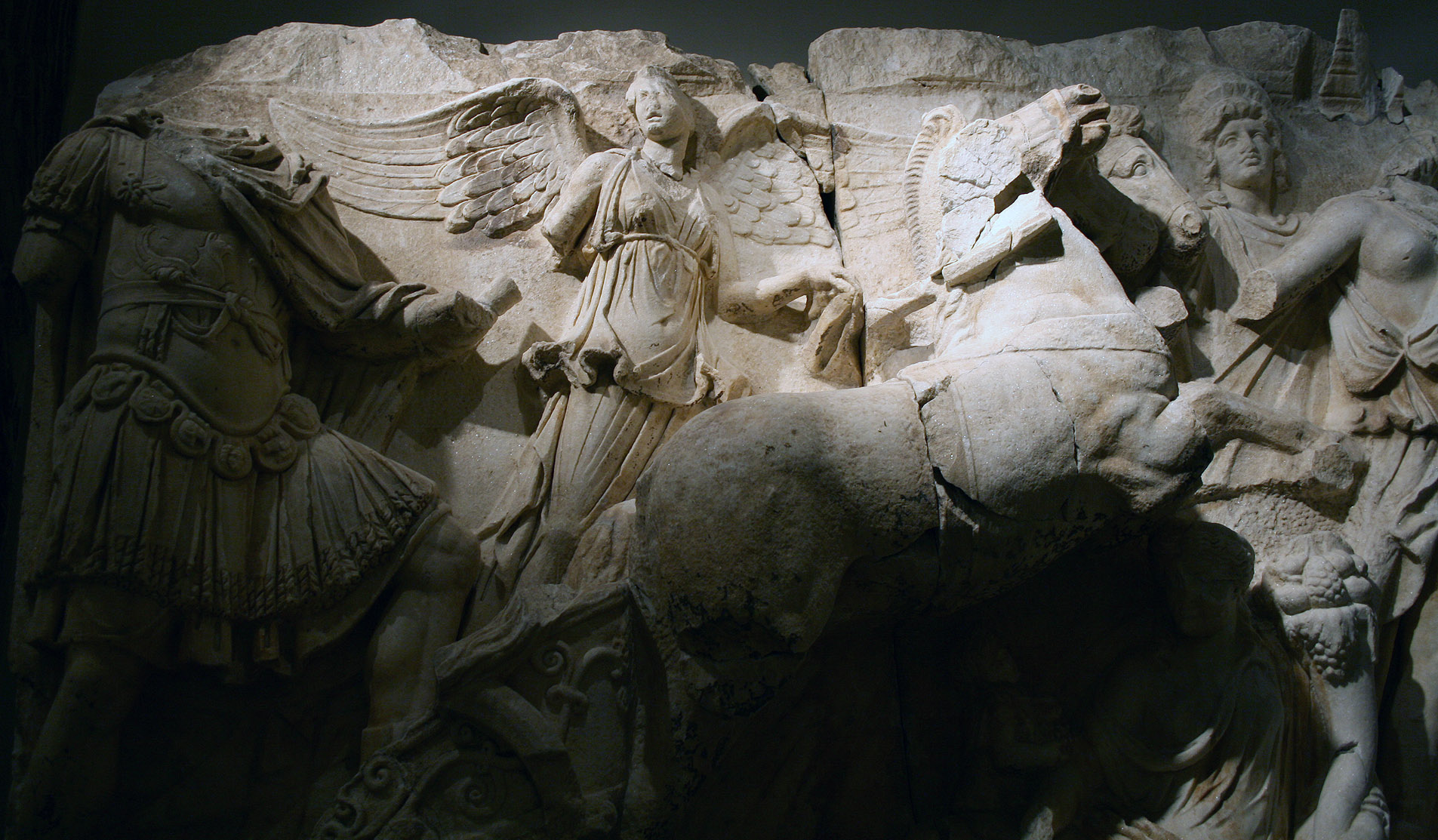
Detail – Apotheosis of the Emperors (Ephesos Museum)

The Parthian Monument was a 2nd-century Roman monument in Ephesus, of which only remnants survive, now housed in the Ephesos Museum, part of the Kunsthistorisches Museum in Vienna. It is named after reliefs discovered in 1903 in front of the Library of Celsus; these reliefs had later been reused as part of a fountain, with the Library's facade used to support the fountain. The monument includes the Great Antonine Altar.

The monument is usually thought to be a monument to a campaign against Parthia on the basis of the reliefs' dating, perhaps that of Lucius Verus in 161–166, which would date the monument to after 169. However, some scholars do not believe their subjects can be securely identified as Parthians.

== Bibliography ==
- (in German) Wolfgang Oberleitner: Das Partherdenkmal von Ephesos. Schriften des Kunsthistorischen Museums, 11. Kunsthistorisches Museum Wien, 2008
- (in German) Wolfgang Oberleitner: Das Partherdenkmal von Ephesos. In: Herwig Friesinger u. a. (Hrsg.): 100 Jahre österreichische Forschungen in Ephesos. Akten des Symposions Wien 1995. Österreichische Akademie der Wissenschaften, Wien 1999. pp. 619–631.
- (in German) Wilfried Seipel (ed.): Das Partherdenkmal von Ephesos. Akten des Kolloquiums, Wien, 27. - 28. April 2003. Schriften des Kunsthistorischen Museums 10. Kunsthistorisches Museum Wien, 2006.
