= Ephesos Museum =

Museum in Vienna, Austria

Coordinates: 48°12′20″N 16°21′55″E

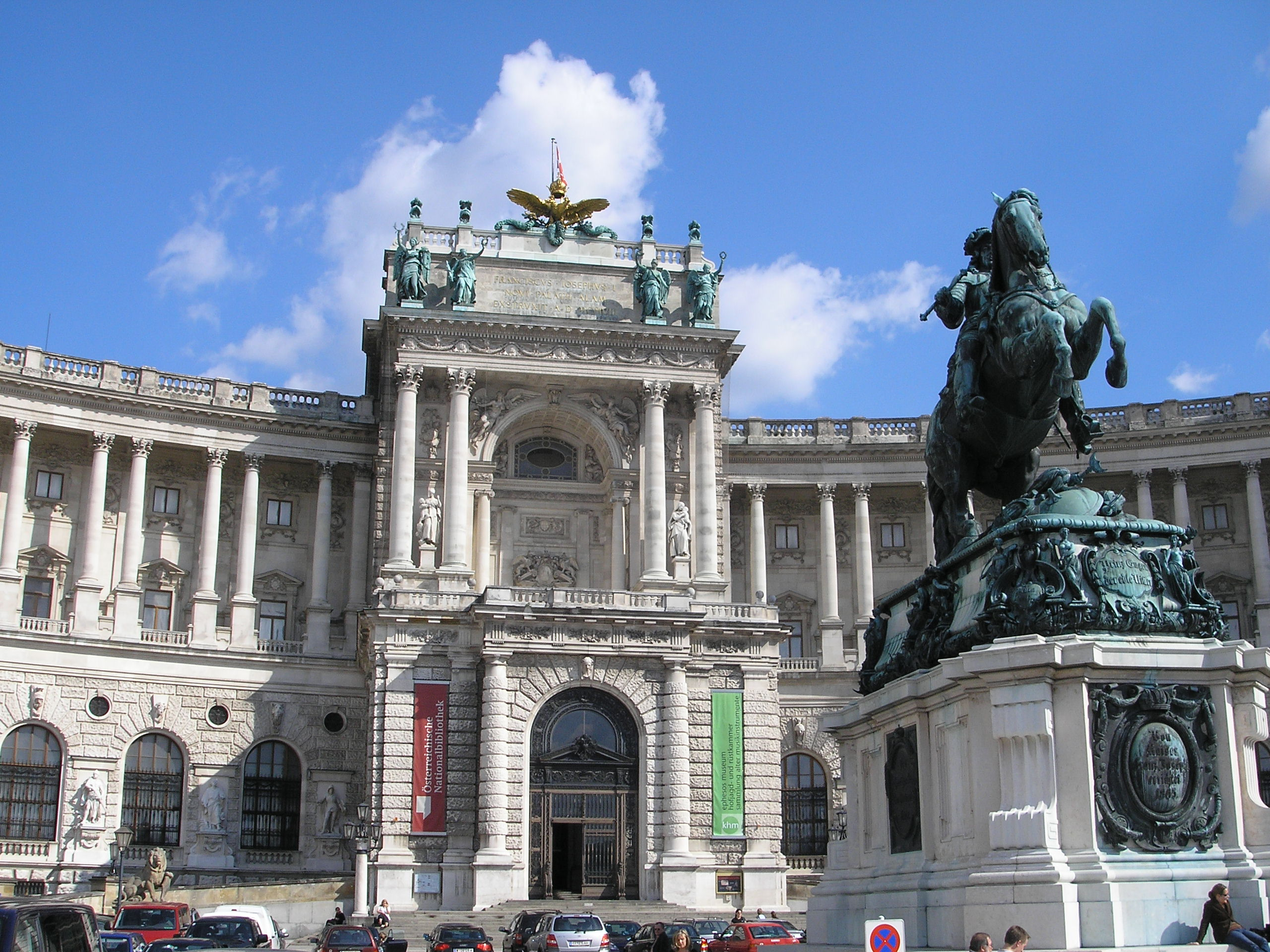
Hofburg, Vienna – the Neue Burg – Ephesos Museum and Austrian National Library

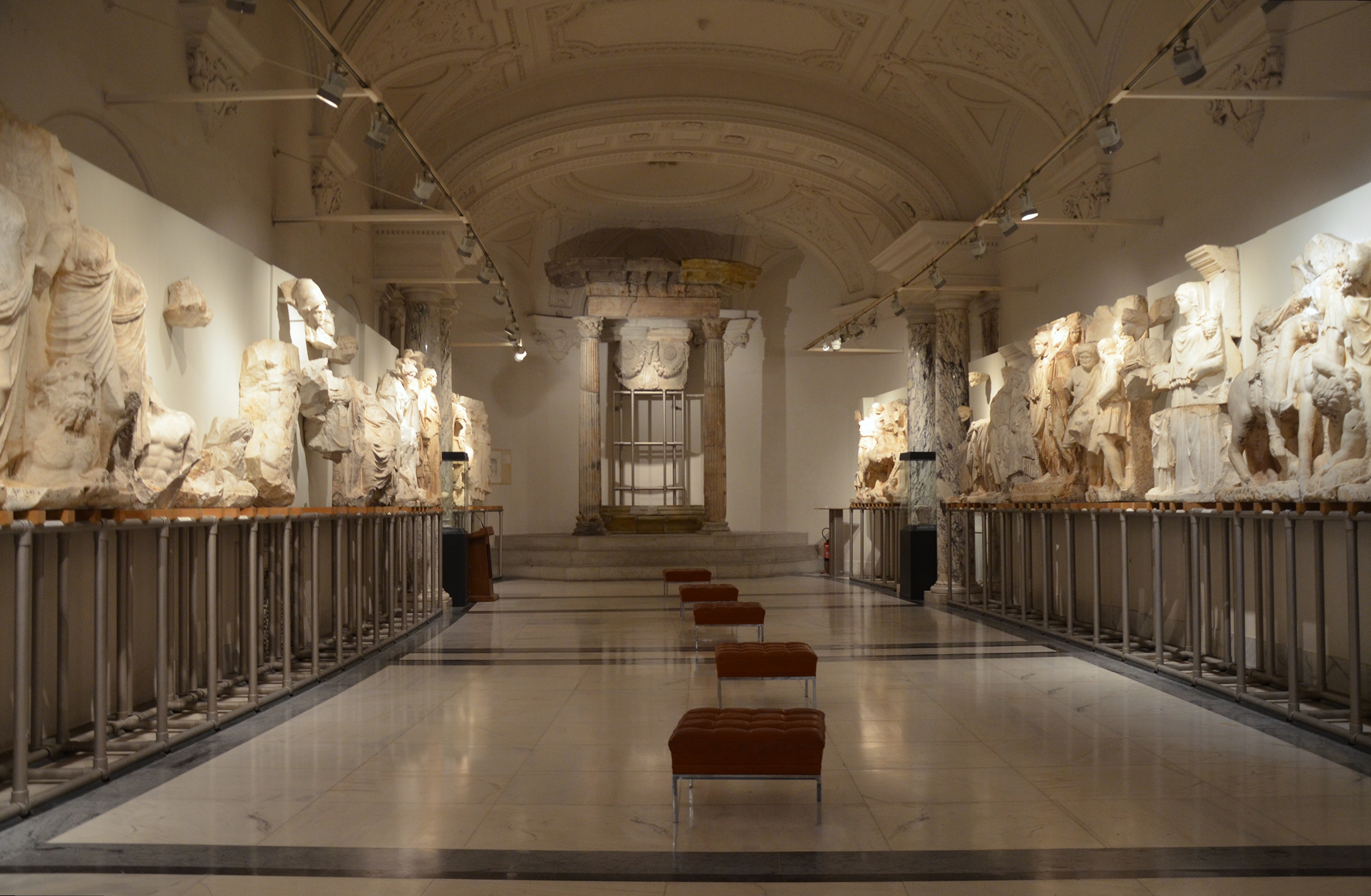
Interior of the Ephesos Museum

The Ephesos Museum in Vienna displays antiquities from the city of Ephesus (Greek: Έφεσος, German: Ephesos), in modern-day Turkey. Begun in the late 19th century, the collection includes original works of sculpture and architecture, and belongs to the Kunsthistorisches Museum.

Since 1978 the Ephesos Museum has had its own rooms in the Neue Burg. Before the museum was established, the present exhibits were provisionally displayed in various locations, including on occasion the Theseus Temple in the Volksgarten.

Lying on the Turkish Aegean coast, Ephesus was one of the largest cities of the ancient world and is now among the most popular tourist destinations in Turkey. The Austrian Archaeological Institute has been conducting research in the ruins of the city since 1895, interrupted only by the two world wars. The museum's collection began when Sultan Abdul Hamid II donated some of the archaeological findings to Emperor Franz Joseph I. Due to a change in Turkish law, no more artefacts have been sent to Vienna since 1907. Many other Ephesus artefacts are on display in the British Museum in London as well as in the Ephesus Archaeological Museum near the site of the excavation in Selçuk.

== The collection ==
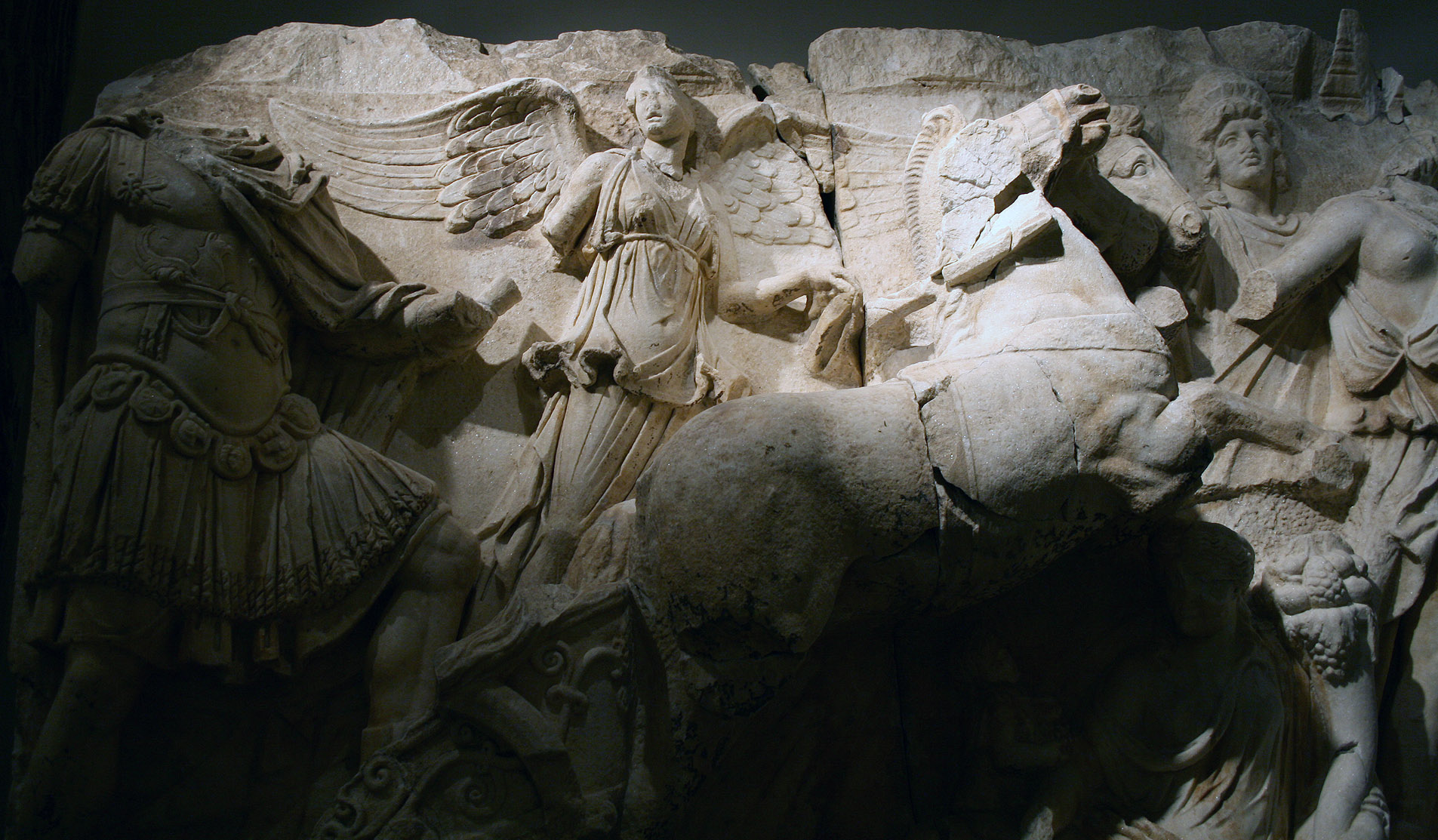
Parthian Monument (section: The Emperor's Apotheosis)

Between 1896 and 1906 a total of seven expeditions transported findings from Ephesus to Vienna. In the early 20th century these findings were exhibited in various places, including Belvedere Palace and the antiques collection of the Kunsthistorisches Museum. In 1911, a provisional exhibition in the Theseus Temple had to be discontinued because of damage to the exhibits. A selection of the items was once again exhibited in the Temple between 1934 and 1944. A number of Ephesean sculptures were displayed in the Neue Burg's colonnade from 1947 until 1978, when the entire collection finally received a permanent home in the newly founded Ephesos Museum.

The museum possesses remnants from the late-Classical Altar of Artemis, including a sculpture of an Amazon. Staircases lead from the entrance hall to a large chamber containing the frieze from the Parthian Monument of Ephesus. Other major exhibits include a model of ancient Ephesus on a scale of 1:500, and numerous sculptures including a bronze statue of an athlete. Also in the museum are architectural and sculptural cult relics from the Sanctuary of the Great Gods, on the Greek island of Samothrace.

Archaeological digs, with Austrian involvement, continue in Ephesus to this day. The scientific evaluation of the museum's stock is carried out in cooperation with the University of Vienna, the Austrian Academy of Sciences and the Austrian Archaeological Institute.

== Major exhibits ==
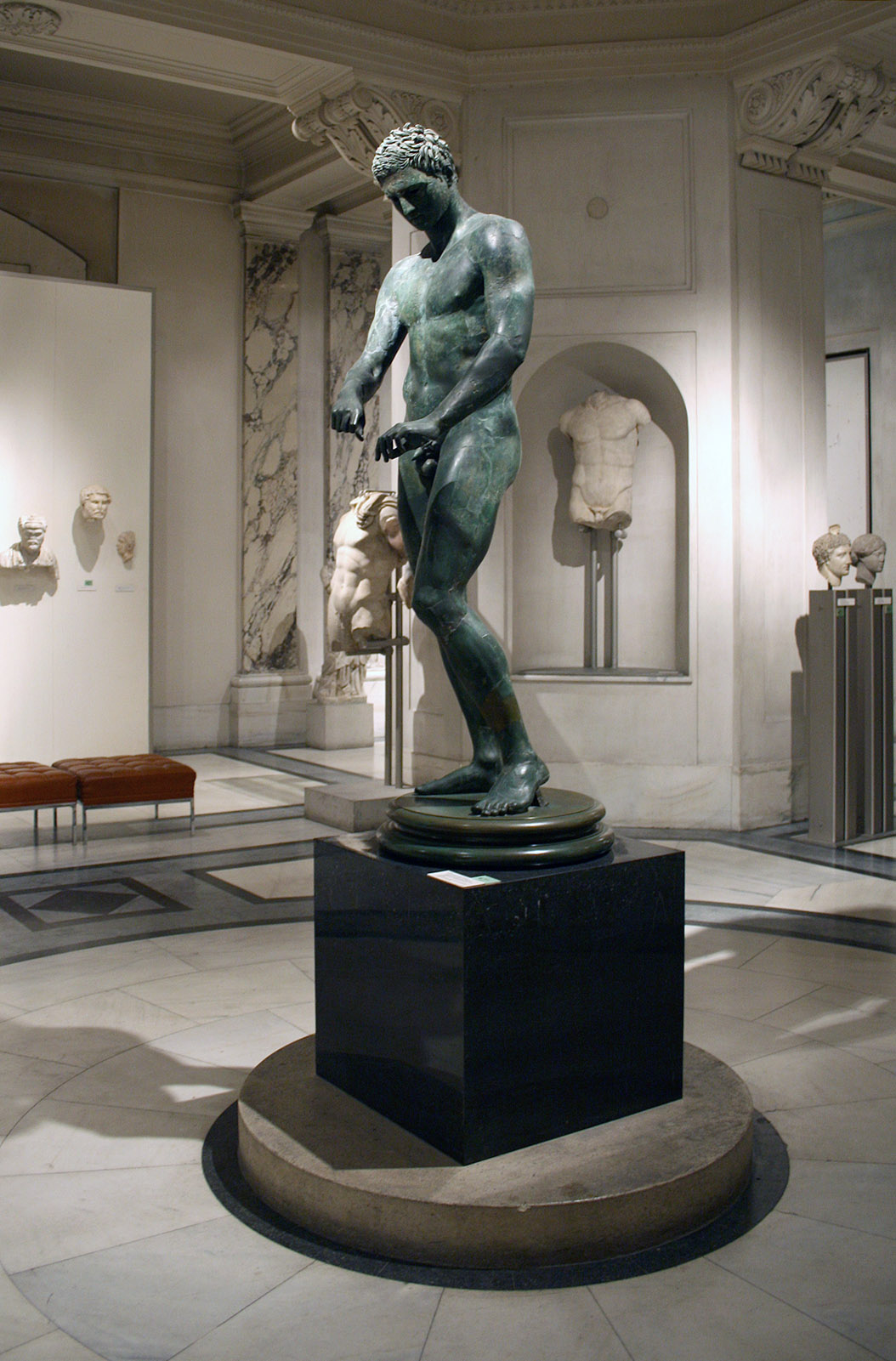
Bronze statue of an athlete

Amazon from the Artemision Altar

The Temple of Artemis, first built in the 6th century BC, was one of the Seven Wonders of the World. After being burned down in the 4th century BC, it was rebuilt, during which the sacrificial altar to Artemis was encircled with a spectacular surrounding wall. The sculpture of the upper part of a wounded Amazon stems from this wall.

Parthian Monument

The Parthian Monument is one of the most important Roman-age reliefs from Asia Minor. In five thematic cycles it commemorates the Roman Emperor Lucius Verus, who established a camp in Ephesus during his Parthian Campaign of 161-165 AD. The individual pieces have been arranged in the form of a monumental altar, but this is only a guess at their correct arrangement, as they were not found in their original state. The friezes have a total length of about 70 metres, of which 40 metres are on display.

Bronze Statue of an Athlete

This Roman statue from the first century AD, copied from a Greek original from the fourth century BC, has been recreated from 234 fragments; it shows a young athlete cleaning his strigil, an implement used to wash the body after a contest. This motif was well-known and widely popular in the ancient world, and the statue cannot be attributed to any specific Greek artist.
