= Principality of Hutt River =

Micronation in Australia (1970–2020)

- Micronation (unrecognised entity)
- Location: 75 km^{2} (29 mi^{2}) of land near Northampton, Western Australia; 28°4′28″S 114°28′14.5″E
- Claimed by: Leonard Casley
- Dates claimed: 21 April 1970–3 August 2020

The Principality of Hutt River, often referred to by its former name, the Hutt River Province, was a micronation in Australia, proclaimed on 21 April 1970 when farmer Leonard Casley declared his farm to be a sovereign state, the "Hutt River Province". He claimed to have seceded from Australia, which occurred during his dispute with the authorities concerning wheat production quotas. A few years later, Casley began styling himself as "Prince Leonard" and granting family members royal titles, although he did not include the word "principality" in the official name until 2006. In 2017, Casley's claim to rulership was taken over by his son Graeme, who dropped the claim to sovereignty on 3 August 2020.

The claimed territory was located 517 km (321 mi) north of Perth, near the town of Northampton in the state of Western Australia. It had an area of 75 square kilometres (29 sq mi), making it larger than several recognised countries. It was not recognised as a country by the Australian Government or any other national government, and the High Court of Australia and Supreme Court of Western Australia rejected submissions arguing that it was not subject to Australian laws.

The "principality" was a regional tourist attraction until it announced it was closed to tourists after 31 January 2020. It issued its own currency, stamps and passports (which are not recognised by the federal Australian government or any other government).. It also had an anthem ("It's a Hard Land") written by Keith Kerwin in 1984.

Leonard Casley died on 13 February 2019.

== History ==
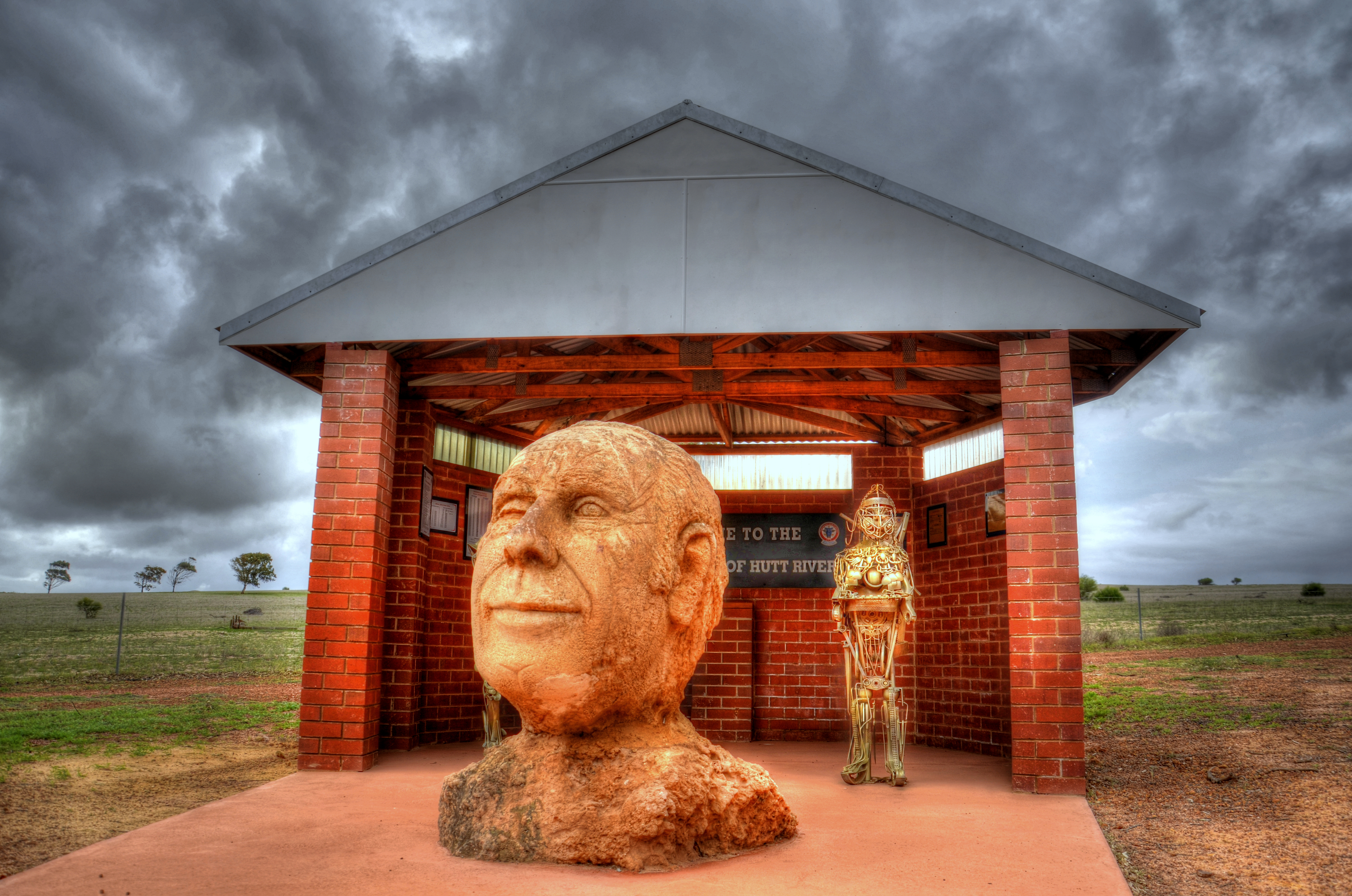
Leonard Casley bust

Leonard Casley (28 August 1925 – 13 February 2019) declared the principality an independent province in 1970 in response to a dispute with the government of Western Australia over what the Casley family considered draconian wheat production quotas. The Casley farm had around 4,000 hectares (9,900 acres) of wheat ready to harvest when the quotas were issued, which allowed Casley to sell only 1,647 US bushels (58,000 L; 13,180 US dry gal; 12,770 imp gal) or approximately 40 hectares (99 acres). Initially, the five families who owned farms at Hutt River banded together to fight the quota, and Casley lodged a protest with the Governor of Western Australia, Sir Douglas Kendrew. The governor did not assist.

Two weeks later, Casley claimed that the government introduced a bill into Parliament to "resume" his and the other families' lands under compulsory acquisition laws. At this point, Casley claimed that international law allowed them to secede and declare independence from the Commonwealth of Australia. Casley said that he nonetheless remained loyal to Queen Elizabeth II. At about this time, Casley claimed that in correspondence with the governor-general's office, Casley was on one occasion inadvertently addressed as the "Administrator of the Hutt River Province". Casley claimed that this constituted a legally binding recognition of the principality. Shortly thereafter, Casley styled himself "His Majesty Prince Leonard I of Hutt". He did this because he believed it would enable him to take advantage of the British Treason Act 1495, which provides that the de facto king of a nation cannot be guilty of treason in relation to any act against the lawful king and that anyone who interfered with that monarch's duties could be charged with treason.

Casley said that he continued to sell his wheat in open defiance of the quota. Casley believed that under Australian law the federal government had two years to respond to Casley's declaration of sovereignty. Casley says the failure to respond gave the province "de facto autonomy" on 21 April 1972, but that the Western Australian government can still dispute the secession.

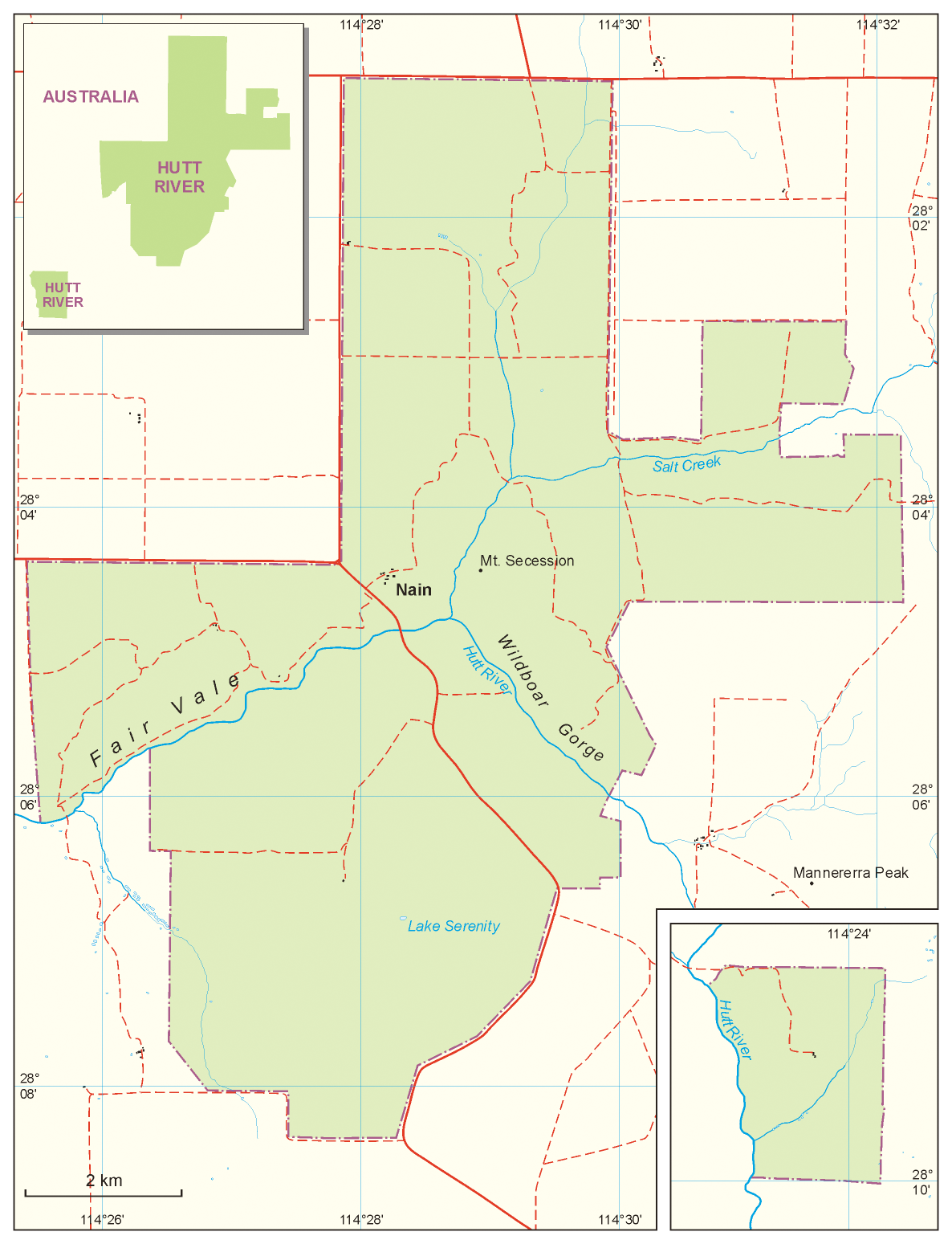
Principality of Hutt River

On 15 February 1977, despite Casley's claims to sovereignty, he was successfully prosecuted for failing to comply with requirements to furnish the Australian Taxation Office (ATO) with required documents.

On 2 December 1977, Casley "declared war" on Australia, but notified authorities of the cessation of hostilities several days later. It may be more than coincidence that this declaration of war came in just a few months after a court decision where Casley was fined for failing to furnish the ATO with certain documents. The short state of war between the principality and Australia was a scheme whereby the Prince's purpose was to argue that, under the Geneva Treaty Convention of 12 August 1949, a government should show full respect to a nation undefeated from a state of war.

In 1978, Casley appealed to the Supreme Court of Western Australia against a conviction for conducting a shop on his property without a permit. His appeal was dismissed, except to alter the penalty.

In 1970 and 1984, Casley unsuccessfully defended civil legal actions brought against him by private parties – in the former case an injunction was granted against him in relation to a land deal; in the latter case he was ordered to pay debts owed to a publishing company he had contracted to print copies of a book called The Man, which was about himself and his achievements. Casley did not suggest in these cases that he was not subject to the jurisdiction of the courts of Australia. The principality released over 50 different sets of stamps and these postage stamps have a solid global following, and coins.

In about 2006, Casley was again successfully prosecuted by the Australian Taxation Office. He sought special leave to appeal to the High Court of Australia, but his application was dismissed with the comment that his arguments were "fatuous, frivolous and vexatious".

In September 2006, Casley decided to change the province's name to "Principality of Hutt River".

In January 2017, Casley announced that after ruling for 45 years, he would be stepping down, to be succeeded by his youngest son, Graeme. With a number of potential sons and daughters, the successor was nominated by Casley and approved by a crown committee. Some commentary at the time had expected his older son, Ian, to be the successor.

In June 2017, Casley was ordered by the Supreme Court of Western Australia to pay $2.7 million in unpaid tax, and his son Arthur Casley was ordered to pay $242,000 in unpaid tax.

In February 2019, Casley died, leaving his son, Graeme Casley, to succeed to the throne as "Prince Graeme" and inherit his $2.5 million debt to the Australian Taxation Office. In December 2019, citing declining revenue from agriculture as well as a drop in tourist numbers, the principality issued a media release to announce that it would be closing its borders with effect from 31 January 2020. The principality would no longer accept visitors, would cease to issue entry and exit visas and would stand down most government services and offices for the duration of the hiatus. The announcement included the following statement: "It is with a heavy heart and after much thought and consultation with my Cabinet and ADC that I have to inform all that the Government of the Principality of Hutt River is about to go on hiatus. Our borders will be closed to all (including tourists) and all government external services will cease at close of business Friday 31 January 2020 until further notice."

On 3 August 2020, the principality was formally dissolved, amidst disputes with the Australian Taxation Office demanding the principality pay millions in unpaid taxes across its 50-year history as well as the financial market impact of the COVID-19 pandemic. The principality's owned land was sold off to settle the tax dispute.

== Status ==
The principality had no legal status as a matter of Australian law. In 2007, the High Court of Australia dismissed an application by Casley for leave to appeal against a judgment against him relating to his son Leonard's failure to file tax returns. Leonard argued that he resided in the "Hutt River Province" and that it is not part of Australia and not subject to Australian taxation law. The court dismissed Casley's application and found that his arguments were "fatuous, frivolous, and vexatious."

The Australian government unequivocally stated on its website that it did not recognise the secession of the principality. Passports issued by the principality were not recognised by the Australian government. Leonard made unverified claims that they have been accepted on some occasions by some unspecified foreign countries, but there was a documented instance of a man being arrested in Germany for attempting to use a Hutt River Province "diplomatic passport".

Casley claimed that the ATO sent him a tax demand in 2012 to which he simply responded with a document stating that he was a "foreign national and non-resident of Australia". He also repeatedly claimed that he was classed by the ATO as a "non-resident of Australia for income tax purposes" and did not pay tax. In 2017, however, Justice Le Miere of the Supreme Court of Western Australia ordered Leonard to pay more than A$2.7 million in unpaid taxes, and Arthur Casley to pay more than A$242,000 in unpaid taxes. The judge said that their argument of sovereignty "has no legal merit or substance. Anyone can declare themselves a sovereign in their own home but they cannot ignore the laws of Australia or not pay tax." An appeal to the Court of Appeal was dismissed.

Despite this, the principality continued to argue that it was an independent entity within the Australian legal system. The principality tried repeatedly to use a document purporting to be a letter from the Commonwealth Department of Territories admitting that the principality was a "legal entity". The Australian government noted that Casley "has used the document in various countries in the past and even sent a copy of it to Senator Evans in 1993". The Australian government also told foreign governments that "We have seen the purported 'Department of Territories Minute' before. The clumsy language, including a Malapropian use of 'a moot point' gives it away for what it is, a poorly attempted forgery."

The principality claimed that all social security benefits were withdrawn from Hutt River's residents at the time of secession by the Australian government. It further claimed that residents did not receive pensions, medical benefits, educational allowances, child endowments, or benefits normally paid to war veterans. Voting is compulsory by law in Australia, but Casley claimed to have successfully removed the names of Hutt River residents from the Australian electoral roll. Casley admitted that he made annual payments to the Shire of Northampton, the local government authority, although he chose to characterise these payments as "gifts" rather than council rates. The principality said that it levied its own income tax of 0.5 per cent on financial transactions by foreign companies registered in the province and personal accounts.

There were some occasions where organisations stated that the province had some sort of sovereignty:

- The National Museum of Australia contained an exhibition on the theme of "Separation" within Australia which included a Hutt River Province display which stated that Casley "successfully seceded from Australia".
- Judy Lattas, a sociologist at Macquarie University, once stated that "many officials in Western Australia, some quite high up, and even nationally in Australia are happy to play out the myth of Hutt River's sovereignty" by attending Hutt River functions, returning correspondence, and abandoning the claim for tax.
- In 2005, the Shire of Northampton listed the principality as having "high historic and social significance as the site of Australia's only independent principality."

The principality appears on Google Maps, but only as a "tourist attraction". In 2010, Brendon Grylls, Western Australian Minister for Regional Development and Lands, was asked if his state had a "position" on the principality. He replied, "only that Prince Leonard is an enigma."

=== Treatment by overseas nations ===
From 1984 to 2010, Australian diplomatic missions in 28 countries exchanged 120 diplomatic cables with Australia concerning activities relating to the principality.

In 2008, the Council of the European Union issued a memorandum identifying Hutt River passports among known "fantasy passports ... issued by private organisations and individuals" to which a visa should not be affixed.

Hong Kong does not recognise the principality, but its corporate registry did at one point recognise the principality as a place where a company could be incorporated. The Hong Kong Registry, however, were looking at reviewing their list of accredited places for company incorporation after the issue was raised in an adverse manner by Australian media.

In 2008, a 48-year-old French man who claimed to be an ambassador representing the principality to the United Arab Emirates, his 36-year-old female compatriot and a 28-year-old Pakistani man, were charged by the UAE over issuing travel documents and selling land in the principality to UAE residents under false pretences. Casley stated the man had no diplomatic standing in the Principality and had only made a single visit to the province.

In April 2016, the principality received a letter from Queen Elizabeth II which communicated the Queen's good wishes on the anniversary of the founding of the principality 46 years before, on 21 April 1970. The letter from Buckingham Palace was signed by Sonia Bonici, Senior Correspondence Officer. It reads in part: "I am to convey Her Majesty's good wishes to you and to all concerned for a most enjoyable and successful celebration on 23rd and 24th of April to mark the forty-sixth anniversary of the Principality of Hutt River." The Queen was replying to a letter from Casley congratulating her on her 90th birthday.

== Statistics ==
The principality was situated 517 km (321 mi) north of Perth, along the Hutt River. It was about 75.9 square kilometres (29.3 sq mi; 18,800 acres) in size. Exports included wildflowers, stamps and coins and agricultural produce which is also exported overseas. Tourism was also important to the economy with 40,000 tourists, predominantly from overseas countries, visiting the principality every year.

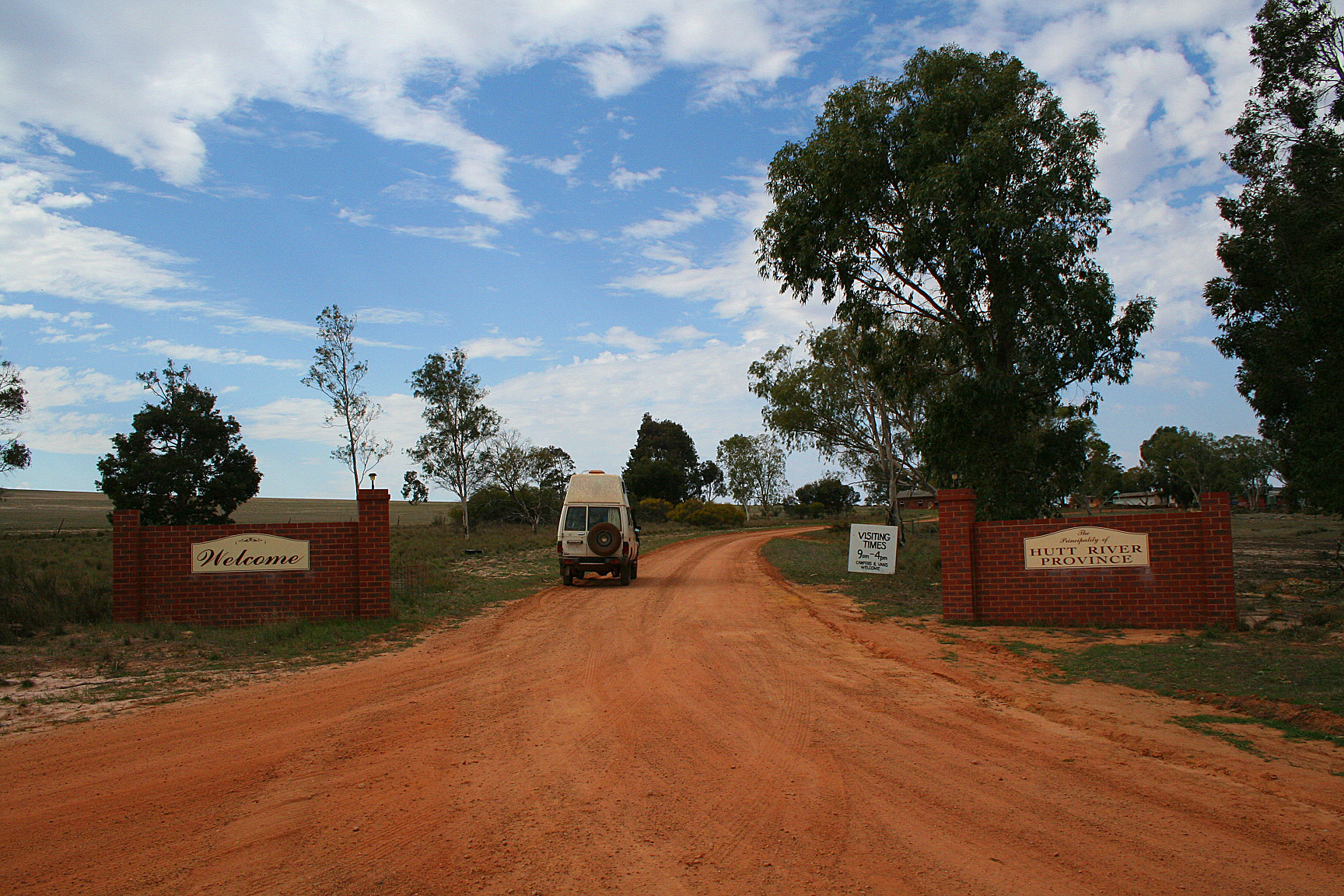
Border gate of Hutt River

While the principality had only 23 residents, it claimed a worldwide citizenry of 14,000.

After 2 September 2004, Hutt River Province/Principality accepted company registrations. At least one company experienced in the registration of entities in traditional offshore jurisdictions (British Virgin Islands, Cayman Islands etc.) as tax havens was authorised to act as a registered agent for PHR incorporations. On 29 March 2005 the Hutt River Province International Business Company announced it would accept registrations of company trusts which have since been promoted worldwide by registered financial agents. Concerned that Hutt River registrations "may be sold as part of a tax avoidance or evasion arrangement", in April 2012 the Australian Taxation Office warned potential purchasers that the registrations have no legal basis and "could be illegal".

In 1997, the legislation committee presented a proposal for a constitution to Casley and his cabinet. Although he and the cabinet never officially adopted the proposal, there was a decree stating that any constitution would be in effect while under consideration, except for any clauses that conflict with the bill of rights, so the proposal essentially became a provisional constitution.

== Casley family ==
His Royal Highness, The Prince of Hutt

Details
- Style: His Royal Highness Majesty
- First monarch: Prince Leonard I of Hutt
- Last monarch: Prince Graeme I
- Formed: 21 April 1970
- Website: Principality-Hutt-River.com

Obverse of a 50-cent coin depicting Casley

Leonard Casley worked for a shipping company based in Perth, although he left school at 14, and described himself as a mathematician and physicist; he also claimed to have written articles for NASA. He was an adherent of hermeticism, a subject on which he privately published a number of research papers and books. He is the subject of a permanent exhibit at the National Museum of Australia in Canberra.

Casley was married to Shirley (née Butler) until her death on 7 July 2013, when the principality went into a period of mourning, closing some of its services. She was styled as "Her Royal Highness Princess Shirley of Hutt, Dame of the Rose of Sharon", and she played host to dignitaries and diplomatic representatives visiting the principality each year, as well as receiving television crews and magazine journalists. She was the patroness and chair of the board of directors of the Red Cross of Hutt, a parallel organisation to the International Red Cross.

=== Princes of Hutt River ===
Hutt River had two sovereign princes over its 50-year existence, Casley as "Prince Leonard", and his son Graeme Casley as "Prince Graeme".

Both princes abdicated.

Prince	Reign Start	Reign End	Duration
Leonard I	21 April 1970	11 February 2017	46 years, 9 months and 21 days
Graeme I	11 February 2017	3 August 2020	3 years, 5 months and 23 days

== Currency ==
The principality's currency was the Hutt River Dollar, which was divided into 100 cents. The Hutt River Dollar was pegged at a one-to-one ratio with the Australian Dollar. All authorised principality coins were minted by Canada's Lombardo Mint and the New Queensland Mint.

=== First series: 1976–78 ===
Four denominations of coins, 5c, 10c, 20c and 50c, were issued from 1976 to 1978, but the 1978 issue was a proof only issue. There was also a silver $30 coin and a gold $100 coin, struck only in proof.

First Series coins
Value	Technical parameters		Description			Date of first minting
Value	Diameter	Composition	Edge	Obverse	Reverse	Date of first minting
5c	16.5 mm	Aluminium	Plain	Leonard Casley	Coat of arms	1976
10c	19.1 mm	Copper	Plain	Leonard Casley	Coat of arms	1976
20c	22.4 mm	Brass	Plain	Leonard Casley	Coat of arms	1976
50c	24.9 mm	Cupronickel	Plain	Leonard Casley	Coat of arms	1976
$30	38.1 mm	99‰ silver	Reeded	Leonard Casley	Coat of arms	1976
$100	25 mm	24 carat gold	Plain	Leonard Casley	Coat of arms	1976
For table standards, see the coin specification table.

=== Silver Jubilee $1 coin ===
1986 100-dollar Hutt River Province coin commemorating the centennial of the Statue of Liberty (front and back) manufactured by Johnson Matthey Refining, Rochester, New York

In 1977, $1 coins were struck to commemorate the Silver Jubilee of Elizabeth II. These coins are known as "holey dollars". Coins of the same design were struck again in 1978, without the inscription "Queen's Jubilee".

=== Later series ===
In 2010, the principality issued a $30 gold- and silver-plated brass coin to mark the 40th anniversary of independence. Following the death of his wife in 2013, Casley authorised a special commemorative coin to celebrate her life.

=== Commemorative coins ===
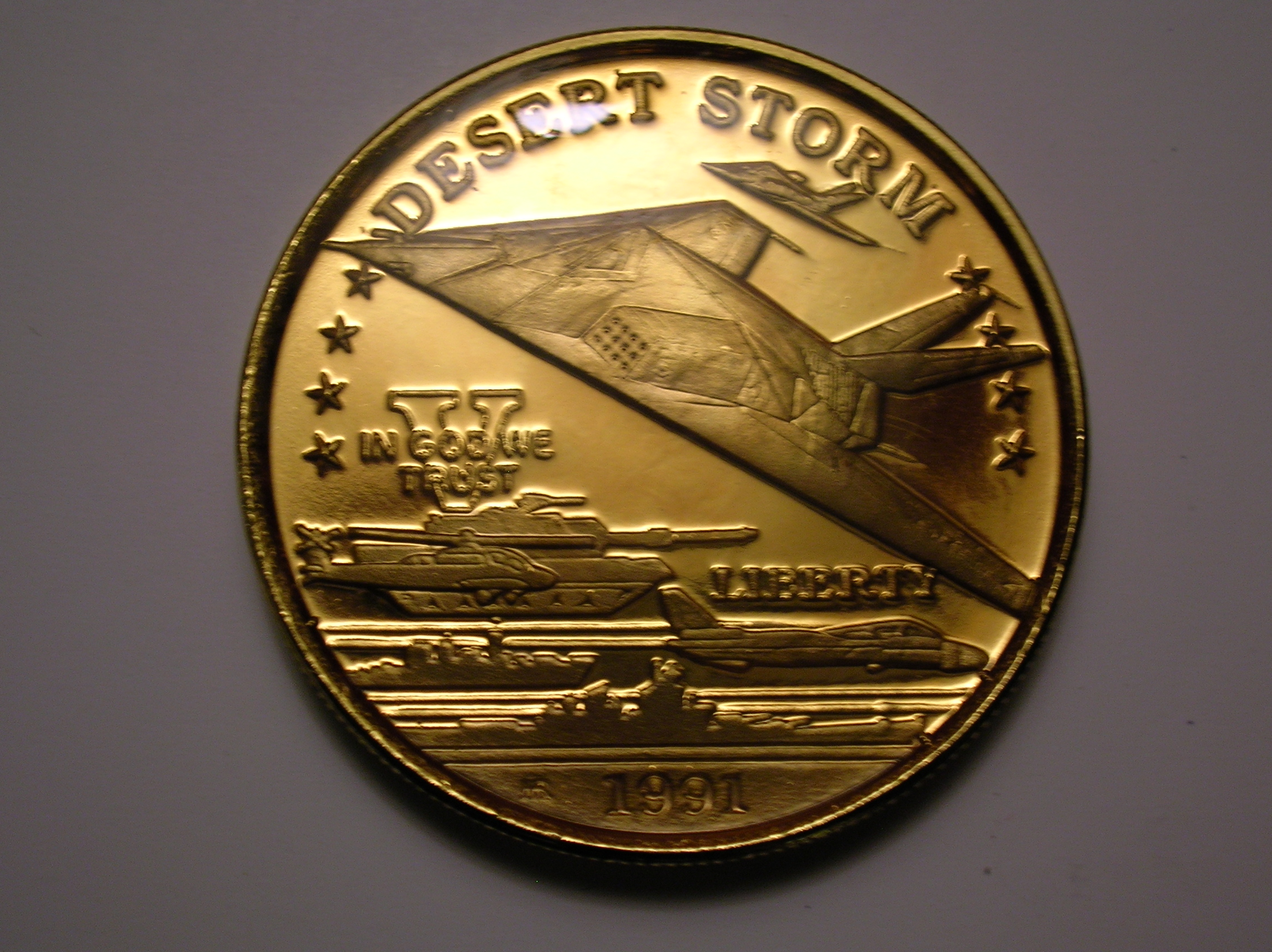
A 1991 20-dollar coin was part of a series commemorating Operation Desert Storm

All of these principality coins are contained in the standard catalogue of Unusual World Coins by Colin Bruce II, edited by Tom Michael and George Cuhaj. A A$100 denomination proof commemorative coin issue that contained one troy ounce of pure palladium sold for $299 in 1989; the 2012 value of the palladium content was $630.

== Postage stamps ==
Over 50 different sets of postage stamps were issued, which have a global following.

== See also ==
- List of proposed states of Australia
- Secessionism in Western Australia
