= Leonard Casley =

- Leonard I, Prince of Hutt
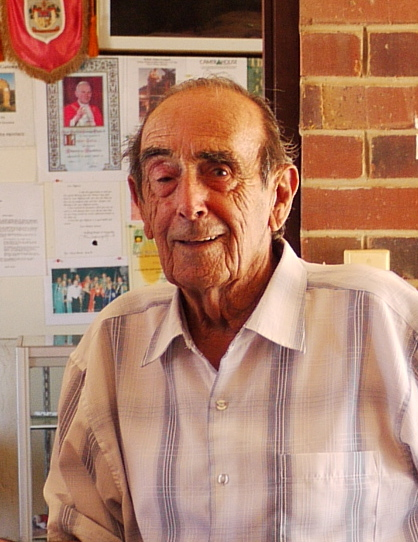
- Casley in 2010

Prince of Hutt River
- Reign: 21 April 1970 – 11 February 2017
- Successor: Graeme Casley
- Born: 28 August 1925; Kalgoorlie, Western Australia
- Died: 13 February 2019 (aged 93); Geraldton, Western Australia
- Spouse: Shirley Butler (m. 1947; wid. 2013)
- Issue: 7, including Graeme Casley
- Military career
- Allegiance: Australia
- Branch: Royal Australian Air Force
- Service years: 1943–1946

Leonard George Casley (28 August 1925 – 13 February 2019), also known as Prince Leonard, was the founder of a self-proclaimed micronation, the Principality of Hutt River, his own farm, within the Australian state of Western Australia. He governed Hutt River from 21 April 1970 until his abdication in February 2017 at a coronation ceremony that placed his son Graeme Casley on the throne.

Having pursued a number of occupations, Casley eventually settled on farming, purchasing a large wheat farm near the towns of Northampton and Geraldton in the 1960s where he came to own 75 square kilometres (29 sq mi). In 1970, he declared independence and founded Hutt River Province in response to a dispute with the Government of Western Australia over what the Casley family considered draconian wheat production quotas. "His Royal Highness Prince Leonard I of Hutt" was the style used by Casley from the creation of the principality until his death.

== Early life ==
Leonard Casley was born in Kalgoorlie, Western Australia, to George William Casley, who worked on the railways, and Enes (née Hunter). Growing up alongside younger brother Mervyn, Casley was a high school dropout who left his education during his childhood when he was studying in sixth standard.

== Career ==
Casley worked for a shipping company based in Perth. Although he left school at 14, he described himself as a mathematician and physicist; he also claimed to have written articles for NASA.

=== Military service ===
Casley served in the Royal Australian Air Force (RAAF) between 1943 and 1946, including in Borneo.

== Hutt River Province ==
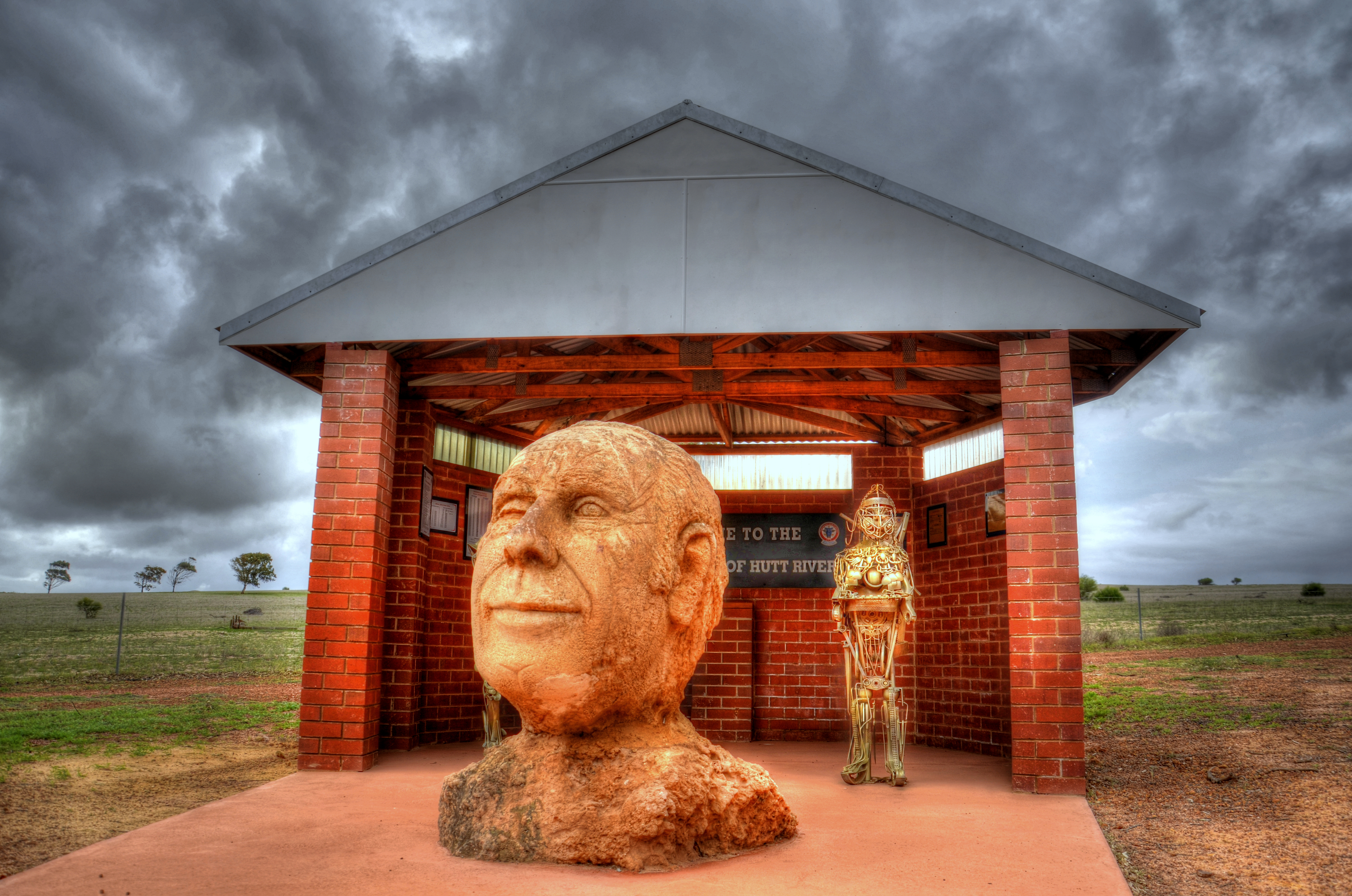
Bust of Casley

In 1969, Casley established what he called the Hutt River Province in protest at quotas being placed on wheat. He declared independence on 21 April 1970.

He created its own flag and tax system governed by laws which were enacted by his self-declared government consisting five ministers. Leonard sought to evade paying Australian taxes, and was found to owe $3 million in income tax in 2017. As part of this tax case, he sought to justify his position on the basis of the pseudolegal Strawman theory. Although Casley created stamps, micronation currency (Hutt River Dollar), visas, and passports for his sovereign state, the federal Government of Australia never officially recognised Hutt River as an official and independent nation, and later, it became a well-known tourist attraction in Australia.

=== Abdication ===
In January 2017, Casley Leonard announced that, after ruling for 45 years, he would be stepping down as prince, to be succeeded by his youngest son, Graeme. With a number of potential sons and daughters, the successor was nominated by Casley and approved by a crown committee. Some commentary at the time had expected his older son, Ian, to be the successor.

In June 2017, Casley was ordered by the Supreme Court of Western Australia to pay $2.7 million unpaid tax.

== Personal life ==
Casley was married to Shirley (née Butler) until her death on 7 July 2013, when the principality went into a period of mourning, closing some of its services. She was styled as "Her Royal Highness Princess Shirley of Hutt, Dame of the Rose of Sharon", and she played host to dignitaries and diplomatic representatives visiting the principality each year, as well as receiving television crews and magazine journalists. She was the patroness and chair of the board of directors of the Red Cross of Hutt, a parallel organisation to the International Red Cross.

As an adherent of hermeticism, Casley privately published a number of research papers and books on the subject. He is the subject of a permanent exhibit at the National Museum of Australia in Canberra.

== Death ==
Casley died two years after abdicating the throne of Hutt River, on 13 February 2019, at the age of 93. His principality outlived him by 18 months and was dissolved on 3 August 2020.

Regnal titles
New title Principality formed	Prince of the Hutt River Province (self-proclaimed); 21 April 1970 – 11 February 2017	Succeeded by Graeme I
