= Consortium imperii =

Sharing of Roman imperial authority by two or more emperors

Consortium imperii is a Latin term dating from the Roman Dominate, denoting the sharing of imperial authority between two or more emperors, each hence designated as consors imperii, i.e., "partner in (exercising) imperium", either as formal equals or in subordination, in which case the junior was often the senior's designated heir—not necessarily the natural one—and successor. In theory, this arrangement served to share the burden of government and ensure smooth succession, as rivalry at these moments was a major threat to the stability of the Empire; however, in practice the net result was often more civil war.

Although in political reality adoption was an alternative technique to aim for the same result in terms of succession (and which succeeded in producing one genealogically "false" but politically satisfactory dynasty of so-called "Adoptive Emperors"), constitutionally, this was a horror as the Republic had never been abandoned in law. Thus, monarchical succession in the Principate, however realistic, was officially out of the question, and this stigma persisted in the Dominate, despite the obviously monarchical trappings adopted by the emperors in this era. 'Designation', rather than simple adoption, could at least be justified by qualitative criteria.

== Roman consortia imperii ==
- An early case of one emperor, remaining "sole sovereign" in charge but designating one junior and successor, was Marcus Aurelius (reigned 161–180 AD), who designated Lucius Verus.
- The son of Maximinus Thrax, Gaius Julius Verus Maximus, was named Caesar in the second year (236 AD) of his father's reign (235-238 AD).
- Emperor Diocletian attempted an elaborate system with four emperors (two seniors styled Augustus, each with a junior styled Caesar), called later the Tetrarchy. Revolutionary was the notion that each was to be simultaneously in permanent charge of one quarter of the empire, not just sharing in central government. The experiment did not live up to its promise, as succession was not smoothened but contention multiplied, so the quadruple emperorship was abandoned—not the quarters, which remained as administrative and military divisions called praetorian prefecture, as did the lower level, called diocese, and the smaller size (and larger number) of Roman provinces.
- In 395, the Roman Empire was split for good, but in two halves: Western and Eastern, each under a sovereign emperor, in charge of two praetorian prefectures, each with or without a partner in government.
- Both the notion of "partnership" in the form of a senior emperor and several junior co-emperors (usually, but not necessarily, his sons), and Diocletian's titulature, but mainly versed in Greek (e.g. Sebastos for Augustus, a literal translation), became quite common in the Eastern Roman Empire, i.e. Byzantium, which lasted a further millennium after the fall of the Western Empire.

== See also ==
- Problem of two emperors – Problem arising when multiple people claim the title of emperor
