= Great Antonine Altar =

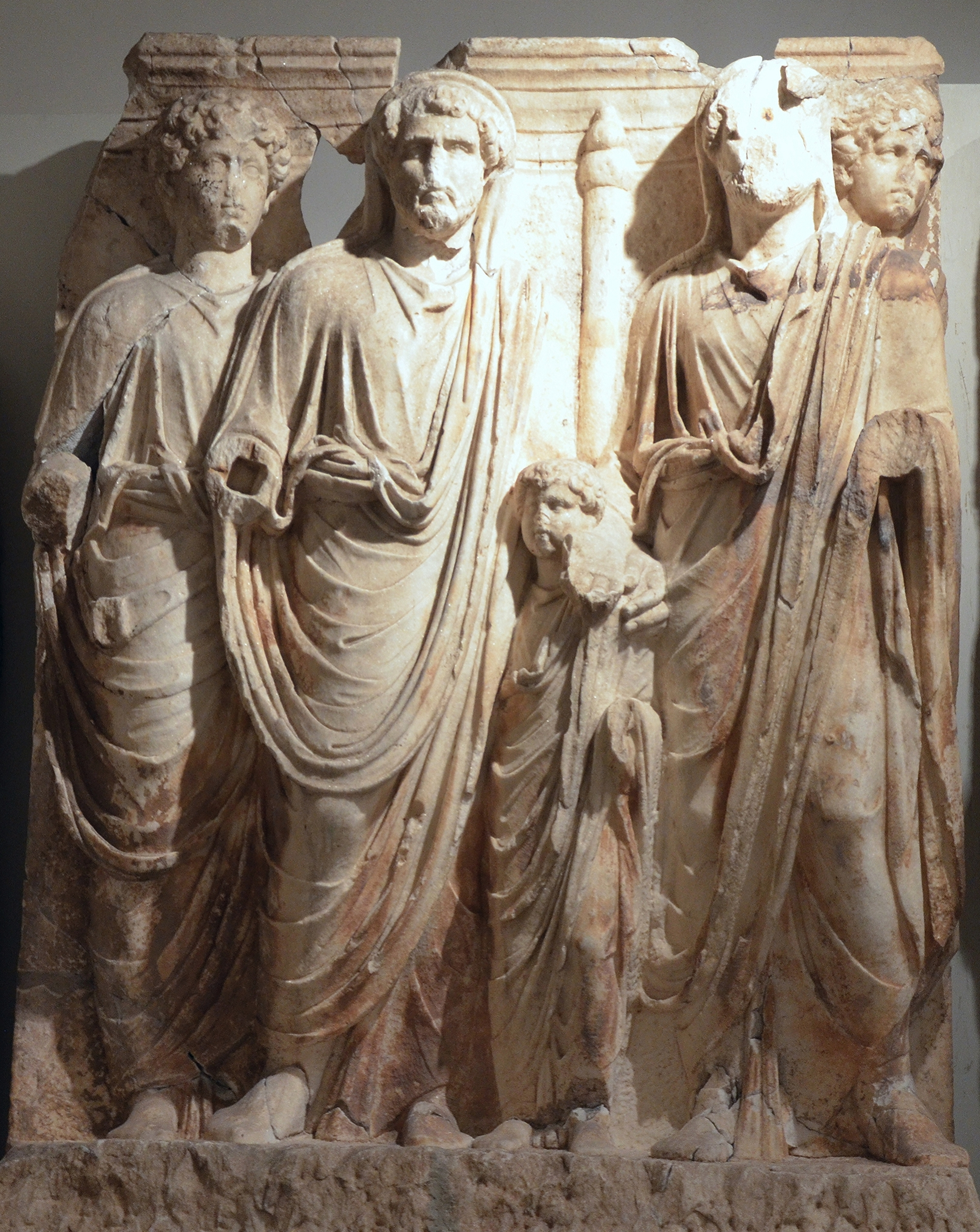
The Great Antonine Altar, the Parthian Monument reliefs, post 169 AD, Ephesos Museum Vienna, Austria (20434833803)

The Great Antonine Altar is a high relief monument discovered in Ephesus dating to around 169 CE.

== Description ==
The sculpture depicts the Antonines. Beginning on the far left, Marcus Aurelius is pictured at 17-years-old. Overlapping him, Antoninus Pius stands as a prideful, mature man, bearded, as his father, Hadrian, was known to be. To the right of Antoninus Pius stands Lucius Verus. To his right, we see Hadrian, who cloaks the image of a young woman, Faustina the Younger. She is the daughter of Antoninus Pius and the future wife of Marcus Aurelius. The sculpture is presently housed in the Kunsthistorisches Museum in Vienna.

== See also ==
Other monuments given by the Ottoman Empire:

- Pergamon Altar
- Nereid Monument
- Sam'al lions
- Las Incantadas
