= Ephesus Archaeological Museum =

Ephesus Museum
- Efes Müzesi
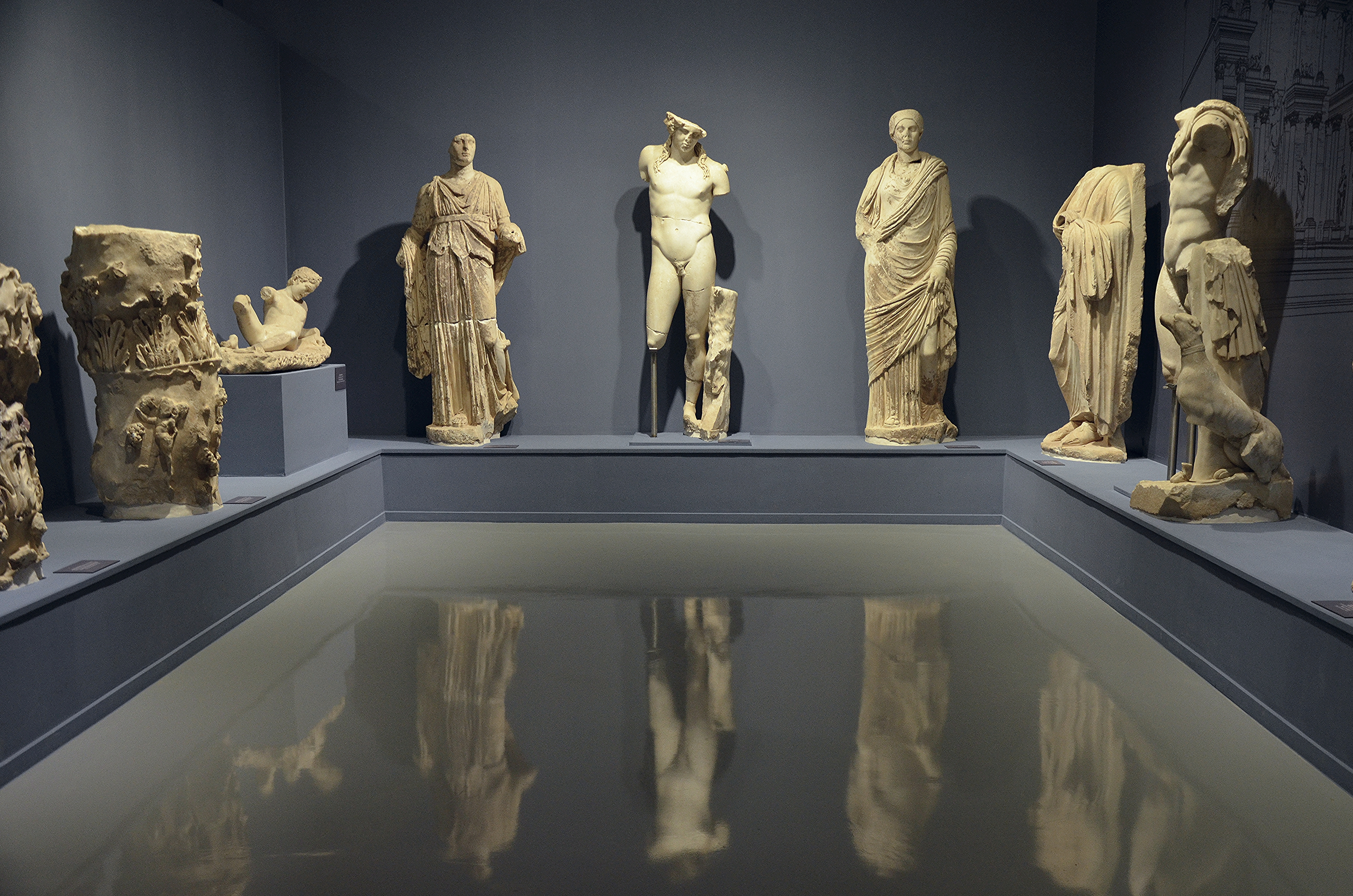
- Statues from the Fountain of Trajan

- Location within Turkey
- Location: Selçuk, İzmir Province, Turkey
- Coordinates: 37°56′56″N 27°22′4″E
- Type: Archaeological museum
- Website: Ephesus Museum

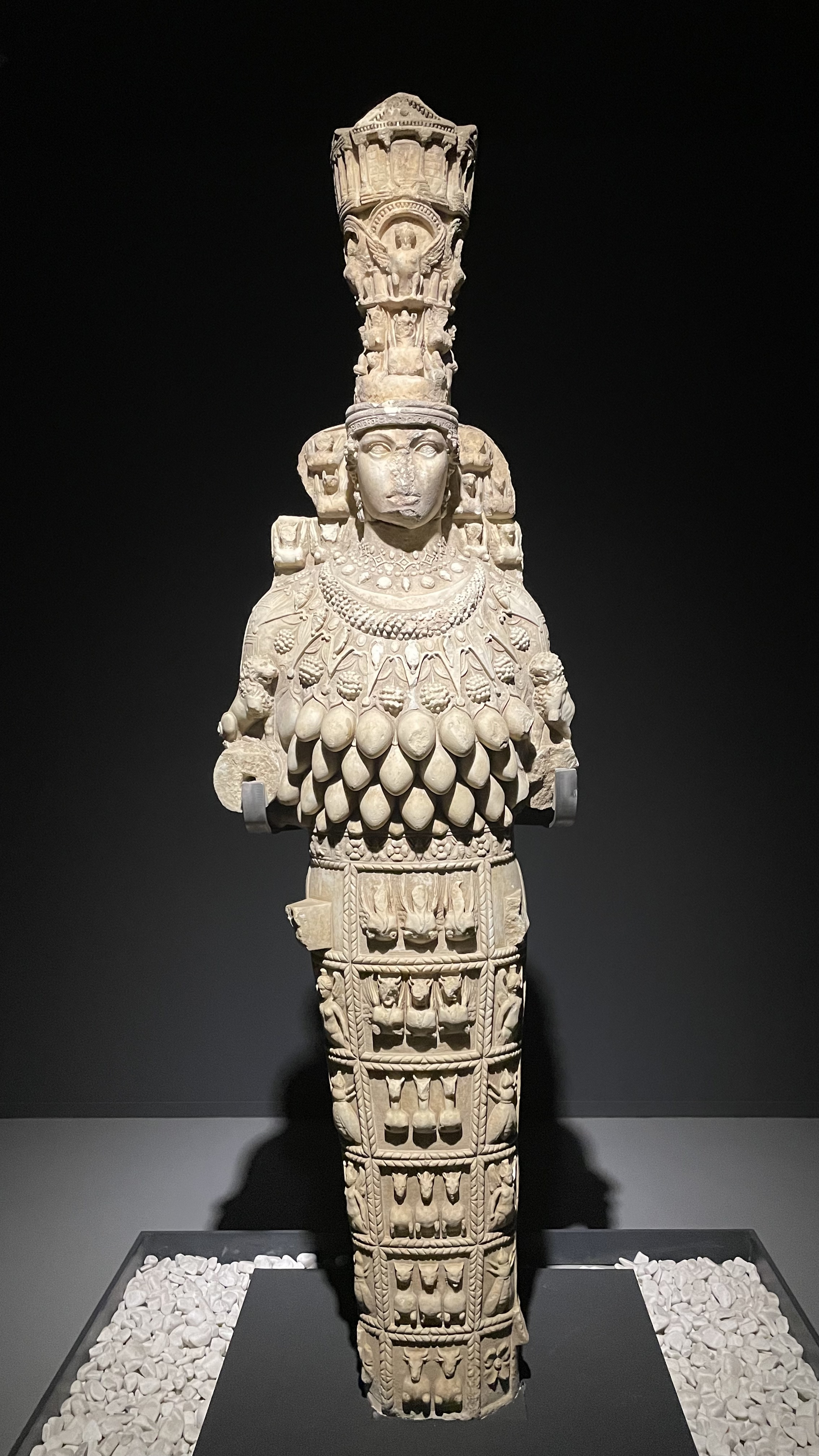
The Artemis of Ephesus

The Ephesus Archaeological Museum (Turkish: Efes Müzesi) is an archaeological museum in Selçuk near the Ancient Greek city of İzmir, Turkey. It houses finds from the nearby Ephesus excavation site. Its best-known exhibit is the ancient statue of the Greek Goddess Artemis retrieved from the temple of the goddess in Ephesus.

== History ==
The artefacts dug up at Ephesus between 1867 and 1905 were taken to be displayed at the British Museum, and those excavated from 1905 to 1923 were taken to the Ephesos Museum in Vienna. Turkish law was changed to forbid taking any findings out of the country, and a depot was constructed in Selçuk in 1929 to store items discovered from this point onwards. With the growth in the number of artefacts, it became necessary to transfer them to a larger space, and the museum was opened in 1964. The museum space was then further expanded in 1976. Until recently, all excavations were displayed in the museum, however due to size constraints, some pieces are now displayed at the excavation site. There has also been a large effort to repatriate artefacts taken out of the country.

There are approximately 64 thousand pieces exhibited in the Ephesus Museum. The items showcased are from across a variety of historical periods, including Hellenistic, Roman and Early Christian periods. The museum also holds items from Çukuriçi Höyük, the Basilica of St. John, and the Temple of Artemis.

The museum closed at the end of 2012, and reopened in November 2014 after extensive renovations.

== Sections in Ephesus Archaeological Museum ==
- Terrace Houses Findings Hall
- Fountain Findings Hall
- New Findings and Small Findings Hall
- Great Courtyard
- Grave Findings Hall
- Artemis of Ephesus Hall
- Emperor Cults Hall
- Small Courtyard

== Notes ==
- "Ephesus Museum, Selçuk". sacred-destinations.com. Archived from the original on 12 January 2011.
