= Pancrates of Athens =

2nd century Greek philosopher

Pancrates (Greek: Παγκράτης; fl. c. 140 AD) of Athens, was a Cynic philosopher. Philostratus relates, that when the celebrated sophist Lollianus was in danger of being stoned by the Athenians in a tumult about bread, Pancrates quieted the mob by exclaiming that Lollianus was not a "bread-dealer" (Greek: ἀρτοπώλης) but a "word-dealer" (Greek: λογοπώλης). Alciphron also mentions a Cynic philosopher of this name in his fictitious letters.
