= Ephesus =

Ancient Greek city in Anatolia

- Ἔφεσος (Éphesos); Efes
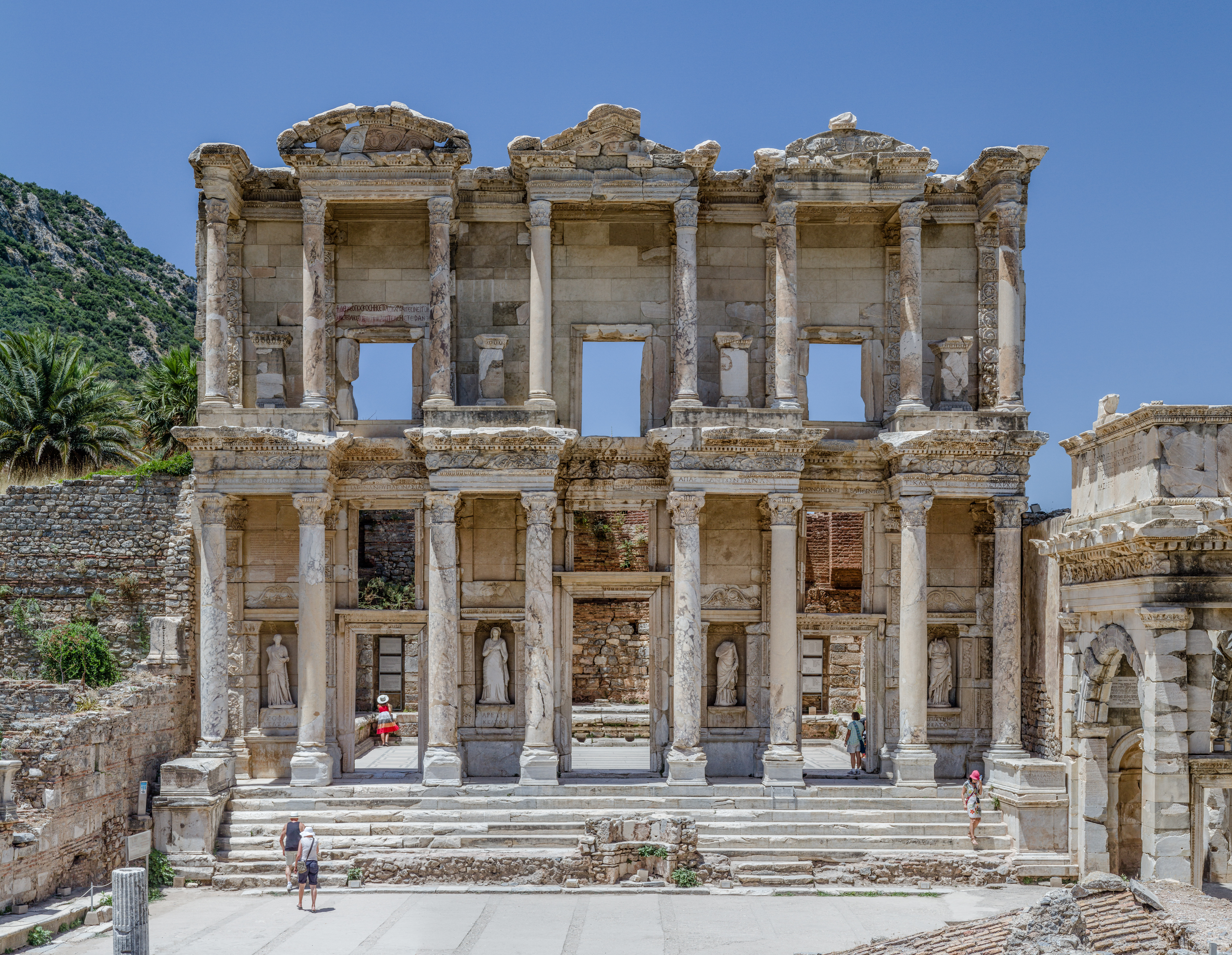
- The Library of Celsus in Ephesus

- Location within Turkey Location within Asia
- 37°56′28″N 27°20′31″E
- Type: Ancient Greek settlement
- Periods: Greek Dark Ages to Late Middle Ages
- Location: Selçuk, İzmir Province, Turkey, West Asia
- Region: Ionia
- Part of: West Asia

History
- Built: 10th century BC
- Built by: Attic and Ionian Greeks
- Abandoned: 15th century

Site notes
- Area: Wall circuit: 415 ha (1,030 acres); Occupied: 224 ha (550 acres)
- Excavation dates: 1863–1869, 1895 – present
- Archaeologists: John Turtle Wood; Otto Benndorf
- Public access: yes
- Website: www.muze.gov.tr/en/museums/ephesus-archaeological-site

UNESCO World Heritage Site
- Criteria: Cultural: iii, iv, vi
- Reference: 1018
- Inscription: 2015 (39th Session)
- Area: 662.62 ha (1,637.4 acres)
- Buffer zone: 1,246.3 ha (3,080 acres)

Ephesus (/ˈɛfɪsəs/ EF-uh-suhs; Ancient Greek: Έφεσος) was an ancient Greek city on the coast of Ionia, in present-day Selçuk in İzmir Province, Turkey. It was built in the 10th century BC on the site of Apasa, a city-state that was also the capital of Arzawa, by Attic and Ionian Greek colonists. During the Classical Greek era, it was one of twelve cities that were members of the Ionian League. The city came under the control of the Roman Republic in 129 BC.

The city was famous in its day for the nearby Temple of Artemis (completed around 550 BC), which has been designated one of the Seven Wonders of the Ancient World. Its many monumental buildings included the Library of Celsus and a theatre capable of holding 24,000 spectators.

Ephesus was a recipient city of one of the Pauline epistles and one of the seven churches of Asia addressed in the Book of Revelation. The Gospel of John may have been written there, and it was the site of several 5th-century Christian Councils (Council of Ephesus). The city was destroyed by the Goths in 263. Although it was afterwards rebuilt, its importance as a port and commercial centre declined as the harbour was slowly silted up by the Küçükmenderes River. In 614, it was partially destroyed by an earthquake.

Today, the ruins of Ephesus are a favourite international and local tourist attraction, being accessible from Adnan Menderes Airport and from the resort town Kuşadası. In 2015, the ruins were designated a UNESCO World Heritage Site.

== History ==
=== Neolithic age ===
Humans had begun inhabiting the area surrounding Ephesus by the Neolithic Age (about 6000 BC), as shown by evidence from excavations at the nearby höyük (artificial mounds known as tells) of Arvalya and Cukurici.

=== Bronze Age ===
==== Early Bronze ====
Excavations in recent years have unearthed settlements from the early Bronze Age at Ayasuluk Hill.

==== Late Bronze ====
According to Hittite sources, the capital of the kingdom of Arzawa (another independent state in Western and Southern Anatolia/Asia Minor) was Apasa (or Abasa), and some scholars suggest that this is the same place the Greeks later called Ephesus. In 1954, a burial ground from the Mycenaean era (1500–1400 BC), which contained ceramic pots, was discovered close to the ruins of the basilica of St. John. This was the period of the Mycenaean expansion, when the Ahhiyawa began settling in Asia Minor, a process that continued into the 13th century BC. The names Apasa and Ephesus appear to be cognate, and recently found inscriptions seem to pinpoint the places in the Hittite record.

=== Iron Age ===
==== Greek migration ====
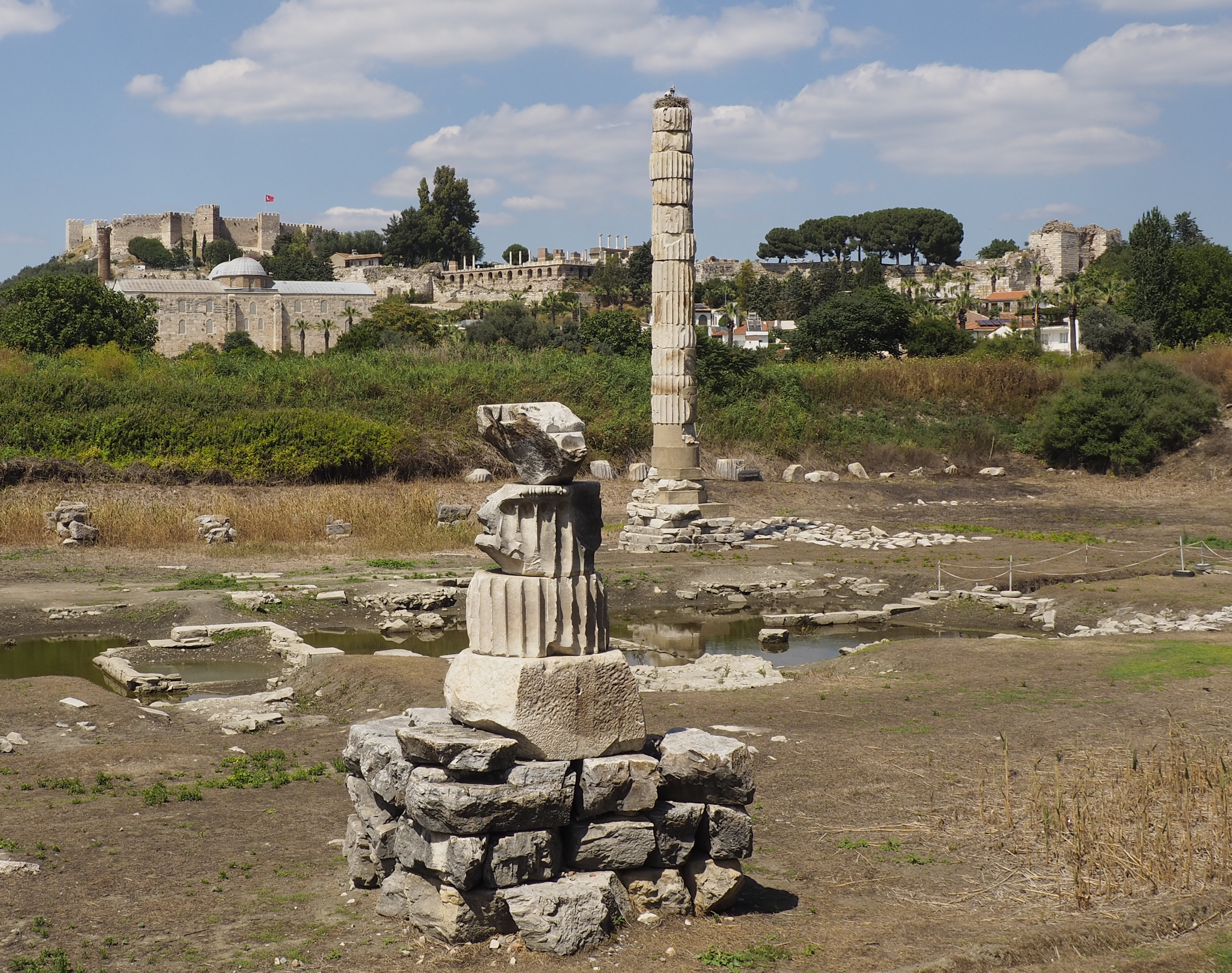
Site of the Temple of Artemis in the town of Selçuk, near Ephesus.

Ephesus was founded as an Attic-Ionian colony in the 10th century BC on a hill (now known as the Ayasuluk Hill), three kilometers (1.9 miles) from the centre of ancient Ephesus (as attested by excavations at the Seljuk castle during the 1990s). The mythical founder of the city was a prince of Athens named Androklos, who had to leave his country after the death of his father, King Kodros. According to the legend, he founded Ephesus on the place where the oracle of Delphi became reality ("A fish and a boar will show you the way"). He was a successful warrior, and as a king he was able to join the twelve cities of Ionia together into the Ionian League. During his reign the city began to prosper. He died in a battle against the Carians when he came to the aid of Priene, another city of the Ionian League. Androklos and his dog are depicted on the Hadrian temple frieze, dating from the 2nd century. Later, Greek historians such as Pausanias, Strabo, and Herodotos and the poet Kallinos reassigned the city's mythological foundation to Ephos, queen of the Amazons.

The Greek goddess Artemis and the great Anatolian goddess Kybele were identified together as Artemis of Ephesus. The many-breasted "Lady of Ephesus", identified with Artemis, was venerated in the Temple of Artemis, one of the Seven Wonders of the World and the largest building of the ancient world according to Pausanias (4.31.8). Pausanias mentions that the temple was built by Ephesus, son of the river god Caystrus, before the arrival of the Ionians. Of this structure, scarcely a trace remains.

Ancient sources seem to indicate that an older name of the place was Alope (Ancient Greek: Ἀλόπη, romanized: Alópē).

==== Archaic period ====
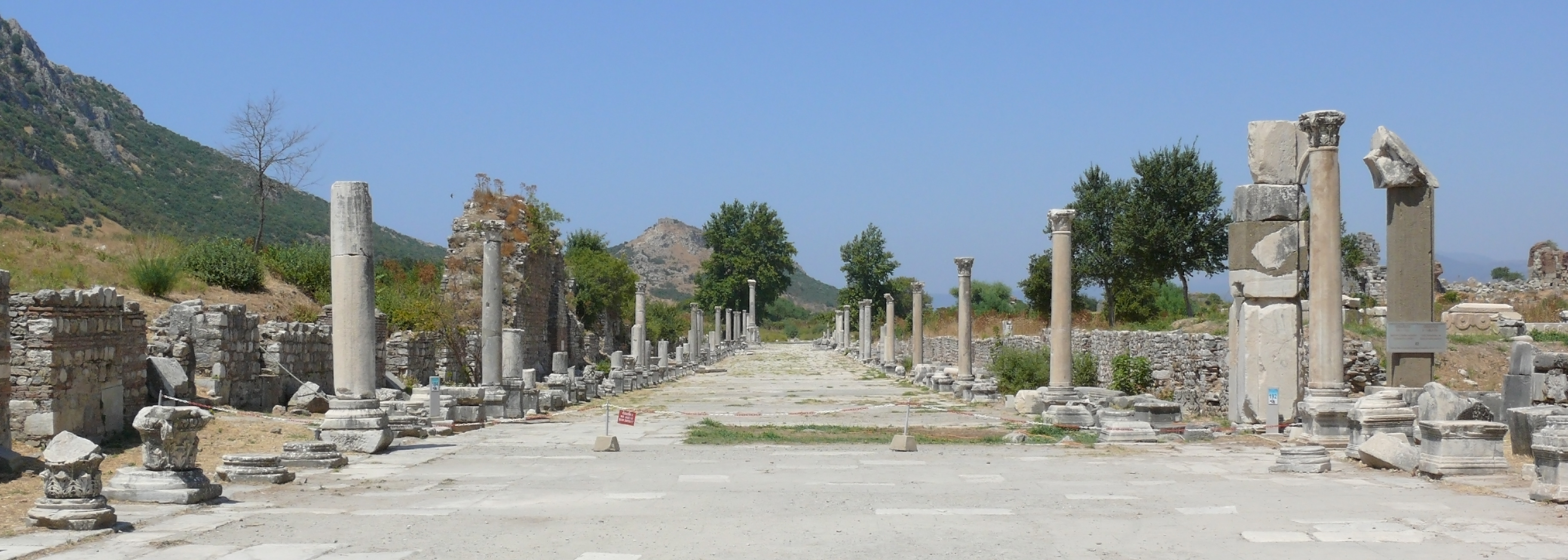
Street scene at the archeological excavations at Ephesus.

Ephesus became an important ally to the kingdom of Lydia because, like other Ionian cities, it had a port that provided land locked Lydia with trade. Hence, its rulers were connected with the Mermnad dynasty by marriage. Melas the Elder was the brother-in-law of Gyges (680–652 BC), while his grandson Miletus married the daughter of Ardys in the late 7th c. BC. This may explain why in 640 BC, Ephesus and the sanctuary of Artemis were raided, following Sardis, by the Cimmerians, a warlike people who had destroyed the kingdom of Phrygia in central Anatolia decades before. Pythagoras became a tyrant towards the late 7th century BC and adopted an anti-aristocratic policy. Melas the Younger must have succeeded him in power, while his son Pindar was a tyrant when his uncle Croesus ascended to the Lydian throne. In the conflict over the Lydian throne Pindar took the side of Croesus's half-brother Pantaleon.

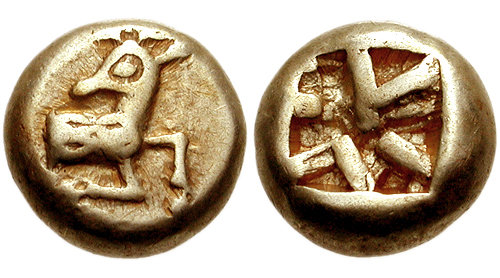
Electrum coin from Ephesus, 620–600 BC. Obverse: Forepart of stag. Reverse: Square incuse punch.

Croesus besieged the city, but the Ephesians connected the walls with a rope extending to the sacred Artemisium and thus were spared. Consequently, Pindar was exiled and Ephesus made peace with Lydia, while Croesus is said to have regretted the sacrilege and thus became the main contributor to the reconstruction of the temple of Artemis.

Later in the same century, the Lydians under Croesus went to war against Persia, which had recently conquered the Median Kingdom. The Ionians refused a peace offer from Cyrus the Great, siding with the Lydians instead. After the Persians defeated Croesus, the Ionians offered to make peace, but Cyrus insisted that they surrender and become part of the empire. They were defeated by the Persian army commander Harpagos in 547 BC. The Persians then incorporated the Greek cities of Asia Minor into the Achaemenid Empire. Those cities were then ruled by satraps.

Ephesus has intrigued archaeologists because for the Archaic Period there is no definite location for the settlement. There are numerous sites to suggest the movement of a settlement between the Bronze Age and the Roman period, but the silting up of the natural harbours as well as the movement of the Kayster River meant that the location never remained the same.

=== Classical period ===
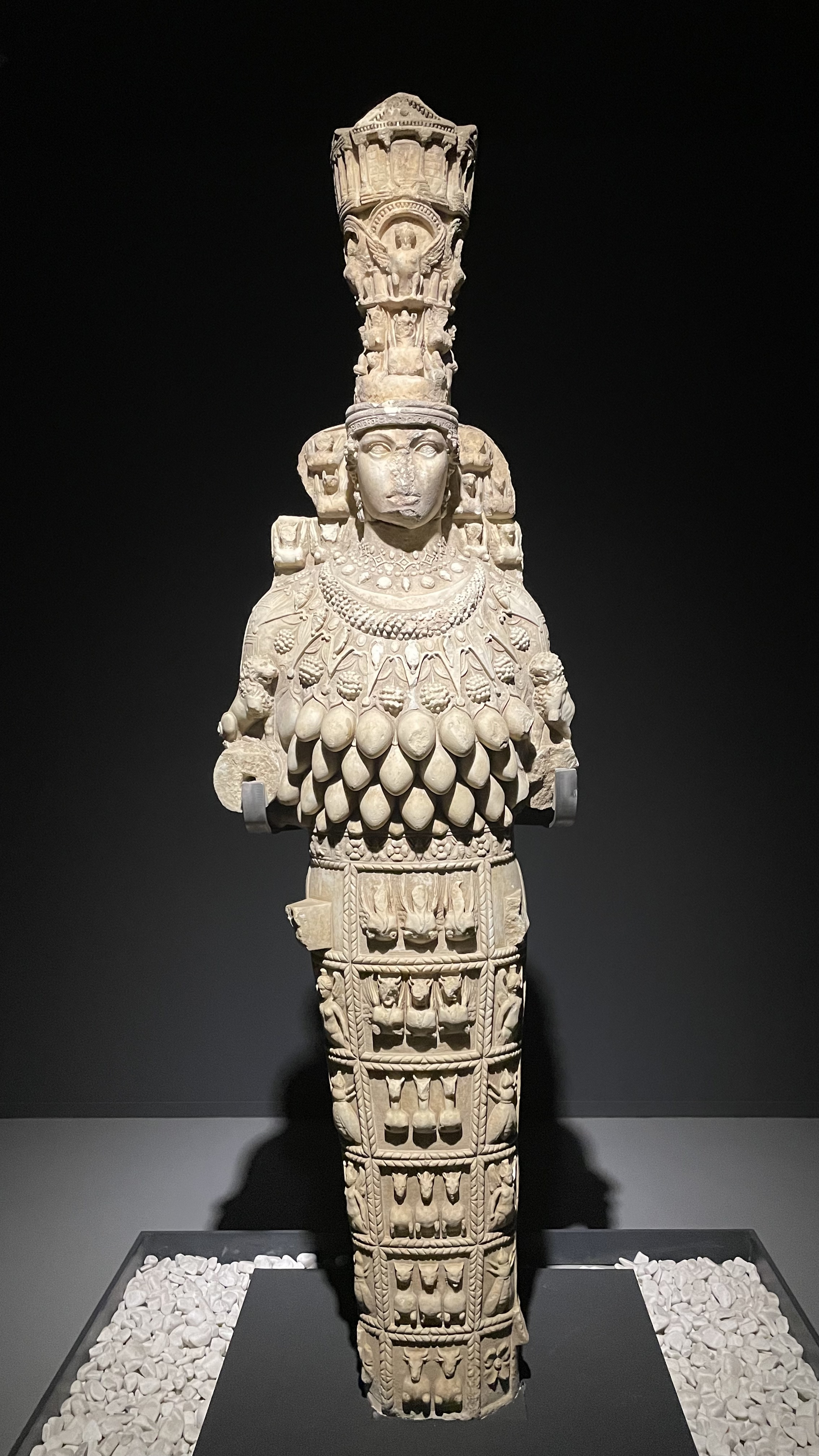
Artemis Statue, 1st century AD, Ephesus Archaeological Museum

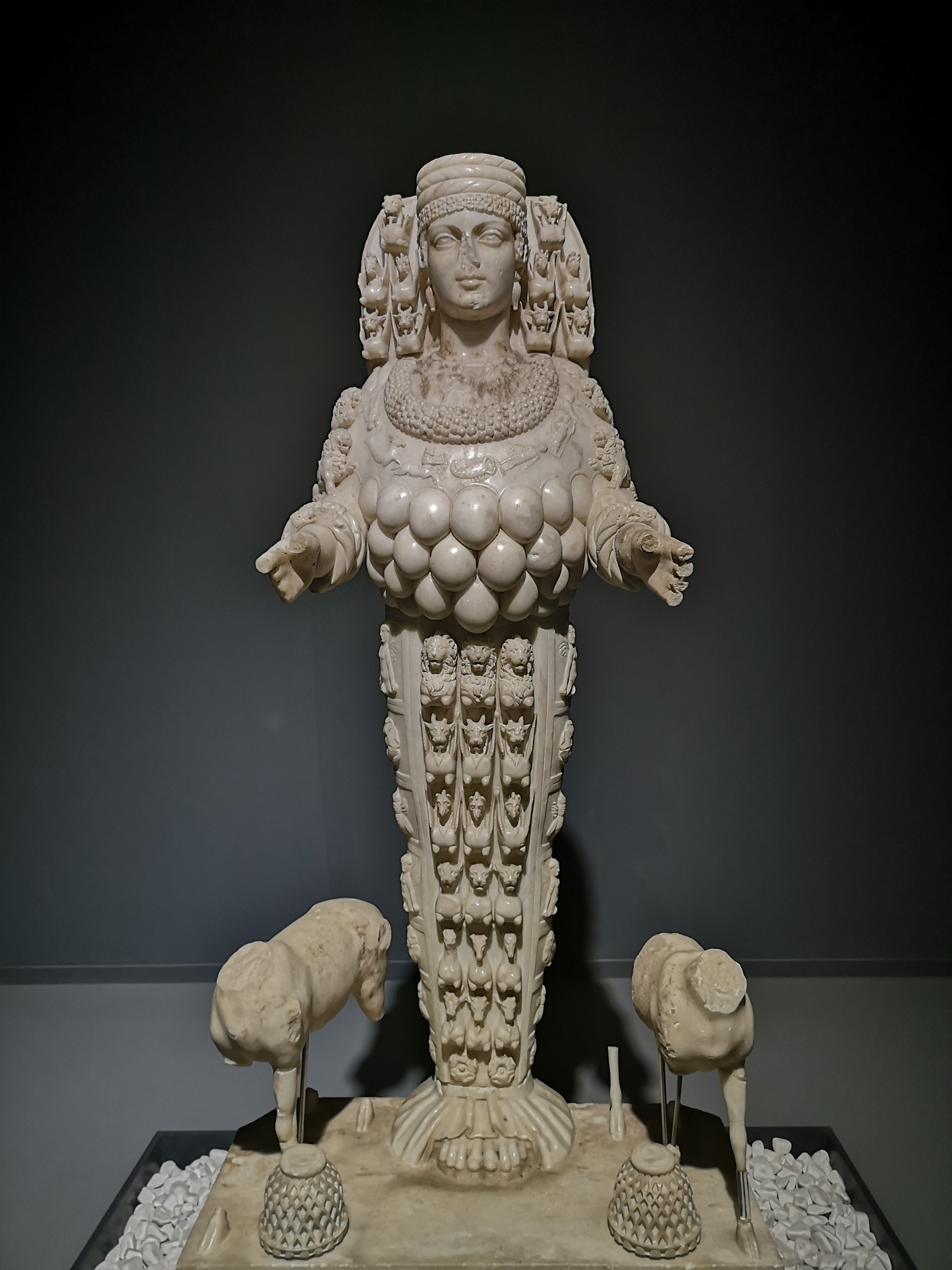
The Lady of Ephesus, 2nd century AD, Ephesus Archaeological Museum

Ephesus continued to prosper, but when taxes were raised under Cambyses II and Darius, the Ephesians participated in the Ionian Revolt against Persian rule in the Battle of Ephesus (498 BC), an event which instigated the Greco-Persian wars. In 479 BC, the Ionians, together with Athens, were able to oust the Persians from the shores of Asia Minor. In 478 BC, the Ionian cities with Athens entered into the Delian League against the Persians. Ephesus did not contribute ships but gave financial support.

During the Peloponnesian War, Ephesus was first allied to Athens but in a later phase, called the Decelean War, or the Ionian War, sided with Sparta, which also had received the support of the Persians. As a result, rule over the cities of Ionia was ceded again to Persia.

These wars did not greatly affect daily life in Ephesus. The Ephesians were surprisingly modern in their social relations: they allowed strangers to integrate and education was valued. In later times, Pliny the Elder mentioned having seen at Ephesus a representation of the goddess Diana by Timarete, the daughter of a painter.

In 356 BC the temple of Artemis was burnt down, according to legend, by a lunatic called Herostratus. The inhabitants of Ephesus at once set about restoring the temple and even planned a larger and grander one than the original.

=== Hellenistic period ===
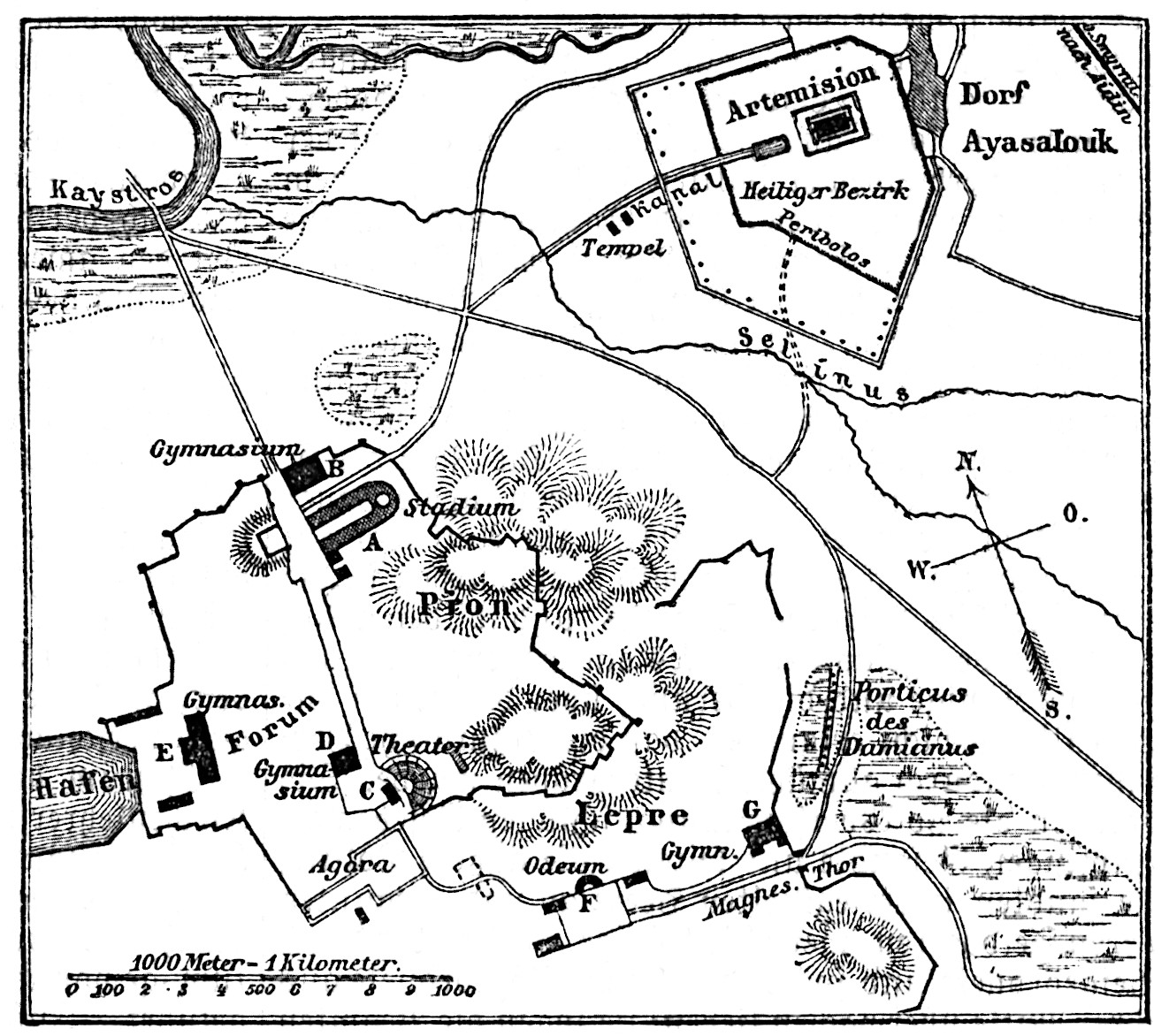
Historical map of Ephesus, from Meyers Konversationslexikon, 1890

When Alexander the Great defeated the Persian forces at the Battle of Granicus in 334 BC, the Greek cities of Asia Minor were liberated. The pro-Persian tyrant Syrpax and his family were stoned to death, and Alexander was greeted warmly when he entered Ephesus in triumph. When Alexander saw that the temple of Artemis was not yet finished, he proposed to finance it and have his name inscribed on the front. But the inhabitants of Ephesus demurred, claiming that it was not fitting for one god to build a temple to another. After Alexander's death in 323 BC, Ephesus in 290 BC came under the rule of one of Alexander's generals, Lysimachus.

As the river Cayster (Grk. name Κάϋστρος) silted up the old harbour, the resulting marshes caused malaria and many deaths among the inhabitants. Lysimachus forced the people to move from the ancient settlement around the temple of Artemis to the present site two kilometres (1.2 miles) away, when as a last resort the king flooded the old city by blocking the sewers. The new settlement was officially called Arsinoea (Ancient Greek: Ἀρσινόεια or Ἀρσινοΐα) or Arsinoe (Ἀρσινόη), after the king's second wife, Arsinoe II of Egypt. After Lysimachus had destroyed the nearby cities of Lebedos and Colophon in 292 BC, he relocated their inhabitants to the new city.

Ephesus revolted after the treacherous death of Agathocles, giving the Hellenistic king of Syria and Mesopotamia Seleucus I Nicator an opportunity for removing and killing Lysimachus, his last rival, at the Battle of Corupedium in 281 BC. After the death of Lysimachus the town again was named Ephesus.

Thus Ephesus became part of the Seleucid Empire. After the murder of king Antiochus II Theos and his Egyptian wife in 246 BC, pharaoh Ptolemy III invaded the Seleucid Empire and the Egyptian fleet swept the coast of Asia Minor. Ephesus was betrayed by its governor Sophron into the hands of the Ptolemies who ruled the city for half a century until 197 BC.

The Seleucid king Antiochus III the Great tried to regain the Greek cities of Asia Minor and recaptured Ephesus in 196 BC but he then came into conflict with Rome. After a series of battles, he was defeated by Scipio Asiaticus at the Battle of Magnesia in 190 BC. As a result of the subsequent Treaty of Apamea, Ephesus came under the rule of Eumenes II, the Attalid king of Pergamon, (ruled 197–159 BC). When his grandson Attalus III died in 133 BC without male children of his own, he left his kingdom to the Roman Republic, on condition that the city of Pergamon be kept free and autonomous.

=== Classical Roman period (129 BC–395 AD) ===
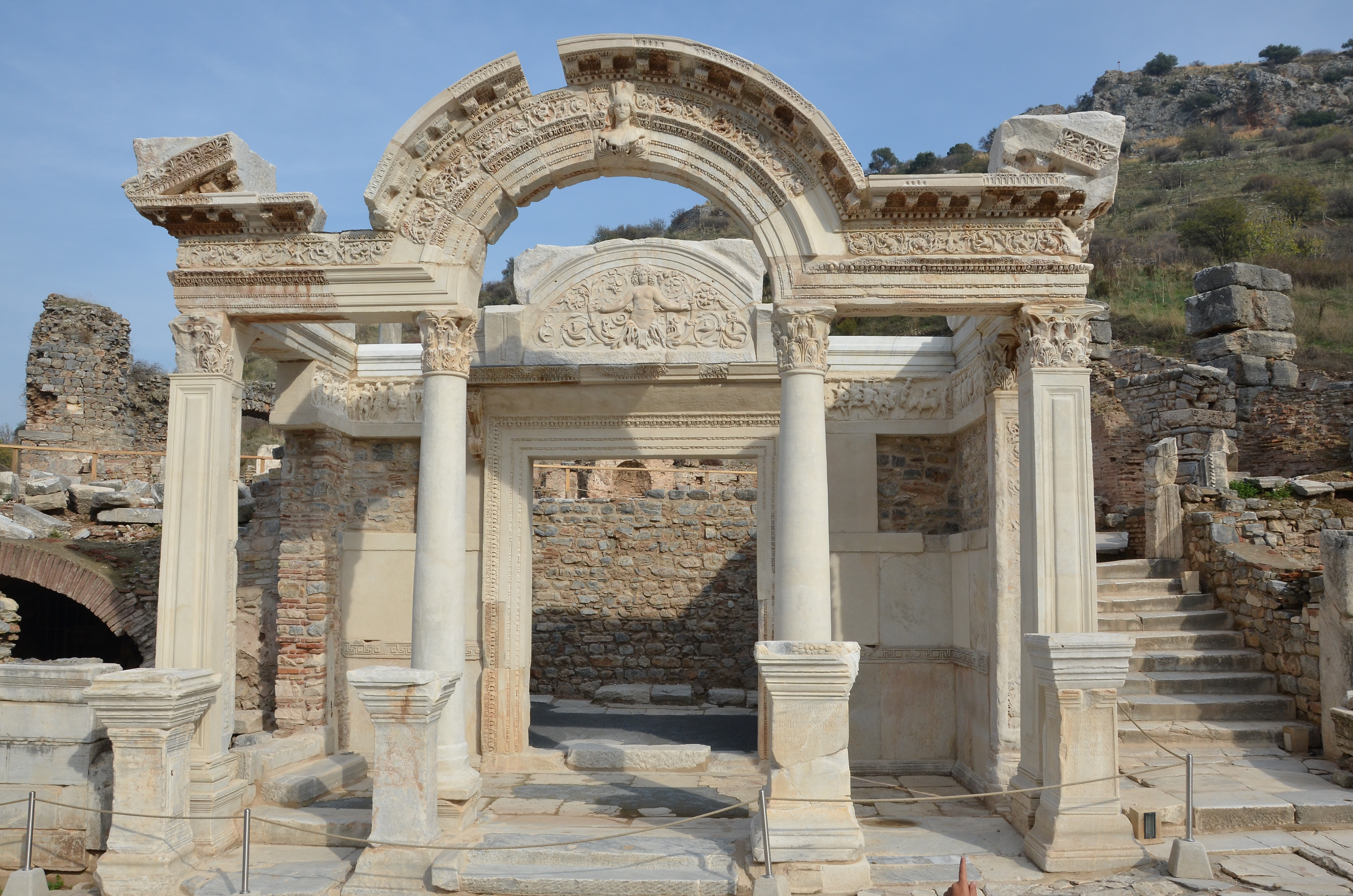
The Temple of Hadrian

Ephesus, as part of the kingdom of Pergamon, became a subject of the Roman Republic in 129 BC after the revolt of Eumenes III was suppressed.

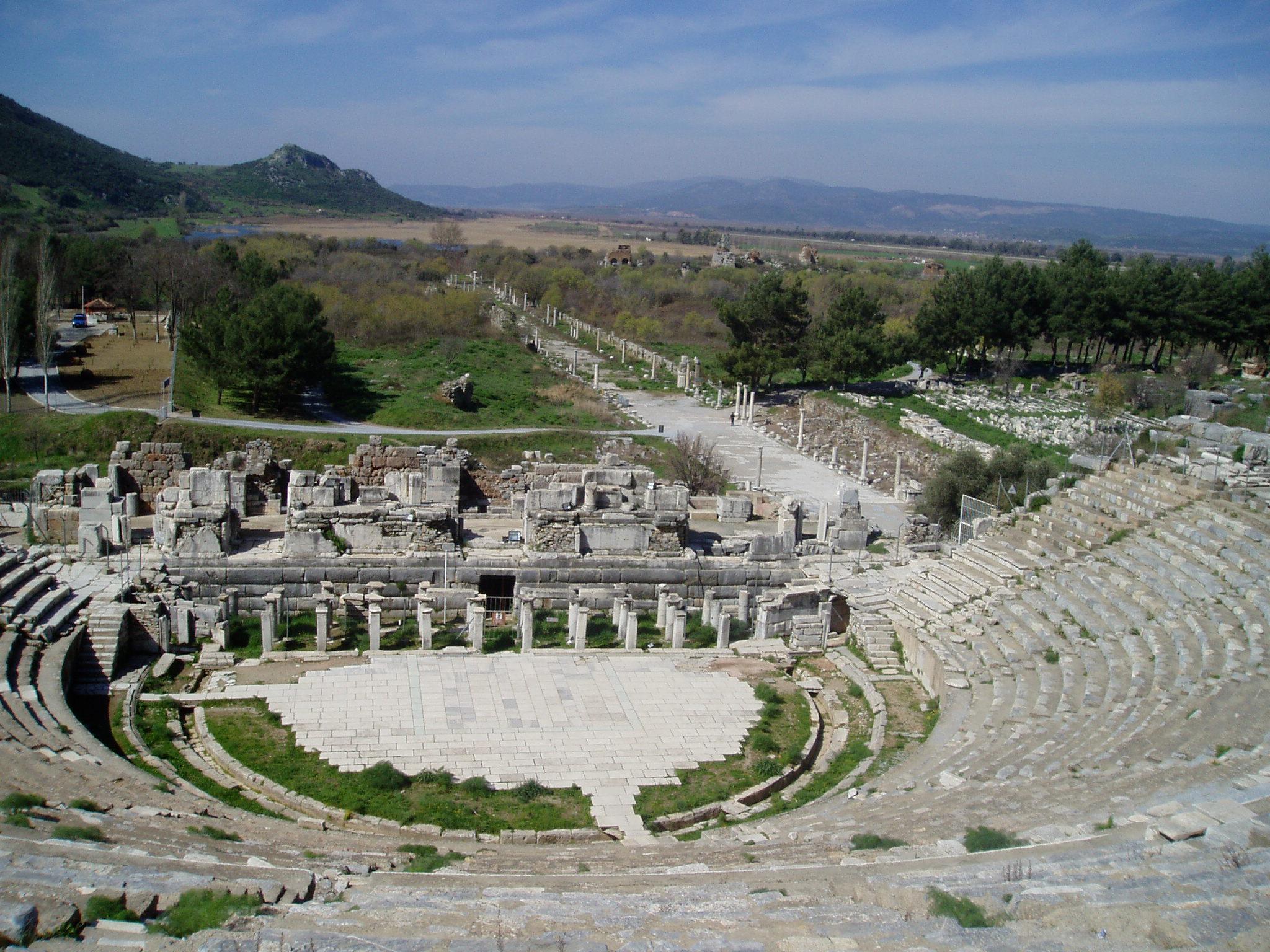
The Theatre of Ephesus with harbour street. Due to ancient and subsequent deforestation, overgrazing (mostly by goat herds), erosion and soil degradation, the Mediterranean coast is now 3–4 km (2–2 mi) away from the site, sediment having filled the plain and the coast. In the background can be seen the muddy remains of the former harbour, barren hill ridges and maquis shrubland.

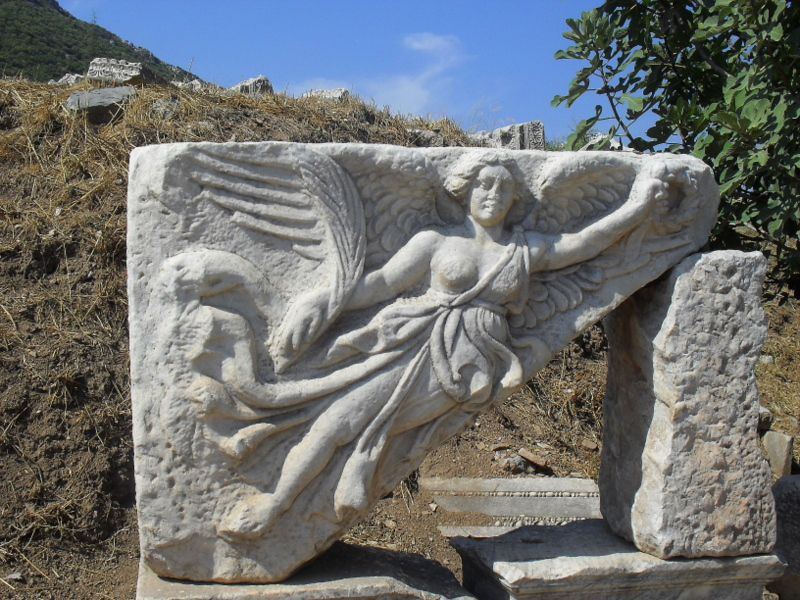
Stone carving of the goddess Nike

The city felt Roman influence at once; taxes rose considerably, and the treasures of the city were systematically plundered. Hence in 88 BC Ephesus welcomed Archelaus, a general of Mithridates, king of Pontus, when he conquered Asia (the Roman name for western Anatolia). From Ephesus, Mithridates ordered every Roman citizen in the province to be killed which led to the Asiatic Vespers, the slaughter of 80,000 Roman citizens in Asia, or any person who spoke with a Latin accent. Many had lived in Ephesus, and statues and monument of Roman citizens in Ephesus were also destroyed. But when they saw how badly the people of Chios had been treated by Zenobius, a general of Mithridates, they refused entry to his army. Zenobius was invited into the city to visit Philopoemen, the father of Monime, the favourite wife of Mithridates, and the overseer of Ephesus. As the people expected nothing good of him, they threw him into prison and murdered him. Mithridates took revenge and inflicted terrible punishments. However, the Greek cities were given freedom and several substantial rights. Ephesus became, for a short time, self-governing. When Mithridates was defeated in the First Mithridatic War by the Roman consul Lucius Cornelius Sulla, Ephesus came back under Roman rule in 86 BC. Sulla imposed a huge indemnity, along with five years of back taxes, which left Asian cities heavily in debt for a long time to come.

King Ptolemy XII Auletes of Egypt retired to Ephesus in 57 BC, passing his time in the sanctuary of the temple of Artemis when the Roman Senate failed to restore him to his throne.

Mark Antony was welcomed by Ephesus for periods when he was proconsul and in 33 BC with Cleopatra when he gathered his fleet of 800 ships before the battle of Actium with Octavius.

When Augustus became emperor in 27 BC, the most important change was when he made Ephesus the capital of proconsular Asia (which covered western Asia Minor) instead of Pergamum. Ephesus then entered an era of prosperity, becoming both the seat of the governor and a major centre of commerce. According to Strabo, it was second in importance and size only to Rome.

The city and temple were destroyed by the Goths in 263 AD. This marked the decline of the city's splendour. However, emperor Constantine the Great rebuilt much of the city and erected new public baths.

==== The Roman population ====
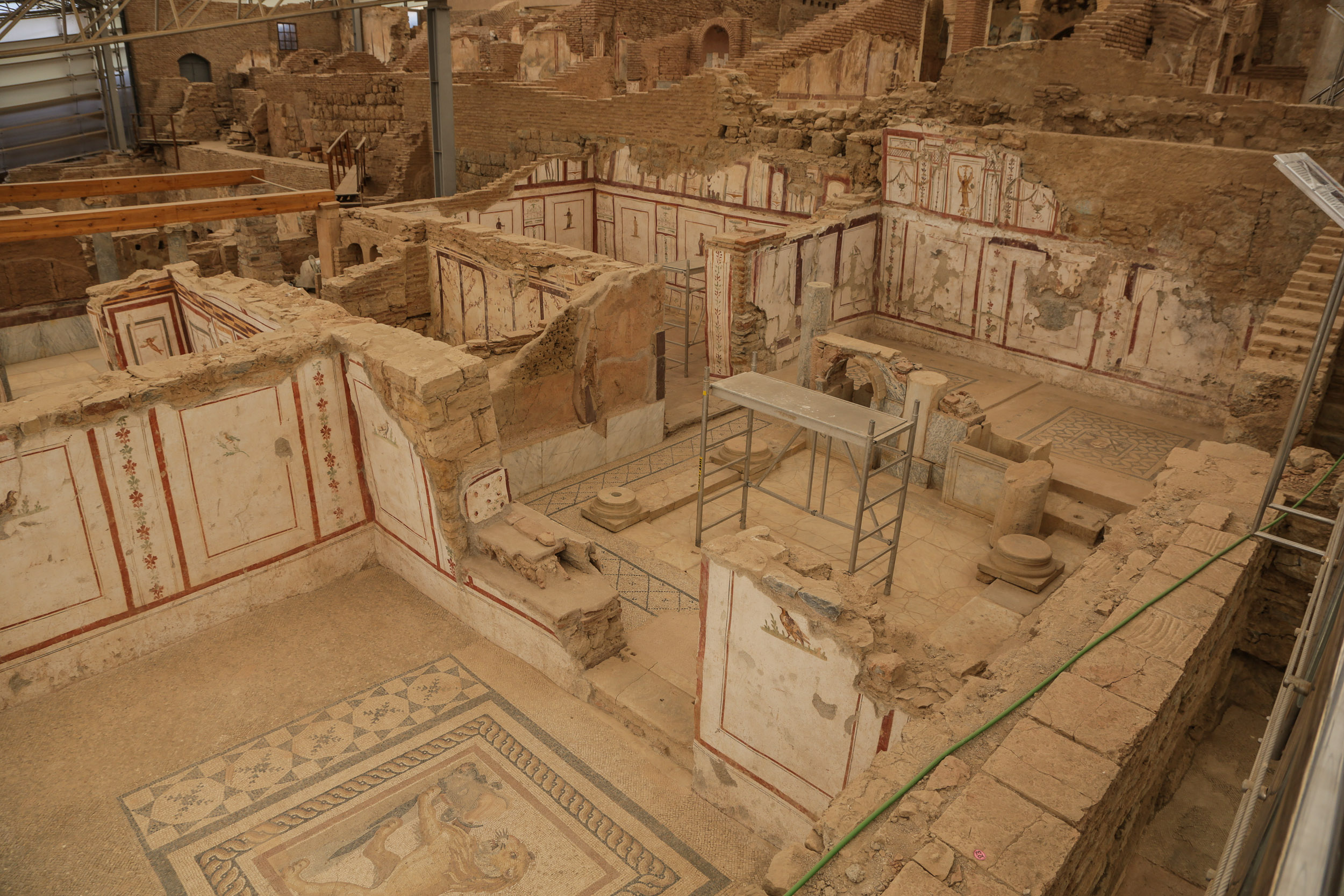
The 'terrace houses' at Ephesus, showing how the wealthy lived during the Roman period. Eventually the harbour became silted up, and the city lost its natural resources.

Until recently, the population of Ephesus in Roman times was estimated to number up to 225,000 people by Broughton. More recent scholarship regards these estimates as unrealistic. Such a large estimate would require population densities seen in only a few ancient cities, or extensive settlement outside the city walls. This would have been impossible at Ephesus because of the mountain ranges, coastline and quarries which surrounded the city.

The wall of Lysimachus has been estimated to enclose an area of 415 hectares (1,030 acres). Not all of this area was inhabited due to public buildings and spaces in the city center and the steep slope of the Bülbül Dağı mountain, which was enclosed by the wall. Ludwig Burchner estimated this area with the walls at 1000 acres. Jerome Murphy-O'Connor uses an estimate of 345 hectares for the inhabited land or 835 acres (Murphey cites Ludwig Burchner). He cites Josiah Russell using 832 acres and Old Jerusalem in 1918 as the yardstick estimated the population at 51,068 at 148.5 persons per hectare. Using 510 persons per hectare, he arrives at a population between 138,000 and 172,500 . J.W. Hanson estimated the inhabited space to be smaller, at 224 hectares (550 acres). He argues that population densities of 150~250 people per hectare are more realistic, which gives a range of 33,600–56,000 inhabitants. Even with these much lower population estimates, Ephesus was one of the largest cities of Roman Asia Minor, ranking it as the largest city after Sardis and Alexandria Troas. Hanson and Ortman (2017) estimate an inhabited area to be 263 hectares and their demographic model yields an estimate of 71,587 inhabitants, with a population density of 276 inhabitants per hectare. By contrast, Rome within the walls encompassed 1,500 hectares and as over 400 built-up hectares were left outside the Aurelian Wall, whose construction was begun in 274 AD and finished in 279 AD, the total inhabited area plus public spaces inside the walls consisted of ca. 1,900 hectares. Imperial Rome had a population estimated to be between 750,000 and one million (Hanson and Ortman's (2017) model yields an estimate of 923,406 inhabitants), which imply in a population density of 395 to 526 inhabitants per hectare, including public spaces.

=== Byzantine Roman period (395–1308) ===
Ephesus remained the most important city of the Byzantine Empire in Asia after Constantinople in the 5th and 6th centuries. Emperor Flavius Arcadius raised the level of the street between the theatre and the harbour. The basilica of St. John was built during the reign of emperor Justinian I in the 6th century.

Excavations in 2022 indicate that large parts of the city were destroyed in 614/615 by a military conflict, most likely during the Sasanian War, which initiated a drastic decline in the city's population and standard of living.

The importance of the city as a commercial centre further declined as the harbour, today 5 kilometres inland, was slowly silted up by the river (today, Küçük Menderes) despite repeated dredging during the city's history. The loss of its harbour caused Ephesus to lose its access to the Aegean Sea, which was important for trade. Sackings by the Arabs first in the year 654–655 by caliph Muawiyah I, and later in 700 and 716 hastened the decline further. In 781, the Tayyaye Arabs attacked Ephesus and carried away about 7,000 captives.

The city became part of the Thracesian Theme in the 7th century and was also known as Hagios Theologos. According to Persian geographer Ibn Khordadbeh, who wrote in 847, Ephesus served as the theme's capital (but that is not certain, as the capital could have instead been at Chonae).

The city seems to have prospered again as a place of craftsmen and merchants, with a port and market that generated a revenue of 100 pounds of gold per year in taxes during the reign of Constantine VI. Ephesus became part of the Theme of Samos in the late 9th century and was the seat of one of the two tourmarchai of the theme (the other one was in Adramyttion). The Seljuks conquered and plundered Ephesus in 1090, but the Byzantines resumed control in 1097. Ephesus became one of the cities in Asia Minor where Venetian traders were granted commercial privileges by Alexios I Komnenos.

The Crusaders of the Second Crusade fought the Seljuks just outside the city in December 1147. In 1206, Ephesus came under the control of the Laskaris. It was an important religious and intellectual center during the 13th century. Nikephoros Blemmydes, a prominent intellectual of the time, taught in the city. However, the Byzantines lost control of the region by 1308.

=== Pre-Ottoman period (1304–1390) ===
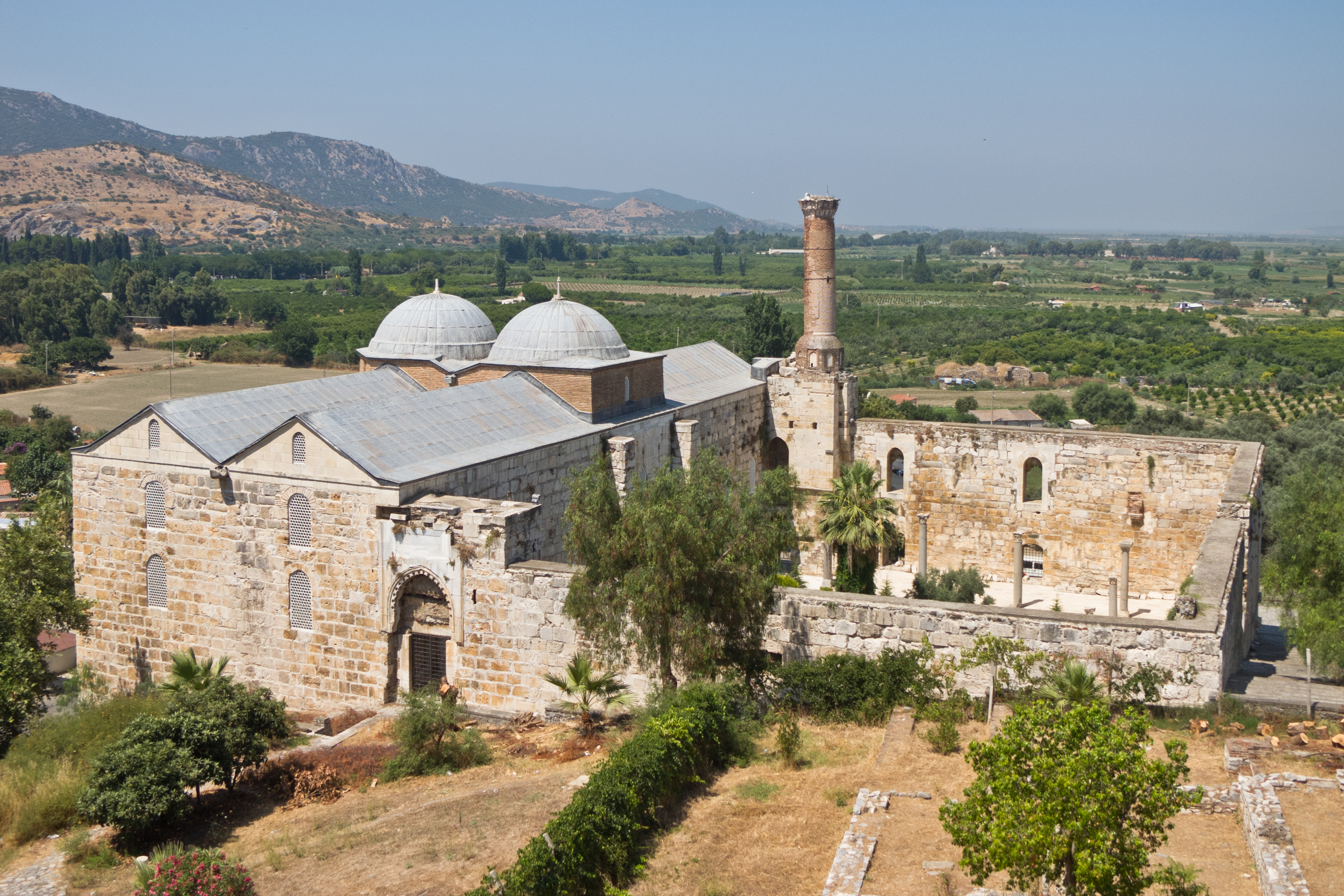
The İsa Bey Mosque constructed in 1374–75, is one of the oldest and most impressive remains from the Anatolian beyliks.

On 24 October 1304, the town surrendered to Sasa Bey, a Turkish warlord of the Menteşoğulları Beylik. Contrary to the terms of the surrender, the Turks pillaged the church of Saint John and, when a revolt seemed probable, deported most of the local population to Thyrea. During these events, many of the remaining inhabitants were massacred.

Shortly afterwards, Ephesus was ceded to the Aydinid principality that stationed a powerful navy in the harbour of Ayasuluğ (the present-day Selçuk, next to Ephesus). Ayasoluk became an important harbour, from which piratical raids on the surrounding Christian regions were organised, some officially sanctioned by the state and some by private parties.

The town knew a short period of prosperity again during the 14th century under these new Seljuk rulers. They added important architectural works such as the İsa Bey Mosque, caravansaries, and hamams (bathhouses).

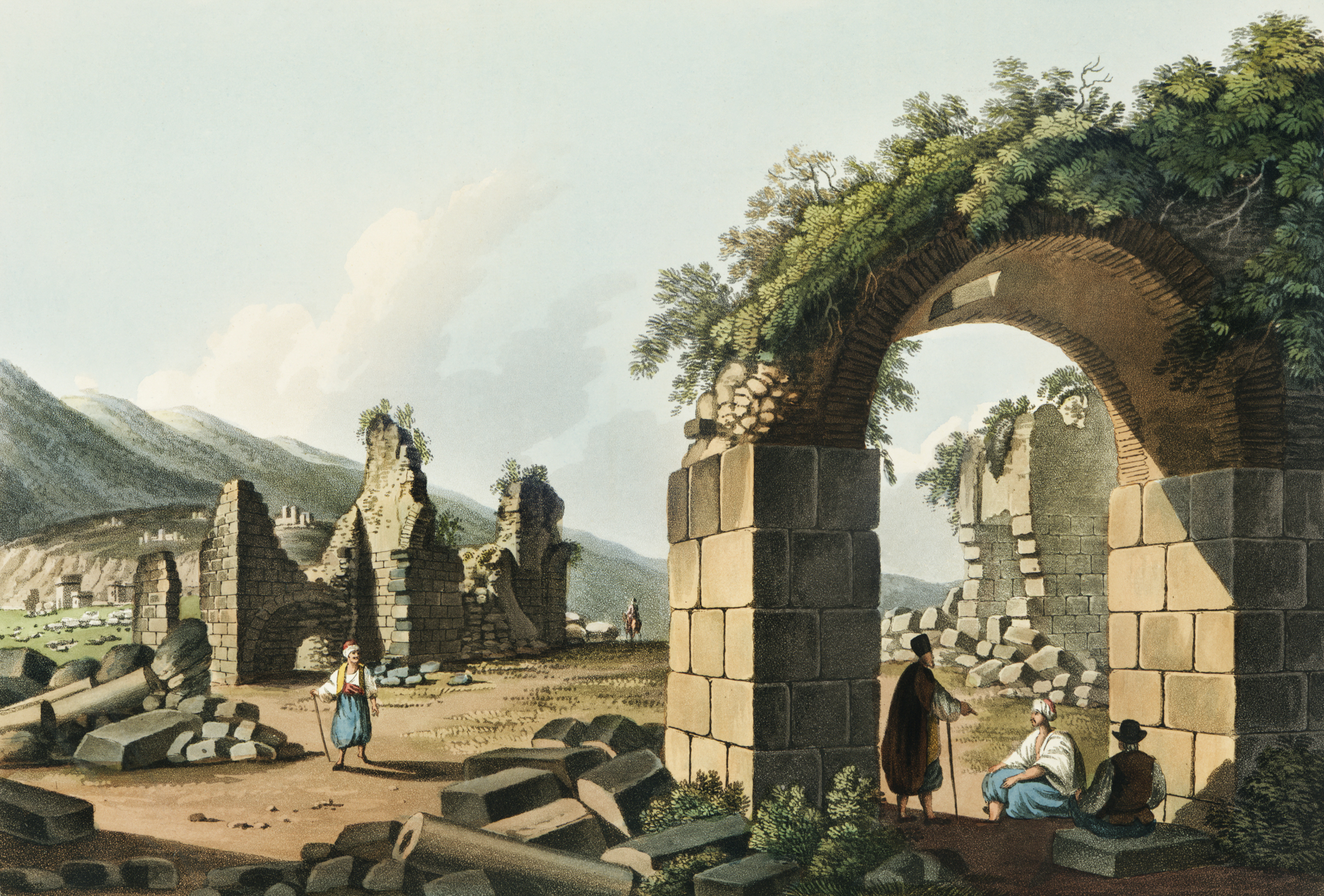
Ruins of the baths at Ephesus, by Luigi Mayer

=== Ottoman period ===
Ephesians were incorporated as vassals into the Ottoman Empire for the first time in 1390. The Central Asian warlord Tamerlane defeated the Ottomans in Anatolia in 1402, and the Ottoman sultan Bayezid I died in captivity. The region was restored to the Anatolian beyliks. After a period of unrest, the region was again incorporated into the Ottoman Empire in 1425.

Ephesus was completely abandoned by the 15th century. Nearby Ayasuluğ (Ayasoluk being a corrupted form of the original Greek name) was turkified to Selçuk in 1914.

== Ephesus and Christianity ==
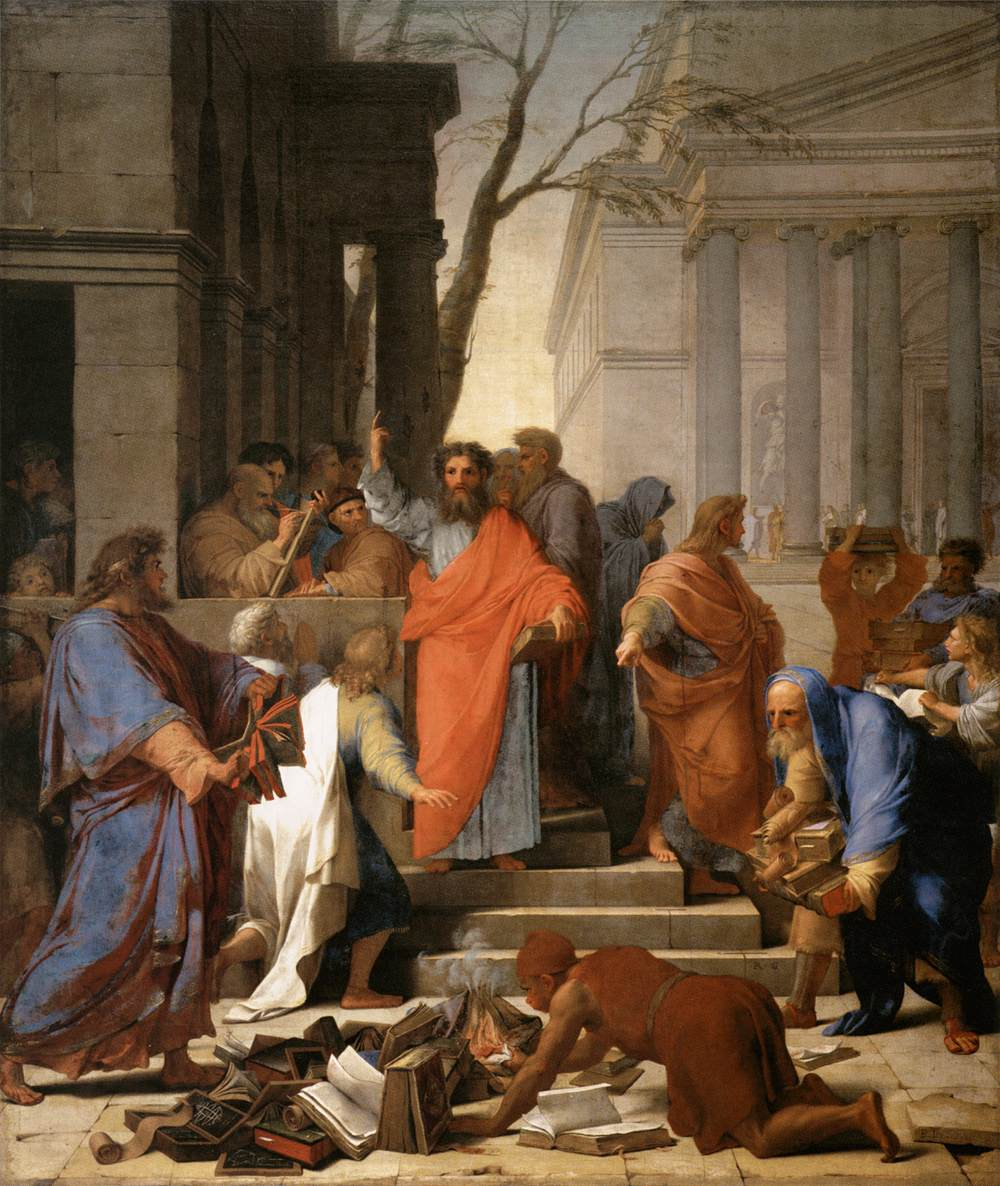
The Preaching of Saint Paul at Ephesus, Eustache Le Sueur, 1649

Ephesus was an important centre for Early Christianity from the AD 50s. From AD 52–54, the apostle Paul lived for three years in Ephesus, working with the congregation and organizing missionary activity into the hinterlands. Initially, according to the Acts of the Apostles, Paul attended the Jewish synagogue in Ephesus, but after three months he became frustrated with the stubbornness of some of the Jews, and moved his base to the school of Tyrannus. The Jamieson-Fausset-Brown Bible Commentary reminds readers that the unbelief of "some" (Greek: τινες) implies that "others, probably a large number, believed" and therefore there must have been a community of Jewish Christians in Ephesus. Paul introduced about twelve men to the 'baptism with the Holy Spirit' who had previously only experienced the baptism of John the Baptist. A silversmith named Demetrius stirred up a mob against him, arguing that his teaching that handmade objects are not divine threatened the livelihood of those who crafted silver shrines of Artemis, and beyond that, the honor of the goddess and her temple. The crowd surged to the city theater, seized two of Paul's companions, and filled the air with chants before the town clerk restored order by warning that the unrest risked inviting a charge of sedition from Roman authorities. Between 53 and 57 AD Paul wrote the letter 1 Corinthians from Ephesus (possibly from the 'Paul tower' near the harbour, where he was imprisoned for a short time). Later, Paul wrote the Epistle to the Ephesians while he was in prison in Rome (around 62 AD).

Roman Asia was also associated with John, one of the chief apostles, and the Gospel of John might have been written in Ephesus, c 90–100. John is said to have died of natural causes at Ephesus sometime after AD 98, during the reign of Trajan, thus becoming the only apostle who did not die as a martyr. His tomb is thought to be located in the former Basilica of St. John at Selçuk, a small town in the vicinity of Ephesus. Ephesus was one of the seven cities addressed in the Book of Revelation, indicating that the church at Ephesus was strong.

According to Eusebius of Caesarea, Saint Timothy, the companion of Saint Paul, was the first bishop of Ephesus.

In the early 2nd century, the church at Ephesus was still important enough to be addressed by a letter written by Bishop Ignatius of Antioch to the Ephesians which begins with "Ignatius, who is also called Theophorus, to the Church which is at Ephesus, in Asia, deservedly most happy, being blessed in the greatness and fullness of God the Father, and predestinated before the beginning of time, that it should be always for an enduring and unchangeable glory" (Letter to the Ephesians). The church at Ephesus had given their support for Ignatius, who was taken to Rome for execution.

Polycrates of Ephesus (Greek: Πολυκράτης) was a bishop at the Church of Ephesus in the 2nd century. He is best known for his letter addressed to the Pope Victor I, Bishop of Rome, defending the Quartodeciman position in the Easter controversy.

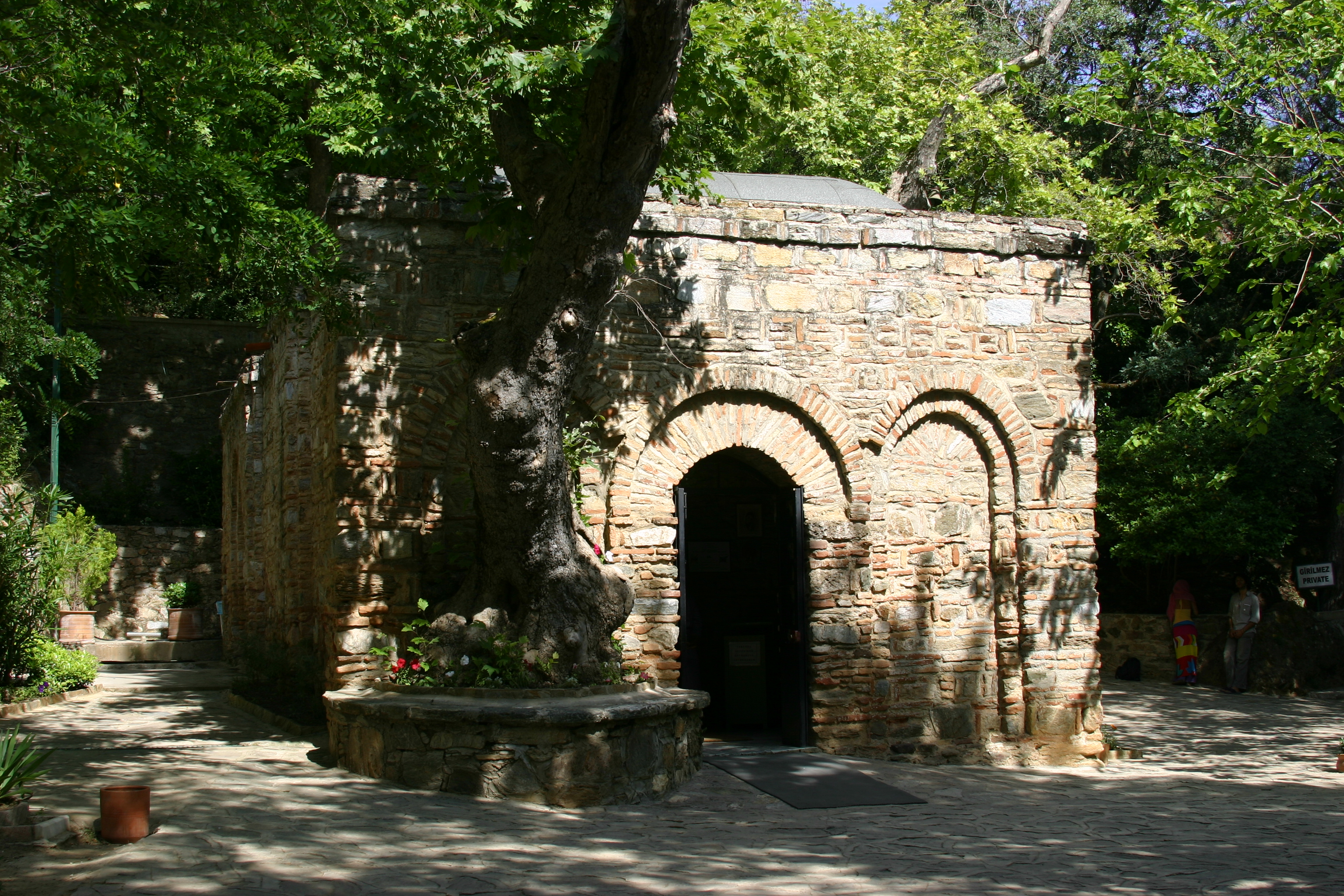
House of the Virgin Mary

A legend, which was first mentioned by Epiphanius of Salamis in the 4th century, purported that Mary, the mother of Jesus, may have spent the last years of her life in Ephesus. The Ephesians derived the argument from John's presence in the city, and Jesus's instructions to the "disciple whom he loved" to take care of his mother, Mary, after his death. Epiphanius, however, claimed that while the Bible says John was leaving for Asia, it does not say specifically that Mary went with him. He later stated that she was buried in Jerusalem. Since the 19th century, The House of the Virgin Mary, about 7 km (4 mi) from Selçuk, has been considered to have been the last home of Mary, mother of Jesus, before her assumption into heaven in the Roman Catholic tradition, based on the visions of Augustinian sister the Blessed Anne Catherine Emmerich (1774–1824). It is a popular place of Catholic pilgrimage which has been visited by three recent popes.

The Church of Mary near the harbour of Ephesus was the setting for the Third Ecumenical Council in 431, which resulted in the condemnation of Nestorius. A Second Council of Ephesus was held in 449, but its controversial acts were never approved by the Catholics. It came to be called the Robber Council of Ephesus or Robber Synod of Latrocinium by its opponents.

=== Seven Sleepers ===
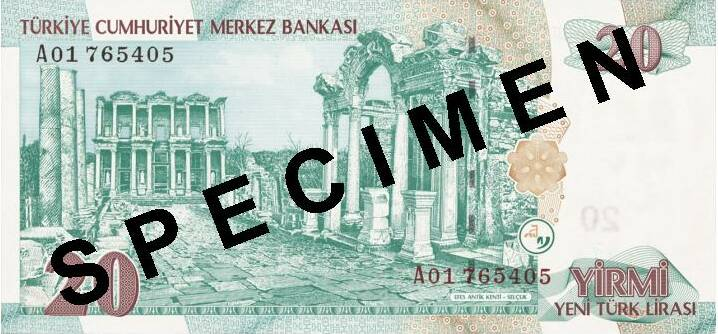
Image of Ephesus on the reverse of the 20 new lira banknote (2005–2008)

Ephesus is believed to be the city of the Seven Sleepers, who were persecuted by the Roman emperor Decius because of their Christianity, and they slept in a cave for three centuries, outlasting their persecution.

They are considered saints by Catholics and Orthodox Christians and their story is also mentioned in the Qur'an.

== Main sites ==
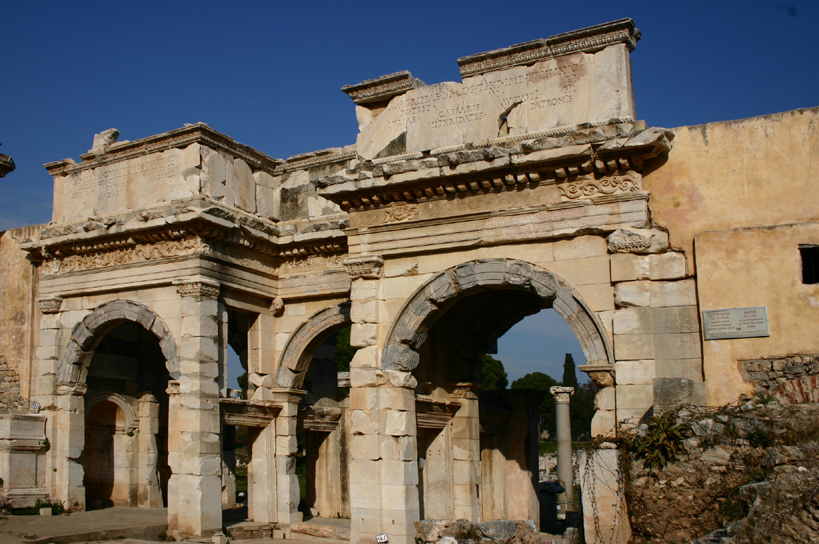
The Gate of Augustus in Ephesus was built to honor the Emperor Augustus and his family.

Ephesus is one of the largest Roman archaeological sites in the eastern Mediterranean. The visible ruins still give some idea of the city's original splendour, and the names associated with the ruins are evocative of its former life. The theatre dominates the view down Harbour Street, which leads to the silted-up harbour.

=== Temple of Artemis ===
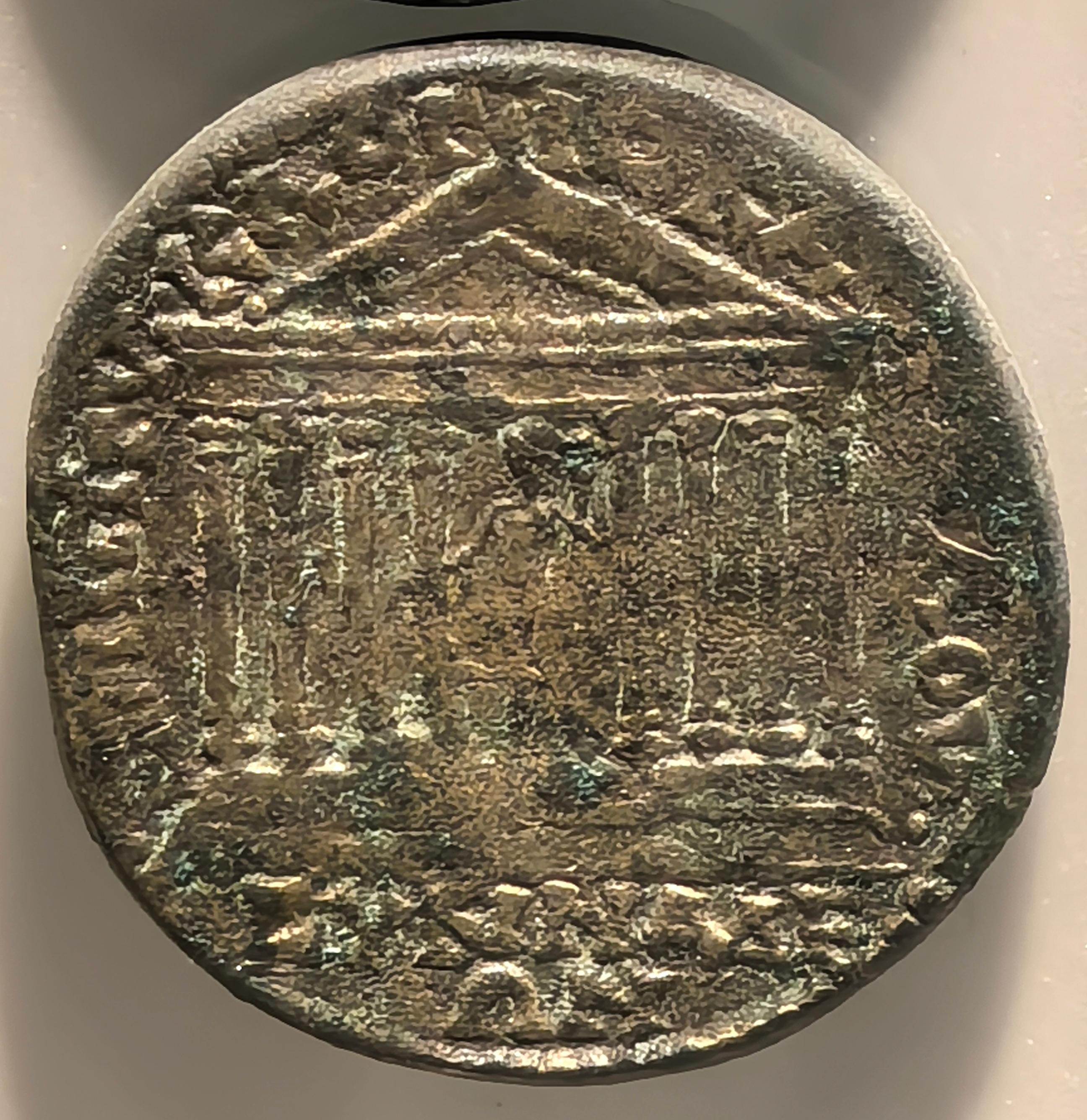
Coin found at Ephesus depicting the Temple of Artemis

The Temple of Artemis, one of the Seven Wonders of the Ancient World, once stood 418' by 239' with over 100 marble pillars each 56' high. The temple earned the city the title "Servant of the Goddess". Pliny tells us that the magnificent structure took 120 years to build, but it is now represented only by one inconspicuous column, revealed during an archaeological excavation by the British Museum in the 1870s. Some fragments of the frieze (which are insufficient to suggest the form of the original) and other small finds were removed – some to London and some to the İstanbul Archaeology Museums.

=== Library of Celsus ===
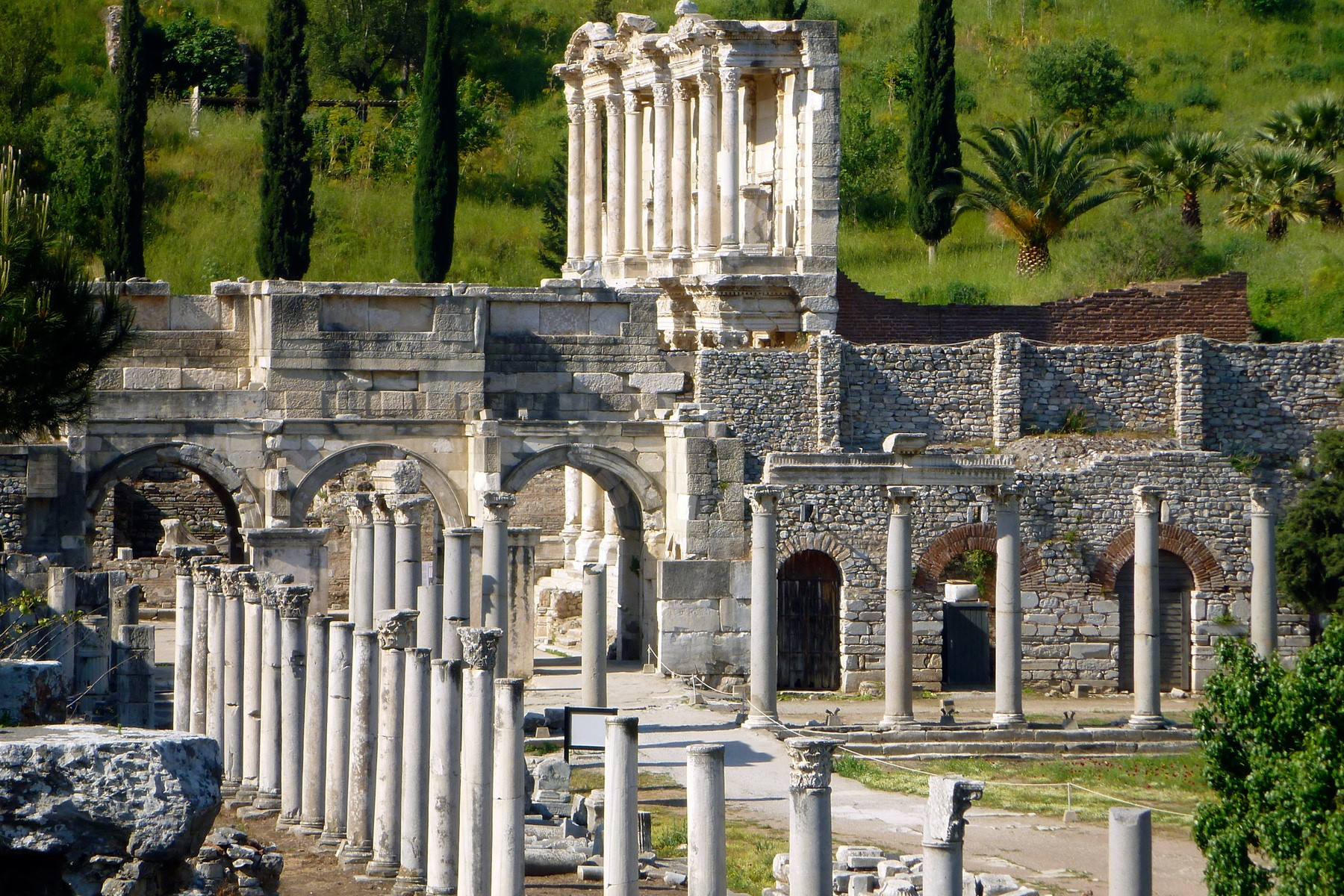
Library of Celsus, side view

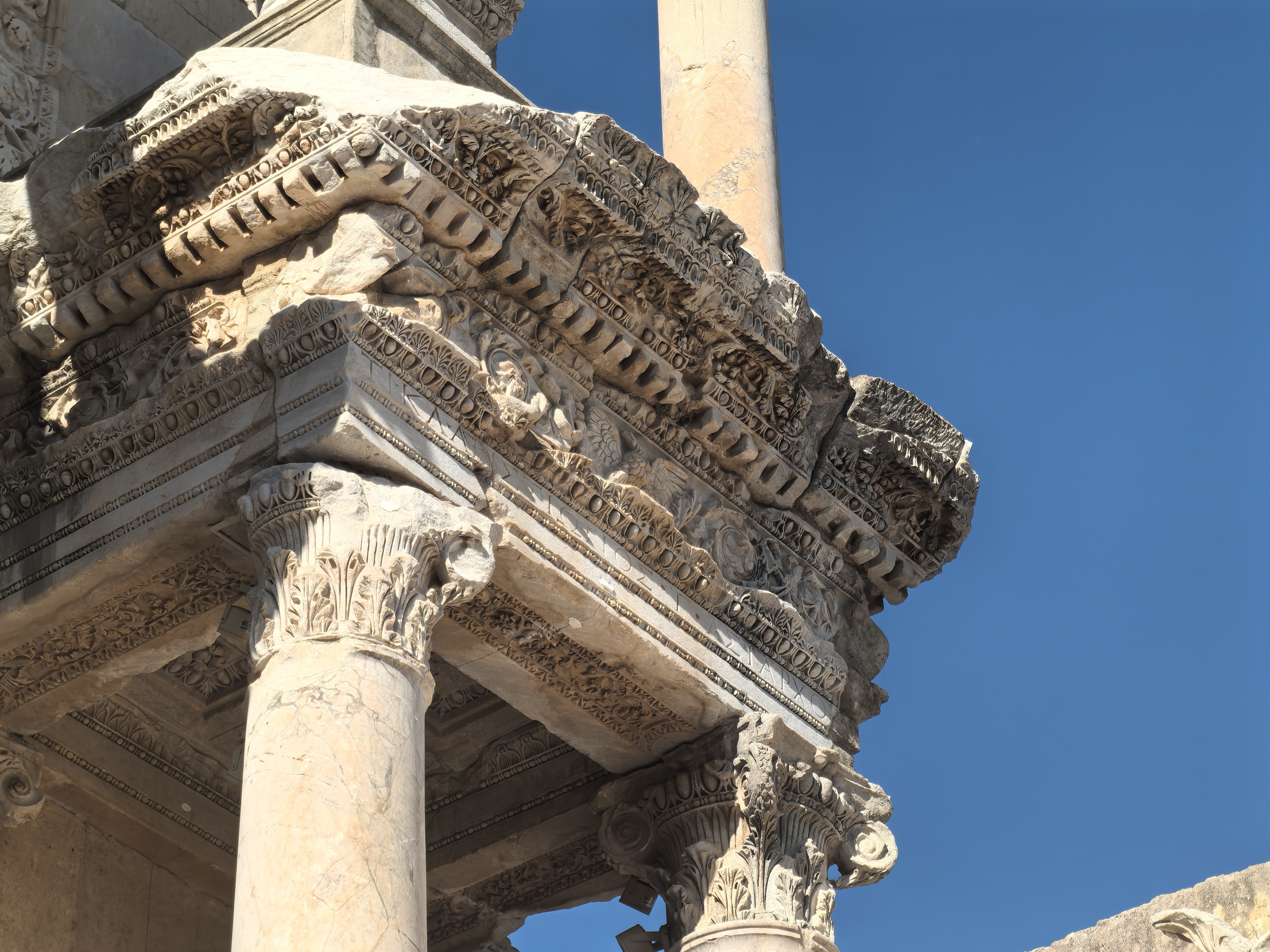
Library of Celsus, details

The Library of Celsus, the façade of which has been carefully reconstructed from original pieces, was originally built c. 125 in memory of Tiberius Julius Celsus Polemaeanus, an Ancient Greek who served as governor of Roman Asia (105–107 AD) in the Roman Empire. Celsus paid for the construction of the library with his own personal wealth and is buried in a sarcophagus beneath it. The library was mostly built by his son Gaius Julius Aquila and once held nearly 12,000 scrolls. Designed with an exaggerated entrance — so as to enhance its perceived size, speculate many historians — the building faces east so that the reading rooms could make best use of the morning light.

The interior of the library measured roughly 180 square metres (1,900 square feet) and may have contained as many as 12,000 scrolls. By the year 400 A.D. the library was no longer in use after being damaged in 262 A.D. The facade was reconstructed during 1970 to 1978 using fragments found on site or copies of fragments that were previously removed to museums.

=== Great Theatre ===
The Great Theatre, with an estimated 25,000 seating capacity, is believed to be the largest in the ancient world. This open-air theatre was used initially for drama, but during later Roman times gladiatorial combats were also held on its stage; the first archaeological evidence of a gladiator graveyard was found in May 2007.

=== Agoras ===
There were two agoras, one for commercial and one for state business.

=== Bath complexes ===
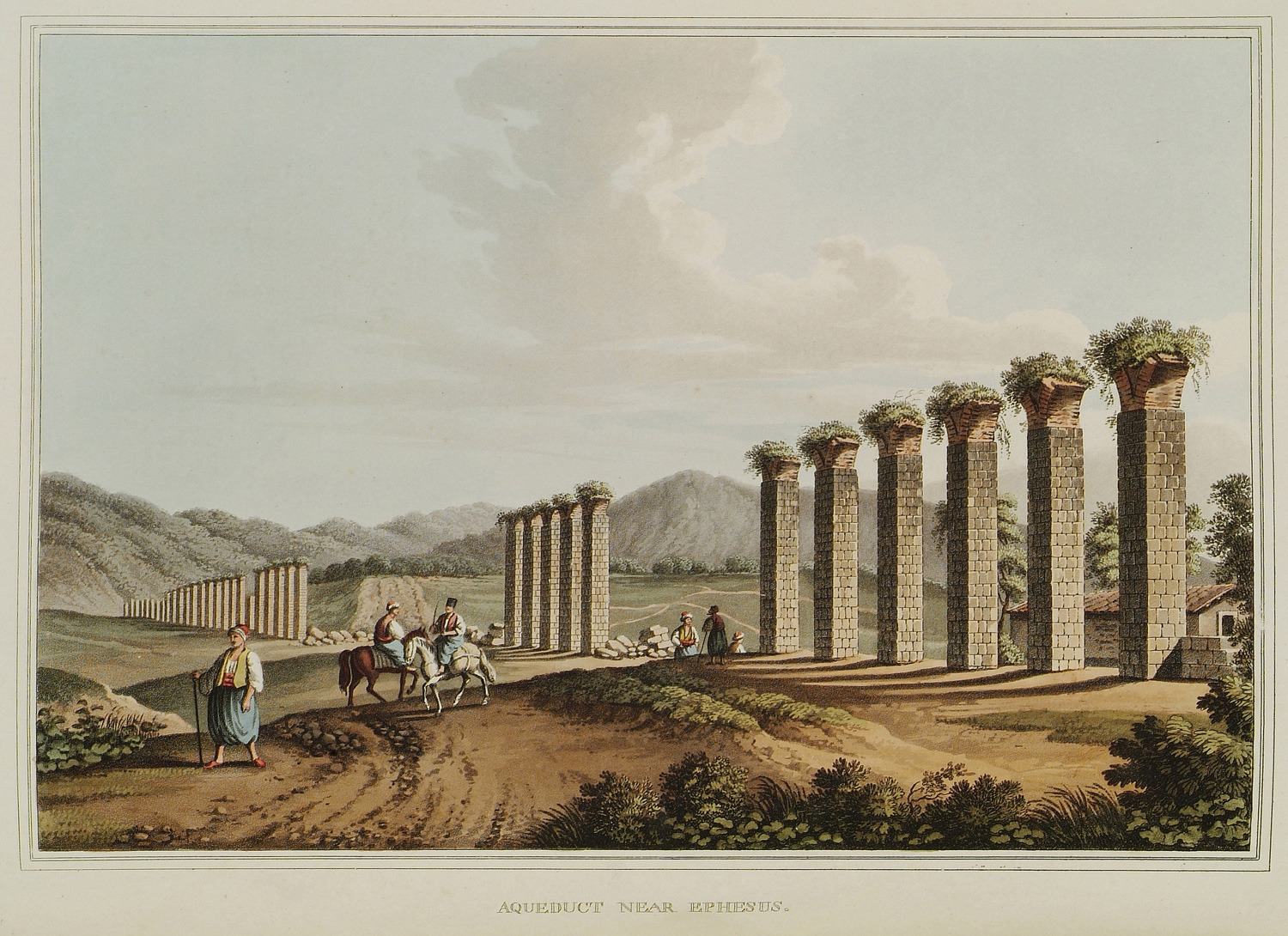
Aqueduct near Ephesus – Mayer Luigi – 1810

Ephesus also had several major bath complexes, built at various times while the city was under Roman rule.

The city had one of the most advanced aqueduct systems in the ancient world, with at least six aqueducts of various sizes supplying different areas of the city. They fed a number of water mills, one of which has been identified as a sawmill for marble.

=== Odeon ===
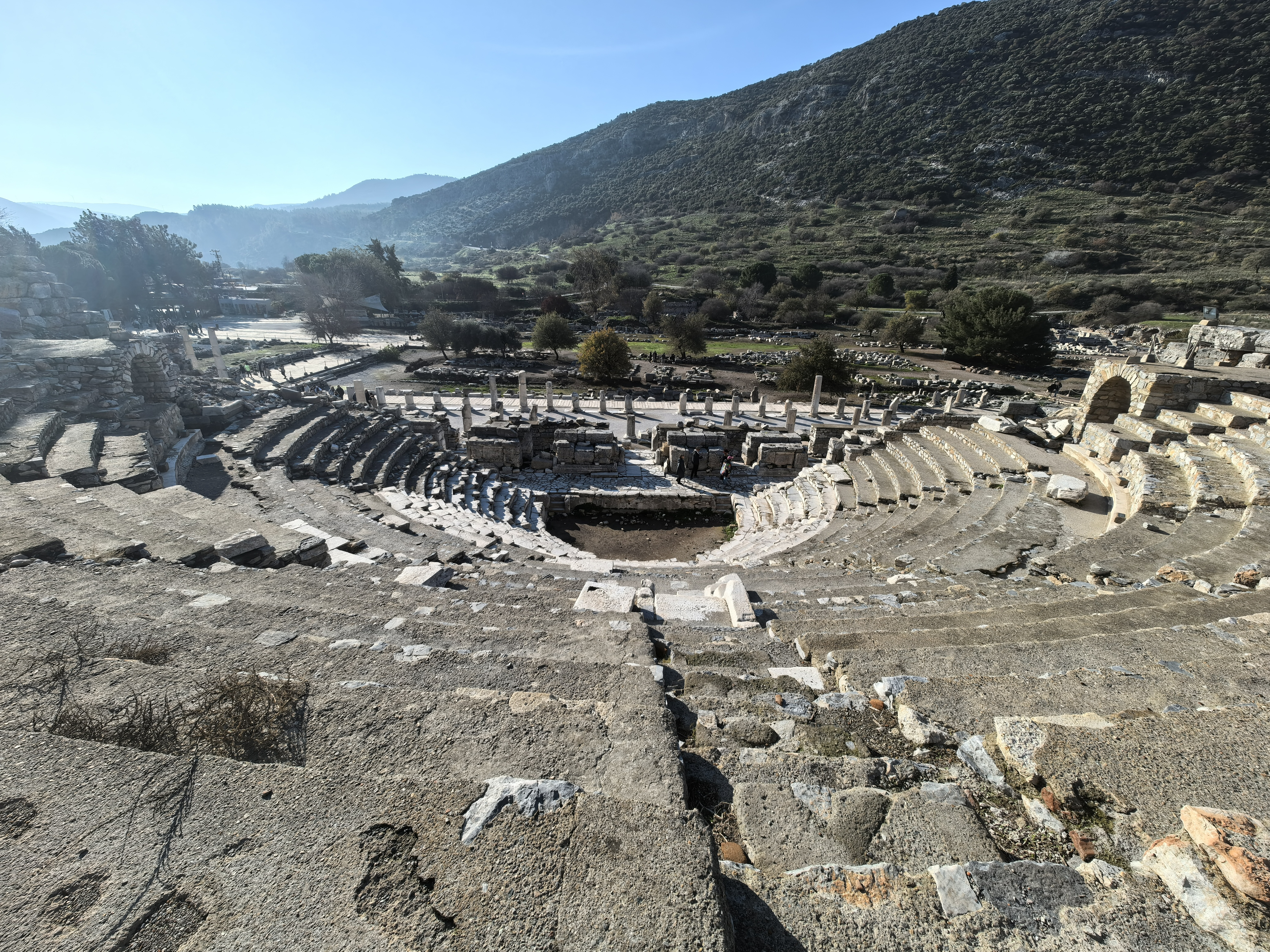
Odeon of Ephesus

The Odeon was a small roofed theatre constructed by Publius Vedius Antoninus and his wife around 150 AD. It was a small salon for plays and concerts, seating about 1,500 people. There were 22 stairs in the theatre. The upper part of the theatre was decorated with red granite pillars in the Corinthian style. The entrances were at both sides of the stage and reached by a few steps.

=== Temple of Hadrian ===
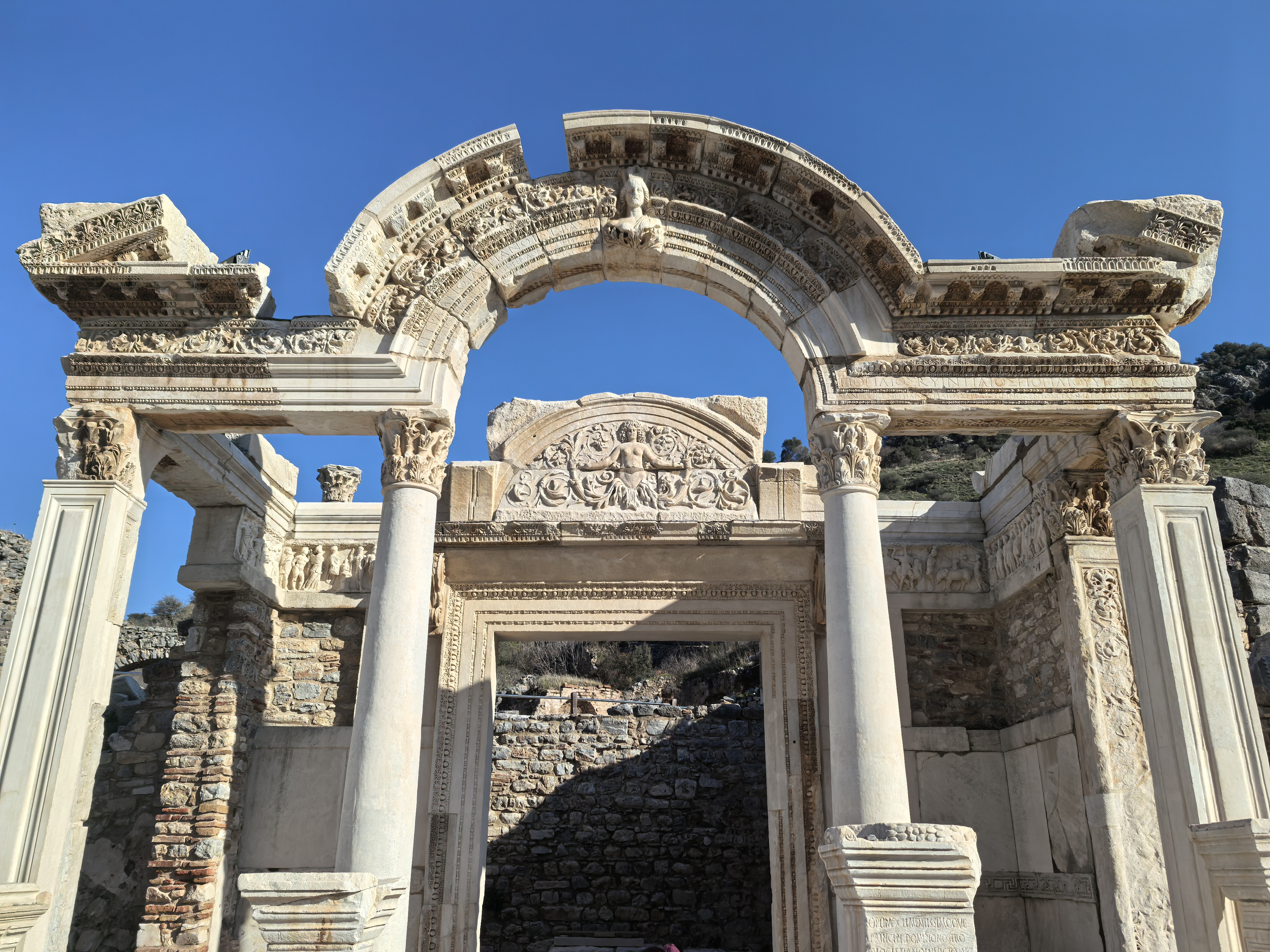
Temple of Hadrian at Ephesus

The Temple of Hadrian dates from the 2nd century but underwent repairs in the 4th century and has been reerected from the surviving architectural fragments. The reliefs in the upper sections are casts, the originals now being exhibited in the Ephesus Archaeological Museum. A number of figures are depicted in the reliefs, including the emperor Theodosius I with his wife and eldest son. The temple was depicted on the reverse of the Turkish 20 million lira banknote of 2001–2005 and of the 20 new lira banknote of 2005–2009.

=== Terrace Houses ===
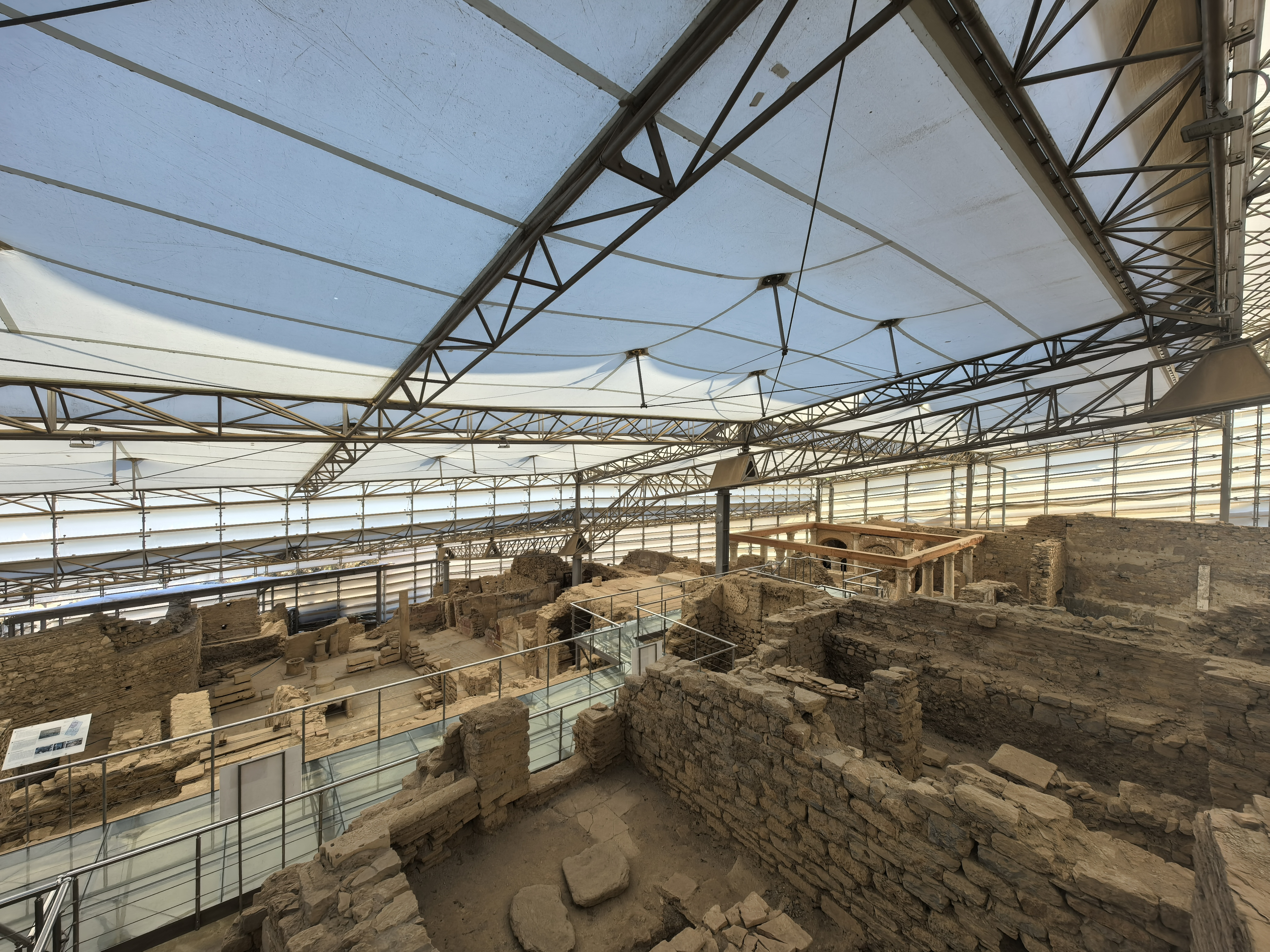
Terrace Houses at Ephesus with the protective roofing above them.

On a slope opposite the Hadrian Temple, the Terrace Houses also called as "The Houses of the Rich" includes six luxury Roman residences, featuring mosaics on the floor and frescos on the wall. Built on three terraces at the lower end of the slope of Bulbul Mountain, they were built according to the Hippodamian plan of the city in which roads transected each other at the right angles. The oldest structure dates to the first century BC, and some of them were in use until the seventh century AD. The discovery and excavations of them shed light on the family life during the Roman period. Today, Ephesus terrace houses are covered with protective roofing.

=== Temple of the Sebastoi ===
The Temple of the Sebastoi (sometimes called the Temple of Domitian), dedicated to the Flavian dynasty, was one of the largest temples in the city. It was erected on a pseudodipteral plan with 8 × 13 columns. The temple and its statue are some of the few remains connected with Domitian.

=== Tomb/Fountain of Pollio ===
The Tomb/Fountain of Pollio was erected in 97 AD in honour of C. Sextilius Pollio, who constructed the Marnas aqueduct, by Offilius Proculus. It has a concave façade.

=== Basilica of St. John ===
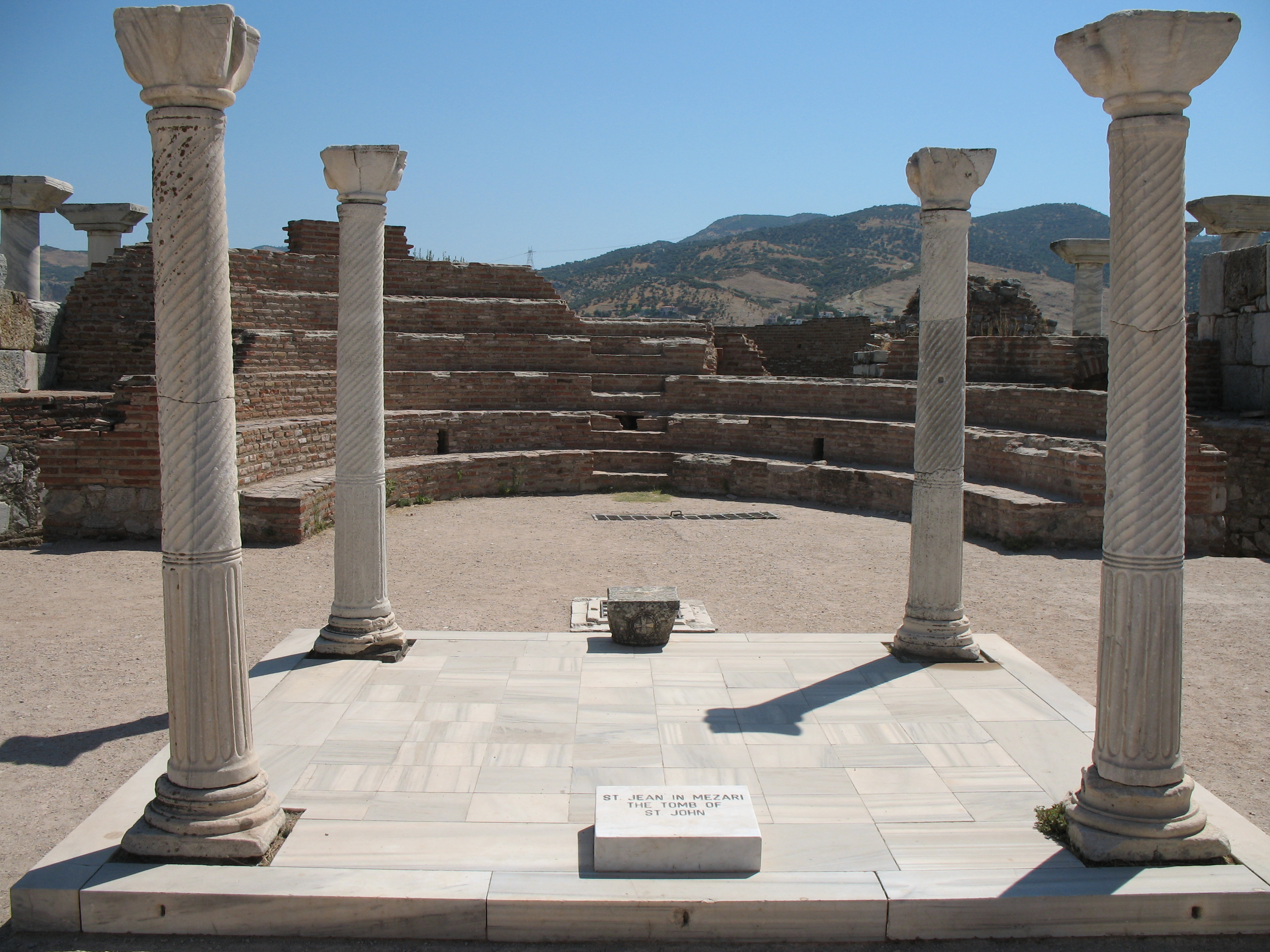
Tomb of John the Apostle at the Basilica of St. John.

A part of the site, Basilica of St. John, was built in the 6th century, under emperor Justinian I, over the supposed site of the apostle's tomb. It is now surrounded by Selçuk.

== Archaeology ==
Historical topography of Ephesos

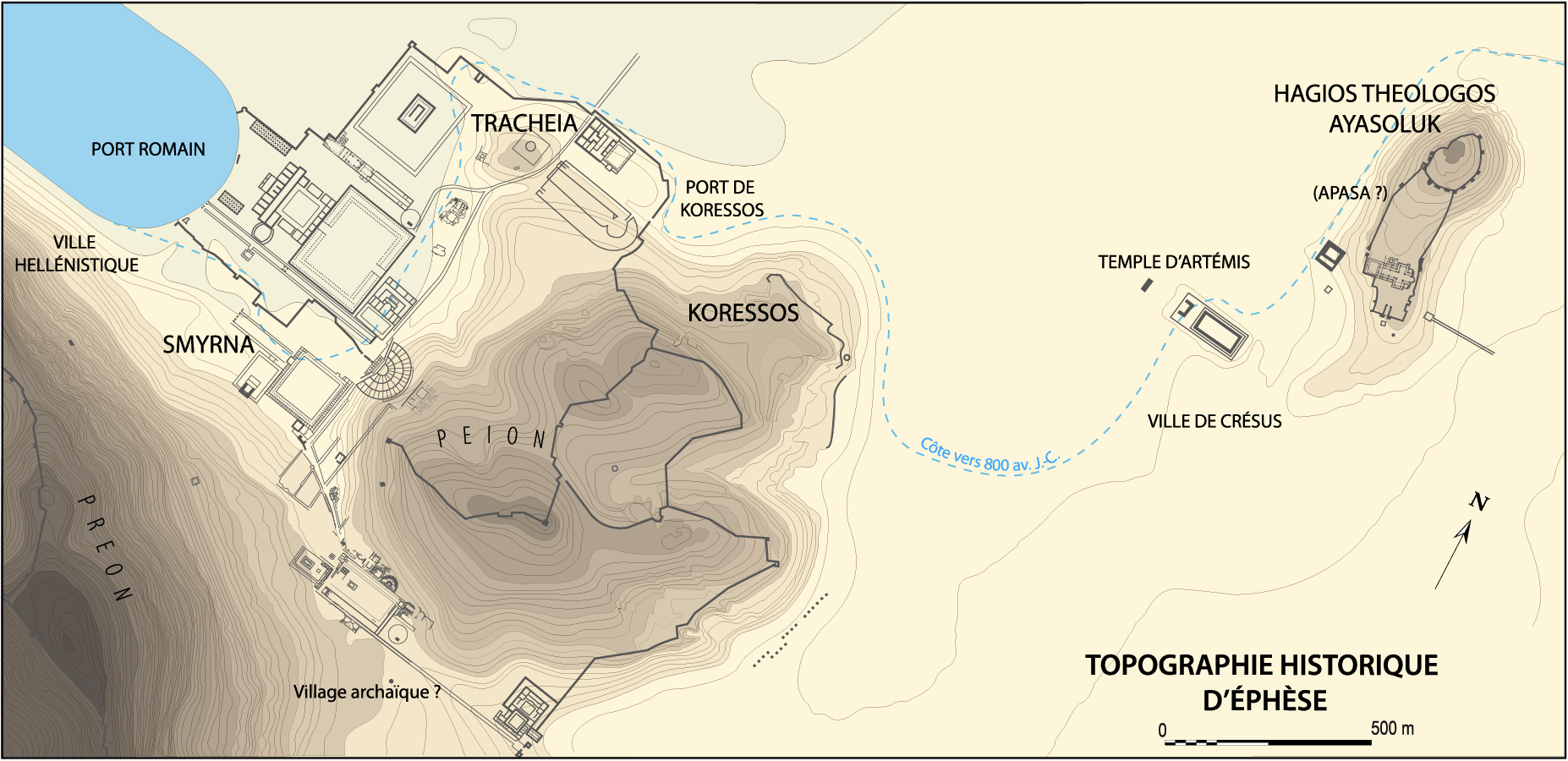
Historical topography of Ephesos

The history of archaeological research in Ephesus stretches back to 1863, when British architect John Turtle Wood, sponsored by the British Museum, began to search for the Artemision. In 1869 he discovered the pavement of the temple, but since further expected discoveries were not made the excavations stopped in 1874. In 1895 German archaeologist Otto Benndorf, financed by a 10,000 guilder donation made by Austrian Karl Mautner Ritter von Markhof, resumed excavations. In 1898 Benndorf founded the Austrian Archaeological Institute, which plays a leading role in Ephesus today.

Finds from the site are exhibited notably in the Ephesos Museum in Vienna, the Ephesus Archaeological Museum in Selçuk and in the British Museum.

In October 2016, Turkey halted the works of the archeologists, which had been ongoing for more than 100 years, due to tensions between Austria and Turkey. In May 2018, Turkey allowed Austrian archeologists to resume their excavations.

== Notable people ==
- Melas, the Elder and Younger (7th–6th century BC), name of two tyrants of Ephesus whose dynasty intermarried with the Mermnad dynasty. Melas the Elder was a brother in law of Gyges and Melas the Younger was the son in law of Alyattes
- Heraclitus (c. 535 – c. 475 BC) — presocratic philosopher
- Hipponax (6th century BC) — poet
- Zeuxis (5th century BC) — painter
- Parrhasius (5th century BC) — painter
- Herostratus (d 356 BC) — criminal
- Zenodotus (fl. 280 BC) — grammarian and literary critic, first librarian of the Library of Alexandria
- Agasias (2nd century BC) — Greek sculptor
- Menander (early 2nd century BC) — historian
- Artemidorus Ephesius (c. 100 BC) — geographer
- Tiberius Julius Celsus Polemaeanus (c. 45 – before c. 120) — founder of the Celsus library
- John the Apostle (1st century) — one of the twelve apostles of Jesus Christ
- Mary, mother of Jesus (1st century) — mother of Jesus Christ
- Publius Hordeonius Lollianus (1st century) — sophist
- Rufus (1st century) — physician
- Polycrates of Ephesus (130–196) — bishop
- Soranus of Ephesus (1st–2nd century) — physician
- Artemidorus (2nd century AD) — diviner and author
- Xenophon (2nd–3rd century) — novelist
- Maximus (4th century) — neoplatonic philosopher
- Sosipatra (4th century) — neoplatonic philosopher
- Manuel Philes (c. 1275–1345) — Byzantine poet

== See also ==
- Ancient settlements in Turkey
- Christianity in the 1st century
- Christianity in the 2nd century
- Christianity in the 3rd century
- Early centers of Christianity
- Early Christian art and architecture
- Early Christianity
- Nea Efesos

== Sources ==
- Athas, Daphne. 1991. Entering Ephesus. Sag Harbor, NY: Second Chance Press.
- Foss, Clive (1979). Ephesus After Antiquity. Cambridge University Press.
- Lambakis, Stylianos (17 October 2003). Θρακησίων Θέμα. Encyclopedia of the Hellenic World, Asia Minor (in Greek). Athens: Foundation of the Hellenic World.
- Leloux, Kevin. 2018. "The Campaign Of Croesus Against Ephesus: Historical & Archaeological Considerations", in Polemos 21–2, p. 47–63.
- Oster, Richard. 1987. A Bibliography of Ancient Ephesus. Philadelphia: American Theological Library Association.
- Pertusi, A. (1952). Constantino Porfirogenito: De Thematibus (in Italian). Rome: Biblioteca Apostolica Vaticana.
- Scherrer, Peter, Fritz Krinzinger, and Selahattin Erdemgil. 2000. Ephesus: The New Guide. Rev. ed. 2000. Turkey: Ege Yayinlari (Zero Prod. Ltd.).
