= Publius Hordeonius Lollianus =

Publius Hordeonius Lollianus (Ancient Greek: Πόπλιος Ὁρδεώνιος Λολλιανός) (2nd century AD) was a celebrated Greek sophist in the time of Hadrian and Antoninus Pius.

Referred to as just Lollianus, by Philostratus, and the Suda, an Athenian Greek inscription, dating from c. 142, gives his full name as Publius Hordeonius Lollianus. He was a native of Ephesus, and received his training in the school of Isaeus of Assyria. He was the first person nominated to the professor's chair of sophistik at Athens, where he was appointed General of the Hoplites, a civic office, which, under the emperors, made him food controller for the city. The liberal manner in which he discharged the duties of this office in the time of a famine is recorded with well-merited praise by Philostratus. Two statues were erected to him at Athens, one in the agora, and the other in the small grove which he is said to have planted himself.

The oratory of Lollianus was distinguished by the skill with which he brought forward his proofs, and by the richness of his style: he particularly excelled in extempore speaking; He gave his pupils systematic instruction in rhetoric, on which he wrote several works. These are all lost, but they are frequently referred to by the commentators on Hermogenes, who probably made great use of them.
