= Çukuriçi Höyük =

Prehistoric Tell settlement in Turkey

Coordinates: 37°55′45″N 27°21′34″E

Çukuriçi Höyük (Turkish: 'Mound in the Valley') is a prehistoric Tell settlement on the Aegean coast of western Turkey. It is located about 1 km southeast of the ancient city of Ephesus, near the present city of Selçuk in the province of İzmir. Between 2007 and 2016 the settlement was systematically investigated. The Tell was first settled in the 7th millennium BC (Neolithic; phases ÇuHö XIII–VIII), in the period of approx. 6700–6000 calBC. After a hiatus, the hill was reoccupied in the 2nd half of the 4th millennium BC. (Late Chalcolithic; phases ÇuHö VII–Vb). The end of settlement activity dates to the early Bronze Age (phases ÇuHö IV–III) at approx. 2800/2750 calBC.

Çukuriçi Höyük

== History of research ==
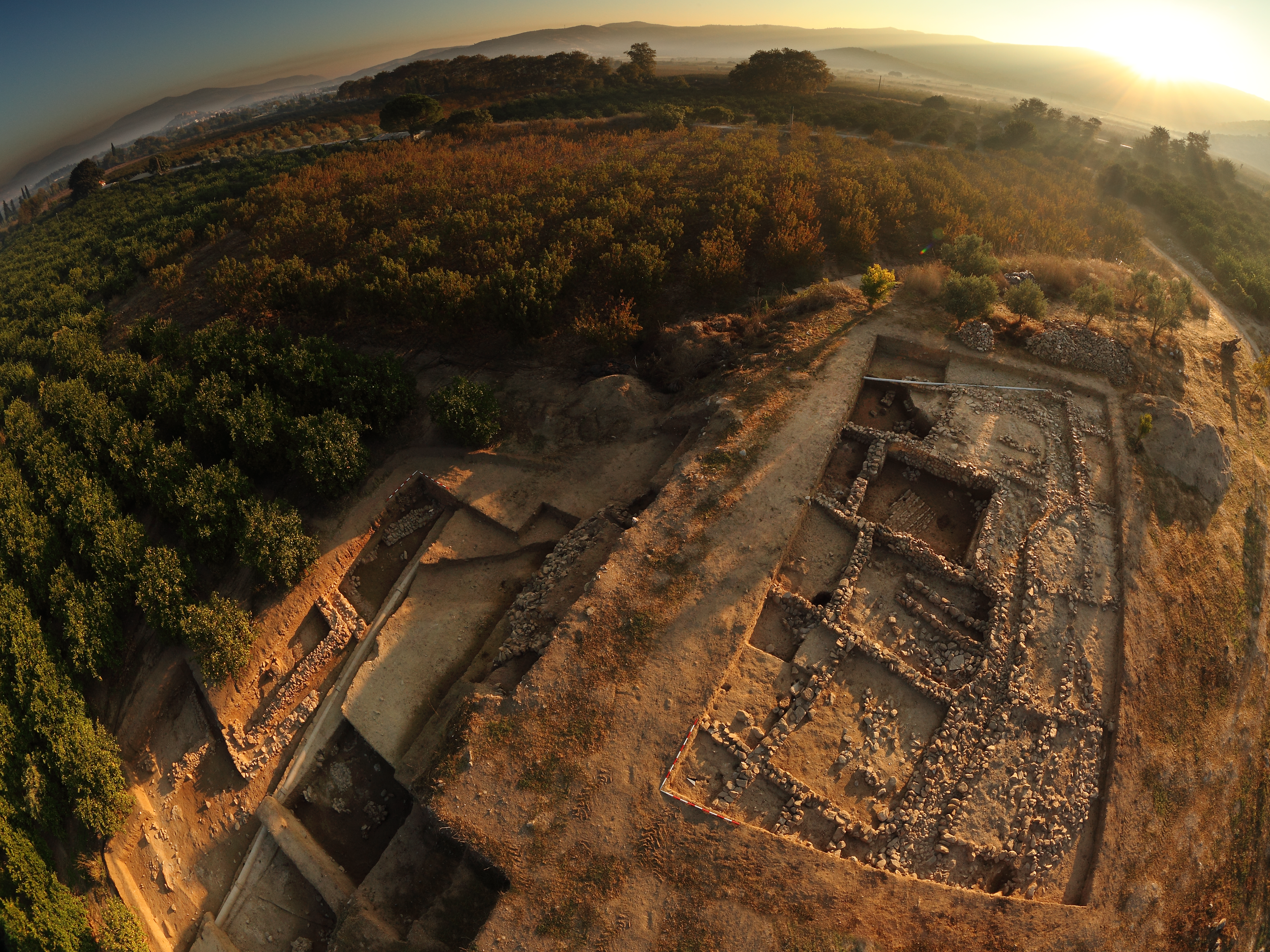
Overview of the excavations in the northern and middle trenches of Çukuriçi Höyük (Horejs 2017, 13, Fig. 1.2; Photo: N. Gail, ÖAI).

The Çukuriçi Höyük has always been visible as a small elevation in the plain east of Bülbüldağ and was mapped by A. Schindler as early as 1987, as a natural hill without recognizing the archaeological evidence. The first archaeological investigations took place in 1995 in the course of rescue excavations under the direction of the Selçuk Müzesi. In the following years the hill was increasingly destroyed in the course of intensive agricultural activities, until excavations took place again in 2006. These were planned in 2005 by the excavation director of Ephesos at the time, Friedrich Krinzinger. The first systematic research on the prehistoric archaeology in the region of Ephesos began in 2007, financed by the Austrian Science Fund (FWF Project P 19859-G02). These first campaigns were led by Barbara Horejs and funded until 2010. The resulting ground breaking results and the great scientific potential of the hill led to further projects, again funded by the FWF (FWF START Project Y 528-G02 and P 25825) and the European Research Council (ERC Prehistoric Anatolia 26339), also under the direction of Barbara Horejs. After completion of the project in 2016, the results will be prepared for publication in a separate "Çukuriçi Höyük" series as part of the Oriental and European Archaeology (OREA) publications.

== Settlement and surroundings ==
The reconstruction of the prehistoric landscape, the original coastline, the existing ecological resources and finally, the climatic conditions and their changes over the millennia, are central questions in the exploration of the tell in its micro-regional environment. Against this background, it becomes clear that the history of settlement can only be understood with the involvement of interdisciplinary research disciplines. The team is therefore made up of specialists in archaeology, archaeometallurgy, archaeozoology, archaeobotany, anthropology, climatology and physics as well as paleogeography and geology/mineralogy.

Geographical studies show that the Çukuriçi Höyük was originally located on a marine lagoon. Whilst it is unclear whether mobile hunters and gatherers used this lagoon as a habitat, it is assumed that the first settlers came over the sea. These people brought along a whole package of maritime know-how, which is suggested by the evidence of specialised fishing and the knowledge of navigation along certain sea routes. Even if the means of transport have not been preserved, the use of simple boats is probable. The valley basin, densely overgrown with oaks, was crossed by small streams and formed the perfect habitat for early farmers and cattle breeders.

== Excavations and results ==
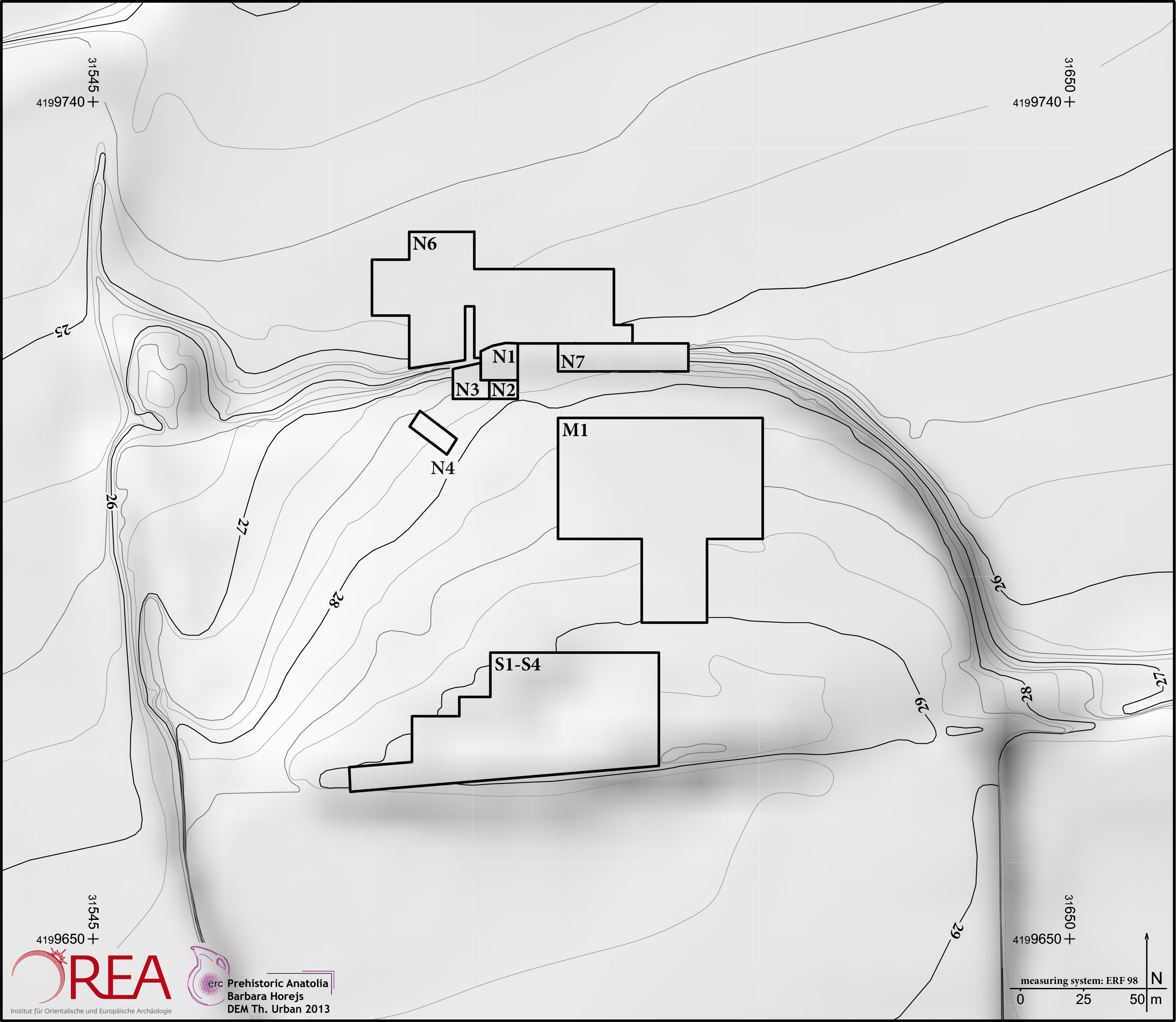
Plan of the areas excavated between 2006 and 2014 on Çukuriçi Höyük (Horejs 2017, 16, Fig. 1.4; map: M. Börner; DEM: Th. Urban).

The site was excavated in three areas. In the north (trenches N 1-6), in the middle area (trench M1) and in the southern trenches (S1-4), trenches S1-4 revealed the original centre of the Tell.

These excavations showed that the hill, clearly visible in the landscape, is a prehistoric Tell (Turk. Höyük). The hill was created due to thousands of years of settlement and rebuilding in the same place, resulting in the accumulation of massive occupation layers overlying each other, forming an artificial hill. This form of settlement is typical in the periods of the Neolithic, the Chalcolithic and the Bronze Age (8.–2. Millennium B.C.) from the Orient to Southeast Europe. However, in Western Anatolia only a few tells have been excavated and systematically explored to date. At Çukuriçi Höyük, a total of thirteen superimposed settlements from different periods have been identified. Each of these settlement phases (ÇuHö I–XIII) was relatively dated on the basis of material studies (mainly ceramics) but also using absolute chronology from over 100 radiocarbon dates.

=== Neolithic ===
The oldest settlement phase at Çukuriçi Höyük (phase ÇuHö XIII) derives from the Early Neolithic and dates to the early 7th millennium BC, based on short-lived radiocarbon data. The findings, which were excavated at the foot of today's hill, show remnants of everyday life, such as stone working. The early detection of pressure technology, for chopped stone tools, and specific types of tools, indicate new influences from outside. Together with other indicators, this technology reflects a link to the Northern Levant (PPNB), from which a maritime network can already be derived in this early phase of the Neolithic in Western Anatolia. Horejs argues that pioneers, embedded in this network, were looking for new land on the Aegean coast and were the first settlers in this region.

Some 150 years later, in the late Neolithic, the settlers of Çukuriçi Höyük built houses with solid stone bases, wooden posts and mud walls. Many activities can be reconstructed based on the findings, these include weapons, such as sling missiles made of stone and clay, which were stored within the settlement. A particularly extraordinary find is a cache of long and sharp obsidian blades, found inside of a building. They are not only unique in the Aegean, but also show the far-reaching relationships of the inhabitants. The raw material comes from the island of Melos in the Aegean Sea, some 300 km away. The technology of long blade production and the ritual practice of their deposition are particularly well known in the Middle East. In addition, analysis has also shown that local potters produced very high quality, thin-walled containers, which were probably mainly used for storing and consuming food. Very often fish were on the menu, as the remains of a tuna fillet on a floor prove.

Even in this early period, diet was varied, based mainly on domestic animals such as pigs, sheep, goats and cattle. This food was supplemented by wild hare, fox, red deer and aurochs as well as the collection of sea shells.

The maritime character of this society is indicated by deep-sea fish, recovered for the first time, which suggests a sea voyage across the borders of the Aegean. Beside contacts with the Aegean, proven by the use of Melian Obsidian, contact with East Anatolia, Mesopotamia and the Near East also existed. A specialization in craftsmanship of the people settling here can be seen, among other things, in the high-quality ceramic vessels and the chopped stone tools, which were predominantly made from imported obsidian. This early settlement was abandoned, however, the reasons for which are not clear.

=== Late Chalcolithic ===
After a hiatus of about 2600 years, the settlement hill was only reoccupied in the late Chalcolithic period, in the 2nd half of the 4th millennium BC. This "recolonisation" includes the phases ÇuHö VII–Vb, which were excavated in the trenches N7 and M1. In the oldest phase of this period the settlement was surrounded by a huge moat, most likely related to fortification. After a short time, however, it was infilled with stones, probably to provide an area for settlement expansion, suggested by the subsequent construction of new structures. Diverse architecture, textile production and metallurgical crafts are also found in the settlement. A special marble figure proves that the inhabitants of the 4th millennium BC were also active in large-scale networks. Residential and storehouses, as well as drying platforms, indicate intensive agriculture. The extensive contacts and specialized craftsmanship described, lay the foundations for the rise of proto-urban settlements that appear in the 3rd millennium BC.

=== Early Bronze Age ===
The Early Bronze Age is an era of great and lasting changes in the Aegean and South Eastern Europe. Probably triggered by the demand for metals and their trade, as well as the resulting wealth, the first proto-urban centres and large fortified settlements emerged around the middle of the 3rd millennium BC. The role of Western Anatolia in this important development phase of human societies is still unclear in many areas. From about 3000 BC, with the beginning of the Bronze Age, the hill of Çukuriçi Höyük is now densely covered with architecture. Multi-room buildings, open places and alleys testify to the intensive use of the area. About 50 furnaces and a multitude of metallurgical finds prove a metallurgical centre was established at the site. Of particular importance is the production of copper objects whose manufacture can be verified from casting in a prefabricated mould to forging. The analytical studies of metals, slags, semi-finished and finished products, and related tools, show a highly specialized community between 2950/2900 and 2750 calBC. The main focus of these craftspeople was the production of arsenic copper. This was extended to also include a few precious metals (gold, silver), silver-copper alloys and very rarely tin-bronze production. Ceramic finds, such as jugs and storage vessels, but also antler objects, and the metal finds, give an insight into the everyday life of specialized craftspeople. In addition to objects used for the communities own requirements, products for trade were also manufactured in the workshops. There is also evidence for ovens and stoves which were used for cooking. Further handicraft activities, such as the processing of bones or leather, also took place within the rooms, and we find that textile production was another important economic activity, suggested by the numerous spindle whorls and loom weights, found in the settlement. Analyses of textile production show a specialization also in this craft sector.

The settlement of the Early Bronze Age can be regarded as a place with multi-layered activities. It is primarily a metallurgical centre for the production of copper and bronze objects. In addition to these specialists, the residents included textile craftspeople, fishermen and small farmers. Due to the intensive character of specialized craft activities livestock farming was probably undertaken by other groups outside the centre. This specialization and division of labour suggest early proto-urban structures about 5000 years ago.

Another important role within the Bronze Age settlement, beside hunting and agriculture, was marine fishing. The preparation of mussels was also very popular at this time as demonstrated by the presence of pits filled with mussel shells. The eating habits of the inhabitants seem to have been quite different to those of earlier periods. During the EBA sheep and goat are dominant in the assemblage, followed by cattle. Beside fallow deer and wild boar, aurochs and possibly wisent were hunted. When it comes to marine sources, lagoon cockles are dominant. In fish, a high diversity including dolphins can be seen. No fresh water species, except eel, were fished throughout EBA. Probable off shore fishing is indicated by sharks and rays, although the major fishing was conducted close to the shore.

== Significance ==
The excavations at Çukuriçi Höyük revealed the oldest settlement of Ephesos, which began about 9000 years ago, but also one of probably the oldest settlement sites in Western Anatolia. Central questions on the spread of the Neolithic from Inner Anatolia to Southeast Europe are only one aspect of the Tell's research. The function of the hill in the 4th millennium BC and the cultural developments that took place in this period (which finally led to the new period of the Bronze Age) form an additional broad field of research with many unanswered questions. Finally, Çukuriçi Höyük with its well-preserved remains of Early Bronze Age settlements also offers potential for a better understanding of the lasting cultural changes in the early 3rd millennium BC. Its location at an intersection between the cultural regions of Anatolia and the Aegean also allows research into large-scale contacts and relationships, without which many developments in the prehistory of mankind would be inconceivable.
