= Micronations and the Search for Sovereignty =

2021 book by Harry Hobbs and George Williams

- Author: Harry Hobbs; George Williams
- Language: English
- Series: Cambridge Studies in Constitutional Law
- Subject: Micronationalism
- Publisher: Cambridge University Press
- Publication date: 23 December 2021 (ebook); January 2022 (hardcover)
- Publication place: United Kingdom
- Media type: Print (hardcover; paperback) ebook
- Pages: 256
- ISBN: 978-1-009-15012-5 (hardcover); ISBN 978-1-009-15014-9 (paperback); ISBN 978-1-009-15013-2 (ebook)

Micronations and the Search for Sovereignty is a 2021 book by Australian constitutional law specialists Harry Hobbs and George Williams about micronations and their legal status. Written from an academic perspective, it is one of few works on micronational movements and the earliest-published book to focus largely on the legal aspect of micronations. The book concerns the definition of statehood, the place of micronations within international law, people's motivations for declaring them, the micronational community and the ways by which such entities mimic sovereign states. In 2022 Hobbs and Williams published a book for a broader audience, How to Rule Your Own Country: The Weird and Wonderful World of Micronations.

== Context and publication ==
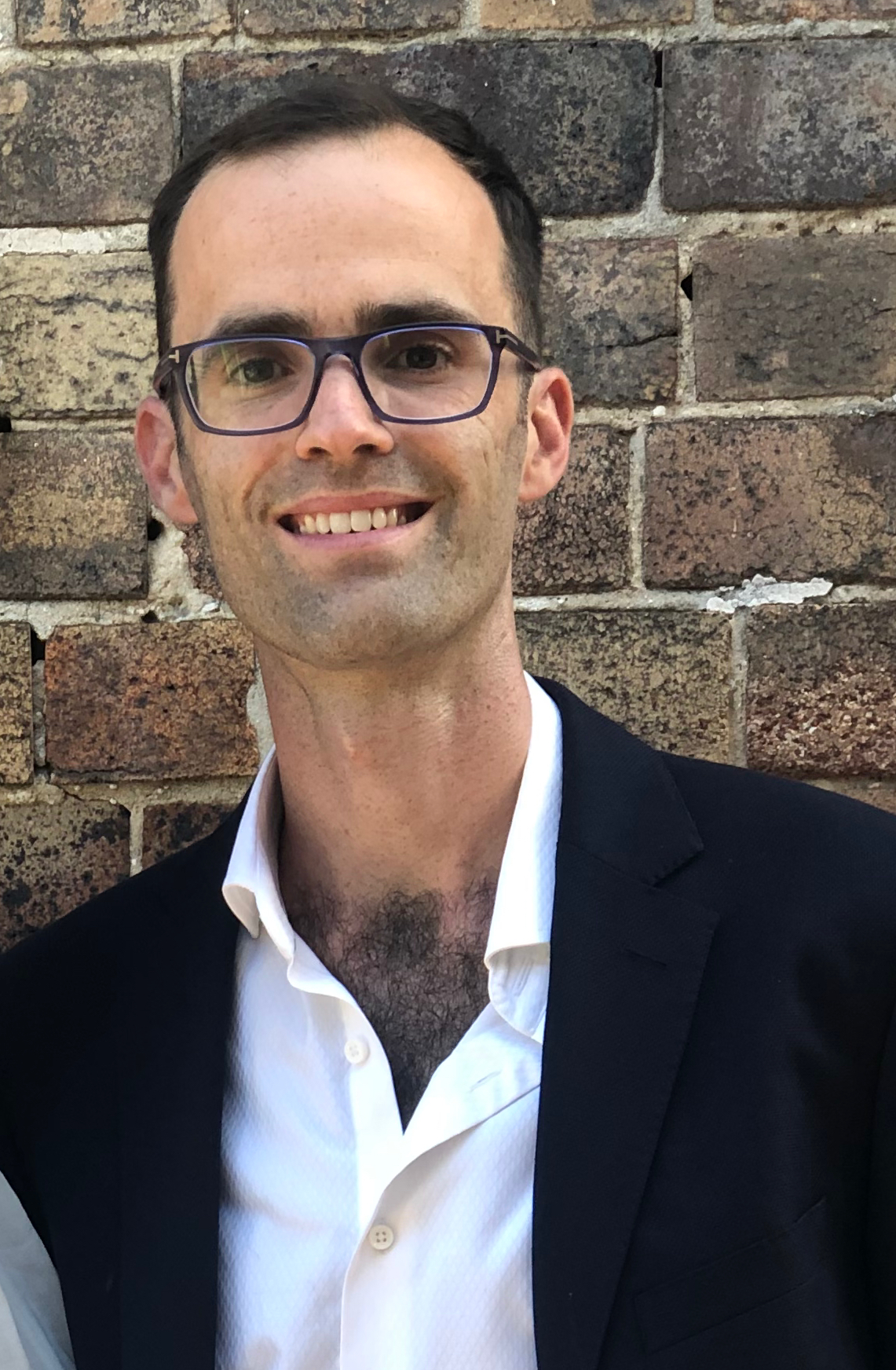
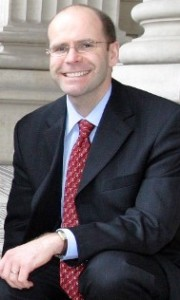
Hobbs (left) and Williams (right), authors of Micronations and the Search for Sovereignty

Micronations are political entities that claim independence and mimic acts of sovereignty as if they were a sovereign state, but lack any legal recognition. According to Collins English Dictionary, many exist "only on the internet or within the private property of [their] members" and seek to simulate a state rather than to achieve international recognition; their activities are generally non-threatening, often leading sovereign states to not actively contest the territorial claims they put forth. Legally speaking, micronation as a word has no basis in international law.

Micronations and the Search for Sovereignty is authored by the Australian lawyers and legal academics Harry Hobbs, an associate professor at the Faculty of Law of the University of Technology Sydney, and George Williams, a professor and Deputy Vice-Chancellor of Planning and Assurance at the University of New South Wales. Both Hobbs and Williams specialise in international law; Hobbs is a human rights lawyer and Williams is an Australian constitutional law professor. Hobbs and Williams have published several articles together in academic journals regarding micronations since 22 April 2021. Prior to the book's publication, Hobbs had written about Indigenous sovereignty and Indigenous people's aspirations in Australia in 2020. Micronations and the Search for Sovereignty is written from an academic perspective, and is one of a few works on micronations and the earliest-published book to focus largely on their status in regards to the law.

The earliest-published book about micronationalism was How to Start Your Own Country (1979) by libertarian science-fiction author Erwin S. Strauss, in which Strauss documents various approaches to sovereignty and their chances of success. This was followed by two French-language publications—L'Etat c'est moi: histoire des monarchies privées, principautés de fantaisie et autres républiques pirates in 1997 by writer and historian Bruno Fuligni and Ils ne siègent pas à l'ONU in 2000 by founder and head of the French Institute of Micropatrology, Fabrice O'Driscoll, which details over 600 micronations. In 2006, travel guide book publisher Lonely Planet published Micronations: The Lonely Planet Guide to Home-Made Nations, a humorous gazetteer that profiles various micronations and information on their locations, flags, stamps and other facts.

Although academic interest in micronationalism is limited, the study of the phenomenon—known as micropatriology—has been gaining momentum since the 2010s, and two journals entitled Shima and Transformations have frequently published articles regarding micronationalism. Micronations and the Search for Sovereignty was published by Cambridge University Press as an ebook on 23 December 2021, and in hardcover and paperback formats in January 2022. Published as part of Cambridge University Press's Cambridge Studies in Constitutional Law series edited by David Dyzenhaus and Thomas Poole, Micronations and the Search for Sovereignty is 256 pages long. (Note: Hobbs & Williams 2021, "copyright page")

== Content ==
The book has six chapters, a preface, an appendix of micronations discussed, and a full index. (Note: Hobbs & Williams 2021, "front matter") The first chapter, "Prince Leonard Prepares for War", profiles several micronationalists and their reasonings for declaring independence. The chapter's title refers to Leonard Casley, Prince of the Principality of Hutt River micronation, who declared, then undeclared, war on Australia as he believed a state undefeated in war must be recognised. Chapter two, "Statehood and Micronations", concerns the definition of statehood within international law, legal recognition, Indigenous nations and attempted definitions of sovereignty such as the Montevideo Convention, with Hobbs and Williams concluding that the meaning of sovereignty is subjective. They note that micronation has no formal or legal definition, and define the term as follows: micronations are political entities that claim independence and mimic acts of sovereignty as if they were a sovereign state, but lack any legal recognition. They draw a distinction from states with limited recognition, quasi-states and autonomous Indigenous nations as, according to them, micronations lack the legal basis within international law for their existence.

The third chapter, "Motivations" (Note: Hobbs & Williams 2021, pp. 82–125)—expanding on chapter one—explores the motivations and influences of micronationalists for operating their own micronations. Chapter four, "Performing Sovereignty", (Note: Hobbs & Williams 2021, pp. 126–161) explores how micronations simulate states by creating their own coinage, passports and postage stamps. It also explores diplomacy between micronations and the intermicronational community as a whole. Chapter five, "State Responses", (Note: Hobbs & Williams 2021, pp. 162–200) concerns the reactions to micronations by countries and world governments. Hobbs and Williams write that most micronations are ignored as they pose little threat to their country's sovereignty, whereas micronationalists who individually commit crimes, such as tax evasion, are dealt with in court as citizens rather than receiving any recognition as being part of a secessionist movement. In the sixth and final chapter, "The Future of Micronationalism", (Note: Hobbs & Williams 2021, pp. 201–220) the authors explore the continued operation of micronations as well as the continuation of the intermicronational community.

== Reception and aftermath ==
Micronations and the Search for Sovereignty has received positive reviews for its legal and non-dismissive academic approach to micronations. Both Vicente Bicudo de Castro, writing for the journal Shima, and law PhD candidate Mark Fletcher of Alternative Law Journal appreciated Hobbs and Williams' serious analysis of micronations in regards to secessionist movements. De Castro noted that their legal perspective on micronations was something he had not previously seen in other works about micronations, citing The Lonely Planet Guide to Home-Made Nations and Let's Split! A Complete Guide to Separatist Movements and Aspirant Nations, from Abkhazia to Zanzibar (2015). Both Fletcher and de Castro lauded Hobbs and Williams' definition of micronation as helpful, although Jack Corbett, professor of politics at the University of Southampton and reviewing the book for Small States & Territories, disliked that the work offered only a surface analysis on the definition of sovereignty while mostly implying the subjectivity of statehood.

The authors' detailed descriptions of various micronations, rather than solely focusing on their claims to legitimacy, received praise. Corbett wrote that this brought upon a welcomed "light-heartedness". Conversely, Fletcher thought that Hobbs and Williams could have better explored the legal means by which micronations attempt to assert their legitimacy by considering these attempts from the micronationalist's point of view. Nevertheless, he noted that an underlying question regarding micronational claims is how to distinguish valid legal claims from "law-flavoured nonsense", and that it is a question that Hobbs and Williams investigate "extremely well". De Castro considered the authors' analysis on the legitimacy of micronational claims as superior to Strauss' analysis of them in How to Start Your Own Country.

The book's usefulness to scholars—particularly those interested in micronationalism—was widely noted; Corbett contended that Micronations and the Search for Sovereignty was without a doubt the "definitive text" on micronationalism. De Castro wrote that it should be embraced as a foundation for further research into the topic. Fletcher stated that Hobbs and Williams did an admirable job analysing a large amount of grey literature to gather enough material for an "academic discussion" on micronations.

On 15 August 2022, Hobbs gave an online seminar hosted by the Australian National University's College of Law in which he discussed and summarised Micronations and the Search for Sovereignty. A follow-up to Micronations and the Search for Sovereignty by Hobbs and Williams for general audiences, entitled How to Rule Your Own Country: The Weird and Wonderful World of Micronations, was published in November 2022 by the University of New South Wales Press.

== See also ==
- Bibliography of works on micronationalism
- International Micropatrological Society
- List of micronations
- Sovereign citizen movement
