= Bibliography of works on micronationalism =

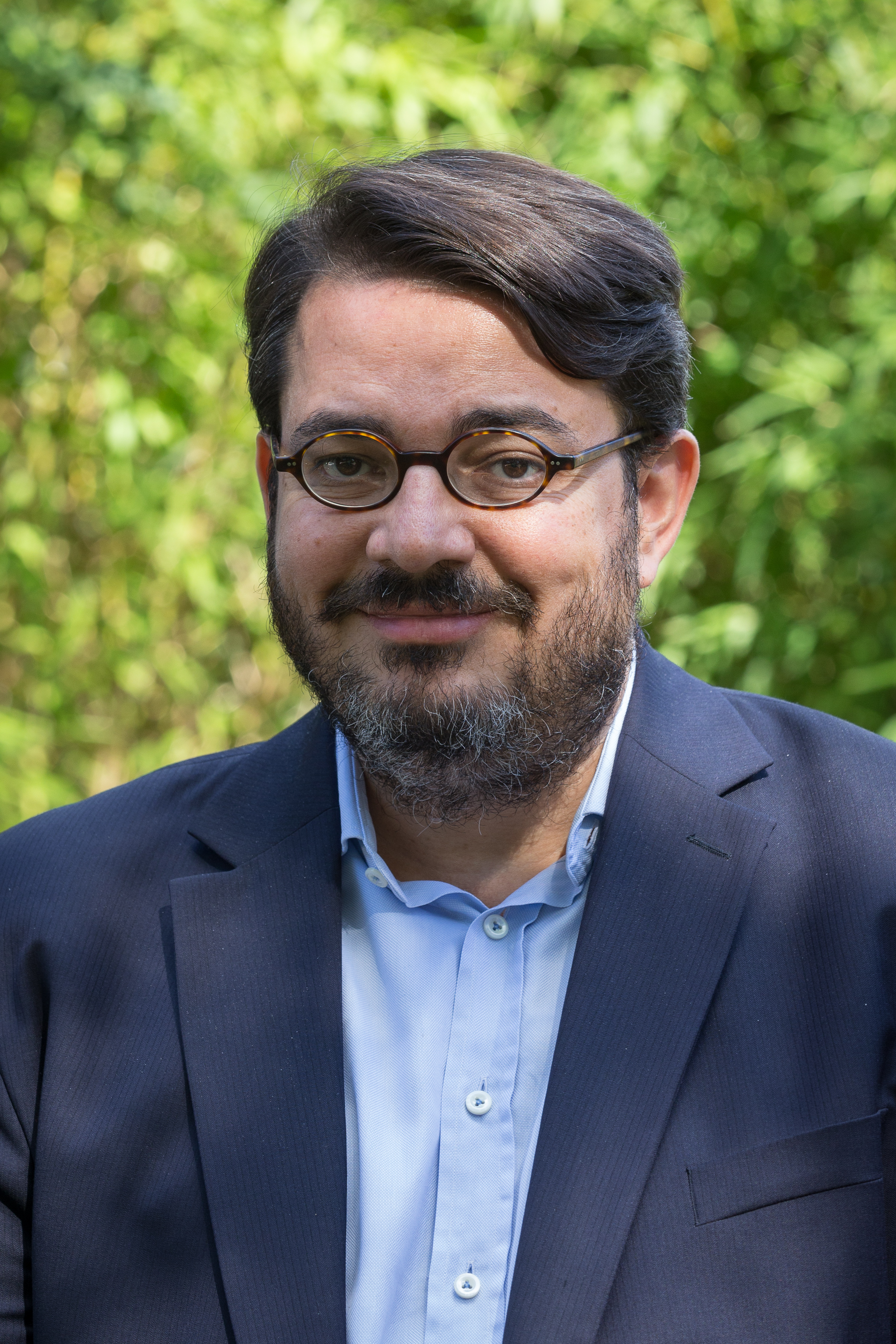
French writer Bruno Fuligni has authored three books on micronationalism.

Although the academic study of micronations—known as micropatriology—is limited, there have nevertheless been a number of published works on the subject. The following is a list documenting these written works. This list does not contain works wherein micronationalism is the secondary theme, such as reference works which contain or make references to micronations and books about individual micronations.

The earliest-published book about micronationalism was How to Start Your Own Country (1979) by libertarian science-fiction author Erwin S. Strauss, in which Strauss documents various approaches to sovereignty and their chances of success. The work became regarded as the seminal work on micronationalism. Two French-language books followed; L'Etat c'est moi: histoire des monarchies privées, principautés de fantaisie et autres républiques pirates in 1997 by French writer and historian Bruno Fuligni, and Ils ne siègent pas à l'ONU in 2000 by Swiss academic Fabrice O'Driscoll, who also founded the French Institute of Micropatrology. In 2006, travel guide book publisher Lonely Planet published Micronations: The Lonely Planet Guide to Home-Made Nations, a humorous gazetteer that profiles various micronations and information on their locations, flags, stamps and other facts.

Fuligni authored a second book on micronationalism alongside Isabelle Hanne, a photo book entitled Micronations, in 2013. In 2016, he authored an atlas and reference work about micronational kingdoms entitled Royaumes d’aventure: Ils ont fondé leur propre État. In 2022, (Note: Micronations and the Search for Sovereignty was first published as an ebook on 23 December 2021.) Australian legal academics Harry Hobbs and George Williams authored two books about micronationalism; the academic Micronations and the Search for Sovereignty, focusing on the legal aspects of micronations, and the general-purpose How to Rule Your Own Country: The Weird and Wonderful World of Micronations, detailing numerous micronations categorised by chapter.

== Journal articles and book chapters ==
In addition to monographs, scholarship on micronationalism has appeared in academic journals and edited collections across several fields, including law, geography, accounting, digital society, and performance studies. Significant contributions include Vicente Bicudo de Castro's work on accounting, sovereignty, and the Principality of Hutt River; Sandra Petermann's geographical research on micronations; and Robert Motum’s performance studies scholarship on micronationalism, sovereignty, identity, and digital nationhood. Other interdisciplinary work includes writing by Philip Hayward, Harry Hobbs, and others on micronational cultures, law, and digital sovereignty.

== In English ==
Title	Year	Author(s)	Publisher	Pages	ISBN	Refs.
How to Start Your Own Country	1979	Erwin S. Strauss	Loompanics (second edition); Paladin Press (third edition)	167	978-1-581-60524-2	
Illustrated and written from a libertarian perspective, How to Start Your Own Country introduces five approaches that micronations may take in an attempt to achieve statehood. The final chapter profiles several micronations, elements of micronationalism and other related organisations in alphabetical order.
Micronations: The Lonely Planet Guide to Home-Made Nations	2006	John Ryan; George Dunford; Simon Sellars	Lonely Planet	160	978-1-741-04730-1	
An illustrated, humorous guidebook and gazetteer split into three parts. The book consists of profiles of various micronations and offers information on their flags, leaders, currencies, dates of foundation, maps and other facts. Sidebars throughout the book provide overviews of such topics as coinage and stamps, as well as a profile of Emperor Norton.
Micronations and the Search for Sovereignty	2022	Harry Hobbs; George Williams	Cambridge University Press	256	978-1-009-15012-5	
Written from an academic perspective by two lawyers, this work principally concerns micronations in regards to international law, although it also explores the definition of statehood, the micronational community and the ways by which micronations mimic sovereign states.
How to Rule Your Own Country: The Weird and Wonderful World of Micronations	2022	Harry Hobbs; George Williams	University of New South Wales Press	320	978-1-742-23773-2	
Illustrated and for general audiences, this book documents various micronations categorised by chapter. An overarching theme is the disproportionate number of micronations located within Australia, which the authors attribute to larrikin tradition and the country's remoteness.

== In French ==
Title	Year	Author(s)	Publisher	Pages	ISBN	Ref(s).
L'Etat c'est moi: Histoire des monarchies privées, principautés de fantaisie et autres républiques pirates	1997	Bruno Fuligni	Éditions de Paris	238	978-2-905-29169-1	
A general work about micronationalism that also details several micronations. In the book, Fuligni coins cryptarchie (English: cryptarchy) as a synonym for micronation.
Ils ne siègent pas à l'ONU: Revue de quelques micro-etats, micro-nations et autres entités éphémères	2000	Fabrice O'Driscoll	Presses du Midi	287	978-2-878-67251-0	
Written by the founder of the French Institute of Micropatrology (French: l'Institut français de micropatrologie), this book details over 600 micronations and intermicronational organisations.
Micronations	2013	Bruno Fuligni; Isabelle Hanne	Diaphane	157	978-2-919-07719-9	
A photo book illustrated by Léo Delafontaine concerning various micronations and PoliNation 2012, including an overview of their history and sidebars with information such as their size, population and national website.
Royaumes d'aventure: Ils ont fondé leur propre État	2016	Bruno Fuligni	Les Arènes	320	978-2-352-04285-3	
An atlas and reference work detailing several micronational kingdoms and their rulers, divided into three classifications.

== Theses ==
Title	Year	Author	Degree	University	Pages	Ref(s).
What is a Nation: The Micronationalist Challenge to Traditional Concepts of the Nation-state	2009	Bennie Lee Ferguson	Master of Arts	Wichita State University	184	
Micronations: Konstituierte Staaten in konstruierten Welten. Zur historischen Entwicklung von Mikronationen und ihren gegenwärtigen Ausprägungen	2010	Irina Ulrike Andel	Master of Philosophy	University of Vienna	129	
Subversive Sovereignty: Parodic Representations of Micropatrias Enclaved by the United Kingdom	2014	Terri Ann Moreau	Doctor of Philosophy	University of London	312	
Scripted Borders: Performing Nation and Community in Micronationhood	2025	Robert Motum	Doctor of Philosophy	University of Toronto	190	
