= How to Rule Your Own Country =

2022 book by Harry Hobbs and George Williams

How to Rule Your Own Country: The Weird and Wonderful World of Micronations
- Author: Harry Hobbs; George Williams
- Language: English
- Subject: Micronationalism
- Publisher: University of New South Wales Press
- Publication date: November 2022
- Publication place: Australia
- Media type: Paperback; E-book
- Pages: 320
- ISBN: 978-1-742-23773-2 (paperback); 978-1-742-23850-0 (e-book)

How to Rule Your Own Country: The Weird and Wonderful World of Micronations is a 2022 book by Australian lawyers and legal academics Harry Hobbs and George Williams about micronationalism—exploring several micronations and their motivations for declaring independence. The book gives an overview on the topic of micronationalism and explores numerous micronations, extant and defunct, as well as their motivations for declaring sovereignty. An overarching theme is the disproportionate number of micronations located within Australia. How to Rule Your Own Country is a follow-up to Hobbs' and Williams' more academic 2021 work Micronations and the Search for Sovereignty.

== Context and publication ==
How to Rule Your Own Country: The Weird and Wonderful World of Micronations was authored by Australian legal academics Harry Hobbs and George Williams as a follow-up to their 2021 work Micronations and the Search for Sovereignty, which was published by Cambridge University Press. Hobbs and Williams have also published several articles together in academic journals regarding micronations since 22 April 2021. They are both experts in international law; Hobbs is a human rights lawyer and Williams an Australian constitutional law professor.

How to Rule Your Own Country was published by the University of New South Wales Press (also known by the imprint NewSouth) in paperback in November 2022. It was also published as an ebook that same year. Josephine Pajor-Markus was responsible for the internal design of the book and Peter Long designed the cover. How to Rule Your Own Country is 320 pages in length and has nine chapters as well as an afterword, acknowledgments and a full index. (Note: Hobbs & Williams 2022, "front matter") It includes illustrations and maps. The book gives an overview on the topic of micronationalism and explores numerous micronations, extant and defunct, as well as their motivations for declaring sovereignty.

== Content ==
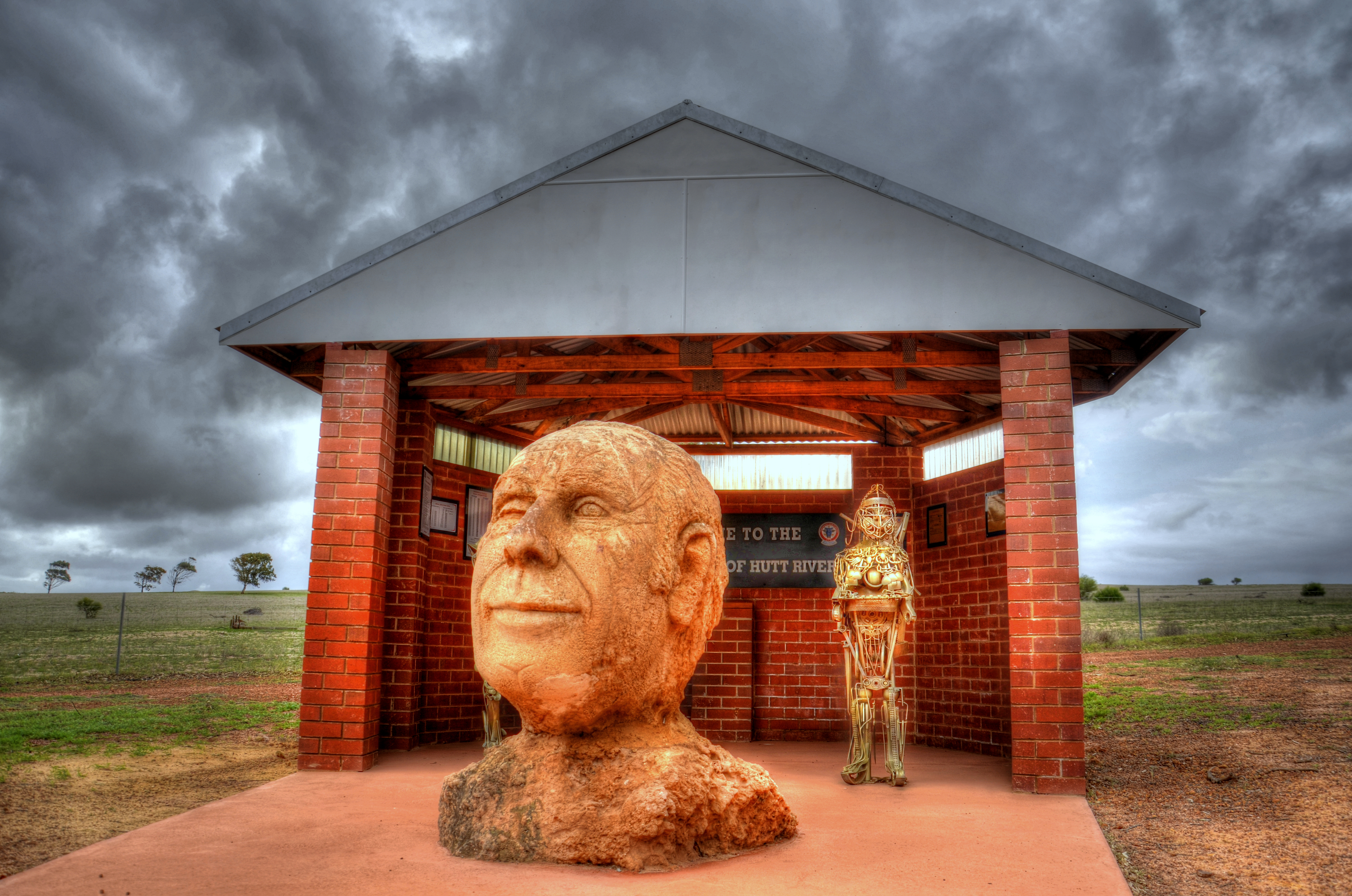
Bust of Prince Leonard in the Principality of Hutt River, one of the micronations profiled in How to Rule Your Own Country

How to Rule Your Own Country particularly deals with an overarching theme on the disproportionate number of micronations located within Australia, which the authors explore in the first chapter and attribute to "larrikin tradition" and the country's remoteness. Hobbs and Williams also write that while many countries may persecute micronations, Australia in comparison actively tolerates them.

The second chapter is dedicated to the Principality of Hutt River—following its foundation by Leonard Casley in 1970, disputes with the Australian Taxation Office, and its dissolution in 2021. It explores the principality's welcoming reaction from the Australian public. (Note: Hobbs & Williams 2022, "'While I Breathe, I Hope': The Principality of Hutt River") The next chapter concerns the Principality of Sealand, following pirate radio broadcaster Paddy Roy Bates as he proclaims the micronation on the decommissioned Roughs Tower and its subsequent history including an attempted takeover. (Note: Hobbs & Williams 2022, "'From the Sea, Freedom': The Principality of Sealand") Chapter four is about the now-defunct Republic of Minerva, which built an artificial island in the Minerva Reefs in 1972 by importing sand. They also explore its libertarian principles. (Note: Hobbs & Williams 2022, "Libertarian paradise: The Republic of Minerva")

The fifth chapter explores various seasteading micronations that endeavored to build permanent dwellings at sea in international waters, focusing on Operation Atlantis (1968–73), the Republic of Rose Island (1968–69) and the Principality of New Utopia (since 1999). (Note: Hobbs & Williams 2022, "Liberty on the high seas: Reef republics and seasteads") Next, the authors write about micronations which were established as protests. They first discuss the Gay and Lesbian Kingdom of the Coral Sea Islands, declared in 2004 against Australia's non-recognition of same-sex marriages, and disestablished in 2017 following the results to legalise it in the Australian Marriage Law Postal Survey. The Conch Republic was declared in 1982 as a satirical protest against a disruptive roadblock and checkpoint set up by the United States Border Patrol. Hobbs and Williams conclude with Frestonia, which was declared by squatters on a London property after the local council planned to evict them. The squatters succeeded and Frestonia remains active as a local community. (Note: Hobbs & Williams 2022, "Fighting for change: Political protest and law reform")

Next, Hobbs and Williams discuss micronations related to environmental causes. Greenpeace established two such micronations—the Global State of Waveland in 1997 in protest against oil exploration; and the Glacier Republic in 2014, claiming a glacier off the coast of Chile in protest against mining activities near it. The authors then discuss the Independent State of Aramoana in New Zealand proclaimed during the Save Aramoana Campaign to prevent the construction of an aluminium smelter that would have destroyed the titular village. After receiving massive media attention, the plan for its construction was relocated. The Free Republic of Wendland in West Germany was a protest camp established in 1980 against the creation of a nuclear waste dump. Over 1,000 permanent occupiers organised a community with makeshift buildings before being evicted. Hobbs and Williams conclude with the Grand Duchy of Westarctica, which claims Marie Byrd Land. Proclaimed by Travis McHenry, McHenry uses the micronation to raise awareness on climate change's effects on Antarctica's wildlife. (Note: Hobbs & Williams 2022, "Environmental micronations: Creating a country to save the planet")

The Principality of Outer Baldonia, established in 1949, claimed sovereignty over a portion of Outer Bald Tusket Island in Nova Scotia, Canada. When the Soviet publication Literaturnaya Gazeta published a critique of the charter of Outer Baldonia in 1953, founder Russell Arundel threatened to withdraw Outer Baldonia's recognition from the Soviet Union unless the article was retracted. When the magazine did not respond, Arundel declared war on the USSR and declared victory as he received no response. Outer Baldonia effectively dissolved in 1973 after Arundel sold the island to the Nova Scotia Bird Society for $1. The Republic of Molossia in the United States, a satirical benevolent dictatorship run by Kevin Baugh, was created for comedic value. The eighth chapter concludes with the Great Bitter Lake Association, created as a micronation by the crews of 15 ships who were stranded in the Suez Canal during the Six-Day War. (Note: Hobbs & Williams 2022, "Humour and boredom: Playing a king")

In the final chapter, the authors first discuss confidence trickster Gregor MacGregor, who attempted from 1821 and 1837 to attract investors and settlers to a fictional territory he called Poyais. The Sovereign State of Aeterna Lucina was founded in Australia in 1978 by Paul Neuman, who falsely claimed to have received a noble title from a non-existent foreign monarch. He sold at least one fake knighthood and faced fraud charges in the 1990s; but the case was abandoned after a hung jury. Next, the authors discuss Noah Musingku, creator of the pyramid scheme U-Vistract to provide finances for an independent Bougainville Island. Around 2004, he declared himself king of his own Kingdom of Papaala, and upon secessionist leader Francis Ona's death in 2005, Musingku also declared himself king of Ona's Me'ekamui. Hobbs and Williams conclude on the Dominion of Melchizedek founded in 1990. Gerhard Bacher, one of its founders, tried to use cheques issued by fictitious Melchizedek banks to open legitimate bank accounts in Hong Kong, but failed and was sentenced to 6 months in prison. In 1998, the dominion recognised the unrecognised Republic of Kosova. Desperate for any political support, president Ibrahim Rugova quickly announced that it had been recognised by Melchizedek unaware that it was a fictional country. (Note: Hobbs & Williams 2022, "Frauds and scams: The great micronation rip-offs")

== Reception ==
Celina Ribeiro, writing for The Guardian, was positive, saying that Hobbs and Williams "unpack the phenomenon [of micronations] with both gravity and lightness." Ribeiro liked that the book focused not only on the legality of micronations but also gave space for "the farce of it all", making for an "accessible and entertaining read". Richard Kreitner of The Weekend Australian disliked how—noting Hobbs and Williams' previous academic work on micronations—How to Rule Your Own Country preferred "to let the implicit comedy of micronationalism speak for itself" as opposed to studying micronations from a more academic legal perspective, adding that they "could have been a little more generous with their academic expertise". He further added that while he enjoyed the book overall, he wondered if Hobbs and Williams had "underestimated the readers' appetite for something more substantial", and said that the indigenous Murrawarri Republic should not be considered on the same level as the Principality of Hutt River.

Frank Bongiorno of Australian Book Review was more negative, writing "I thought I was about to undertake an improving academic tour … [i]t turned out, however, that How to Rule Your Own Country is really a bit of a hoot". Bongiorno criticised the work's explanation for the number of micronations in Australia, which Bongiorno attributed instead to colonialism and the Australian government's disregard towards Aboriginal sovereignty. Simon Caterson, writing for The Sydney Morning Herald's weekly newsletter The Booklist, gave a positive review. He called the book entertaining and added that it "reveals that the ambition to rule your own country is expressed nowhere more often than in Australia." Caterson appreciated the section of the book devoted to the small number of micronations which are exclusively female, which he said was "one of the more intriguing sections".

== See also ==
- Bibliography of works on micronationalism
