= Gollancz =

Gollancz may refer to:

- Gollancz (surname), a Polish-Jewish surname
- Victor Gollancz Ltd, a former British publishing house, now used as an imprint by the Orion Publishing Group

== See also ==
- Gołańcz, a town in Poland
