= Henry Hobbs =

Henry Hobbs may refer to:

- Henry Hobbs (American football) (1887–1931), American football player and coach
- Henry Hobbs (cyclist) (born 2007), British cyclist

== See also ==
- Harry Hobbs (fl. 2020s), Australian lawyer and legal academic
