= Ernst Marcus =

Ernst Marcus may refer to:

- Ernst Marcus (zoologist) (1893–1968), German zoologist
- Ernst Marcus (philosopher) (1856–1928), German lawyer and philosopher
