= Cassava Balls =

Live album by Hartmut Geerken, Famoudou Don Moye, and John Tchicai
- Released: 1985
- Recorded: May 8, 1985
- Venue: Praxis '85 Festival, Orpheus Theater, Athens, Greece
- Genre: Free jazz
- Length: 1:04:48
- Label: Praxis; CM 111
- Producer: Kostas Yiannoulopoulos

CD reissue cover

Cassava Balls is a live album by percussionists Hartmut Geerken and Famoudou Don Moye and saxophonist John Tchicai. It was recorded in May 1985 at the Praxis '85 Festival at the Orpheus Theater in Athens, Greece, and was released on LP by the Praxis label later that year. In 1999, Leo Records reissued the recording on CD with three extra tracks as part of their Golden Years of New Jazz series.

The recording was made shortly after a tour of Sierra Leone, Guinea, and Liberia, during which the musicians recorded The African Tapes.

== Reception ==
Professional ratings
Review scores
Source	Rating
AllMusic	4.5/5 stars
The Encyclopedia of Popular Music	3/5 stars

In a review for AllMusic, Steve Loewy called the album "an explosive and totally engaging recording," and wrote: "this recording is alternatively (and simultaneously) raw, humorous, ethnic, and virtuosic. Geerken performs on nearly 30 'instruments' in addition to the piano... Tchicai lives up to his potential as a free player, with some absolutely riveting blowing, while Moye fulfills his reputation as a maven of percussion."

Robert Spencer of All About Jazz described the album as "a high-energy, high-passion, all-around great recording," captured on "a night when, by the sound of things, each man was in thorough musical command."

Writing for Metropolis, Richard Cochrane commented: "If this rattles a few cages, it's probably because it refers at the same time to the New Thing and what were, in 1985 at least, some new things... this disk is... recommended to those willing to give it a chance, who will find a great deal to enjoy in this rather unique session."

== Track listings ==
1. "Patriotic Poem Number One Forty Years After" (Geerken) – 7:25
2. "Sawasawa" (Moye / Geerken) – 6:45
3. "Races Places Faces and Asses" (Moye) – 8:07
4. "Mohawk" (Charlie Parker) – 4:35 (bonus track on CD reissue)
5. "Mothers" (Albert Ayler) – 4:51 (bonus track on CD reissue)
6. "Marconison" (Geerken) – 11:14 (bonus track on CD reissue)
7. "Cassava Snake One Pot" (Moye / Geerken / Tchicai) – 6:45
8. "Mikel Black" (Tchicai) – 6:15
9. "Rosty Metal" (Tchicai) – 8:37

== Personnel ==
- Famoudou Don Moye – drums, bongos, congas, talking drum, conch, bells, voice
- Hartmut Geerken – piano, prepared piano, gongs, angklung, whistle, bells, drums, swarmandal, claves, wood block, temple block, maracas, rattle, agogô, castanets, shortwave radios, Tibetan horn, misc instruments, voice
- John Tchicai – tenor saxophone, percussion, handclaps, vocals
