= Harry Hobbs =

Australian legal academic

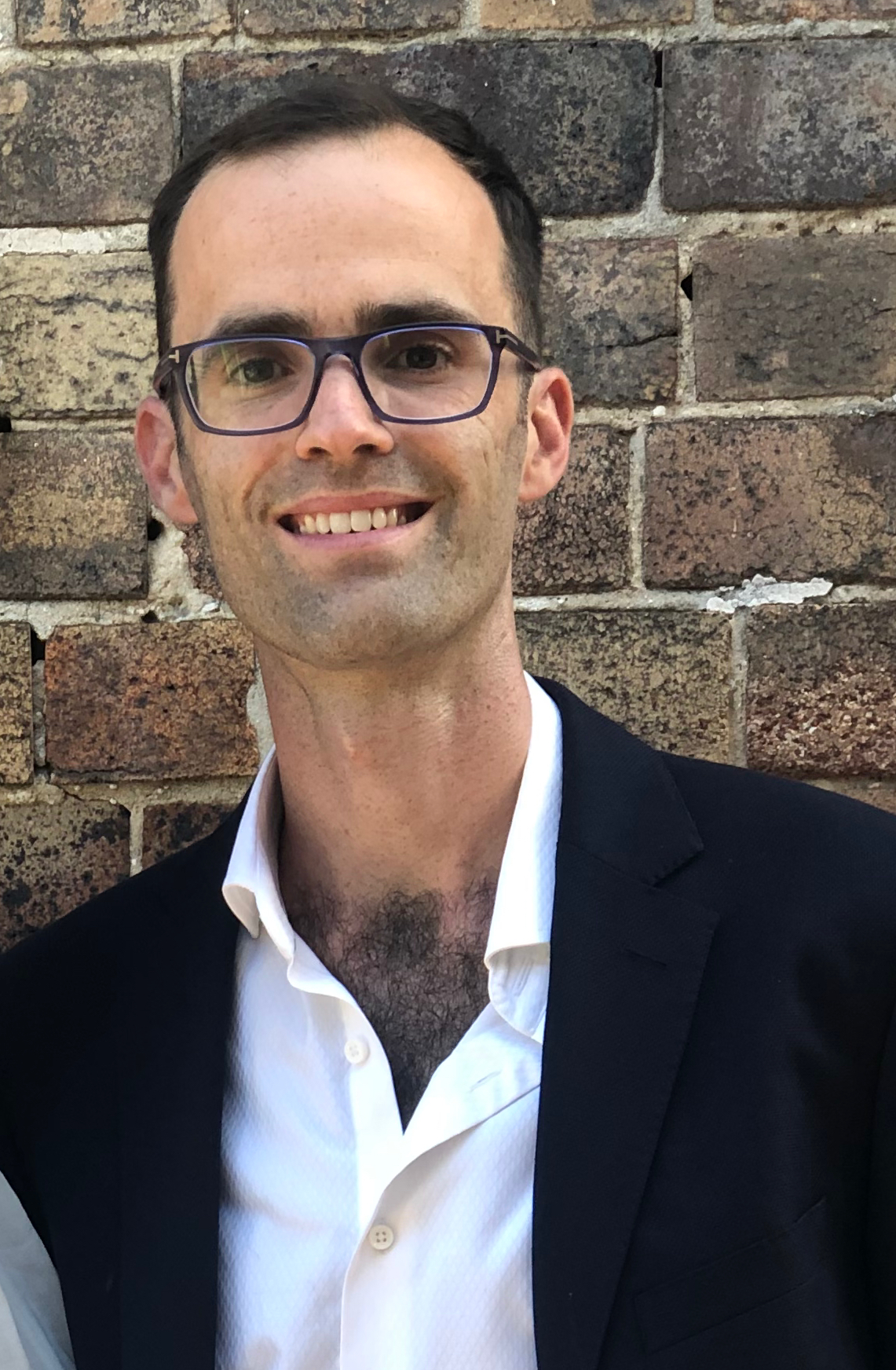
- Occupations: Lawyer; Legal academic Micropatriologist

Academic background
- Education: Australian National University (BA); New York University (LLM); University of New South Wales (PhD)

Academic work
- Discipline: Australian constitutional law
- Institutions: Senior lecturer at the Faculty of Law of the University of Technology Sydney

Harry Hobbs is an Australian lawyer and legal academic who specialises in Australian constitutional law. An associate professor at the Faculty of Law of the UNSW Sydney, Hobbs has published numerous works regarding the legal rights of Aboriginal Australians within Australia, micronations, and secessionism in Australia. He has collaborated with lawyer George Williams on several occasions.

== Bibliography ==
- Hobbs, Harry; Williams, George (2020). Treaty (2 ed.). The Federation Press. ISBN 978-1-76002-2-396.
- Hobbs, Harry (2020). Indigenous Aspirations and Structural Reform in Australia. Bloomsbury Publishing. ISBN 978-1-50994-0-158.
- Hobbs, Harry; Williams, George (2021). Micronations and the Search for Sovereignty. Cambridge Studies in Constitutional Law. Cambridge University Press. doi:10.1017/9781009150132.001. ISBN 978-1-00915-0-125. S2CID 245459675.
- Hobbs, Harry; Williams, George (2022). How to Rule Your Own Country: The Weird and Wonderful World of Micronations. University of New South Wales Press. ISBN 978-1-74223-7-732.
