= The African Tapes =

Live album by Famoudou Don Moye, John Tchicai, and Hartmut Geerken
- Released: 1987 and 1988
- Recorded: April 1985
- Venue: Sierra Leone, Guinea, and Liberia
- Genre: Free jazz
- Label: Praxis; CM 114; CM 115
- Producer: Kostas Yiannoulopoulos

Volume Two cover

The African Tapes, Volumes 1 and 2, is a pair of live albums by percussionist Famoudou Don Moye, saxophonist John Tchicai, and percussionist Hartmut Geerken. The albums were recorded in April 1985 at various locations in West Africa, and were released on LP by the Praxis label in 1987 (Volume 1) and 1988 (Volume 2). In 2001, Leo Records reissued the recordings as a double-CD set as part of their Golden Years of New Jazz series.

The recordings were made during a tour of Sierra Leone, Guinea, and Liberia, with the musicians acting as cultural ambassadors, and feature extensive audience participation. Prior to the trip, the members of the trio had never played together. After leaving Africa, the group traveled to Europe, where they recorded the live album Cassava Balls the following month.

== Reception ==
Professional ratings
Review scores
Source	Rating
AllMusic	4/5 stars
The Penguin Guide to Jazz	2.5/4 stars

In a review for AllMusic, Steve Loewy wrote: "The exquisite percussion of Famoudou Don Moye... and Hartmut Geerken colors every tune with a Dionysian joy. John Tchicai blows hard and convincingly, as he belts out simple riffs and improvises melodically and passionately... there is a unique enlightening quality to the bells and whistles that engulfs the saxophone in a meditative cloud of vaporous cacophony."

The authors of The Penguin Guide to Jazz Recordings stated that the album "is not the easiest of listens comprising as it does a rather personal diary of encounters with local people, some trained musicians, most not. Tchicai plays mightily as he always does, but some of the extended percussion passages are hard to absorb without some visual stimulation."

A reviewer for All About Jazz commented: "The African Tapes offers surprisingly high sonic fidelity. And the cultural, linguistic, and musical richness of these two discs stands unparalleled in the history of improvised music. It is hard to recommend The African Tapes strongly enough."

Derek Taylor, writing for One Final Note, remarked: "the trio's sounds left an indelible mark on the ears they touched. This... diary of their mission of musical good will is not only a fascinating listen—it's an opportune impetus for examining the reciprocal relationships between African and jazz music ecologies."

== Track listings ==
=== Volume 1 ===
1. "Mobimbirutile" (Moye/Geerken/Tchicai) – 7:03
2. "Angklung Okro" (Geerken/Tchicai) – 6:20
3. "Akarakuru" (Moye) – 7:39
4. "Post-Ramadan Exhausters" (Tchicai) – 10:17
5. "Yabom Kamara" (Geerken) – 8:44
6. "Mohawk" (Charlie Parker) – 1:39

=== Volume 2 ===
1. "Bo Oh Bo" (Traditional) – 7:11
2. "The Rainbow's Over" (Tchicai) – 6:40
3. "Conakry Overtones" (Geerken) – 2:41
4. "Go Down Moses" (Traditional) – 3:35
5. "Reveiller Le Bellevillie" (Geerken) – 8:53
6. "Pink Pepper" (Tchicai/Pierre Favre) – 4:38
7. "Panjebo-Ta (Invocation of the Smoked Chimpanzees)" (Moye) – 4:26
8. "Please Come to the Stage" (Moye/Traditional) – 2:38

== Personnel ==
- Famoudou Don Moye – drums, congas, bells, vocals
- John Tchicai – tenor saxophone, percussion, vocals
- Hartmut Geerken – bells, gong, cowbell, vocals, horn, whistle, waterphone
