= Fuligni =

Fuligni is a surname. Notable people with the surname include:

- Bruno Fuligni (born 1968), French writer and historian
- Federico Fuligni (born 1995), Italian motorcycle racer
