= Wakefield Press =

Wakefield Press may refer to:

- Wakefield Press (Australia), an independent book publishing company in Australia with a specialization in true stories, gastronomy, history, literature and gift books.
- Wakefield Press (US), an independent publishing house in the United States with a specialization in historical avant-garde literature in translation.
