= Ernst Marcus (philosopher) =

German lawyer and philosopher

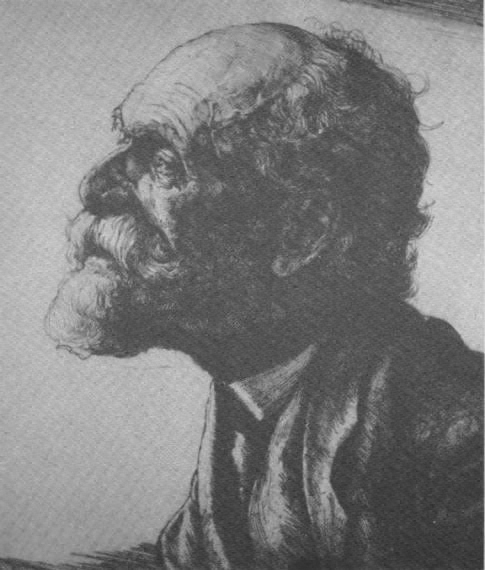
Ernst Marcus by Hermann Kätelhön

Ernst Moses Marcus (3 September 1856, Kamen – 30 October 1928, Essen) was a German lawyer and philosopher. He developed a theory of aether based on Immanuel Kant's posthumous work Opus Postumum, however sharply disagreeing with Erich Adickes' interpretation. He used this to mount a criticism of Albert Einstein's theory of relativity. He was a major influence on Salomo Friedlaender.

Ernst was the son of Robert Ruben Marcus and Berta Marcus. He studied law in Bonn and Berlin. Whilst working as an Assessor in 1889 he developed an interest in philosophy. In 1890 he was appointed as a judge in Essen. In 1893 he married Berta Auerbach, with whom he had three children.

In 1899 he started regular meetings with Salomo Friedlaender, who admired his theses and became a firm supporter of him. Friedlaender referred to him by the epithet "the Krupp of logic".

== Works ==
- Kants Revolutionsprinzip (1902)
- Das Erkenntnisproblem (1905)
- Die Beweisfuehrung in der Kritik der reinen Vernunft (1914)
- Kants Weltgebaeude (1917)
- Das Problem der Excentrischen Empfindung und seine Losung (1918) Berlin: Verlag der Sturm
- Theorie einer natuerlichen Magie: Gegründet auf Kants Weltlehre (1924) Munich: Ernst Reinhardt.
- Kritik des Aufbaus der speziellen Relativitaetstheorie (1926)
- Die Zeit und Raumlehre Kants (1927)

His papers are held by the Leo Baeck Institute, New York.
