= Opus Postumum =

Posthumous literary work by Immanuel Kant

- Author: Immanuel Kant
- Original title: Opus postumum
- Translator: Eckart Förster & Michael E. Rosen
- Language: German
- Subject: Metaphysics
- Published: 1938
- Publication place: Germany

The Opus postumum was the last work by the German philosopher Immanuel Kant, who died in 1804. Although efforts to publish the manuscript were made in 1882, it was not until 1936–1938 that a German edition of the whole manuscript appeared. An English translation appeared in 1993 for the Cambridge Edition of the Works of Immanuel Kant.

== History of the manuscript ==
The manuscripts of the Opus postumum had not been bound, and following Kant's death, curious people visiting his house had disregarded their order. Johann Friedick Schultz, a close friend and trusted expositor of Kant was presented with the manuscripts by Kant's executor, Ehregott Andreas Wasianski. Schultz declared the manuscript to be unfinished and unworthy of publication, and then passed them onto Carl Christoph Schoen, who had married Kant's niece. Schoen attempted to edit the text, but abandoned the project. The manuscript remained lost amongst his papers for fifty years only to be discovered by his daughter after his death.
