= Most Serene Federal Republic of Montmartre =

Micronation in New York City

Coordinates: 40°46′01″N 73°57′32″W

- Micronation (unrecognized entity)
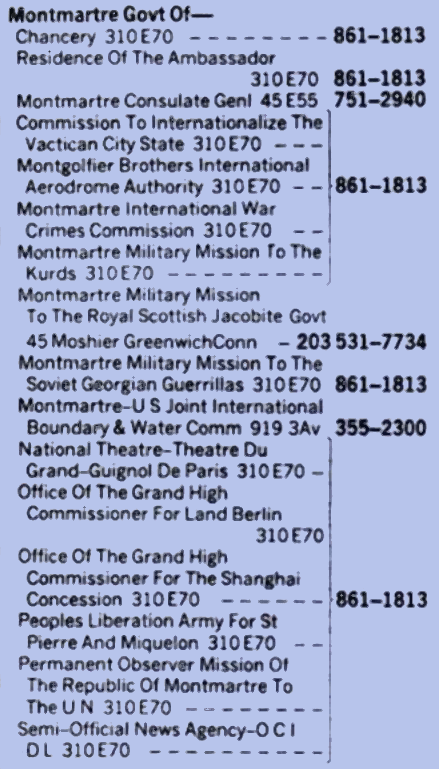
- 1977 listing in New York Telephone phone book's government pages, p. 949
- Location: Part of Manhattan, New York
- Claimed by: Barry Alan Richmond
- Dates claimed: c. 1965–present

The Most Serene Federal Republic of Montmartre (or the Serene Republic of Montmartre and Her Dependencies, or in brief the Republic of Montmartre) is either a micronation or an extended political satire. It is mostly within the boundaries of Manhattan, New York.

Barry Alan Richmond (born c. 1933), a stage actor/director, theatrical designer, author of articles on the Grand Guignol, proclaimed the Most Serene Federal Republic of Montmartre's existence and borders c. 1965 (mostly within Manhattan's Theatre District, "roughly 39th to 59th Street with a strip up the Hudson River to where the boat basin is, and from the middle of Fifth Avenue over to what international laws call the thalweg, which is the navigable channel in the middle of the Hudson River")... but set its origin at 1636. To some extent this may have been a piece of performance art in itself; but it exchanged mutual recognition with other such small organizations (micronations and governments-in-exile), and was acknowledged by the International Micropatrological Society. Richmond is named as its 47th president, among other titles.

== Phone book listing ==
On June 24, 1977, a New York Public Service Commission hearing was held in the World Trade Center's South Tower to resolve a dispute between Richmond and New York Telephone (NYTel), concerning the "Montmartre Govt Of" listing in the blue-pages (government) section of the phone book, as depicted to the right. NYTel wanted to remove that listing; Richmond wanted it kept. On June 29, Richmond sought an injunction in federal court to stop the removal; he didn't get one. On June 30, the PSC's hearing examiner ruled in favor of NYTel, but on July 7 the PSC said that statement was "vacated". This dispute was reported before the hearings in Mother Jones magazine, and the month after the hearings in The Los Angeles Times (on the front page) and New York Magazine.

On August 23, 1977, NYTel began distributing 955,000 new phone books, without the listing for Montmartre. An early April 1978 AP news item reported that Richmond had just lost a court case (on April 5) seeking the inclusion of that listing. In early December 1979, Richmond announced that the PSC had ruled in his favor and Montmartre's listing would be restored to the NYTel phone book; news quoted an NYTel spokesman complaining that this was "simply not fair".

== Grand Guignol ==
In a January 2001 article for the Financial Times, Mark Wallace reported that Richmond was focusing on a revival of the Grand Guignol (a grotesque theatre style from the original Montmartre in Paris), to which he then held the rights. The project was to be funded by selling Richmond's extensive collection of theatre and movie memorabilia, including original film programs, e.g. from Star Wars and Gone with the Wind.

Richmond's trademark for "Grand-Guignol" was last renewed in May 2002, but expired in January 2016.

== See also ==
- Most Serene Republic — for the special meaning of "Most Serene" (="sovereign")
- Mel Gordon
- Republic of Montmartre
