= Gollancz (surname) =

Gollancz is a family name originating from the Polish town Gołańcz (Gollantsch or Schwertburg near Wągrowiec, Wielkopolska). It is mainly known as the name of a prominent British Jewish family, including:

- Sir Hermann Gollancz (1852–1930), rabbi
- Sir Israel Gollancz (1864–1930), scholar of literature
- Sir Victor Gollancz (1893–1967), publisher and nephew of Hermann and Israel
