= Gołańcz =

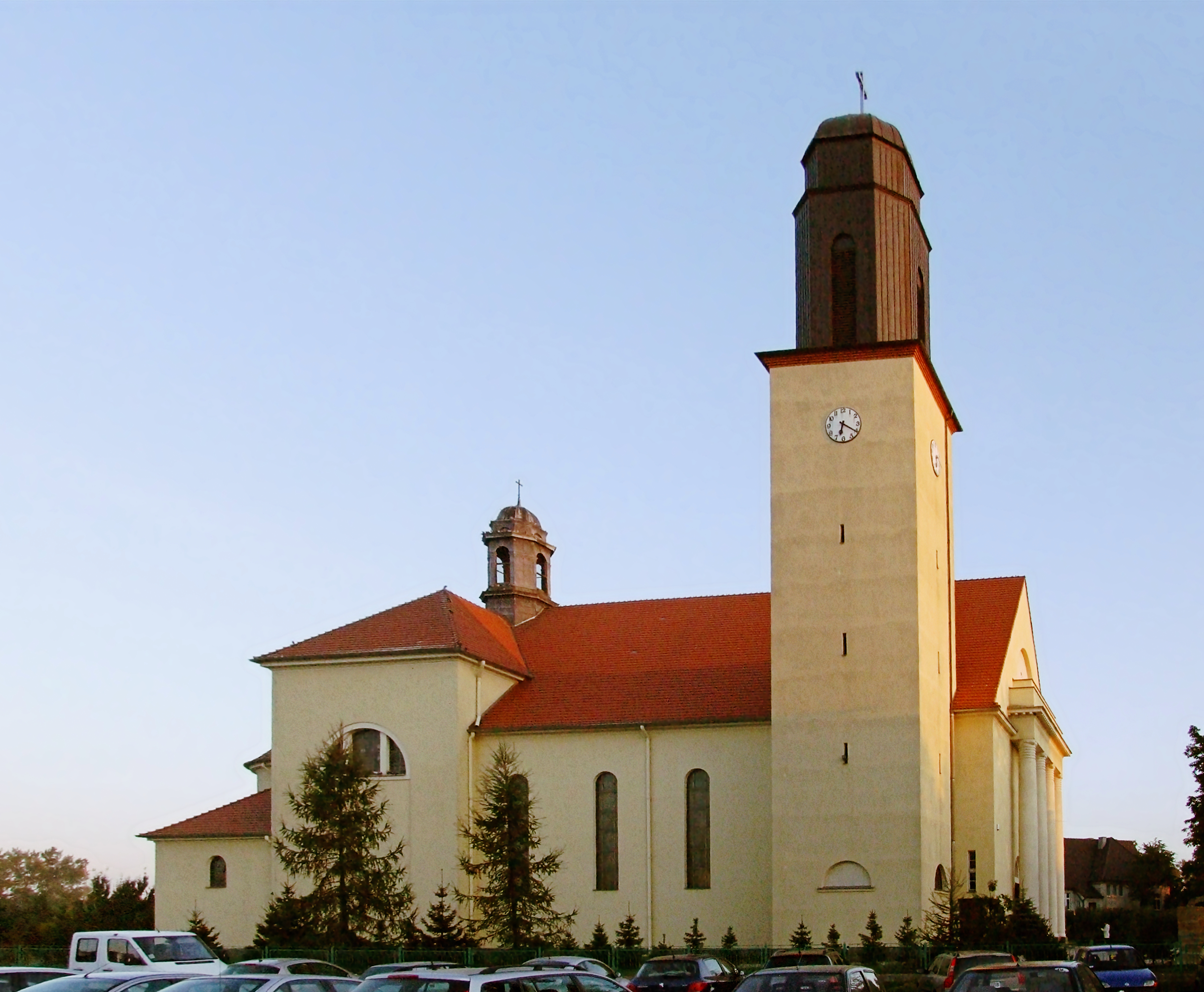
- Saint Lawrence church

- Flag Coat of arms

- Location within Poland
- Coordinates: 52°56′54″N 17°18′5″E
- Country: Poland
- Voivodeship: Greater Poland
- County: Wągrowiec
- Gmina: Gołańcz
- First mentioned: 1222
- Town rights: 14th century

Area
  - Total: 12.63 km^{2} (4.88 sq mi)

Population (2010)
  - Total: 3,333
  - Density: 263.9/km^{2} (683.5/sq mi)
- Time zone: UTC+1 (CET)
  - Summer (DST): UTC+2 (CEST)
- Postal code: 62-130
- Vehicle registration: PWA
- Website: http://www.golancz.pl/

Gołańcz ([ˈɡɔwaɲt͡ʂ]; German: Gollantsch, earlier German: Gollanz) is a town in Wągrowiec County, Greater Poland Voivodeship, Poland, with 3,333 inhabitants (2010).

== History ==
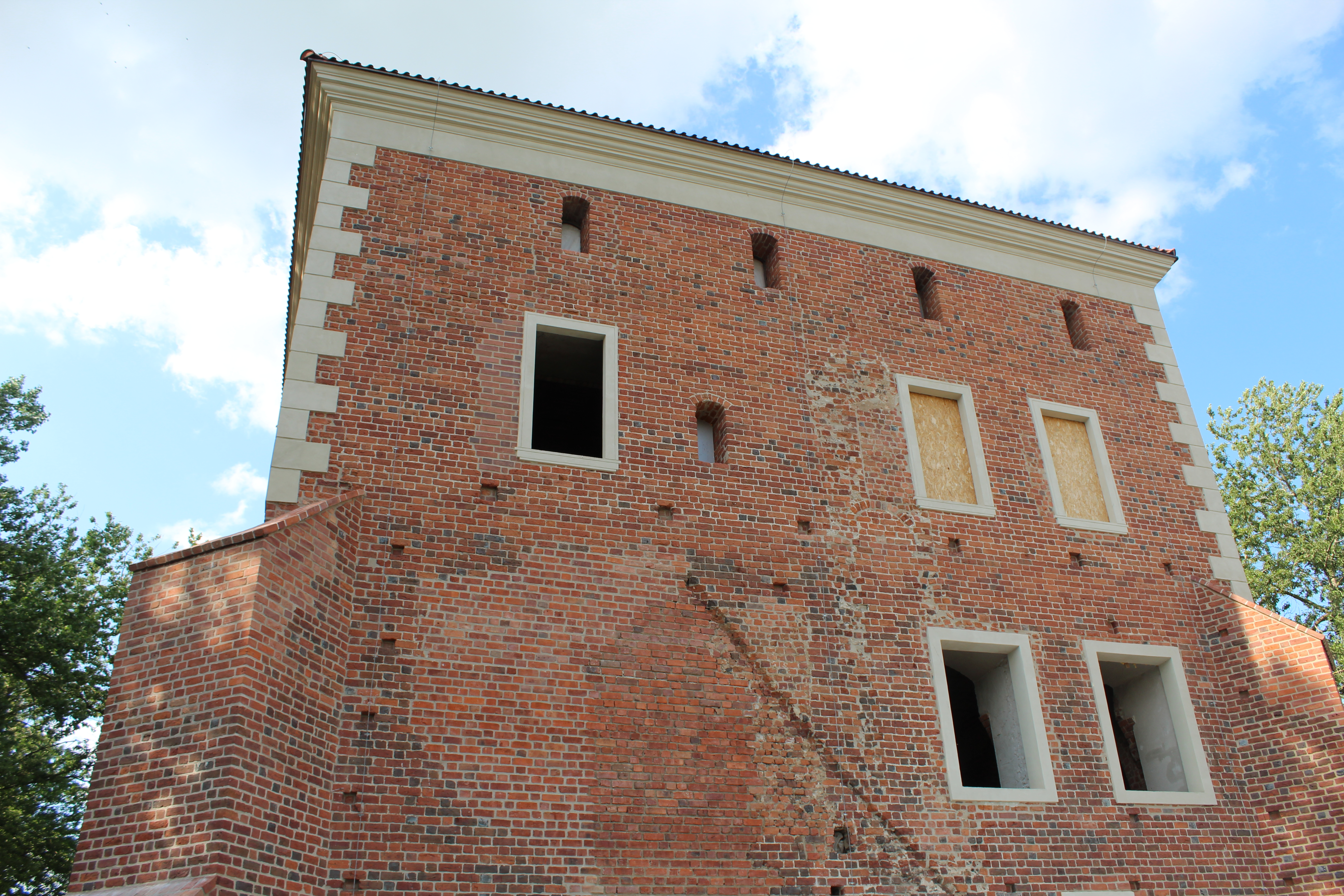
Castle

Gołańcz was first mentioned in a document from 1222. It was granted town rights in the 14th century. It was a private town of Polish nobility, administratively located in the Kcynia County in the Kalisz Voivodeship in the Greater Poland Province. The Gołańczewski noble family hailed from the town, including Maciej Gołańczewski, bishop of Kujawy from 1324 to 1364. In 1656 the town was fiercely defended by the Poles during the Swedish invasion of Poland (Deluge), but was eventually captured by the Swedes who then massacred the surviving defenders.

During the First Partition of Poland in 1772, the town became part of the Kingdom of Prussia. After the successful Greater Poland uprising of 1806, it was regained by Poles and included with the Duchy of Warsaw, but again became part of Prussia following the Congress of Vienna in 1815, and from 1871 was part of Germany. Its name was slightly Germanized to Gollantsch and Gollanz at that time. After the First World War, Poland regained independence and the town became part of the Second Polish Republic in 1919 following the Greater Poland Uprising.

It was again annexed by Germany as a result of the joint German-Soviet invasion of Poland, which started World War II in September 1939. Inhabitants of Gołańcz were among 107 Poles murdered by the Germans on December 8, 1939 in nearby Bukowiec during the Intelligenzaktion. In 1944, the Germans burned the bodies of the victims in attempt to cover up the crime. Also in December 1939, the Germans carried out expulsions of Poles, mostly owners of better houses, shops and workshops, which were then handed over to German colonists as part of the Lebensraum policy. In 1941 the Germans renamed the town Schwertburg to erase traces of Polish origin. The Polish resistance was active in Gołańcz. Piotr Kowalik, commander of the local unit of the Union of Armed Struggle, was arrested by the Gestapo in 1944, and then imprisoned in Żabikowo and the Gross-Rosen and Mittelbau-Dora concentration camps, yet he survived and returned to Gołańcz after the war. Gołańcz was restored to Polish rule in 1945, albeit under Soviet occupation during the existence of the Polish People's Republic.

In 2016, an official funeral of the town's defenders from 1656 took place, after their remains were discovered during archaeological works.

The prominent British Jewish family of Gollancz originated in this town. Through Victor Gollancz, the town has indirectly given its name to several streets in Germany, including the Gollanczstraße in Berlin.

== Transport ==
Gołańcz lies on the junction of vovoideship roads 242 and 193.

The nearest railway station is in Wągrowiec.

== Demographics ==
Historical population

Year	Pop.	±%
1843	1,135	—
1871	1,281	+12.9%
1880	1,181	−7.8%
1890	1,132	−4.1%
1900	1,093	−3.4%
1910	1,269	+16.1%

Year	Pop.	±%
1921	1,380	+8.7%
1931	1,471	+6.6%
1939	1,560	+6.1%
1950	1,639	+5.1%
1960	2,031	+23.9%
2010	3,333	+64.1%

== Sports ==
The local football team is Zamek Gołańcz. It competes in the lower leagues.

== Notable residents ==
- Salomo Friedlaender (1871–1946), German philosopher
