= Salomo Friedlaender =

German writer (1871–1946)

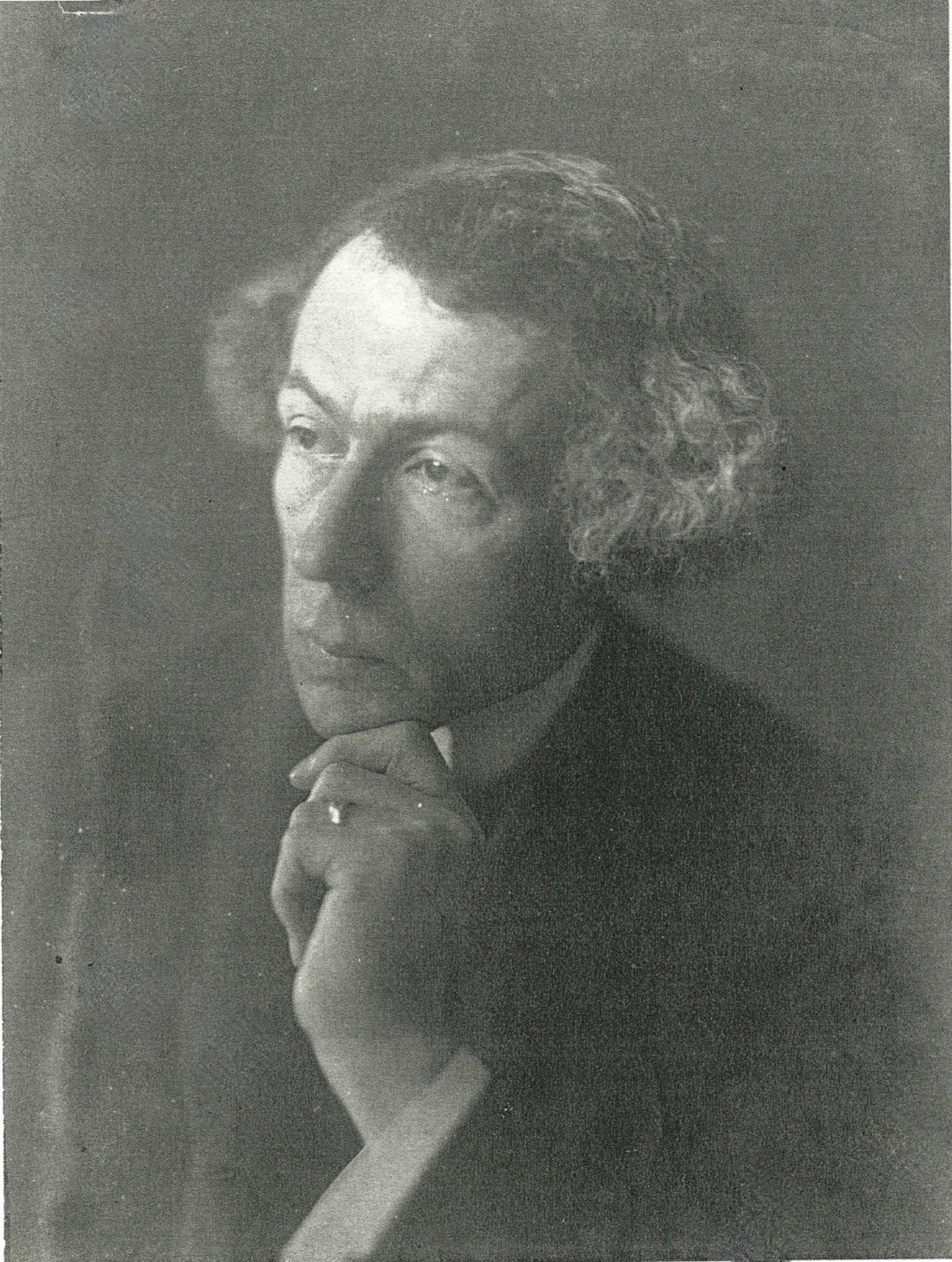
- Salomo Friedlaender
- Born: 4 May 1871; Gollantsch, German Empire
- Died: 9 September 1946 (aged 75); Paris, France
- Occupations: Philosopher, poet, satirist and author

Salomo Friedlaender (4 May 1871 – 9 September 1946) was a German-Jewish philosopher, poet, satirist and author of grotesque and fantastic literature. He published his literary work under the pseudonym Mynona, which is "anonym", the German word for "anonymous", spelled backwards. He is known for his philosophical ideas on dualism drawing on Immanuel Kant, and his avant-garde poetry and fiction. Almost none of his work has been translated into English.

== Life ==
In 1894 he graduated from Gymnasium in Freiburg im Breisgau. Between 1894 and 1902, Friedlaender studied medicine, philosophy, German literature, archaeology, and art history in Munich, Berlin, and Jena. He wrote his dissertation on Arthur Schopenhauer and Kant. He approached the contemporary problems of his day through the lens of Kantian philosophy, in the footsteps of his teacher, the neo-Kantian Ernst Marcus. His most philosophical work, Die schöpferische Indifferenz (1918), Friedlaender built upon Kant's ideas to move beyond the classical dualism of subject and object in a purified, absolute self.

In 1906, Friedlaender moved to Berlin and began to publish literary writing under the pseudonym Mynona. He wrote several novels and countless poems and grotesques which were widely published in Expressionist periodicals such as Der Sturm and Die Aktion. He was part of the Berlin expressionist circle of Herwarth Walden, Else Lasker-Schueler, and Samuel Lublinski and an attraction at their public readings.

In 1933, he fled to Paris to escape the rise of the Nazi Party in Germany. In Paris, he wrote about confronting the will to annihilation of the Nazis by answering torture with laughter.

He was refused assistance to emigrate to the United States during World War II.

== Work ==
Almost none of Friedlander's work has been translated into English. In 2014, an English translation of The Creator was published by Wakefield Press alongside a translation of "A Wearisome Wedding Night: A Grotesque". Additionally, a translation of a tale by Friedlaender appears in The operated Jew : two tales of anti-semitism.

=== Literature ===
- Durch blaue Schleier. Gedichte. A. R. Meyer, Berlin 1908. Erschien unter dem Namen Salomo Friedlaender.
- Rosa, die schöne Schutzmannsfrau. Grotesken. Verlag der Weißen Bücher, Leipzig 1913
- Für Hunde und andere Menschen. Der Sturm, Berlin 1914
- Schwarz-Weiß-Rot. Grotesken. Kurt Wolff Verlag, Leipzig 1916
- Hundert Bonbons. Sonette. Deckelzeichnung von Alfred Kubin. Georg Müller, München 1918
- Die Bank der Spötter. Ein Unroman. Kurt Wolff, München 1919
- The Creator. With illustrations by Alfred Kubin. Original publication: Kurt Wolff, München 1920. Published in English by Wakefield Press, 2014.
- Nur für Herrschaften. Un-Freud-ige Grotesken. Banas & Dette, Hannover 1920
- Unterm Leichentuch. Ein Nachtstück. Paul Steegemann, Hannover 1920 (mit Kubin-Illustrationen erstmals 1927)
- Mein Papa und die Jungfrau von Orléans. Nebst anderen Grotesken. Kurt Wolff, München 1921. Published in English as My Papa and the Maid of Orléans (and Other Grotesques), translated by W.C. Bamberger, Wakefield Press, 2017
- Das widerspenstige Brautbett und andere Grotesken. Kurt Wolff, München 1921
- Graue Magie. Berliner Nachschlüsselroman. Mit 6 Zeichnungen von Lothar Hohmeyer. Rudolf Kaemmerer, Dresden 1922. Reprint: Fannei & Walz 1989. Neuausgabe Ullstein, Berlin 1998, ISBN 3-548-24512-9
- Trappistenstreik und andere Grotesken. Walter Heinrich, Freiburg (Breisgau) 1922
- The Operated Goy. 1922. Published in English by Routledge (UK), 1991. ISBN 0-415-90461-7
- Tarzaniade Parodie. Verlag der Tageblatt-Buchhandlung, Hannover 1924
- Ich möchte bellen und andere Grotesken. Seeigel, Berlin 1924
- Das Eisenbahnglück oder der Anti-Freud Elena Gottschalk Vlg, Berlin 1925. Mit 10 Illustr. v. Hans Bellmer
- Mein hundertster Geburtstag und andere Grimassen. Jahode & Siegel, Wien 1928
- Hat Erich Maria Remarque wirklich gelebt? Der Mann. Das Werk. Der Genius. 1000 Worte Remarque. Paul Steegemann, Berlin & Leipzig 1929
- Der Holzweg zurück oder Knackes Umgang mit Flöhen. Paul Steegemann, Berlin 1931
- Der lachende Hiob und andere Grotesken. Editions du Phénix, Paris 1935

=== Philosophy ===
- Robert Mayer. Theodor Thomas, Leipzig 1905
- Logik. Die Lehre vom Denken. H. Hillger, Berlin 1907
- Psychologie. Die Lehre von der Seele. H. Hillger, Berlin 1907
- Jean Paul als Denker. Gedanken aus seinen sämtlichen Werken. Hrsgg. von Salomo Friedlaender. Piper, München 1907
- Schopenhauer. Brevier. Robert Lutz, Stuttgart 1907
- Friedrich Nietzsche. Eine intellektuale Biographie. Göschen, Berlin 1911
- Schöpferische Indifferenz. Müller, München 1918
- Wie durch ein Prisma. Gedanken und Blicke im Zeichen Kants. Taifun, Vlg., Frankfurt 1924
- Kant für Kinder. Fragelehrbuch zum sittlichen Unterricht. Paul Steegemann, Hannover 1924. Neuausgabe 2004. ISBN 3-487-12806-3 Published in English, De Gruyter, 2024. ISBN 978-3-11-099183-3
- Katechismus der Magie. Nach Immanuel Kants „Von der Macht des Gemüts" und Ernst Marcus' „Theorie der natürlichen Magie". In Frage- und Antwortform gemeinfaßlich dargestellt. Merlin verlag, Heidelberg 1926. Neuausgabe: Aurum Vlg., Freiburg 1978, ISBN 3-591-08051-9
- Der Philosoph Ernst Marcus als Nachfolger Kants. Leben und Lehre. Baedeker, Essen, 1930
- Kant gegen Einstein. Fragelehrbuch (Nach Immanuel Kant und Ernst Marcus) zum Unterricht in den vernunftwissenschaftlichen Vorbedingungen der Naturwissenschaft. Der Neue Geist, Berlin 1932
- Das magische Ich. Elemente des kritischen Polarismus. (aus dem Nachlass) 2001, ISBN 3-89528-336-3
- Ich (1871–1936): Autobiographische Skizze. (aus dem Nachlass) 2003, ISBN 3-89528-394-0
- Magie in Knittelversen. (aus dem Nachlass und mit einem Vorwort von Detlef Thiel) 2013, ISBN 978-3-902871-34-3
