= Hartmut Geerken =

German musical artist (1939–2021)

- Born: 15 January 1939; Stuttgart, Germany
- Died: 21 October 2021 (aged 82) Wartaweil, Germany
- Occupations: Musician, composer, writer, journalist, playwright, filmmaker
- Website: www.hartmutgeerken.de

Hartmut Geerken (15 January 1939 – 21 October 2021) was a German musician, composer, writer, journalist, playwright, and filmmaker.

== Life ==
Geerken was born in Stuttgart, read oriental studies, philosophy, German studies and comparative religion in Tübingen and Istanbul, and produced a dissertation on Hellmut Ritter. He gave German language courses in Turkey for the first Turkish guest workers planning to go to Germany. As an employee at the Goethe Institute, he lived in Cairo from 1966 to 1972, in Kabul from 1972 to 1979, and in Athens from 1979 to 1983.

Geerken later lived in the village of Wartaweil, a subdivision of Herrsching am Ammersee, where he died on 21 October 2021, at the age of 82.

== Achievements ==
Geerken was an artist and arts organizer. As a percussionist, he has collaborated with a variety of free jazz musicians such as Sun Ra, John Tchicai, Sainkho Namtchylak. As a poet, he was a practitioner of concrete poetry and organized events such as the annual Bielefeld New Poetry Colloquium. As an actor, he appeared in six films by Herbert Achternbusch and appeared in two of Achternbusch's plays at the Munich Kammerspiele. From 1991 to 1992, he held the Chair of Poetics at the Folkwang Hochschule in Essen.

Geerken was also dedicated to the memory of the German literati Anselm Ruest. When he was on the trail of the estate of Victor Hadwiger, Geerken investigated an uninhabited house in southern France, where he instead found parts of the estate of Ruest, who had died in 1943. Ruest was, along with Mynona, editor of the Stirnerite journal Der Einzige, which was published in a small edition from 1919 to 1925. From the funds of the estate, Geerken found it was possible to reprint a complete set of Der Einzige, which was published in 1980.

In 1979, while living in Afghanistan, Geerken made a study of the ethnomycology of the areas of the country which he visited, co-authoring two papers on the topic. In the second paper, he describes his discovery of a tradition involving the recreational use of the psychoactive mushroom Amanita muscaria among the Parachi-speaking people of the Shutul Valley. In the short paper, Geerken's Shutuli informants describe to him how they find solace from the tedium of the long and bitter winters of the Hindu Kush in the bizarre visions caused by the mushroom, one man believing himself transformed into a tree.

== Awards ==
Munich Literature Year (1984), Schubart Literary Prize (1986), Karl Sczuka Prize for Works of Radio Art: "südwärts, südwärts" (BR 1989) and "hexenring" (BR 1994).

== Major works ==
- Book publications include "murmel gedichte" (1965), "verschiebungen" (1972), "sprünge nach rosa hin" (1981), "poststempel jerusalem" (1993), "kant" (1998), "ogygia: vom ende des südens" (2004), "phos" (2005), "forschungen etc.'" (2006), "klafti" (2007), "kyrill" (2007), "soyd" (2008), "moos" (2008).
- Co-editor of the series "Frühe Texte der Moderne". Editor of the works of Salomo Friedlaender, of various articles from expressionists, dadaists, and anarchists from the first half of the 20th century, and the German biographer of Sun Ra on "Omniverse Sun Ra", with Chris Trent (1994).
- Compositions, installations, albums, films, and radio plays.
