= Wakefield Press (US) =

American publishing house (founded 2009)

- Founded: 2009
- Founder: Marc Lowenthal and Judy Feldmann
- Country of origin: United States
- Headquarters location: Cambridge, Massachusetts
- Distribution: Distributed Art Publishers
- Publication types: Books
- Official website: wakefieldpress.com

Wakefield Press is an American independent publishing house based in Cambridge, Massachusetts. The press specializes in publishing avant-garde literature in translation. Wakefield was founded in 2009 by Marc Lowenthal and Judy Feldmann. The aim of the company is to increase the availability in English of obscure and avant garde authors from the past who wrote in foreign languages.

Wakefield has been praised in the literary world for its promotion of provocative and unusual texts, as well as for its introductions to each text with detailed information relevant to the author's life, and background providing context for the nature of the author's work.

Wakefield publishes the SubVerse and the Imagining Science book series.

== Notable authors ==
- Marcel Schwob
- Unica Zürn
- Paul Scheerbart
- Charles Fourier
- Pierre Louÿs
- Honoré de Balzac
- Léon Bloy
- Salomo Friedlaender
