= International Micropatrological Society =

Defunct learned society and research institute

- Formation: 1973
- Founder: Frederick W. Lehmann IV
- Founded at: St. Louis, Missouri
- Dissolved: 1988; 38 years ago
- Legal status: Defunct
- Headquarters: 4554 McPherson Avenue, St. Louis, Missouri, United States 63108; 130 Wooton Road, King's Lynn, Norfolk, England
- Official language: English
- Owner: Frederick W. Lehmann IV (president); Christopher Martin (vice-president)

The International Micropatrological Society (IMS) was an American learned society and research institute dedicated to the study of micronations. Founded in 1973 by Frederick W. Lehmann IV of St. Louis, Missouri, the IMS coined micropatrology as the study of micronations and micronationalism. It had documented 128 micronations and similar political entities by 1976.

The IMS assessed the legitimacy of micronational claims in five categories—B ("bogus"), E ("extinct"), F ("fiction"), T ("traditional") and O ("other"); according to the IMS, only micronations rated T or O had good chances of achieving independence. Owned by Lehmann and Christopher Martin, the IMS had offices in St. Louis, Missouri and King's Lynn, Norfolk, England. According to the Yearbook of International Organizations, the IMS was disestablished in 1988.

== History ==
The IMS was founded in 1973 by Frederick W. Lehmann IV of St. Louis, Missouri. It was the first organisation dedicated to studying micronations. In 1977, documents from the IMS supposedly supporting the legitimacy of the Most Serene Federal Republic of Montmartre were used in a court case by Montmartre President Barry Alan Richmond to advocate for the micronation's inclusion in the phone directory of New York Telephone. The IMS contributed its research to Erwin Strauss's 1979 How to Start Your Own Country about micronations. According to the Yearbook of International Organizations, the IMS was disestablished in 1988.

=== Aftermath ===
In 1996, Swiss author Fabrice O'Driscoll of Aix-Marseille University founded the French Institute of Micropatrology (French: l'Institut français de micropatrologie) as an unofficial continuation of the IMS. In 2000, O'Driscoll wrote the book Ils ne siègent pas à l'ONU: revue de quelques micro-Etats, micro-nations et autres entités éphémères (They don't sit at the UN: a review of some micro-states, micro-nations and other ephemeral entities), which details over 600 micronations. As of 2009, the records of the IMS were stored in a rented room in an office building in downtown St. Louis, where Lehmann had been storing various other possessions such as Chippendale furniture since 1998.
