= Bruno Fuligni =

French writer and historian

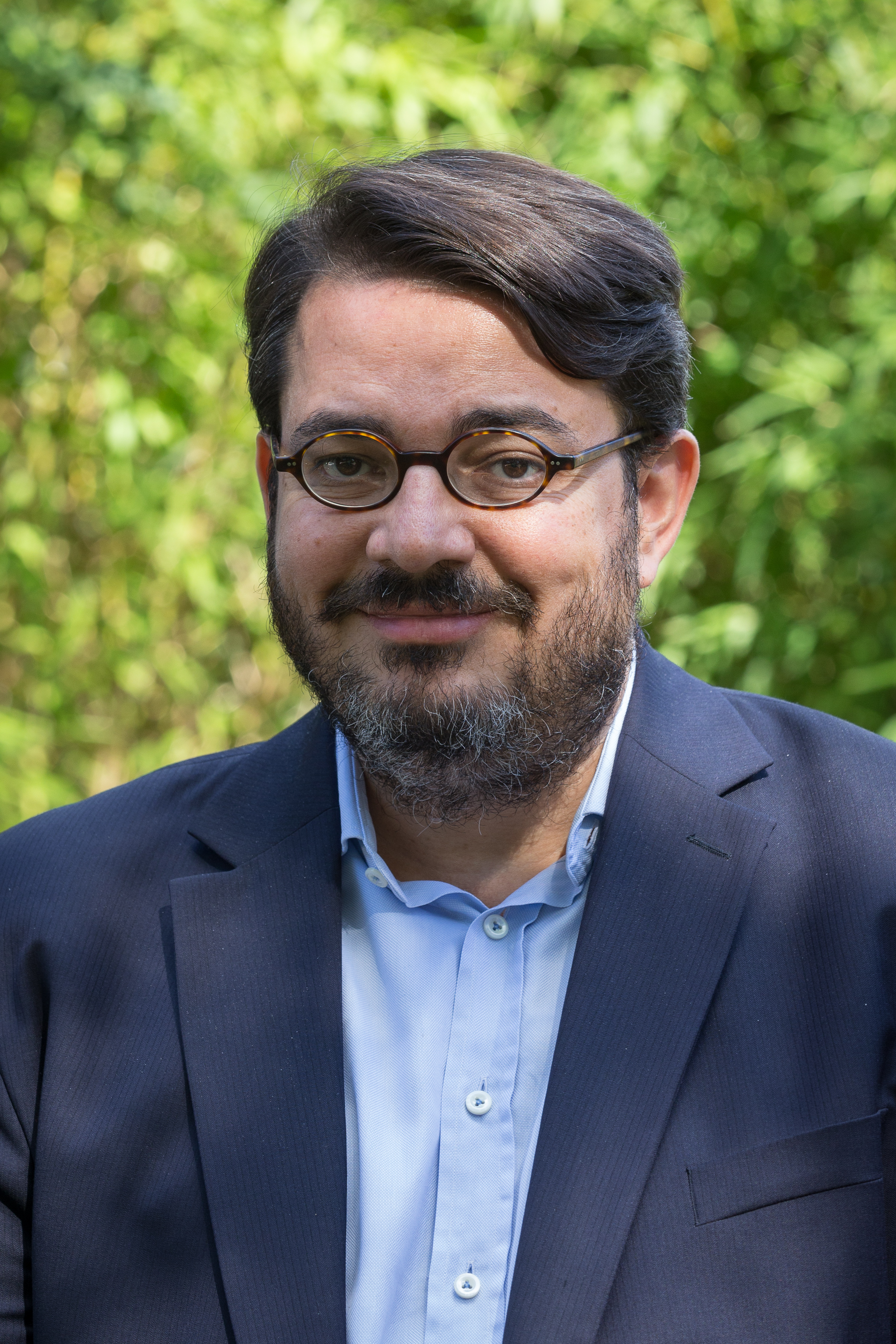
Fuligni during International Festival of Geography 2015 in Saint-Dié-des-Vosges

Bruno Fuligni (born 21 May 1968) is a French writer and historian.

== Selected works ==
- L'Etat c'est moi: histoire des monarchies privées, principautés de fantaisie et autres républiques pirates. Éditions de Paris. 1997.
- La police des écrivains (The writers' police). Horay. 2006. ISBN 2-7058-0436-6.
- Les quinze mille députés d'hier et d'aujourd'hui (The fifteen thousand deputies from yesterday and today). Horay. 2006. ISBN 2-7058-0439-0.
- The Case of Alan Turing (illustrated essay). Arsenal Pulp Press. 2016. The Cryptography War. ISBN 9781551526508.
- Atlantes des zones extraterrestres (ed.Flammarion, 2017) ISBN 978-88-6722-373-2
- L'affreux du Panthéon (in French). Editions de la Table Ronde. 2018. ISBN 9782710379058.
