= List of Cambridge University Press book series =

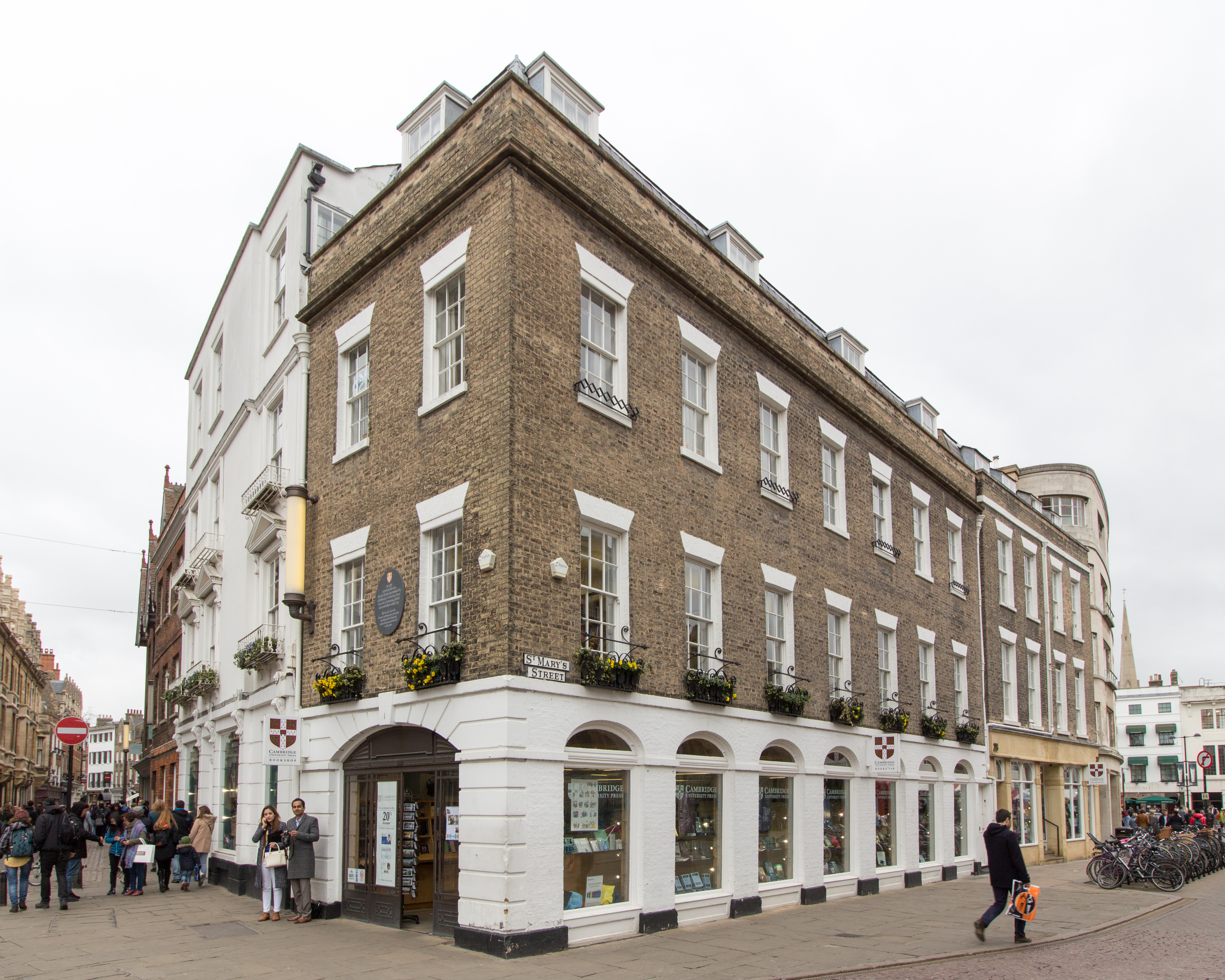
Cambridge University Press shop, Cambridge

This is a list of book series published by Cambridge University Press.

== Anthropology ==
Among the book series in anthropology published by Cambridge University Press are:

- Atelier d'Anthropologie Sociale
- Biosocial Society Symposium Series
- Cambridge Handbooks in Anthropology
- Cambridge Library Collection - Anthropology
- Cambridge Library Collection - Travel, Europe
- Cambridge Library Collection - Travel, Middle East and Asia Minor
- Cambridge Papers in Social Anthropology
- Cambridge Studies in Cultural Systems
- Cambridge Studies in Oral and Literate Culture
- Cambridge Studies in Social and Cultural Anthropology
- Changing Culture Series
- Culture and Psychology (book series)|Culture and Psychology
- Key Topics in Linguistic Anthropology
- Language Culture and Cognition
- Lewis Henry Morgan Lectures
- New Departures in Anthropology
- New Perspectives on Anthropological and Social Demography
- Publications of the Society for Psychological Anthropology
- Res Monographs in Anthropology and Aesthetics
- Studies in Interactional Sociolinguistics
- Studies in Literacy, the Family, Culture and the State
- University of Cambridge Oriental Publications

== Archaeology ==
Among the book series in archaeology published by Cambridge University Press are:

- Archaeology of the North
- British School at Athens Studies in Greek Antiquity
- British School at Rome Studies
- Cambridge Library Collection - Archaeology
- Cambridge Library Collection - Egyptology
- Cambridge Manuals in Archaeology
- Cambridge Studies in Archaeology
- Cambridge World Archaeology
- Case Studies in Early Societies
- Guides to the Coinage of the Ancient World
- New Directions in Archaeology
- New Directions in Sustainability and Society
- New Studies in Archaeology
- Topics in Contemporary Archaeology

== Area studies ==
Among the book series in area studies published by Cambridge University Press are:

- African Studies
- Global Health Histories
- The International African Library
- New Approaches to African History

== Art ==
Among the book series in the arts published by Cambridge University Press are:

- Cambridge Film Classics
- Cambridge Library Collection - Art and Architecture
- Cambridge Studies in the History of Art
- Contemporary Artists and their Critics
- Fitzwilliam Museum Handbooks
- Fitzwilliam Museum Publications
- Greater Medieval Houses

== Chemistry ==
Among the book series in chemistry published by Cambridge University Press are:

- Cambridge Molecular Science
- Chemistry of Solid State Materials

== Classical Studies ==
Among the book series in classical studies published by Cambridge University Press are:

- Armies of the Ancient World
- British School at Athens Studies in Greek Antiquity
- British School at Rome Studies
- The Cambridge Ancient History
- Cambridge Classical Studies
- Cambridge Classical Texts and Commentaries
- Cambridge Companions to the Ancient World
- Cambridge Galen Translations
- Cambridge Greek and Latin Classics
- Cambridge Greek Testament Commentaries
- The Cambridge History of Classical Literature
- The Cambridge History of Judaism
- The Cambridge History of Political Thought
- Cambridge Intermediate Latin Readers
- Cambridge Introduction to Roman Civilization
- Cambridge Library Collection - Classics
- Cambridge Studies in the Dialogues of Plato (Note: This series aims in particular assess the individual Platonic dialogues "as integrated wholes".)
- The Cambridge World History of Slavery
- Classics after Antiquity
- Companions to Ancient Thought
- The Greek Cosmologists
- Greek Culture in the Roman World
- Guides to the Coinage of the Ancient World
- Key Conflicts of Classical Antiquity
- Key Themes in Ancient History
- Key Themes in Ancient Philosophy
- Proclus: Commentary on Plato's Republic
- Proclus: Commentary on Plato's Timaeus
- Reading Greek
- Roman Literature and its Contexts
- Society for New Testament Studies Monograph Series
- Translated Documents of Greece and Rome
- The W. B. Stanford Memorial Lectures
- Yale Classical Studies

== Computer Science ==
Among the book series in computer science published by Cambridge University Press are:

- The Ada Companion Series
- Artificial Intelligence for Social Good
- Breakthroughs in Application Development
- British Computer Society Conference Series
- British Computer Society Workshop Series
- Cambridge Computer Science Texts
- Cambridge International Series on Parallel Computation
- Cambridge Series on Human-Computer Interaction
- Cambridge Tracts in Theoretical Computer Science
- Distinguished Dissertations in Computer Science
- Lecture Notes in Logic
- Perspectives in Logic
- SIGS: Advances in Object Technology
- Studies in Natural Language Processing

== Drama and Theatre ==
Among the book series in drama and the theatre published by Cambridge University Press are:

- The Cambridge History of British Theatre
- Cambridge Studies in Modern Theatre
- Theatre and Performance Theory

== Earth and Environmental Sciences ==
Among the book series in earth and environmental sciences published by Cambridge University Press are:

- Cambridge Atmospheric and Space Science Series
- Cambridge Earth Science Series
- Cambridge Energy and Environment Series
- Cambridge Environmental Chemistry Series
- Cambridge Library Collection - Earth Science
- Cambridge Library Collection - Monographs of the Palaeontographical Society
- Cambridge Paleobiology Series
- Cambridge Topics in Mineral Physics and Chemistry
- Cambridge Topics in Petrology
- Elements of Paleontology
- International Hydrology Series
- New Directions in Sustainability and Society
- Organizations and the Natural Environment
- Special Publications of the International Union of Geodesy and Geophysics
- Studies in Polar Research
- Topics in Remote Sensing
- World and Regional Geology

== Economics ==
50 results in Economics

- The American Law Institute Reporters Studies on WTO Law
- Bilateral and Regional Trade Agreements
- Cambridge Economic Handbooks
- The Cambridge Economic History of Europe
- The Cambridge Economic History of India
- Cambridge Economic History of the United States
- Cambridge International Trade and Economic Law
- Cambridge Studies in Economics, Choice, and Society
- Cambridge Studies in Stratification Economics: Economics and Social Identity
- Cambridge Studies in the Emergence of Global Enterprise
- Cambridge Studies on Governing Knowledge Commons
- Cambridge Surveys of Economic Literature
- Cambridge Tax Law Series
- Churchill Lectures in Economics
- The CICSE Lectures in Growth and Development
- The Collected Writings of John Maynard Keynes
- Comparative Perspectives in Business History
- Contemporary South Asia
- Department of Applied Economics Occasional Papers
- Development Trajectories in Global Value Chains
- Econometric Exercises
- Econometric Society Monographs
- Elements in Austrian Economics
- Elements in Evolutionary Economics
- Elements in Public Economics
- Elements in the Politics of Development
- Federico Caffè Lectures
- Health Economics, Policy and Management
- Historical Perspectives on Modern Economics
- Intellectual Property, Innovation and Economic Development
- International Symposia in Economic Theory and Econometrics
- Japan-US Center UFJ Bank Monographs on International Financial Markets
- Mastering Mathematical Finance
- Mathematics, Finance and Risk
- Modern Cambridge Economics Series
- National Institute of Economic and Social Research Economic and Social Studies
- New Approaches to Economic and Social History
- Oscar Morgenstern Memorial Lectures
- Physics of Society: Econophysics and Sociophysics
- Quantitative Methods for Applied Economics and Business Research
- Raffaele Mattioli Lectures
- The Stone Lectures in Economics
- Studies in Economic History and Policy
- Studies in Economic History and Policy: USA in the Twentieth Century
- Studies in Macroeconomic History
- Themes in Modern Econometrics
- Trade and Development
- The World Since 1980
- World Trade Organization Dispute Settlement Reports
- Wye Studies in Agricultural and Rural Development

== Education ==
3 results in Education

- Cambridge Library Collection - Education
- Cambridge Studies in the Comparative Politics of Education
- Cambridge Texts and Studies in the History of Education

== Engineering ==
21 results in Engineering

- Advances in Microscopy and Microanalysis
- Cambridge Aerospace Series
- Cambridge Engine Technology Series
- Cambridge IISc Series
- Cambridge Library Collection - Physical Sciences
- Cambridge Library Collection - Technology
- Cambridge Ocean Technology Series
- The Cambridge RF and Microwave Engineering Series
- Cambridge Series in Chemical Engineering
- Cambridge Studies in Modern Optics
- Cambridge Studies in Semiconductor Physics and Microelectronic Engineering
- Cambridge Texts in Biomedical Engineering
- The Cambridge Wireless Essentials Series
- Electronics Texts for Engineers and Scientists
- Elements in Emerging Theories and Technologies in Metamaterials
- Elements in Flexible and Large-Area Electronics
- EuMA High Frequency Technologies Series
- MRS-Cambridge Materials Fundamentals
- SIGS: Managing Object Technology
- SIGS Reference Library

== Film, Media, Mass Communication ==
5 results in Film, Media, Mass Communication

- Cambridge Film Handbooks
- Cambridge Studies in Film
- Communication, Society and Politics
- Genres in American Cinema
- National Film Traditions

== General Science ==
10 results in General Science

- Cambridge Centennial of Flight
- Cambridge Library Collection - History of Science
- Cambridge Science Biographies
- Cambridge Science Classics
- Cambridge Studies in the History of Medicine
- Cambridge Studies in the History of Psychology
- Cambridge Studies in the History of Science
- Cometography
- Darwin College Lectures
- Needham Research Institute Studies

== Geography ==
15 results in Geography

- Cambridge Geographical Studies
- Cambridge Human Geography
- Cambridge Library Collection - African Studies
- Cambridge Library Collection - History of Oceania
- Cambridge Library Collection - Latin American Studies
- Cambridge Library Collection - Maritime Exploration
- Cambridge Library Collection - North American History
- Cambridge Library Collection - Polar Exploration
- Cambridge Library Collection - The Nautical Magazine
- Cambridge Library Collection - Travel and Exploration in Asia
- Cambridge Studies in Historical Geography
- Cambridge Urban and Architectural Studies
- Domesday Geography of England
- Environment and Behavior
- Geography of the World-Economy

== History ==
142 results in History

- African Studies
- Afro-Latin America
- Armies of the Ancient World
- Armies of the Great War
- Armies of the Second World War
- Asian Connections
- Australian Army History Series
- British Lives
- Cambridge Centennial of Flight
- The Cambridge China Library
- Cambridge Commonwealth Series
- Cambridge Concise Histories
- Cambridge Essential Histories
- Cambridge Galen Translations
- The Cambridge History of Africa
- Cambridge History of Britain
- The Cambridge History of China
- Cambridge History of Christianity
- The Cambridge History of Communism
- The Cambridge History of Egypt
- Cambridge History of Europe
- The Cambridge History of Ireland
- The Cambridge History of Japan
- The Cambridge History of Latin America
- The Cambridge History of Law in America
- The Cambridge History of Modern European Thought
- Cambridge History of Religions in America
- The Cambridge History of Russia
- The Cambridge History of Scandinavia
- The Cambridge History of Science
- Cambridge History of South Africa
- The Cambridge History of the American Civil War
- The Cambridge History of the Cold War
- The Cambridge History of the First World War
- The Cambridge history of the Native Peoples of the Americas
- The Cambridge History of the Second World War
- Cambridge History of Turkey
- Cambridge History of War
- Cambridge Library Collection - African Studies
- Cambridge Library Collection - British and Irish History, 15th & 16th Centuries
- Cambridge Library Collection - British and Irish History, 19th Century
- Cambridge Library Collection - British and Irish History, General
- Cambridge Library Collection - British & Irish History, 17th & 18th Centuries
- Cambridge Library Collection - East and South-East Asian History
- Cambridge Library Collection - European History
- Cambridge Library Collection - Hakluyt First Series
- Cambridge Library Collection - History
- Cambridge Library Collection - History of Medicine
- Cambridge Library Collection - History of Oceania
- Cambridge Library Collection - Latin American Studies
- Cambridge Library Collection - Maritime Exploration
- Cambridge Library Collection - Medieval History
- Cambridge Library Collection - Naval and Military History
- Cambridge Library Collection - Naval Chronicle
- Cambridge Library Collection - North American History
- Cambridge Library Collection - Perspectives from the Royal Asiatic Society
- Cambridge Library Collection - Rolls
- Cambridge Library Collection - Slavery and Abolition
- Cambridge Library Collection - South Asian History
- Cambridge Library Collection - The Nautical Magazine
- Cambridge Library Collection - Travel and Exploration in Asia
- Cambridge Library Collection - Travel, Europe
- Cambridge Library Collection - Travel, Middle East and Asia Minor
- Cambridge Medieval Textbooks
- Cambridge Middle East Library
- Cambridge Middle East Studies
- Cambridge Military Histories
- Cambridge Modern China Series
- Cambridge Oceanic Histories
- Cambridge Social and Cultural Histories
- Cambridge South Asian Studies
- Cambridge Studies in Chinese History, Literature and Institutions
- Cambridge Studies in Early Modern British History
- Cambridge Studies in Early Modern History
- Cambridge Studies in Economic History
- Cambridge Studies in Economic History - Second Series
- Cambridge Studies in Eighteenth-Century English Literature and Thought
- Cambridge Studies in Indian History and Society
- Cambridge Studies in Islamic Civilization
- Cambridge Studies in Italian History and Culture
- Cambridge Studies in Medieval Life and Thought: Fourth Series
- Cambridge Studies in Medieval Life and Thought: New Series
- Cambridge Studies in Medieval Life and Thought: Third Series
- Cambridge Studies in Modern Economic History
- Cambridge Studies in Population, Economy and Society in Past Time
- Cambridge Studies in Religion and American Public Life
- Cambridge Studies in the History of Medicine
- Cambridge Studies in the History of the People's Republic of China
- Cambridge Studies in US Foreign Relations
- Cambridge Studies on the African Diaspora
- Cambridge Studies on the American South
- The Cambridge Urban History of Britain
- The Cambridge World History
- The Cambridge World History of Slavery
- The China Quarterly Special Issues
- The CICSE Lectures in Growth and Development
- Comprehensive Surveys of Religion
- Contemporary China Institute Publications
- Critical Perspectives on Empire
- Elements in Religion and Violence
- Global and International History
- Global Health Histories
- The Global Middle East
- The Heads of Religious Houses
- A History of the University in Europe
- History of the University of Cambridge
- Human Rights in History
- Interdisciplinary Perspectives on Modern History
- International Review of Social History Supplements
- Medieval European Coinage
- Modern British Histories
- New Approaches to African History
- New Approaches to Asian History
- New Approaches to European History
- New Approaches to the Americas
- New Approaches to the History of Science and Medicine
- New Histories of American Law
- New Studies in Economic and Social History
- New Studies in European History
- Past and Present Publications
- Publications of the German Historical Institute
- Science in History
- Slaveries since Emancipation
- A Social History of England
- Sources of History
- Studies in Australian History
- Studies in Church History
- Studies in Comparative Early Modern History
- Studies in Comparative World History
- Studies in Environment and History
- Studies in Interdisciplinary History
- Studies in Legal History
- Studies in Modern Capitalism
- Studies in North American Indian History
- Studies in the Social and Cultural History of Modern Warfare
- Woodrow Wilson Center Press

== Language and Linguistics ==
27 results in Language and Linguistics

- Cambridge Approaches to Language Contact
- Cambridge Approaches to Linguistics
- Cambridge Handbooks in Language and Linguistics
- The Cambridge History of the English Language
- Cambridge Introductions to Language and Linguistics
- Cambridge Introductions to the English Language
- Cambridge Language Surveys
- Cambridge Library Collection - Linguistics
- Cambridge Studies in Cognitive Linguistics
- Cambridge Studies in Linguistics
- Cambridge Studies in Speech Science and Communication
- Cambridge Syntax Guides
- Cambridge Textbooks in Linguistics
- Key Topics in Applied Linguistics
- Key Topics in Phonology
- Key Topics in Semantics and Pragmatics
- Key Topics in Sociolinguistics
- Key Topics in Syntax
- Language Culture and Cognition
- Papers in Laboratory Phonology
- Princeton/Cambridge Studies in Chinese Linguistics
- Reference Grammars
- Research Surveys in Linguistics
- Studies in English Language
- Studies in Language Variation and Change
- Studies in Natural Language Processing
- Studies in the Social and Cultural Foundations of Language

== Law ==
64 results in Law

- The American Law Institute Reporters Studies on WTO Law
- Antitrust and Competition Law
- ASCL Studies in Comparative Law
- ASIL Studies in International Legal Theory
- Bilateral and Regional Trade Agreements
- Cambridge Asylum and Migration Studies
- Cambridge Bioethics and Law
- Cambridge Companions to Law
- Cambridge Disability Law and Policy Series
- Cambridge Historical Studies in American Law and Society
- The Cambridge History of Law in America
- Cambridge Intellectual Property and Information Law
- Cambridge International Trade and Economic Law
- Cambridge Introductions to Philosophy and Law
- Cambridge Law, Medicine and Ethics
- Cambridge Studies in Constitutional Law
- Cambridge Studies in Corporate Law
- Cambridge Studies in Election Law and Democracy
- Cambridge Studies in English Legal History
- Cambridge Studies in European Law and Policy
- Cambridge Studies in International and Comparative Law
- Cambridge Studies in Law and Judaism
- Cambridge Studies in Law and Society
- Cambridge Studies in Transnational Law
- Cambridge Studies on Civil Rights and Civil Liberties
- Cambridge Studies on Environment, Energy and Natural Resources Governance
- Cambridge Studies on Governing Knowledge Commons
- Cambridge Studies on the American Constitution
- Cambridge Tax Law Series
- Commentaries on the 1949 Geneva Conventions
- The Common Core of European Private Law
- Comparative Constitutional Law and Policy
- Connecting International Law with Public Law
- European Inter-University Centre for Human Rights and Democratisation
- Feminist Judgment Series: Rewritten Judicial Opinions
- Global Competition Law and Economics Policy
- Global Law Series
- Globalization and Human Rights
- The Hamlyn Lectures
- Hersch Lauterpacht Memorial Lectures
- Human Rights in History
- Integration through Law:The Role of Law and the Rule of Law in ASEAN Integration
- Intellectual Property, Innovation and Economic Development
- International Convention on the Settlement of Investment Disputes Reports
- International Corporate Law and Financial Market Regulation
- The International Criminal Law Practitioner
- International Law Reports
- IUCN Academy of Environmental Law Research Studies
- Law and Christianity
- Law in Context
- Law Practitioner Series
- Max Planck Trialogues
- Merger Control Worldwide
- New Histories of American Law
- Shared Responsibility in International Law
- Studies in Legal History
- Studies on Human Rights Conventions
- Studies on International Courts and Tribunals
- Themes in Islamic Law
- Treaty Implementation for Sustainable Development
- United States Practices in International Law
- World Trade Organization
- World Trade Organization Dispute Settlement Reports
- World Trade Organization Legal Texts

== Life Sciences ==
52 results in Life Sciences

- Advances in Microscopy and Microanalysis
- Advances in Molecular and Cellular Microbiology
- Biological Conservation, Restoration, and Sustainability
- The Biology of Horticultural Crops
- Biotechnology Research
- British Mycological Society Symposia
- British Plant Communities
- Cambridge Fundamentals of Neuroscience in Psychology
- Cambridge Handbooks in Behavioral Genetics
- Cambridge Library Collection - Botany and Horticulture
- Cambridge Library Collection - Darwin, Evolution and Genetics
- Cambridge Library Collection - Monographs of the Palaeontographical Society
- Cambridge Library Collection - Zoology
- Cambridge Molecular Imaging Series
- Cambridge Monographs in Experimental Biology
- Cambridge Series in Systems Genetics
- Cambridge Social Neuroscience
- Cambridge Studies in Adaptive Dynamics
- Cambridge Studies in Applied Ecology and Resource Management
- Cambridge Studies in Biological and Evolutionary Anthropology
- Cambridge Studies in Biotechnology
- Cambridge Studies in Ecology
- Cambridge Studies in Landscape Ecology
- Cambridge Studies in Morphology and Molecules: New Paradigms in Evolutionary Bio
- Cambridge Texts in Chemistry and Biochemistry
- Cambridge Texts in Physiological Sciences
- Cambridge Tropical Biology Series
- Conservation Biology
- The Correspondence of Charles Darwin
- Developmental and Cell Biology Series
- Ecological Reviews
- Ecology, Biodiversity and Conservation
- Elements of Paleontology
- Emory Symposia in Cognition
- Flora Europaea
- Flora of Great Britain and Ireland
- Intercellular and Intracellular Communication
- International Biological Programme Synthesis Series
- Living Resources for Biotechnology
- Monographs of the Physiological Society
- Monographs on Marsupial Biology
- Problems in the Behavioural Sciences
- Reproduction in Mammals Series
- Society for Experimental Biology Seminar Series
- Society for General Microbiology Symposia
- Society for the Study of Human Biology Symposium Series
- State of the Apes
- Studies in Biology
- Studies in Biology Series
- Symposia of the Zoological Society of London
- Systematics Association Special Volume Series
- Water Science Review

== Literature ==
63 results in Literature

- After Series
- American Critical Archives
- American Literature in Transition
- The American Novel
- Anglo-Saxon England
- British and American Playwrights
- British and Irish Authors
- British Literature in Transition
- Cambridge Companions to American Studies
- Cambridge Companions to Culture
- Cambridge Companions to Literature
- Cambridge Critical Concepts
- The Cambridge Edition of the Correspondence of Samuel Richardson
- The Cambridge Edition of the Works of Joseph Conrad
- The Cambridge Edition of the Works of Schopenhauer
- Cambridge English Prose Texts
- Cambridge Grammatical Descriptions
- The Cambridge History of American Literature
- Cambridge History of American Theatre
- The Cambridge History of Libraries in Britain and Ireland
- The Cambridge History of Literary Criticism
- The Cambridge History of the Book in Britain
- Cambridge Introductions to Literature
- Cambridge Library Collection - English Men of Letters
- Cambridge Library Collection - Fiction and Poetry
- Cambridge Library Collection - History of Printing, Publishing and Libraries
- Cambridge Library Collection - Literary Studies
- Cambridge Library Collection - The Works of Carlyle
- Cambridge Library Collection - Works of John Ruskin
- Cambridge Medieval Classics
- Cambridge Studies in African and Caribbean Literature
- Cambridge Studies in American Literature and Culture
- Cambridge Studies in American Theatre and Drama
- Cambridge Studies in Anglo-Saxon England
- Cambridge Studies in French
- Cambridge Studies in German
- Cambridge Studies in Latin American and Iberian Literature
- Cambridge Studies in Medieval Literature
- Cambridge Studies in Nineteenth-Century Literature and Culture
- Cambridge Studies in Palaeography and Codicology
- Cambridge Studies in Publishing and Printing History
- Cambridge Studies in Renaissance Literature and Culture
- Cambridge Studies in Romanticism
- Cambridge Studies in Russian Literature
- Cambridge Studies in Twenty-First Century Literature and Culture
- Conference on British Studies Bibliographical Handbooks
- Cultural Margins
- Early Modern Literature in Transition
- Elements in Publishing and Book Culture
- The Empson Lectures
- A History of the Bible as Literature
- Landmarks of World Literature
- Landmarks of World Literature (New)
- Literature in Context
- Major European Authors Series
- Methods in Biblical Interpretation
- The New Cambridge Shakespeare
- On Screen
- Reading Writers and their Work
- Shakespeare on Screen
- Shakespeare Survey
- Twenty-First-Century Critical Revisions
- The Value of

== Management ==
10 results in Management

- Business and Public Policy
- Business, Value Creation, and Society
- Cambridge Companions to Management
- Cambridge Short Introductions to Management
- Cambridge Studies in Management
- Development Trajectories in Global Value Chains
- Elements in Business Strategy
- Elements in Corporate Governance
- Elements in Organization Theory
- Organizations and the Natural Environment

== Materials Science ==
2 results in Materials Science

- Elements in Emerging Theories and Technologies in Metamaterials
- MRS-Cambridge Materials Fundamentals

== Mathematics ==
31 results in Mathematics

- Acta Numerica
- AIMS Library of Mathematical Sciences
- Australian Mathematical Society Lecture Series
- Cambridge IISc Series
- Cambridge Library Collection - Mathematics
- Cambridge Mathematical Library
- Cambridge Mathematical Textbooks
- Cambridge Monographs on Applied and Computational Mathematics
- Cambridge Monographs on Mechanics
- Cambridge Studies in Advanced Mathematics
- Cambridge Studies in Mathematical Biology
- Cambridge Texts in Applied Mathematics
- Cambridge Tracts in Mathematics
- Classroom Resource Materials
- Elements in the Philosophy of Mathematics
- Encyclopedia of Mathematics and its Applications
- ICMI Studies
- Institute of Mathematical Statistics Textbooks
- Lecture Notes in Logic
- Lezioni Lincee
- London Mathematical Society Lecture Note Series
- London Mathematical Society Student Texts
- London School of Economics Mathematics
- Mastering Mathematical Finance
- Mathematical Sciences Research Institute Publications
- Mathematics, Finance and Risk
- New Mathematical Monographs
- Outlooks
- Perspectives in Logic
- Publications of the Newton Institute
- Spectrum

== Medicine ==
29 results in Medicine

- Advances in Molecular and Cellular Microbiology
- Cambridge Bioethics and Law
- Cambridge Clinical Guides
- Cambridge Illustrated Surgical Pathology
- Cambridge Law, Medicine and Ethics
- Cambridge Monographs on Cancer Research
- Cambridge Pocket Clinicians
- Cambridge Reviews in Clinical Immunology
- Cambridge Studies in Medical Anthropology
- Cancer: Clinical Science in Practice
- Case Studies in Neurology
- Chemistry and Pharmacology of Natural Products
- Contemporary Issues in Cancer Imaging
- Core Critical Care
- Cytohistology of Small Tissue Samples
- Diagnostic Pediatric Pathology
- Essential Medical Texts for Students and Trainees
- Fetus and Neonate: Physiology and Clinical Applications
- Handbooks in Practical Animal Cell Biology
- International Research Monographs in the Addictions
- Membership of the Royal College of Obstetricians and Gynaecologists and Beyond
- Progress in Pathology
- QBase
- Recent Advances
- Royal College of Obstetricians and Gynaecologists Advanced Skills
- Royal College of Obstetricians and Gynaecologists Study Group
- Series for the International Neuropsychological Society
- Stahl's Illustrated
- Values-Based Practice

== Music ==
22 results in Music

- Cambridge Companions to Music
- Composer Studies
- Cambridge Handbooks to the Historical Performance of Music
- The Cambridge History of Music
- Cambridge Introductions to Music
- Cambridge Library Collection - Music
- Cambridge Music Handbooks
- Cambridge Musical Texts and Monographs
- Cambridge Opera Handbooks
- Cambridge Readings in the Literature of Music
- Cambridge Studies in Ethnomusicology
- Cambridge Studies in Music
- Cambridge Studies in Music Theory and Analysis
- Cambridge Studies in Opera
- Cambridge Studies in Performance Practice
- Composers in Context
- Music in Context
- Music in the Twentieth Century
- Music since 1900
- Musical Lives
- Musical Performance and Reception
- New Perspectives in Music History and Criticism

== Philosophy ==
46 results in Philosophy

- Cambridge Applied Ethics
- Cambridge Companions to Philosophy
- Cambridge Critical Guides
- The Cambridge Edition of the Works of Immanuel Kant
- The Cambridge Edition of the Works of Schopenhauer
- Cambridge Handbooks in Philosophy
- Cambridge Hegel Translations
- The Cambridge History of Modern European Thought
- Cambridge Introductions to Key Philosophical Texts
- Cambridge Introductions to Philosophy
- Cambridge Introductions to Philosophy and Biology
- The Cambridge Kant German-English Edition
- Cambridge Library Collection - Philosophy
- Cambridge Library Collection - Science and Religion
- Cambridge Philosophical Texts in Context
- Cambridge Philosophy Classics
- Cambridge Studies in Philosophy
- Cambridge Studies in Philosophy and Biology
- Cambridge Studies in Philosophy and Law
- Cambridge Studies in Philosophy and Public Policy
- Cambridge Studies in Philosophy and the Arts
- Cambridge Studies in Probability, Induction and Decision Theory
- Cambridge Studies in Religion, Philosophy, and Society
- Cambridge Texts in the History of Philosophy
- Cambridge Texts in the History of Political Thought
- The Cambridge Translations of Medieval Philosophical Texts
- Classic Philosophical Arguments
- Contemporary Philosophy in Focus
- Critical Reasoning and Argumentation
- Elements in the Philosophy of Biology
- Elements in the Philosophy of Immanuel Kant
- Elements in the Philosophy of Mathematics
- The Evolution of Modern Philosophy
- For and Against
- The German Philosophical Tradition
- Key Themes in Ancient Philosophy
- Literature, Culture, Theory
- Modern European Philosophy
- Proclus: Commentary on Plato's Timaeus
- Royal Institute of Philosophy Supplements
- Social Philosophy and Policy
- Studies in Marxism and Social Theory
- Studies in Philosophy and Health Policy
- Studies in Rationality and Social Change
- Tanner Lectures in Human Values
- Texts in German Philosophy

== Physics and Astronomy ==
26 results in Physics and Astronomy

- AIMS Library of Mathematical Sciences
- Cambridge Astrobiology
- Cambridge Astrophysics
- Cambridge Contemporary Astrophysics
- Cambridge Lecture Notes in Physics
- Cambridge Molecular Science
- Cambridge Monographs on Atomic, Molecular and Chemical Physics
- Cambridge Monographs on Mathematical Physics
- Cambridge Monographs on Particle Physics, Nuclear Physics and Cosmology
- Cambridge Monographs on Physics
- Cambridge Monographs on Plasma Physics
- Cambridge Nonlinear Science Series
- Cambridge Observing Handbooks for Research Astronomers
- Cambridge Planetary Science
- Cambridge Planetary Science Old
- Cambridge Solid State Science Series
- Cambridge Studies in Low Temperature Physics
- Cambridge Studies in Magnetism
- Canary Islands Winter School of Astrophysics
- Collection Alea-Saclay: Monographs and Texts in Statistical Physics
- Montroll Memorial Lecture Series in Mathematical Physics
- MRS-Cambridge Materials Fundamentals
- Physics of Society: Econophysics and Sociophysics
- Practical Astronomy Handbooks
- Proceedings of the International Astronomical Union Symposia and Colloquia
- Student's Guides

== Politics and International Relations ==
81 results in Politics and International Relations

- Advances in Political Science
- African Society Today
- Analytical Methods for Social Research
- Auguste Comte Intellectual Biography
- Business and Public Policy
- Cambridge Asia-Pacific Studies
- The Cambridge History of Political Thought
- The Cambridge History of the Cold War
- Cambridge International Documents Series
- Cambridge Latin American Studies
- Cambridge Library Collection - Spiritualism and Esoteric Knowledge
- Cambridge Middle East Library
- Cambridge Middle East Studies
- Cambridge Russian Paperbacks
- Cambridge Russian, Soviet and Post-Soviet Studies
- Cambridge Studies in Comparative Politics
- Cambridge Studies in Comparative Public Policy
- Cambridge Studies in Contentious Politics
- Cambridge Studies in Economic Policies and Institutions
- Cambridge Studies in Economics, Choice, and Society
- Cambridge Studies in Election Law and Democracy
- Cambridge Studies in Gender and Politics
- Cambridge Studies in Ideology and Religion
- Cambridge Studies in International and Comparative Law
- Cambridge Studies in International Relations
- Cambridge Studies in Modern Political Economies
- Cambridge Studies in the Comparative Politics of Education
- Cambridge Studies in the History and Theory of Politics
- Cambridge Studies in the History of Mass Communication
- Cambridge Studies in the History of the People's Republic of China
- Cambridge Studies in the Theory of Democracy
- Cambridge Studies on Civil Rights and Civil Liberties
- Cambridge Studies on Environment, Energy and Natural Resources Governance
- Cambridge Studies on the American Constitution
- Cambridge Textbooks in Comparative Politics
- The China Quarterly Special Issues
- Commentaries on the 1949 Geneva Conventions
- Communication, Society and Politics
- Comparative Constitutional Law and Policy
- Contemporary European Politics
- Contemporary Political Theory
- Democratization and Authoritarianism in Post-Communist Societies
- Elements in American Politics
- Elements in Political Economy
- Elements in Politics and Society in Southeast Asia
- Elements in Public Policy
- Elements in Quantitative and Computational Methods for the Social Sciences
- European Inter-University Centre for Human Rights and Democratisation
- Feminist Judgment Series: Rewritten Judicial Opinions
- Global Burden of Armed Violence
- Global Economic Institutions
- The Hamlyn Lectures
- Hersch Lauterpacht Memorial Lectures
- Ideas in Context
- Integration through Law:The Role of Law and the Rule of Law in ASEAN Integration
- International Convention on the Settlement of Investment Disputes Reports
- International Council for Central and East European Studies
- International Law Reports
- International Organization
- Law in Context
- LSE International Studies
- LSE Monographs in International Studies
- Methodological Tools in the Social Sciences
- Methods for Social Inquiry
- Murphy Institute Studies in Political Economy
- Political Economy of Institutions and Decisions
- Problems of International Politics
- RAND Studies in Policy Analysis
- Reshaping Australian Institutions
- The Seeley Lectures
- Small Arms Survey
- South Asia in the Social Sciences
- Soviet Interview Project
- SSRC Anxieties of Democracy
- Strategies for Social Inquiry
- Studies on International Courts and Tribunals
- Themes in European Governance
- Themes in International Relations
- Theories of Institutional Design
- The Wiles Lectures
- The World Since 1980

== Psychiatry ==
10 results in Psychiatry

- Cambridge Child and Adolescent Psychiatry
- Clinical Topics in
- College Seminars Series
- European Network on Longitudinal Studies on Individual Development
- Psychiatry and Medicine
- Psychological Medicine Supplements
- Royal College of Psychiatrists
- Stahl's Essential Psychopharmacology Handbooks
- Stahl's Illustrated
- Studies in Social and Community Psychiatry

== Psychology ==
23 results in Psychology

- Advances in Personal Relationships
- Cambridge Child and Adolescent Psychiatry
- Cambridge Fundamentals of Neuroscience in Psychology
- Cambridge Handbooks in Psychology
- Cambridge Monographs and Texts in Applied Psycholinguistics
- Cambridge Series on Judgment and Decision Making
- Cambridge Social Neuroscience
- Cambridge Studies in Cognitive and Perceptual Development
- Cambridge Studies in Cognitive Linguistics
- Cambridge Studies in Public Opinion and Political Psychology
- Cambridge Studies in Social and Emotional Development
- Culture and Psychology
- Current Perspectives in Social and Behavioral Sciences
- Elements in Applied Social Psychology
- Elements in Psychology and Culture
- European Monographs in Social Psychology
- European Studies in Social Psychology
- Human Development in Cultural and Historical Contexts
- Interdisciplinary Approaches to Knowledge and Development
- The Jacobs Foundation Series on Adolescence
- Learning in Doing: Social, Cognitive and Computational Perspectives
- Pathways in Crime
- Studies in Emotion and Social Interaction

== Religion ==
35 results in Religion

- Cambridge Commentaries on Writings of the Jewish and Christian World
- Cambridge Companions to Religion
- The Cambridge Edition of Early Christian Writings
- Cambridge History of Christianity
- The Cambridge History of Islam
- Cambridge History of Jewish Philosophy
- Cambridge History of Religions in America
- The Cambridge History of the Bible
- Cambridge Library Collection - Religion
- Cambridge Library Collection - Science and Religion
- Cambridge Studies in Christian Doctrine
- Cambridge Studies in Islamic Civilization
- Cambridge Studies in Law and Judaism
- Cambridge Studies in Religion and Critical Thought
- Cambridge Studies in Religion, Philosophy, and Society
- Cambridge Studies in Religious Traditions
- Cambridge Studies in Social Theory, Religion and Politics
- Comprehensive Surveys of Religion
- Current Issues in Theology
- Elements in Religion and Violence
- Elements in the Philosophy of Religion
- The Heads of Religious Houses
- Introduction to Religion
- Methods in Biblical Interpretation
- New Cambridge Bible Commentary
- The New Cambridge History of Islam
- New Cambridge History of the Bible
- New Studies in Christian Ethics
- New Testament Theology
- Old Testament Theology
- Society for New Testament Studies Monograph Series
- Society for Old Testament Study Monographs
- Themes in Islamic History
- Themes in Islamic Law
- Understanding Jesus Today

== Sociology ==
22 results in Sociology

- Advances in Personal Relationships
- Afro-Latin America
- American Sociological Association Rose Monographs
- Cambridge Cultural Social Studies
- Cambridge Studies in Contentious Politics
- Cambridge Studies in Criminology
- Cambridge Studies in Social Theory, Religion and Politics
- Cambridge Studies in Society and the Life Sciences
- Cambridge Studies on Child and Adolescent Health
- Cambridge Textbooks in Comparative Politics
- Cambridge Texts in Modern Politics
- Comparative Ethnic and Race Relations
- Contemporary Japanese Society
- Contemporary Sociology
- Key Topics in Sociolinguistics
- Key Topics in Sociology
- Methods for Social Inquiry
- Pathways in Crime
- Strategies for Social Inquiry
- Structural Analysis in the Social Sciences
- Themes in International Urban History
- Themes in the Social Sciences

== Statistics and Probability ==
7 results in Statistics and Probability

- Cambridge Series in Statistical and Probabilistic Mathematics
- Institute of Mathematical Statistics Monographs
- Institute of Mathematical Statistics Textbooks
- International Series on Actuarial Science
- Practical Guides to Biostatistics and Epidemiology
- SemStat Elements
