= University of New South Wales Press =

Australian academic book publisher

The University of New South Wales Press Ltd. is an Australian academic book publishing company launched in 1962 and based in Randwick, a suburb of Sydney. The ACNC not-for-profit entity has three divisions: NewSouth Publishing (the publishing arm of the company), NewSouth Books (the sales, marketing and distribution part of the company), and the UNSW Bookshop, situated at the Kensington campus of the University of New South Wales, Sydney. The press is currently a member of the Association of University Presses.

== UNSW Press Board ==
The board of directors of University of New South Wales Press Ltd is appointed by the Council of the University of New South Wales.

Professor Merlin Crossley is Deputy Vice-Chancellor Academic, UNSW and the Chair of UNSW Press Ltd. Lynette Petrie is director of management reporting and analysis, in the Finance division of UNSW Sydney. George Williams AO is Deputy Vice-Chancellor, Planning and Assurance, Anthony Mason Professor and a Scientia Professor at UNSW. He has served as Dean of UNSW Law. He has written and edited 37 books, including eight books published by UNSW Press in its imprints. Fiona Inglis is the managing director of Curtis Brown Australia Pty Ltd, an Australian literary agency. Kathy Bail is the chief executive officer of UNSW Press. Former managing directors of UNSW Press Ltd include Robin Derricourt and Douglas Howie.

== NewSouth Publishing ==
NewSouth Publishing has the imprints NewSouth and UNSW Press and primarily engages in book publishing. Its executive publisher is Elspeth Menzies. Harriet McInerney is associate publisher. Each year it publishes around 50 general, literary and illustrated non-fiction books, and select scholarly works. Primary subjects covered include Australian history, Indigenous history, military history, art, architecture, design, biography, and popular science. UNSW Press is a member of the Association of University Presses.

Authors published under the UNSW Press and NewSouth imprints include Michelle Arrow, Alan Atkinson, Deborah Beck, Hilary Bell, Quentin Beresford, Catherine Bishop, John Blay, Frank Bowden, Rob Brooks, Bob Carr, Matthew Condon, Nicholas Cowdery, Sophie Cunningham, Mark Dapin, Paul Daley, Megan Davis, Andrew Dodd, Claire Duffy, Michael Duffy, James Dunk, Tom Dusevic, Tanya Evans, Delia Falconer, Vanessa Finney, Catherine Fox, Tom Frame, Kerryn Goldsworthy, Ian Hoskins, Jane R Goodall, Eleanor Gordon-Smith, Alice Gorman, Carolyn Holbrook, Paul Irish, Vivien Johnson, Darryl Jones, Ketan Joshi, Meredith Lake, Tess Lea, Geoffrey Lehmann, Peter Lewis, Jane Lydon, David J Mabberley, Jane McAdam, Joy McCann, Stuart Macintyre, Inger Mewburn, Patti Miller, Peter Monteath, Richard Neville (Mitchell Librarian, State Library of NSW), John Newton, Justine Nolan, Louis Nowra, Antonia Pesenti, John Pickrell, Henry Reynolds, Edward Scheer, Tim Soutphommasane, Mandy Sayer, Peter Stanley, Craig Stockings, Anne Summers, Peter Timms, Andrew Tink, Mark Tredinnick, Liz Tynan, Ian Tyrrell, Julienne Van Loon, Fred Watson, David Whish-Wilson, George Williams, Robyn Williams, Sally Young.

NewSouth Publishing was awarded Small Publisher of the Year at the Australian Book Industry Awards in 2016 and 2017.

Since 2010 its books have been published with the addition of a range of digital format options.

== NewSouth Books ==
NewSouth Books represents more than 80 publishers from Australia, Asia, the US, Canada, Europe and the UK including Magabala Books, Aboriginal Studies Press, Transit Lounge, Giramondo, Tuttle, Monash University Publishing, Sydney University Press, UWA Publishing, CSIRO Publishing, National Library of Australia, Princeton University Press, University of Minnesota Press, Bristol University Press/Policy Press, Manchester University Press, Sterling Publishing, Birlinn and Reaktion Books.

NewSouth Books' sales and marketing manager Jane Kembrey was awarded NSW Rep of the Year in 2015, as voted by Australian booksellers. NewSouth Books received Dymocks' Specialist Supplier of the Year award in 2018.

NewSouth Books is not connected with NewSouth Books, the independent publishing house founded in 2000 in Montgomery, Alabama.

== UNSW Bookshop ==
UNSW Press is one of the few book publishers or university presses in Australia that runs its own retail outlet. The company took over management of the campus bookstore from the Co-Op in 1997. UNSW Bookshop reopened after extensive renovations in 2019. It has been awarded Campus Bookseller of the Year in 2012, 2014, 2016 and 2017.
