= George Williams (lawyer) =

Australian legal scholar and commentator

George Williams AO FASSA
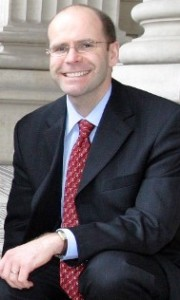
- Williams in 2005
- Born: George John Williams
- Occupations: Vice-Chancellor and President of Western Sydney University
- Spouse: Emma Williams
- Children: 2
- Awards: Australian Laureate Fellowship (2009)

Academic background
- Education: Macquarie University (BA, LLB); University of New South Wales (LLM); Australian National University (PhD)

Academic work
- Discipline: Lawyer
- Sub-discipline: Australian constitutional law
- Institutions: University of New South Wales; Western Sydney University

George John Williams is the Vice-Chancellor and President of Western Sydney University. He is an Australian academic specialising in Australian constitutional law and formerly held positions at the University of New South Wales including Deputy Vice-Chancellor of Planning and Assurance, Anthony Mason Professor of Law and Scientia Professor, Dean of the Law Faculty, and Australian Research Council Laureate Fellow. Williams is a public commentator on public law issues, and writes a regular column in the Sydney Morning Herald.

== Early life and education ==
Williams was born in Queenstown, a mining town in Tasmania, to father John Williams, an economic historian and unionist, and mother Shirley Murphy, an academic specialising in tax law at Macquarie University.

Williams' family moved to Sydney when he was a young child, and he attended St Ives High School.

Williams was educated at Macquarie University where he graduated with a Bachelor of Economics and a Bachelor of Laws with first-class Honours. He also holds a Master of Laws from the University of New South Wales and in 2000 he completed a Doctor of Philosophy in law from the Australian National University.

== Legal practice ==
Williams was admitted to practice as a legal practitioner in 1993. After graduating from university he served as an associate to Justice Michael McHugh in the High Court of Australia.

Williams then worked for a year as a solicitor at the law firm Blake Dawson Waldron (now Ashurst Australia), in Sydney.

In 2000, Williams was admitted to practice as a barrister in New South Wales. He has appeared in the High Court of Australia several times, although not in a speaking role.

Williams also appeared (led by Geoffrey Robertson) in Republic of Fiji v Prasad in the Supreme Court and Court of Appeal of Fiji, on the legality of the 2000 coup.

== Academic career ==
In 1995, Williams began his academic career as a lecturer at the Australian National University. He was appointed to Senior Lecturer in 1996. His first book was Australian Constitutional Law and Theory: Commentary and Materials, co-authored in 1996 with Tony Blackshield and Brian Fitzgerald, now in its seventh edition.

Williams was a visiting scholar at Columbia Law School in the Spring semester of 1999.

In 2000, Williams took up a position at the Faculty of Law at the University of New South Wales as Anthony Mason Professor of Law. In 2001, Williams helped found the Gilbert + Tobin Centre of Public Law at UNSW, and was its Foundation Director until 2008.

In 2008, Williams was a delegate in the governance stream at the Australia 2020 Summit. In 2005, he chaired the Victorian Human Rights Consultation Committee that led to the enactment of the Victorian Charter of Human Rights and Responsibilities.

On 13 June 2011, Williams was appointed an Officer of the Order of Australia for distinguished service to the law in the fields of anti-terrorism, human rights and constitutional law as an academic, author, adviser and public commentator.

In 2012, Williams said he would be "very interested" in being appointed as a judge of the High Court of Australia. News magazine Crikey reported that Williams had published a favourable opinion piece commending then Attorney-General Nicola Roxon, who would later that year need to recommend appointment of a new High Court judge. In 2013 he was elected a fellow of the Academy of the Social Sciences in Australia.

From October to December 2015, Williams was a Fellow at the Institute of Advanced Study at Durham University. He has also held visiting positions at Osgoode Hall Law School and University College London.

Williams was appointed Dean of the UNSW Faculty of Law in 2016. In 2020, he was appointed Deputy Vice-Chancellor (Planning & Assurance) at UNSW.

In July 2024 Williams commenced as Vice-Chancellor and President of Western Sydney University.

== Politics and views ==
=== Political affiliations ===
In 2006, Williams was elected head of the Australia Labor Party's legal and constitutional committee. In 2007, Williams unsuccessfully sought pre-selection as the Labor candidate for the Sydney electorate of Blaxland. In 2009, while on sabbatical from UNSW, Williams unsuccessfully sought pre-selection as the Labor candidate for the Canberra electorate of Fraser.

=== Policy and legal views ===
Williams has been a vocal critic of aspects of anti-terrorism legislation passed following the September 11 attacks, such as control order regimes.

Williams has been a proponent of a national statutory bill of rights.

== Family ==
Williams is married to Emma, a UNSW academic working in the field of corporate law. The couple have a son and a daughter.

== Published works ==
Williams has published extensively and his notable works include:

- Williams, George; Brennan, Sean; Lynch, Andrew (2014). Blackshield and Williams: Australian Constitutional Law and Theory: Commentary and Materials (6 ed.). The Federation Press. ISBN 978-186287-918-8.
- Williams, George (1998). Labour Law and the Constitution. Federation Press. ISBN 978-1-86287-308-7.
- Williams, George (1999). Human Rights under the Australian Constitution (1st pbk. ed.). Oxford University Press. ISBN 978-0-19-554111-3.
- Williams, George (1999). A Bill of Rights for Australia. UNSW Press. ISBN 978-0-86840-610-7.
