= Ringwood =

Ringwood may refer to:

== Places ==
=== Australia ===
- Ringwood, New South Wales, in Federation Council area
- Ringwood, Queensland
- Ringwood, Victoria, a suburb of Melbourne
  - Ringwood railway station, Melbourne

=== Canada ===
- Ringwood, Ontario, a hamlet in the town of Whitchurch-Stouffville

=== England ===
- Ringwood, Hampshire
  - Ringwood railway station

=== United States ===
- Ringwood, Illinois
- Ringwood, New Jersey, the most populous Ringwood in the US
- Ringwood, Oklahoma

== People ==
- Bob Ringwood (born 1946), British costume designer
- Gwen Pharis Ringwood (1910-1984), Canadian playwright
- Irene Ringwood Arnold (1895–1988), American college professor
- Michael T. Ringwood (born 1958), American leader of the LDS church
- Philip Ringwood (born 1953), English cricketer
- Ted Ringwood (1930-1993), Australian geologist

== Other ==
- Ringwood, the common name of Syzygium anisatum, an Australian rainforest tree
