= Temple of Artemis =

Ancient Greek temple in Ephesus (near present-day Selçuk, Turkey)

Coordinates: 37°56′59″N 27°21′50″E

- Ἀρτεμίσιον (Ancient Greek)
- Temple of Diana; Artemision
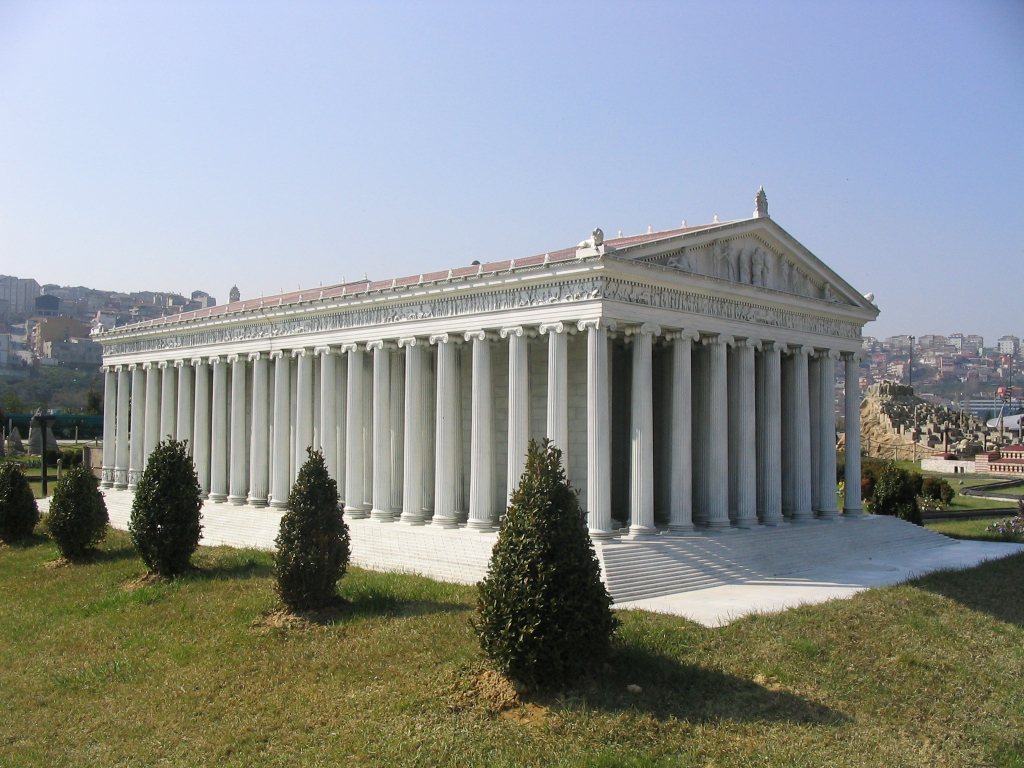
- A speculative model of the third Temple of Artemis at Miniatürk park in Istanbul
- Interactive map of Temple of Artemis
- Location: Ephesus, Asia Minor (near modern-day Selçuk, Izmir Province, Turkey)

History
- Abandoned: July 21, 356 BC (arson by Herostratus); 262 AD (plundered by the Goths); 401 AD (final destruction by a Christian mob)

Site notes
- Condition: Ruined; foundations and a single reconstructed column remain in situ. Sculptural elements are housed in the British Museum.

UNESCO World Heritage Site
- Criteria: iii, iv, vi
- Designated: 2015
- Part of: Ephesus
- Reference no.: 1018

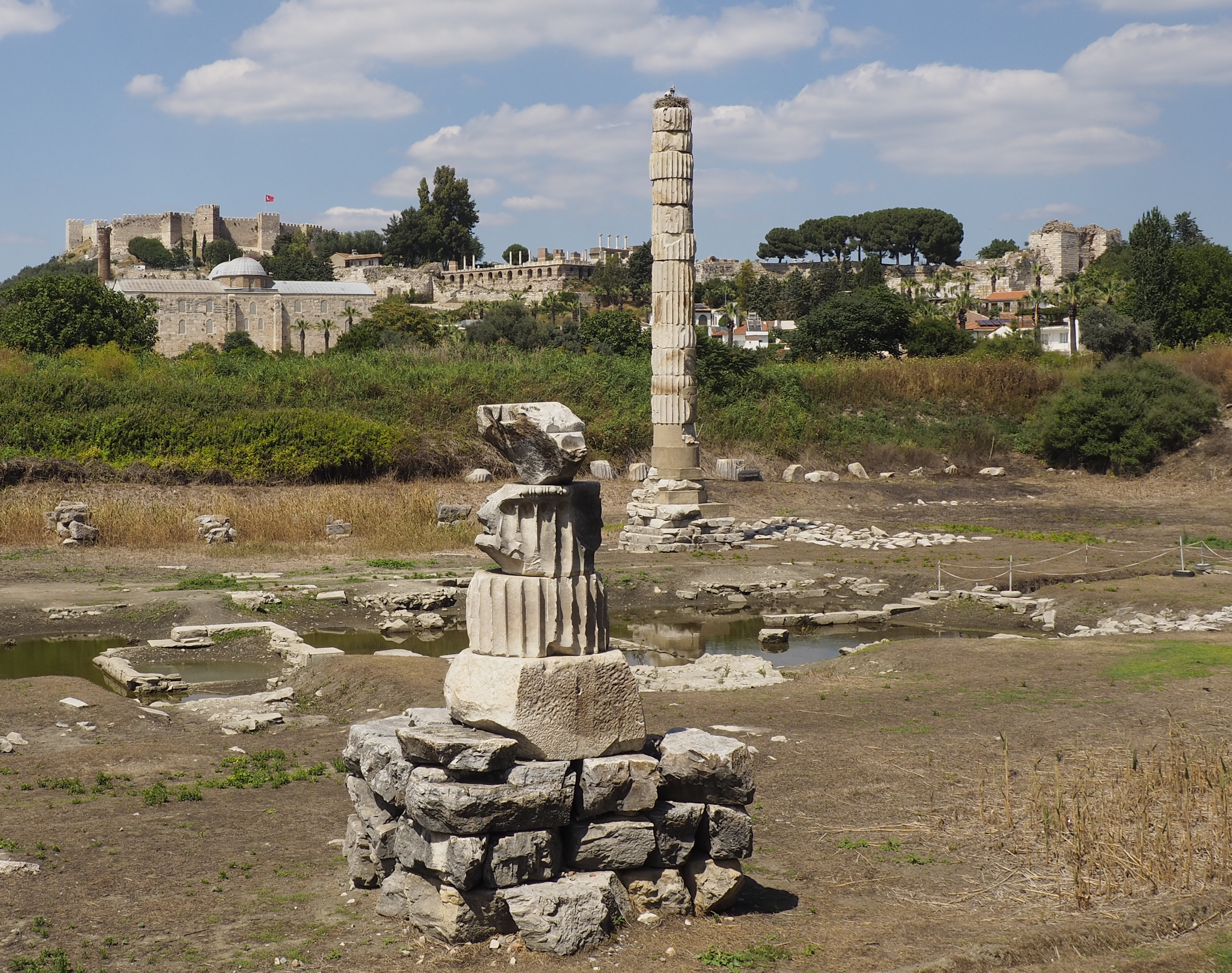
The site of the temple in 2017

Timeline and map of the Seven Wonders of the Ancient World, including the Temple of Artemis

The Temple of Artemis or Artemision, (Note: Greek: Ἀρτεμίσιον; Turkish: Artemis Tapınağı) also known as the Temple of Diana, was a Greek temple dedicated to a localised form of the goddess Artemis (equated with the Roman goddess Diana). It was located in Ephesus, near modern-day Selçuk in Turkey and is considered one of the Seven Wonders of the Ancient World. The temple was destroyed and rebuilt many times in antiquity; the last incarnation of the temple was destroyed in 262 AD, although Artemis continued to be worshipped at the site until around 401 AD. Only foundations and fragments of the last temple remain in the present day; some aspects of its appearance must be inferred by comparing archaeological evidence with ancient accounts.

The beginning of the history of the temple is unclear. It is known, however, that the earliest version of the temple was destroyed by a flood in the 7th century BC. A more elaborate reconstruction of the temple began around 550 BC under the leadership of the Greek architect from Crete Chersiphron, funded by Croesus of Lydia. This version of the temple lasted until 356 BC, when it was burned down by an arsonist, popularly identified as Herostratus.

The final form of the temple was funded by the people of Ephesus. The temple was central to Ephesian life, as it had great political and social value to its citizens. The Ephesian Artemis, which was considered as separate from the Hellenic version of the god, had unique features and artifacts associated with her and was seen as a protector of the city.

== Location and history ==
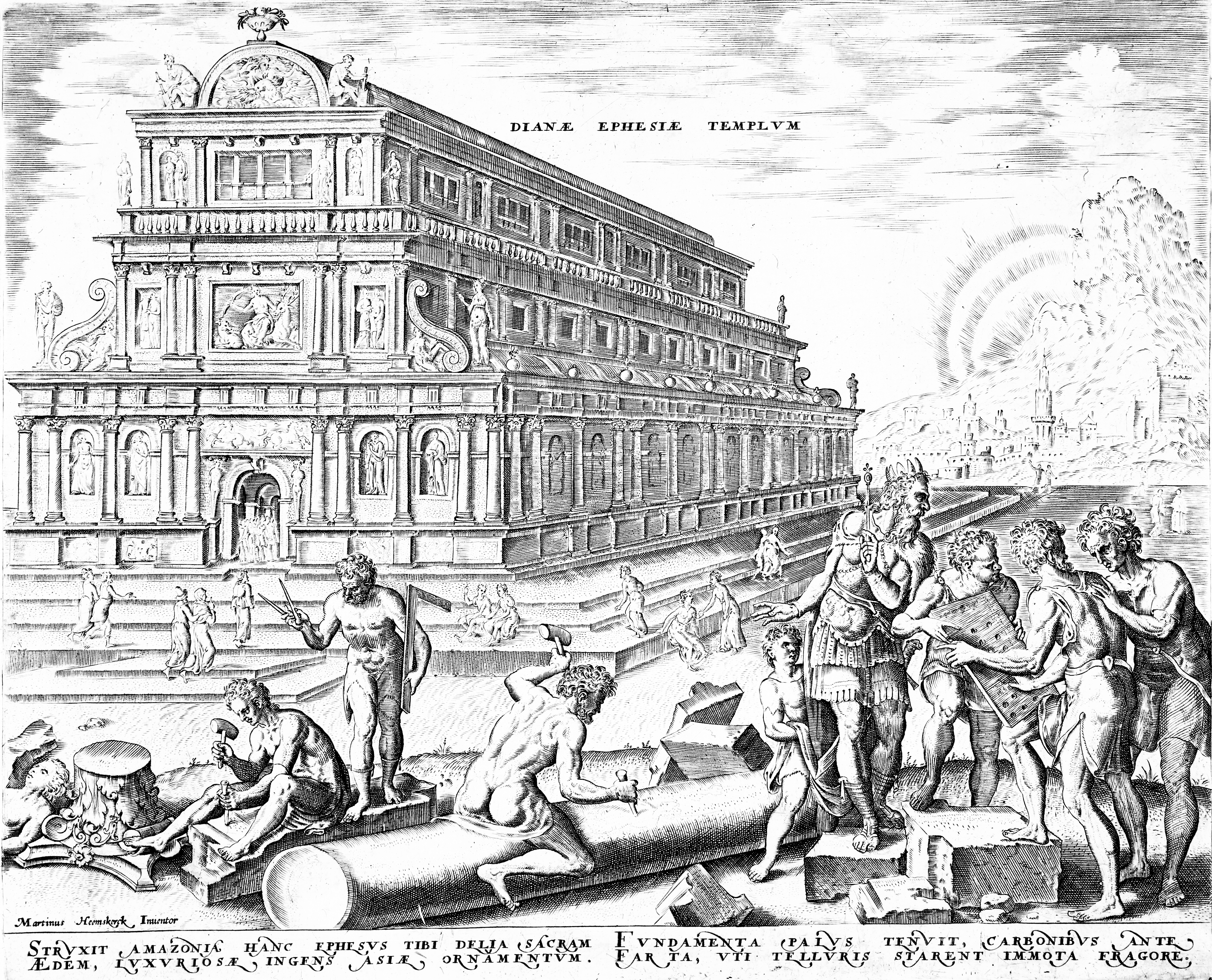
From the 1572 Octo Mundi Miracula, the earliest known representation of the temple in modern times. The engraving was by Martin Heemskerck.

The Temple of Artemis (artemisia) was located near the ancient city of Ephesus, about 75 kilometres (47 mi) south from the modern port city of İzmir, in Turkey. Today the site lies on the edge of the modern town of Selçuk.

The sacred site (temenos) at Ephesus was older than the Artemision itself. Pausanias was certain that it antedated the Ionic immigration by many years, being older even than the oracular shrine of Apollo at Didyma. He said that the pre-Ionic inhabitants of the city were Leleges and Lydians. Callimachus, in his Hymn to Artemis attributed the earliest temenos at Ephesus to the Amazons, legendary warrior-women whose religious practise he imagined already centered upon an image (bretas) of Artemis, their matron goddess. Pausanias believed that the temple pre-dated the Amazons.

Pausanias's estimation of the site's antiquity seems well-founded. Before World War I, site excavations by David George Hogarth seemed to identify three successive temple buildings. Re-excavations in 1987–1988 and re-appraisal of Hogarth's account (Note: Bammer (1990), pp. 137–160 offers a critical re-appraisal of Hogarth's methods, findings and conclusions.) confirmed that the site was occupied as early as the Bronze Age, with a sequence of pottery finds that extend forward to Middle Geometric times, when a peripteral temple with a floor of hard-packed clay was constructed in the second half of the 8th century BC. (Note: Bammer (1990), p. 142 noted some still earlier placements of stones, Mycenaean pottery and crude clay animal figurines, but warned "it is still to early to come to conclusions about a cult sequence.") The peripteral temple at Ephesus offers the earliest example of a peripteral type on the coast of Asia Minor, and perhaps the earliest Greek temple surrounded by colonnades anywhere.

In the 7th century BC, a flood destroyed the temple, depositing over half a meter of sand and flotsam over the original clay floor. Among the flood debris were the remains of a carved ivory plaque of a griffin and the Tree of Life, apparently North Syrian, and some drilled tear-shaped amber drops of elliptical cross-section. These probably once dressed a wooden effigy (xoanon) of the Lady of Ephesus, which must have been destroyed or recovered from the flood. Bammer notes that though the site was prone to flooding, and raised by silt deposits about two metres between the 8th and 6th centuries, and a further 2.4 m between the sixth and the fourth, its continued use "indicates that maintaining the identity of the actual location played an important role in the sacred organization".

== Second phase ==
The new temple was sponsored at least in part by Croesus, who founded Lydia's empire and was overlord of Ephesus. (Note: Herodotus' statement to this effect is confirmed by the conjectural reading of a fragmentary dedicatory inscription, conserved in the British Museum.) It was designed and constructed from around 550 BC by the Greek Cretan architect Chersiphron and his son Metagenes. It was 115 m (377 ft) long and 46 m (151 ft) wide, supposedly the first Greek temple built of marble. Its peripteral columns stood some 13 m (40 ft) high, in double rows that formed a wide ceremonial passage around the cella that housed the goddess's cult image. Thirty-six of these columns were, according to Pliny the Elder, decorated by carvings in relief. A new ebony or blackened grapewood cult statue was sculpted by Endoios, (Note: Pliny's source was the Roman Mucianus, who thought that the cult image by an "Endoios" was extremely ancient, however. Endoios' name appears in late 7th century Attic inscriptions, and Pausanias notes works attributed to him. Perhaps more importantly, the Ephesians of Mucianus' time maintained the tradition that the particular sculptor Endoios had created the remade image (LiDonnici 1992, p. 398).) and a naiskos to house it was erected east of the open-air altar.

=== Foundation deposit ===
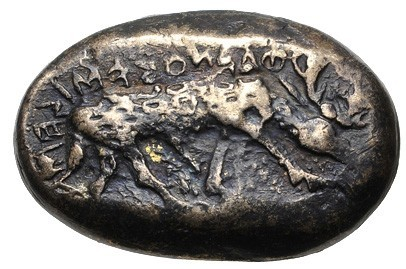
Electrotype of electrum coin from Ephesus, 625–600 BC. Stag grazing right, ΦΑΕΝΟΣ ΕΜΙ ΣΕΜΑ (retrograde, "I am the badge of Phaenos").

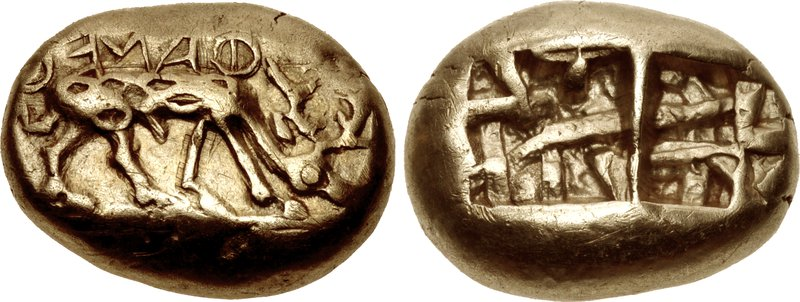
The earliest known inscribed coinage, from the foundation deposit of the Temple of Artemis: electrum coin of Phaneos from Ephesus, 625–600 BC. Obverse: Stag grazing right, ΦΑΝΕΟΣ (retrograde). Reverse: Two incuse punches, each with raised intersecting lines.

A rich foundation deposit from this era, also called the "Artemision deposit", yielded more than a thousand items, including what may be the earliest coins made from the silver-gold alloy electrum. The deposit contains some of the earliest inscribed coins, those of Phanes, dated to 625–600 BC from Ephesus, with the legend ΦΑΕΝΟΣ ΕΜΙ ΣΗΜΑ (or similar) ("I am the badge of Phanes"), or just bearing the name ΦΑΝΕΟΣ ("of Phanes").

Fragments of bas-relief on the lowest drums of the temple columns, preserved in the British Museum, show that the enriched columns of the later temple, of which a few survive (illustration below), were versions of this earlier feature. Pliny the Elder, seemingly unaware of the ancient continuity of the sacred site, claims that the new temple's architects chose to build it on marshy ground as a precaution against earthquakes, with lower foundation layers of fleeces and pounded charcoal.

The temple became an important attraction, visited by merchants, kings, and sightseers, many of whom paid homage to Artemis in the form of jewelry and various goods. It also offered sanctuary to those fleeing persecution or punishment, a tradition linked in myth to the Amazons who twice fled there seeking the goddess's protection from punishment, firstly by Dionysus and later, by Heracles. Diogenes Laertius claims that the misanthropic philosopher Heraclitus, thoroughly disapproving of civil life at Ephesus, played knucklebones in the temple with the boys, and later deposited his writings there.

=== Destruction ===
In 356 BC, the temple burned down. Various sources describe this as an act of arson by Herostratus, who set fire to the wooden roof-beams, seeking fame at any cost – thus the term herostratic fame. (Note: "A man was found to [have] plan[ned] the burning of the temple of Ephesian Diana so that through the destruction of this most beautiful building his name might be spread through the whole world.") For this outrage, the Ephesians sentenced the perpetrator to death and forbade anyone from mentioning his name, although Theopompus later noted it. Aristotle describes the temple's conflagration, but not its cause. In Greek and Roman historical tradition, the temple's destruction coincided with the birth of Alexander the Great (around 20–21 July 356 BC). Plutarch remarks that Artemis was too preoccupied with Alexander's delivery to save her burning temple.

Herostratus' part in the temple's destruction has been questioned in modern scholarship. Stefan Karweise notes that any arsonist would have needed access to the wooden roof framing; Knibbe (1998) writes of an "entire corps" of attested temple guards and custodians. The fire might even have been deliberately and covertly set by the temple's administrators, who were aware that the temple's foundation was sinking but were prevented from re-siting it elsewhere by religious constraints; Bammer has noted the conservation of the original sacred location throughout successive rebuildings, despite continued problems with flooding and foundations. Karwiese questions the motive of Herostratus since he only divulged his purpose under torture, which does not fit a man seeking fame. Knibbe (1998) considers Herostratus a "useful idiot in the service of the priesthood".

== Third phase ==
Alexander offered to pay for the temple's rebuilding; the Ephesians tactfully refused, saying "it would be improper for one god to build a temple to another", and eventually rebuilt it after his death, at their own expense. Work started in 323 BC and continued for many years. The third temple was larger than the second; 137 m (450 ft) long by 69 m (225 ft) wide and 18 m (60 ft) high, with more than 127 columns. Athenagoras of Athens names Endoeus, a pupil of Daedalus, as sculptor of Artemis' main cult image.

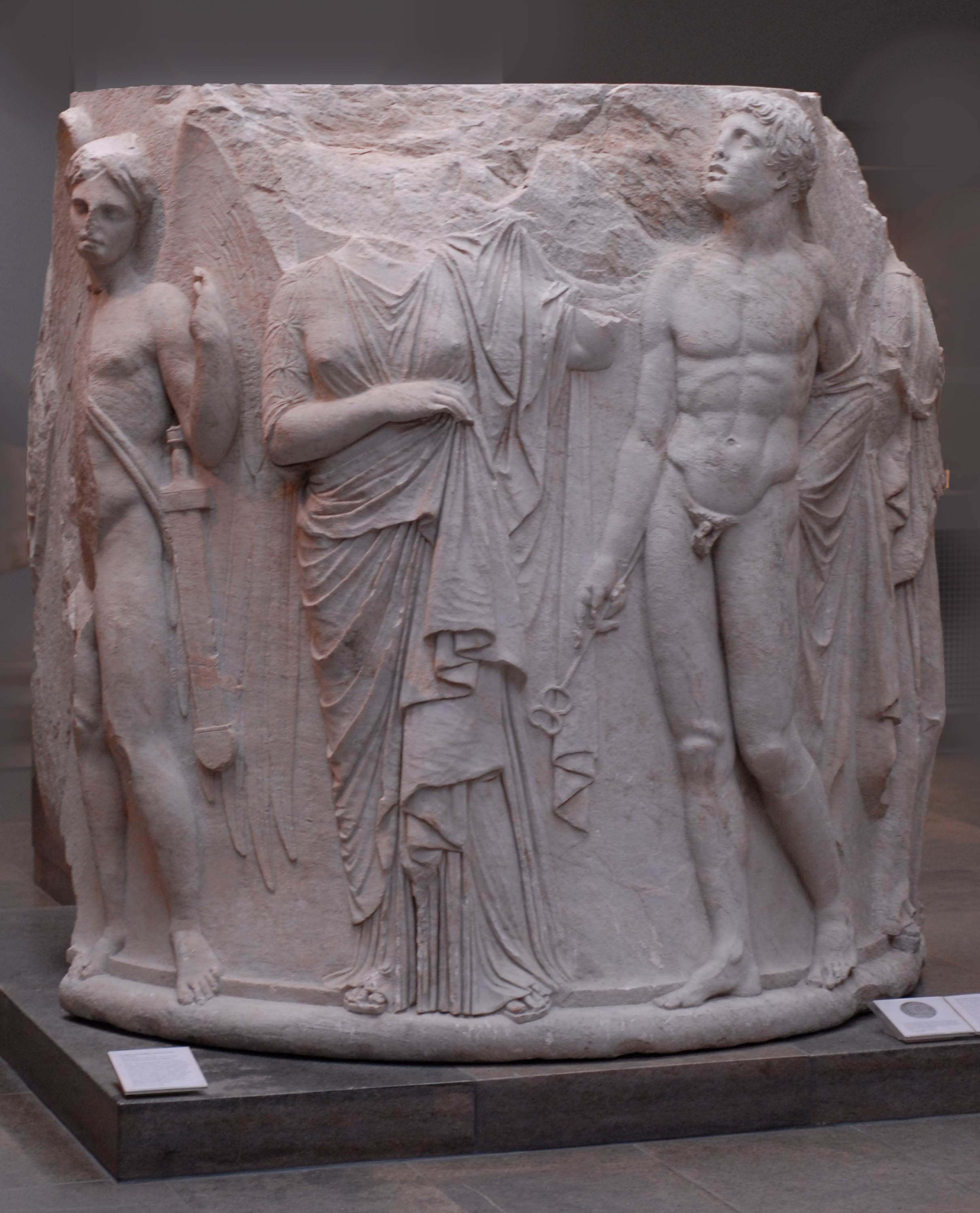
A drum from the base of a column from the 4th-century rebuilding, now in the British Museum

Pausanias (c. 2nd century AD) reports another image and altar in the temple, dedicated to Artemis Protothronia (Artemis "of the first seat") and a gallery of images above this altar, including an ancient figure of Nyx (the primordial goddess of Night) by the sculptor Rhoecus (6th century BC). Pliny describes images of Amazons, the legendary founders of Ephesus and Ephesian Artemis' original protégés, carved by Scopas. Literary sources describe the temple's adornment by paintings, columns gilded with gold and silver, and religious works of renowned Greek sculptors Polyclitus, Pheidias, Cresilas, and Phradmon.

=== Further claims of destruction ===
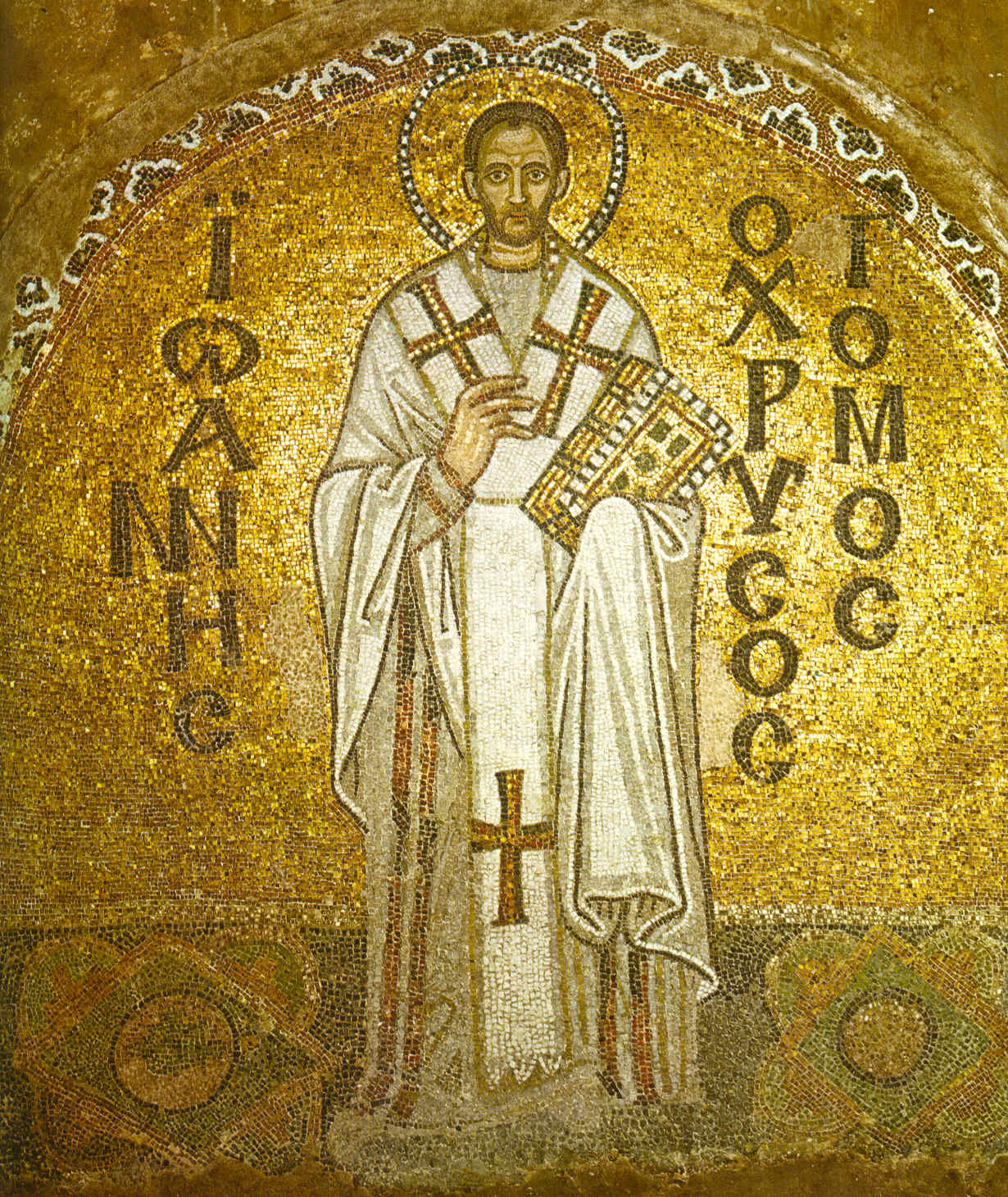
John Chrysostom, Archbishop of Constantinople, is thought by some to have ordered the temple's destruction in the 5th century

This reconstruction survived for 600 years and appears multiple times in early Christian accounts of Ephesus. The 2nd century Acts of John includes an apocryphal tale of the temple's destruction: The apostle John prayed publicly in the Temple of Artemis, exorcising its demons and "of a sudden the altar of Artemis split in many pieces ... and half the temple fell down," instantly converting the Ephesians, who wept, prayed, or took flight.

Against this, a Roman edict of 162 AD acknowledges the importance of Artemesion, the annual Ephesian festival to Artemis, and officially extended it from a few holy days over March–April to a whole month, "one of the largest and most magnificent religious festivals in Ephesus' liturgical calendar". (Note: The Roman edict of 162 AD was made as a form of official apology and compensation: A senior Roman official had unwittingly offended the goddess by conducting business during one or more of her holy days. The need for, and extent of, the edict shows that the political, economic, and religious importance of Ephesian Artemis was undiminished in 162, more than one hundred years after Paul's visit.)

In 268 AD, according to Jordanes, a raid by the Goths, under their leaders "Respa, Veduc, and Thurar", (Note: The names Respa, Veduco, and Thurar are otherwise unknown; see Wolfram (1988), p. 52 and note 84.) (Note: The date 268 CE is from Wolfram (1988) who correlates multiple sources to correct the date of the Gothic advance into the Aegean.) "laid waste many populous cities and set fire to the renowned temple of Diana at Ephesus." The extent and severity of the damage are unknown; the temple may have been repaired and open to use again, or it may have lain derelict until its official closure during the persecution of pagans in the late Roman Empire. There are signs that it may have been of use after 268, since Christian authors refers to its closure in the 5th-century. Ammonius of Alexandria comments on its closure, perhaps as early as 407 CE, or no later than the mid-5th century. After the city had been made Christian and the temple had been closed, the name of Artemis appears to have been erased from inscriptions throughout Ephesus.

Cyril of Alexandria credited Archbishop of Constantinople John Chrysostom with destroying the temple, referring to him as "the destroyer of the demons and overthrower of the temple of Diana". A later Archbishop of Constantinople, Proclus, noted the doings of John, saying "In Ephesus, he despoiled the art of Midas," but there is little evidence to support this claim.

At least some of the stone from the abandoned temple was used in construction of other buildings. A legend of the Late Middle Ages claims that some of the columns in the Hagia Sophia were taken from the Temple of Artemis at Ephesus, but there is no truth to this story.

The main primary sources for the Temple of Artemis at Ephesus are Pliny the Elder's Natural History,, writings by Pomponius Mela,and Plutarch's Life of Alexander. The final form of the temple is described in Antipater of Sidon's list of the world's Seven Wonders:

I have set eyes on the wall of lofty Babylon on which is a road for chariots, and the statue of Zeus by the Alpheus, and the hanging gardens, and the colossus of the Sun, and the huge labour of the high pyramids, and the vast tomb of Mausolus; but when I saw the house of Artemis that mounted to the clouds, those other marvels lost their brilliancy, and I said, "Lo, apart from Olympus, the Sun never looked on aught so grand".

== Rediscovery of the temple ==
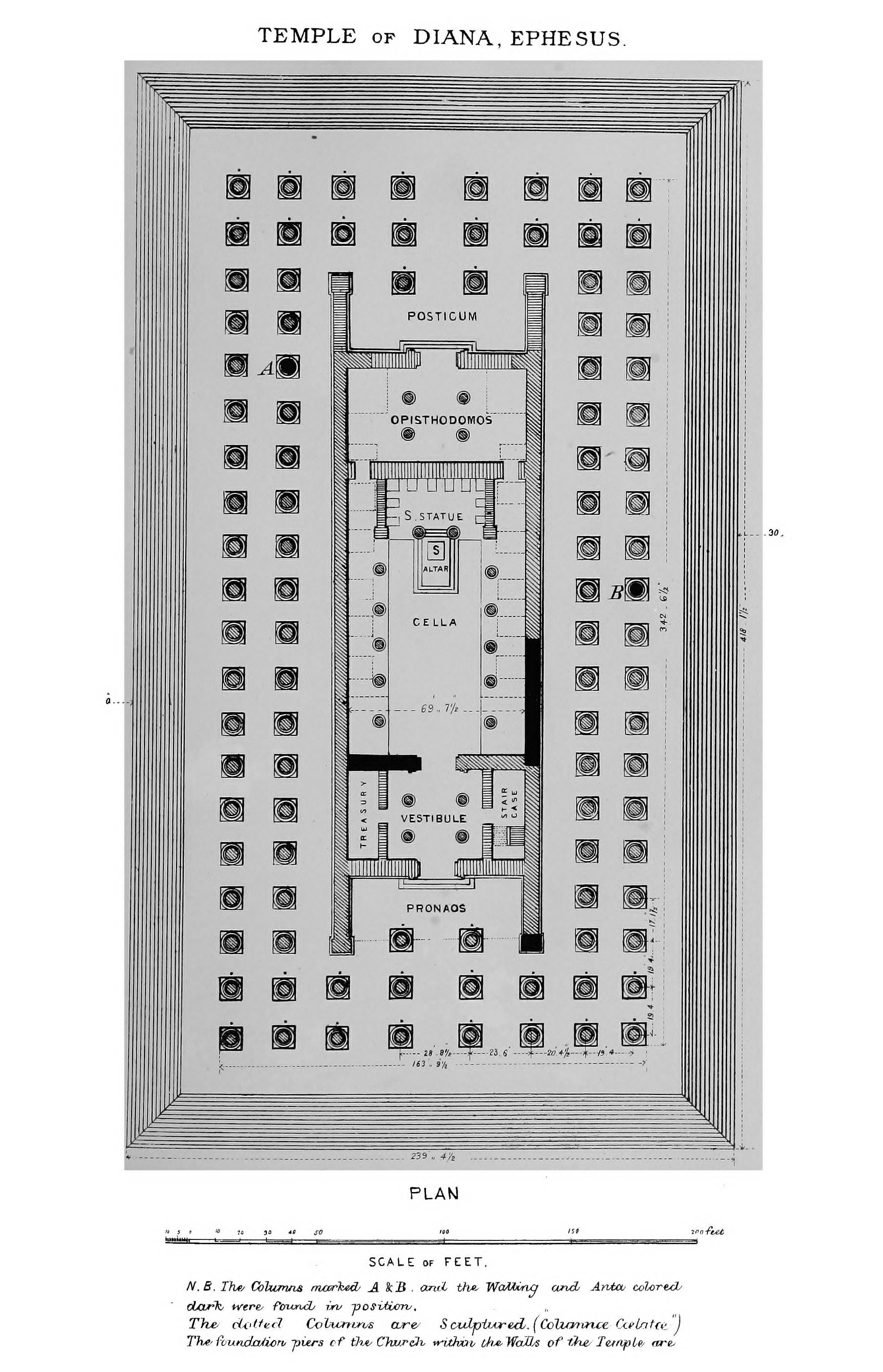
Reconstructive plan of Temple of Artemis at Ephesus according to John Turtle Wood (1877)

The site of the temple was rediscovered in 1869, after six years of searching by an expedition led by John Turtle Wood and sponsored by the British Museum. These excavations continued until 1874. As the temple was rediscovered, many artifacts were recovered along with it. Sculpted columns that were part of the temple depict different female religious figures, such as Artemis herself among the Amazons. A few further fragments of sculpture were found during the 1904–1906 excavations directed by David George Hogarth. The recovered sculptured fragments of the 4th-century rebuilding and a few from the earlier temple, which had been used in the rubble fill for the rebuilding, were assembled and displayed in the "Ephesus Room" of the British Museum. In addition, the museum has part of possibly the oldest cache of coins in the world (600 BC) that had been buried in the foundations of the Archaic temple.

Today the site of the temple, which lies just outside Selçuk, is marked by a single column constructed of miscellaneous fragments discovered at the site.

== Recent discoveries ==
In 2026, archaeologists investigating the Odeion within the Temple of Artemis documented a Middle Byzantine stone-lined grave containing the remains of two perinatal infants, possibly twins, buried inside a disused Roman latrine channel dating to the 2nd–3rd centuries AD. Radiocarbon dating placed the burial in the 8th–9th centuries CE, and bioarchaeological analysis indicated that the infants were likely born prematurely at approximately 33–34 weeks of gestation. The carefully constructed grave, the side-by-side placement of the infants, and evidence that they had been wrapped in a burial shroud suggest a deliberate Christian burial rather than the disposal of human remains. Researchers interpreted the unusual burial location as reflecting distinct funerary practices for unbaptized or perinatal children during the Middle Byzantine period.

== Cult and influence ==
The archaic temenos beneath the later temples clearly housed some form of "Great Goddess" but nothing is known of her cult. The literary accounts that describe it as "Amazonian" refer to the later founder-myths of Greek émigrés who developed the cult and temple of Artemis Ephesia. The wealth and splendor of temple and city were taken as evidence of Artemis Ephesia's power, and were the basis for her local and international prestige: despite the successive traumas of Temple destruction, each rebuilding – a gift and honor to the goddess – brought further prosperity. (Note: Stevenson (2001), p. 77 cites Aristides. For an exposition of the mechanisms involved in these social, religious, and economic advantages, see Stevenson (2001), pp. 70–80 ff.)The cult of Artemis was closely connected with the civic identity of Ephesus, and the sanctuary attracted worshippers from beyond the city. Large numbers of people came to Ephesus in March and in the beginning of May to attend the main Artemis Procession. The Temple of Artemis was staffed by a clergy, and the Goddess served by female priests with the title Melissonomoi.

Artemis' shrines, temples and festivals (Artemisia) could be found throughout the Greek world, but Ephesian Artemis was unique. The Ephesians considered her theirs, and resented any foreign claims to her protection. Once Persia ousted and replaced their Lydian overlord Croesus, the Ephesians played down his contribution to the temple's restoration. On the whole, the Persians dealt fairly with Ephesus, but removed some religious artifacts from Artemis' Temple to Sardis and brought Persian priests into her Ephesian cult; this was not forgiven. When Alexander conquered the Persians, his offer to finance the temple's second rebuilding was politely but firmly refused. (Note: The intended offering might have included a divine statue of Alexander himself, or simply an inscription commemorating his subsidy as a gift to the Goddess, with himself as her particular protege. The Ephesians protested with great diplomacy, it being "inappropriate for a god to dedicate offerings to a god".) Ephesian Artemis lent her city's diplomacy a powerful religious edge.

Under Hellenic rule, and later, under Roman rule, the Ephesian Artemisia festival was increasingly promoted as a key element in the pan-Hellenic festival circuit. It was part of a definitively Greek political and cultural identity, essential to the economic life of the region, and an excellent opportunity for young, unmarried Greeks of both sexes to seek out marriage partners. Games, contests and theatrical performances were held in the goddess's name, and Pliny describes her procession as a magnificent crowd-puller; it was shown in one of Apelles' best paintings, which depicted the goddess's image carried through the streets and surrounded by maidens. In the Roman Imperial era, the emperor Commodus lent his name to the festival games, and might have sponsored them.

== Ephesian Artemis ==
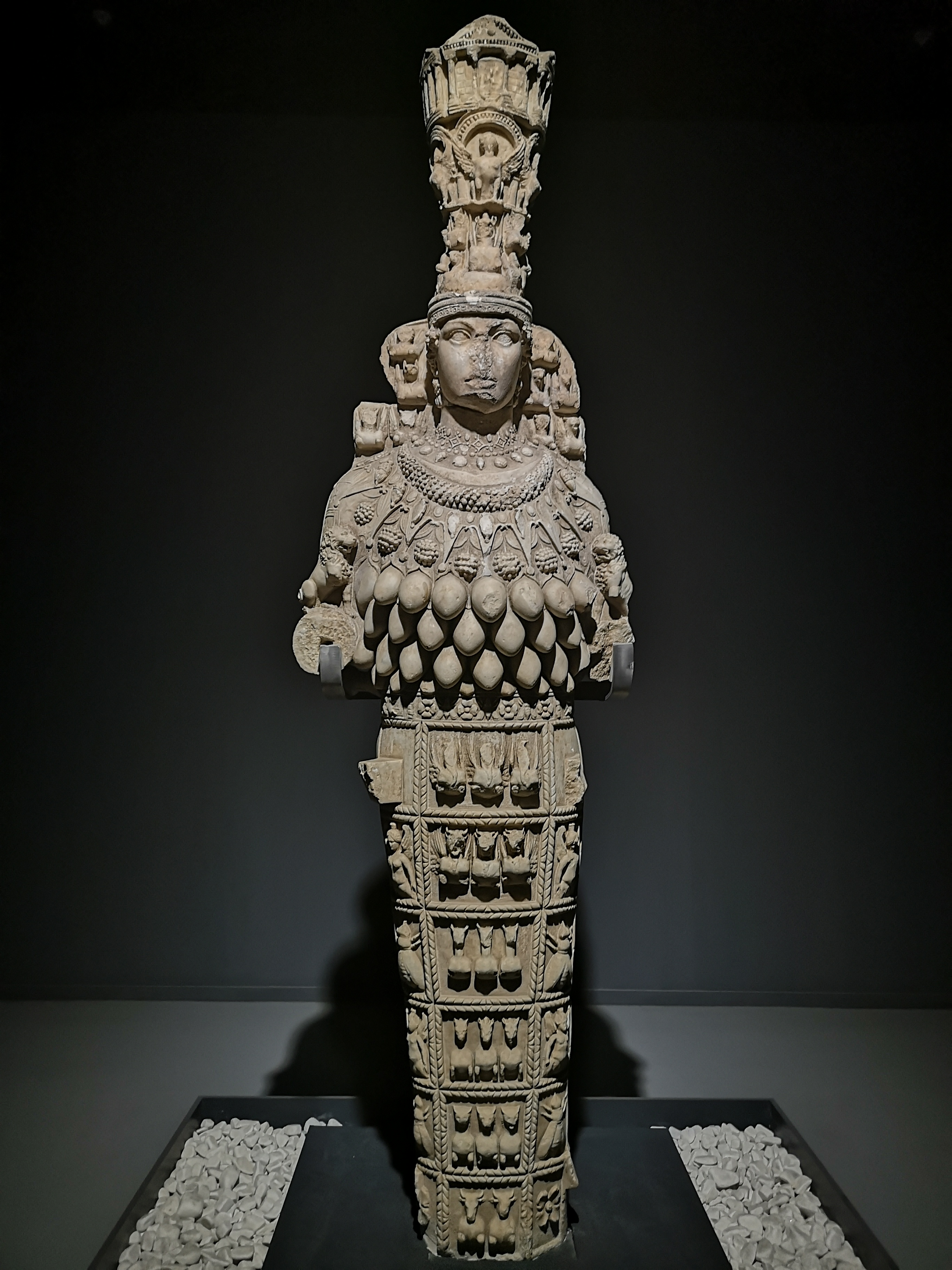
The Lady of Ephesus no. 712, 1st century AD, Ephesus Archaeological Museum

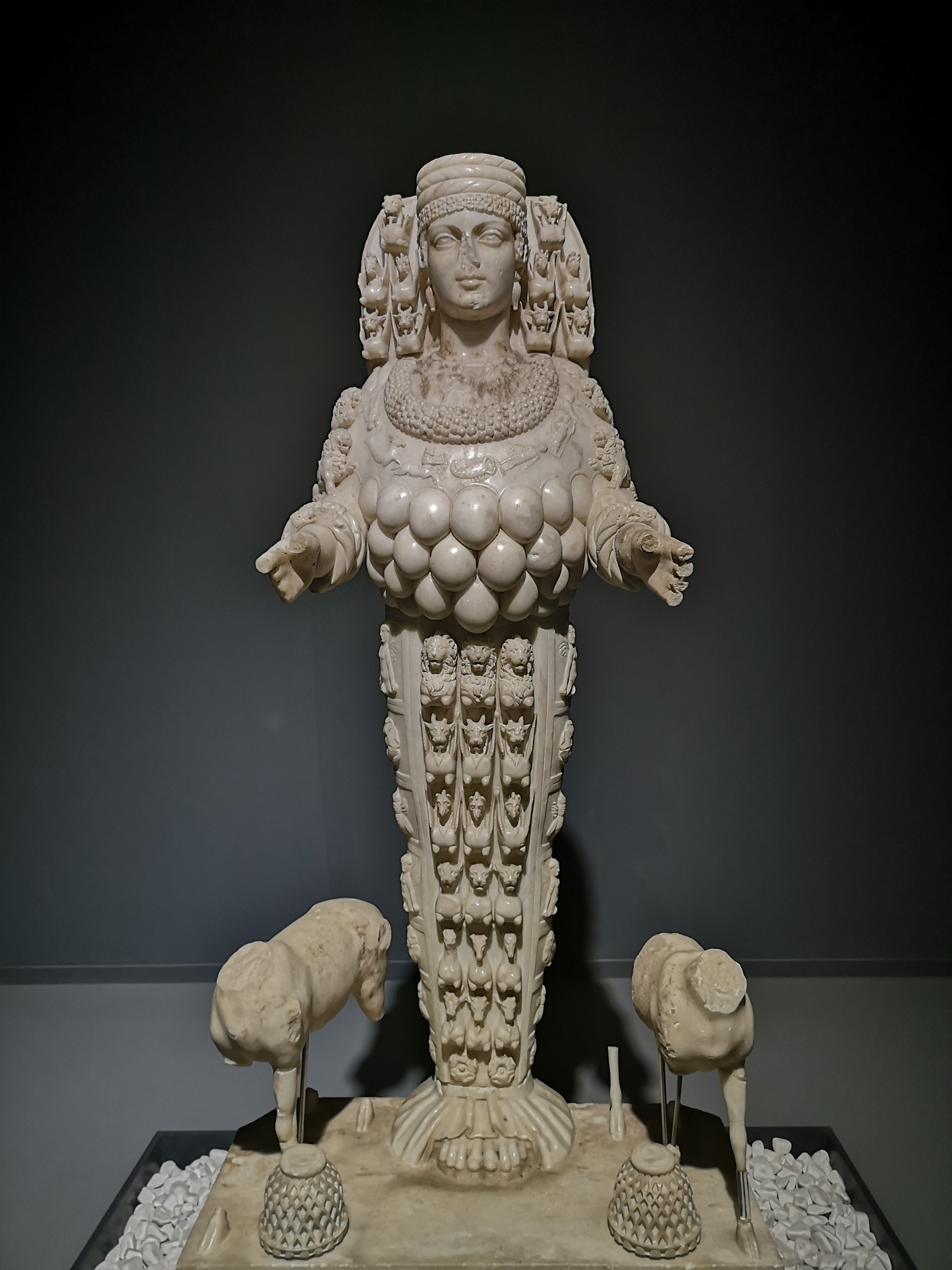
The Lady of Ephesus no. 718, 1st century AD, Ephesus Archaeological Museum

From the Greek point of view, the Ephesian Artemis is a distinctive form of their goddess Artemis. In Greek cult and myth, Artemis is the twin sister of Apollo, a virgin goddess of the hunt, the wilderness and the moon, who, despite being a goddess of childbirth was nevertheless known for her chastity. At Ephesus, the goddess whom the Greeks associated with Artemis was seen in an archaic, pre-Hellenic cult image. Pliny the Elder described a sculpture of Ephesian Artemis as being made of wood (a xoanon) and covered in gold and silver. This rendition of Artemis, however, has not survived due to the deteriorating nature of wood. In contrast, later depictions of her, rendered in bronze, have survived to this day.

The features are most similar to Near-Eastern and Egyptian deities, and least similar to Greek ones. The body and legs are enclosed within a tapering pillar-like term, from which the goddess' feet protrude. On the coins minted at Ephesus, the goddess wears a mural crown (like a city's walls), an attribute of Cybele as a protector of cities (see polos).

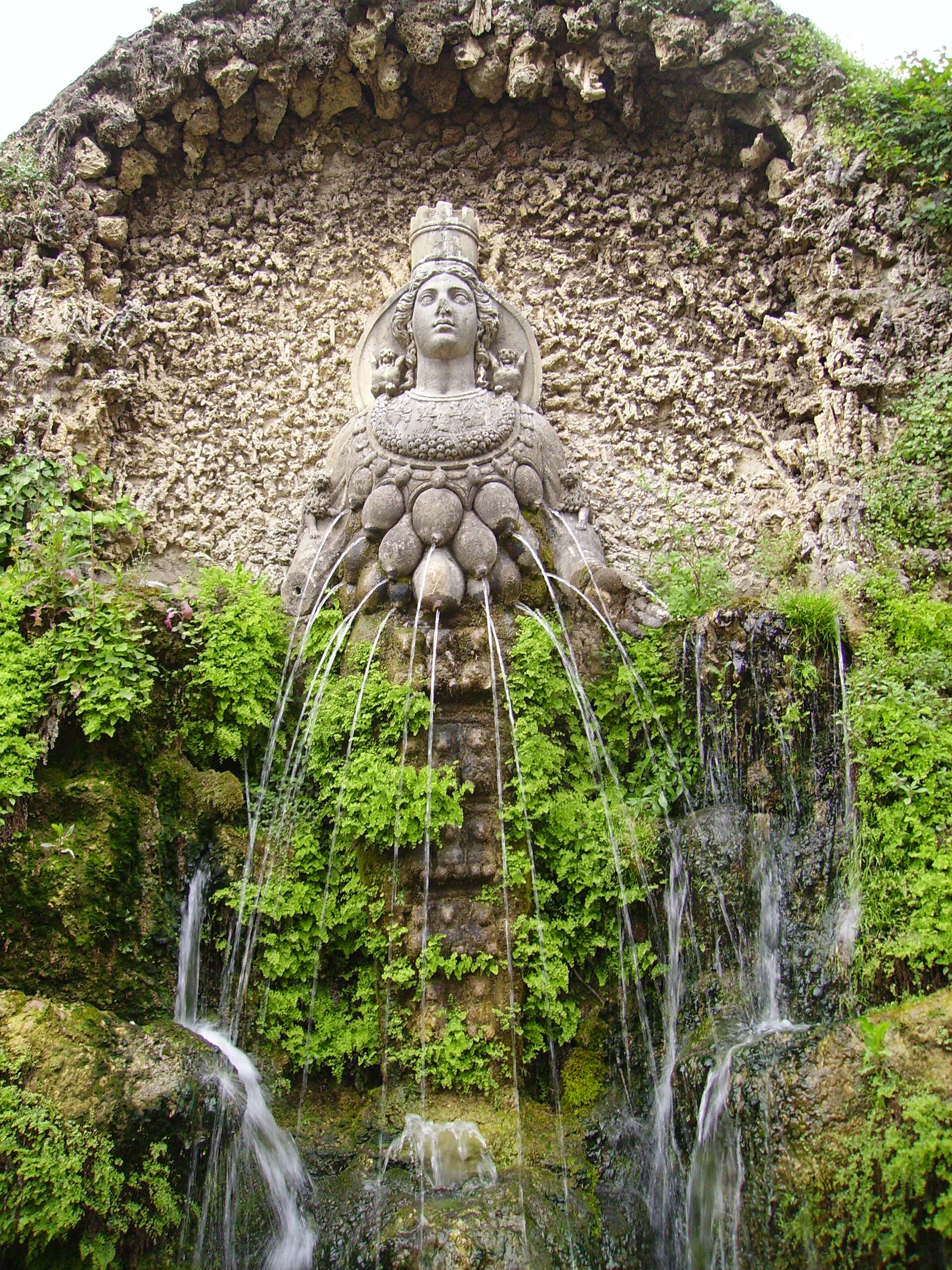
Traditional many-breasted interpretation in a 16th-century fountain of Diana Efesina, Villa d'Este, Tivoli, Italy

The traditional interpretation of the oval objects covering the upper part of the Ephesian Artemis is that they represent multiple breasts, symbolizing her fertility. This interpretation began in late antiquity and resulted in designations of the Ephesian goddess as Diana Efesia Multimammia and other related descriptions. This interpretation was rooted in Minucius Felix and Jerome's Christian attacks on pagan popular religion, and modern scholarship has cast doubt on the traditional interpretation that the statue depicts a many-breasted goddess.

Evidence suggests that the oval objects were not intended to depict part of the goddess' anatomy at all. In some versions of the statue, the goddess' skin has been painted black, likely to emulate the aged wood of the original, while her clothes and regalia, including the so-called "breasts", were left unpainted or cast in different colors.

Fleischer (1973) suggested that instead of breasts, the oval objects were decorations that would have been hung ceremonially on the original wood statue (possibly eggs, or the testicles of sacrificed bulls), and which were incorporated as carved features on later copies. The "breasts" of the Lady of Ephesus, it now appears, were likely based on amber gourd-shaped drops, elliptical in cross-section and drilled for hanging, that were rediscovered in the archaeological excavations of 1987–1988. These objects remained in place where the ancient wooden statue of the goddess had been caught by an 8th century flood. This form of jewelry, then, had already been developed by the Geometric Period.

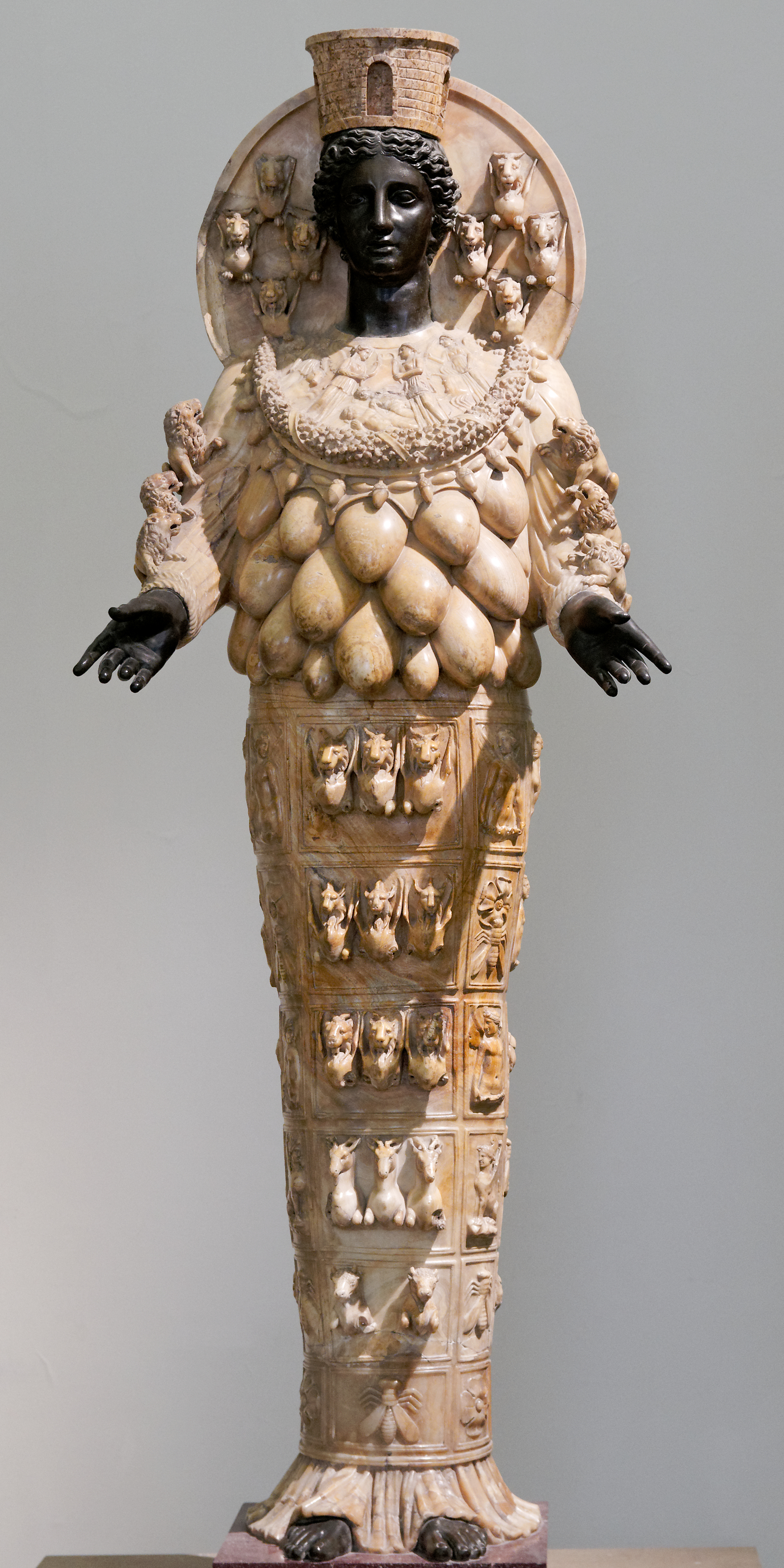
Farnese Artemis (2nd century) in the National Archaeological Museum, Naples

On the coins she rests either arm on a staff formed of entwined serpents or of a stack of ouroboroi – the eternal serpent with its tail in its mouth. In some accounts, the Lady of Ephesus was attended by eunuch priests called "Megabyzoi"; this might have been either a proper name or a title. The practice of ritual self-emasculation as qualification to serve a deity is usually identified with Cybele's eunuch mendicant priests, the Galli. The Megabyzoi of Ephesian Artemis were assisted by young, virgin girls (korai). (Note: Sometimes the existence of a college of priests of the Ephesian Artemis is disputed, and a succession of priests given the title of "Megabyzos" is preferred instead. They may have been few in number; their existence in any form is also disputed.)

A votive inscription mentioned by Bennett (1912), which dates probably from about the 3rd century BC, associates Ephesian Artemis with Crete:

"To the Healer of diseases, to Apollo, Giver of Light to mortals, Eutyches has set up in votive offering [a statue of] the Cretan Lady of Ephesus, the Light-Bearer."

The Greek habits of syncretism assimilated all foreign gods under some form of the Olympian pantheon familiar to them – the interpretatio graeca – and it is clear that at Ephesus, the identification with Artemis that the Ionian settlers made of the "Lady of Ephesus" was slender. Nevertheless, later Greeks and Romans identified her with both Artemis and Diana, and there was a tradition in ancient Rome that identified her with the goddess Isis as well.

The Christian approach was at variance with the syncretistic approach of pagans to gods who were not theirs. A Christian inscription at Ephesus suggests why so little remains at the site:

Destroying the delusive image of the demon Artemis, Demeas has erected this symbol of Truth, the God that drives away idols, and the Cross of priests, deathless and victorious sign of Christ.

The assertion that the Ephesians thought that their cult image had fallen from the sky, though it was a familiar origin-myth at other sites, is only known for the temple at Ephesus from Acts 19:35:

After the city secretary quieted the crowd, he said, “Men of Ephesus, what person is there who does not know that the city of the Ephesians is the keeper of the temple of the great Artemis and of her image that fell from heaven?"

Lynn LiDonnici observes that modern scholars are likely to be more concerned with origins of the Lady of Ephesus and her iconology than her adherents were at any point in time, and are prone to creating a synthetic account of the Lady of Ephesus by drawing together documentation that ranges over more than a millennium in its origins, creating a falsified, unitary picture, as of an unchanging icon.

== Panorama ==
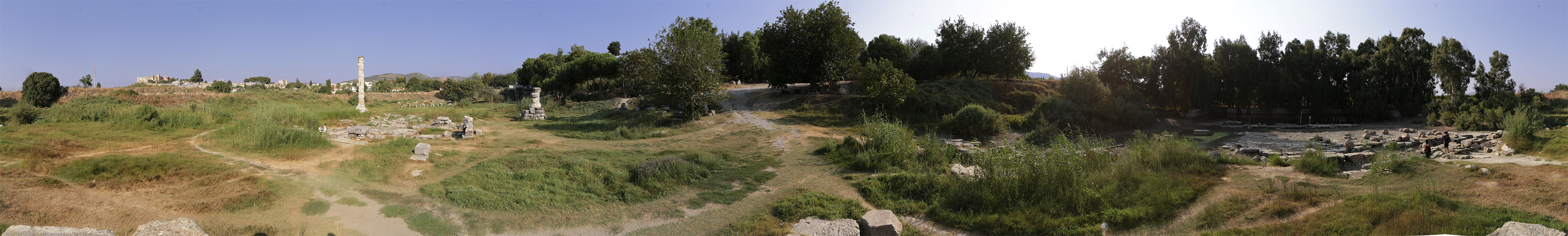
A 360 degree panoramic view of the site of the temple

== See also ==
- List of Ancient Greek temples
- Riot of the Ephesian silversmiths

== Sources ==
- Arnold, Irene Ringwood (1972). "Festivals of Ephesus". American Journal of Archaeology. 77 (1): 17–22. doi:10.2307/503607. JSTOR 503607. S2CID 191403956.
- Bammer, Anton (1990). "A Peripteros of the geometric period in the Artemision of Ephesus". Anatolian Studies. 40: 137–160. doi:10.2307/3642799. JSTOR 3642799. S2CID 164151382.
- LiDonnici, Lynn R. (1992). "The images of Artemis Ephesia and Greco-Roman worship: A reconsideration". Harvard Theological Review. 85 (4): 389–415. doi:10.1017/S0017816000008208. JSTOR 1510059. S2CID 154679084.
- Rogers, Guy MacLean (2012). The Mysteries of Artemis of Ephesos: Cult, Polis, and Change in the Graeco-Roman World. New Haven and London: Yale University Press. ISBN 9780300178630.
