= Herostratus =

Arsonist who destroyed the Temple of Artemis (fl. 356 BCE)

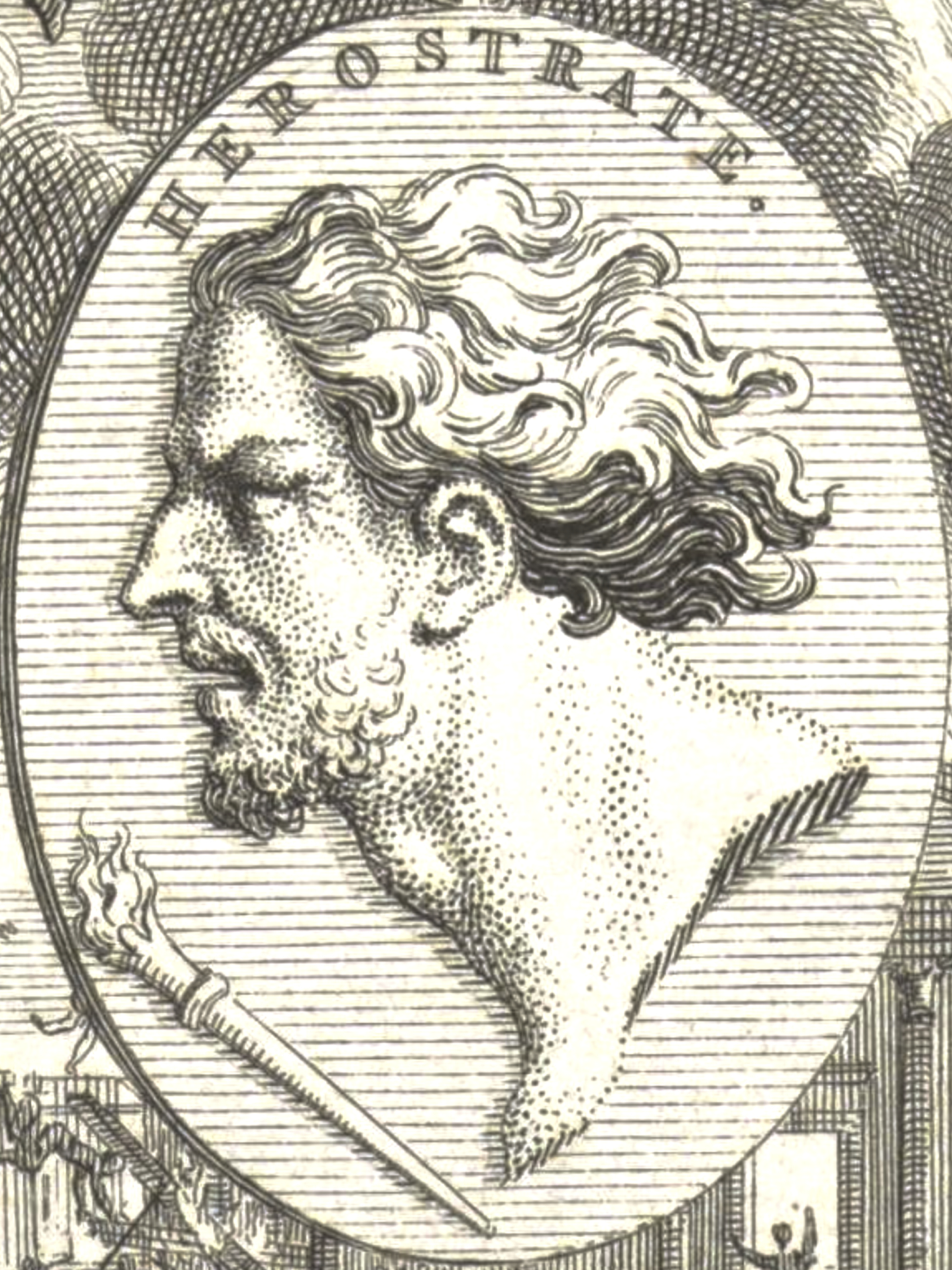
Posthumous portrait, c. 1683–1733

Herostratus, or Eratostratus (fl. 356 BCE), (Note: His Ancient Greek name is Ἡρόστρατος, transliterated as Herostratos. This, in English, translates into army-hero or army devoted to Hera.) was an arsonist who destroyed the Temple of Artemis in an attempt to achieve infamy. His name has become an eponym for someone who commits a crime solely to become famous.

Herostratus's life and background are almost entirely unknown. In 356 BCE, he burned down the Temple of Artemis at Ephesus, one of the Seven Wonders of the Ancient World. He was swiftly arrested and made to confess his intentions—to gain everlasting fame—under torture, and was thereafter executed. The arson prompted a damnatio memoriae law barring mention of his name, although many ancient writers, even one contemporary of the arson, documented him. While Herostratus is thought to have been spurred on by resentment at what he saw as societal injustice, his exact motives are not known with any certainty. Modern scholars argue that his crime prefigured modern terrorist acts, including the assassination of Empress Elisabeth of Austria and the September 11 attacks.

His life and crime have been adapted and discussed extensively in Western literature since the Middle Ages. Works from the likes of Alessandro Verri to Jean-Paul Sartre repurpose him into a fictional character, sometimes in the context of a modern world.

== Life ==
Few details about Herostratus survive, and nothing whatsoever of his family, birthdate, residence, job, or place in society is known. In historian Albert Borowitz's words, his identity "is shrouded in mystery except for the name that history attributes to him". (Note: Another subject of uncertainty is Herostratus' name, in that scholars are not sure whether that name was his by birth or later bestowed on him. However, Herostratus was not atypical in ancient Greece.) It is sometimes assumed he was a citizen of the city Ephesus, near modern Selçuk, Turkey, but this remains uncertain. Alternatively, because his punishment usually only applied to noncitizens, some historians have suggested that Herostratus was non-Ephesian by birth or a slave (or former slave). (Note: Borowitz notes another possible solution to the punishment conundrum: the Ephesians, aghast at Herostratus's grand act, suspended laws safeguarding citizens against torture.) Some suppose he belonged to a low social standing.

== Burning the Temple ==
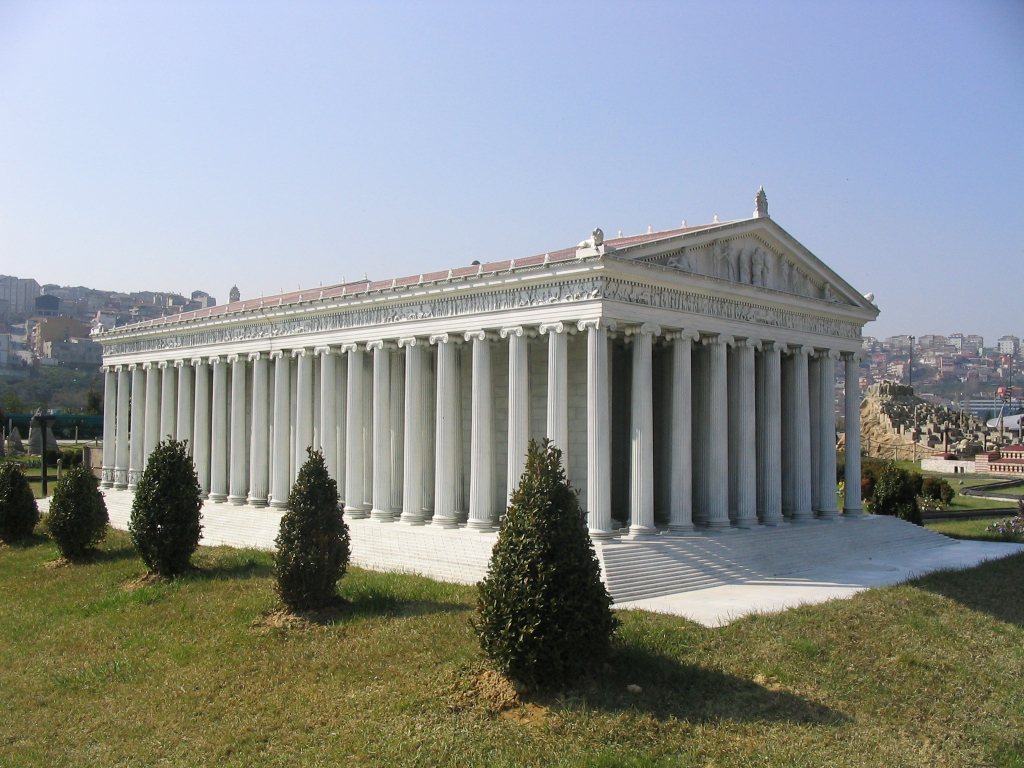
A modern model of the Temple of Artemis at Miniatürk, Istanbul, Turkey

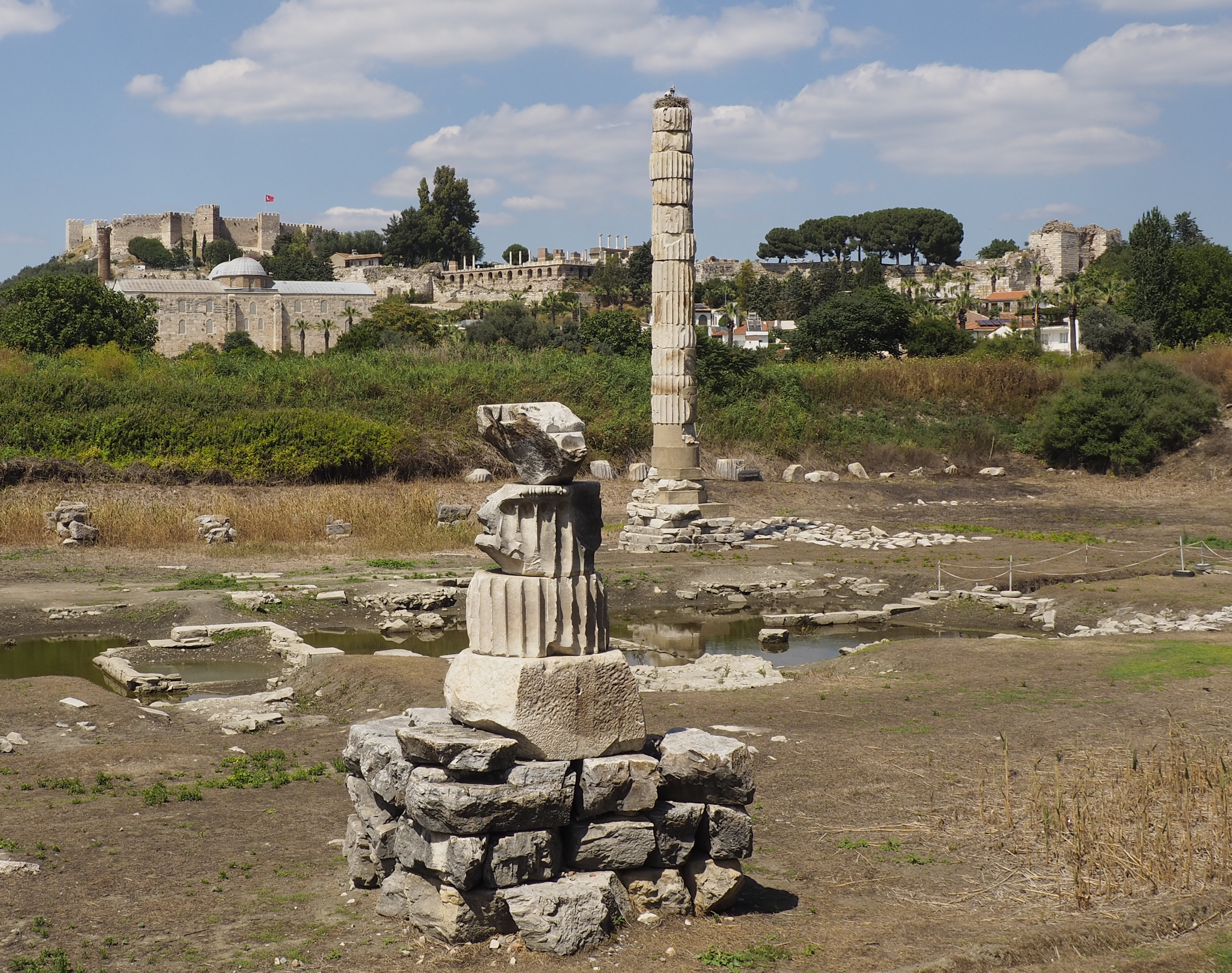
The temple site in 2017

The Temple of Artemis at Ephesus was dedicated to the Greek goddess of childbirth and the hunt. Born of competition between the city and its rival Samos, it was designed by Chersiphron and Metagenes (Note: According to the historian Mark Cartwright, Chersiphron and Metagenes could have lived in the eighth century BCE and were therefore involved in the construction of a prior version of the temple.) and built over 120 years starting around 560 BCE. Pliny the Elder estimated that it surpassed the Parthenon in size by twofold. Nearly all of it was made of marble, save for such parts as the wooden statue of Artemis and the roof. Ancient sources listed the temple as one of the Seven Wonders of the World; Philo of Byzantium and Pliny crowned it "the only house of the gods" and "the most wonderful monument of Græcian magnificence", respectively.

On the day Alexander the Great was born in 356 BCE, (Note: Sources disagree on Alexander the Great's birth date: July 20, 21, and 26 have been proposed. Ancient tradition stresses the simultaneity of the arson and Alexander's birth; Greek historian Timaeus commented that "the burning of the temple of Diana of Ephesus on the night on which Alexander was born … need cause no surprise, since Diana was away from home, wishing to be present when Olympias [Alexander’s mother] was brought to bed.") a man burned the temple down; some historians claim he set its large wooden roof ablaze. The crime was attributed to an unknown man named Herostratus. Promptly arrested, he was tortured on the rack, where he confessed to having committed the arson to secure everlasting fame or notoriety. (Note: Borowitz writes: "Herostratos and his followers share a desire for fame or notoriety as long lasting and widespread as can be achieved.") He was then executed. To thwart his ambition and harden his punishment, Ephesus passed a damnatio memoriae law forbidding anyone from mentioning his name. The arson shocked and grieved the city and possibly pushed it to the brink of panic.

According to Borowitz, there may be gaps in this account. One possible gap is Herostratus's professing his vainglorious motives under torture instead of "[crying] his name ... to all who would listen"; torture was often not considered a means of obtaining information. Also, Ephesians may have suspected that Herostratus's true intention remained concealed, for instance, in the event that enemies of the city had hired him to wreck the temple. Historian Dieter Knibbe, skeptical of Herostratus's role, notes that a band of guards and custodians were routinely present on site. He proposes that the temple's overseers may have committed the arson instead: knowing that its foundation was sinking, they had to burn the temple down in secret because popular beliefs kept them from moving it elsewhere.

Starting in 323 BCE, the temple was rebuilt, and the resulting structure was larger than before. The Goths looted and burned it around 262/267 CE, and the temple met its end in 401 CE at the hands of a Christian mob. As of 2017, a sole reassembled column stayed standing.

No piece of evidence reveals Herostratus's motives. While ancient sources agree that he burned the temple to amass eternal or ubiquitous fame, they do not definitively conclude why he sought this fame. The leading theory since antiquity suggests he grew resentful at some perceived injustice and could not attain a good reputation, which thrust him toward the act. Greek satirist Lucian proposed for the first time that jealousy or a feeling of mediocrity motivated Herostratus, in that fame would only arrive by burning the Artemision and by no other means: a perversion, says Borowitz, of the Greek world's admiration of honor, bravery, and heroism. In the view of Russian poet Semyon Nadson, Herostratus had acknowledged that he was a "maggot squashed by destiny, in the midst of the countless hordes". On the other hand, the Roman authors Aelian and Valerius Maximus both surmised that he was drawn towards sacrilege. To them, Herostratus released his anger on the temple itself, a religious symbol, and not the Ephesian public.

== Transmission and historical interpretation ==
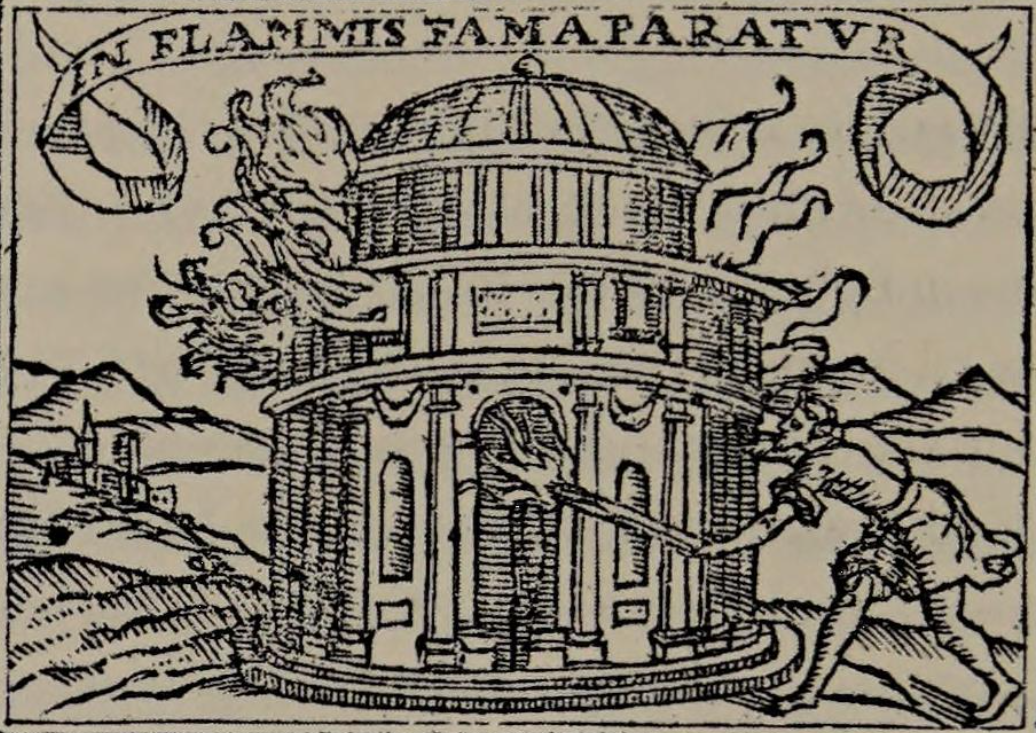
Herostratus burning the Temple of Artemis by Sebastián de Covarrubias; the banderole contains a Latin motto translating into fame is prepared in flames.

The damnatio memoriae law did not stop numerous ancient writers from documenting Herostratus. If anything, the law may have guaranteed him posthumous fame, argues cultural writer Matthew Fraser. The first to mention him was Theopompus, a Chian historian and contemporary of the arson; he does so in the Philippica. In a segment titled "Of Appetite for Glory", Valerius Maximus brings up Herostratus's case to demonstrate criminal quests for fame alongside that of Pausanias, the assassin of Philip II of Macedon. His essay was the first to juxtapose Herostratus with a criminal hunt for fame. Around the second century CE, Lucian named the arson in relation with a later violent act: Peregrinus' self-immolation at the Olympics.

By the Middle Ages, Herostratus was a familiar name in Europe. Writers such as Geoffrey Chaucer generally mentioned him to mark unscrupulous quests for celebrity and stress that fame for wrongdoing often outlives deserved glory. Invoking the arsonist, the protagonist of Juan Ruiz de Alarcón's 1630 comedy La verdad sospechosa (The Suspicious Truth) reasons that a low public profile makes a person an "animal" and that one must seek out fame by any means necessary. In his 1699 play Richard III, Colley Cibber paints the English king as fame-thirsty and eager to define himself through unusual methods, and thus he recalls Herostratus's story: "Th'aspiring Youth, that fir'd the Ephesian dome, / Outlives, in Fame, the pious Fool that rais'd it." (Note: Thomas Browne, in Urn Burial (1658), similarly reflects on the indiscriminate nature of posthumous fame, seeing that the man who destroyed the Temple of Artemis, Herostratus, is remembered, while the architect, Chersiphron, is nearly forgotten.) Beyond literature, an oral tradition revolving around him arose.

Starting from the Renaissance, Herostratus was a common metonym for someone accused of ruthlessness. Satirist Gabriel Harvey wrote in the late sixteenth century a letter against another author, Robert Greene, in which he likened Greene's written attacks on his family to the burning of the Artemision. Thomas Jefferson was also called Herostratic. When he fantasized about grand salt deposits on the Missouri River Louisiana Purchase, one United States Gazette writer interpreted it as a dream of glory similar to Herostratus's.

Nineteenth-century literature, writes Borowitz, commenced "the still ongoing process of converting Herostratos from a symbol of destructiveness into a richly imagined personage". Differing from ancient sources, some modern authors supply their account of Herostratus's arson with a background and context. While most rebuke his crime, some indirectly romanticize or abate it by stressing that he was little known and dejected. Enlightenment writer Alessandro Verri published the first book-length fiction on Herostratus in 1815, La Vita di Erostrato (The Life of Herostratus). It tells the tale of a man seeking glory who, after constantly having his dreams shattered in failure, grows frustrated and burns the Temple of Artemis. On the other hand, Romantic and exoticist poetry tended to focus on Herostratus's supposed "joy in destruction or self-destruction" over his hunger for fame.

Herostratus's name has persisted in the twentieth and twenty-first centuries. Jean-Paul Sartre's short story "Erostratus" concerns Paul Hilbert, who aspires to become a "black hero" in the vein of Herostratus but fails due to personal weakness. The 1967 film Herostratus, a critique of a society drenched in advertising that exploits youth, molds the historical figure and event into a fictional address to 1960s society. Before the forlorn protagonist intends to kill himself, he arranges to make his suicide a media spectacle until a change of mind befalls him. A recent adaptation, Philipe Arnauld's 2002 La boite à chagrins (Pandora's Box), introduces mass media and the internet, as a serial killer who goes by Herostratus plans to publish images of his murders on the internet; a detective traps him. In another, Sam Levinson's 2018 satirical film Assassination Nation, a hacker under the handle Er0str4tus leaks half of Salem's personal information "for the lulz", sending the town into a frenzy of violence and insanity.

== Analysis and social legacy ==
Herostratus's name has become a term for someone who commits a crime to achieve notoriety or self-glorification, and Herostratic fame refers to "fame [sought] at any cost". According to writer Julia H. Fawcett, he "exemplifies a figure asserting his right to self-definition, one who strikes out against a history to which he is unknown by performing himself back into that history—through whatever means necessary".

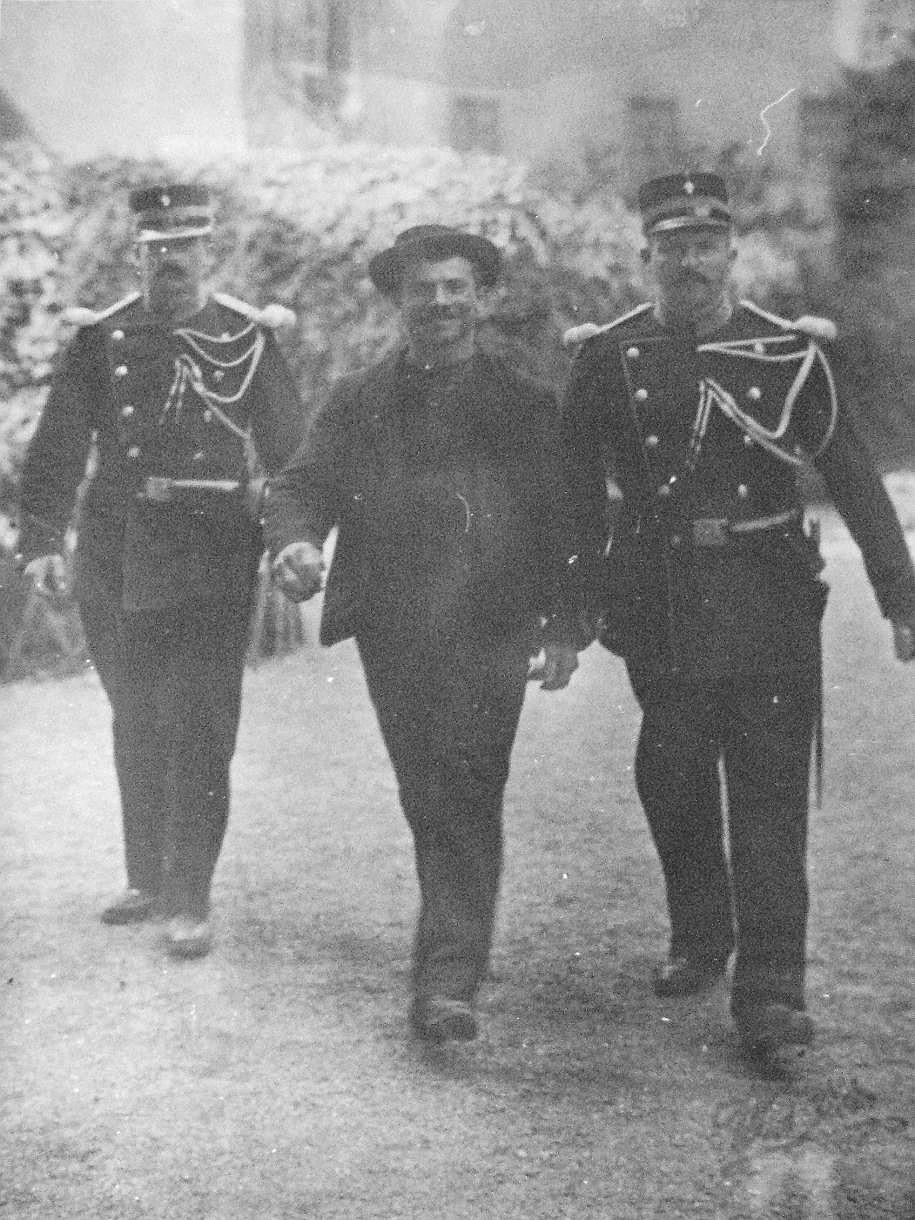
Luigi Lucheni, the assassin of Empress Elisabeth of Austria, grinning proudly as he is conducted to prison; Albert Borowitz considers him a Herostratic criminal.

Herostratus is sometimes considered the first terrorist. Modern terrorists, notes Borowitz, tend to follow his example, (Note: Defining terrorism is complicated. Albert Borowitz argues that a Herostratic crime mostly constitutes an act of terrorism according to Walter Laqueur's definition, "… a method—the substate application of violence to sow panic and bring about political change," except that it need not have political motives. Modern terrorism seems a different subject, partly because many perpetrators are not driven by political ideology but by supposed injustice, more in tune with Herostratus' motives. Many of the Herostratic criminals Borowitz lists were not impelled by politics, and so whether they can be deemed terrorists is uncertain since most definitions of terrorism incorporate a political motive, while some such as A. P. Schmid's (2011) do not.) as they hanker for publicity and try to surpass the injustice they perceive. Such injustice may be deeply personal and rooted in having little sense of meaning or self-worth. Per James W. Clarke's analysis of assassins, being unloved or confined to an existence without purpose are possible factors. While many, like Herostratus, are not ideologically or politically committed, others are committed though devoted to fame at the same time. (Note: One such terrorist is Samuel Byck, who attempted to hijack a plane and fly it into the White House. While he despised and intended to kill the president, he also sought posthumous glory, going as far as to record his plans on a tape and mailing it to celebrities.) Thus, some shun their claimed objectives, as when jihadist Mohammed Merah murdered three Muslim soldiers in 2012. In addition, modern acts of terror often deliberately appear senseless. (Note: In his rendering of the attempted Greenwich Observatory bombing, novelist Joseph Conrad opines, "The attack must have the shocking senselessness of gratuitous blasphemy.")

The Herostratic criminal targets a publicly valued symbol, an important person, or multiple people. Scholars such as Maxwell Taylor and Ethel Quayle argue that they require media coverage to gather celebrity; in one instance, the antitechnology terrorist Ted Kaczynski pledged to halt his bombing campaign if the New York Times and Washington Post published his manifesto. Driven by an urge to appear in the newspapers and to a far lesser extent by his anarchist leanings, Luigi Lucheni assassinated the Austrian empress Elisabeth, and during the trial that followed, he acted theatrically and "blew star's kisses to the audience". The attorney general made the case for forever wiping out his name. (Note: American writer Mark Twain writes about Lucheni and his motives, "When he saw his photograph and said, 'I shall be celebrated,' he laid bare the impulse that prompted him. It was a mere hunger for notoriety. There is another confessed case of the kind which is as old as history—the burning of the temple of Ephesus.") Similarly, Arthur Bremer, desperate for stardom, shot Alabama governor George Wallace in 1972. To him, the choice of victim depended on how much coverage he thought their assassination would garner. All these Herostratic criminals had a troubled past: Lucheni writes that he was deprived of love in childhood, and Kaczynski, among other things, suffered academic pressure from his parents and trauma from a harrowing college experiment.

Following September 11, numerous writers brought up Herostratus's name. Many of them considered the destruction of the World Trade Center, a potent American icon, as a venture for immortality akin to the Artemision's demolition. To achieve a higher sense of self-importance as well as to recruit more terrorists, states Borowitz, Osama bin Laden recorded a video of himself celebrating the terrorist attacks. A contemporary commentator wrote on Izvestia: "[The] highlighting of terrorism in mass media is a trigger for the Herostratus phenomenon. Every showing of a shop's explosion, mass murder and falling skyscrapers gives birth to more and more terrorists." The arson has also been paralleled with the Taliban's destruction of Buddhas in Afghanistan.

Such criminals who commit seemingly loathsome crimes for infamy's sake struggle with what Borowitz dubs the Herostratus syndrome. He lists seven elements forming the syndrome:

- An appetite for enduring and widespread fame or notoriety to promote a personal sense of power
- Intending to spark public "panic, distress, insecurity, or loss of confidence"
- Targeting a famous person, property, or institution
- Jealousy toward successful people caused by "loneliness, alienation, mediocrity, and failure"
- Self-destructive behavior after or during the crime's course
- Sacrilege or iconoclasm
- Other motives, such as those ideological

Herostratic criminals do not necessarily have a different psychological or pathological makeup from other people, such that Taylor and Quayle write: "Violence and brutality may characterise the criminal, yet ... we would be unlikely to place [them] within the category of clinical abnormality." Neither must insanity play a role in the syndrome; instead, someone like Herostratus may perpetrate a crime because they feel life has been unfair.

Philosopher Geoffrey Scarre considers Herostratus to discuss whether posthumous events can make one's life more significant. While noting that he did realize his dream, to secure fame, and thus his meaningless life seemingly gained meaning, Scarre concludes that the arson did not enrich Herostratus's life since "what is remembered about [him] is the pointless stupidity of the man and his project. If his was a strategy for evading absurdity, it was self-defeating in its own absurdity". Knibbe calls Herostratus a "useful idiot in the service of the priesthood".

== Bibliography ==
=== Books ===
- Borowitz, Albert (2005). Terrorism for Self-Glorification: The Herostratos Syndrome. Kent, Ohio: The Kent State University Press. ISBN 0-87338-818-6.
- Calafato, Trevor (2013). "Terrorism: A Thousand Year Occurrence". In Azzopardi, Jacqueline; Formosa, Saviour; Scicluna, Sandra; Willis, Andrew (eds.). Key Issues in Criminology: JANUS III. Malta: University of Malta. pp. 39–63. ISBN 978-99957-834-4-0.
- Fawcett, Julia H. (2016). Spectacular Disappearances: Celebrity and Privacy, 1696–1801. Ann Arbor, Michigan: University of Michigan Press. pp. 32–33. ISBN 978-0-472-11980-6.
- Fraser, Matthew (2022). Monumental Fury: The History of Iconoclasm and the Future of Our Past. Prometheus. ISBN 978-1-63388-810-4.
- Karwiese, Stefan (1995). Gross ist die Artemis von Ephesos: Die Geschichte einer der grossen Städt der Antike [Great is the Artemis of Ephesus: The History of One of the Great Cities of Antiquity] (in German). Phoibos Verlag. ISBN 978-3-901232-05-3.
- Kidder, David S.; Oppenheim, Noah D. (2010). The Intellectual Devotional Biographies. New York City, New York: Rodale, Inc. p. 46. ISBN 978-1-59486-513-8.
- Knibbe, Dieter (1998). Ephesus: Geschichte einer bedeutenden antiken Stadt und Portrait einer modernen Grossgrabung im 102. Jahr der Wiederkehr des Beginnes österreichischer Forschungen (1895–1997) [Ephesus: History of a Significant Ancient City and Portrait of a Major Modern Excavation, Marking the 102nd Anniversary of the Commencement of Austrian Research (1895–1997)] (in German). P. Lang. ISBN 978-3-631-32152-2.
- Price, Randall; House, H. Wayne (2017). Zondervan Handbook of Biblical Archaeology. Grand Rapids, Michigan: Zondervan. pp. 311–312. ISBN 978-0-310-28691-2.
- Scarre, Geoffrey (2007). Death. Montreal, Quebec: McGill-Queen's University Press. pp. 123–125. ISBN 978-0-7735-3241-0.

=== Studies ===
- Azam, Jean-Paul; Ferrero, Mario (2016). "Killing for the Sake of Infamy: The Herostratos Syndrome and what to Do about it". Peace Economics, Peace Science and Public Policy. 22 (4): 357–364. doi:10.1515/peps-2016-0022.
- Ribbans, Geoffrey (2010). ""La Verdad Sospechosa": Lying and Dramatic Structure Once More". De Filologia Hispanica. 26 (1): 139–156. doi:10.15581/008.26.4709. hdl:10171/20723.
- Street, Sarah (2020). "Colour and a Critique of Advertising: Privilege (Peter Watkins, 1967) and Herostratus (Don Levy, 1967)". Frames Cinema Journal. 17 (17). doi:10.15664/fcj.v0i17.2072. hdl:1983/8eb6c0b9-f143-4050-bfa1-a4064c8e1c59.

=== Websites ===
- Brinkhof, Tim (26 September 2023). "Herostratus: the man who destroyed an ancient wonder of the world". Big Think. Archived from the original on 19 July 2025.
- Cartwright, Mark (26 July 2018). "Temple of Artemis at Ephesus". World History Encyclopedia. Archived from the original on 2 October 2025.
- Ebiri, Bilge (27 September 2018). "'Let It Burn': Assassination Nation and the Cinema of the End". Vulture. Archived from the original on 1 October 2026.
- "Temple of Artemis at Ephesus". Encyclopædia Romana. Archived from the original on 9 October 2025.
