= Chersiphron =

Ancient Greek architect

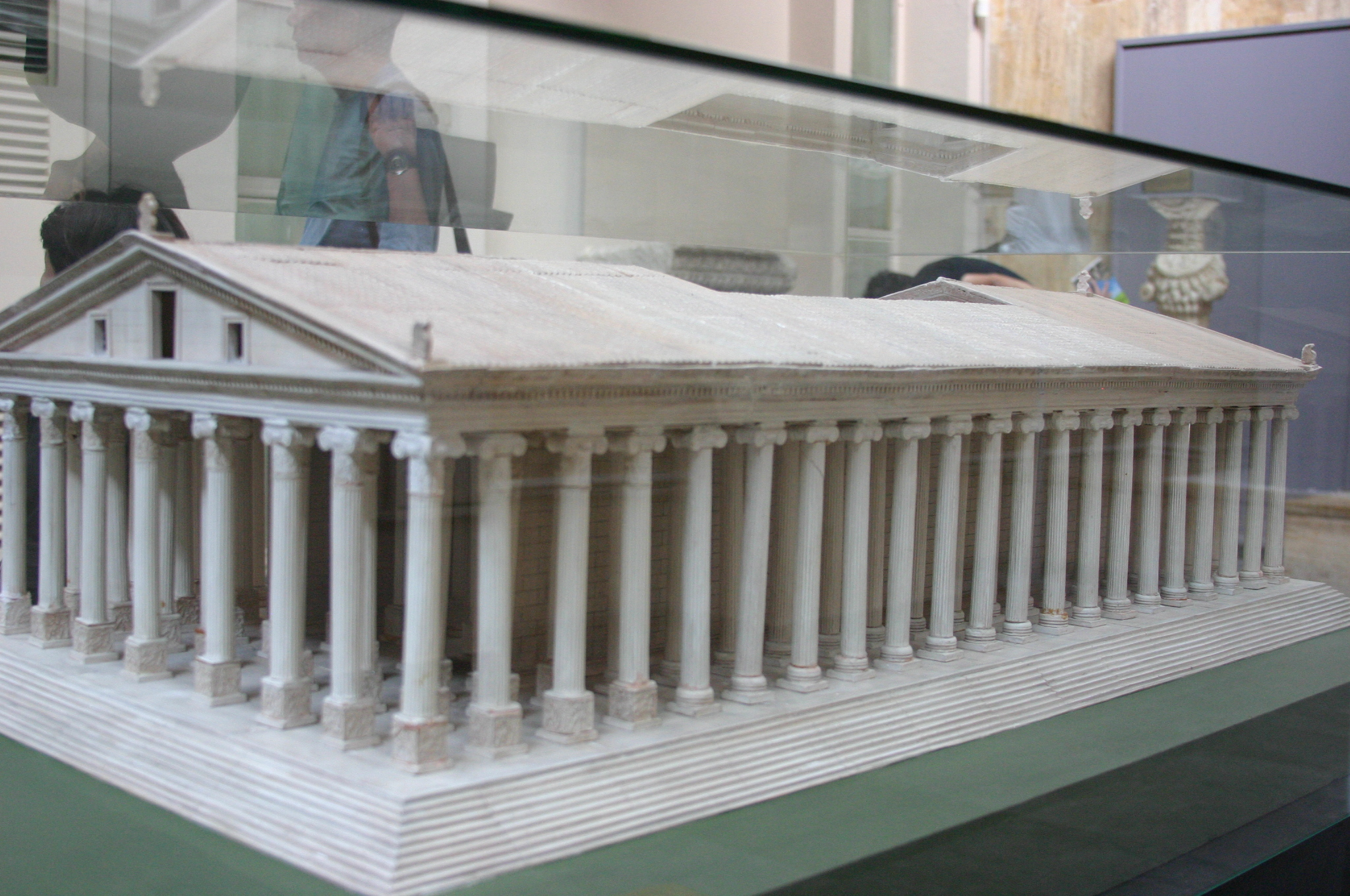
Model of the Temple of Artemis at Ephesus

Chersiphron (/ˈkɜːrsɪfrɒn/; Ancient Greek: Χερσίφρων; fl. 6th century BC) was a Greek architect from Knossos in ancient Crete who designed the Temple of Artemis at Ephesus. The original temple was destroyed in the 7th century BC, and about 550 BC Chersiphron and his son Metagenes began a new temple, the Artemision, which became one of the Seven Wonders of the Ancient World in each of its three manifestations. It was burned by Herostratus in July 356 BC and rebuilt again.

The architect's name is recalled in Vitruvius, and in a passage of Pliny as "Ctesiphon", perhaps in confusion with the great Parthian city of the same name on the river Tigris.
