= Melissonomoi =

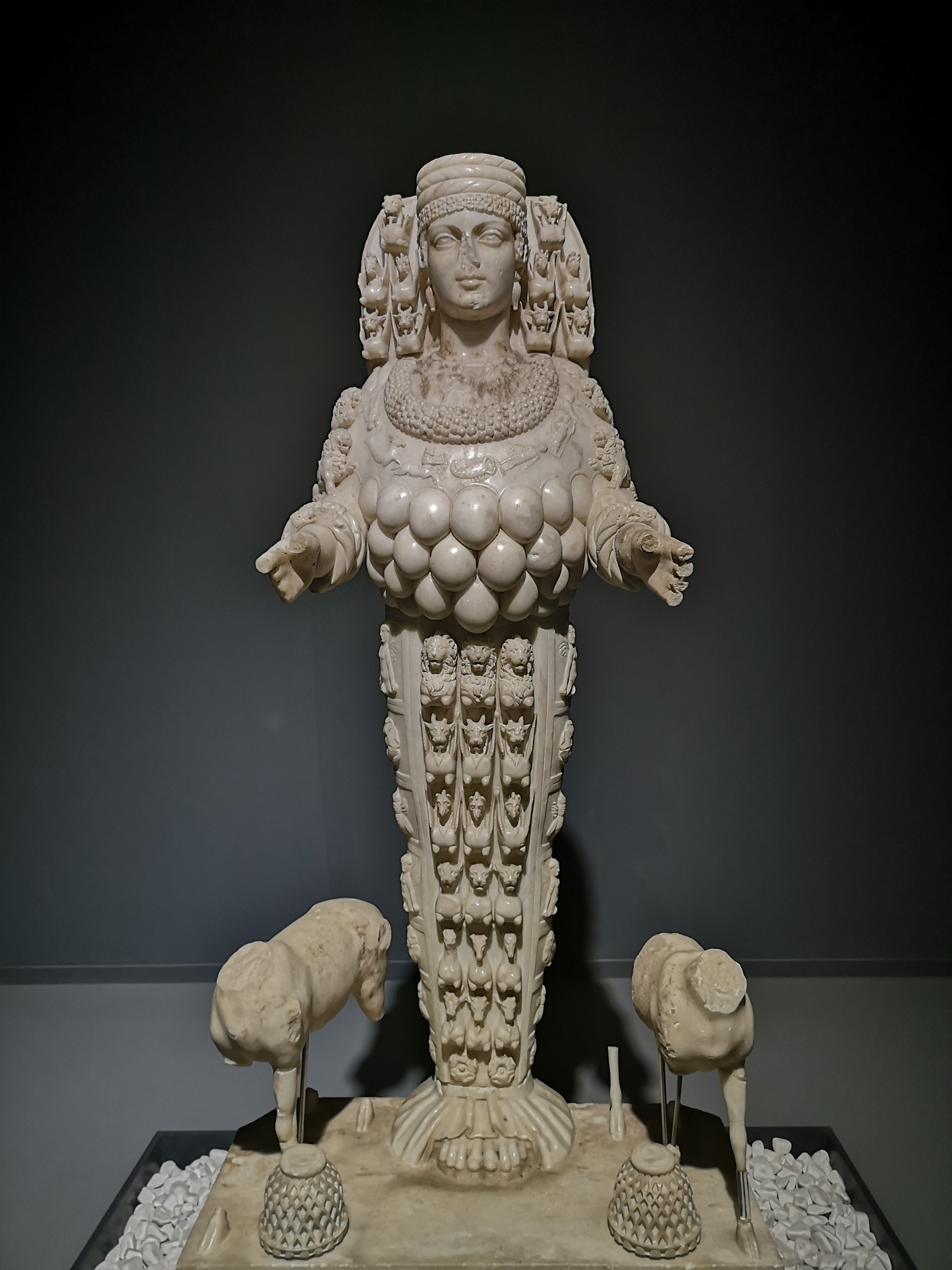
The Lady of Ephesus, no. 718, 1st century CE. Ephesus Archaeological Museum

Melissonomoi ('Bees') was the title of the Priestesses of the city cult of the Goddess Artemis of Ephesus.

The city cult of the Goddess Artemis in the Temple of Artemis in Ephesus was one of the biggest in the Ancient world. The city cult of Ephesus was originally not a Greek cult. While the Goddess of Artemis was identified with the Greek Goddess Artemis and had came to be known under that name, she was in fact a different local Anatolian Goddess.

The cult based in the temple was maintained by a number of both male and female priests. The priestesses were called 'Bees', Melissonomoi, and their High Priestess called the Bee keeper. The reason for this was that the Goddess was associated with bees. Her priestesses consumed liquid honey during nocturnal rituals, since this was viewed as the drink of the Goddess herself.
