= Phanes coins =

Coins of the 7th century BCE

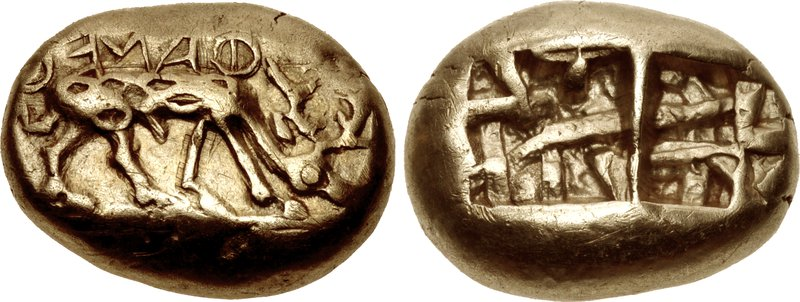
Electrum coin from Ephesus, 625–600 BC. Obverse: Stag grazing right, ΦΑΝΕΩΣ (retrograde). Reverse: Two incuse punches, each with raised intersecting lines.

The Phanes coins are a series of early electrum coins from Caria in Asia Minor. They were issued in seven denominations, the largest being the stater and the smallest 1/96 stater. Each is decorated with an image of a stag or part of stag on the obverse; additionally the two largest denominations have an inscription naming "Phanes", for which they are named. The Phanes coins are the most ancient inscribed coin series at present known.

== Coins ==
The Phanes coins are a series of coins issued in seven denominations: stater, 1/3, 1/6, 1/12, 1/24, 1/48, and 1/96 stater. The staters weigh 14.1 grams. All of the coins have the image of a stag or part of a stag on them. The coins were likely struck at Ephesus. There has been no systematic analysis of the metal content of all of the known coins, but twenty have been tested since the 1980s; of these fifteen have a gold content of between 40% and 47% and a silver content of between 51% and 56.5%.

The stater and 1/3 stater coins from this series both bear Greek inscriptions. The inscriptions are written right-to-left, and the letters are the mirror image of standard Greek letters. The longer inscription, on the stater, survives in three versions, which read: ΦΑΕΝΟΣ ΕΜΙ ΣHΜΑ ("Phaenos emi sema"), (Note: According to Wolfgang Fischer-Bossert, this inscription in fact reads ΦΑΝΝΟΣ ΕΜΙ ΣHΜΑ, the doubled nu being an error caused by a double strike.) ΦΑΝΟΣ ΕΜΙ ΣHΜΑ ("Phanos emi sema"), and ΦΑΝΕΟΣ ΕΙΜΙ ("Phaneos eimi"). This may be translated as "I am the badge/mark/symbol of Phanes" or "I am the sign of the bright one". (Note: "a vocabulary very close to the inscriptions on seals. A sixth century scarab had already an Archaic Greek inscription reading : "I am the sema of Thersis"") The shorter legend, on the 1/3 stater coins, is ΦΑΝΕΟΣ ("Phaneos", meaning "of Phanes").

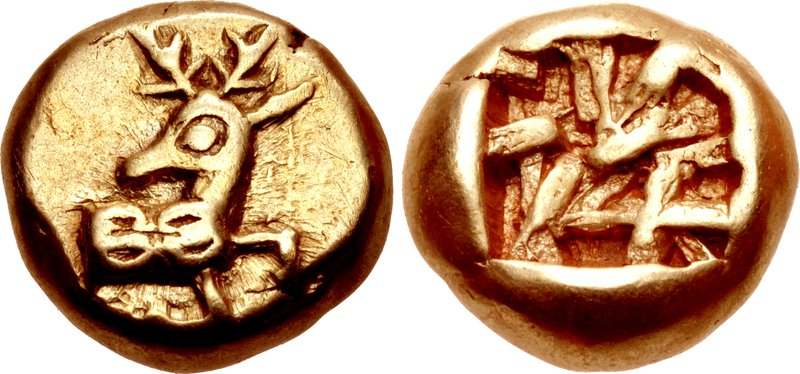
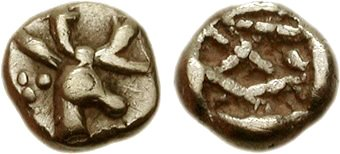
1/6 and 1/48 stater. The middle denominations of the series have the head and upper body of the stag on the obverse; the smallest denominations have the head alone.

As well as the inscription on the larger denominations, the obverse of the coins is decorated with an image of a stag: on the stater and 1/3 stater a walking stag is shown; on the 1/6, 1/12, and 1/24 stater coins it is the protome (head and upper body) of the stag; and the head alone for the 1/48 and 1/96 staters. On the reverse, square and retangular designs were punched, varying in size and number according to the denomination.

The coins of Phanes are amongst the earliest of Greek coins. One, a hemihekte (a twelfth stater) of the issue, was found in a jar in the foundations of the Temple of Artemis at Ephesus dated to the late seventh century BC, making that the earliest known hoard of coins. About 290 coins from the series are known, including seventeen staters. Five of the 1/24 staters appear to be modern cast forgeries; one of the staters is also dubious.

== Identity of Phanes ==
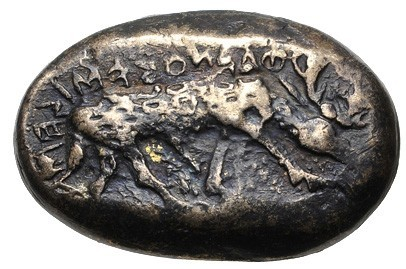
Electrum coin from Ephesus, 625–600 BC. Stag grazing right, legend unclear, possibly ΦΑΕΝΟΣ ΕΜΙ ΣΕΜΑ (“I am the badge/sign/mark of Phanes/the bright one”).

Phanes cannot be identified with certainty. He might have been the successful mercenary Phanes of Halicarnassus, described by Herodotus as serving first the Egyptian pharaoh Amasis II and then the Persian king Cambyses II in his invasion of Egypt. The coins might be associated with the primeval god Phanes, whose name means "light" or "shine", or that might have been an epithet of the local goddess identified with Artemis. Barclay V. Head found those suggestions unlikely and thought it more probably "the name of some prominent citizen of Ephesus". Wilhelm Kastner proposed that rather than being a person, Phanes refers to the town of Phanai on Chios.
