= Metagenes =

Ancient Greek architect in Ephesos

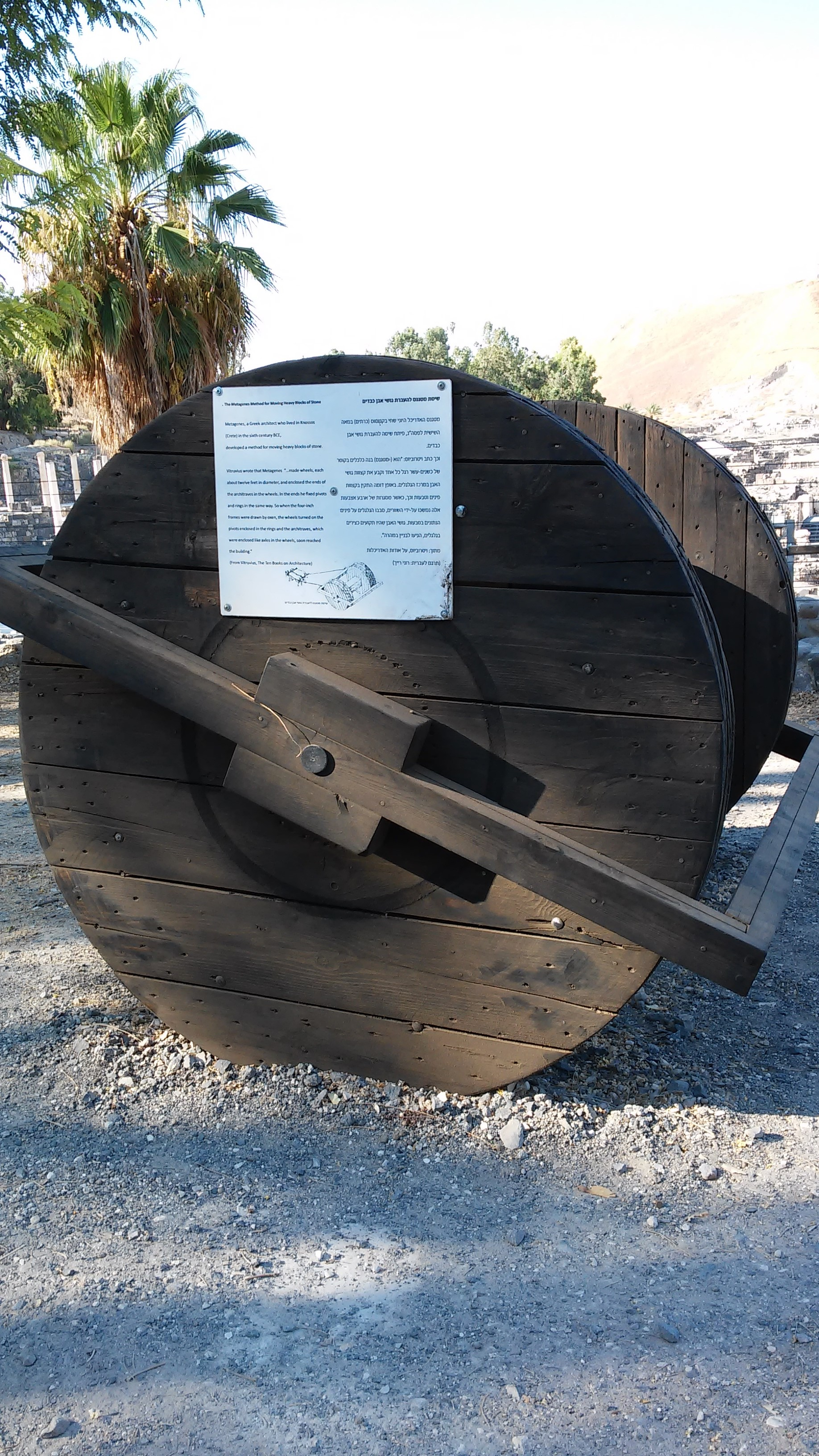
Side view of a reconstructed model of the Metagenes method for moving heavy stones. Ancient Beit Shean, Scythopolis

Metagenes (Greek: Μεταγένης) was a man in ancient Crete, son of the Greek Cretan architect Chersiphron, and was also an architect himself.

He was co-architect, along with his father, of the construction of the Temple of Artemis at Ephesus, one of the Seven Wonders of the Ancient World.

The architect's name is recalled in Vitruvius's De architectura.
