= Irene Ringwood Arnold =

American classics scholar

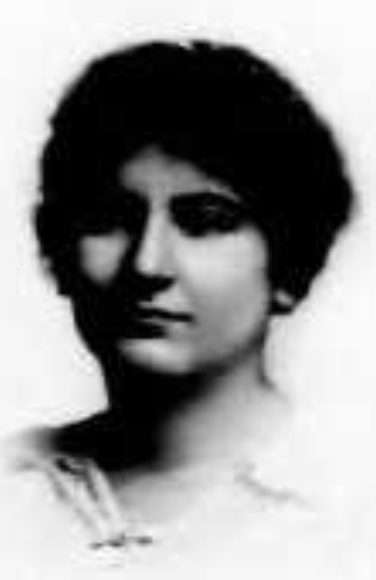
- Irene Ringwood, later Arnold, from her 1922 passport application
- Born: Irene Cecile Ringwood; October 31, 1895; Poughkeepsie, New York, U.S.
- Died: July 28, 1988 (age 92); Sagamore Beach, Massachusetts, U.S.
- Occupation(s): College professor, classics scholar

Irene Cecile Ringwood Arnold (October 31, 1895 – July 28, 1988) was an American classics scholar and educator. She taught Latin and Greek at Vassar College from 1920 to 1936, and headed the classics department at Bennett College from 1936 to 1960.

== Early life and education ==
Ringwood was born in Poughkeepsie, New York, the daughter of John F. Ringwood and Mary T. McGeney Ringwood. She and her sister Vera graduated from Vassar College in 1915. She completed her doctoral studies at Columbia University in 1927. She was a member of Phi Beta Kappa.

== Career ==
Arnold taught Latin and Greek at Vassar College from 1920 to 1925, while she was a graduate student. After earning her Ph.D., she was an assistant professor of Greek at Vassar from 1927 to 1936. From 1936 to 1960, she was head of the classics department at Bennett College in Millbrook, New York, and from 1960 until 1963 she was academic dean at Bennett.

Arnold belonged to the American Philological Association, the Archaeological Institute of America, and the London Society for Promotion of Hellenic Studies. She established a prize for Latin students at Poughkeepsie High School, in memory of her late sister Vera, and a scholarship for Latin and ancient history students at Choate Rosemary Hall, in memory of her late husband. In its later years, Bennett College had an "Arnold Society", a campus honor society named for Arnold.

== Publications ==
Arnold's articles were published in scholarly journals including American Journal of Archaeology, The Journal of Hellenic Studies, and The Classical Weekly.

- Agonistic Features of Local Greek Festivals Chiefly from Inscriptional Evidence (1927)
- "Local Festivals of Euboea, Chiefly from Inscriptional Evidence" (1929)
- "Local Festivals at Delos" (1933)
- "Ares in Coronea" (1934)
- "Festival at Rhodes" (1936)
- "The Shield of Argos" (1937)
- "A Portrait of Greek Island Life" (1947)
- "Agonistic Festivals in Italy and Sicily" (1960)
- "Festival of Ephesus" (1972)

== Personal life ==
In 1932, Ringwood married widower Herbert P. Arnold, head of the classics department at Choate Rosemary Hall. Her husband died in 1954. She died in 1988, at the age of 92, at her stepson's home in Sagamore Beach, Massachusetts. Bennett College closed in 1978, and the last campus structures were demolished in 2021 and 2022.
