= Marty (surname) =

Marty is a surname. Notable people with the surname include:

- Adam Marty (1837–1923), Swiss-born Minnesotan soldier
- Adolphe Marty (1865–1942), French composer
- Aileen Marty, Cuba-American pathologist
- Alexandre Marty (1894–1918), French flying ace
- Alain Marty (born 1946), French politician
- Arancha Marty (born 1973), Spanish rhythmic gymnast
- André Edouard Marty (1882–1974), French graphic artist
- André Marty (1886–1956), French communist and political commissar of the International Brigades during the Spanish Civil War (1936–1939)
- André Marty (rugby league) (1931–2004), French rugby player
- Anton Marty (1847–1914), Swiss-born Austrian philosopher
- Céline Marty (born 1976), French soccer player
- Christian Marty (1945–2000), French aviator and athlete who died in a plane crash
- David Marty (born 1982), French rugby player
- David Marty (footballer) (born 1972), French soccer player
- Dick Marty (1945–2023), Swiss politician
- Eric Marty, American football coach
- Éric Marty (born 1955), French professor
- François Marty (1904–1994), former Cardinal and Archbishop of Paris
- Frank Marty (1889–1950), American college football coach
- Frédéric Marty (1911–1940), French mathematician
- Henri Marty (Count Henri, Marie, Joseph, René Marty) (1887–1945), French educator, first Scoutmaster of the École des Roches in 1911
- Jacques Marty (1940–2012), French boxer
- Jean Marty (1838–1916), French lawyer and politician
- Jean-Claude Marty (1943–2023), French rugby player
- Jean-Pierre Marty (1932–2024), French pianist and conductor
- Jeanette Marty (born 1975), Swiss ice hockey player
- Joe Marty (1913–1984), American professional baseball player
- J. Sam Marty (born 1947), South Dakota politician
- John Marty (born 1956), member of the Minnesota Senate
- Julia Marty (born 1988), Swiss ice hockey player
- Louis-Charles Marty (1891–1970), French gymnast
- Martin E. Marty (1928–2025), American Lutheran religious scholar
- Martin Marty (bishop) (1834–1896), Swiss bishop
- Max Marty, Cuban-American businessman
- Melissa Marty (born 1984), Puerto Rican beauty pageant contestant
- Mickey Marty (1922–2013), American basketball player
- Niki Marty (born 1973), Swiss sport shooter
- Paul Marty (1882–1938), French military officer
- Rhea Fairbairn Marty (1890–1953), Canadian-American tennis player
- Sid Marty (born 1944), Canadian writer
- Silvia Marty (born 1980), Spanish actor
- Stefanie Marty (born 1988), Swiss ice hockey player
- Walter Marty (1910–1995), American high jumper

== Fictional people ==
- Emilia Marty, a central character in the play The Makropulos Affair by Karel Čapek and the opera based upon it by Leoš Janáček

== See also ==
- Charles Joseph Marty-Laveaux, French editer
- Mireille Delmas-Marty, French jurist
- Pierre Violet-Marty, French military pilot
