= Dan Dăscălescu =

Romanian-American entrepreneur (born 1980/81)

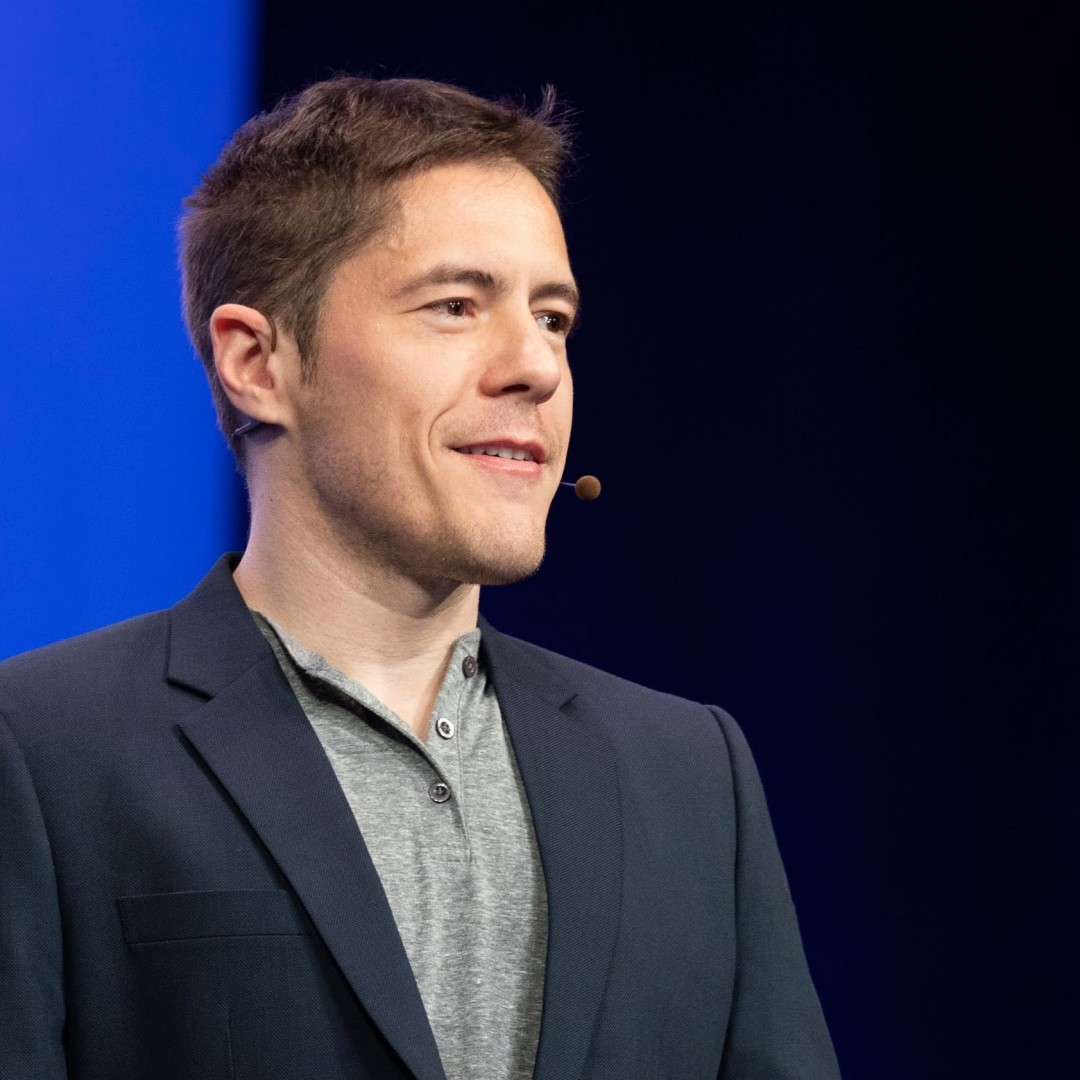
- Dan Dăscălescu speaking at Chrome Dev Summit 2018
- Born: 1980 or 1981 (age 45–46)
- Occupation: Entrepreneur
- Known for: Blueseed

Dan Dăscălescu is a Romanian-American entrepreneur based in Silicon Valley, who co-founded the ship-based seed accelerator project Blueseed in an attempt to allow entrepreneurs to start companies near Silicon Valley without US visa restrictions. He is also a public speaker and former software engineer at Google and Yahoo! and ambassador for The Seasteading Institute, a think tank researching ocean communities.

== Biography ==
Dăscălescu was born in Romania and immigrated into Silicon Valley in fall 2004, after facing visa issues. He applied for a green card in 2007 and received it in April 2013. Dăscălescu cited his visa difficulties as an inspiration for Blueseed, a startup accelerator that would avoid immigration restrictions by being located on a ship in international waters.

Before Blueseed, Dăscălescu worked at Yahoo! as a software globalization developer and open-source contributor, and became an ambassador for the Seasteading Institute and founded the Quantified Self Forum, an online community for users passionate about self-tracking.

While in Romania, he translated books on TCP/IP networking and on building web applications. Dascalescu has a degree in Computer Science, with published papers on knowledge modeling and robotics.

Most recently, Dăscălescu worked as a Developer Advocate for AI startup Weaviate and Google.

== Blueseed ==
Blueseed was a startup community project that Dăscălescu co-founded with Seasteading Institute colleagues Max Marty and Dario Mutabdzija, and served as CIO for. The project prepared to launch a ship near Silicon Valley to serve as a startup community and entrepreneurial incubator without United States work visa requirements. The platform was set to offer living and office space, high-speed Internet connectivity, and regular ferry service to the mainland. The existence of the project is due to the lack of U.S. visas for entrepreneurs. Instead, customers will use the much easier to obtain B-1/B-2 visas to travel to the mainland, while work will be done exclusively on the ship.

On July 31, 2013, Dăscălescu became COO of Blueseed, after CEO Max Marty announced he was stepping back from day-to-day operations.

== Personal ==
Dăscălescu's interests include transhumanism, life extension, physical fitness and self-quantification. He completed the P90X program and presented his findings at the 2011 Quantified Self conference, contrasting it with the Occam Protocol described by Tim Ferriss in Four Hour Body. He is an open-source contributor, advocates for English to be used as a global language and challenges religion.
