= Sarty =

Sarty is a surname. Notable people with the surname include:

- Glenn Sarty (1930–2007), Canadian television producer
- Ralph Sarty, American politician
- Roger Sarty (born 1952), Canadian historian

== See also ==
- Marty (surname)
- Novyye Sarty
- Sarti
