= Stossel (TV series) =

Defunct American TV series

- Genre: Talk show, political commentary
- Presented by: John Stossel
- Country of origin: United States
- Original language: English
- No. of seasons: 7
- No. of episodes: 309

Production
- Running time: 60 minutes

Original release
- Network: Fox Business Network; Fox News Channel
- Release: December 10, 2009 – December 16, 2016

Stossel is a weekly American television talk show, hosted by John Stossel, highlighting current consumer issues, with a libertarian viewpoint. It was broadcast between 2009 and 2016. The program debuted on December 10, 2009, on the Fox Business Network and aired on Fridays—originally at 8:00 pm EST, but was moved to 9:00 pm EST. In 2013, Fox News Channel began to replay the show occasionally on weekends.

John Stossel moderated the first-ever nationally televised Libertarian presidential debate on April 1, 2016. The second part of the debate aired on April 8.

The final episode premiered on December 16, 2016. At the end of that episode, a retrospective that spotlighted moments from seven years of the program, Stossel explained that due to his age, he wanted to help develop a younger generation of journalists with his views, and would continue to appear as a guest on Fox programs, and also help produce content for Reason TV.

== Format ==
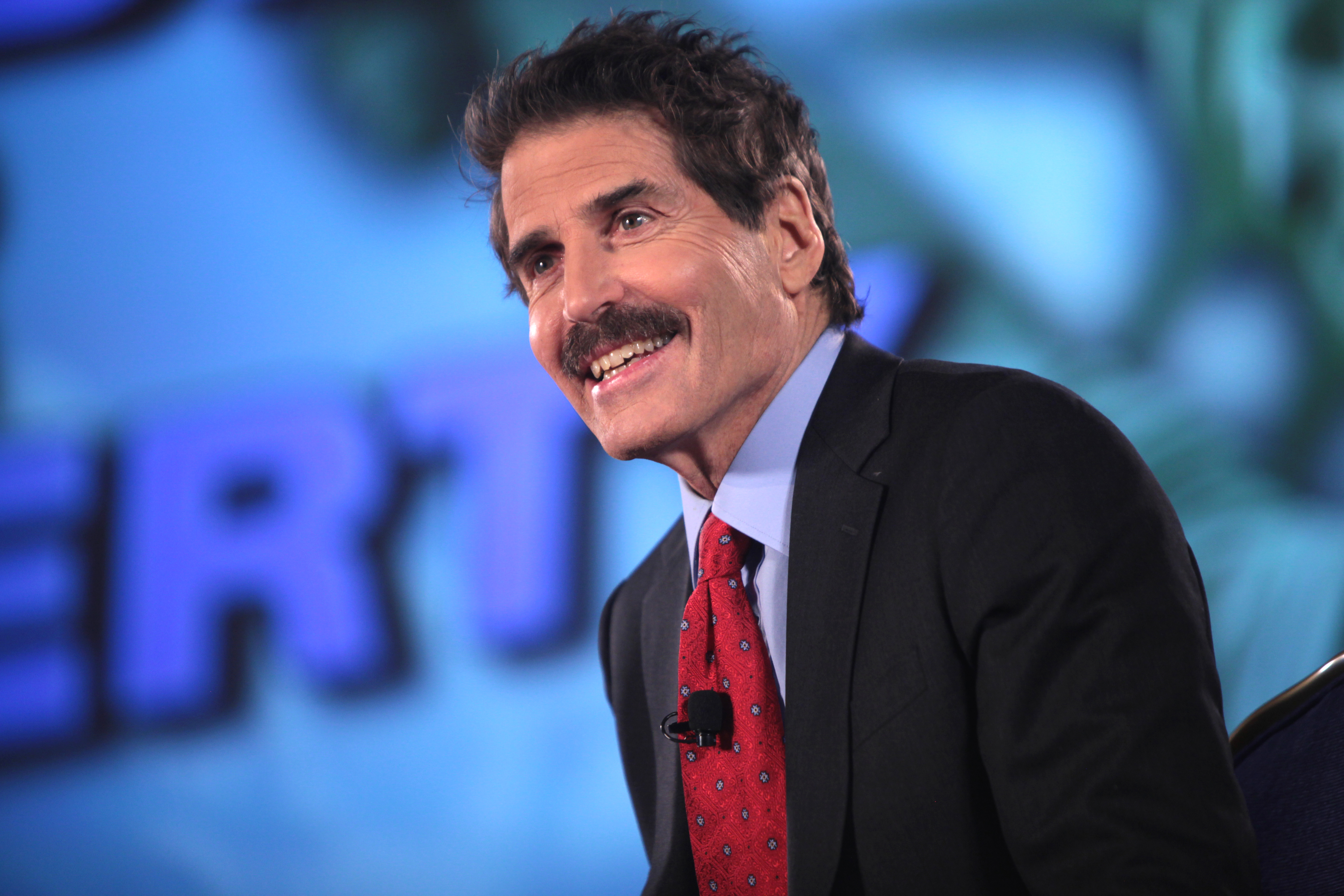
Stossel during a live taping of the show

Each show was filmed before a studio audience and edited to fit the hour-long format. Experts were brought in from both sides to discuss the issues with Stossel, who sometimes played devil's advocate with guests whose views mirrored his own. Episodes also included segments filmed outside the studio. At the end of each show, the studio audience was allowed to ask questions of some of the guests.

Beginning with the August 5, 2010, show, Fox Business renovated and expanded the Stossel studio.

== Episode list ==
=== Season 1: 2009–2010 ===
Title	Guest(s)	Airdate	Ep. #
"Global Climate Change"	Jerry Taylor, Stephen Dubner	December 10, 2009	1
The premiere episode deals with the Global warming controversy. Stossel talks with Jerry Taylor, an energy analyst at the Cato Institute, who explains the economic impact of global warming and expresses his belief the impact will be fairly minimal. He also interviews Stephen Dubner, author of SuperFreakonomics.
"Paying for Healthcare"	John Mackey	December 17, 2009	2
The discussion includes “reformers” who say they will improve American health care. The studio audience includes single-payer activists and members of the NYU Young Communist Club. Stossel interviews Whole Foods CEO John Mackey, who discusses the positive effects of a boycott by progressives after he wrote an Op Ed that was critical of Government-Care.
"Atlas Shrugged"	John Allison, Yaron Brook, Nick Gillespie	January 7, 2010	3
The impact of the book Atlas Shrugged and why it is more popular today than when it was released. Also, who is today's Wesley Mouch – the audience overwhelmingly chooses Barney Frank.
"Crony Capitalism"	Jonathan Blake and Annette Meeks of Freedom Foundation of Minnesota, Denis Calabrese (former Chief of Staff for Dick Armey), Tim Carney author of The Big Ripoff	January 14, 2010	4
Discusses examples where Big Business has used the clout of Big Government to get special privileges or protect themselves from competition, known as crony capitalism. The show examines government support of Serious Materials and using regulations to prevent new competition in the toy industry.
"Energy Independence"	T. Boone Pickens, Robert Bryce	January 21, 2010	5
Stossel speaks with T. Boone Pickens, an oilman and advocate of becoming energy independent. Video is shown of Stossel challenging his guest T. Boone Pickens to a $10,000 bet about the price of oil that will end May 22, 2010. Author Robert Bryce debates Pickens on the merits of energy independence.
"Food Police"	Nick Gillespie	January 28, 2010	6
The panel discusses efforts to regulate food by taxing and banning salt, trans fat, and sugary drinks. The discussion turns heated as Nick Gillespie debates a trial lawyer who brings class-action lawsuits against makers of fast food.
"Things Are Getting Better"	Alan Tonelson, Arthur C. Brooks, Christopher Flavin, Steven F. Hayward, Clark Ervin, John Mueller	February 4, 2010	7
Stossel interviews people who think things are getting worse, and then looks at four areas of life that are arguably getting better for people due to free markets: the economy, pollution, terrorism, and culture. Each segment features a debate from both sides of the argument.
"The Road to Serfdom"	Dave Low, Paul Ryan, Arthur C. Brooks, Matt Welch	February 11, 2010	8
This show examines the welfare state, predicted in Hayek's The Road to Serfdom, in which serfs are allowed to work and keep some of their money, but must give the rest to their rulers to keep them safe. Stossel confronts Rep. Paul Ryan of Wisconsin and asks him why, if he supports free markets, he voted for the Troubled Asset Relief Program and automaker bailouts. Stossel examines the Kurt Vonnegut short story Harrison Bergeron and sees parallels today.
"Imprisoning Kids"	Kevin P. Chavous, Eva Moskowitz, Scott Stringer, James Tooley	February 18, 2010	9
Stossel discusses the failure of government run schools and ballooning costs, and explores ways to increase competition through private charter schools or school voucher programs. Success Academy Charter Schools (then known as Harlem Success Academy) founder Eva Moskowitz debates Scott Stringer about charter schools versus government schools. The $166 billion cost of Head Start Program and failure to provide lasting results past Grade 1 is also discussed.
"Hands Off My Meds"	John Crowley, Montel Williams, Dr. Arnold Relman, Alan Chow	February 25, 2010	10
Stossel asks the audience if they think the FDA keeps us safer. He interviews John Crowley, who is portrayed in the film Extraordinary Measures. Regulation supporter Dr. Arnold Relman debates Stossel's brother Dr. Thomas Stossel of Harvard Medical School. Alan Chow, an eye surgeon who developed an implant to allow blind people to see, describes the FDA process which took seven years and $50 million before he ran out of funds. Montel Williams explains why he requires medical marijuana to manage pain caused by multiple sclerosis.
"Prohibition"	Jacob Sullum, Wendy Murphy	March 4, 2010	11
A discussion of American prohibitions and illegal acts that are actual voluntary and/or consensual. Included are prohibitionists who claim their rules are necessary for the public or individuals' own good, and the unintended side effects of drug prohibition. Former prosecutor Wendy Murphy debates a former sex-trade worker about whether or not prostitution is a form of slavery.
"Licensing Madness"	Chip Mellor, Andrew Napolitano	March 11, 2010	12
An interview with two unlicensed florists who are breaking the law by selling flowers. They debate Mike Rome of the Louisiana State Florists Association. Chip Mellor of the Institute for Justice explains how his organization sues states with unconstitutional laws. David Price discusses how he was imprisoned for over a year for writing a legal letter on behalf of a volunteer. New Jersey State lawyer Albert Cohn argues for legal licensing against Judge Andrew Nepolitano.
"Saving Cleveland"	Drew Carey, Dennis Kucinich, Nick Gillespie, Steven Malanga, Stephen Goldsmith, Randal O'Toole	March 18, 2010	13
A supplement to the reason.tv online series Reason Saves Cleveland. The show deals with Cleveland, once America's 6th largest city, now reduced to less than half the previous population, which libertarians believe is due to overtaxation and central planning. An interview with author J.C. Bradbury, who says there is no economic benefit to taxpayer subsidized sports stadiums. Drew Carey speaks with former Cleveland mayor Dennis Kucinich, who believes state owned institutions are better than private business.
"The Biggest Rip-Off"	Paul Ryan, David Certner, Veronique de Rugy	March 25, 2010	14
Representative Paul Ryan and Mercatus Center economist Veronique de Rugy talk about the current financial outlook. David Certner of the AARP believes entitlement programs must continue. Author Joel Kotkin explains how other countries have it worse. Stossell confronts a lawyer who helps people hide assets so that they can collect Medicaid benefits meant to go to the poor.
"Junk Science"	Jerry Taylor, Christina Hoff Sommers, Roy Spencer	April 1, 2010	15
Discusses junk science. As an example, Stossel convinces New Yorkers to sign a ban on dihydrogen monoxide, better known as water. He examines global warming myths, alternate energy sources, nuclear energy, and the lack of women in engineering, physics and mathematics.
"What Am I?"	P. J. O'Rourke, Andrew Napolitano, Jeffrey Miron, Deroy Murdock, Wendy McElroy, David Boaz	April 8, 2010	16
Stossel examines what it is to be a libertarian.
"Tax Insanity"	Neal Boortz	April 15, 2010	17
An examination of the American income tax code and the proposed FairTax.
"Lies, Myths and Stupidity"	Michael Medved, Stephanie Soechtig, Scott Bullock, and Richard Tren	April 22, 2010	18
An examination of lies, myths and stupidity about capitalism, bottled water, property seizure and DDT.
"Free Trade"	Lou Dobbs, Tom G. Palmer, June Arunga, Johan Norberg, Donald J. Boudreaux	April 29, 2010	19
A debate with Lou Dobbs, who believes in balanced trade as opposed to free trade.
"Government Bullies"	Anya Kamenetz	May 6, 2010	20
This episode looks at bans for charging carry-on baggage fees, bans on chewing tobacco, union attempts to force kids into attending only government-run schools, and unpaid internships. A debate with Village Voice writer Anya Kamenetz and author of DIY U about unpaid internships.
"Bans on Betting"	Chad Hills	May 13, 2010	21
Stossel looks at government bans on gambling.
"Free Speech"	Ayaan Hirsi Ali	May 20, 2010	22
Interviews with people who speak their mind about Islam despite death threats and prosecution, including Ayaan Hirsi Ali, who produced a film about Islam's subjugation of women with Dutch moviemaker Theo Van Gogh.
"Going Green"	Robert Bryce, Heather Rogers, Bjørn Lomborg, Greg Kutz	May 27, 2010	23
An examination of the green movement, including claims that wind power, solar power, and electric cars will make a significant impact. Guests include Robert Bryce (author of Power Hungry) and Heather Rogers, a progressive environmentalist (author of Green Gone Wrong). Bjørn Lomborg, a self-professed leftist and environmentalist, talks about the top 30 problems facing the world, and claims that global warming is 14th, 29th, and 30th on the list. The Energy Star program is also dissected.
"Free to Choose"	Benjamin Barber, David Boaz, Johan Norberg	June 10, 2010	24
A look at Milton Friedman's Free to Choose and the impact it has had on other countries. Includes an interview with Benjamin Barber, a critic of Friedman.
"Drug War Disaster"	Sean Hannity	June 17, 2010	25
The war on drugs and its critics. Includes a debate with Sean Hannity, who argues that legalizing drugs would result in more problems.
"More Guns Less Crime"	Denis Hannigan	June 24, 2010	26
A debate on gun control with Brady Campaign vice president Dennis Hannigan. Includes statistics showing that crime actually decreases when conceal and carry laws are abandoned.
"The Trouble with Lawyers"	Geoffrey Fieger	July 8, 2010	27
The show covers personal injury lawyers who claim to be protecting the little guy but keep up to 40% of what they win. Examines what personal injury lawsuits do to the cost of products. Interviews include Geoffrey Fieger, a trial lawyer, and the US Chamber Institute for Legal Reform which contends that small businesses that are harassed and sometimes even forced out of business by dubious lawsuits.
"Freedom Under Siege"		July 15, 2010	28
"The Immigration Debate"		July 22, 2010	29
"Sex & The Law"		July 29, 2010	30
"Planes, Trains & Automobiles"		August 5, 2010	31
When a private company operates a public facility under contract to government, it must perform. Otherwise, it will be fired as its contract will not be renewed. Government is never fired. Contracting out to private enterprise is not the same thing as letting fully competitive free markets operate but still works better than government.
"The Americans with Disabilities Act"		September 2, 2010	32
The nasty, unintended consequences of the Americans with Disabilities Act.
"Entrepreneurs Under Attack"		September 9, 2010	33
Everyone says he likes small business. Even big-government types. Then, they find all kinds of reasons to make business owners jump through hoops for the right to operate.
"Government Schools 2"		September 16, 2010	34
"The Trouble with Lawyers 2"		September 23, 2010	35
"Should Everyone Vote"		September 30, 2010	36
"Bankrupting America"		October 7, 2010	37
"The Power to Prosper"		October 14, 2010	38
"Election Myths"	Matt Welch, Karl Rove, Joe Trippi, Angelo Codevilla	October 21, 2010	39
Examines whether it matters if Republicans or Democrats are elected. Republicans claim to shrink government and Democrats claim to be "pro-choice," but Stossel believes those are myths. Karl Rove defends Republicans while Joe Trippi defends Democrats.
"Scare Stories"		October 28, 2010	40
Scare stories by the media – an examination of the probabilities for different causes of death and discovery that media overreports of certain causes of death and underreports others.
"Libertarians and the Election"	Ron Paul, Matt Welch, Bill O'Reilly, Ellis Henican	November 4, 2010	41
Results of the November 2010 mid-term elections. Explores if some voters shied away from certain candidates out of ignorance and a misconception of what libertarians are really about.
"Politically Incorrect"		November 11, 2010	42
"Food Fight"		November 18, 2010	43
"Public or Private Ownership"		November 25, 2010	44
"You Owe $200,000 To The Fed"		December 2, 2010	45
"Liberty 2010"		December 9, 2010	46
"Skepticism & Religion"		December 16, 2010	47
"Who is more charitable: Democrats or Republicans"		December 30, 2010	48

=== Season 2: 2011 ===
Title	Guest(s)	Airdate	Ep. #
"Uncle Sam Shouldn't be Making Your Resolutions"		January 5, 2011	1
"Meet the New Boss"		January 13, 2011	2
"The Curse of Good Intentions"		January 20, 2011	3
"Balancing the Budget"		January 27, 2011	4
"Sports"		February 3, 2011	5
"Spontaneous Order"		February 10, 2011	6
"The Future"		February 17, 2011	7
"Hollywood"		February 24, 2011	8
"Battles at Home and Abroad"		March 3, 2011	9
"Americas Heroes...not"		March 10, 2011	10
"Stop the Spending"		March 17, 2011	11
"Leave me Alone"		March 24, 2011	12
"Freeloaders" (special)		March 25, 2011	13
"Students for Liberty"		March 31, 2011	14
"Budget Wars"	Rep. Scott Garrett, Veronique De Rugy, Nick Gillespie, Benjamin Friedman, Grace-Marie Turner, Sen. Rand Paul, David Callahan, Yaron Brook	April 7, 2011	15
"Makers vs. Takers"		April 14, 2011	16
"Privacy vs. Security"		April 21, 2011	17
"Ron Paul 2012"		April 28, 2011	18
"Freeloaders Talk Back"		May 5, 2011	19
"Good Energy/Bad Energy"		May 12, 2011	20
"Politically Incorrect" (rerun of November 11, 2010)		May 19, 2011	X
"American (Budget) Idol"		May 26, 2011	21
"Government Help Hurts"		June 2, 2011	22
"Gary Johnson 2012"		June 9, 2011	23
"The Money Hole" (special)		June 12, 2011	24
"The Trouble with Lawyers 3"		June 16, 2011	25
"Declaration of Independents"		June 23, 2011	26
"The College Scam"		June 30, 2011	27
"On the Road to Serfdom"		July 7, 2011	28
"Herman Cain 2012"		July 14, 2011	29
"Politically Incorrect History"		July 21, 2011	30
"Debt Solution"		July 28, 2011	31
"Government in My Car"		August 4, 2011	32
"Defending the Indefensible"		August 11, 2011	33
"GOP debates"		August 18, 2011	X
"Politically Incorrect" (rerun of November 11, 2010)		August 25, 2011	X
"Government Help Hurts" (rerun of June 2)		September 1, 2011	X
"10 Years After 9-11"		September 8, 2011	34
"Question Authority"		September 15, 2011	35
"Stupid in America" (special)		September 17, 2011	36
"Creating Jobs"		September 22, 2011	37
"Libertarians in Charge"		September 30, 2011	38
"Job Killers"		October 6, 2011	39
"Liberate Wall Street"		October 13, 2011	40
"Reaction to Stupid in America"		October 20, 2011	41
"Stupid Consumers"		October 27, 2011	42
"Big Govt-Rejected"		November 3, 2011	43
"The Money Hole" (rerun of June 12)		November 10, 2011	X
"Enemies of Free Speech"		November 17, 2011	44
"Public vs. Private" (rerun of November 25, 2010)		November 24, 2011	X
"Unintended Consequences"		December 1, 2011	45
"Creating Jobs 2"		December 8, 2011	46
"Govt Healthcare Gone Wrong"		December 15, 2011	47
"What a Wonderful World"	Matt Ridley, Sonia Arrison, Max Marty, Dario Mutabdzija	December 22, 2011	48
Contrasts the media's fascination with death with examples of technological progress, increased standard of living, and "entrepreneurs who do what only governments could do before", citing Peter Diamandis and Blueseed.
"Libertarian Year in Review"		December 29, 2011	49

=== Season 3: 2012 ===
Title	Guest(s)	Airdate	Ep. #
"Champions of Freedom"		January 5, 2012	1
"Your Instincts are Wrong"		January 12, 2012	2
"The War Over War"		January 19, 2012	3
"The Real State of the Union"		January 26, 2012	3
Stossel's opinion on the state of the country.
"The Pursuit of Happiness"		February 2, 2012	4
Stossel looks at what makes people happy.
"Who Can You Trust"		February 9, 2012	5
How the government and media can distort information.
"Budget Insanity"		February 16, 2012	6
Ways the government wastes money.
"2012 Students for Liberty"		February 23, 2012	7
The 2012 International Students for Liberty Conference, an annual gathering of student libertarians.
"Illegal Everything" (special)		February 24, 2012	8
How the laws of governments have gotten out of control, resulting in many people unable to do simple tasks.
"Money and Banking Evil"	Sandra Smith, Paul Levy, John Taylor, John Taylor, Bob Murphy, Russell Roberts, Benjamin Barber, David Barker	March 1, 2012	9
The morals and integrity of the financial industry.
"Too Many Laws"		March 8, 2012	10
"Is it fair"		March 15, 2012	11
"Illegal Jobs"		March 22, 2012	12
"Stupid in America" (rerun of September 17, 2011)		March 29, 2012	X
"Media Bias"		April 5, 2012	13
"No They Can't"		April 12, 2012	14
"on campus for No They Can't"		April 19, 2012	15
"Illegal Everything" (rerun of 2/24)		April 26, 2012	X
"Regulation Nation"		May 3, 2012	16
"On the Road to Serfdom 2"		May 10, 2012	17
"Bad Speech"		May 17, 2012	18
"Rich Man Poor Man"	Charles Sykes, Cliff Asness, Patrick Byrne, Lamont Hill, Charles Goyette, Scott Rasmussen	May 24, 2012	19
"Fuel Myths"		May 31, 2012	20
"Decline Whine"		June 7, 2012	21
"Lawsuit Abuse"		June 14, 2012	22
"Obamacare on Trial"		June 21, 2012	23
"Government Inc"		June 28, 2012	24
"First Jobs"		July 12, 2012	25
"Minimum Justice"		July 19, 2012	26
"Myths and Truths"		July 26, 2012	27
"No They Can't (rerun of April's)"		August 2, 2012	X
"N/A"		August 9, 2012	X
"Politician's Top 10 Promises Gone Wrong (rerun)"		August 16, 2012	X
"Republican Convention"		August 31, 2012	28
"Democratic Convention"		September 6, 2012	29
"Party Crashers"		September 13, 2012	30
"Union Power"		September 20, 2012	31
"Stossel Goes to College"		September 27, 2012	32
"After the Welfare State"		October 4, 2012	33
"Winning The Presidency"		October 11, 2012	34
"Is Greed Good"		October 18, 2012	35
"Political Propaganda"		October 25, 2012	36
"Disaster and Election Myths"		November 4, 2012	37
"Did Freedom Win"		November 8, 2012	38
"Four More Years"		November 15, 2012	39
"Tragedy Of The Commons"		November 22, 2012	40
"Food Bunk"		November 29, 2012	41
"Good Intentions Gone Wrong"		December 6, 2012	42
"Science vs. God"		December 13, 2012	43
"Good Giving"		December 20, 2012	44

=== Season 4: 2013 ===
Title	Guest(s)	Airdate	Ep. #
"Freedom 2.0"		January 3, 2013	1
Examples of how markets regulate better than government.
"Business of Bad News"		January 10, 2013	2
How to respond to negative publicity and the big business and profit made from bad news.
"Texas vs. California"		January 17, 2013	3
Stossel compares Texas and California.
"Obama: Part II"		January 24, 2013	4
Stossel looks at what a second term under President Obama will be like following the big inauguration event.
"Big Sports, Big Business"		January 31, 2013	5
Do the rules on sports betting, gambling, ticket scalping and mixed martial arts make sense? John Stossel and guests take a look.
"State of the Union"		February 14, 2013	6
Libertarian panel anaylzes president's speech.
"Liberty 101"		February 21, 2013	7
Stossel hosts in front of 1,000 students at the Students for Liberty conference in Washington, D.C.
"The Debt Bomb"		February 28, 2013	8
A look at sequester cuts with Sen. Rand Paul and Megyn Kelly and Greg Gutfeld try to pick the real and the fake government programs.
"The Blob"		March 7, 2013	9
"Back to College"		March 21, 2013	10
"Green Tyranny"		March 28, 2013	11
Stossel looks at environmental issues like climate change, endangered species and green energy.
"The Chosen Ones"		April 4, 2013	12
Stossel looks at crony capitalism and monopolies that government picks as the 'chosen' ones.
"Death by Taxes"		April 11, 2013	13
Stossel holds a 'real or fake' contest about taxes, exposes hidden fees and looks at an IRS parody video.
"The Blob Strikes Back"		April 18, 2013	14
Stossel looks at a charter school in Oakland that may be shut down and examines school choices and education unions.
"Free Market Medicine"		April 25, 2013	15
Stossel looks at affordable medical care offered by an Oklahoma doctor, guests debate the merits of ObamaCare and a veterinarian fights to keep his online consultations active.
"Rumble in the States"		May 2, 2013	16
Stossel examines the differences in economic and social freedom between the states and Kennedy takes a special trip to Denver for a 4/20 celebration.
"Whatever Happened to Grit"		May 9, 2013	17
Where is today's John Wayne? Stossel asks the cowboy libertarian and others about perseverance.
"War Against the Little Guy"		May 16, 2013	18
The 'little guy' already has to compete with big competitors, but Stossel shows how regulation is stifling small business.
"Gas Myths"		May 23, 2013	19
Just ahead of the summer driving season, Stossel and his guests challenge the conventional wisdom about oil and gasoline.
"The Fight over Austerity"		May 30, 2013	20
Stossel explains why he calls himself an "austerian" and his guests will show why budget cuts aren't as big or bad as you may have heard.
"War on..."		June 6, 2013	21
Stossel and his guests look at different 'wars' like the war on terror, the war on business and the war on food.
"The Fight over the American Dream"		June 13, 2013	22
In the midst of a heated immigration reform battle, Stossel's special correspondent Kennedy visits the border and guests debate whether immigration helps or hurts America.
"Big Brother"		July 9, 2013	23
Is 'Big Brother' NSA watching you? Stossel questions whether the surveillance programs are as bad as people think.
"Trouble with Lawyers"		July 23, 2013	24
Guests debate whether or not some lawsuits are abusive and the audience picks the wackiest warning label.
"Are We Rome?"		August 1, 2013	25
Guests debate whether or not America is headed towards the same demise as other great civilizations in history. Filmed at Freedom Fest 2013 in Las Vegas.
"What's up with Detroit?"		August 13, 2013	26
Michigan city has lost people, money and jobs. Stossel looks at some of the reasons why and a possible solution to save the Motor City.
"Summer Myths"		August 16, 2013	27
Stossel and guests look closely at summer myths about storms, sharks, bees and wildfires and determine whether they're true or not.
"Battle of the Sexes"		August 29, 2013	28
Stossel and guests duke it out over gender inequality in the workplace, social settings, education and sports.
"The Police State"		September 6, 2013	29
Stossel and guests look at the increasingly aggressive techniques used by law enforcement. Also, a look at the use of swat raids, drones and the NSA.
"The World's Police"		September 25, 2013	30
Does the U.S. need to act as the world's police? Stossel and guests debate a military strike against Syria, the politics of war and to what extent foreign aid helps poor nations.
"Innovation Nation"		October 7, 2013	31
Guests offer a glimpse into the future by explaining new technologies like digital currencies, private space travel and space colonies.
"Escaping the Education Blob"		October 15, 2013	32
Repeat of Sept 26, 2013 episode.
"Just Shut it."		October 3, 2013	33
Who's afraid of the government shutdown? Not Stossel. He'll explain why they should 'just shut it'.
"Selling Victimhood"		October 10, 2013	34
Do some entitlements kill ambition? Stossel and guests analyze programs like food stamps, welfare and disability insurance.
"17,000,000,000,000 Problems"		October 17, 2013	35
Stossel asks people how they feel about government spending and the national debt.
"Fed up"		October 24, 2013	36
Stossel and guests cover the history of the Federal Reserve and debate the United States's need for a central bank.
"Obamascare"		October 31, 2013	37
A look at the bigger problems surrounding Obamacare.
"Privatize Everything"		November 7, 2013	38
Stossel and guests compare the efficiency of privately and publicly run institutions.
"Rise of Libertarians"		November 21, 2013	40
A look at the growing popularity of the movement's ideas and politics.
"Real Charity"		November 21, 2013	41
Stossel and guests compare private vs. government charity and look at innovative ways to help those in need.
"I Play One on TV"		December 5, 2013	42
Stossel and guests examine apparent hypocrisy in Hollywood. Guess include actor Kevin Sorbo.
"Defending the Market"		December 12, 2013	43
An atypical look at capitalism and its benefits to the world. Guests discuss the difference between true capitalism and crony capitalism. Also, Stossel looks at why some countries become rich while some remain poor.

=== Season 5: 2014 ===
Title	Guest(s)	Airdate	Ep. #
"Equality vs. Liberty"		January 9, 2014	1
Stossel questions whether it is unfair that some people make more money than others, and looks at the issue of income inequality.
"Chill Out"		January 23, 2014	2
Stossel and guests debate whether or not humanity is doomed by climate change.
"State of the Union Response"		January 28, 2014	3
Stossel and panel analyze the 2014 State of the Union address.
"Reputation is Everything"		February 6, 2014	4
Stossel argues why reputation is better for the country than rules and regulations from the government.
"Stossel U"		February 20, 2014	5
Special edition of the program hosted at the Student's For Liberty Conference in Washington, D.C.
"Battle of the Ages"		February 27, 2014	6
Stossel interviews fellow baby boomers and younger generations about entitlements, culture and Miley Cyrus.
"Hey, Big Spender"		March 6, 2014	7
With the new budget being released, Stossel breaks down how government plans to spend more of Americans' money.
"War on Women?"		March 13, 2014	8
Stossel and guests debate whether or not there really is a battle being waged against females.
"Spring Cleaning"		March 20, 2014	9
In keeping with spring cleaning Stossel proposes to clean waste, starting with bloat and waste in government.
"Government Bullies"		March 27, 2014	10
Stossel and guest discuss how government uses its force to push people around and take their belongings.
"Want to Bet?"		April 3, 2014	11
Gambling: What's right, what's wrong and what's legal
"Taxing Time"		April 10, 2014	12
Stossel and guests examine why is US tax law so complicated and confusing, and discuss better solutions.
"A Practical Earth Day"		April 17, 2014	13
Stossel and guests discuss real ways to help the environment.
"They Know What You Do"		April 24, 2014	14
Stossel and guests look at the pros and cons of technology and how it affects your privacy.
"You Can't Say That"		May 1, 2014	15
Stossel and guests look at recent examples of free speech being squelched.
"Risky Business"		May 8, 2014	16
Entrepreneurs join Stossel to discuss how government regulations affect business creation.
"Dearly Beloved"		May 15, 2014	17
A look at marriage, divorce and changes in family dynamics over time
"The Good New Days"		May 22, 2014	18
Bad stories always lead the news, but Stossel and guests point out all the good things happening around the world, and highlight the tremendous progress society has made.
"Food Fight"		May 29, 2014	19
Stossel and guests debate whether or not the hype about GMOs, fat and school lunches is well-founded.
"Popular Nonsense"		June 5, 2014	20
Stossel and guests break down things in economics, education and Hollywood that confuse the public.
"Libertarians vs Conservatives"		June 12, 2014	21
A showdown between two schools of political thought on drugs, marriage and the military
"New World Inventions"		June 19, 2014	22
A look at amazing, and sometimes scary, innovations on the horizon
"Crapitalism"		June 26, 2014	23
Stossel takes on crony capitalism and the Export-Import Bank.
"Breaking…News?"		July 10, 2014	24
Stossel and guests look at the state of the media.
"Big Brother"		July 17, 2014	25
A special edition of the program at Freedomfest in Las Vegas
"Buried In Law"		July 24, 2014	26
Stossel and guests look at problems with the legal system. Also, this year's 'Wacky Warning Label' contest winner is announced.
"Let us Experiment"		July 31, 2014	27
Stossel and his family members talk about out-of-the-ordinary things they have tried.
"The Riot Police"		August 21, 2014	28
Ferguson, MO: A look at what caused the problem and some solutions to prevent further conflict.
"The Green Monster"		August 28, 2014	29
Stossel and guests debate whether the EPA has gone too far with regulations.
"Back to School"		September 4, 2014	30
Stossel and guests discuss the problems of central planning as it relates to both public education and college costs. Guests include porn star Belle Knox.
"Combating Terror"		September 11, 2014	31
"They're Coming to America"		September 18, 2014	32
Stossel and guests look at immigration's impact on American culture.
"Give Me a...Choice"		September 25, 2014	33
Stossel looks at how the power of choice can apply to elections. Topics include the health insurance mandate, "right to try" laws, and whether either major party is even about choice.
"It's a Mean, Mean World?"		October 2, 2014	34
Stossel looks at whether the world is as mean as the media make it out to be. He also looks at the hypocrisy of pro-gun control celebrities.
"Spread the Wealth"		October 9, 2014	35
Stossel and guests look at whether wealth is better spread through individual charity and economic freedom, or government regulations.
