= International entrepreneur rule =

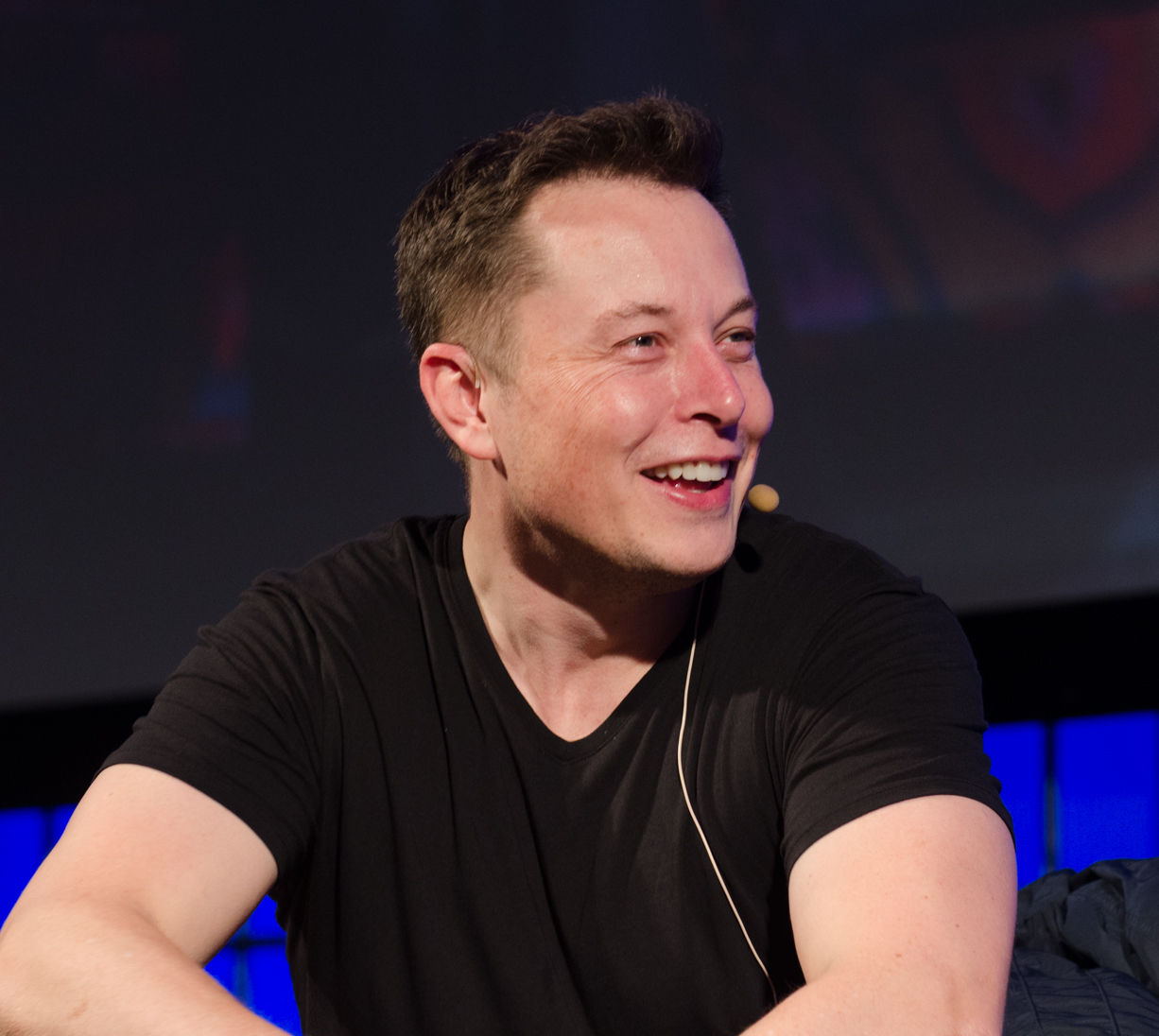
Elon Musk, South-African Founder of SpaceX and CEO of Tesla Motors

The International Entrepreneur Rule is a regulation by U.S. Citizenship and Immigration Services (USCIS) to increase the presence of foreign entrepreneurship in the U.S. Under this rule, qualified foreign entrepreneurs are granted temporary parole to the U.S. in order to build and scale their businesses. Foreign entrepreneurs wishing to enter or remain in the country to build their business operations must meet certain criteria that are reviewed on a case-by-case basis by the Department of Homeland Security (DHS). Unlike the Startup Visa, this rule does not need to be approved by Congress. The American public was allowed to comment on the proposed rule for 45 days, and the final rule was published in January 2017 and implemented in December 2017 after a federal court order. The Department of Homeland Security estimates that 2,940 entrepreneurs will be granted parole to the U.S. each year.

== Background – The impact of foreign entrepreneurs in the U.S. economy ==
León Rodríguez, Director of U.S. Citizenship and Immigration Services at the time the International Entrepreneur Rule was published, stated, “America’s economy has long benefitted from the contributions of immigrant entrepreneurs, from Main Street to Silicon Valley”. Historically, immigrant entrepreneurs have played a pivotal role in developing the U.S. economy, particularly in the technology sector. In the years 1998–2006, 14.76% of all patent applications in the United States had at least one immigrant involved as a lone or co-founder, with the majority of these patents having roots in California and New Jersey. In all American technology and engineering businesses created in the U.S. between 1995 and 2005, one-quarter of them had an immigrant as a key founder. In 2012, immigrant tech-founded companies employed over 550,000 people and generated close to 70 billion dollars in sales. Over 40% of current Fortune 500 companies were established by immigrants or children of immigrants. President Obama's last State of the Union Address summarized the importance of international entrepreneurs in the US: “America is every immigrant and entrepreneur from Boston to Austin to Silicon Valley, racing to shape a better world. That’s who we are.”

== Initial parole requirements ==
A foreign entrepreneur that wishes to remain in or enter the U.S. for the first time to establish their business can submit their parole application to USCIS for review. Applications will be reviewed on a case-by-case basis. Entrepreneurs that meet the criteria may be granted a stay of 30 months to run their companies in the U.S. This temporary legal stay in the country, or "parole," falls under the same umbrella that is already applied to court witnesses and certain other individuals living outside the U.S. Foreigners are allowed to enter the U.S. on “urgent humanitarian” needs, or in the case of “significant public benefit”. The requirements for the entrepreneurs which will equate to the potential of significant public benefit are as follows:

1. Must own at least 10% of the startup and play a prominent role in the startup's operations.
2. The entrepreneur's startup must have been formed in the U.S. in the preceding five years before applying.
3. The startup displays the potential to have accelerated growth and benefit the U.S. economy with the creation of jobs. This potential is indicated by:
- "Receiving significant investment of capital (at least $250,000) from certain qualified U.S. investors with established records of successful investments in the 18 months before applying."
- "Receiving significant awards or grants (at least $100,000) from certain federal, state or local government entities."
- "Partially satisfying one or both of the above criteria in addition to other reliable and compelling evidence of the startup entity’s substantial potential for rapid growth and job creation."

== Re-parole requirements ==
Founders granted the initial 30 months of parole will have the opportunity to extend their stay in the United States for up to 30 additional months. The company's progress as judged by its investment, job creation and revenue numbers will be the determining factors which will decide whether the additional parole will be granted or not.

== Initial limitations of the International Entrepreneur Rule ==
Startups run by immigrant entrepreneurs on a parole status will have hurdles to overcome that startups run by legal U.S. residents will never encounter. Five years (2.5 years of initial parole with the 2.5 years additional granted) is not a very long period of time in terms of startups. IPO-track startups take typically seven years to exit, with many taking over a decade. The first two years are extremely important and will increase founders’ pressure to achieve high growth in the first two years. This could negatively impact business operations and put these startups at a potential disadvantage to American-founded companies. The investment requirements will also present a potential hurdle for the entrepreneurs. $250,000 is a considerable investment sum. The rule also seems to place more importance on investment generated than revenue generated, at least during the initial parole period. Many companies are able to self-fund through revenue, but would likely fall short on the investment side of the rule. Another potential challenge is that currently in the U.S., the fastest growing firms tend to turn to personal savings and banking loans to finance their operations, and these sources of funding are not mentioned explicitly in the rule's criteria.

On another note, as this rule only grants the founder parole status, leaving the country poses the founder at a risk of not being able to reenter the country. The government officials at the border entry point will be responsible for making that decision.

== Litigation and implementation ==
The International Entrepreneur Rule was published in the Federal Register at the end of the Obama administration, three days before President Donald Trump was inaugurated. The rule was scheduled to go into effect six months later, on July 17, 2017, but on July 11, 2017, USCIS published a new rule with the effect of delaying this effective date until March 2018. In the lawsuit National Venture Capital Assn, et al. v. Duke, et al., the NVCA and other plaintiffs challenged this delay rule as unlawful under the Administrative Procedure Act. On December 1, 2017, the federal district court for the District of Columbia granted summary judgment for the plaintiffs in this case, and ordered USCIS to implement the International Entrepreneur Rule without further delay. Two weeks later, USCIS published forms and instructions for founders seeking to apply for entrepreneur parole and began accepting applications, but stated that "[w]hile DHS complies with the court order and implements the IER parole program, DHS is also in the final stages of publishing a notice of proposed rulemaking seeking to remove the IER."
