= Max Marty =

American entrepreneur (born 1983/84)

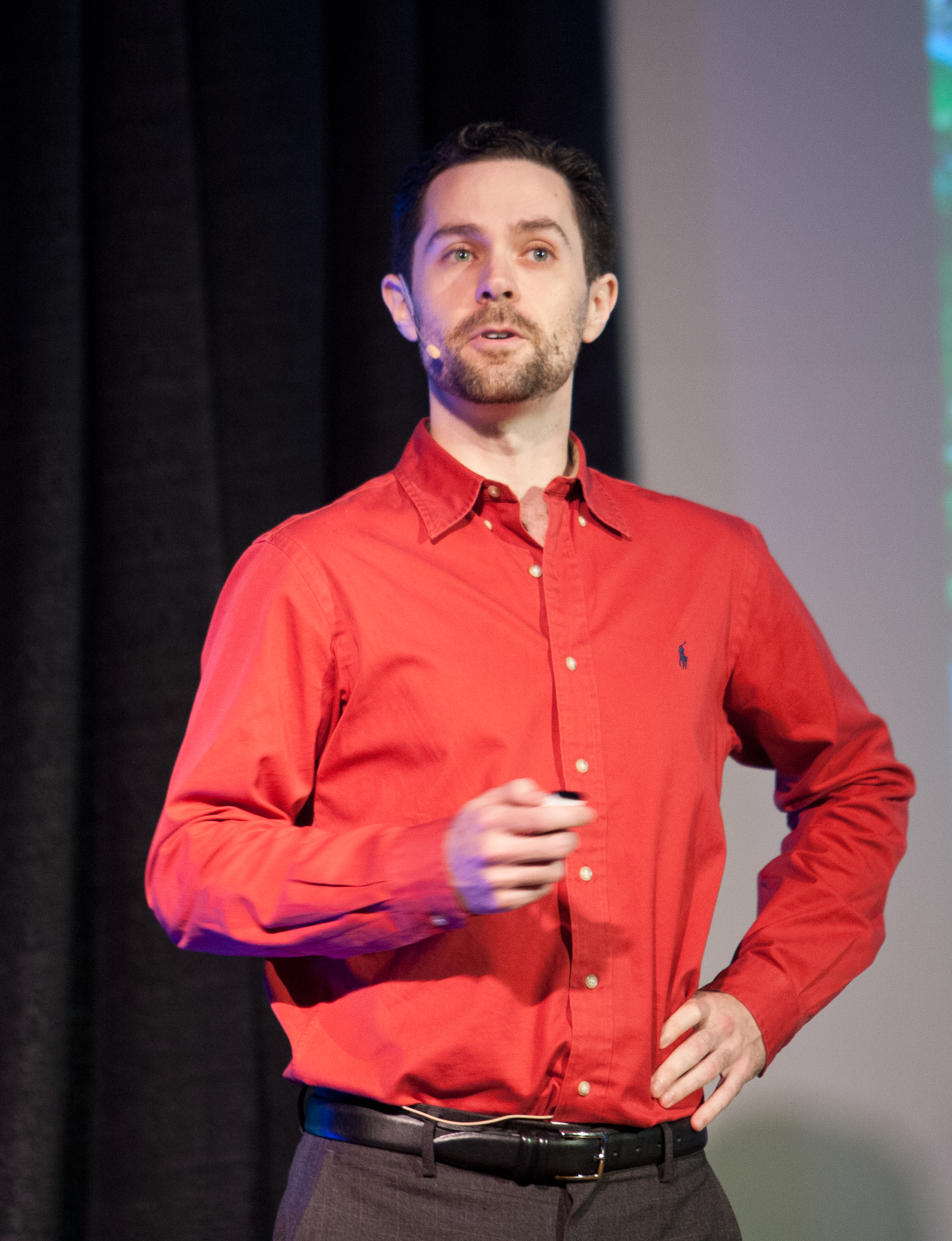
- Marty presents Blueseed at TEDx Monterey, April 2012.
- Born: 1983 or 1984 (age 41–42)
- Education: Muhlenberg College; B.A., Global Political Economy & Philosophy; University of Miami; MBA
- Occupation: Entrepreneur
- Known for: Co-founder of Blueseed

Max Marty is an American entrepreneur based in Silicon Valley, who co-founded the seed accelerator project Blueseed with Dario Mutabdzija and Dan Dascalescu. He was previously Director of Business Strategy at The Seasteading Institute.

== Early life and education ==
Marty was born in Florida of Cuban political refugees. He graduated from Muhlenberg College with a B.S. in Global Political Economy and Philosophy. Later, he obtained an MBA from the University of Miami.

== Career ==
Blueseed is a startup community project that Marty co-founded in July 2011 with Seasteading Institute colleague Dario Mutabdzija and seasteading ambassador Dan Dascalescu. The project is preparing to launch a ship near Silicon Valley to serve as a startup community and entrepreneurial incubator without United States work visa requirements. The platform is set to offer living and office space, high-speed Internet connectivity, and regular ferry service to the mainland. The existence of the project is due to the lack of U.S. visas for entrepreneurs. Instead, customers will use the much easier to obtain B-1/B-2 visas to travel to the mainland, while work will be done exclusively on the ship.

On July 31, 2013, Marty announced he was stepping back from day-to-day operations at Blueseed and taking on the role of Chairman of the Board of Directors.

== Appearances ==
Marty's first television appearances were in December 2011, on the After the Bell show with Liz Claman and David Asman and on the Stossel Show with John Stossel. On April 13, 2012, Marty presented Blueseed at TEDx Monterey. He was later interviewed by Richard Quest for CNN International, Melissa Francis for Fox Business and Jeff Glor for CBS This Morning. In November 2011, he spoke on Big Picture Science with Seth Shostak.

== Personal life ==
Marty said he would like to live in a society close to minarchism and if he weren't working in Blueseed, he would pursue radical but practical innovation in education, telecommunications, augmented reality, and clothing.

Marty is signed up for cryonics and runs the Cryonics Underground podcast.
