= Dario Mutabdzija =

Bosnian-American entrepreneur (born 1979/80)

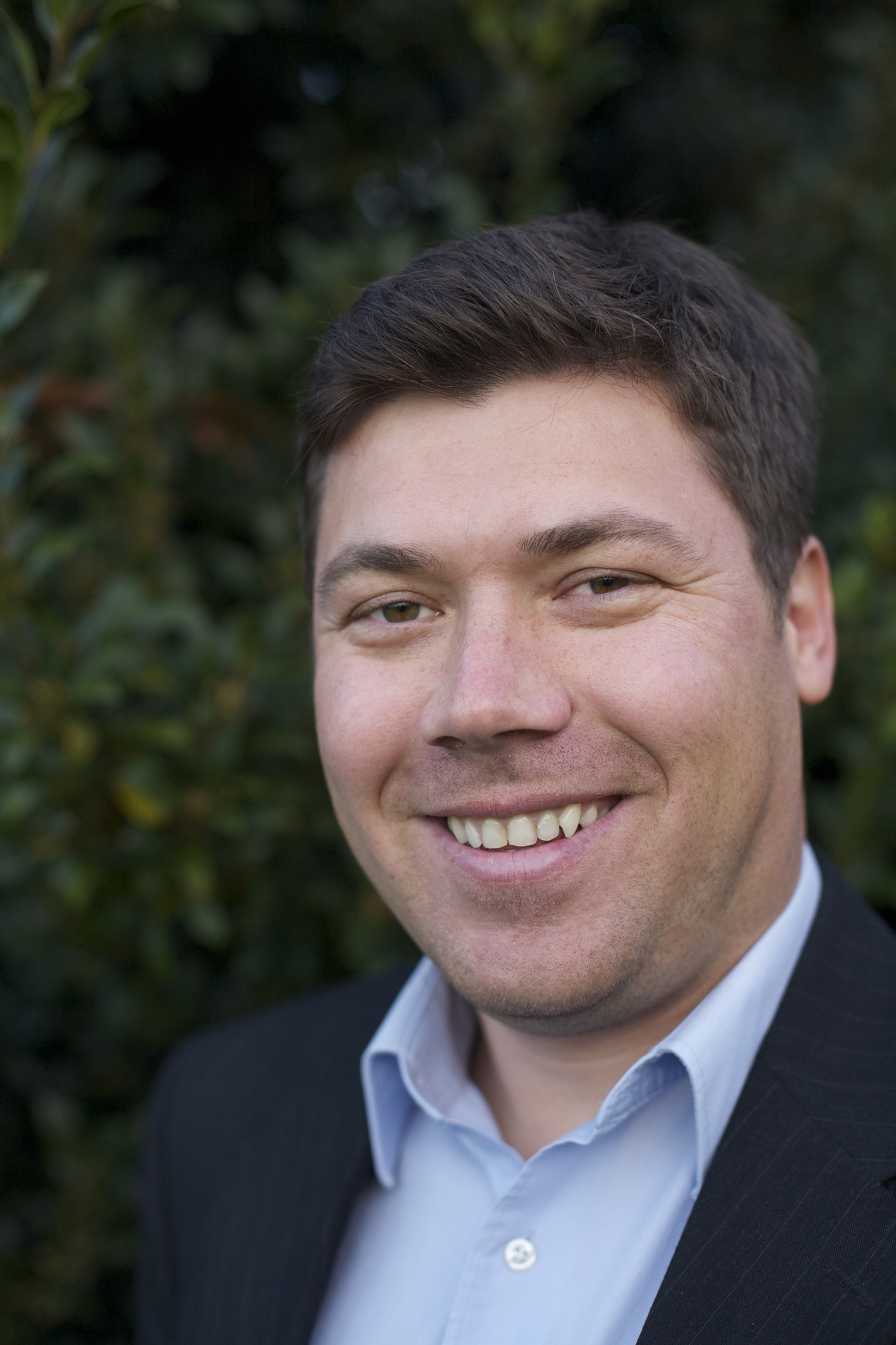
- Mutabdzija, Co-founder and President, Blueseed, Inc.
- Born: 1979 or 1980 (age 45–46); Sarajevo, Bosnia and Herzegovina
- Education: McGeorge School of Law, University of Salzburg; JD '08 and LL.M. '09, Transnational Business Practice; University of Hawaii at Hilo, BA Communications
- Occupation: Entrepreneur
- Known for: Blueseed

Dario Mutabdzija is an American entrepreneur based in Silicon Valley, who co-founded the seed accelerator project Blueseed. He was previously Director of Legal Strategy at The Seasteading Institute. He is now head of business development at Israeli startup PayKey.

== Biography ==
Mutabdzija was born in Sarajevo and immigrated in the United States with his family in the 1990s due to the breakout of the Bosnian War. He graduated from University of Hawaii at Hilo with a B.S. in Communications. In 2008, he obtained a JD from the McGeorge School of Law in Sacramento, and in 2009 a joint LL.M. in Transnational Business Practice from the same school and the University of Salzburg, Austria. Prior to The Seasteading Institute, he interned at the Vienna office of multinational law firm Freshfields Bruckhaus Deringer.

== Blueseed ==
Blueseed is a startup community project that Mutabdzija co-founded in July 2011 with Seasteading Institute colleague Max Marty. The project is preparing to launch a ship near Silicon Valley to serve as a startup community and entrepreneurial incubator without United States work visa requirements. The platform is set to offer living and office space, high-speed Internet connectivity, and regular ferry service to the mainland. The existence of the project is due to the lack of U.S. visas for entrepreneurs. Instead, customers will use the much easier to obtain B-1/B-2 visas to travel to the mainland, while work will be done exclusively on the ship.

== Appearances ==
Mutabdzija's first television appearances were in December 2011, on the Stossel Show with John Stossel. and on Fox Business in an interview with Shibani Joshi.

Later, he was interviewed about Blueseed on the BBC, on Charlie Rose's CBS This Morning by Jeff Glor, on CNN during the Erin Burnett OutFront show, and on First Business.
