= Operation Atlantis =

Unrecognized micronation

- Unrecognized micronation
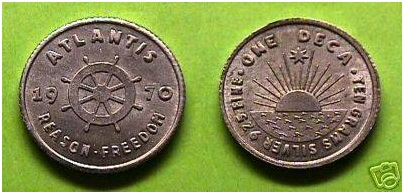
- Deca, the intended currency of Atlantis III
- Claimed by: Werner Stiefel
- Dates claimed: 1968–1973
- Area claimed: Attempted sea platform at Silver Shoals Cays, Caribbean Sea

Operation Atlantis was a project started by Werner Stiefel in 1968 that tried to establish a new libertarian nation in international waters. The operation launched a ferro-cement boat on the Hudson River in December 1971 and piloted it to an area near the Bahamas. Upon reaching its destination, it sank in a hurricane. After a number of subsequent failed attempts to construct a habitable sea platform and achieve sovereign status, the project was abandoned.

== Origin ==
Werner Stiefel was born in Brooklyn, New York, in 1921. In 1847, his family established a soap manufacturing business in what later became Germany. His father moved to America in 1910 to establish a new subsidiary of the company, but World War II put the entire company out of business. In 1947, Stiefel, his father, and his brother set up a new business in the United States, Stiefel Medicinal Soap Company. As of 2006, Stiefel Laboratories was the largest privately owned dermatological company in the world, with over 2,500 employees and offices in more than 100 countries. Werner remained president and CEO until his retirement in 2001.

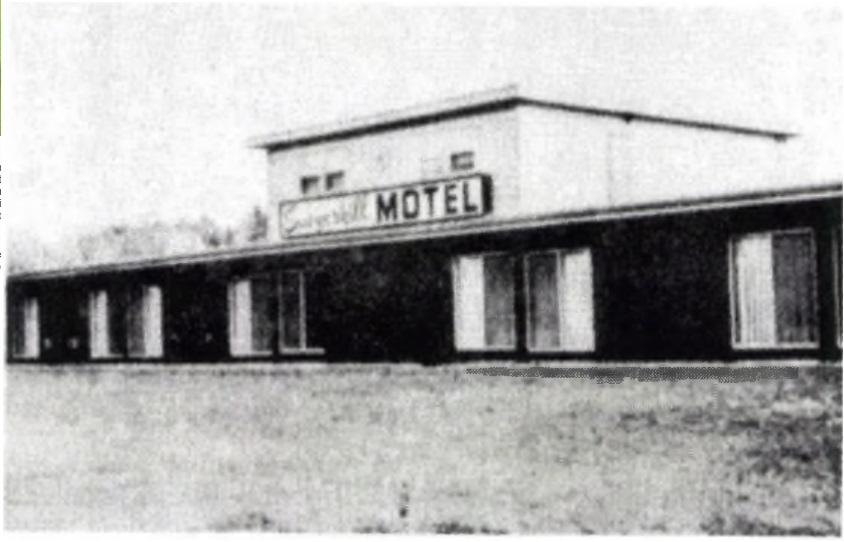
The Sawyerkill Motel in Saugerties, New York (1968)

He was inspired by the works of Ayn Rand, particularly Atlas Shrugged. Despite his relative liberty in the United States, Stiefel was convinced that postwar America was on the same road to socialism which had strangled free enterprise in Europe and Asia. To preserve his own liberty and that of other like-minded and capable people, Stiefel sought to "test the hypothesis that a free, capitalist society can exist and flourish in today's world" by physically building a libertarian nation in the Caribbean. Operation Atlantis was thus born.

=== The Plan ===
1. Gather Libertarians in a single location where they can work together to build an integrated community (Motel = Atlantis I).
2. Acquire an ocean vessel and declare it to be an independent craft sailing under the flag of this new country while in international waters (Ship = Atlantis II).
3. Using this vessel and possibly an island, create a sovereign country as close to U.S. shores as possible (Ship + Island = Atlantis III).

== Starting a community – Atlantis I (1968–70) ==
His first move was to form the Atlantis Development Company, under which he would purchase the land and equipment necessary for the construction of a new country. Operating out of the Sawyerkill Motel in Saugerties, New York, near one of his soap-making plants, Stiefel began assembling a team of enthusiastic young libertarians. In order to attract individuals from across the United States, he wrote The Story of Operation Atlantis under the pseudonym Warren K. Stevens, and published it via his own Atlantis Publishing Company. The book was a call to action for entrepreneurial libertarians to seek an exit from established states and build a polity based on liberty.

In March 1969, Stiefel traveled to the Caribbean in search of a base for Operation Atlantis. In his monthly bulletin, The Atlantis News, Stiefel announced a promising location known as the Prickly Pear Cays in the Leeward Islands. These seamounts were owned by the Anguillan government, which declined to sell them to Atlantis.

As the community at the motel steadily grew, Stiefel continued his search. By the spring of 1970, the Atlanteans settled on the Silver Shoals Cays, claimed by both Haiti and the Bahamas, as a suitable location for a shoal landfill and a habitable sea platform. By May of that year, Stiefel visited the region to take aerial photos and plan the settlement.

== Building Atlantis II (1970–71) ==
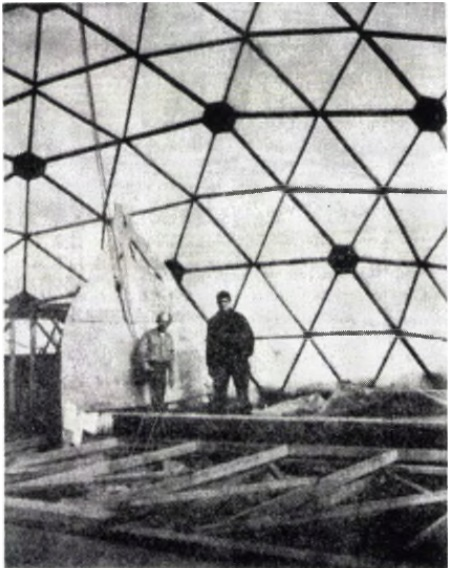
Atlanteans under the geodesic dome during the construction of Atlantis II (1970)

By the end of summer 1970, Stiefel and the Atlantis community were satisfied with the choice of Silver Shoals for Atlantis III. They were ready to begin phase two of their plan, and proceeded to ready the materials for the construction of a ferrocement seagoing vessel, Atlantis II. Under a geodesic dome next to the motel to protect their construction site from the elements, building the 38-foot (12 m) ship occupied the members of Operation Atlantis for a full year. With the aid of independent contractors, Atlantis II was finally completed in December 1971.

== Atlantis III and decline (1971–73) ==
Once Atlantis II was finished, Stiefel and the Atlanteans were eager to launch the craft before the Hudson River froze for the winter. The ferrocement boat was launched into the river at high tide, but as the tide receded, the boat capsized and lay sideways in the mud. A kerosene lamp also broke inside and partially ruined the interior. But the concrete and steel hull survived, and the boat began its voyage down the east coast of the U.S. towards Silver Shoals. After a number of mishaps, including a broken propeller shaft, Atlantis II was able to reach the Bahamas. This success did not last, however, as a hurricane caused the boat to sink soon after.

Despite this loss, the members of Operation Atlantis did not quit. Stiefel bought a new boat and moved the Operation to Tortuga Island, where the Atlanteans prepared to build Silver Shoals into dry land. The Haitian government was highly suspicious of their plans, and Operation Atlantis was subsequently driven off Tortuga and forced to advance its construction of Atlantis III at Silver Shoals. After dredging sand for a new island and recovering silver coins from a nearby shipwreck, they had high hopes that Stiefel's dream for a libertarian polity might soon be real.

Nevertheless, operating on local reports that pirates were diving for shipwrecks in the area, a Haitian gunboat happened upon Atlantis' construction site. Mistaking them for robbers, its captain ordered the Atlanteans to leave or be shot. With no arms to defend themselves and not seeking an international incident, Stiefel and his allies were forced to abandon Silver Shoals.

After this fiasco, most of Operation Atlantis' members returned to the United States. To revive the project, Stiefel purchased an oil rig which he planned to tow and deposit at the Misteriosa Banks between Honduras and Cuba. Like the others, this craft failed when it was blown out to sea by a hurricane and destroyed. Stiefel's final attempt to create a libertarian nation was to buy an island off the coast of Belize with the intention of gaining freeport status from the Belizean government. Finally, growing old and tired of working with the bureaucracy, he put the island up for sale. This marked the end of Operation Atlantis.

== See also ==
- Heathian anarchism
- Minarchism
- Ocean colonization
- Seasteading
