= Opus Casino =

Spanish Cruiseferry

History
- Name: Opus Casino
- Owner
- Builder: Unión Naval de Levante
- Yard number: 152
- Completed: 1985
- Identification: IMO number: 8409056
- Status: for charter/sale

General characteristics
- Tonnage: 2,040 GT
- Displacement: 1233 tonnes
- Length: 67.70 metres (222.1 ft)
- Beam: 10.61 metres (34.8 ft)
- Installed power: Two 12-cylinder, Alpha/Echevaaria Burmeister and Waine diesel engines (12V23LU); 3720 HP, 1370 kW
- Propulsion: Two propellers
- Speed: 17 kn (31.48 km/h)
- Capacity: 250 passengers, 43 cars

Opus Casino (formerly Liquid Vegas, Royal Star, Liberty II, Liberty I, Royal Empress, Punta Pedrera) is a cruiseferry built in 1985 in Valencia, Spain for Marítima de Formentera SA, to handle traffic between Ibiza and Formentera. In July 2012, the vessel was donated to The Seasteading Institute, and is currently available for bareboat charter or sale, preferably to businesses that could support experimentation with long-term ocean habitation.

== History ==
A 1986 incident required expensive repairs. In 1993, the vessel was sold to Helton Limited. In 1995, she was sold to Adventure Holdings Corp. (Kingstown) and commenced duty as a casino ship near Florida under the name Royal Empress. In 2004, she was sold to Royal Star.

In fall 2009, the vessel owner at the time, Las Vegas Casino Lines, LLC, declared bankruptcy and Liquid Vegas was sold at auction on October 29, 2009, by the Canaveral Port Authority. The winning bid was US$2,060,000 by The Mermaid I, LLC.

The ship is currently classified through Registro Italiano Navale.
