= Rhea Fairbairn =

Canadian tennis player

- Born: 15 January 1890; Toronto, Ontario, Canada
- Died: 24 April 1953 (age 63); Fort Thomas, Kentucky, U.S.
- Known for: Tennis player
- Spouse: Frank Marty

Rhea Fairbairn Marty (15 January 1890 – 24 April 1953) was a Canadian-American amateur tennis player, active in the early 20th century.

== Tennis career ==
Fairbairn, who was a member of the tennis team at the University of Toronto, reached the finals of the Canadian Championships in 1910. She finished runner-up to Lois Moyes, losing 4–6, 0–6.

At the Cincinnati Open, Fairbairn was a singles finalist in 1910, losing to Miriam Steever, and won the doubles title in 1913 (with Helen McLaughlin).

Fairbairn competed in the 1911 Ohio state tournament, and reached the singles final in 1912 and 1915, falling to Canadian Tennis Hall of Fame inductee Lois Moyes both times.

== Personal life ==
Fairbairn married fellow athlete Frank Curry Marty of Fort Thomas, Kentucky, in 1912. They had two daughters, Lois and Doris. Her husband, who was a president of a paper company and a college-level baseball and football coach, died in 1950, and she died on April 24, 1953, at the age of 63, in Fort Thomas.
