= Frank Marty =

American football player and coach (1889–1950)

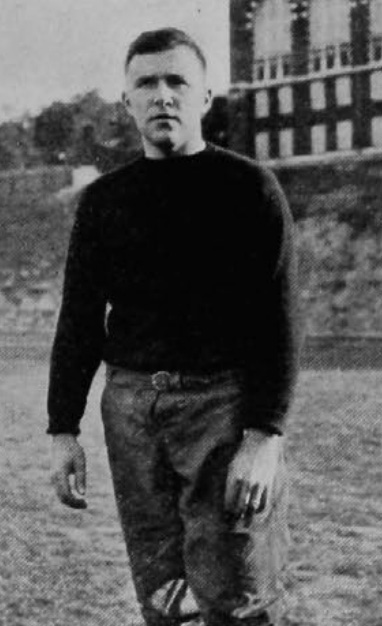
- Marty pictured in The Cincinnatian 1918, Cincinnati yearbook

Biographical details
- Born: November 12, 1889; Cincinnati, Ohio, U.S.
- Died: August 6, 1950 (aged 61); Fort Thomas, Kentucky, U.S.

Playing career
- 1910: Kenyon

Coaching career (HC unless noted)
- 1917: Cincinnati

Head coaching record
- Overall: 0–6

Francis Curry Marty (November 12, 1889 – August 6, 1950) was an American college football player and coach. He served as the head football coach at the University of Cincinnati for one season, in 1917, compiling a record of 0–6. Marty also played golf and tennis. He was later president of the General Paper Corporation.

Marty was born on November 12, 1889, in Cincinnati. He married Canadian tennis player Rhea Fairbairn in 1912; they had two daughters, Lois and Doris. He died of a heart attack on August 6, 1950, at his home in Fort Thomas, Kentucky.

== Head coaching record ==
Year	Team	Overall	Conference	Standing	Bowl/playoffs
Cincinnati Bearcats (Ohio Athletic Conference) (1917)
1917	Cincinnati	0–6	0–4	T–13th	
Cincinnati:		0–6	0–4		
Total:		0–6			
