= Blueseed =

Startup company based on a proposed seasteading venture

Coordinates: 37.4°N 122.8°W

Blueseed Inc.
- Type: Private
- Genre: Startup incubator
- Founded: July 31, 2011 (incorporated March 29, 2012 as Blueseed, Inc.)
- Founder: Max Marty; Dario Mutabdzija; Dan Dascalescu
- Headquarters: Palo Alto, California
- Key people: Dan Dascalescu (COO); Dario Mutabdzija (President); Max Marty (Chairman of the Board of Directors)
- Number of employees: 30
- Website: blueseed.com

Blueseed is a Palo Alto, California-based startup accelerator. It began as a seasteading venture.

The original idea of Blueseed was to create a startup community located on a vessel stationed in international waters near the coast of Silicon Valley in the United States. The initial intended location (outside the territorial seas of the United States, 12 nautical miles (24 kilometers) from the coast of California, in the so-called "contiguous zone") would enable non-U.S. startup entrepreneurs to work on their ventures without the need for a US work visa (H1B), while living in proximity to Silicon Valley and using relatively easier to obtain business and tourism visas (B1/B2) to travel to the mainland.

The project received wide media coverage and the promise of funding from venture capitalist Peter Thiel, who also supports the Seasteading Institute, who ultimately did not invest in the seed round. Blueseed later obtained US$300,000 in seed funding, Bitcoin investments, and $9M from an undisclosed investor, and claimed plans to lease a ship for its platform. The launch was planned for summer 2014, assuming that $18M more would be raised.

Blueseed went on hold due to insufficient funding in 2013, but later resumed services in 2020 after raising funds from investors. Moreover, the board decided to abandon the initial seaseeding venture in other to focus as a business incubator establishing its headquarters in California. Since then the company has spent over $10M in seed funding to develop startups. The company also give out grant to startups both within and outside the United States. It has also led a lot of serial funding for startups who are willing to scale up.

== History ==
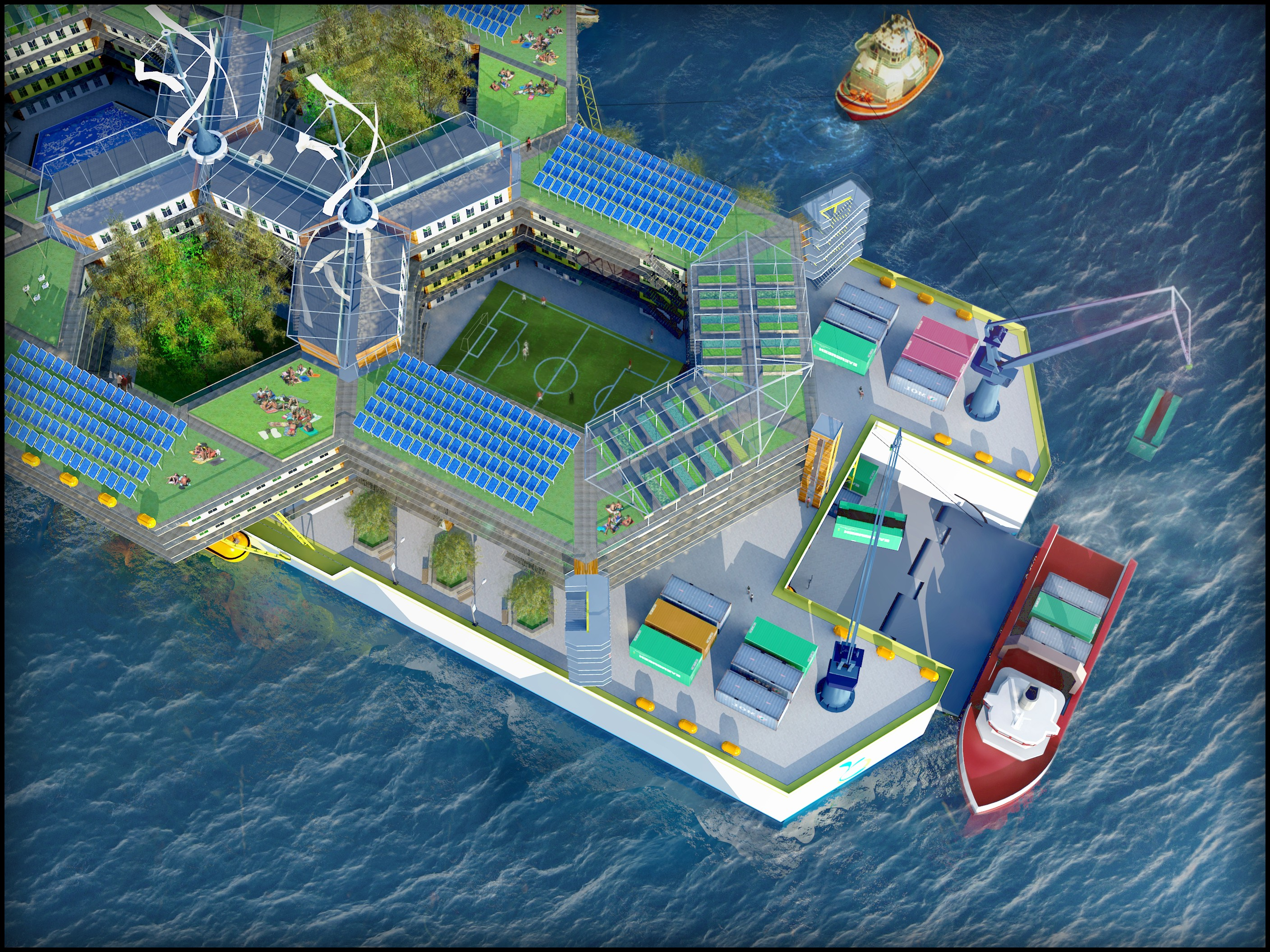
Concept art of a Blueseed "hive"

Blueseed was co-founded in July 2011 by Max Marty and Dario Mutabdzija, who had worked together at The Seasteading Institute as Directors of Business Strategy and Legal Strategy, respectively. Blueseed's CIO/CTO (later COO), Dan Dascalescu, who joined the company shortly after its incorporation, is also an ambassador for the Seasteading Institute.

The stated motivations of the project included providing an entrepreneurial alternative to the Startup Visa Act and creating "a vibrant workplace for innovative industries to bloom, unencumbered by onerous regulations on new technology-sector businesses".

On November 30, 2011, venture capitalist Peter Thiel offered to lead Blueseed's seed financing round. The number of startups that expressed interest in locating on Blueseed grew from 31 on November 14, 2011, to 60 a month later, to over 100 by February 2012, 133 on May 7, 194 as of May 9, and 336 on December 13, 2012.

In March 2013, Blueseed announced the project's launch cost to be $27M, of which $9M was reserved for an existing investor.

On July 31, 2013, two years after its founding, Blueseed co-founder Marty announced that he was stepping down from his day-to-day activities at the company and taking the role of Chairman of the Board of Directors. Dascalescu, the erstwhile CIO/CTO, became the COO of Blueseed, while Mutabdzija took the role of CEO.

Blueseed originally estimated a launch timeframe of Q3 2013. It revised its launch estimate to Q3-Q4 2014.

The project was put on hold due to lack of funding.

== Origins of the idea ==
Blueseed co-founder Marty claims that the idea of Blueseed came to him while on a Reason Cruise in February 2011.

A Los Angeles Times article about Blueseed noted that another company called SeaCode, led by Roger Green and David Cook, had attempted something similar in the past but had to put the project aside because they were unable to raise enough money to launch.

== Logistics ==
Blueseed planned to either convert a cruise ship or remodel a barge in order to provide living accommodations, coworking space, and entertainment facilities for approximately 1,000 customers paying an average of USD 1500 in monthly rent (ranging between $1200 and $3000, and combined with a small equity stake). The vessel would be stationed 12 nautical miles from the coast of California, near the port of Half Moon Bay, and would have a crew of 200-300. The location was to be situated outside the territorial waters of the United States of America; the founders considered that it would thus not be subject to US immigration laws. Internet connectivity would have been provided via a point-to-point microwave link, submarine communications cable or a laser link.

== Legality ==
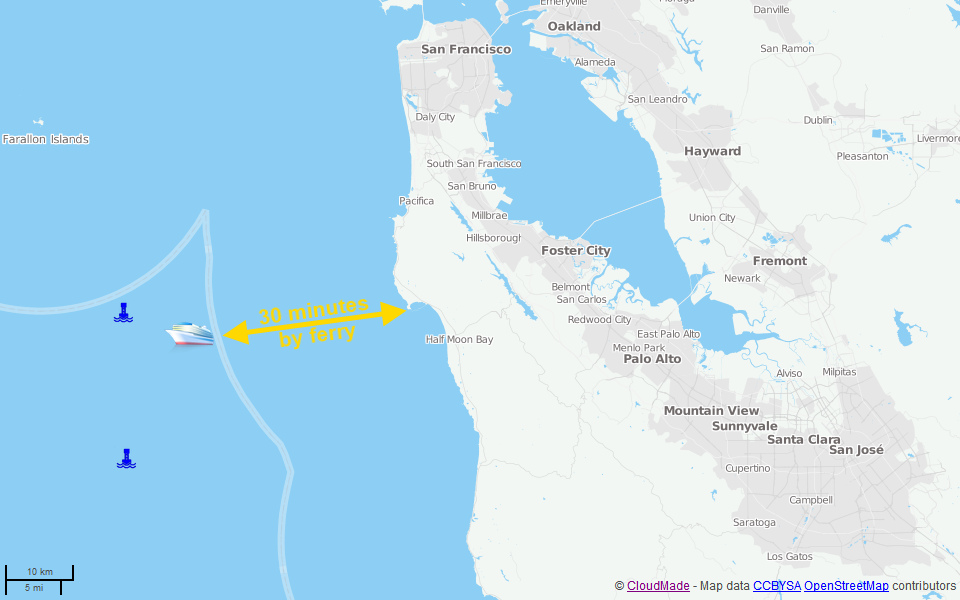
A map of Blueseed's planned sea platform (and two buoys for positioning) in relation to the California coast. Also shown on the map are Half Moon Bay (the closest port) and the Silicon Valley area ranging from San Francisco in the north to San Jose in the south. The thick white line is the boundary of the official territorial waters of the United States. The cusp is due to the presence of the Farallon Islands, over which the US exercises territorial control, located in the north-west part of the map.

The Blueseed ship planned to be stationed in the contiguous zone outside the territorial waters of the United States. The theory was that the United Nations Convention on the Law of the Sea would allow the ship to be present as long as it did not engage in the exploitation of natural resources, and exhibited no intent of infringing on the customs, fiscal, immigration or sanitary laws and regulations of the United States.

Following the precedent set by the cruise shipping industry, the Blueseed ship would have flown the flag of an open registry country such as Marshall Islands or The Bahamas, which would determine the de jure laws applying on board.

Businesses that are generally illegal in the United States, such as gambling or prostitution, would have been forbidden on the ship.

== Reception ==
Fox News anchor Melissa Francis called Blueseed a "genius idea".
