= David Marty (footballer) =

French footballer (born 1972)

Personal information
- Full name: David Marty
- Date of birth: March 27, 1972 (age 54)
- Place of birth: France
- Height: 1.74 m (5 ft 8 1/2 in)
- Position: Striker

Senior career*
Years	Team	Apps	(Gls)
1989–1995	Chamois Niortais	16	(1)
1995–1999	SO Romorantin	?	(?)
1999	Blois	?	(?)
- * Club domestic league appearances and goals

David Marty (born March 27, 1972) is a former professional footballer who played as a striker.
