= Novyye Sarty =

Novyye Sarty Новые Сарты
- Village
- Location within Bashkortostan Location within Russia
- Coordinates: 54°30′N 56°40′E
- Country: Russia
- Region: Bashkortostan
- District: Arkhangelsky District
- Time zone: UTC+5:00

Novyye Sarty (Russian: Новые Сарты; Bashkir: Яңы Һарт, Yañı Hart) is a rural locality (a village) in Lipovsky Selsoviet, Arkhangelsky District, Bashkortostan, Russia. The population was 28 as of 2010. There are 2 streets.

== Geography ==
Novyye Sarty is located 24 km northwest of Arkhangelskoye (the district's administrative centre) by road. Novochishma is the nearest rural locality.
