= Self-employment visa =

Temporary conditional residence permit in different countries

A self-employment visa (also known as an entrepreneur visa or startup visa) is a temporary conditional residence permit in different countries. It aims to introduce a visa category for entrepreneurs raising outside funding and converting to a permanent residency visa if certain conditions are met.

== By country ==
Self-employment visas by country
Country	Offers visa?	Program started	Duration of visa	Financial requirement	Ref
Australia	Yes				
Austria	Yes			€30,000	
Azerbaijan	Yes				
Belgium	Yes				
Bulgaria	Yes	2022		BGN 100,000	
Canada	Yes				
Chile	Yes		1 year		
Croatia	Yes				
Cyprus	Yes				
Czechia	Yes				
Denmark	Yes		2 years	153,240 kr.	
Estonia	Yes				
Finland	Yes		2 years		
France	Yes				
Germany	Yes				
Hong Kong	Yes		36 months		
Hungary	Yes				
Iceland	No	—N/a			
Ireland	Yes	2012		€50,000	
Italy	Yes	2014		€50,000	
Japan	Yes		6 months		
Latvia	Yes			€5,160	
Lithuania	Yes				
Luxembourg	Yes				
Malta	Yes			€25,000	
Netherlands	Yes				
New Zealand	Yes	2014	3 years	NZ$100,000	
Norway	No	—N/a			
Portugal	Yes				
San Marino	Yes				
Singapore	Yes			S$100,000	
Slovenia	Yes				
South Africa	Yes				
South Korea	Yes	2024			
Spain	Yes				
Sweden	Yes		2 years	200,000 kr	
Switzerland	Yes				
Taiwan	Yes	2015			
Turkey	Yes				
United Arab Emirates	Yes		5 years	AED 500,000	
United Kingdom	Yes				
United States	Yes				

=== Finland ===
The Finnish Startup Permit allows international growth entrepreneurs to build a startup company in Finland and become part of Finland's vibrant startup ecosystem. The permit is meant for innovative startup founders from countries outside the European Union. The permit can initially be issued for a maximum of two years, after which it can be renewed. The permit does not involve investments or financial support.
The permit requires:

- a startup team of not less than two founders with versatile expertise
- an intention of founding a fast-growth company in Finland
- an innovative business plan
- commitment to the business idea and eventually building the company
- significant holding in the company (For example, the team applying for the permit has a holding of not less than 60% of the company.)
- access to sufficient resources and funding for the company's early-stage development
- secure financial means for support

=== France ===
Currently, France does offer a resident permit called Compétences et talents (Competencies and Talents) that grants visas for entrepreneurs that "are likely to make a significant or lasting contribution, through their skills or talents, to France's economic development or to its intellectual, scientific, cultural, humanitarian or athletic prestige, and directly or indirectly, to that of their own country". This said, it is possible and often more accessible for entrepreneurs who want to start a company in Europe to come under the EU Blue Card or secondment route rather than apply for a Competencies and Talents resident permit.

A new entrepreneur route was launched in May 2015: the FrenchTech Ticket.

=== Germany ===
Applicants must show access to €500,000 in investment funds and that the business will create at least five job opportunities in Germany unless they are recent graduates from a German institution. Cooperation with the German Chamber of Industry and Commerce is required to succeed with the application.

=== Italy ===
In theory, there are two visa options available for entrepreneurs who want to start a business in Italy: a groundbreaking startup visa, which is reserved for innovative business ideas (see above), and a 'standard' self-employed visa (residence permit).

Migrant Entrepreneurs to Italy can also choose to enter the country via the 'standard' self-employed visa. This process requires the applicant to apply for a work permit (nulla osta) from within Italy. Therefore, the applicant must appoint an agent to complete the application in Italy. The minimum startup funds for this visa is a mere €4,962.36 but vary depending on the planned business, in contrast to the €50,000 investment required for the Italian Startup Visa. Nevertheless, the applicant must prove that there are no barriers to entry for their startup and, in essence, work closely with the Italian Chamber of Commerce to succeed with their application.

=== Netherlands ===
Startup founders are offered the startup visa - a one-year residence permit for the Netherlands - if they satisfy the following criteria:

- Collaboration with a reliable and experienced Netherlands-based facilitator.
- The product or the service is innovative.
- The startup entrepreneur has a (step-by-step) plan to move from idea to business.
- The startup entrepreneur and facilitator are registered in the Chamber of Commerce Trade Register.
- There are sufficient financial means (resources) to reside and live in the Netherlands (minimally 13000€).

After the year, the startup entrepreneur may be granted an extended residence permit if they satisfy the standard requirements for the Dutch government's self-employment scheme.

=== Spain ===
Entrepreneurs are offered a fast-tracked resident permit, requiring a government-vetted business plan, health insurance, and enough money to support themselves while living in Spain. Visa decisions are promised within ten working days, and residence permit decisions in 20 days.

=== United Kingdom ===
Entrepreneurs and startup founders are offered three visa options depending on their situation and the length of their stay. The Entrepreneur Visa, the Graduate Entrepreneur Visa, and the Prospective Entrepreneur Visa.

=== United States ===
In the U.S., the startup visa was a proposed amendment to the U.S. immigration law to create a visa category for foreign entrepreneurs who have raised capital from qualified American investors (Startup Visa Act of 2011, as introduced on 14 March 2011). The Startup Visa Act had bi-partisan support but was not passed into law.

==== Background ====
Foreign entrepreneurs who want to start a company in the United States have no or limited visa options. The few visas offering residency and thus a path to citizenship applicable to entrepreneurs are visa categories such as the EB-1 visa, or the EB-5 visa, which were not designed for entrepreneurs in particular, and can only apply to a minimal number of entrepreneurs. Employment-based visas, such as the EB-2 visa, are not viable options for entrepreneurs and can be denied if the applicant owns a significant stake in the sponsor company.

==== Requirements ====
The new legislation provides visas to the following groups under certain conditions:

1. Entrepreneurs living outside the U.S.—if a U.S. investor agrees to financially sponsor their entrepreneurial venture with a minimum investment of $100,000. Two years later, the startup must have created five new American jobs and raised over $500,000 in financing or generated more than $500,000 in yearly revenue.
2. Workers on an H-1B visa or graduates from U.S. universities in science, technology, engineering, mathematics, or computer science—if they have an annual income of at least $30,000 or assets of at least $60,000 and have had a U.S. investor commit investment of at least $20,000 in their venture. Two years later, the startup must have created three new American jobs and raised over $100,000 in financing or generated more than $100,000 in yearly revenue.
3. Foreign entrepreneurs whose businesses have generated at least $100,000 in sales from the U.S. Two years later, the startup must have created three new American jobs and either raised over $100,000 in financing or generated more than $100,000 in yearly revenue.

==== Use of existing visa numbers ====
The Startup Visa does not allocate any new visa numbers. Still, it draws from unused numbers out of the EB-5 visa category (investor green card), which is limited to 9,940 visas, of which only 4,191 visas were used in fiscal year 2009.

The office of Senator Lugar stressed the following statement: "The creation of new visas is not authorized in this bill."

In perspective, the United States admitted 1.13 million new legal permanent residents in 2009, of which only 12.7% were admitted through a selective process or "Employment-based" categories.

==== Legislative history ====
- The Startup Visa Act of 2010 was introduced in the Senate on 24 February 2010. It was left to expire in the Judiciary Committee at the end of the 111th Congress, and no further legislative action was taken on it.
- In a second attempt, the Startup Visa Act of 2011 was introduced in the Senate on 14 March 2011. However, it was again left to expire in the Judiciary Committee at the end of the 112th Congress and not enacted.
- The Startup Visa Act of 2013 was introduced in the Senate on 30 January 2013 and is currently awaiting Committee review. It has to undergo a review with the respective Judiciary committees and the Immigration subcommittees of the Senate and the House. According to Govtrack.us, "The majority of bills and resolutions never make it out of committee".

==== Obama administration ====
While the Startup Visa enjoys bi-partisan support and the White House have been repeatedly voicing support to principles relating to it, the Obama Administration have not been aggressively pushing the Startup Visa Act, even through the Startup America initiative, introduced in January 2011. During a conversation hosted by The Economist on 24 March 2011, Aneesh Chopra, the United States CTO, responded the following to Vivek Wadhwa's question about the Startup Visa: "The President has been emphatically clear, his support for high-skill immigration, but to do so as part of a broader, comprehensive immigration reform program".

This approach has drawn criticism from some supporters of the Startup Visa who see the White House as wanting to delay the bill for an undetermined length of time to include it in a Comprehensive Immigration Reform broadly covering legal and illegal immigration, viewed as politically "toxic" for the Startup Visa Act.

==== In the media ====
Some actual immigration mishaps that the Startup Visa hopes to address have been covered in the documentary film Starting-Up In America, released on 28 February 2011.

== Vetting entrepreneurs ==
Most entrepreneur visas available worldwide are temporary but will eventually lead to residency if the entrepreneur proves successful (except in Canada, which provides immediate permanent residency). Generally, these countries evaluate the entrepreneurial migrant application based on the economic interests of the individual's business idea and the project it represents for the country's economic growth. Entry requirements and the definition of success vary between countries, though it typically comes down to two key parameters: • What level must entrepreneurs and their businesses reach to qualify for entry and residency? • How quickly the above has to happen?

Most countries assess an entrepreneur's potential by considering the startup's capital (its amount and source) and the individual's profile (education or business background and/or business proposal). A graph summarising existing entrepreneur visa schemes worldwide can help read and compare the different schemes.

The criteria are often modulated and flexible, making it easier for specific individuals to qualify. For example, in New Zealand, the Entrepreneur Work Visa is a three-year work visa that works in two stages (a Startup stage and a Balance stage) to allow entrepreneurs to enable themselves throughout the time they qualify for the visa. There is also a waiver of the initial investment capital requirement for "businesses in science, ICT, or other high value export-oriented sector, which demonstrate a high level of innovation or credible short-term high growth prospects". In Canada, the initial investment required is of $118k if from VCs but only of $45k if from Angels and none if a business incubator program accepts in the entrepreneur. Some countries also offer simplified routes for recent graduates from that country - notably Germany and the UK.

In most countries, the eligibility to renew entrepreneur visas or to convert to permanent residency is assessed by the number of jobs created by the startup and either the additional investment raised or the revenue produced in a specific timeframe. In the UK, for example, entrepreneurs are expected to create two full-time jobs in three years to renew their visa, whereas in Singapore, to be granted a two-year visa extension, entrepreneurs must create two local jobs in their first year and four in the second. Typically, the tight deadlines for reaching these goals are justified by enabling the early identification of genuine businesses. However, they can have harmful consequences for startups by discouraging risk-taking and preventing entrepreneurs from making rational changes to their business plans that would compromise their visa statuses. It was precisely for this reason that modifications were made to Ireland's entrepreneur visa program. These changes removed the job creation requirement because, for some businesses, it can take longer to get off the ground than others.

== Alternatives ==
=== Blueseed ===
A company called Blueseed aims to create a startup community located on a vessel moored in international waters near the coast of Silicon Valley in the United States. The promoters believe that the location would enable non-U.S. startup entrepreneurs to work on their ventures without the need for a US work visa while living in proximity to Silicon Valley and using relatively more straightforward to obtain business and tourism visas. This workaround has been compared to the Startup Visa as it aims to accomplish similar goals. Craig Montuori, an evangelist for the Startup Visa, writes of Blueseed that "I can vouch for their passion on creating workarounds for jobs creating foreign entrepreneurs while waiting for Congress to create a Startup Visa as someone who has been advocating for Startup Visa for the past year."
