= Jean Marty =

French politician (1838–1916)

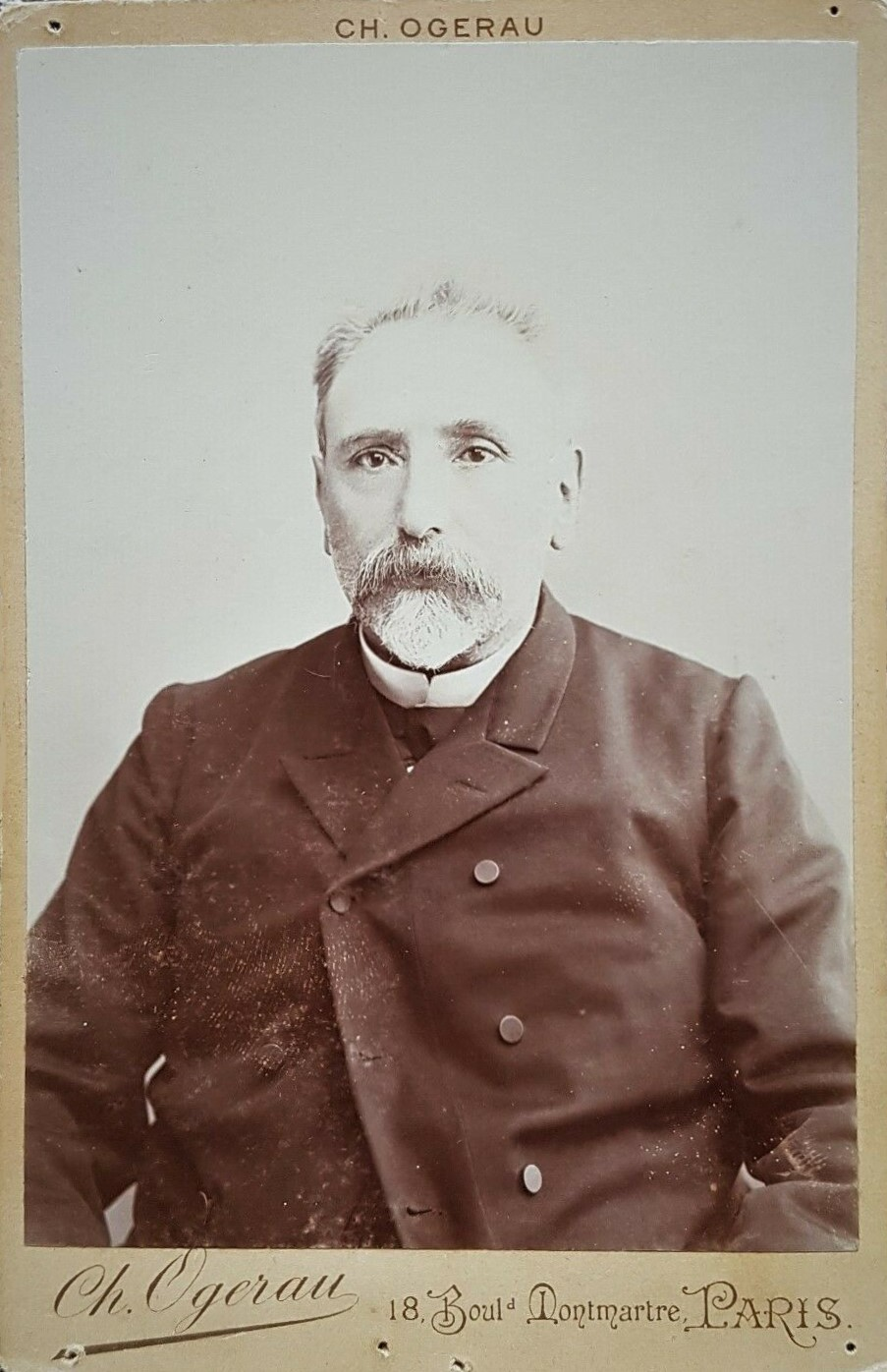

Jean Antoine Marty (French: [ʒɑ̃ ɑ̃twan maʁti]; 31 January 1838 – 5 November 1916) was a French lawyer and politician. He served as Minister of Commerce in Jean Casimir-Perier's government.
