= The Seasteading Institute =

Non-profit organization

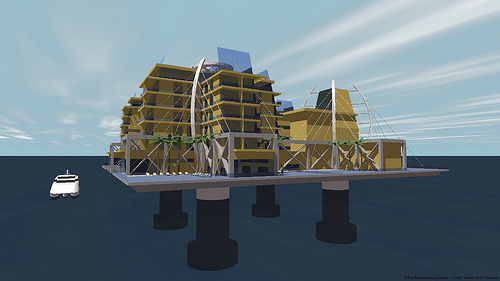
Rendering of the Seasteading Institute's "ClubStead"

The Seasteading Institute (TSI) is a 501(c)(3) non-profit organization formed to facilitate the establishment of autonomous, mobile communities on seaborne platforms operating in international waters (a proposed practice called seasteading). It was founded by Wayne Gramlich and Patri Friedman on April 15, 2008.

Friedman and Gramlich noted that according to the United Nations Convention on the Law of the Sea, a country's Exclusive Economic Zone extends 200 nautical miles (370 km) from shore. Beyond that boundary lie the high seas, which are not subject to the laws of any sovereign state other than the flag under which a ship sails. They proposed that a seastead could take advantage of the absence of laws and regulations outside the sovereignty of nations to experiment with new governance systems and allow the citizens of existing governments to exit more easily.

== History ==
The project picked up mainstream exposure after PayPal cofounder Peter Thiel donated $500,000 in initial seed capital (followed by subsequent contributions). He also spoke out on behalf of its viability in his essay "The Education of a Libertarian".

In 2008, Friedman and Gramlich said they hoped to float the first prototype seastead in the San Francisco Bay by 2010 followed by a seastead in 2014. TSI did not meet these targets.

In January 2009, the Seasteading Institute patented a design for a 200-person resort seastead, ClubStead, about a city block in size, produced by consultancy firm Marine Innovation & Technology. The ClubStead design marked the first major engineering analysis in the seasteading movement. In July 2009, Friedman launched Ephemerisle, intended to be a week-long event that modeled seasteading in the Pacific Ocean. Ephemerisle was held on a number of watercraft and makeshift floating platforms in the Sacramento-San Joaquin River Delta. Friedman abandoned the project the next year, but Ephemerisle continued as an annual event with a decentralized organizational structure.

In July 2012, the vessel Opus Casino was donated to the Seasteading Institute.

The Seasteading Institute held its first conference in Burlingame, California, October 10, 2008. Forty-five people from nine countries attended. The second Seasteading conference was significantly larger, and held in San Francisco, California, September 28–30, 2009. The third Seasteading conference took place May 31 – June 2, 2012.

== The Floating City Project ==
In the spring of 2013, TSI launched The Floating City Project. The project proposed to locate a floating city within the territorial waters of an existing nation, rather than the open ocean. TSI claimed that doing so would have several advantages by placing it within the international legal framework and making it easier to engineer and easier for people and equipment to reach. In October 2013, the Institute raised $27,082 from 291 funders in a crowdfunding campaign TSI used the funds to hire the Dutch marine engineering firm DeltaSync to write an engineering study for The Floating City Project.

In September 2016 the Seasteading Institute met with officials in French Polynesia to discuss building a prototype seastead in a sheltered lagoon. On January 13, 2017, French Polynesia Minister of Housing Jean-Christophe Bouissou signed a memorandum of understanding (MOU) with TSI to create the first semi-autonomous "seazone". TSI spun off a for-profit company called "Blue Frontiers", which will build and operate a prototype seastead in the zone. On March 3, 2018, French Polynesia's government said the agreement was "not a legal document" and had expired at the end of 2017. No action has been announced since. Blue Frontiers then began a search for a new host country for the project. In November 2018, it attempted to raise US$3 million for the project using cryptocurrency, but failed.

== See also ==
- Seasteading
