= Seasteading =

Concept of creating permanent dwellings at sea

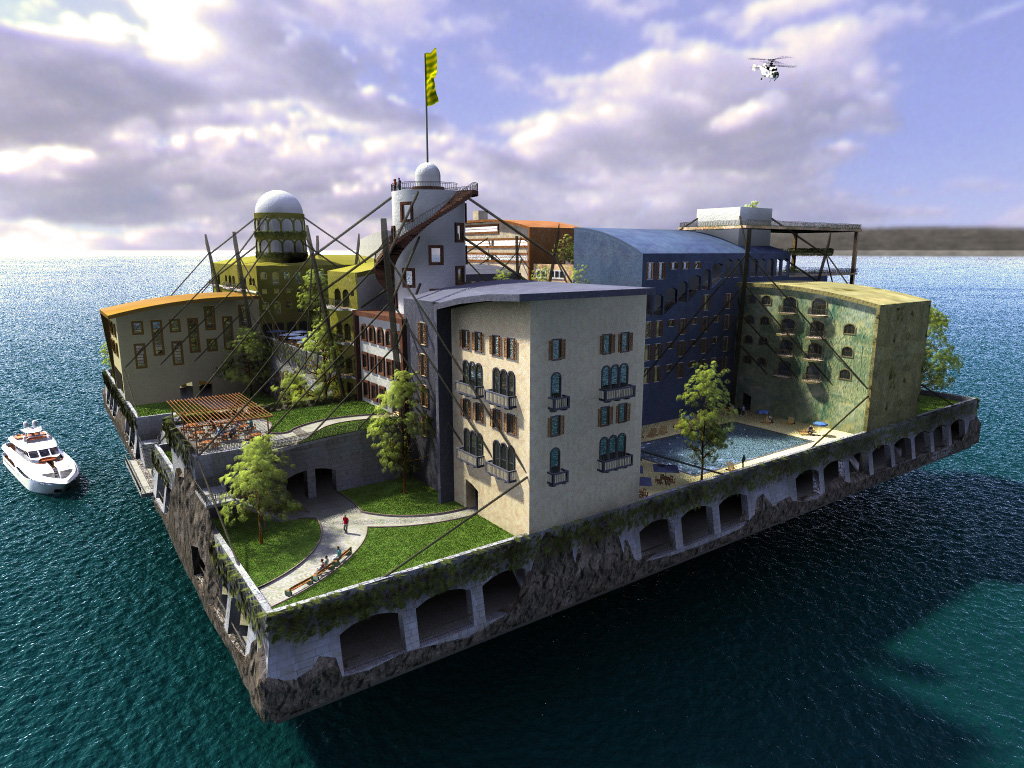
Rendering of András Győrfi's "The Swimming City", a modular island

Seasteading is the creation of permanent dwellings in international waters, so-called seasteads, that are independent of established governments. No structure on the high seas has yet been created and recognized as a sovereign state. Proposed structures have included modified cruise ships, refitted oil platforms, and custom-built floating islands.

The Seasteading Institute says seasteads can "provide the means for rapid innovation in voluntary governance and reverse environmental damage to our oceans ... and foster entrepreneurship." Some critics fear seasteads may function primarily as a refuge for the wealthy to evade taxes or other national legislation.

While seasteading may guarantee some freedom from unwanted rules, the high seas are regulated internationally through bodies of admiralty law and law of the sea, and nationally through flagging registration.

The term seasteading is a blend of sea and homesteading, and dates back to the 1960s.

== History ==
=== Background ===
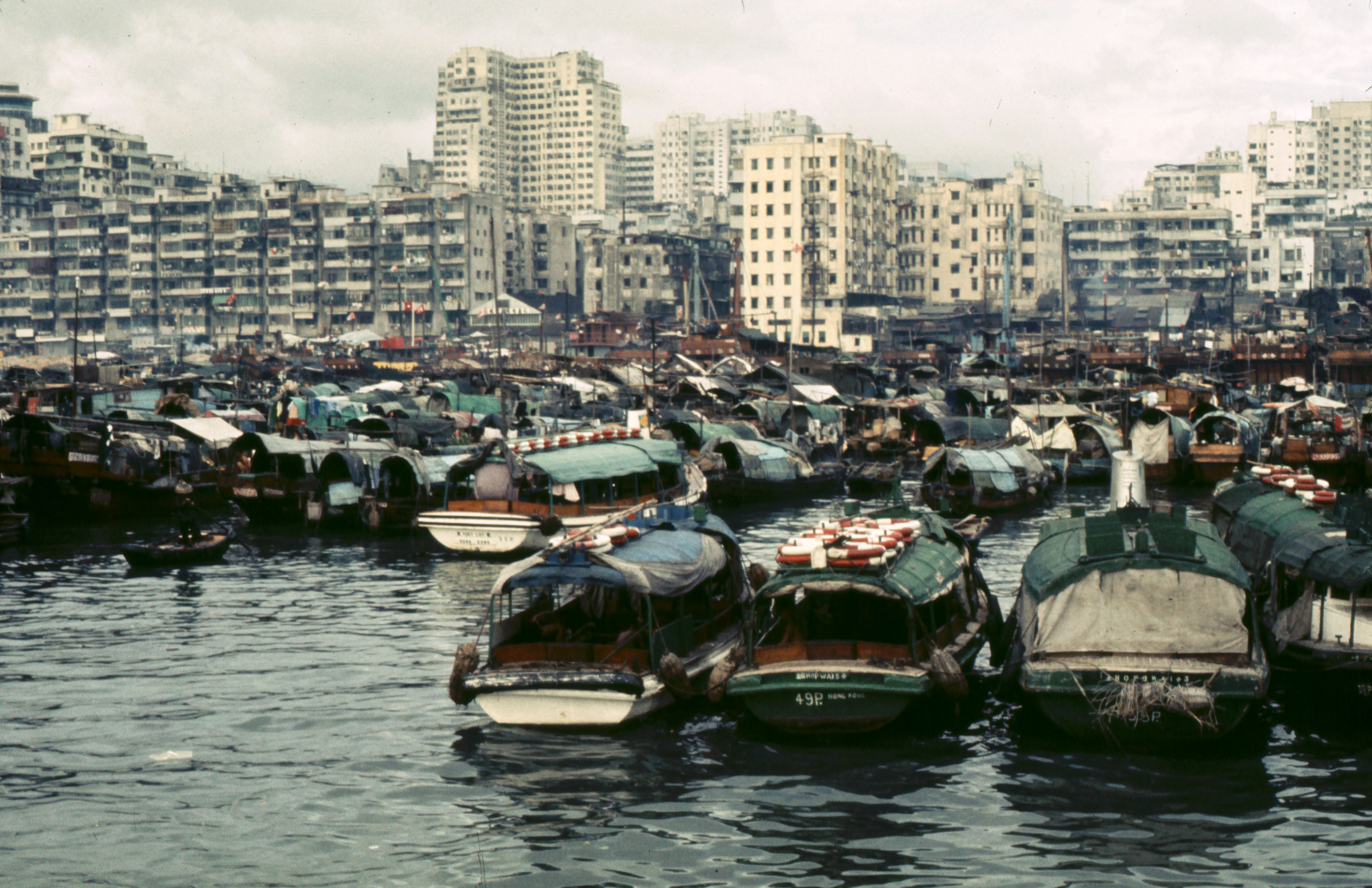
Past Hong Kong Yau Ma Tei shelter of house boats for Tanka people typhoon refugees

Nomadic ocean life has been practiced for millennia by so-called sea nomad peoples, particularly around Southeast Asia.

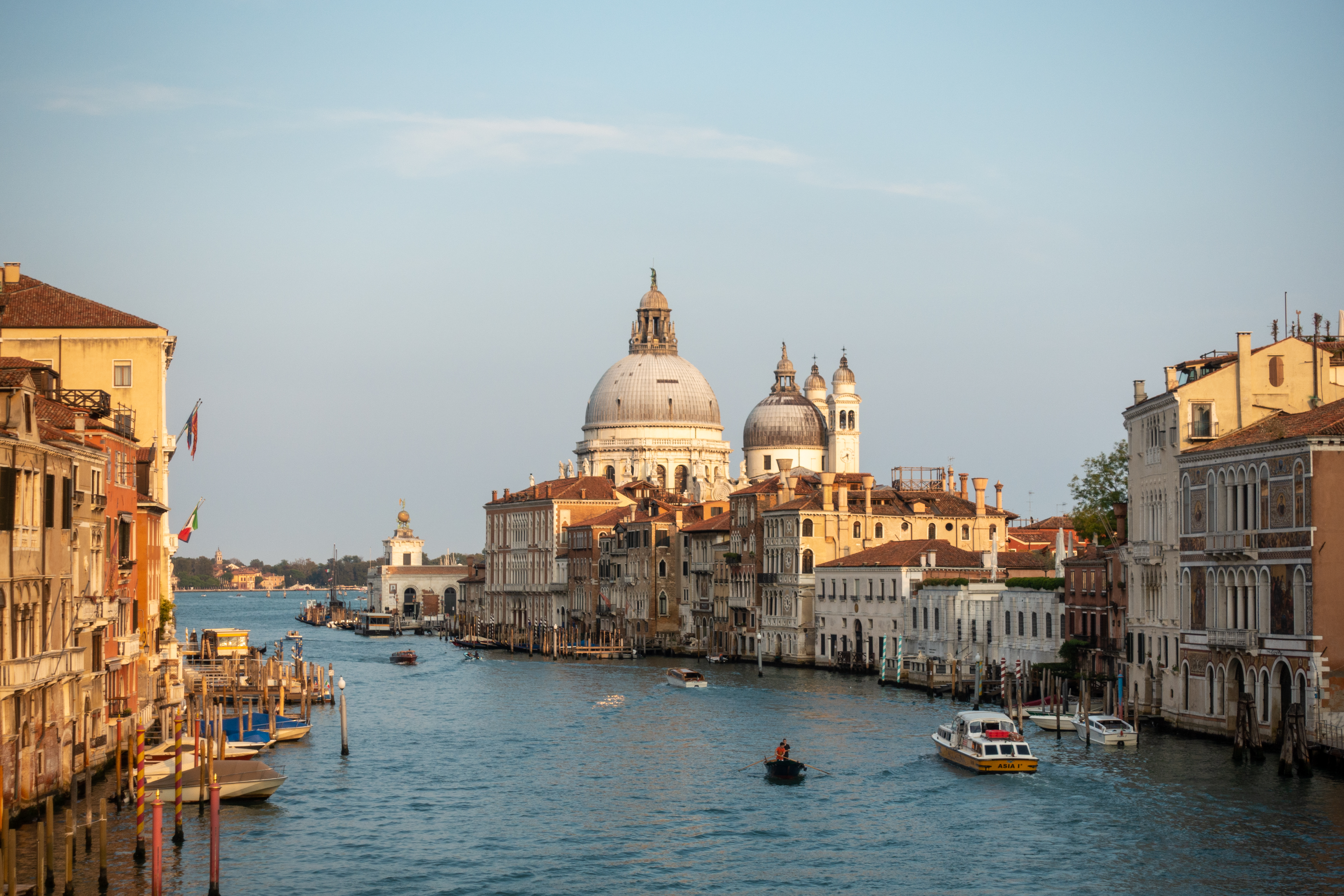
Venice, while built on stilts, has been identified as an early example of seasteading, not only as a longstanding maritime settlement, but also as the center of the historic independent state of the Republic of Venice.

Historic inspiration for seasteading includes Venice, which, while built on stilts like similar settlements to its North, East or South, is not only a longstanding maritime settlement, but also center of the historic independent state of the Republic of Venice.

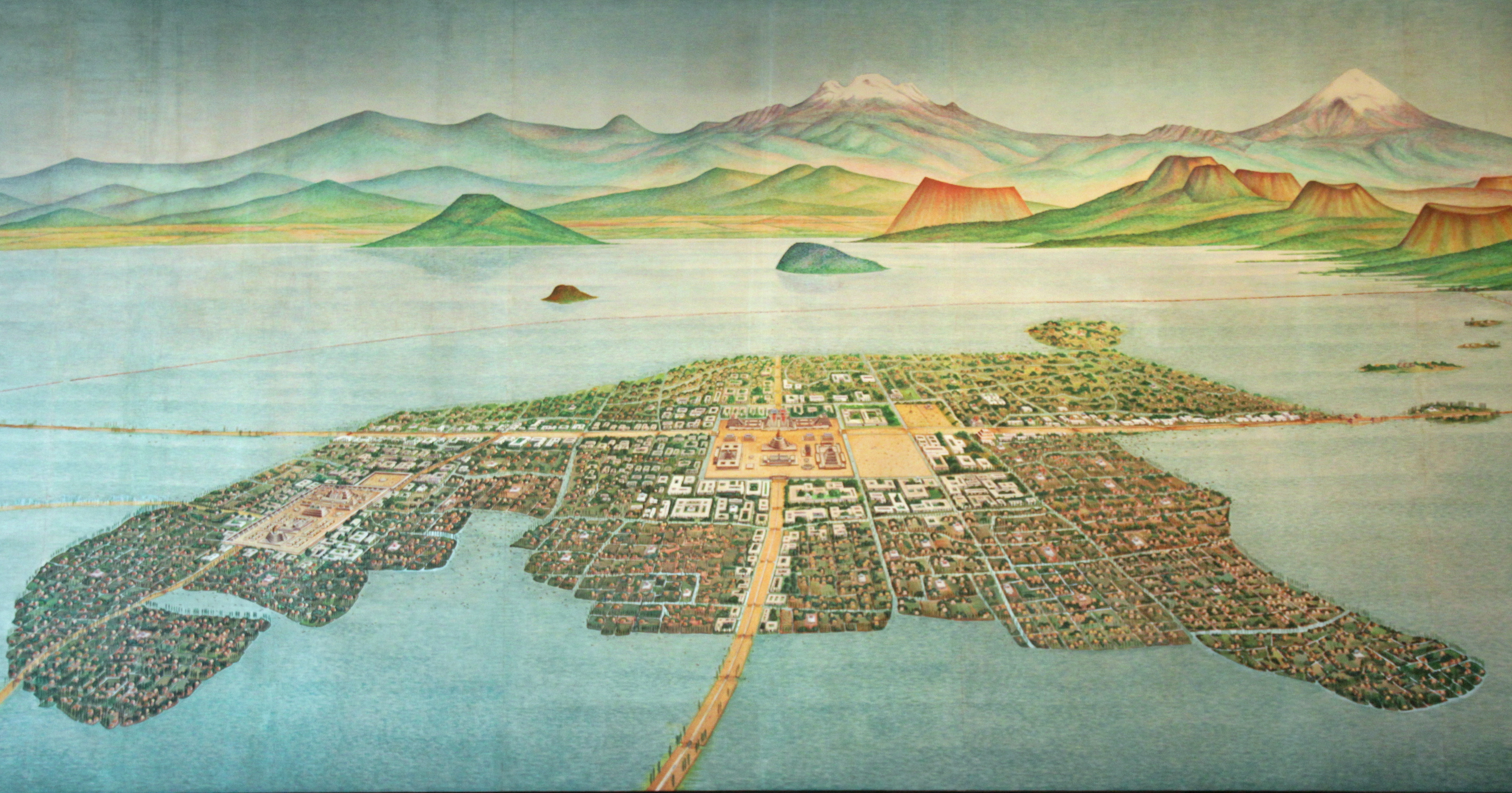
Modern drawing of Tenochtitlan, the capital city of the Aztec Empire

Other inspirations include Tenochtitlan, the capital city of the Aztec Empire, founded on an island in Lake Texcoco with connected artificial islands built around it – Mexico City now entirely covers the lake's basin – and floating communities such as the Uru people on Lake Titicaca, the Tanka people in Aberdeen, Hong Kong, and the Makoko in Lagos, Nigeria.

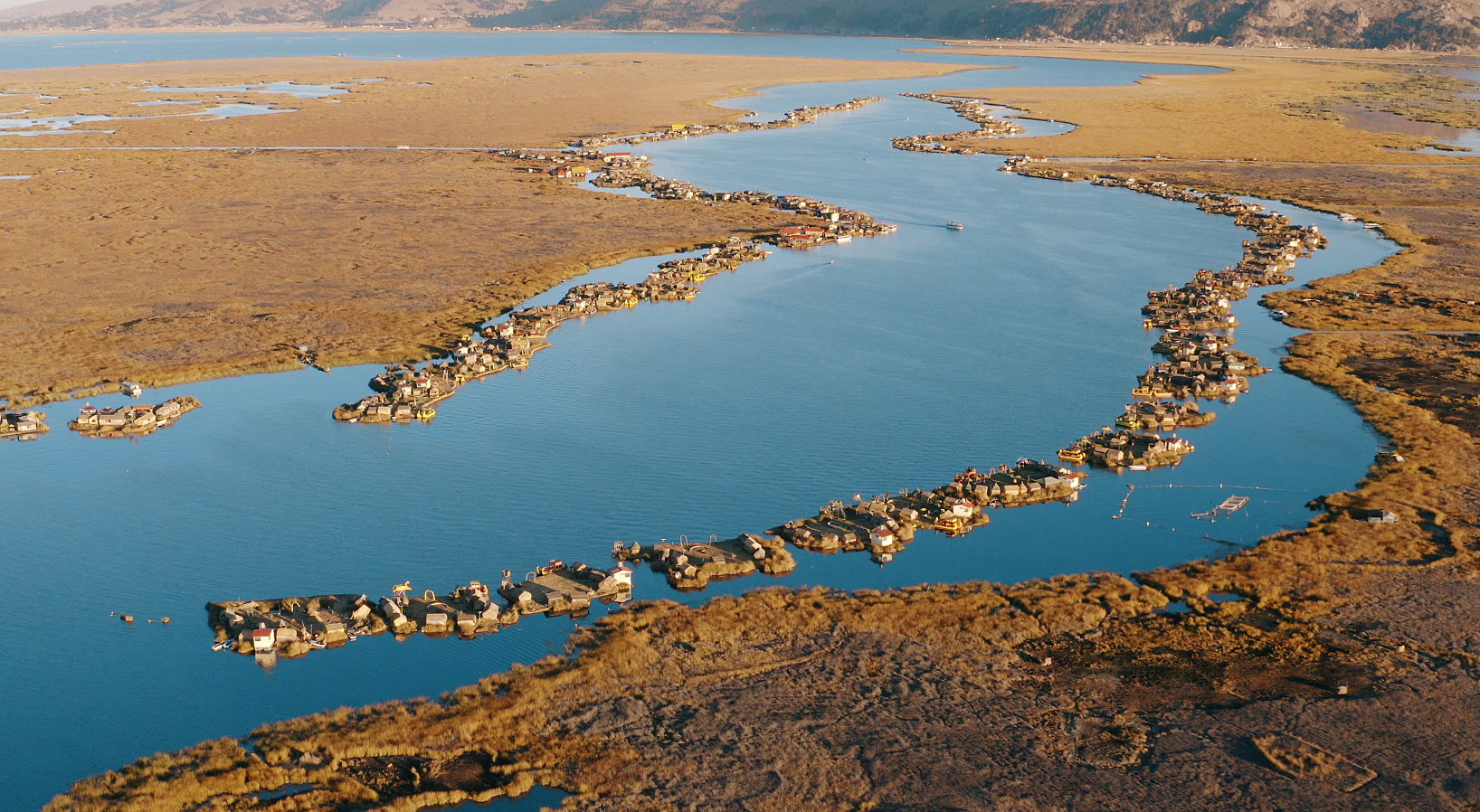
While not at sea the South American Uru peoples build settlements on floating islands on Lake Titicaca.

More recent inspirations include:

- The Republic of Rose Island, a short-lived micronation on a man-made platform in the Adriatic Sea, 11 kilometres (6.8 mi) off the coast of the province of Rimini, Italy
- Pirate radio stations anchored in international waters, broadcasting to listeners on shore
- The Principality of Sealand, a micronation formed on a decommissioned sea fort near Suffolk, England

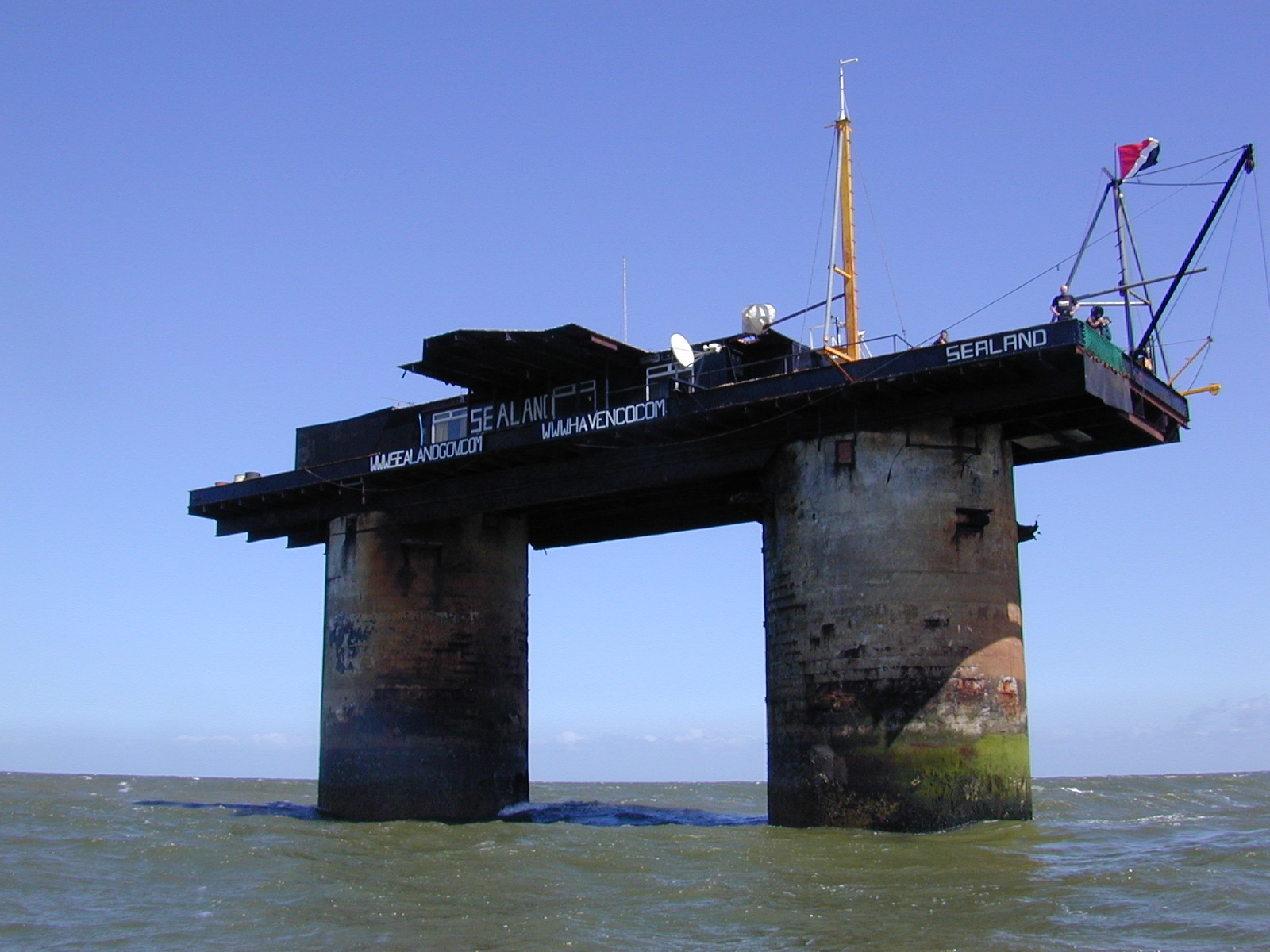
The unrecognised, self-declared micronation of Sealand, at the bay of the Thames Estuary, based on an abandoned United Kingdom military sea fort

- Smaller floating islands in protected waters, such as Richart Sowa's Spiral Island
- The non-profit Women on Waves, which operates hospital ships that allow access to abortions for women in countries where abortions are subject to strict laws.

=== Contemporary advocacy ===
Many architects and firms have created designs for floating cities, including Vincent Callebaut, Paolo Soleri and companies such as Shimizu, Ocean Builders and E. Kevin Schopfer.

Marshall Savage discussed building tethered artificial islands in his 1992 book The Millennial Project: Colonizing the Galaxy in Eight Easy Steps, with several color plates illustrating his ideas.

A 1998 essay by Wayne Gramlich attracted the attention of Patri Friedman. The two began working together and posted their first collaborative book online in 2001. Their book explored many aspects of seasteading from waste disposal to flags of convenience. This collaboration led to the creation of the non-profit Seasteading Institute (TSI) in 2008. As an intermediate step, the Seasteading Institute has promoted cooperation with an existing nation on prototype floating islands with legal semi-autonomy within the nation's protected territorial waters. On 13 January 2017, the Seasteading Institute signed a memorandum of understanding (MOU) with French Polynesia to create the first semi-autonomous "seazone" for a prototype but political changes driven by the French Polynesia presidential election led the country to back out of the project and permanently cut ties with Seasteading on 14 March 2018.

The first single-family seastead was launched near Phuket, Thailand by Ocean Builders in March 2019. Two months later, the Thai Navy claimed the seastead was a threat to Thai sovereignty.

In April 2019, the concept of floating cities as a way to cope with rising oceans was included in a presentation by the United Nations program UN-Habitat. As presented, they would be limited to sheltered waters.

=== Contemporary concerns ===
Critics of seasteading argue that some projects resemble "techno-colonialism" or risk displacing coastal communities, and advocates of seasteading understate the political and economic difficulty of establishing autonomous governance at sea. Other critics have also noted the difficulties of remoteness and cost of offshore living, potential environmental impacts, and the likelihood of interference by nearby states, such as what happened in Thailand in 2019.

== Specific proposals ==
=== The Seasteading Institute ===
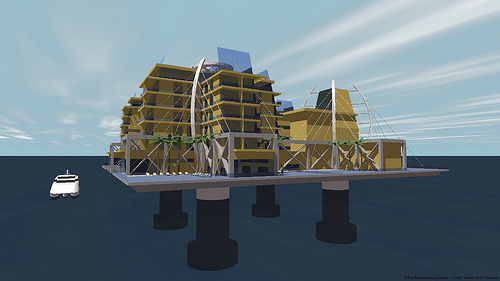
Rendering of the Seasteading Institute's "ClubStead"

The Seasteading Institute is a nonprofit organization with seed capital by tech billionaire Peter Thiel which has held several seasteading conferences and started The Floating City Project, which is proposed to locate a floating city within the territorial waters of an existing nation. The Seasteading Institute also seeks to develop formal classifications for a variety of seasteads located in international waters to make them compatible with flagging registries, marine insurance needs and UNCLOS.

=== Jounieh Floating Island project (JFIP) ===
A proposal to build a floating island with a luxury hotel in Jounieh north of the Lebanese capital Beirut, was stalled as of 2015 because of concerns from local officials about environmental and regulatory matters.

=== Blueseed ===
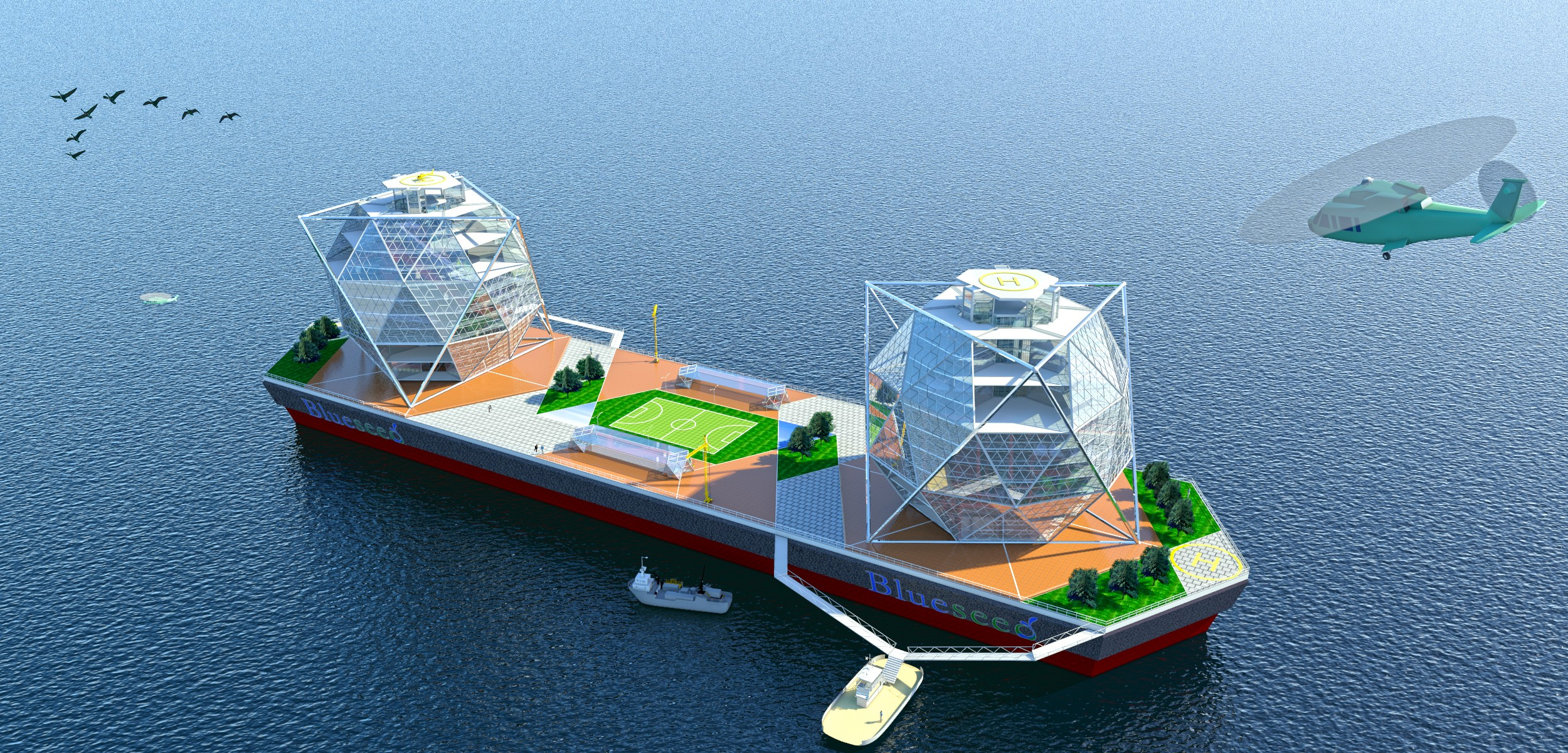
Architectural drawing of Blueseed "habitat units"

Blueseed was a company aiming to float a ship near Silicon Valley to serve as a visa-free startup community and entrepreneurial incubator. Blueseed founders Max Marty and Dario Mutabdzija met when both were employees of The Seasteading Institute. The project planned to offer living and office space, high-speed Internet connectivity, and regular ferry service to the mainland but as of 2014 the project was "on hold", and was later described as "failed" due to lack of investors and possible trouble with the Startup Visa Bill before the US Congress, which would make the concept obsolete.

=== MS Satoshi ===
The cruise ship MS Satoshi was purchased (as Pacific Dawn) in 2020 by Ocean Builders Central to become a floating residence in the Gulf of Panama. However, after failing to obtain insurance for the proposed operation, the ship was resold in 2021 for cruise operations.

=== Dogen City ===
A Japanese consortium called N-Ark has a proposal to build a floating "healthcare city" to fit 10,000 people, with hopes to start construction by 2030.

=== The Rationalist Fleet ===
Motivated by the high cost of housing, Ziz LaSota expressed a desire to create a "rationalist fleet" of like-minded people who would live in boats off the coast of the San Francisco Bay Area. She recruited several people, mostly transgender or nonbinary, who would later go on to be referred to as Zizians. For a few years, they lived in several boats, including a rusty tugboat they piloted from Alaska in 2017, but eventually abandoned the idea and rented space on land instead.

== Types ==
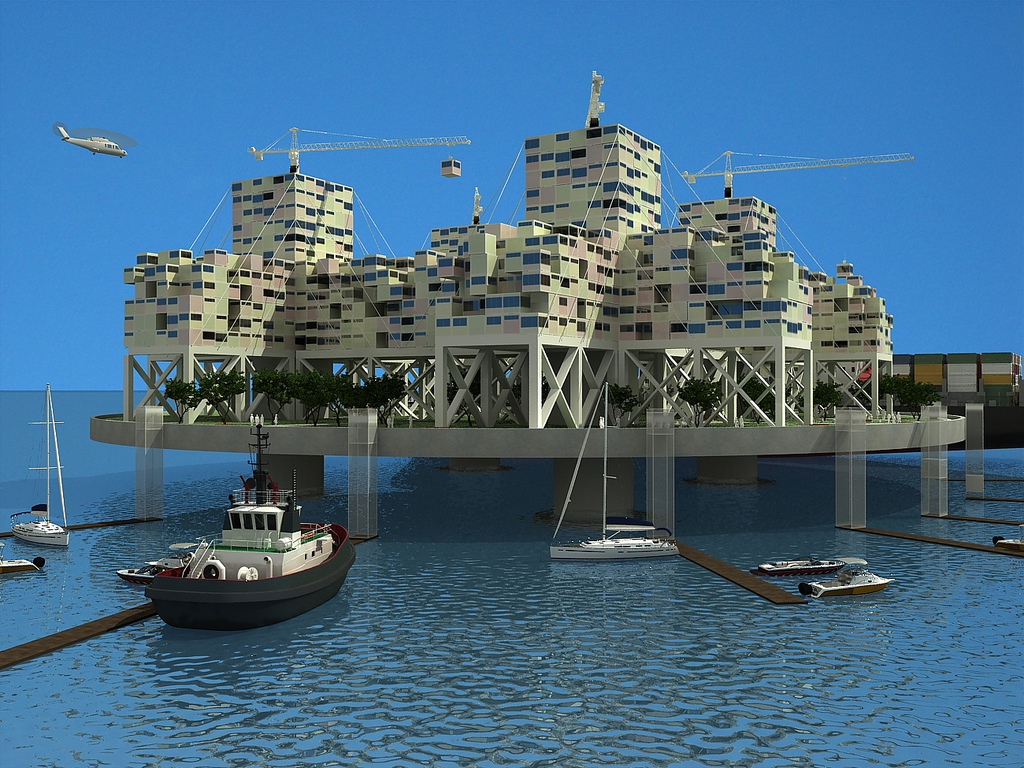
A design by Anthony Ling

=== Cruise ships ===
Cruise ships are a proven technology, and address most of the challenges of living at sea for extended periods of time. However, they are typically optimized for travel and short-term stay, not for permanent residence in a single location.

Many proposals have been made for seasteading retrofits of cruise ships, although none have succeeded. Examples include:

- MS Satoshi
- Blue Seed retro-fitted cruise ship
- Freedom Ship

=== Spar platform ===
Platform designs based on spar buoys, similar to oil platforms. In this design, the platforms rest on spars in the shape of floating dumbbells, with the living area high above sea level. Building on spars in this fashion reduces the influence of wave action on the structure.

Proposals include:

- TSI Clubstead
- Evolo retrofitted oil platform
- SeaPod

=== Modular island ===
There are numerous seastead designs based around interlocking modules made of reinforced concrete. Reinforced concrete is used for floating docks, oil platforms, dams, and other marine structures.

Proposals include:

- The Floating City Project / Blue Frontiers.
- Evolo Oceanscraper.
- AT Design Office floating city concept.
- Freedom Haven

=== Monolithic island ===
A single, monolithic structure that is not intended to be expanded or connected to other modules.

Proposals include:

- Evolo Seascraper
- SeaOrbiter proposed oceangoing research vessel.

== In popular culture ==
Seasteading has been imagined many times in novels, including: Jules Verne's 1895 science-fiction book Propeller Island (L'Île à hélice) about an artificial island designed to travel the waters of the Pacific Ocean; Freezone, a seventeen square mile platform similar to Las Vegas positioned 100 miles north of Morocco in the Eclipse Trilogy of the 1980s, and the 2003 novel The Scar, which featured a floating city named Armada.

It has been a central concept in some movies, notably Waterworld (1995), and in TV series such as Stargate Atlantis, which had a complete floating city. A two-episode sequence of the show Silicon Valley featured a seastead positioned at the International Date Line.

It is a common setting in video games, forming the premise of the Bioshock series, Metal Gear Solid: Peace Walker, Metal Gear Solid V: The Phantom Pain, Brink, and Call of Duty: Black Ops II; and in anime, such as Gargantia on the Verdurous Planet which takes place mainly on a traveling city made of an interconnected fleet of ocean ships.

A satirical take on seasteading in the context of human extinction is depicted in the Love, Death & Robots episode "Three Robots: Exit Strategies". In the Archer episode "Cold Fusion", a villain attempts to melt the polar ice caps to promote his floating city development company.

== See also ==
- Floating airport
- Intentional community
- HavenCo
- Houseboat
- Mobile offshore base
- Ocean colonization
- Operation Atlantis
- Pneumatic stabilized platform
- Russian floating nuclear power station
- Underwater habitat
- Very large floating structure
- Wolf Hilbertz
