= Stoessel =

Stoessel, Stössel, or Stossel may refer to:

- Albert Stoessel (1894–1943), American composer, violinist and conductor
- Anatoly Stessel (1848–1915), Russian baron, military leader, and general
- Johann Stössel (1524–1576), Lutheran reformer and theologian
- Johannes Stössel (1837–1919), Swiss politician
- John Stossel (born 1947), American journalist and TV presenter with Fox
- Ludwig Stössel (1883–1973), Jewish actor forced to flee Europe in 1933
- Martina Stoessel (born 1997), Argentine singer and actress
- Scott Stossel (born 1969), American journalist and editor
- Thomas P. Stossel, (1941–2019), M.D. and author at Harvard Medical School
- Walter John Stoessel, Jr. (1920–1986), U.S. diplomat
- Stoessel lute, musical instrument
- Stossel (TV series), political talk show on Fox Business Network
