= Yelm Ditch =

Irrigation canal in Washington state

- Location within Washington (state)
- Location: Near Yelm, Washington
- Country: United States
- Coordinates: 46°50′35.37″N 122°25′35.42″W

Specifications
- Maximum height AMSL: 123 metres (404 ft)

History
- Date completed: June 19, 1916

Geography
- Start point: Nisqually River near 46°54′25.36″N 122°30′36.43″W (From USGS)
- End point: 46°53′23.36″N 122°29′38.43″W (From USGS)

Yelm Ditch is an abandoned irrigation canal near Yelm in Thurston County, Washington. It was completed by the Yelm Irrigation Company at a cost of $100,000 on June 29, 1916. At the time, Yelm had a population of a few hundred, and the Yelm Irrigation Project was "one of Western Washington's first irrigation districts", bringing water from the Nisqually River to irrigate farms on the Yelm Prairie. The crops irrigated by the canal included red and black raspberries and Bluelake beans.

== See also ==
- Centralia Canal
- Elbow Lake (Thurston County, Washington)
- List of canals in the United States
