= J. Z. Knight =

American spiritual teacher and author (born 1946)

JZ Knight
- Born: Judith Darlene Hampton; March 16, 1946 (age 80); Roswell, New Mexico, U.S.
- Citizenship: United States
- Occupations: New Age channeler, author, speaker
- Years active: 1977–present
- Known for: Ramtha's School of Enlightenment
- Children: 2
- Website: www.jzknight.com

Judy "Zebra" (aka JZ) Knight (born Judith Darlene Hampton; March 16, 1946) is an American spiritual teacher and author known for her purported channelling of a spiritual entity named Ramtha. Critics consider her to be a cult leader.

Knight has appeared on a variety of American television shows, including Larry King, MSNBC and The Merv Griffin Show, as well as in other media forms, such as Psychology Today. Her teachings have attracted figures from the entertainment and political worlds, such as Linda Evans, Shirley MacLaine, and Salma Hayek. Knight claims to bridge ancient wisdom and the "power of consciousness" with modern science. Some of the ideas are similar to those of MacLaine, which were criticized for being "kindergarten metaphysics" by mathematician and skeptic Martin Gardner. In her book Dancing in the Light, MacLaine claimed that she was the brother of Ramtha in their Atlantean past lives. Ramtha's teachings have been criticized by scientists and skeptics. The Southern Poverty Law Center has criticized Knight for "homophobic, anti-Catholic, anti-Semitic racist rants".

Knight lives in a 12,800-square-foot (1,190 m^{2}) French chateau-style home in Yelm, Washington, teaches courses, and runs Ramtha's School of Enlightenment.

Knight has been married three times and is the mother of two children, both from her first marriage.

== Career ==
Knight grew up in poverty. After graduating from high school, she dropped out of business school. She later worked in the cable television industry, and due to her work moved to Tacoma, Washington, where, according to her autobiography, a psychic told her the "Enlightened One" would appear to her in the future. She says that Ramtha first appeared to her in her kitchen in 1977.

Knight appeared on The Merv Griffin Show in 1985 and wrote the autobiographical A State of Mind in 1987. Time called her "probably the most celebrated of all current channelers". She is currently the president of JZK, Inc. and Ramtha's School of Enlightenment, located near Yelm, Washington. Knight owns several US trademark registrations featuring the "Ramtha" name. She appeared in the 2004 film What the Bleep Do We Know!?, produced by members of the Ramtha School.

== Ramtha ==
"Ramtha"—the name is claimed to be derived from Ram and to mean "the God" in Ramtha's language—is a reputed entity whom Knight says she channels. According to Knight, Ramtha was a Lemurian warrior who fought the Atlanteans over 35,000 years ago. Knight claims Ramtha speaks of leading an army over 2.5 million strong (more than twice the estimated world population at about 30,000 BC) for 63 years, and conquering three-fourths of the known world (which was allegedly going through cataclysmic geological changes). According to Knight, Ramtha led the army for 10 years until he was betrayed and almost killed.

Knight maintains Ramtha spent the next seven years in isolation recovering and observing nature, the seasons, his army making homes and families, and many other things. She says he later mastered many skills, including foresight and out-of-body experiences, until he led his army to the Indus River while in his late fifties (after having led his army for 63 years). According to Knight, Ramtha taught his soldiers everything he knew for 120 days, then he bade them farewell, rose into the air, and in a bright flash of light ascended before them. Knight promised his army he would return to teach them everything he learned. In 1977, Ramtha appeared before JZ Knight, telling her he came to help her. She claims to be his first student in the great work.

=== Teachings ===
Ramtha is the central figure (the "master teacher") of Ramtha's School of Enlightenment, started by Knight in 1987 near the town of Yelm, Washington. Classes (or "dialogues") had been held worldwide for the previous 10 years. There are currently over 6,000 students of Knight's teachings.

The four cornerstones of Knight's philosophy are:

- The statement 'You are god'
- The directive to make known the unknown
- The concept that consciousness and energy create the nature of reality
- The challenge to conquer yourself

Knight's teachings appear to be a mixture of Jungian philosophy, Western occult traditions, and contemporary positive-thinking attitudes (such as New Age beliefs), and have yet to stand against elementary skepticism or scrutiny. Predictions made by Knight in the name of the disembodied entity have either failed to come true (e.g., that a holocaust would take place in 1985 or the US would be involved in a major war in 1985) or the predicted scenarios are too wide to evaluate and/or have too large an error margin to be considered, which is usually the case with channelers.

When Knight says she is channeling Ramtha, she speaks mostly in English in what sounds like an accent from the British Raj.

In her teachings, "Ramtha" has made several controversial statements, including that Christianity is a "backward" religion; that the parables of Jesus can be explained by means of photon waves and probability; that "murder isn't really wrong or evil" (if one believes in reincarnation); and, during the court case JZ Knight v Jeff Knight, the latter Knight stated Ramtha had declared HIV/AIDS to be Nature's way of "getting rid of" homosexuality. The Southern Poverty Law Center observed "Ramtha" has made antisemitic comments, such as "Fuck God's chosen people! I think they have earned enough cash to have paid their way out of the goddamned gas chambers by now".

== Controversy and criticism ==
Skeptics point to Ramtha's story as proof that he does not exist. Ramtha claims to come from the continent of Lemuria and to have conquered Atlantis. The existence of the two locations is considered legendary, and neither has been found. Furthermore, the claim that Ramtha led an army of 2.5 million contradicts estimates of the world population in 33,000 BC, and her claims of clairvoyant, telepathic, telekinetic, and other extrasensory perception abilities, for which there is no scientific support, have been heavily criticized by skeptics and scientific communities.

Magician and skeptic James Randi said that Ramtha's believers have "no way of evaluating [her teachings]", while Carl Sagan, in his book The Demon-Haunted World, says that "the simplest hypothesis is that Ms. Knight makes 'Ramtha' speak all by herself, and that she has no contact with disembodied entities from the Pleistocene Ice Age." He goes on to write a list of questions that Ramtha's answers to would help us determine whether he is actually a disembodied entity from the Paleolithic times (such as "What were the indigenous languages, and social structure?", "What was their writing like?" or "How do we know that he lived 35,000 years ago?"), and ends by saying that "[i]nstead, all we are offered are banal homilies."

Knight's former husband, Jeff Knight, in a 1992 interview with Joe Szimhart, said that Ramtha's teachings are a "farce" and that they are "just a money making [sic] business for [JZ Knight]". He also said that students of Ramtha's School of Enlightenment are "involved in a very dangerous, very evil corrupt thing".

Attacks and criticism against Ramtha's teachings and Ramtha's School of Enlightenment have also been made by former students of the school. David McCarthy, a Yelm resident and student of the school between 1989 and 1996, has accused the school of being a cult. He further claims that he was intimidated during his studies there and felt like Knight and the school were exerting mind control. He said, "At one point, I was running around scared I was going to get eaten by the lizard people." McCarthy became disappointed, not only with his own experience of Ramtha's teachings but also as he had cut ties from his family to become a student as they lived in a different country. This prompted McCarthy to create a group called "Life After Ramtha's School of Enlightenment," which questions the authenticity of Ramtha and encourages individuals to share their experiences after realizing that Ramtha's School of Enlightenment is a cult. The school has also been characterized as a cult by skeptic Michael Shermer in his book Why People Believe Weird Things.

During an interview with David McCarthy, Glenn Cunningham, a former bodyguard of JZ Knight, shared insights into the workings of Ramtha's School of Enlightenment. He criticized several activities, such as trademarking ideas and phrases that originated from other authors long before. For instance, the concept of the "Blue Body" and the blending of quantum physics with New Age ideas can be traced back to Vera Stanley Alder's From the Mundane to the Magnificent published in 1979. Cunningham pointed out that he observed similarities between Knight and Ramtha, including the mispronunciation of words and the quoting of the same books Knight had read.

Furthermore, Ramtha's teachings as they are portrayed in the movie What the Bleep Do We Know!?, not only in the general gist of the film (which was directed and funded by students of Ramtha's School of Enlightenment) but also in instances where Ramtha is interviewed on screen, have been heavily criticized by the scientific community, and skeptics, such as James Randi.

=== Court cases ===
Knight has been involved in several personal and business-related court disputes. She brought a suit against a woman from Berlin named Julie Ravell for disturbing Knight's psychic state and leaving her "hanging in spiritual limbo" during the five years Ravell claimed she was also channeling Ramtha. The case was brought to the supreme court in Vienna and lasted over five years, at the end of which Austria's supreme court awarded copyright to Knight as the sole channeler of Ramtha, and Ravell was made to pay $800 in psychic damages to Knight. Another case involving copyright and trademark ownership was JZK, Inc v Glandon, in which Joseph Glandon was accused of distributing copyrighted teachings of Ramtha.

In Knight v Knight (1992–1995), Jeff Knight claimed he lost years of life by delaying HIV treatment based on his wife's advice that Ramtha could heal him. The court ruled against him, and he died before appealing.

Through JZK Inc., Knight accused WhiteWind Weaver, a Thurston County, Washington, citizen, of stealing her ideas and using her and Ramtha's teachings in her workshops. A trial began on March 10, 2008, in Thurston County Superior Court; at the end of it Knight, was awarded about $10,000 after the court decided against WhiteWind Weaver.

Knight also refused to attend court as a witness in a case involving a 15-year-old who claimed rape against two students of Ramtha's School of Enlightenment. The 15-year-old girl had written a letter to Knight, which mentioned that Wayne Allen Geis, her dancing and acting teacher, had engaged in sexual intercourse with her from 1995 to 1997. The illicit activities had also involved Ruth Beverly Martin. They had apparently told the girl that sexual intercourse would help her relax and improve her acting ability. Knight invited the girl to a retreat at the school in November 1999. In the retreat, Ramtha questioned the girl, her father, Geis, and Martin. This inquiry took place on stage in front of an audience of over 800 people for about an hour. Geis and Martin confessed to having molested the girl, and the school contacted authorities. Charged with 10 counts of first-degree sexual misconduct with a minor, Geis and Martin pleaded not guilty, and the case went to trial. Prosecutors were reluctant to have Knight appear in court due to the "circus atmosphere" that would have been created. Knight herself claimed that she had been in a trance and did not remember anything of what was said in the retreat inquiry.

== See also ==
- Channeling
- Extrasensory perception
- New Age Spirituality
- Pseudoscience
- Skepticism
- The Power of Belief
- What The Bleep Do We Know
