= Familial Amyloidosis, Finnish Type =

- Other names: Gelsolin amyloidosis
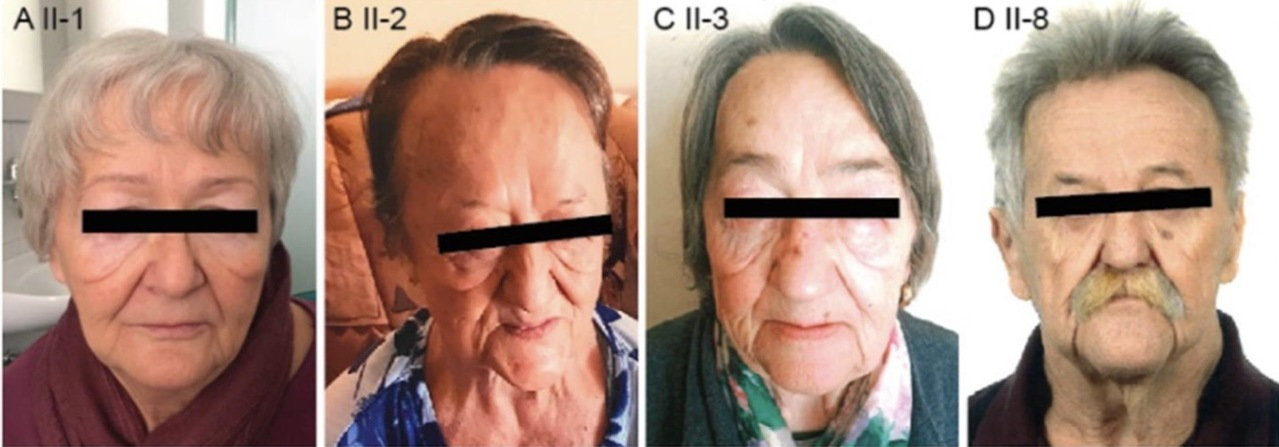
- This illustration shows patients with hereditary Gelsolin amyloidosis. Cutis laxa is one of the features of this disorder, which can be seen in this illustration.

Familial Amyloidosis, Finnish Type (FAF), also called hereditary gelsolin amyloidosis and AGel amyloidosis (AGel), is an amyloid condition with a number of associated cutaneous and neurological presentations deriving from the aberrant proteolysis of a mutated form of plasma gelsolin. First described in 1969 by the Finnish ophthalmologist Jouko Meretoja, FAF is uncommon with 400–600 cases described in Finland and 15 elsewhere. Mutations are inherited in an autosomal dominant fashion.

== Presentation ==
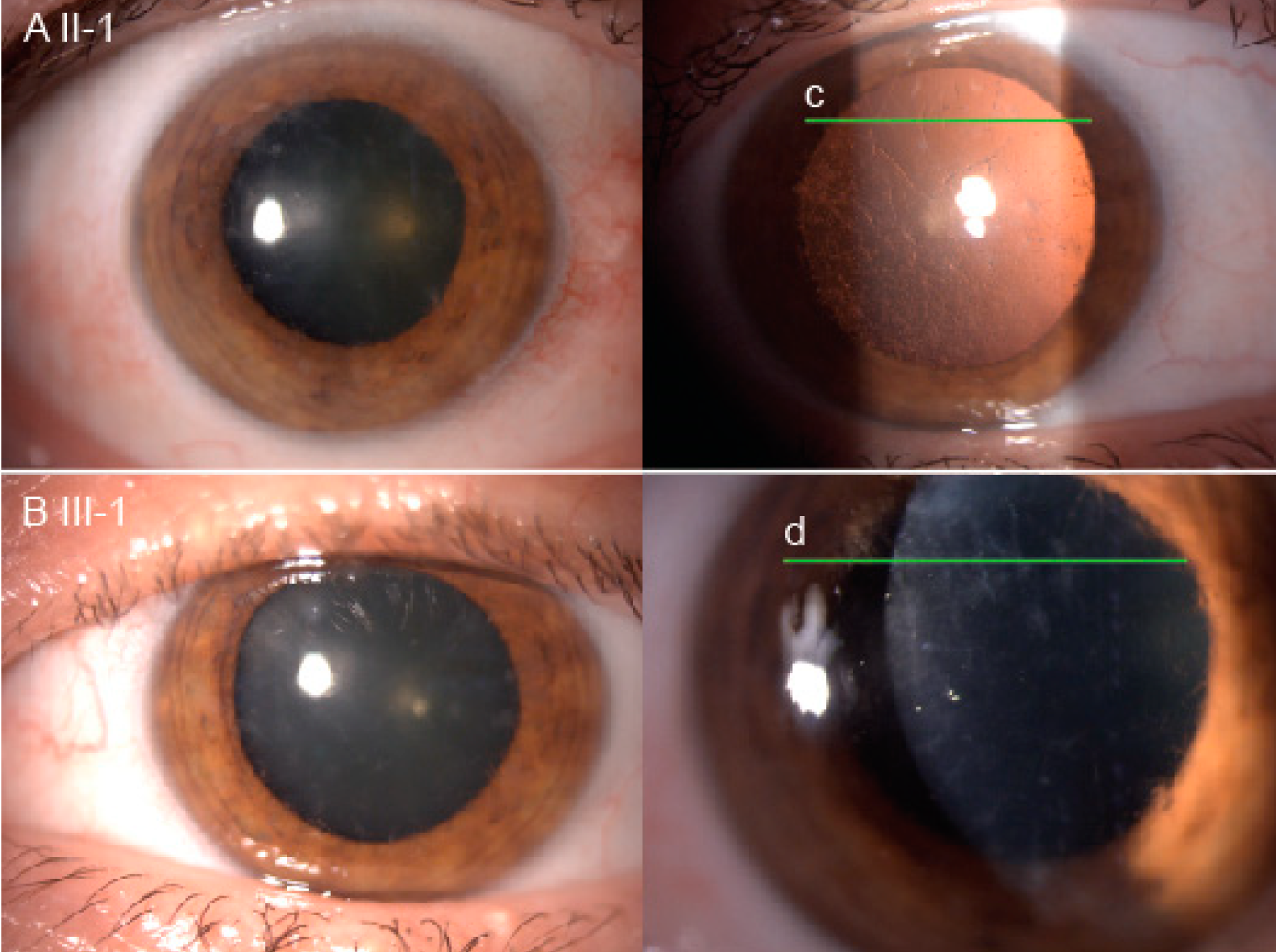
This illustration shows slit-lamp examination of the patient with hereditary gelsolin amyloidosis. Corneal lattice dystrophy can be seen.

The disorder is primarily associated with eye, skin, and cranial nerve symptoms with the onset of symptoms appearing between the thirties and fifties. The most common characteristic is type II lattice corneal dystrophy with other signs such as polyneuropathy, dermatochalasis, open-angle glaucoma, bilateral progressive facial paralysis, cutis laxa, skin fragility with ecchymosis, facial mask, diffuse hair loss, dry skin, carpal tunnel syndrome, nephrotic syndrome, cardiomyopathy with conduction alterations, and early aging associated with the condition. There are no specific treatments available.

== Plasma gelsolin amyloid ==
Plasma gelsolin is a 755 amino acid, 83 kDa plasma protein involved in the regulation and resolution of inflammation. It is made up of six "gelsolin domains," each consisting of a 5–6 strand β-sheet between one long and one short α-helix. Several single point mutations in the GSN gene will lead to loss of structure in residues 254–258 of the second domain. The misfold and associated increased flexibility opens up a cleavage site to the enzyme furin. Plasma gelsolin is cleaved as it passes through the Golgi before being secreted from the cell. A 68 kDa C-terminal fragment is further endoproteolysed into 5 and 8 kDa fragments that are amyloidogenic.

The most common mutations are D187N/Y (G654A/T on gene GSN, chromosome 9) with additional reports of G167R, N184K, P432R, A551P, and Ala7fs in the medical literature.

== Names ==
Many names exist in the scientific literature in reference to this disease including:

- Familial amyloid neuropathy type IV
- Familial amyloidotic polyneuropathy (FAP) type IV
- Lattice corneal dystrophy, gelsolin type
- Lattice corneal dystrophy type 2 (LCD2)
- Meretoja's syndrome

== See also ==
- Wrinkly skin syndrome
- List of cutaneous conditions
- Finnish heritage disease
- Plasma gelsolin
