= No, They Can't =

2012 book by John Stossel

No, They Can't: Why Government Fails – But Individuals Succeed
- Author: John Stossel
- Language: English
- Genre: Politics, economics
- Publisher: Threshold Editions
- Publication date: April 10, 2012
- Publication place: United States
- Media type: Hardcover
- Pages: 338
- ISBN: 1451640943

No, They Can't: Why Government Fails – But Individuals Succeed is a 2012 book by John Stossel, the American consumer reporter, investigative journalist, author and libertarian columnist. It was published on April 10, 2012, and focuses on what Stossel sees as the failures of government intervention.

== Summary ==
Stossel argues that "he has dismantled society's fat cows with unerring common sense. Now he debunks the most sacred of them all: our intuition and belief that government can solve our problems." The term "no, they can't" is a rebuttal to the chant used in Barack Obama's 2008 presidential campaign ("Yes we can").

The book gives several examples of government intervention: trade barriers, food and medical regulation, the education system, labor unions, gun control, minimum wage laws, the war on drugs, and advocates of universal health care. Stossel heavily criticizes economic egalitarianism, stating that an incentive for innovation is a higher income. Many of the statements in the book were later reiterated in episodes of Stossel.

== Reception ==
No, They Can't entered The New York Times Best Seller list at number 17 in the April 29, 2012, issue. Robert VerBruggen of the National Review and The Washington Times said that the book was "a perfect gift for a libertarian to give a friend or family member who has liberal instincts, so long as those instincts are accompanied by an open mind." A television special was created to accompany the book, first shown on April 15, 2012. Stossel went on a twenty-day tour to promote the book; the eighth day of the tour was filmed as an episode of Stossel.
