= Yelm School District =

School district in Washington, United States

Coordinates: 46°56′33″N 122°36′21″W

Yelm Community Schools

Address
- 107 1st Street N PO Box 476, Yelm, WA 98597 Thurston County, Washington United States

District information
- Grades: PK–12
- Superintendent: Chris Woods
- Enrollment: 5,524 (2025)

Yelm Community Schools, District No. 2 (YCS), is a public school district in Thurston County, Washington, United States, which serves the city of Yelm.

In the 2025-26 school year, Yelm School District had a student enrollment of 5,524.

== Location ==
Yelm Community Schools covers 193 square miles (499.9 km^{2}) of land in southeastern Thurston County and part of southwestern Pierce County, including nearly all of the City of Yelm.

== History ==
=== Establishment ===
In February of 1951, voters approved the consolidation of Collins School District No. 12 and Yelm School District No. 400 at a special election, forming Yelm School District No. 2 on July 1, 1951. Previous consolidations that composed the former Yelm School District No. 400 were as follows;

- In April of 1910, voters approved the consolidation of Yelm School District No. 13, Willow Lawn School District No. 40, Eureka School District No. 43, Pollard School District No. 66, and Lake Lawrence School District No. 69 at a special election, forming Yelm School District No. 301.
- On May 16, 1921, voters approved the consolidation of Lindstrom School District No. 70 and Yelm School District No. 301 at a special election, forming Yelm School District No. 309 on July 1, 1921.
  - Lindstrom School District No. 70 was the product of an earlier consolidation of School District Nos. 57 and 58.
- In February of 1942, voters approved the consolidation of Lackamas School District No. 305 and Yelm School District No. 309 of Thurston County, and McKenna School District No. 341 of Pierce County at a special election, forming Yelm School District No. 400 on July 1, 1942, becoming the first joint (multi-county) school district within both counties.
  - Lackamas School District No. 305 was formed on July 1, 1917 following the voter-approved consolidation of Moorehead School District No. 28, Sherlock School District No. 34, and John Longmire School District No. 53 at a special election held on May 29, 1917. Depending on the source, Bald Hills School District No. 72 may have been a component district that consolidated to form School District No. 305.

=== Levy failures ===
In February and April of 2024, voters turned down two separate local school levy measures. As a result, the district reduced staffing by more than 200 positions. Class sizes increased across schools, and some student programs became more reliant on fundraising.

In February of 2025, another school levy measure did not pass. District officials cited ongoing funding constraints related to the failed levies. Some parents and community members raised concerns regarding academic performance, budget transparency, and curriculum content.

== Schools ==
Elementary Schools
Name	Grade Levels	Established	Enrollment (2025-26)	Mascot
Fort Steven's	K–5	1990	444	Eagles
Lackamas	K-5	1894	304	-
McKenna	K-5	1890	379	Mountain Lions
Mill Pond	K-5	1993	363	Wolves
Southworth	K-5	1972	672	Stars
Prairie	PK–5	1984	365	Panthers

Middle Schools
Name	Grade Levels	Established	Enrollment (2025-26)	Mascot
Ridgeline	6-8	2006	583	Storms
Yelm	6-8	-	680	Whirlwinds

High Schools
Name	Grade Levels	Established	Enrollment (2025-26)	Mascot	WIAA Classification
Yelm High School	9-12	1920	1,622	Tornados	4A
Yelm Extension School	9-12	1978	109	Bulldogs	-

== Other facilities ==
- District headquarters located at 107 1st Street NE, Yelm, WA 98597, acquired in 2004.
- Transportation center at 202 Stevens Street NE, Yelm, WA 98597, acquired in 2010.
- Facility maintenance offices at 16525 100th Way SE, Yelm, WA 98597, constructed in 2020, adjacent to Fort Stevens Elementary.
