= Nisqually Valley News =

Weekly newspaper

- Type: Weekly newspaper
- Owner: CT Publishing LLC
- Founder(s): Elmer K. Fristoe; Sam Sparks
- Editor: Jessica Keller
- Founded: 1922
- Language: English
- Headquarters: 401 Creek St. SE Ste B Yelm, Washington 98597
- Circulation: 4,000 (as of 2022)
- OCLC number: 18338016
- Website: yelmonline.com

The Nisqually Valley News is a weekly newspaper based in Yelm in Thurston County, Washington. The newspaper is published weekly on Thursdays with a circulation of 4,000.

== History ==
The Nisqually Valley News was first published in February 1922. The editor at that time was Sam Sparks. The newspaper was originally independent and published by O.K. Press Company. Another News founder was Elmer Keller Fristoe, a traveling advertising salesman who settled in Yelm following WWI. Fristoe's son-in-law Don Miller took over the business around 1955 after Fristoe suffered a stroke.

Fristoe was made an honorary lifetime member by the Washington Newspaper Publishers Association and he served as Yelm mayor for ten years. He died in 1964 after owning the paper for 42 years. In 1994, Don and Charlotte Miller sold the News to Lafromboise Newspapers. In 2020, the paper was sold by Jenifer Lafromboise of Lafromboise Communications, Inc. to Chad and Coralee Taylor, who own The Silver Agency in Chehalis.

== Censorship ==
In 2007, a Washington superior court judge in Pierce County approved a prior restraint order that censored a story the News planned to run on a Roy city councilwoman investigated by police for criminal assistance and obstructing a public servant. The gag order was dropped a few days later after state Attorney General Rob McKenna intervened. The judge later apologized to the paper.
