= Ramtha's School of Enlightenment =

American New Age spiritual sect school

- Founded: 1988
- Founder: J. Z. Knight
- Location: Yelm, Washington, U.S.
- Coordinates: 46°57′21″N 122°38′02″W
- Staff: 80 (2014)
- Website: www.ramtha.com

Ramtha's School of Enlightenment (RSE) is an American New Age spiritual sect near the city of Yelm, Washington, U.S. The school was established in 1988 by J. Z. Knight, who claims to channel a 35,000-year-old being called Ramtha the Enlightened One. The school's teachings are based on channeling sessions. Critics consider the organisation to be a cult.

== History ==
In 1988, J. Z. Knight founded Ramtha's School of Enlightenment (RSE), then called Ramtha's School of Enlightenment: The American Gnostic School, on her 80-acre (32 ha) estate in Yelm, Washington. A division of Knight's company JZK, Inc., the school had around 80 staff members as of 2014. According to RSE's website, it is an "academy of the mind that offers retreats and workshops to people of all ages and cultures". RSE's private, fenced compounds are only open to staff members and students, not to the public.

Many students in Ramtha's School of Enlightenment sent money to the scam Omega Trust, although Knight did not endorse or promote the program. In 1998, Yelm resident and former Ramtha student Shaini Goodwin learned of Omega from a friend, and purchased two units. By November 1999 she was posting reports on the Internet under the pseudonym "Dove of Oneness", identifying as an Omega investor who awaited her "prosperity deliveries" from the program. As Omega lenders became more conspiratorial and paranoid about the delay of their payouts, Goodwin's "information" about Omega grew popular. By 2000, she attributed the Omega delays to a conflict between "White Knights" and "the dark agenda". After the August 2000 indictments, Goodwin assured her followers that the case would be unable to prevent funding. She warned that lenders who read about, or cooperated with, the investigation could lose their payout.

In 2004, various Ramtha school leaders joined community groups to strongly oppose a proposed 75,000-seat NASCAR racetrack in Yelm. The proposal was withdrawn. In 2007, Knight's profits from the school's activities and from sale of books, tapes, CDs and DVDs had reportedly been around $2.6 million. In 2008, lessons were given to the public in more than 20 countries, including the Czech Republic, Romania and Chile for the first time.

In 2011, Knight stated (while at the RSE supposedly channeling Ramtha), "Fuck God’s chosen people! I think they have earned enough cash to have paid their way out of the goddamned gas chambers by now", and said that Mexican people "breed like rabbits" and are "poison", that all gay men used to be Catholic priests, and that organic farmers have bad hygiene. In 2012, videos of this were placed on the Internet by ex-students of Knight's and by the Freedom Foundation.

== Teachings ==
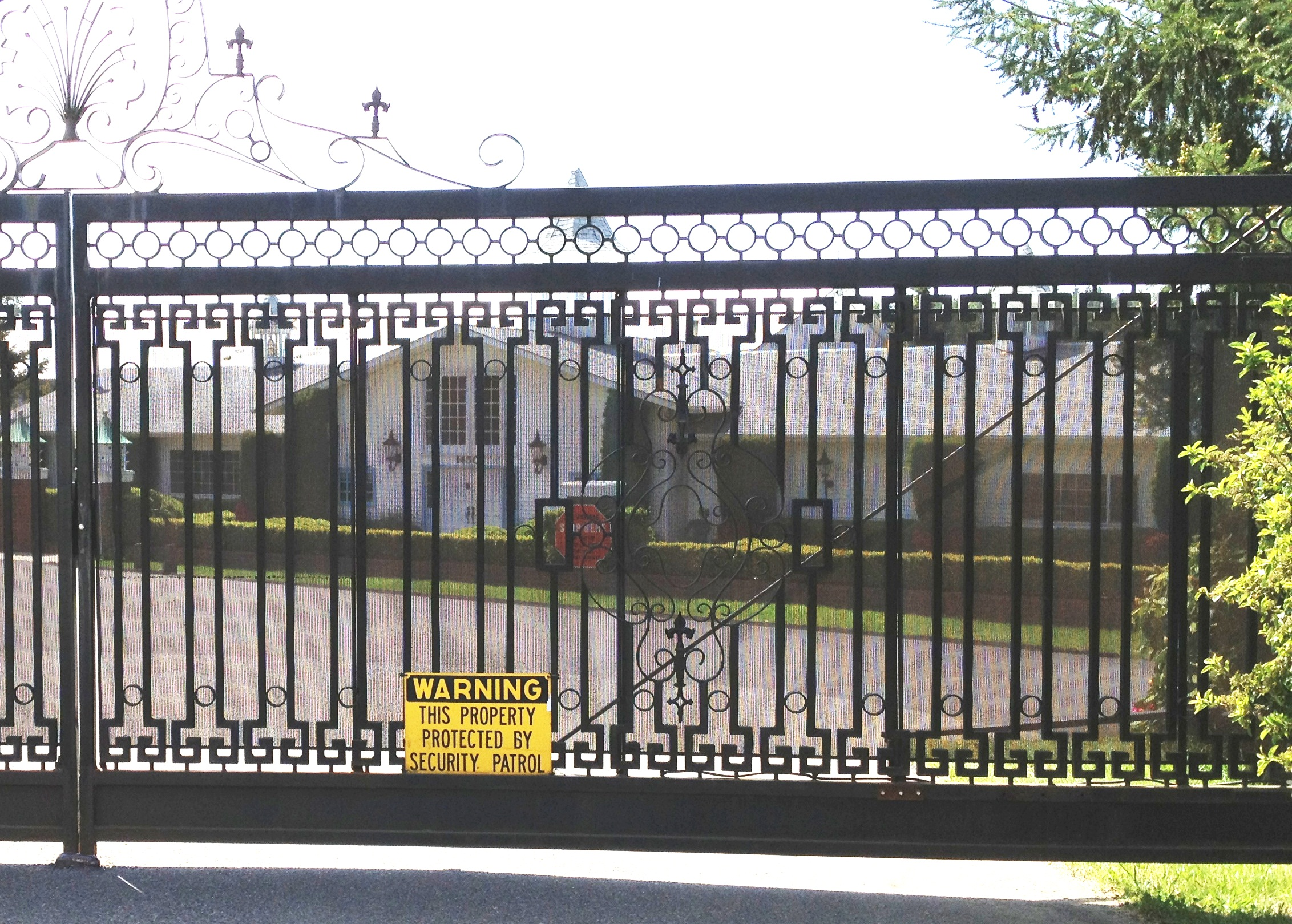
Gate to Ramtha's School of Enlightenment northwest of Yelm, Washington

The school teaches that human beings have the capacity to utilize their inner wisdom, focus their brains, and create their own reality. The school's curriculum is based on the supposed channelings by Knight of the entity Ramtha. Although the school has been criticised for being a cult (see below), Knight and her followers deny such claims and say that the school is neither a religion nor a cult.

Ramtha's School of Enlightenment teachings have been described as part of the New Age movement (the school itself claims to be outside it).

Lessons in the school's compounds sometimes include wine drinking, tobacco pipe smoking, and dancing to rock and roll music. Allegedly, it is being taught that the nitric oxide in red wine (not the alcohol), also found in pipe tobacco (not the nicotine), can help to facilitate changes in the brain as a part of the process in which to achieve these means.

Through various focus techniques, the students believe they are on their way to becoming as "enlightened" as other shamans who can alter their personal reality at will. The main activities towards that goal vary from specific focusing, meditation-like techniques, breathing techniques, blindfolded archery, energy healing (for one's self and for someone else), finding the heart of a maze, and many more. The students are taught that human beings can train themselves into such powers that will allow them to levitate, raise the dead, make gold appear in their hand and predict the future. Eventually this may lead to the "ascension" of the physical body into the "light body".

The dialogues, and a lot of transcripts from Knight's Ramtha talks, have been compiled and published over the course of many years. Videotapes of various dialogue sessions have also been released. While some major themes in the school's teachings are covered in these publications, more in-depth and systematic presentation of its philosophies and teachings is only accessible by attending a retreat in person.

== Research ==
In February 1997, Knight hosted a conference of scholars who had been studying her, the students and the school for the previous year. During their research phase, they also observed Knight's Ramtha sessions and measured various physiological functions of her body. The researchers examined Ramtha's teachings and the school's practices from a variety of perspectives, including physics, feminism, parapsychology and religion. J. Gordon Melton organized the research. In addition to the conference presenters, Knight invited the media to attend. However, Knight said she did not sponsor the conference to gain publicity or to convince her skeptics.

Knight paid the travel expenses and stipends for the conference presenters, which caused some of Knight's critics to suggest she had influenced their research. The researchers denied this contention to the press and, according to the Seattle Post-Intelligencer, "were offended by a suggestion that the New Age spiritualist could have tried to buy their support".

== Controversy and criticism ==
Ramtha's School of Enlightenment is considered to be a cult by various people, including her former husband Jeff Knight, former personal bodyguard Glen Cunningham, former students of the school (such as David McCarthy or Joe Szimhart), and skeptic Michael Shermer. Melton's book, which denies the school's status as a cult, has been criticized for siding with the school and not providing a neutral description of what is going on within the school. He has also been called a "cult apologist" by various opposers of cults. His position was further criticized when he took the stand as a witness in the case of Knight v. Knight (1992–1995) against Jeff Knight (JZ Knight's husband at the time), by further supporting that the school is not a cult.

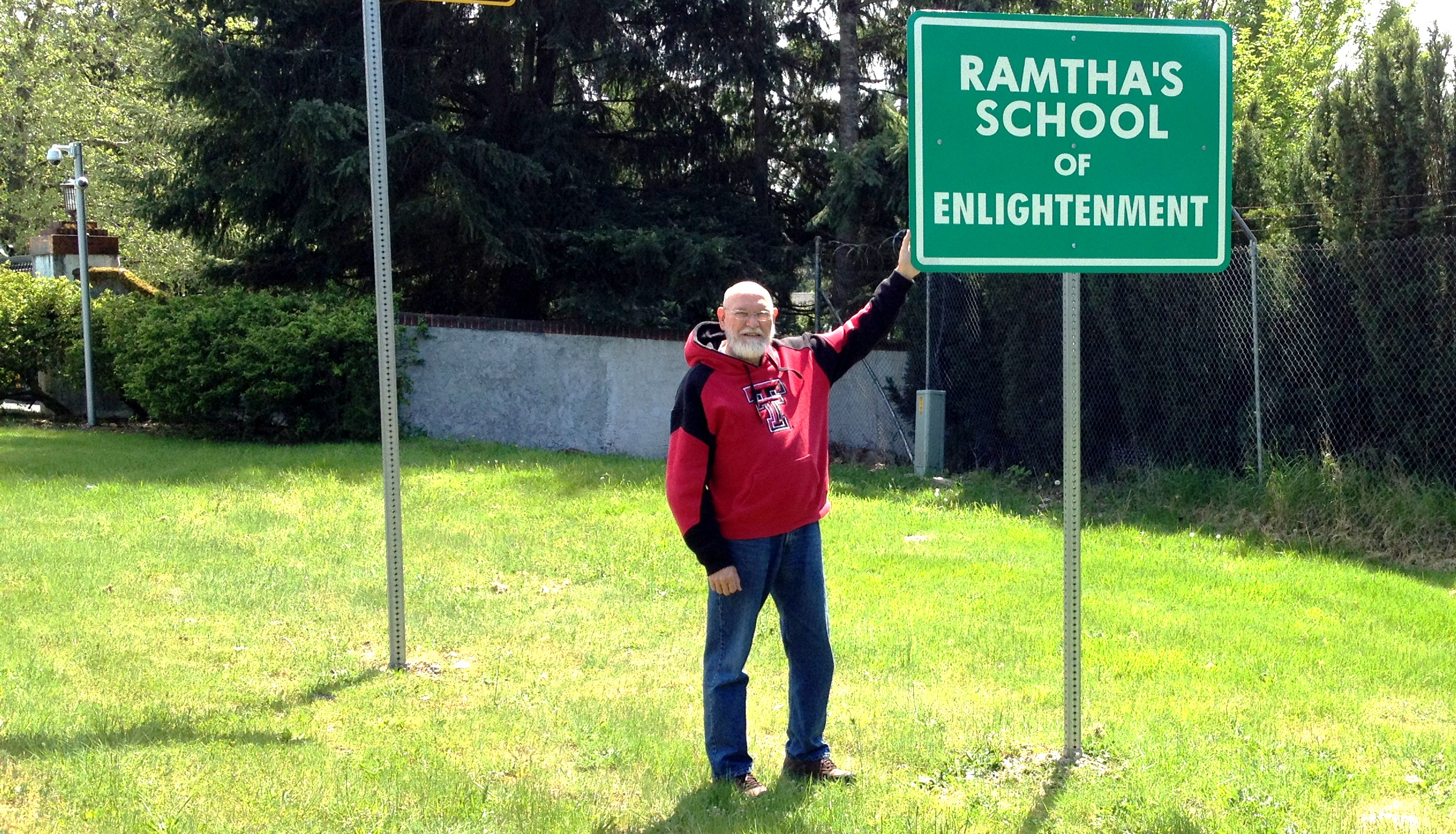
Sign along WA 510. The entrance to Ramtha's School of Enlightenment is in the background on the left.

Former students of the school have accused the RSE of practicing brain-washing and mind-control, as well as using intimidation and fear techniques to keep students in the school. David McCarthy, a student of the RSE between 1989 and 1996, calls Knight a "spiritual predator", and he mentions various parts of the teachings which had an intimidative character, such as the prophecy that unless students remain faithful to Ramtha, they will become prey of the "lizard people", and that the ancient figure of Jehovah would return to earth accompanied by lizard people, in a spaceship. The former students (including David McCarthy and Joe Szimhart) have formed an online community, Life After RSE (LARSE), to provide support for people who have quit the school and find themselves lost.

A further controversial issue regarding the Ramtha teachings involve the so-called "days to come", which were prophesied earth changes. Instructions reputed as coming from Ramtha were given to the students, telling them to leave the cities, find a place in the country to grow their own food and become sovereign or self-sufficient. Another instruction told to students was to build underground shelters to protect themselves and their families.

Various incidents within the school's grounds have been characterized as controversial. Glen Cunningham, in an interview with David McCarthy, describes how, one evening, Knight suggested that all students should stay there overnight because she said it would be "good for the energy". That was before the Great Arena (formerly used as horse stables) had been floored, and as a result there would be a lot of dust in the air. Cunningham says that there was a very old woman among the students, who begged him that she did not want to do this and she wanted to go home, but Ramtha said that she could stay under the protection of Ramtha and her bodyguard. Leaving the arena the following day, the old woman died of pneumonia (due to the dust in the air and humidity).

Another incident which is mentioned by both Cunningham and Joe Szimhart is the practice of running blindfolded in a large fenced field. Szimhart mentions in particular an occasion around the year 1990, in which about 1,000 blindfolded students were directed to split up and run across the field, with their hands in the "Consciousness & Energy" position in front of them, and the exercise was meant to help the students overcome their fears. Szimhart recalls how many people crashed into each other, and that there were some injuries. A customer of his ended up with a deeply bruised shoulder and a big lump on his forehead. Aside from the minor injuries, a few people had to be treated at the hospital.

In May 2022 near Spinello, Italy, a small city believed to be blessed by Knight, an Italian couple allegedly affiliated with the School committed suicide in their self-built bunker. The School noted that the couple had not attended any events in ten years and questioned the connection since suicide does not reflect the philosophy of the school which "celebrates life". The Prosecutor's Office in Forlì investigated the case and found no reason to suspect the suicides were linked to RSE.

== Related projects ==
In 2004, three members of the RSE produced a controversial film that combined documentary interviews and a fictional narrative to posit a connection between science and spirituality, called What the Bleep Do We Know!?. The film has been criticized by the scientific community due to its misrepresentation of quantum physics, and an unnecessary connection to consciousness. The American Chemical Society's review criticizes the film as a "pseudoscientific docudrama", saying "Among the more outlandish assertions are that people can travel backward in time, and that matter is actually thought."

== See also ==
- Anti-cult movement
- New Religious Movement
- Pseudoskepticism
- Skepticism
