= North Yelm, Washington =

- CDP
- Location of North Yelm, Washington
- Coordinates: 46°57′32″N 122°35′48″W
- Country: United States
- State: Washington
- County: Thurston

Area
  - Total: 3.4 sq mi (8.8 km^{2})
  - Land: 3.4 sq mi (8.8 km^{2})
  - Water: 0 sq mi (0.0 km^{2})
- Elevation: 300 ft (90 m)

Population (2020)
  - Total: 3,140
  - Density: 826/sq mi (318.8/km^{2})
- Time zone: UTC-8 (Pacific (PST))
  - Summer (DST): UTC-7 (PDT)
- ZIP code: 98597
- Area codes: 360, 564
- FIPS code: 53-50210
- GNIS feature ID: 1867625

North Yelm is a census-designated place (CDP) in Thurston County, Washington, United States. The population was 3,140 at the 2020 census. The community borders Yelm and is situated near the intersection of Washington State Route 507 and SR 510.

== Geography ==
According to the United States Census Bureau, the CDP has a total area of 3.4 square miles (8.8 km^{2}), all of it land.

== Demographics ==
Historical population
Census	Pop.	Note	%±
1990	2,075		—
2000	2,793		34.6%
2010	2,906		4.0%
2020	3,140		8.1%
U.S. Decennial Census; 2020 Census

As of the census of 2000, there were 2,793 people, 1,006 households, and 751 families residing in the CDP. The population density was 825.6 people per square mile (319.0/km^{2}). There were 1,100 housing units at an average density of 325.2/sq mi (125.7/km^{2}). The racial makeup of the CDP was 89.5% White, 1.0% African American, 2.2% Native American, 1.5% Asian, 0.8% Pacific Islander, 1.2% from other races, and 3.9% from two or more races. Hispanic or Latino of any race were 4.0% of the population.

There were 1,006 households, out of which 36.8% had children under the age of 18 living with them, 57.0% were married couples living together, 13.2% had a female householder with no husband present, and 25.3% were non-families. 19.7% of all households were made up of individuals, and 6.8% had someone living alone who was 65 years of age or older. The average household size was 2.78 and the average family size was 3.11.

In the CDP, the age distribution of the population shows 29.2% under the age of 18, 7.5% from 18 to 24, 30.4% from 25 to 44, 21.4% from 45 to 64, and 11.5% who were 65 years of age or older. The median age was 35 years. For every 100 females, there were 98.6 males. For every 100 females age 18 and over, there were 97.7 males.

The median income for a household in the CDP was $36,833, and the median income for a family was $39,678. Males had a median income of $30,763 versus $22,310 for females. The per capita income for the CDP was $17,765. About 12.5% of families and 15.6% of the population were below the poverty line, including 25.0% of those under age 18 and none of those age 65 or over.
