= Yelm High School =

Location
- 1315 Yelm Avenue West; Yelm, Washington 98597; United States; 46°57′00″N 122°37′27″W

Information
- Type: Public secondary
- Established: 1920
- Principal: Curtis Cleveringa
- Teaching staff: 77.33 (on an FTE basis)
- Grades: 9-12
- Enrollment: 1,677 (2023-2024)
- Student to teacher ratio: 21.69
- Colors: Red, White & Black
- Nickname: Tornados
- Website: yelmhs.ycs.wednet.edu

Yelm High School is a public high school in Yelm, Washington, United States. It is part of the Yelm Community Schools. The Yelm High School also has sports, but most well-known as it's football team, Yelm "Tornados".

== Notable alumni ==
- Dennis Hallman - former professional mixed martial artist, formerly with the Ultimate Fighting Championship
