= The Power of Belief =

1998 ABC News Special

The Power of Belief was an ABC News Special aired on October 6, 1998, hosted by John Stossel. Stossel examines popular claims of therapeutic touch, psychic detectives, faith healing voodoo curses, channelling, and the media's lack of inquiry into pseudoscience.

The show included appearances from famous skeptics Michael Shermer, James Randi, and David Willey. New Age author JZ Knight, who claimed to channel a spiritual entity named "Ramtha," also appeared on the program, along with Susan Miller, John Monti, Ava Kay Jones, and Elmer Glover.

The episode contains video of the "world's longest firewalk" which included Stossel and Willey taking part.

Robert Todd Carroll called it "a very good survey of popular culture's fascination" with the paranormal. James Randi wrote "ABC-TV, in my opinion, did a really excellent job" with the show.
