= Centralia Canal =

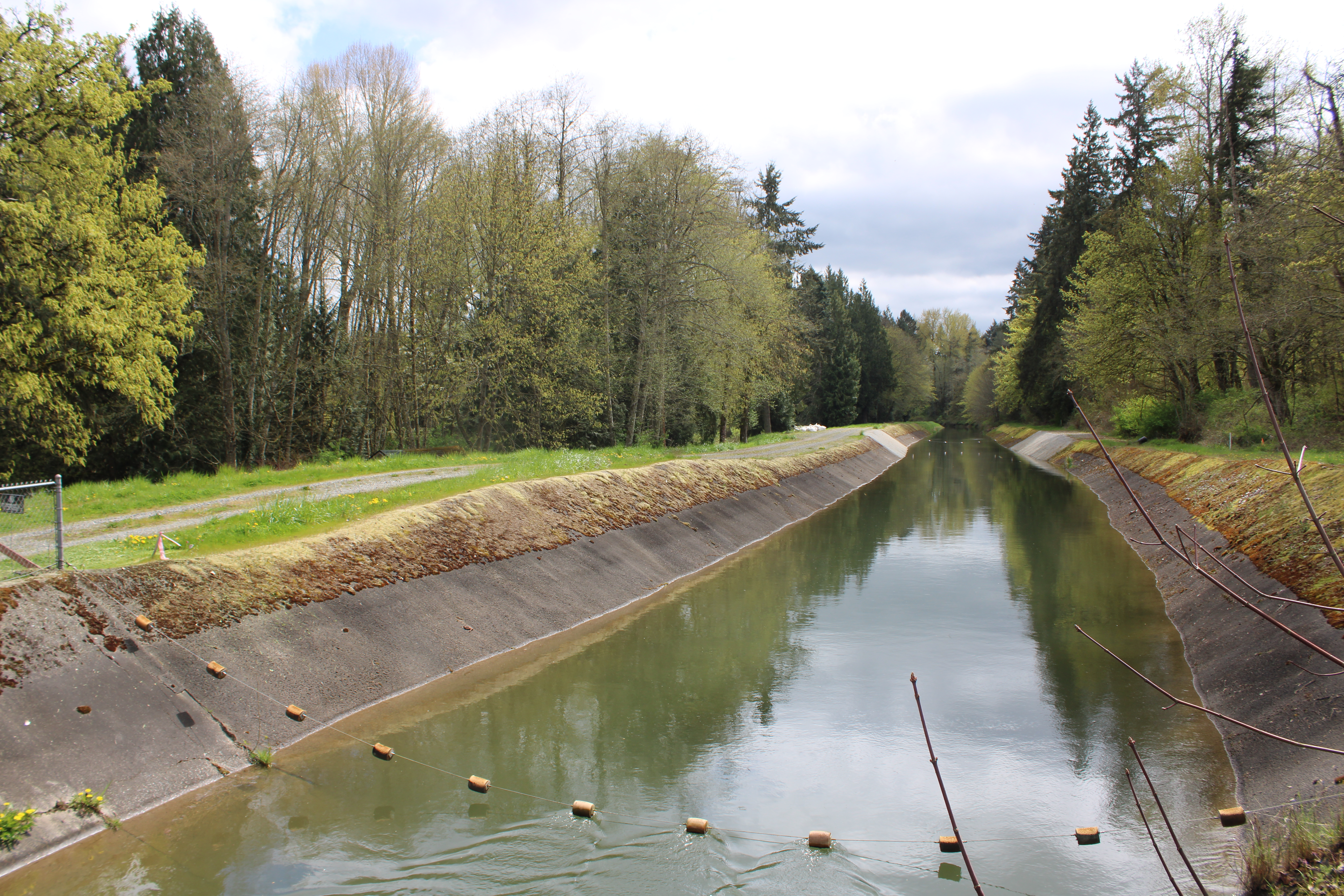
- Centralia Power Canal
- Interactive map of Centralia Canal
- Location: Near Yelm, Washington
- Country: United States
- Coordinates: 46.918°N 122.528°W

Specifications
- Length: 9 miles (14 km)

History
- Former names: Centralia Power Canal
- Date completed: 1929

Geography
- End point: Yelm Hydro Project
- Connects to: Nisqually River

The Centralia Canal, also known as Centralia Power Canal, is a canal in Thurston and Pierce counties, Washington, United States. The canal parallels the Nisqually River for 9 miles (14 km) in and around the city of Yelm. It was built in 1929 to supply water for the 12-megawatt Yelm hydroelectric project belonging to the city of Centralia's City Light Department.

Part of the canal runs through the Nisqually River Conservation Area, purchased in 2020 by the Nisqually Land Trust.
