= Plasma gelsolin =

Protein in the immune system

Plasma Gelsolin
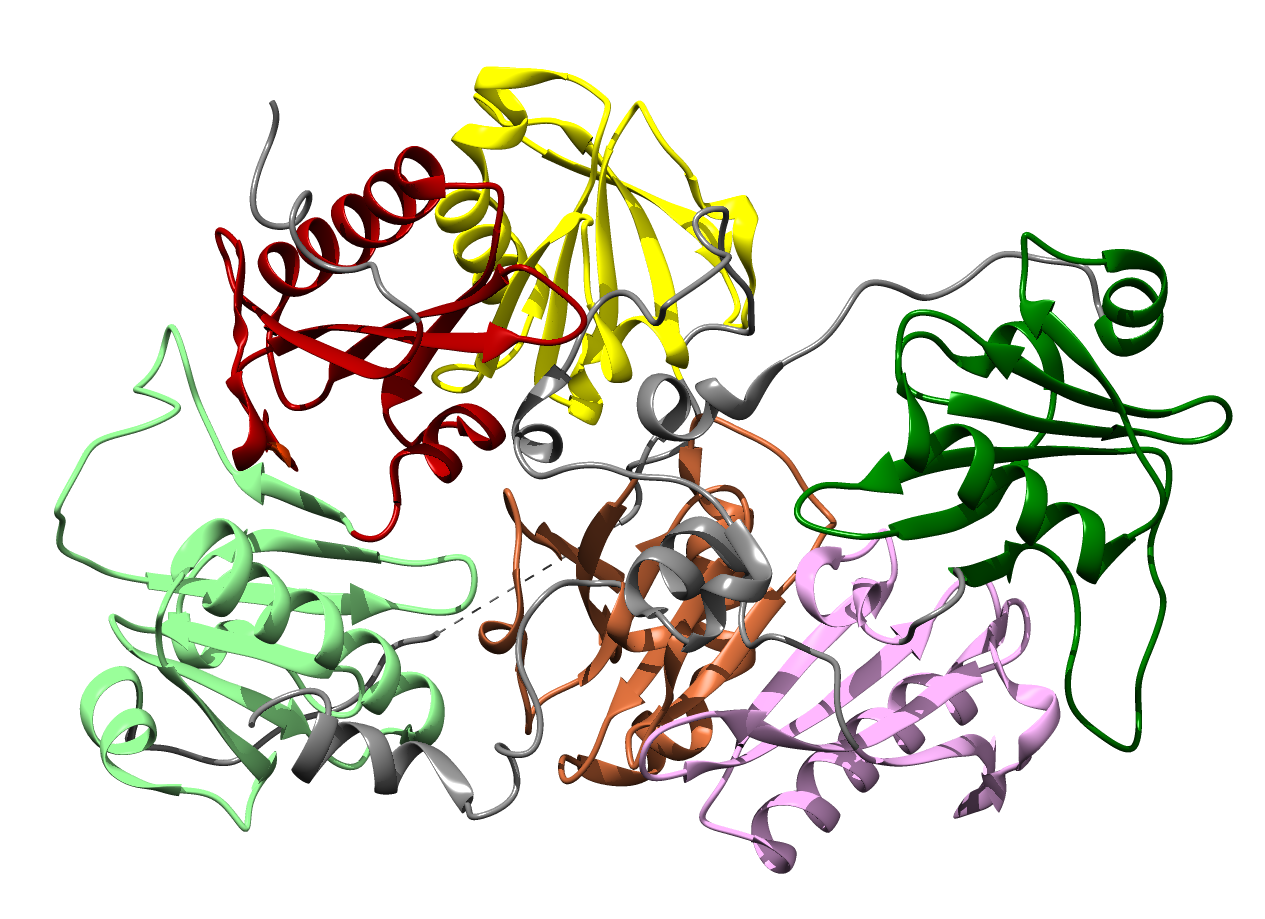
- Crystal structure of the cytoplasmic form of human Gelsolin (3FFN)

Identifiers
- Symbol: Plasma Gelsolin
- Pfam: PF00626
- Pfam clan: CL0092
- InterPro: IPR007123
- SCOP2: 1vil / SCOPe / SUPFAM
Available protein structures:
- PDB: 2FGH, 1H1V, 3CIP, 6QW3, 1D0N, 1KCQ, 1P8X, 3C15, 3FFN, 5DD2, 5UBO, 5ZZ0, 6LJK, 1C0F, 1EQY, 1ESV, 1RGI, 1YAG, 2FH1, 2FH2, 2FH3, 2FH4, 2LLF, 3FFK, 3TU5, 5FAE, 5FAF, 5H3M, 5H3N, 5O2Z, 6JCO, 6JEG, 6JEH, 6LJE, 6Q9R, 6Q9Z, 6QBF, 1SVY, 4CBX, 1D4X, 1MDU, 1NLV, 1NM1, 1NMD, 1NPH, 1P8Z, 1SOL, 1YVN, 2FF3, 2FF6, 3A5L, 3A5M, 3A5N, 3A5O, 3CJB, 3CJC, 5MVV, 1C0G IPR007123 PF00626 (ECOD; PDBsum)
- AlphaFold: IPR007123; PF00626

Plasma gelsolin (pGSN) is an 83 kDa abundant protein constituent of normal plasma and an important component of the innate immune system. The identification of pGSN in Drosophila melanogaster and C. elegans points to an ancient origin early in evolution. Its extraordinary structural conservation reflects its critical regulatory role in multiple essential functions. Its roles include the breakdown of filamentous actin released from dead cells, activation of macrophages, and localization of the inflammatory response. Substantial decreases in plasma levels are observed in acute and chronic infection and injury in both animal models and in humans. Supplementation therapies with recombinant human pGSN have been shown effective in more than 20 animal models.

pGSN has a cytoplasmic isoform (cGSN) known to be an actin-binding protein controlling cytoskeletal dynamics. cGSN is expressed from the same gene, and is identical to pGSN except for its lack of a 24 amino acid N-terminal extension.

== History ==
The cellular isoform of Gelsolin was discovered in 1979 in the lab of Thomas P. Stossel. Its name comes from observed calcium-dependent reversible gel-sol transitions of macrophage cytoplasmic extract. Around the same time a similarly sized plasma protein was discovered and shown to depolymerize actin; it was named Brevin, due to its ability to shorten actin filaments. In 1986 it was demonstrated that Brevin was identical to cellular Gelsolin except for a 24 AA N-terminal extension, and was renamed Plasma Gelsolin.

== Structure ==
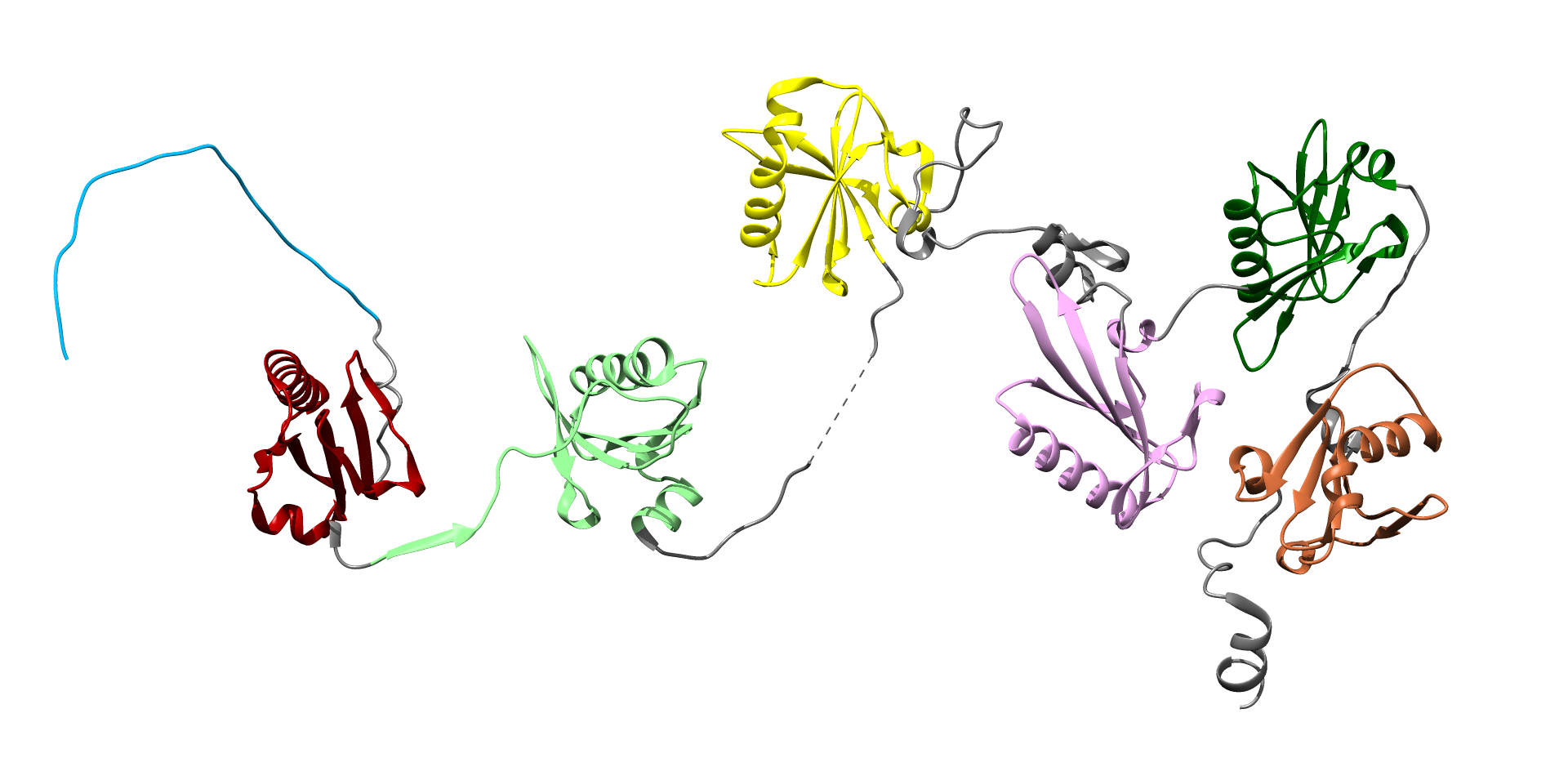
A solution phase representation of pGSN in the presence of Ca^{2+} adapted from 3FFN and low-resolution SAXS information. The 24 AA N-terminal extension unique to the plasma isoform was manually added (left, light blue); no structural information for it is known nor represented. Colors represent the six domains of Gelsolin.

Plasma Gelsolin is a 755 AA, 83 kDa plasma protein made up of six "gelsolin domains," each composed of a 5-6 strand β-sheet between one long and one short α-helix. It exhibits a weak homology between domains S1 and S4, S2 and S5, and S3 and S6, and is identical to the cytoplasmic form of the protein except for the addition of a 24 AA N-terminal extension. Additionally a 27 AA N-terminal signal peptide is cleaved prior to pGSN's secretion from the cell. Both forms of the protein are encoded by highly conserved genes on chromosome 9 in humans, but are under the control of different promoters. There is a single disulfide bond formed on the second domain of the plasma protein, there are no documented natural post-translational modifications, and the pI ≈ 6.

=== Isoforms and mutations ===
Aside from the cellular form, the only other known isoform is Gelsolin-3, an identical non-secreted protein containing an 11 AA, rather than 24 AA, N-terminal extension. It has been found in brain, testes, and lung oligodendrocytes, and is reportedly involved in myelin remodeling during spiralization around the axon.

Plasma Gelsolin is highly conserved, and its only known mutations are single point mutations. One of several such mutations leads to Finnish Familial Amyloidosis, a disorder in which pGSN becomes more conformationally flexible and susceptible to enzymatic cleavage resulting in accumulation of peptide fragments into amyloid fibrils. D187N/Y is the most common mutation with additional reports of G167R, N184K, P432R, A551P, and Ala7fs in the medical literature. In addition to this several mutations as well as down-regulation of the protein are associated with breast cancer.

=== Ca^{2+} ===
At moderate pH in the absence of Ca^{2+} pGSN is compact and globular. Low pH or the presence of >nM Ca^{2+} is associated with an elongated structure with greater backbone flexibility. This flexibility exposes the actin binding sites. Since physiological levels of Ca^{2+} are ~2 mM, pGSN is natively elongated and able to bind to leaked actin from cellular damage.

== Functions ==
=== Binding ===
Plasma Gelsolin is a sticky protein known to bind to a number of peptides and proteins: Actin (see: Relationships with actin), Apo-H, Aβ, α-Synuclein, Integrin, Tcp-1, Fibronectin, Syntaxin-4, Tropomyosin, fatty acids and phospholipids (see: Binding and inactivation of diverse inflammatory mediators): LPA, LPS (endotoxin), LTA, PAF, S1P, polyphosphoinositides including PIP_{2}; and nucleic acids: Ap3A, ATP, ADP. PIP_{2}, a phospholipid component of cell membranes, competes with ATP and actin for pGSN binding, and will dissociate F-Actin-capped pGSN.

=== Relationships with actin ===
==== Actin toxicity and removal ====
Actin is the most abundant cellular protein, and its release into extracellular fluid and circulation following cellular injury from disease or injury leads to increased blood viscosity, hindered microcirculation, and activation of platelets. Hemodialysis patients with low levels of pGSN and high levels of actin in blood had markedly higher mortality. Actin is a major component of biofilms that accumulate at local sites of injury and infection, impeding access of host immune components and therapeutics such as antibiotics. Biofilms are particularly pathogenic in the setting of foreign bodies like indwelling catheters and tissue implants.

Actin exchanges between monomeric (G) and filamentous (F) forms according to the concentrations of it, ATP, and cations. pGSN along with Vitamin D-binding protein (DBP) bind and clear monomeric actin. DBP binds with greater affinity to G-actin, leaving pGSN available to sever F-actin. Furthermore, DBP is capable of removing one actin from a 2:1 actin-pGSN complex, restoring its ability to sever F-actin. F-actin, severed and capped by pGSN, is removed by sinusoidal endothelial cells of the liver. pGSN removes 60% of actin trapped in fibrin clots in vitro leading to an increased rate of clot lysis.

==== Severing, capping, nucleation, and polymerization ====
Although pGSN is capable of initiating the polymerization of actin through nucleation, its primary relationship with it in blood is depolymerization through filament severing. Actin severing occurs rapidly in the presence of pGSN and Ca^{2+}. pGSN wraps around filaments, non-enzymatically cleaving them. It remains attached, "capping" the barbed/plus end of the severed filament and inducing a torsional twist that is cooperative through its length. Capping has a reported binding affinity <250 pM in the presence of Ca^{2+} that is substantially weakened in its absence. Capping also blocks further polymerization at the fast growing, barbed end.

While no evidence exists for nucleating/polymerizing of G-actin by pGSN in vivo, the ability of it to do so in vitro is well documented. Actin polymerization is initiated by the production of an actin trimer nucleus. Formation of nuclei is energetically disfavored, but dimers and/or trimers can be catalyzed/stabilized by a number of cellular proteins. In excess of a 2:1 actin:gelsolin stoichiometry and in the presence of Ca^{2+}, gelsolin will bind three actin monomers. A monomer adds to the trimer creating a tetramer that undergoes an internal conversion to an active tetramer witnessed by a concentration-independent lag phase. Subsequent fibrilization proceeds by monomer addition. Gelsolin remains attached to the fast-growing (barbed/plus) end of actin, producing short, slow-growing fibrils.

These actions are similar to those of cytoplasmic form of pGSN, cGSN, which contributes to structural changes of cells through both nucleating/polymerizing and severing/capping.

=== Amyloid prevention and clearance ===
pGSN may play an important role in the prevention and management of amyloidosis in several diseases. It is found in complex with Aβ in plasma and reported to both inhibit amyloid formation and defibrillize preformed fibrils in vitro. Mice with an Alzheimer's disease model given pGSN showed a 5-fold decrease in progression of Cerebral Amyloid Angiopathy. pGSN has also been found in Lewy Bodies, amyloid containing protein aggregates associated with Parkinson's disease and Dementia with Lewy bodies.

== Role in inflammation ==
=== Macrophage stimulation ===
==== MARCO receptor ====
Macrophage receptor MARCO is responsible for pathogen recognition and phagocytosis. Macrophages incubated with actin at concentrations consistent with lung injury showed decreased uptake of bacteria. Uptake was restored when actin was administered in the presence of pGSN.

==== NOS3 ====
NOS3 is an enzyme that is protective against systemic inflammation and myocardial dysfunction. pGSN activates phosphorylation of Ser^{1177} in NOS3 and Ser^{473} in Akt. NOS3 is known to be activated by phosphorylation of Akt. Mouse macrophage uptake and killing of bacteria in vitro was enhanced by pGSN, and no significant enhancement was found for NOS3^{-/-} macrophages. In vivo, mice showed 15-fold improvement in bacterial clearance when given pGSN, and no significant enhancement was found for NOS3^{-/-} mice.

=== Inflammatory mediators ===
pGSN has been shown to bind to the fatty acid inflammatory mediators LPA, LPS (endotoxin), LTA, PAF, S1P, and polyphosphoinositides including PIP_{2}. Mediators of inflammation, the body's innate healing mechanism, accumulate at the site of the injury to begin the processes of defense and repair, and the depletion of local pGSN allows them to do their work.

See Binding and inactivation of diverse inflammatory mediators

== Therapeutic potential ==
The broad therapeutic potential of pGSN supplementation resides in the fact that the molecule embodies a multifunctional system contributing importantly to innate immunity rather than a pharmacologic intervention with selective and specific activities.

Plasma gelsolin's primary function is to keep inflammation local and enhance the function of the innate immune system. It functions through a pleiotropic mechanism of action; severing toxic filamentous actin (F-actin), binding inflammatory mediators, and enhancing pathogen clearance. These mechanisms are quite distinct from other anti-inflammatory agents that function as antagonists of individual mediators or inhibitors of specific enzymes, and work to ablate inflammation. Most systemic anti-inflammatory agents also suppress the immune system and often require caution in administration because they increase the risk of infection. Plasma gelsolin is unique in that it has also been demonstrated to enhance the antimicrobial action of macrophages, which engulf and digest cellular debris and pathogens, boosting immunity against both gram positive and gram negative bacterial infections.

=== Mechanisms of action ===
Plasma gelsolin plays a central role in the body's innate immune system and is responsible for localizing inflammation—a mechanism so central to species survival that it has been highly conserved by evolution. Experimental and epidemiology data suggest that pGSN performs the role of a buffer or shield that modulates the inflammatory response to injury or infection. The system accomplishes this goal in three key ways described below:

==== Debridement ====
Plasma gelsolin binds and severs filamentous actin exposed from cells damaged by injury, including both infectious and sterile injury. Actin has been reported to activate platelets, interfere with fibrinolysis, damage endothelial cells, and to function as a danger signal (DAMP). Administration of large quantities of filamentous actin to rats resulted in lethal pulmonary hemorrhage and thrombosis.

Another key "toxicity" of exposed actin is the fact that it is a major component of biofilms that accumulate at local sites of injury and infection, and that it impedes the access of host immune components and therapeutics such as antibiotics. Biofilms are particularly pathogenic in the setting of foreign bodies like indwelling catheters and tissue implants. As a result of actin exposure at the local site of injury, the local level of plasma gelsolin around the site of the injury initially becomes depleted as it "debrides" the local involved site. Mediators of inflammation, the body's innate healing mechanism, accumulate at the site of the injury to begin the processes of defense and repair, and the depletion of local plasma gelsolin allows them to do their work. While local pGSN levels are depressed, the presence of this abundant protein in the circulation ensures that the inflammatory process stays local, and that stores of plasma gelsolin are available to address further injury so that the overall immune response remains intact.

==== Augmentation of macrophage antimicrobial activity ====
pGSN has antimicrobial activity in vitro and in vivo. Administration of pGSN subcutaneously or by inhalation to mice challenged with lethal inocula of S. pneumoniae or even more lethal combinations of influenza virus and bacteria markedly diminished the number of viable bacteria in the animals' airways and significantly reduced mortality. The number of inflammation-inducing neutrophils was also considerably reduced, presumably as a result of enhanced bacterial clearance. This is true for contemporaneous or delayed administration of recombinant pGSN.

A basis of pGSN's antimicrobial action is that it enhances the ability of cultivated lung macrophages to ingest gram positive and gram negative bacteria. This has been demonstrated in vitro. Improved phagocytosis is the product of pGSN debriding actin bound to macrophage scavenger receptors preventing their function. pGSN also increases the ability of macrophages to kill ingested microorganisms by inducing macrophage nitric oxide synthase activity.

==== Binding and inactivation of diverse inflammatory mediators ====
pGSN binds to a number of inflammatory mediators and signaling agents. Binding to LPA occurs at the same site on the molecule that ligates actin and interacts with polyphosphoinositides. Subsequent studies showed that gelsolin alters the effector function of LPA's receptor binding. Binding to inflammatory mediators, and in some cases inhibition of their effector function, has been shown for platelet-activating factor, lipopolysaccharide endotoxin, sphingosine-1-phosphate, and lipoteichoic acid and small molecule purinergic agonists including ATP and ADP. The binding of pGSN to Aβ Alzheimer peptide has also been well documented.

Role of mediators which bind to plasma gelsolin
| Mediator | Role |
|---|---|
| LPA | A phospholipid derivative that can act as a signaling molecule and activates G protein coupled receptors. It has been associated with cell proliferation. |
| LPS/endotoxin | Found in the outer membrane of Gram-negative bacteria, it elicits a strong immune response in animals. |
| PAF | A potent phospholipid activator and mediator of many leukocyte functions, including platelet aggregation, inflammation, and anaphylaxis. It is produced in response to specific stimuli by a variety of cell types, including neutrophils, basophils, platelets, and endothelial cells. |
| Aβ | A peptide of 36–43 amino acids that is the main constituent of amyloid plaques in the brains of Alzheimer's disease patients. |
| LTA | A major constituent of the cell wall of Gram-positive bacteria able to stimulate a specific immune response in animals. |
| S1P | A blood borne lipid mediator and major regulator of vascular and immune systems. In the vascular system, S1P regulates angiogenesis, vascular stability, and permeability. In the immune system it is recognized as a major regulator of trafficking of T-cells and B-cells. Inhibition of S1P receptors has been shown to be critical for immunomodulation. |

=== Anti-microbial resistance ===
Antimicrobial resistance is a global threat that leads to an estimated 700,000 deaths annually with projections of 10M deaths per year and lost economic potential of $100T by 2050. The United States has released a national action plan to combat antibiotic resistant bacteria.

Recombinant pGSN (rhu-pGSN) supplementation alone shows improved survival and decreased bacteria counts in several mouse models. The bactericidal activity of the antimicrobial peptide LL-37 was shown to be inhibited by F-actin. It formed bundles with F-actin in vitro that were dissolved by pGSN, restoring bactericidal activity. Bacteria growth was reduced when pGSN was added cystic fibrosis sputum, which is known to contain F-actin.

When mice were given a penicillin-resistant strain of pneumococcal pneumonia, penicillin had no effect on mortality or morbidity. rhu-pGSN improved both mortality and morbidity on its own, and the combination of rhu-pGSN and penicillin gave further improvement of both suggesting possible synergism.

=== Levels of the Protein ===
Plasma gelsolin is produced and secreted by virtually every cell type with muscle contributing the largest amount. At normal levels of >200 mg/L, it is a highly abundant protein in the circulation.

Decreased levels are often associated with ill health and disease. A growing list of insults showing loss of pGSN includes COVID-19, pneumonia, sepsis, SIRS, traumatic brain injury, autoimmune diseases, chronic kidney disease, HIV-1 disease, tick-borne encephalitis and Lyme, malaria, hepatitis, burns, multiple organ dysfunction syndrome, trauma associated with injury or surgery, bone marrow transplantation, and multiple sclerosis. Severely depleted levels (<150 mg/L) strongly correlate with the onset of systemic inflammatory dysregulation and predict increased morbidity and mortality across a broad spectrum of clinical presentations in the critical care setting. The magnitude of decline in pGSN correlates with the likelihood of mortality in seriously ill patients.

Mediators of inflammation, the body's innate healing mechanism, accumulate at the site of the injury to begin the processes of defense and repair, and the depletion of local plasma gelsolin allows them to do their work. As a result of actin exposure at the local site of injury, the local level of plasma gelsolin around the site of the injury initially becomes depleted as it "debrides" the local involved site (see: Debridement). While local pGSN levels are depressed, the presence of this abundant protein in the circulation ensures that the inflammatory process stays local, and that stores of plasma gelsolin are available to address further injury so that the overall immune response remains intact (see: Binding and inactivation of diverse inflammatory mediators).

Measured levels are higher in serum than plasma due to pGSN's affinity for fibrin.

=== Animal studies ===
Human plasma gelsolin has been produced in recombinant form in E. coli (rhu-pGSN), and its efficacy as a therapeutic has been studied in vivo in a number of animal models of inflammatory disease. In models of injury that cause actin release and inflammatory organ damage, pGSN levels consistently drop. In models where gelsolin levels are replenished, adverse outcomes can be prevented. To date, rhu-pGSN has been studied in many independent laboratories providing evidence of efficacy in >20 animal models. Following are descriptions of selected animal studies. All stated results are relative to those of placebo treatments.

Summary of clinical results from selected animal studies
| Disease | Model | Results |
|---|---|---|
| influenza | mouse | Mice given a highly lethal form of influenza show increased survival at 12 day end of study point as well as decreased morbidity and decreased expression of pro-inflammatory genes when rhu-pGSN is administered 3 to 6 days after infection. |
| pneumococcal pneumonia | mouse | Mice were given pneumococcal challenge 7 days after being given influenza. Supplementation of endogenous pGSN with rhu-pGSN improved bacterial clearance 15-fold, reduced neutrophilic inflammation, improved recovery of initial weight loss, and showed a dose-dependent improvement on survival. No antibiotics were given, demonstrating pGSN's ability to stimulate the innate immune response. |
| burn | rat | Rats receiving 40% body surface area burn showed 90% loss of endogenous pGSN within 12 hours and slowly recovered to almost 50% after 6 days. Intravenous administration of rhu-pGSN partially or totally prevented the burn-associated increase in pulmonary microvascular permeability in a dose-dependent manner. See also |
| sepsis | mouse | Mice were intraperitoneally injected with endotoxin (LPS) or subjected to cecal ligation and puncture (CLP) (a small amount of intestinal contents were extracted into the cavity and the wound was sutured). Endogenous pGSN levels dropped to 50% post-challenge. Survival substantially improved with rhu-pGSN treatment in both groups: LPS study, 90% vs 0%; CLP study: 30% vs 0%. |
| sepsis | rat | Relative to a previous mouse study a smaller dosage of rhu-pGSN decreased morbidity in a double CLP sepsis model relative to sham treatments. The dosage was effective in intraveneous and subcutaneous injections, but less so with intraperitoneal injection (qualitative but not statistically significant) despite the latter being the site of injury. This evidenced the need for systemic availability of pGSN for recovery. |
| Acute respiratory distress syndrome | mouse | Mice were subjected to 95% O_{2} for 72 hr and treated with rhu-pGSN after 24 and 48 hr. Hyperoxia produced severe diffuse congestion and edema with hemorrhage visible in lung histopathology, 70% reduction in endogenous pGSN, and an influx of neutrophils. Treatment with rhu-pGSN led to a 23% decrease in the authors' histopathological score, 65% decrease in BAL fluid neutrophil count, and a 29% reduction in an overall acute lung injury score. |
| stroke | rat | Researchers induced middle cerebral artery occlusion with a direct injection of Endothelin 1, a vasoconstrictor. Animals treated with pGSN at the site of injury exhibited 50% infarction area, >2x use of both forepaws during exploration, and a decrease in whisker-stimulated reaction time (9 s, pGSN treated; 19 s untreated; 1 s healthy rat). |
| multiple sclerosis | mouse | Mice with experimental autoimmune encephalomyelitis show decreased levels of pGSN in blood and increased levels in the brain. All rhu-pGSN-treated mice survived whereas 60% of control died within 30 days. Rhu-pGSN mice scored significantly better on clinical scores, smaller brain lesions imaged by MRI, less extra-cellular actin, and decreased myeloperoxidase activity. |
| Alzheimer's | mouse | Two models of Alzheimer's were tested. Treatment mice that were tail-injected with a plasmid encoding human pGSN showed reduction in Aβ_{42} in brain tissue, decreased amyloid, and increased concentration of microglia. See also |
| radiation | mouse | Mice irradiated with ^{137}Cs γ-rays show a 50-75% decrease in endogenous levels of pGSN. Bleeding is a common consequence of heavy radiation exposure. Administration of rhu-pGSN improved clotting indices in later, but not middle, phases of recovery. Rhu-pGSN improved GSH and MDA oxidative stress indices. |
| pain and inflammation | mouse | Intraperitoneal injection of acetic acid causes a pain response quantified by writhing. Both rhu-pGSN and diclofenac sodium (DS), a standard analgesic drug, caused ~55% reduction in writhing. Similarly, tails placed in hot water caused mice to retract them in an average time of 2.3 s. DS increased time to withdrawal from 5.1 to 7.6 s depending on time of drug administration; rhu-pGSN increased time from 2.9 to 5.5 s. Both DS and rhu-pGSN showed significant reductions in swelling associated with paw injection of an inflammatory agent, γ-carrageenan, as well as decreases in measured cytokines TNF-α and IL-6. |
| diabetes | mouse | Endogenous levels of pGSN decrease by ~50% with type 2 diabetes(T2D) in both humans and mice. In an oral glucose tolerance test, rhu-pGSN brought blood sugar levels down to levels comparable to sitagliptin, a T2D drug. Daily dose of rhu-pGSN kept blood sugar levels close to normal for the 7 days of treatment. Daily dose of sitagliptin increased levels of endogenous pGSN. |

=== Human Studies ===
In 2019 BioAegis Therapeutics conducted a Phase Ib/IIa safety study administering recombinant human pGSN to sick patients with community acquired pneumonia; no safety issues were found. A 2020 Phase IIb placebo-controlled efficacy study has been approved for acute severe pneumonia due to COVID-19. The primary outcome was the proportion of patients surviving on Day 14 without mechanical ventilation, vasopressors, or dialysis. Evaluation of efficacy of rhu-pGSN was confounded by high survival rates of both treatment and placebo cohorts resulting from improvements made to the standard of care for COVID pneumonia. A 600 patient 2024 Phase II placebo-controlled ARDS efficacy study is underway. The study is a collaboration between BioAegis Therapeutics and BARDA.

== See also ==
Cytoplasmic gelsolin

Actin

Vitamin D-binding protein
