= John Stossel =

American journalist (born 1947)

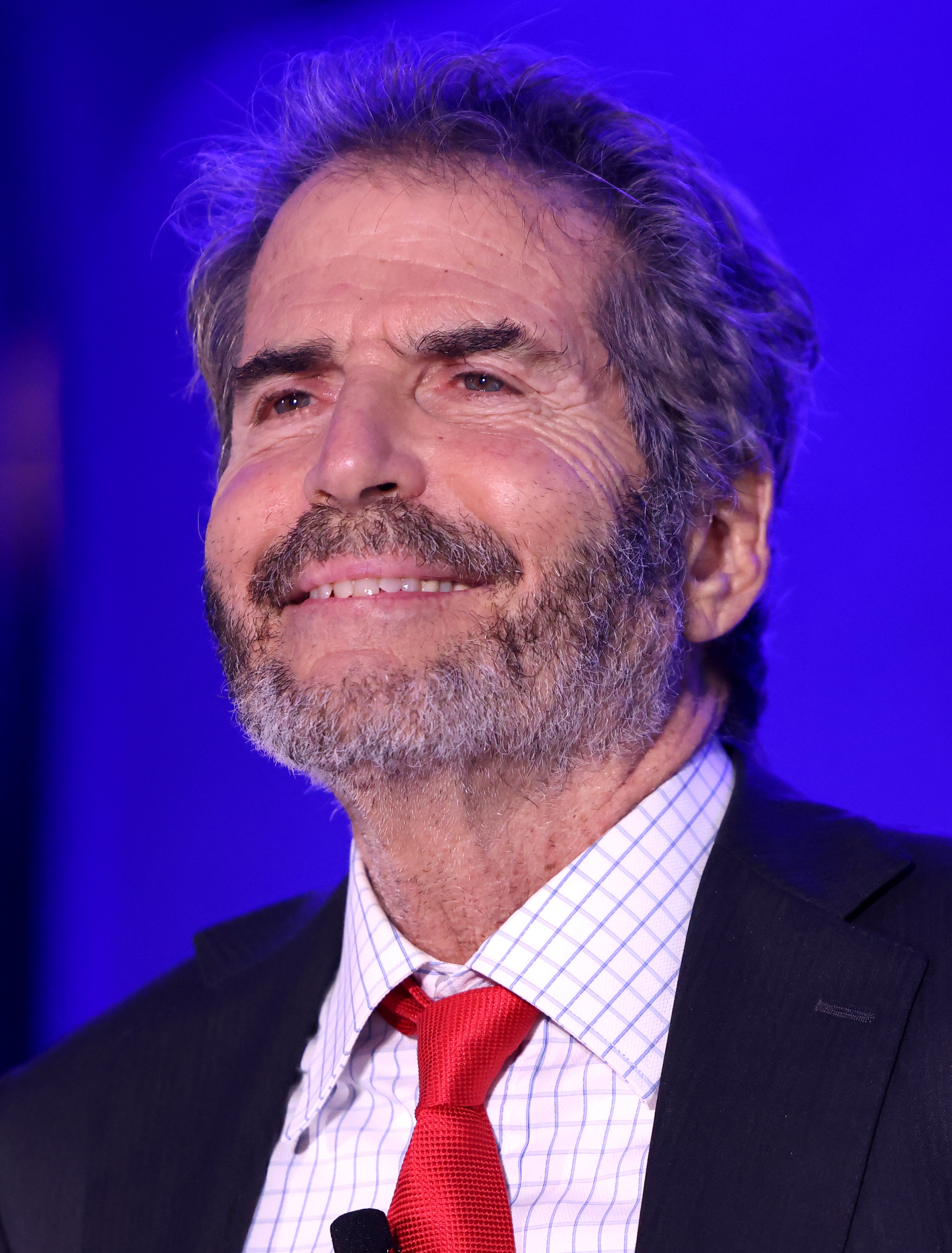
- Stossel in 2025
- Born: John Frank Stossel; March 6, 1947 (age 79); Chicago Heights, Illinois, U.S.
- Education: Princeton University (BA)
- Occupations: Reporter; author; columnist; TV presenter; Libertarian pundit
- Years active: 1969–present
- Notable credits: 20/20; Stossel
- Political party: Libertarian
- Spouse: Ellen Abrams
- Children: 2
- Relatives: Thomas P. Stossel (brother); Scott Hanford Stossel (nephew)
- John Stossel's voice Stossel on how he became a Libertarian; Recorded September 13, 2019
- Website: Official website

John Frank Stossel (born March 6, 1947) is an American libertarian television presenter, author, consumer journalist, political activist, and pundit. He is known for his career as a host on ABC News, Fox Business Network, and Reason TV.

Stossel's style combines reporting and commentary. It reflects a "small L" libertarian political philosophy and views on economics which are largely supportive of the free market. He began his journalism career as a researcher for KGW-TV, was a consumer reporter at WCBS-TV in New York City, and then joined ABC News as a consumer editor and reporter on Good Morning America. Stossel became an ABC News correspondent, joining the weekly news magazine program 20/20, and later became a co-anchor. In October 2009, Stossel left ABC News to join the Fox Business Network. He hosted a weekly news show on Fox Business, Stossel, from December 2009 to December 2016. Stossel founded Stossel in the Classroom, an economic education website for students and in 2019, Stossel launched StosselTV, an online channel distributed on social media.

Stossel has received 19 Emmy Awards and five awards from the National Press Club. He has written three books: Give Me a Break (2004), Myths, Lies, and Downright Stupidity (2007), and No, They Can't: Why Government Fails – But Individuals Succeed (2012).

== Early life ==
John F. Stossel was born on March 6, 1947, in Chicago Heights, Illinois, the younger of two sons, to Jewish parents who left Germany before Hitler rose to power. The family joined a Congregationalist church in the U.S., and Stossel was raised Protestant. He grew up on Chicago's affluent North Shore and graduated from New Trier High School.

Stossel characterizes his older brother, Thomas P. Stossel, as "the superstar of the family", commenting, "While I partied and played poker, he studied hard, got top grades, and went to Harvard Medical School." Stossel characterizes himself as having been "an indifferent student" while in college, commenting, "I daydreamed through half my classes at Princeton, and applied to grad school only because I was ambitious, and grad school seemed like the right path for a 21-year-old who wanted to get ahead." Although he had been accepted to the University of Chicago's School of Hospital Management, Stossel was "sick of school" and thought taking a job would inspire him to embrace graduate studies with renewed vigor. Stossel recalled in an interview that after graduating college, "like a lot of young people I thought capitalism was okay; it brings us some stuff but it's cruel and unfair."

== Career ==
=== Early career ===
In school, Stossel aspired to work at Seattle Magazine, but it went out of business by the time he graduated. His contacts there assisted him in getting a job at KGW-TV in Portland, Oregon, where Stossel began as a newsroom gofer, working his way up to researcher and then writer. After a few years, the news director told Stossel to go on the air and read what he wrote. Despite his stage fright, Stossel says his fear spurred him to improve, examining and imitating broadcasts of David Brinkley and Jack Perkins. Stossel had also stuttered since childhood. After a few years of on-air reporting, he was hired by WCBS-TV in New York City, by Ed Joyce, the same news director who hired Arnold Diaz, Linda Ellerbee, Dave Marash, Joel Siegel and Lynn Sherr. Stossel was disappointed at CBS, feeling that the more limited amount of time spent there on research lowered the quality of its journalism compared to Portland. He cites union work rules that discouraged the extra work that Stossel felt allowed employees to be creative, which he says represented his "first real introduction to the deals made by special interests". Stossel also "hated" Joyce, who he felt was "cold and critical", though he credits Joyce with allowing him the freedom to pursue his own story ideas, and with recommending the Hollins Communications Research Institute in Roanoke, Virginia, that helped Stossel manage his stutter.

Stossel grew continuously more frustrated with having to follow the assignment editor's vision of what was considered news. Perhaps because of his stuttering, he had avoided covering what others covered, feeling he could not compete with other reporters by shouting out questions at news conferences. However, this led to the unexpected realization for Stossel that more important events were those that occurred slowly, such as the women's movement, the growth of computer technology, and advancements in contraception, rather than daily events. One day, Stossel bypassed the assignment editor to give Ed Joyce a list of story ideas the assignment editor had rejected. Joyce agreed that Stossel's ideas were better, and approved them. Stossel has served as a spokesman for the Stuttering Foundation of America.

On December 28, 1984, during an interview for 20/20 on professional wrestling, wrestler David Schultz struck Stossel twice after Stossel said professional wrestling was "fake", during a time when the professional wrestling industry heavily protected kayfabe. Stossel said he suffered from pain and buzzing in his ears eight weeks after the assault. Stossel sued and obtained a settlement of $425,000 from the World Wrestling Federation (WWF); the WWF would eventually admit to the industry having predetermined results in 1989. In his book, Myths, Lies, and Downright Stupidity, Stossel noted his regret, believing lawsuits harm innocent people. Schultz maintains that he attacked Stossel on orders from Vince McMahon, the head of the then-WWF.

=== 20/20 ===
In 1981 Roone Arledge offered Stossel a job at ABC News, as a correspondent for 20/20 and consumer reporter for Good Morning America. His "Give Me a Break" segments for the former featured a contrarian look at subjects from government regulations and pop culture to censorship and unfounded fear. The series was spun off into a series of one-hour specials with budgets of half a million dollars that began in 1994. During the course of his work on 20/20, Stossel wrote, he discovered Reason magazine, whose libertarian ideas appealed to him. Stossel later said in an interview that the regulations he urged governments to pass did not work. After coming out as a libertarian, Stossel said, he angered members of the political left, his news colleagues and others. Stossel was named co-anchor of 20/20 in May 2003, while he was writing his first book, Give Me a Break: How I Exposed Hucksters, Cheats, and Scam Artists and Became the Scourge of the Liberal Media, which was published in 2004. In it, he details his start in journalism and consumer reporting, and how he evolved to harbor libertarian beliefs. Stossel's Myths and Lies series of 20/20 specials challenged a range of liberal beliefs. He hosted The Power of Belief (October 6, 1998), an ABC News Special that focused on assertions of the paranormal and people's desire to believe.

University of Texas economist James K. Galbraith has alleged that Stossel, in his September 1999 special Is America #1?, used an out-of-context clip of Galbraith to twist his words. Stossel denied any misrepresentation of Galbraith's views and stated that it was not his intention to convey that Galbraith agreed with all of the special's ideas. However, he re-edited that portion of the program for its September 2000 repeat.

In a March 2007 segment about finances and lifestyles of televangelists, 20/20 aired a segment by Stossel that included a clip of television minister Frederick K. C. Price, which had originally been broadcast by the Lifetime Network in 1997. Price alleged that the clip portrayed him describing his wealth in extravagant terms, when he was actually telling a parable about a rich man. ABC News twice aired a retraction and apologized for the error. The suit concluded with an out of court settlement including a public apology by ABC.

=== Fox News Channel and Fox Business Network ===
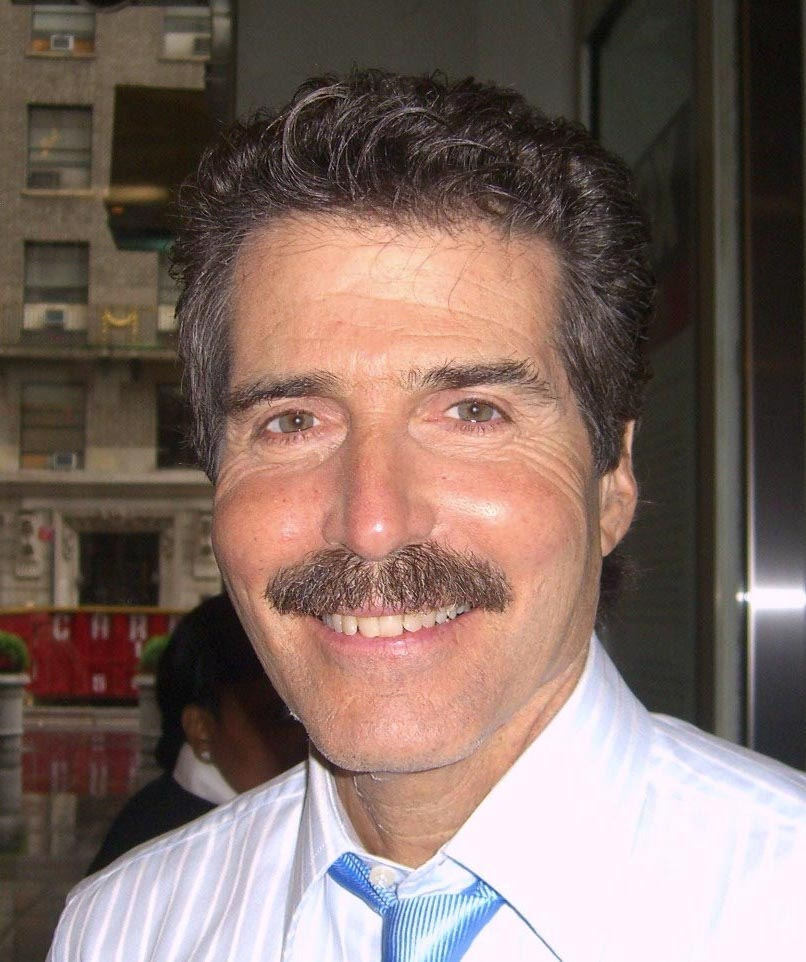
Stossel in 2010

In September 2009, it was announced that Stossel was leaving Disney's ABC News and joining News Corp.'s Fox News Channel and Fox Business Network. In addition to appearing on The O'Reilly Factor every Tuesday night, he also hosted a one-hour weekly program for Fox Business Network and a series of one-hour specials for Fox News Channel, as well as making regular guest appearances on Fox News programs.

The program, Stossel, debuted December 10, 2009, on Fox Business Network. The program examined issues related to individual freedom, free market capitalism and small government, such as civil liberties, the business of healthcare, and free trade. The final episode premiered on December 16, 2016. At the end of that episode, a retrospective that spotlighted moments from seven years of the program, Stossel explained that due to his age, he wanted to help develop a younger generation of journalists with his views, and would continue to appear as a guest on Fox programs, and also help produce content for Reason TV. His blog, "Stossel's Take", was published on both FoxBusiness.com and FoxNews.com.

=== Stossel TV ===
In 2017, Stossel launched Stossel TV, an online channel which distributes weekly videos via social media platforms.

In September 2021, Stossel sued Facebook, alleging defamation for labels applied by fact checkers to two of his videos The suit also named the fact-checking organizations Science Feedback and Climate Feedback as defendants. Facebook attorneys said in 2021, "The labels themselves are neither false nor defamatory; to the contrary, they constitute protected opinion." In October 2022, a federal court dismissed Stossel's lawsuit, saying that Facebook did not defame him because the Facebook fact check program "reflects a subjective judgment about the accuracy and reliability of assertions." The court also ruled that Stossel's lawsuit could be dismissed under California's anti-SLAPP statute.

=== Publications ===
Stossel has written three books. Give Me a Break: How I Exposed Hucksters, Cheats, and Scam Artists and Became the Scourge of the Liberal Media is a 2005 autobiography from Harper Perennial documenting his career and philosophical transition from liberalism to libertarianism. It describes his opposition to government regulation, his belief in free market and private enterprise, support for tort reform, and advocacy for shifting social services from the government to private charities. It was a New York Times bestseller for 11 weeks. Myths, Lies, and Downright Stupidity: Get Out the Shovel – Why Everything You Know Is Wrong, which was published in 2007 by Hyperion, questions the validity of various conventional wisdoms, and argues that the belief he is conservative is untrue. On April 10, 2012, Threshold Editions, an imprint of Simon & Schuster, published Stossel's third book No, They Can't: Why Government Fails – But Individuals Succeed. It argues that government policies meant to solve problems instead produce new ones, and that free individuals and the private sector perform tasks more efficiently than the government does.

With financial support from the libertarian Palmer R. Chitester Fund, Stossel and ABC News launched a series of educational materials for public schools in 1999 entitled "Stossel in the Classroom". It was taken over in 2006 by the Center for Independent Thought and releases a new DVD of teaching materials annually. In 2006, Stossel and ABC released Teaching Tools for Economics, a video series based on the National Council of Economics Education standards.

Stossel writes a weekly newspaper column for Creators Syndicate. His articles appear in such online publications as Newsmax, Reason, and Townhall.

=== Other activities ===
Stossel was a listed faculty member of the Media and Journalism Fellowship of the Charles Koch Institute.

On April 1, 2016, Stossel moderated the first-ever nationally televised Libertarian presidential debate. The second part of the debate aired on April 8. On May 21, 2020, he moderated the Libertarian Party National Convention Presidential Debate between Jacob Hornberger, Vermin Supreme, Jo Jorgensen, Jim Gray, and John Monds.

In June 2024, Stossel moderated an event held by Robert F. Kennedy Jr.'s presidential campaign known as "The Real Debate", where he posed the questions asked during the CNN-hosted presidential debate between Joe Biden and Donald Trump to Kennedy Jr. (who did not meet the eligibility requirements to participate in the debate).

== Views ==
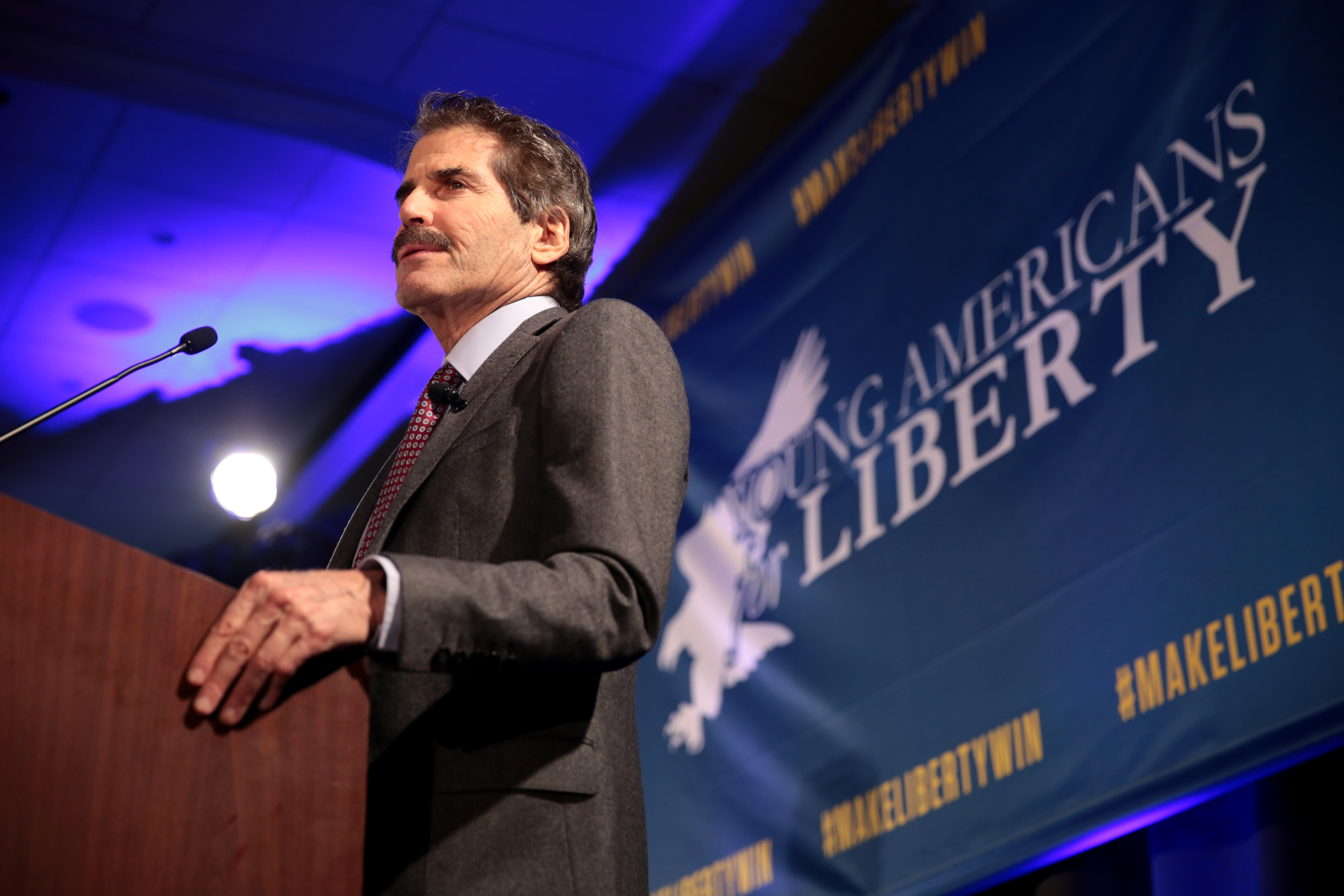
Stossel speaking at the New York City Spring Summit of Young Americans for Liberty

As a libertarian who has said that he usually votes for the Libertarian Party, Stossel says that he believes in both personal freedom and the free market. He frequently uses television airtime to advance these views and challenge viewers' distrust of free-market capitalism and economic competition.

Stossel argues that individual self-interest creates an incentive to work harder and to innovate. He argues that this innovation makes the poor richer and the only way people "can get rich is to offer us something that we believe is better than we had before". He promoted school choice as a way to improve American public schools akin to the Belgian voucher system.

Stossel has criticized government programs for being inefficient, wasteful, and harmful. He has also criticized the American legal system, opining that it provides lawyers and vexatious litigators the incentive to file frivolous lawsuits indiscriminately. Although Stossel concedes that some lawsuits are necessary in order to provide justice to people genuinely injured by others with greater economic power, he advocates the adoption in the U.S. of the English rule as one method to reduce the more abusive or frivolous lawsuits.

Stossel opposes the minimum wage. He believes that minimum wage laws make it unaffordable for employers to employ teenagers who are new to the workforce. Stossel opposes corporate welfare and welfare more broadly, bailouts, seat belt laws, occupational licensing and the war in Iraq. He opposes legal prohibitions against pornography, marijuana, recreational drugs, gambling, ticket scalping, prostitution, polygamy, and assisted suicide, and believes most abortions should be legal. He has said he supports the rule of law, gun rights, pollution control, and lower and simpler taxes. He has endorsed or explored various ideas in his specials and on his TV series for changing the tax system, including switching to a flat tax, and replacing the income tax with the FairTax.

Stossel argues that a country needs to have police and a national defense as laid out by the United States Constitution. Stossel acknowledges that Scandinavian countries have large welfare states, but says that they can only afford them "because they have a homogeneous culture and they have a fairly free private market to pay for it" while also commenting that they have no government-mandated minimum wage.

When the Department of Labor reissued federal guidelines in April 2010 governing the employment of unpaid interns under the Fair Labor Standards Act based on a 1947 Supreme Court decision, Stossel criticized the guidelines, appearing in a police uniform during an appearance on the Fox News program America Live, commenting, "I've built my career on unpaid interns, and the interns told me it was great – I learned more from you than I did in college." Asked why he did not pay them if they were so valuable, he said he could not afford to.

Stossel has falsely claimed that opposition to DDT has resulted in the deaths of millions of children. He has advocated for abolishing the Food and Drug Administration.

In December 2014, Stossel stated that "There is no good data showing secondhand smoke kills people." The fact-checker website Politifact rated this statement "False", saying, "Stossel’s definition of 'good' might be different than ours, but there is plenty of scientific research and consensus that secondhand smoke does indeed kill people." In 2022, Stossel said that he used to donate to Wikipedia, but stopped after learning about its supposed left-wing bias.

== Awards and praise ==
As of 2001, Stossel had won 19 Emmy Awards. He was honored five times for excellence in consumer reporting by the National Press Club, has received a George Polk Award for Outstanding Local Reporting and a Peabody Award. On April 23, 2012, Stossel was awarded the Chapman University Presidential Medal, by the current president, James Doti, and chancellor, Danielle Struppa. The award has been presented to only a handful of people over the past 150 years. Stossel received an honorary doctorate from Universidad Francisco Marroquín.

In promotional copy for one of Stossel's books, the Nobel Prize–winning Chicago School monetarist economist Milton Friedman wrote: "Stossel is that rare creature, a TV commentator who understands economics, in all its subtlety." Steve Forbes, the editor of Forbes magazine, described Stossel as "one of America's ablest and most courageous journalists." The author P. J. O'Rourke said, "He seeks the truths that destroy truisms, wields reason against all that's unreasonable, and uses and upholds the ideals that puncture sanctimonious idealism."

An article published by the libertarian group Advocates for Self Government notes praise for Stossel. Independent Institute Research Analyst Anthony Gregory, writing on the libertarian blog LewRockwell.com, described Stossel as a "heroic rogue... a media maverick and proponent of freedom in an otherwise statist, conformist mass media." Libertarian investment analyst Mark Skousen said Stossel is "a true libertarian hero".

== Personal life ==
Stossel lives in New York City with his wife, Ellen Abrams. They have two children. As of 2014, they also owned a home in Massachusetts.

Stossel came to embrace his family's Ashkenazi Jewish heritage after marrying his wife, who is also Jewish. They also raised their children Jewish. Stossel identified himself as an agnostic in "Skeptic or Believer", the December 16, 2010, episode of Stossel, explaining that he had no belief in God but was open to the possibility.

Stossel's brother, Thomas P. Stossel, was a hematologist, inventor, medical researcher, writer, and Harvard Medical School professor Stossel's nephew is journalist and magazine editor Scott Stossel.

In 2016, Stossel announced that despite being a non-smoker, he had lung cancer and would undergo surgery. He credited his quick recovery to early detection.

== Books ==
- Give Me a Break: How I Exposed Hucksters, Cheats, and Scam Artists and Became the Scourge of the Liberal Media... (Paperback ed.). Harper Paperbacks. 2005. ISBN 978-0-06-052915-4.
- Myths, Lies and Downright Stupidity: Get Out the Shovel – Why Everything You Know is Wrong (Paperback ed.). Hyperion. 2007. ISBN 978-0-7868-9393-5.
- No, They Can't: Why Government Fails – But Individuals Succeed. Threshold Editions. 2012. ISBN 978-1451640946.

== See also ==
- List of newspaper columnists
