= Thomas P. Stossel =

American physician-researcher (1941–2019)

Thomas Peter Stossel
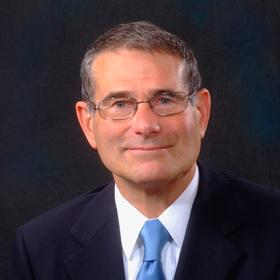
- Born: Thomas Peter Stossel; September 10, 1941; Chicago Heights, Illinois, U.S.
- Died: September 29, 2019 (aged 78); Wellfleet, Massachusetts, U.S.
- Education: Princeton University (BA); Harvard University (MD)
- Known for: Research on cell movements and on innate immunity
- Spouse(s): Anne Hanford (1965–1997; divorced); Kerry Maguire (1997–2019; his death)
- Relatives: Scott Stossel (son); John Stossel (brother)
- Awards: National Academy of Sciences (1997)

Thomas P. Stossel (September 10, 1941 – September 29, 2019) was an American hematologist, inventor, medical researcher, and writer, who discovered gelsolin and invented the BioAegis technology estate. He was also a professor emeritus of medicine at Harvard Medical School and a professor emeritus of clinical research at the American Cancer Society. He was Chief Scientific Advisor to BioAegis Therapeutics Inc., a clinical-stage biotech company developing a non-immunosuppressive anti-inflammatory with the potential to address a wide range of infectious, inflammatory, and degenerative diseases.

== Education and career ==
Stossel majored in English at Princeton University, graduating in 1963. He went on to Harvard Medical School. He completed his internship and residency in internal medicine at the Massachusetts General Hospital in Boston and was a staff associate at the National Heart Institute, after which he received training in hematology at Boston Children's and Peter Bent Brigham Hospitals. He was chief of hematology-oncology at the Massachusetts General Hospital (1976–1991), head of experimental medicine at Brigham and Women's Hospital (1991–1998), and co-director of hematology (1998–2006) and translational medicine (2011–2014) at that institution. He served on the scientific advisory boards of Biogen, Inc. (1997–2002), Dyax, Inc. (1991–2001), and has been a director of Velico Medical Inc. since 2000. He was president of the American Society for Clinical Investigation and of the American Society of Hematology, served on the Lasker Awards' jury, and served as editor-in-chief of The Journal of Clinical Investigation and of Current Opinion in Hematology. Until his death, he was a member of the scientific advisory board of the Forsyth Dental Institute and a trustee of the American Council on Science and Health.

== Scientific contributions ==
Stossel's research included studies of white blood cell structure and function in health and disease but predominantly focused on the molecular mechanism of how cells move and change shape. This research led to the discovery of two important cellular proteins, filamin and plasma gelsolin, that regulate the assembly of actin. Gelsolin is also an abundant extracellular protein that circulates in blood plasma, and Stossel established that it is a component of innate immunity that promotes host antimicrobial activity and prevents the potentially lethal dissemination of inflammation. His company, BioAegis Therapeutics, is conducting clinical trials to assess the potential of plasma gelsolin therapy in a wide variety of infectious, inflammatory, and degenerative diseases.

== BioAegis Therapeutics ==
Stossel was co-founder and chief scientific advisor to BioAegis, a clinical stage company focused on developing therapies for infectious, inflammatory, and degenerative diseases through plasma gelsolin technology and therapeutics. The company commercialized scientific discoveries that harnessed the body's innate defense system by exploiting the multifunctional role of plasma gelsolin ("pGSN"), a highly conserved, endogenous human protein. pGSN is a master regulator—a key immune modulator that balances the inflammatory process to prevent the spread of excess inflammation while simultaneously enhancing antimicrobial defense. In August 2019, BioAegis completed a Phase 1b/2a community-acquired pneumonia clinical trial. In 2023, BioAegis received a $20 million contract from Biomedical Advanced Research and Development Authority's (BARDA) Division of Research, Innovation, and Ventures (DRIVe) to advance gelsolin for the treatment of Acute Respiratory Distress Syndrome (ARDS).

== Publications ==
Stossel was the author of almost 300 publications, including co-authoring two textbooks, Haematology: A Pathophysiological Approach (1984) and Blood: Principles and Practice of Hematology (1997), and the consumer book Pharmaphobia: How the Conflict of Interest Myth Undermines American Medical Innovation (2015). [2]

== Policy work ==
Stossel wrote extensively on policy issues related to medical research and on the relationships between academic researchers, physicians, and the medical products industry. His articles and op-eds appeared in publications including the Wall Street Journal, the Washington Post, and the Boston Globe. His book, Pharmaphobia: How the Conflict of Interest Myth Undermines American Medical Innovation, was published by Rowman and Littlefield in 2015. He was a senior fellow of the Manhattan Institute (2008–2009) and a visiting scholar of the American Enterprise Institute (2014–2017). In 1987, Stossel joined the scientific advisory board of Biogen. He was critical of the Affordable Care Act rule known as the Physician Payments Sunshine Act, which requires all companies that sell medical products to the government to disclose on a public website anything they give to physicians that is valued above $10.

== Awards ==
- Kennedy and Class of 1868 Prizes (Princeton University) 1963
- Resnick Award (Harvard Medical School) 1967
- Dameshek Award (American Society of Hematology 1983
- American Cancer Society Research Professorship 1987
- Honorary MD (Linkökping University, Sweden) 1989
- E Donnall Thomas Prize (American Society of Hematology) 1993
- Elected, American Academy of Arts and Sciences (1996)
- Elected, National Academy of Sciences (1997)
- Elected, National Academy of Medicine (1998)
- Lewis M Sherwood Award (Academy of Pharmaceutical Physicians) 2009
- McGovern Medal (American Medical Writers Association) 2010
- Humanitarian Award (Brigham & Women's Hospital) 2012

== Charity work ==
Stossel was a co-founder of Options for Children in Zambia, which provides dental and medical preventive care and other services to the country's major teaching hospital, an orphanage, and remote rural villages. He also established Lusaka Zambia, a sickle cell disease clinical and research center, in collaboration with physicians at the University Teaching Hospital, University of Zambia, Lusaka, Zambia.

== Personal life ==
Stossel had three children: Scott Stossel, national editor of The Atlantic; Sage Stossel, cartoonist and author of On the Loose in Boston, Washington, DC, Philadelphia, and New York; and Tamara Sakala-Stossel, a graduate student at Northeastern University. With his wife, Kerry Maguire, DDS, MSPH (a public health dentist who is vice president for clinical operations of the Forsyth Dental Institute, Cambridge, Massachusetts), and others, Stossel co-founded a 501(c)(3) charity, Options for Children in Zambia, that provides voluntary dental and medical care in the country. Stossel's younger brother, John Stossel, is an ex-television personality who shared libertarian ideas on Fox News and other major news channels. He now runs his own Youtube channel.
