= Scott Stossel =

American journalist and editor (born 1969)

Scott Hanford Stossel
- Born: Scott Hanford Stossel; August 7, 1969 (age 57); United States
- Citizenship: United States
- Education: Harvard University
- Occupation: Journalist
- Parent(s): Thomas P. Stossel; Anne Hanford
- Relatives: John Stossel (uncle)
- Writing career
- Language: English
- Genres: Journalism
- Notable awards: Erikson Institute Prize for Excellence in Mental Health Media

Scott Hanford Stossel (born August 7, 1969) is an American journalist and editor.

He is the national editor of The Atlantic magazine, and previously served as executive editor of The American Prospect magazine.

== Life ==
Stossel is the son of Anne Hanford and Thomas P. Stossel, the brother of cartoonist Sage Stossel, and the nephew of TV journalist John Stossel.

He is a graduate of Harvard University.

In 2014, Stossel was awarded the Erikson Institute Prize for Excellence in Mental Health Media. He wrote two books including a New York Times bestseller, My Age of Anxiety.

He has advocated for approaches to help anxiety.

== Bibliography ==
- Stossel wrote and published an article My Anxious, Twitchy, Phobic (Somehow Successful) Life in the Atlantic magazine (January/February 2014) which describes his lifelong struggles with debilitating anxiety. This article was adapted from his new book,
- My Age of Anxiety: Fear, Hope, Dread, and the Search for Peace of Mind January, 2014, Knopf (ISBN 978-0-307-26987-4).
- Sarge: The Life and Times of Sargent Shriver, (ISBN 978-1588341273)
