= Yelm, Washington =

- City
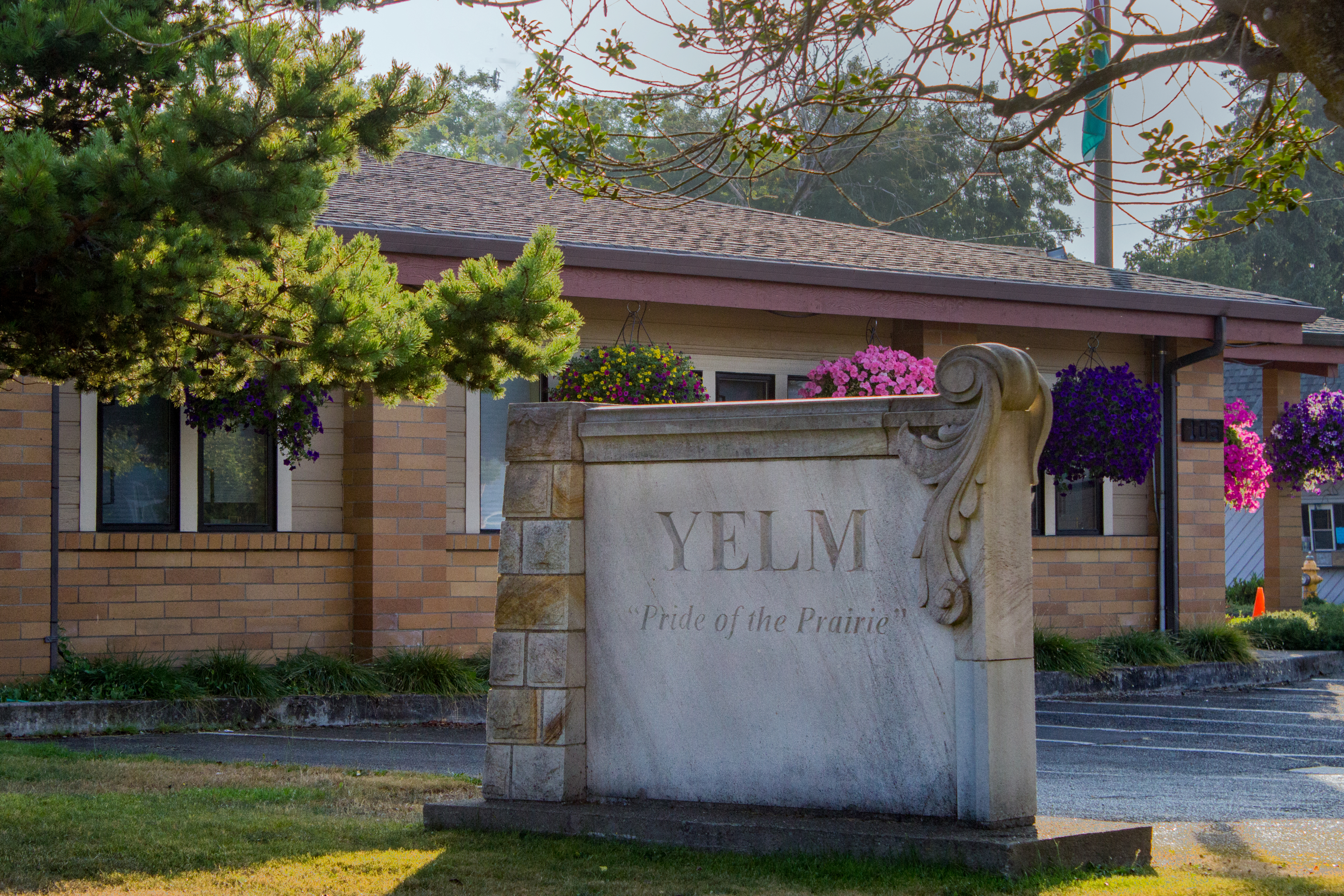
- Yelm City Hall
- Nickname: Pride of the Prairie
- Interactive location map of Yelm
- Coordinates: 46°56′29″N 122°36′23″W
- Country: United States
- State: Washington
- County: Thurston

Government
  - Type: Mayor-Council
  - Mayor: Joe DePinto

Area
  - Total: 5.72 sq mi (14.81 km^{2})
  - Land: 5.71 sq mi (14.79 km^{2})
  - Water: 0.0077 sq mi (0.02 km^{2})
- Elevation: 354 ft (108 m)

Population (2020)
  - Total: 10,617
  - Estimate (2021): 10,707
  - Density: 1,655.6/sq mi (639.23/km^{2})
- Time zone: UTC-8 (PST)
  - Summer (DST): UTC-7 (PDT)
- ZIP Code: 98597
- Area code: 360, 564
- FIPS code: 53-80220
- GNIS feature ID: 1512817
- Website: ci.yelm.wa.us

Yelm (/jɛlm/) is a city in Thurston County, Washington, United States bordering Pierce County along the Nisqually River. Its population was 10,617 at the 2020 census.

== History ==
The word "Yelm" is said to come from the Coast Salish word shelm or chelm, meaning "heat waves from the sun", referring to heat mirages.

The Yelm Prairie was originally inhabited by the Nisqually and provided good pasture for their horses. The first permanent nonindigenous settlers came in 1853 to join the Hudson's Bay Company sheep farmers, who already conducted business in the area.

James Longmire, one of the first American settlers, said upon arriving in Yelm:

Having received due notice from the Hudson Bay company not to settle on any lands north of the Nisqually River, we crossed the river and went to Yelm prairie, a beautiful spot. I thought as it lay before us covered with tall, waving grass, a pretty stream bordered with shrubs and tall trees, flowing through it, and the majestic mountain standing guard over all, in its snowy coat, it was a scene fit for an artist. Herds of deer wandered at leisure through the tall grass.

With the coming of the Northern Pacific Railway in 1873, Yelm began to prosper, having found an outlet for its agricultural and forestry products. Its economic base was further enhanced when an irrigation company created the Yelm Ditch in 1916, making Yelm a center for commercial production of beans, cucumbers, and berries.

Yelm was incorporated on December 8, 1924.

During the Great Depression, high maintenance costs and an unstructured water-distribution plan bankrupted the Yelm Irrigation Company.

On December 13, 1989, the Town of Yelm, a fourth-class municipality, was reorganized into a non-charter code city, resulting in the name being changed to the City of Yelm.

At the beginning of the 21st century, Yelm was the 10th-fastest-growing city in the state in population.

On January 27, 2026, the City of Yelm completed the largest annexation of land in the history of the city, comprising approximately 1,280 acres (520 ha) and 800 residents, bringing the total area to 7.724 square miles (20.01 km^{2}) and a population of about 12,000 residents.

== Geography ==
Yelm is located in southeastern Thurston County, adjacent to its border with Pierce County, along the Nisqually River. The city is near the Nisqually Indian Reservation (located to the northwest on State Route 510), and Joint Base Lewis–McChord on the northeast side of the river. Another major highway, State Route 507, connects Yelm to Centralia and Spanaway near Tacoma.

According to the United States Census Bureau, the city has a total area of 5.69 square miles (14.74 km^{2}), of which 0.01 sq mi (0.03 km^{2}) is covered by water.

== Demographics ==
Historical population
Census	Pop.	Note	%±
1930	384		—
1940	378		−1.6%
1950	470		24.3%
1960	479		1.9%
1970	628		31.1%
1980	1,294		106.1%
1990	1,337		3.3%
2000	3,289		146.0%
2010	6,848		108.2%
2020	10,617		55.0%
2021 (est.)	10,707		0.8%
U.S. Decennial Census; 2020 Census

=== 2020 census ===
As of the 2020 census, Yelm had a population of 10,617. The median age was 29.9 years; 32.5% of residents were under 18 and 8.4% were 65 or older. For every 100 females, there were 93.8 males, and for every 100 females 18 and over, there were 86.7 males 18 and over.

About 93.5% of residents lived in urban areas, while 6.5% lived in rural areas.

Of the 3,356 households in Yelm, 51.2% had children under 18 living in them, 57.4% were married-couple households, 11.5% were households with a male householder and no spouse or partner present, and 23.1% were households with a female householder and no spouse or partner present. About 17.3% of all households were made up of individuals, and 7.5% had someone living alone who was 65 or older.

The 3,455 housing units were 2.9% vacant. The homeowner vacancy rate was 1.2% and the rental vacancy rate was 2.8%.

Racial composition as of the 2020 census
Race	Number	Percent
White	7,594	71.5%
Black or African American	360	3.4%
American Indian and Alaska Native	206	1.9%
Asian	387	3.6%
Native Hawaiian and other Pacific Islander	240	2.3%
Some other race	394	3.7%
Two or more races	1,436	13.5%
Hispanic or Latino (of any race)	1,275	12.0%

=== 2010 census ===
As of the 2010 census, 6,848 people, 2,299 households, and 1,712 families resided in the city. The population density was 1,205.6 inhabitants per square mile (465.5/km^{2}). The 2,523 housing units had an average density of 444.2 per square mile (171.5/km^{2}). The racial makeup of the city was 81.6% White, 3.3% African American, 1.8% Native American, 2.3% Asian, 0.9% Pacific Islander, 2.8% from other races, and 7.3% from two or more races. Hispanics or Latinos of any race were 9.4% of the population.

Of the 2,299 households, 53.3% had children under 18 living with them, 51.7% were married couples living together, 17.8% had a female householder with no husband present, 5.0% had a male householder with no wife present, and 25.5% were not families. About 20.3% of all households were made up of individuals, and 8.6% had someone living alone who was 65 or older. The average household size was 2.95, and the average family size was 3.40.

The median age in the city was 29 years; 36% of residents were under 18; 8% were between 18 and 24; 32.3% were from 25 to 44; 16.1% were from 45 to 64; and 7.6% were 65 or older. The gender makeup of the city was 46.9% male and 53.1% female.

=== 2000 census ===
As of the 2000 census, 3,289 people, 1,216 households, and 807 families were residing in the city. The population density was 584.4 people per square mile (225.6/km^{2}). The 1,323 housing units had an average density of 235.1 per square mile (90.7/km^{2}). The racial makeup of the city was 86.2% White, 1.8% African American, 2.2% Native American, 1.7% Asian, 1.2% Pacific Islander, 1.6% from other races, and 5.4% from two or more races.Hispanics or Latinos of any race were 5.35% of the population.

Of the 1,216 households, 41.5% had children under 18 living with them, 48.2% were married couples living together, 14.4% had a female householder with no husband present, and 33.6% were not families. About 27.1% of all households were made up of individuals, and 11.6% had someone living alone who was 65 or older. The average household size was 2.67, and the average family size was 3.26.

In the city, the age distribution was 32.0% under 18, 9.3% from 18 to 24, 31.4% from 25 to 44, 16.6% from 45 to 64, and 10.8% who were 65 or older. The median age was 31 years. For every 100 females, there were 88.5 males. For every 100 females 18 and over, there were 82.7 males.

The median income in the city for a household was $39,453 and for a family was $45,475. Males had a median income of $32,037 versus $24,474 for females. The per capita income for the city was $15,865. About 7.9% of families and 10.1% of the population were below the poverty line, including 11.3% of those under 18 and 6.8% of those 65 or over.

== Economy ==
To a large extent, Yelm acts as a bedroom community for residents working in the surrounding cities of Tacoma, Olympia, and Centralia. It also hosts a large number of military families currently or formerly stationed at nearby Joint Base Lewis-McChord.

Yelm experienced significant expansion in the decades surrounding the turn of the 21st century. On February 14, 2017, in consultation with city residents, the city council adopted the Yelm Comprehensive Plan update, which clarifies plans and policies for the city's physical, economic, and community development through the 2030s, including utilities, public transportation, and parks.

== Parks and recreation ==
Yelm City Park was donated by Chuck and Wilma Demich in 1950. Located at the corner of SR 507 and Mosman Avenue, it is about one city block in size. It has a kitchen, covered facilities, a playground area, picnic tables, public restrooms, and a softball backstop. A number of community events are held there each year, including Prairie Days, Christmas in the Park, Family Fun Day, an annual car show, and the Yelm Lions Easter Egg Hunt.

Yelm was the eastern terminus of the Yelm-Rainier-Tenino Trail that has been extended into Pierce County with the opening of the Nisqually River Pedestrian Bridge.

Yelm has the first class-A water reclamation facility and distribution system in Washington, which reclaims all wastewater for local irrigation and recharge streams. The water is also used in Cochrane Park, an 8-acre (32,000 m^{2}) wetland park that includes a catch-and-release pond for rainbow trout.

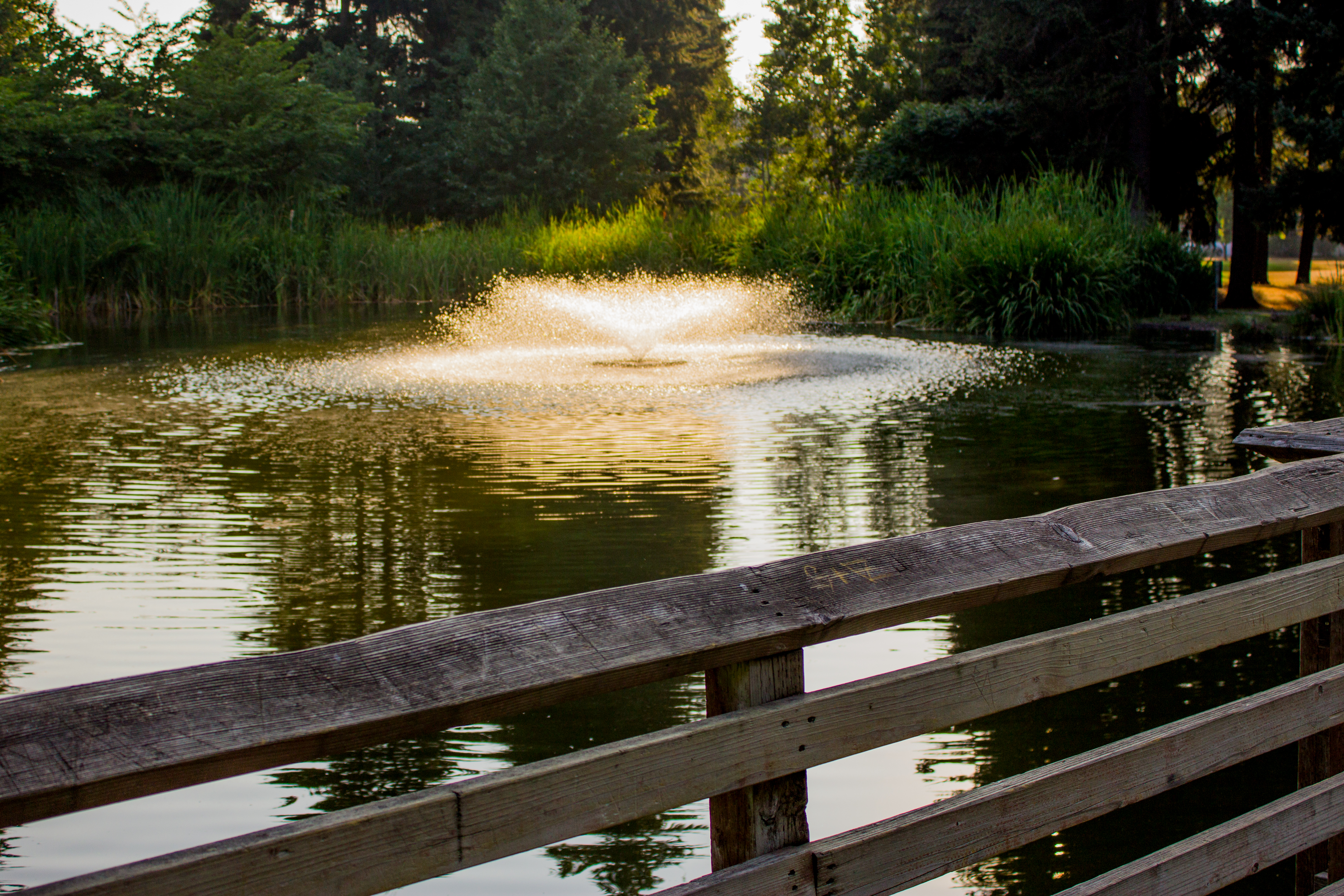
Cochrane Memorial Park, 2018

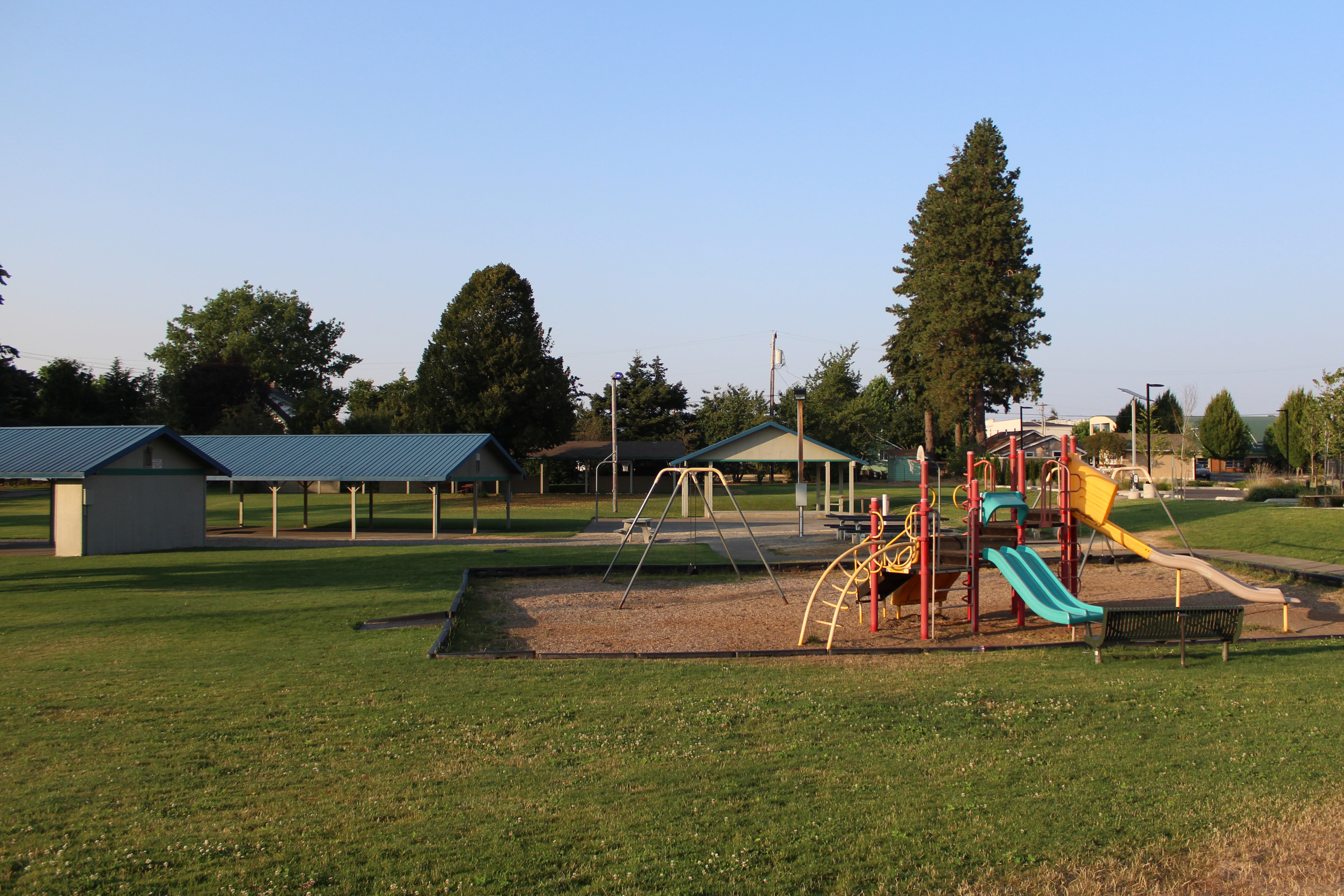
Yelm City Park, 2018

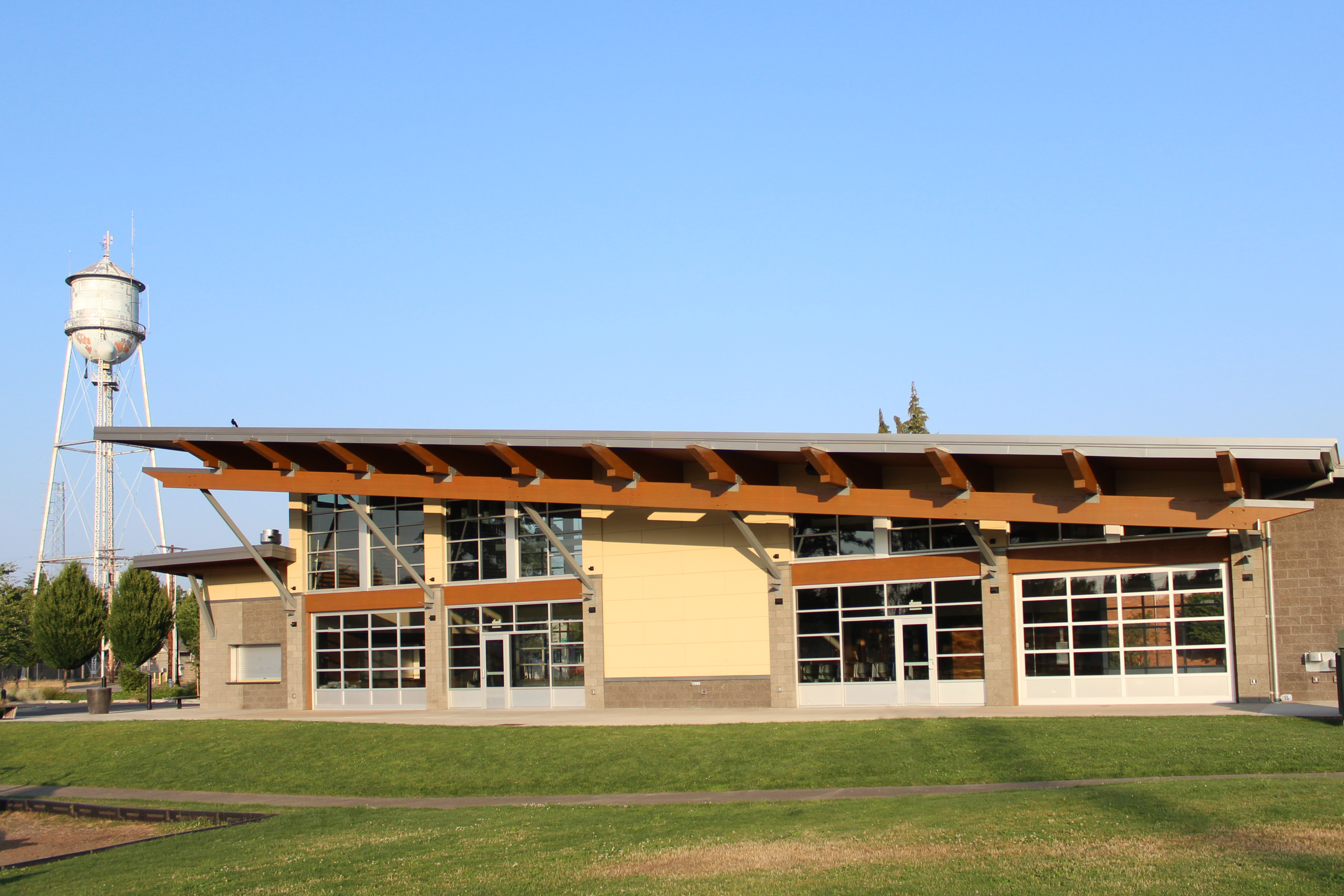
Yelm Community Center, 2018

== Government ==
Yelm has an elected mayor-council government and is a non-charter code city. The city council, the policy-making branch of Yelm's government, consists of seven members elected at-large to staggered, four-year terms. The mayor is elected at-large and serves as the city's chief executive officer. The mayor and council are supported by the city administrator and several advisory boards and commissions. The city administrator, appointed by the mayor and confirmed by the council, serves as the mayor's chief administrative officer. As described in the Yelm Municipal Code and Revised Code of Washington, certain responsibilities are vested in the city council and the mayor.

Yelm offers a full range of municipal services, provided by seven departments. Sales tax, 8.7% per dollar spent, is distributed as follows:

- Washington State: 6.5%
- Thurston County: 1.4%
- Yelm: 0.8%

=== Mayor ===
The mayor of Yelm elected in 2021 is Joe DePinto.

=== City Council ===
The seven-member Yelm City Council represents the needs and interests of Yelm's citizens. The council establishes policy for the city, adopts the annual budget, and represents Yelm's interests on regional boards and commissions.

=== City administration ===
The Yelm post office serves the surrounding unincorporated Thurston County residential communities in Lake Lawrence, Clearwood, and other communities in the Bald Hills area.

Firefighting services for the cities of Yelm, Rainier and surrounding unincorporated areas are provided by the Southeast Thurston Fire Authority.

== Education ==
Public schools in Yelm belong to the Yelm School District. Its elementary schools are Fort Stevens, Lackamas, McKenna, Mill Pond, Southworth, and Yelm Prairie. Its secondary school system includes Yelm Middle School, Ridgeline Middle School, Yelm High School, and Yelm Extension School. The private Eagle View Christian School is also in Yelm.

== Notable people ==
- Fay Fuller, journalist and mountaineer

== See also ==
- North Yelm, Washington
- Ramtha's School of Enlightenment
- Nisqually Valley News
