= Chicken John =

American showman and artist (born 1968)

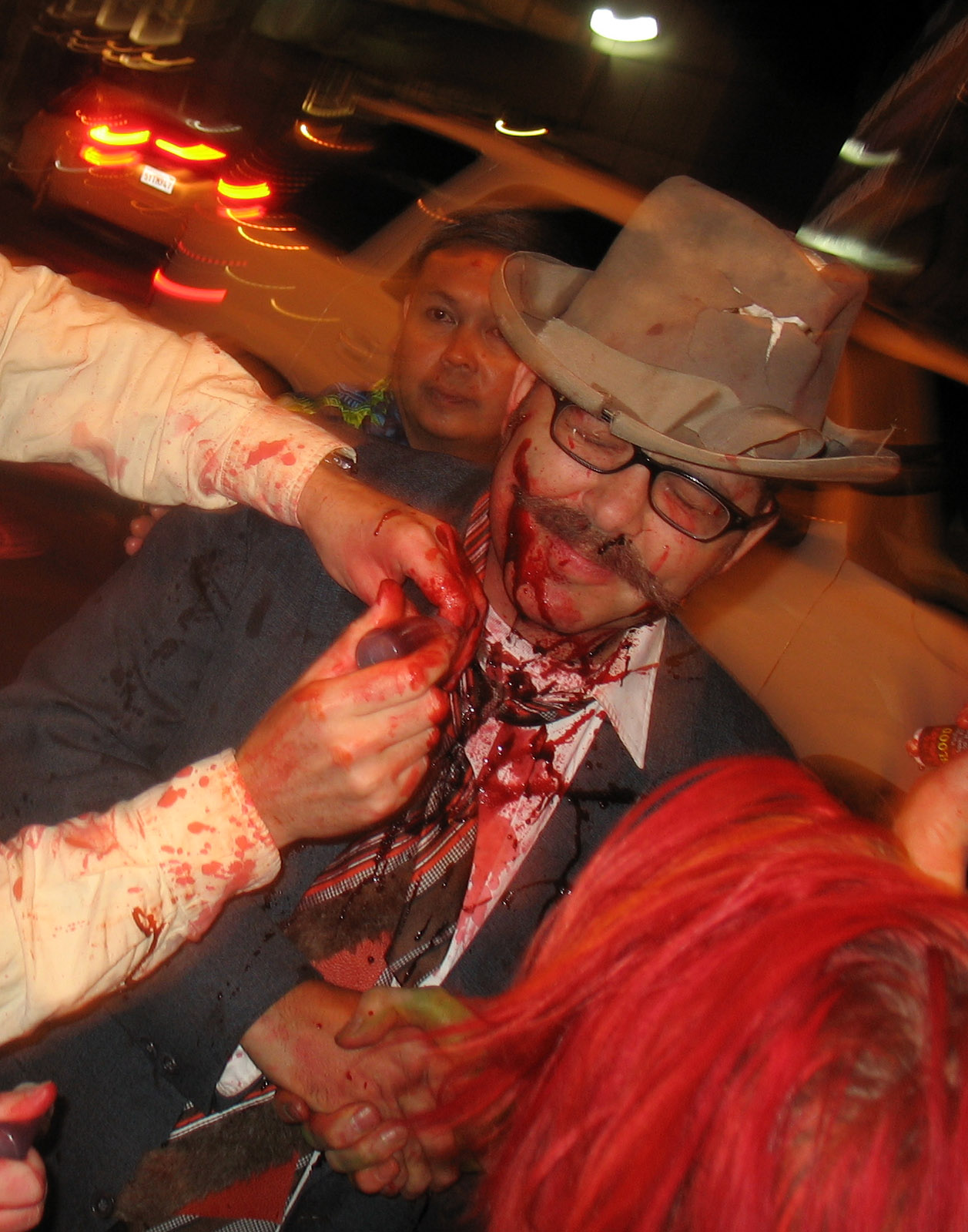
- Chicken John being prepared for a zombie mob after a San Francisco mayoral debate, 2007
- Occupations: Showman, activist
- Years active: 1984–present

"Chicken" John Joseph James Rinaldi (born 1968) is a musician, showman, activist, and author living in San Francisco, California. He is involved with the San Francisco arts community as well as the Burning Man community. In what he referred to as "an experiment", he was a candidate in the 2007 San Francisco mayoral election, during which he wore fake mustaches, debated a puppet, and arranged costumed flash mobs to occur at campaign events, in an effort to be as flippant a candidate as possible.

== Musician ==
After playing with the New York punk rock band Letch Patrol, Rinaldi was briefly the guitarist in The Murder Junkies, fronted by GG Allin; he was replaced by Dee Dee Ramone and William Weber. He expressed negative opinions about the experience in Todd Phillips's documentary Hated: GG Allin And The Murder Junkies.

== Showman ==
In 1994 Rinaldi conceived, organized, and became the ringmaster of Circus Redickuless, a nationally touring "punk rock circus". The circus was the subject of a 1997 documentary of the same name by Phillip Glau, which won Best Documentary at the 1998 New York Underground Film Festival.

=== Boating ===
In the summer of 2006, Rinaldi was recruited by noted street artist Swoon to build the propulsion system for a raft made of salvaged scrap that was to travel down the Mississippi River for Swoon's project Miss Rockaway Armada.

Rinaldi was the engineer and builder for the central communal floating platform for the Seasteading Institute's 2009 Ephemerisle event.

=== San Francisco mayor joke candidacy ===
As an elaborate joke, Rinaldi ran as one of several colorfully-nicknamed candidates in the 2007 San Francisco mayoral election, ostensibly challenging incumbent Gavin Newsom. Rinaldi referred to himself an "experimental candidate". He made an effort to be as flippant a candidate as possible, wearing seven different fake mustaches over the course of the campaign, publicly debating a puppet, and organizing a zombie flash mob to occur outside one of the Mayoral debates. He finished with 2,508 votes, or 1.75 percent of the official vote tally, coming in 6th place.

== Activism ==
=== Campaign financing ===
After submitting the required official declaration of candidacy on August 8, 2007, Rinaldi claimed to have raised $25,000 in campaign donations from San Francisco residents by August 28, thus qualifying him for public matching funds. On September 13 he was denied public financing by the San Francisco Ethics Commission on the basis that around $20,000 was donated through e-commerce site PayPal. As it was PayPal's official policy to keep billing information confidential and provide only a shipping address, the commission ruled such donations were insufficient proof of donor residency as required by law.

Rinaldi's campaign contacted PayPal and obtained special internal verification that the addresses did indeed match, which was submitted September 19. By October 2 the Ethics Commission had approved many more contributions, but those qualified for matching funds still fell several hundred dollars short. The following day the campaign's lawyer submitted a request asking the commission to clarify which donations were ineligible, and for which reason, and a date by which to appeal them. Executive Director John St. Croix responded that by requesting an appeal, the campaign had lost its right to do so. On October 15, a meeting of the full commission unanimously overturned St. Croix's decision. The Ethics Commission invited Rinaldi's campaign to resubmit documents. The application was subsequently denied on review and Rinaldi's campaign did not receive the requested public funds.

=== Renaming a sewage plant after George W. Bush ===
He was part of the Presidential Memorial Commission of San Francisco that placed Proposition R on the November 4, 2008 ballot to name San Francisco's Oceanside Treatment Plant after George W. Bush. The ballot measure failed with only 30% of voters approving the idea.

=== American Apparel ===
In 2009, Rinaldi organized against an American Apparel outlet being permitted to open on Valencia Street in the Mission District. Several years before, the city approved a voter initiative requiring a public hearing for such "formula retail" stores to open in certain commercial corridors. Prior to any approval, American Apparel's website listed the address of their Mission location as early as November 2008. The San Francisco Planning Department unanimously rejected the permit.

== Author ==
Rinaldi self-published The Book of the IS: Fail... To WIN!, Essays in engineered disperfection.

He collaborated with Jason Webley for the hardcover book that accompanied Webley's album Margaret.

== Ritual Coffee controversies ==
In 2020, employees launched an email campaign to raise concerns about diversity and workplace culture at Ritual Coffee, a chain of four coffee shops owned by Rinaldi's wife, Eileen Rinaldi. Among their concerns were two confrontations involving customers of color, including one where Rinaldi called the police on a Black customer in 2019. Rinaldi admitted to using a racial slur during an argument over a parking spot with a Black man outside a Ritual Coffee warehouse in late May 2021. Eileen Rinaldi confirmed in June 2021 that she had terminated her husband's employment.
