= Presidential Memorial Commission of San Francisco =

The logo of the Presidential Memorial Commission of San Francisco, which depicts an eagle clutching two plungers; above the eagle's head appears the motto, E Pluribus Anus.

The Presidential Memorial Commission of San Francisco (Presidential Memorial Commission for short) was a voter group that sponsored a satirical but real 2008 ballot initiative to rename the Oceanside Water Pollution Control Plant, a wastewater treatment plant in San Francisco, California, after outgoing Republican U.S. President George W. Bush. The resulting proposed ordinance, Proposition R, would have taken effect immediately upon the inauguration of Bush's successor if passed. It was, however, voted down decisively in the November 2008 San Francisco general election, with "no" votes outnumbering "yes" votes by a margin of more than two-to-one.

== Background ==
George W. Bush, 43rd President of the United States

The goal of the unofficial commission was to put the following ballot question before San Francisco voters in the 2008 general election:

Should The City And County of San Francisco Rename The Oceanside Water Pollution Control Plant the George W Bush Sewage Plant?

The group was chaired by Brian McConnell, a self-described "inventor, author and entrepreneur" with experience organizing events in San Francisco's LGBT community. McConnell, who adopted the alias T. Wayne Pickering during the campaign and often dressed as Uncle Sam while soliciting signatures, allegedly conceived of the idea while discussing the Bush presidency at a bar. Other early co-sponsors included performing artist and former "experimental" mayoral candidate "Chicken" John Rinaldi.

Going into April 2008, the grassroots movement had a working website and six total members. By month's end, an SFist article about the group had received brief mentions from larger publications including The Washington Post and The Huffington Post, and membership had increased to more than 600. In May, the commission set up a Twitter account that provided followers with advance notice of its canvassing activities, which depended entirely on volunteers and primarily targeted local events and bars.

The San Francisco Department of Elections required a minimum of 7,168 valid voter signatures by July 7 in order for the measure to be included in the November election. On June 24, SFGate reported that the commission had obtained more than 8,500, prompting a New York Times story which appeared the next morning and led WorldNetDaily correspondent Lester Kinsolving to ask White House Press Secretary Dana Perino for an official reaction at a press briefing hours later. A wave of national and even international press coverage followed, with prominent outlets including The Associated Press, the BBC and Die Zeit producing print and broadcast content about the petition both before and after its official approval for the ballot.

On July 7, the day of the ballot initiative submission deadline, the commission launched a WordPress blog, announcing with its first post that they had turned in 11,999 signatures. According to their own figures "every zip code in San Francisco [was] represented," with nearly half of all signatories coming from the Mission, Castro or Haight-Ashbury neighborhoods. Ten days later, the measure was officially qualified for the November election, one of three propositions to earn a spot on the San Francisco ballot through the initiative process that year. It appeared alongside twenty-one other ballot measures, with slightly revised phrasing:

Shall the City change the name of the Oceanside Water Pollution Control Plant to the George W Bush Sewage Plant?

After being assigned the name Proposition R on August 14, the commission produced several "Yes on R" campaign materials, including flyers and a video featuring the slogan "R is for Remember" and original artwork by San Francisco-based visual artist pixelstud. The group also announced plans for an election night press conference featuring drag performer Peaches Christ, whom they identified as a spokesperson.

== Opposition ==
The San Francisco Republican Party announced its intention to campaign against the measure, which its chair described as "loony bin direct democracy." A former spokesman of the California Republican Party called the initiative "childish" and "stupid," saying "it makes me ashamed to be a San Franciscan." Meanwhile, officials with the San Francisco Public Utilities Commission, which operates the Oceanside plant, rejected the notion that association with the award-winning facility would be an insult, citing its environmental record.

The opponent's argument against Proposition R in the official Department of Elections Voter Information Pamphlet made no attempt to defend Bush's record, asserting that "Bush has been the most ignorant man to ever occupy the office of President." Instead, it argued that Bush's mistakes were "not a laughing matter" and that the proposed renaming would "disrespect" those affected by them. It further suggested that perhaps, in light of the recent bailout of Fannie Mae and Freddie Mac, "it would be more appropriate to name the local bankruptcy court or a consumer credit counseling center after Bush."

== Result ==
Despite some journalists forecasting a victory as "likely" based on the heavily liberal political tendencies of San Francisco, Proposition R fell well short of the simple majority needed for its passage, with only 30.25% of voters in favor overall and no more than 37% voting yes in any of San Francisco's eleven supervisorial districts.
