= Patri Friedman =

American libertarian theorist (born 1976)

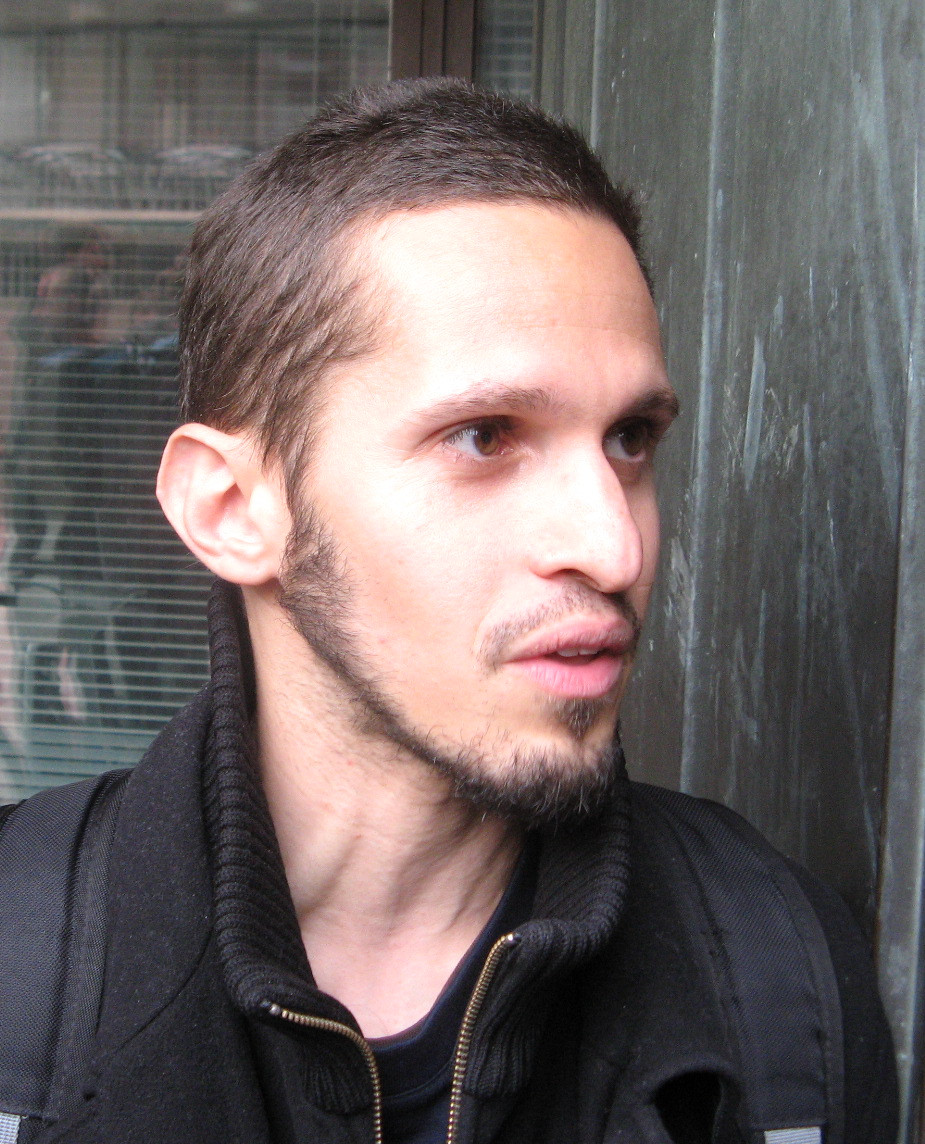
- Friedman in 2011
- Born: July 29, 1976 (age 50); Blacksburg, Virginia, U.S.
- Education: Harvey Mudd College (BA); Stanford University (MS); New York Institute of Technology (MBA)
- Occupations: Activist and political theorist
- Spouse: Brit Benjamin (divorced 2023)
- Children: 3
- Relatives: Milton Friedman (grandfather); Rose Friedman (grandmother); David D. Friedman (father); Elizabeth Cook (mother)
- Website: patrifriedman.com

Patri Friedman (born July 29, 1976) is an American libertarian, anarcho-capitalist, and theorist of political economy. He founded The Seasteading Institute, a non-profit that explores the creation of sovereign ocean colonies.

== Early life and education ==
Named after family friend Patri Pugliese, Friedman grew up in King of Prussia, Pennsylvania, and is a graduate of Upper Merion Area High School, class of 1994, where he went by the name Patri Forwalter-Friedman. He graduated from Harvey Mudd College in 1998, and went on to Stanford University to obtain his master's degree in computer science. He also holds an MBA from New York Institute of Technology. He worked as a software engineer at Google. As a poker player, he cashed in the World Series of Poker four times.

== The Seasteading Institute ==
Friedman was executive director of The Seasteading Institute, founded in 2008, with a half-million-dollar donation from venture capitalist Peter Thiel. The institute's mission is "to establish permanent, autonomous ocean communities to enable experimentation and innovation with diverse social, political, and legal systems". This was initially a part-time project – one day a week while working as a Google engineer the rest of the time – but Friedman left Google on July 29, 2008, to spend more time on seasteading. He and partner Wayne C. Gramlich hoped to float the first prototype seastead in the San Francisco Bay by 2010. At the October 2010 Seasteading social, it was announced that current plans were to launch a seastead by 2014.

Since attending the Burning Man festival in 2000, Friedman imagined creating a water festival called Ephemerisle as a Seasteading experiment and Temporary Autonomous Zone. Through The Seasteading Institute, Friedman was able to start the Ephemerisle festival in 2009, aided by TSI's James Hogan as event organizer and Chicken John Rinaldi as chief builder. The first Ephemerisle is chronicled in a documentary by Jason Sussberg. Since 2010, the event has been annual and community-run.

== Future Cities Development ==
On July 31, 2011, Friedman stepped down from the position as executive director of The Seasteading Institute, but remained chairman of the board. Later, he co-founded the Future Cities Development Corporation, a project to establish a self-governing charter city within the borders of Honduras. In 2012, the Future Cities Development Corporation ceased operations.

== Pronomos Capital ==
In 2019, Friedman founded Pronomos Capital, a venture capital firm whose purpose is to bankroll the construction of experimental cities on vacant tracts of land in developing countries. Like The Seasteading Institute, Pronomos Capital is backed by Peter Thiel. Most of the cities will be aimed at foreign businesses seeking friendlier tax treatment.

== Poker career ==
In 2000, Card Player Magazine suggested Patri Friedman might become a world champion. His winnings were as follows:

Year	World Series of Poker Tournament	Place	Prize
2002	$2,000 No Limit Hold'em	11th	$9,280
2004	$10,000 No Limit Hold'em World Championship	165th	$15,000
2008	$2,500 No Limit Hold'em	24th	$17,351
2008	$10,000 No Limit Hold'em World Championship	640th	$21,230

== Personal life ==
Patri is the grandson of Nobel Prize-winning economist Milton Friedman and economist Rose Friedman and son of economist and physicist David D. Friedman. He has two children by his first wife. As of February 10, 2018, he was married to Brit Benjamin with whom he has one child. They divorced in 2023. Patri and Brit are self-described transhumanists and rationalists, and they have arranged to be cryonically preserved after their death.

As of May 2026, Patri was dating art critic Victoria Campbell.
