= Gerardo Sandoval =

American judge (born 1962)

Gerardo C. Sandoval
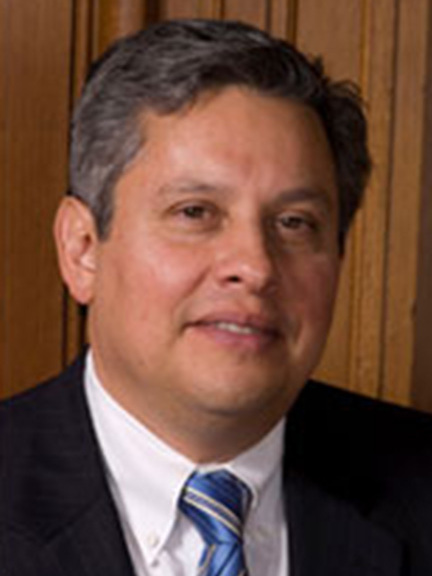
- Official portrait, c. 2001–2009

Judge of the San Francisco Superior Court
- In office January 8, 2009 – February 9, 2026
- Preceded by: Thomas J. Mellon Jr.

Member of the San Francisco Board of Supervisors for the 11th district
- In office January 8, 2001 – January 8, 2009

Personal details
- Born: 1961 or 1962 (age 63–64) Los Angeles, California, U.S.
- Party: Democratic
- Education: University of California, Berkeley; Columbia Law School
- Occupation: Judge, politician
- Profession: Attorney

Gerardo C. Sandoval (born 1961/1962) is a retired American judge who formerly served on the Superior Court of California in and for the County of San Francisco. He was elected to the office in the November 2008 San Francisco general election. Sandoval previously served on the San Francisco Board of Supervisors from 2001 to 2009, representing District 11.

== Early life ==
Sandoval's mother was a garment worker and homemaker. His father was a gardener and union organizer. He was in the first Head Start in 1966 and considers himself a product of Lyndon Johnson's "Great Society".

Sandoval attended Loyola High School in Los Angeles before graduating from the University of California, Berkeley in 1987. In 1989, he received his master's degree in City and Regional Planning from UC Berkeley, with a specialization in real estate and housing development. He wrote his master's thesis on using tax credits to build affordable housing. Sandoval received his Juris Doctor from Columbia University Law School.

== Career ==
Sandoval worked as an assistant to San Francisco Mayor Art Agnos from 1990 to 1992, where he was responsible for budget and finance issues. He worked as a trial attorney and Deputy Public Defender in the San Francisco Public Defender's Office for five years. He was formerly an associate at Skadden, Arps, Slate, Meagher & Flom. Sandoval also completed a three-year term on San Francisco's Public Transportation Commission.

Sandoval ran for San Francisco Assessor-Recorder in 2005. He eventually lost to incumbent Phil Ting, who was appointed by mayor Gavin Newsom earlier that year.

=== San Francisco Board of Supervisors ===
As supervisor, Sandoval passed a consular identification ordinance. The ordinance requires that City employees (including police officers, airport workers, and health care workers) accept as identification the ID cards issued by foreign consulates if the cards have sufficient safeguards against fraudulent duplication and are accepted by the foreign government for entry into their national territory. The cards are used by individuals traveling temporarily in the US such as Mexican truck drivers who are allowed under the North American Free Trade Agreement (NAFTA) to enter the US. The cards also allow individuals to open bank accounts and otherwise access commonly available financial services. The ordinance has been criticized by opponents as allowing undocumented workers to more easily live in the US. Supporters of the ordinance have argued that such legislation by local governments is necessary to fill the vacuum in policy left due to inaction from federal and state governments.

In December 2003, Sandoval (along with Chris Daly, Matt Gonzalez, and Tom Ammiano) signed a measure to put Proposition I (or the Healthy Air Enforcement Act of 2004) onto the March 2004 San Francisco general election. The proposition would have required the San Francisco Municipal Transportation Agency to replace its fleet of pre-1991 diesel buses before 2007. Prop I passed with about 67% of the vote.

In July 2005, Sandoval voted with the 8-3 majority against bringing the retired USS Iowa battleship to San Francisco as a museum. The resolution garnered national attention for San Francisco as being anti-military. In February 2006, Sandoval appeared on an episode of Hannity & Colmes stating "I don't think we should have a military." Sandoval published an op-ed on the San Francisco Chronicle the next week clarifying that he meant to say the US Government should invest more in education rather than in foreign wars.

Sandoval introduced a resolution "condemning the defamatory language used by talk radio host Michael Savage" after Savage criticized undocumented immigrant protesters who were fasting in support of the controversial DREAM Act, which would give qualifying undocumented immigrants a path to US citizenship as well as enable them to receive tax payer funded in-state college tuition. While the original 9-1 vote on August 14, 2007 failed to receive the required unanimous vote, the Board’s second attempt on October 2, 2007 passed after the one dissenting supervisor had been suspended from the Board by the Mayor.

=== San Francisco Superior Court ===
Sandoval announced in February 2008 that he was running for judgeship on the San Francisco Superior Court in the November 2008 San Francisco general election, a few months before being termed out of the Board of Supervisors. He was one of two challengers against incumbent judge Thomas Mellon Jr., who was appointed in 1994 by Republican governor Pete Wilson. The Bar Association of San Francisco gave both challengers a "not qualified" evaluation whereas Mellon was deemed "qualified". Sandoval ran a partisan campaign, highlighting both his Democratic Party membership and Mellon's Republican Party registration.

Sandoval defeated Mellon with approximately 53% of the vote and served in the office from 2009 until his 2026 retirement.

== Personal life ==
Sandoval was married to his former campaign manager and Sonoma City Councilwoman Amy Harrington, with whom he had two daughters. They divorced in 2018.

Sandoval is bilingual in Spanish.

== See also ==
- List of Hispanic and Latino American jurists
