= CleanPowerSF =

- CleanPowerSF logo

Agency overview
- Formed: May 27, 2004
- Jurisdiction: City and County of San Francisco
- Parent agency: San Francisco Public Utilities Commission
- Website: sfpuc.org/cleanpowersf

CleanPowerSF is the City and County of San Francisco's Community Choice Aggregation (CCA) program, whose purpose is to significantly increase the proportion of electrical energy supplied to the San Francisco electrical grid from local renewable sources, decrease San Francisco's greenhouse gas (GHG) emissions, and help combat global climate change, while meeting or exceeding California's Renewable Portfolio Standard (RPS). The RPS requires that 33% of energy supplied by "investor-owned utilities, electric service providers, and community choice aggregators" should be from eligible renewable sources by 2020.

CleanPowerSF is administered by the San Francisco Public Utilities Commission (SFPUC) and monitored by the San Francisco Local Agency Formation Commission (LAFCo), which is currently chaired by Supervisor John Avalos. San Francisco's electricity supplier, Pacific Gas & Electric (PG&E), is on track but has not yet met California RPS requirements.

In 2008, the San Francisco Board of Supervisors adopted a goal of a GHG-free electric system by 2030. The city has the Electricity Resource Plan to generate, deploy and procure all of its energy from renewable, zero-GHG electric energy sources. The report identified a strong CleanPowerSF as an important part of that change.

== History ==
CleanPowerSF's 2007 Implementation Plan called for building 210 megawatts of in-city energy efficiency and new renewable generation capacity and a 150 megawatt regional wind facility within three years of the launch of the program, as well as achieving a 51 percent renewable energy portfolio within ten years. Profit from sales of 100 percent renewable energy to end users is one revenue stream that CleanPowerSF plans to use to fund the local build-out of renewable energy resources and efficiency installations.

CleanPowerSF was previously planned to launch in Spring 2014. AB 117, the state law establishing and defining CCA in California, mandates that customers be automatically enrolled in the CCA that is formed in their area. Customers who wish to continue with the investor-owned utility company may choose to opt out of the CCA. CleanPowerSF is the second CCA program to be implemented in California, following Marin Clean Energy, which launched in May 2010 and services 100,000 accounts in Marin County and the city of Richmond as of July 2013.

On June 22, 2010, the city put out a second call for bids to renewable energy suppliers for product with which to launch the program (after the first bidding process collapsed due to the selected firm's lack of financial security), and Shell Energy North America (SENA) was the only company to respond adequately to the city's bidding process. While SENA did not win the bid outright, the SFPUC authorized its General Manager to negotiate with SENA to create a program that achieved the city's goals.

SFPUC then entered into negotiations with SENA for a 4½-year non-exclusive contract to purchase 20-30 megawatts of 100 percent California-certified renewable energy. SFPUC staff reported that the power purchased from SENA will be 100 percent greenhouse gas-free and 100 percent generated by unionized facilities in California. Nonetheless, Shell's involvement in the program was challenged by some environmental and labor groups. Most prominently, IBEW Local 1245, which represents about 60 percent of PG&E employees, funded a TV, radio, and web campaign in opposition to the program. Concerns arose with the SENA contract both because of Shell's corporate reputation as a polluter and because the contract includes Renewable Energy Certificates (RECs) as part of the power mix.

Meanwhile, environmental groups such as the Sierra Club and labor organizations such as the Northern California District Council of Laborers (comprising 15 union locals) were vocal in their support of the program and in advocating for a more robust build-out of local renewable resources. These groups pointed out that CleanPowerSF will immediately begin lowering GHG emissions while also providing for numerous green jobs as the program's build-out transitions the city towards more and more locally produced clean energy—that transition itself being the means to making contracts with companies like Shell obsolete.

== Current status ==
In May 2015, SFPUC announced it is on track to resume development and launch CleanPowerSF in early 2016. On May 12, 2015, SFPUC approved a program to offer customers an option of 33%-50% California-certified renewable energy at current PG&E prices or cheaper, and an option of 100% renewable energy for at most two cents more. This model follows that of nearby CCAs that already exist in Marin and Sonoma counties.

CleanPowerSF will not include unbundled Renewable Energy Certificates (RECs) as part of its renewable energy mix, so RECs is not part of California's RPS.

Rates and power content were developed and went before SFPUC for approval in late October, 2015. The rates approved can be found on SFPUCs website.

District 10, otherwise known as the Bayview in San Francisco, is the first neighborhood in San Francisco included in Phase 1 of the CleanPowerSF program. Rolled out first to commercial customers and those customers who had pre-enrolled, clean renewable energy started flowing in May 2016.

== See also ==
- Renewable Energy
- California Solar Initiative
