= 1998 New York Underground Film Festival =

These are the films shown at the 5th New York Underground Film Festival, held from March 18–22, 1998.

Film Name	Director	Type	Length (mins)
!Aardvark!	Ken Hegan	Short Video	47
10 Seconds	Christophe Joly	Short 16mm	10
A Lick of Tasterish	Dmitry Gelfand	Experimental 16mm	10
A Portrait of the Lady	Jeremy Taylor	Documentary Video	12
A Waiter Tomorrow	Mike Kang	Short 16mm	10
Abusive Parental Guidance Suggested	Matt Kovalakides	Short 16mm	3
Acrobats and Sword-Swallowers	Michele Mahoney	Short 16mm	13
American Chain Gang	Xachery Irving	Documentary 16mm	10
Bad Girls Go to Hell	Doris Wishman	Feature 35mm	80
Battle Sounds	John Carluccio	Documentary Video	60
Black Oolong	David Grotell	Short Video	10
Blue Diary	Jenni Olson	Experimental 16mm	6
Blue Is Beautiful	James Schneider	Documentary 16mm	30
Business Lunch	Rick Trembles	Animation 16mm	4
Bystander from Hell	Matthew Harrison	Short 35mm	3
Cannibal! The Musical	Trey Parker	Feature 35mm	90
Cheesecake	Huck Botko	Documentary Video	7
Circus Redickuless	Phillip Glau	Documentary 16mm	88
City of Sleep	Jon Filthé	Short 16mm	20
Cotton Candy	Roshell Bissett	Short 16mm	46
Cup-O-Abominations	Ben Hillman	Animation 35mm	5
Deformer	Mike Mills	Documentary 16mm	17
Dirty Baby Does Fire Island	Todd Downing	Animation 16mm	9
Double Agent 73	Doris Wishman	Feature 35mm	72
Driver 23	Rolf Belgum	Documentary Video	76
Dyke Rat	Tony Nittoli	Short 16mm	4
Electric Flesh (Re-Mix)	Eric Brummer	Animation Super 8	10
Empire of Ache	Lisa Hammer	Short Super 8	9
Everybody Loves Nothing (Empathetic Exercises)	Steve Reinke	Experimental Video	11
Eye to Eye	Angela Christlieb & John Mhiripiri	Experimental Super 8/16mm	4
Fish Bait	Anthony Seck	Short 16mm	3
Flight	Sim Sadler	Short 35mm	12
Franky Goes to Hollywood	Brendan Kelly	Documentary Video	12
Free Ride	David Murphy	Documentary 16mm	35
Gas Huffin' Bad Girls!	Harry McCoy	Short 16mm	25
Glamour Puss: How To Keep Your Man Happy	Mr. Means	Short Super 8	9
God's Cocksuckers	Rick Trembles	Animation 16mm	4
Hand on the Pump	Brian Ash	Short 16mm	24
Have You Seen Patsy Wayne?	Todd Korgan	Short 16mm	7
Heavy Black Smoke Stack	Jimmy Mazzullo	Short 16mm	57
Hellzapoppin'	Gray Miller	Short 16mm	30
Hollywood Salome	Erick Ifergan	Feature 35mm	80
Home	Douglas Buck	Short 16mm	25
Hub Cap	Super 8 Stanley	Experimental Super 8	6
I Married a Strange Person	Bill Plympton	Animation 35mm	75
Jaded	Robert Banks	Experimental 35mm	3
Jefftowne	Daniel Kraus	Documentary 16mm	59
Juicy Danger Meets Burning Man	David Vaisbord	Documentary 16mm	54
Just Desserts	Eric Jewell	Short Super 8	14
Just For You Girls	M. M. Serra	Short 16mm	2
Kitty Punch	Andrew Schlussel	Short 16mm	8
Let Me Die A Woman	Doris Wishman	Feature 35mm	80
My Pretty Little Girlfriend	Rolf Belgum	Documentary Video	76
New Testament	Philip Pelletier	Short 16mm	6
Nude on the Moon	Doris Wishman	Feature 35mm	71
Number One Fan	Amy Talkington	Short 16mm	18
Oasis	James Schneider	Documentary 16mm	10
Out To Lunch	Daniel Martinico	Short 16mm	20
Planet Jersey	Steve Wilson	Short 16mm	17
Pleasure/Hurting	John Burridge	Experimental Video	1
Porn Star 2000: Les Adventures del Devilboy	Michael Maloney	Animation Video	2
Premenstrual Spotting	Machiko Saito	Experimental Video	12
Pump with a Chump	Modi	Experimental Video	3
Purgatory County	George Ratliff	Feature 35mm	92
Rapture	Gord Wilding	Short 16mm	8
Screen Tests	Nick Zedd	Experimental 16mm	15
Seaschell Beach	Holly Angel Hardman	Short 16mm	27
Seven Days Til Sunday	Reynold Reynolds	Experimental Super 8	10
Shucking the Curve	Todd Verow	Feature Video	90
Snake Feed	Debra Granik	Short 16mm	23
Soft Like Me	Jeffrey Erbach	Short 16mm	27
Somebody Goofed!	Rodney Asher & Syd Garon	Animation Video	8
Space War	Christy Karacas	Animation 16mm	3
Subconscious Cruelty (trailer)	Karim Hussain	Short 16mm	3
Surrender Dorothy	Kevin Di Novis	Feature 16mm	90
T.A.G. - The AIDS Game	Danny Roth	Short 16mm	17
Tack	Kate McCabe	Experimental 16mm	6
The Bride of Frank	Steve Ballot	Feature Video	90
The Cock Fight	Lisa DiLillo	Experimental Video	3
The Entire History of the Louisiana Purchase	Joshua Oppenheimer	Short 16mm	50
The Erotic Adventures of Alex the Clown	Keith Schofield	Animation Video	4
The Fetishist	Jim Trainor	Animation 16mm	38
The Honey Pot	Todd Lincoln	Short Super 8	7
The Misadventures of Spittle & Fudd	Tennessee Reid Norton	Animation 35mm	3
The Sore Losers	John Michael McCarthy	Feature 35mm	89
The Spirit of Christmas	Trey Parker	Animation 35mm	3
The Ultraworld	François Miron	Experimental 16mm	15
Urbana Experimental	Brien Burroughs	Experimental 16mm	7
Visitor	Franco Antico	Experimental 16mm	12
Wasted	Ian Kerkhof	Feature 16mm	100
We Hate You Little Boy	Janene Higgins	Experimental Video	3
Wig Rodeo	Marcel DeJure	Experimental Super 8	18
Wonder Woman: Battle with the Basher	Brian Winkowski & Cary Curran	Short Video/Super 8	7
Wood Technology in the Design of Structures	Eric Henry	Animation Video	9
Writer's Block	Eric Héroux	Animation 16mm	2
Year of the Pig	Greg McKean & Dan Sykes	Documentary 16mm	80
You're a Bad Boy	Dana Kristal	Short 16mm	12
Yours	Jeff Scher	Experimental 16mm	6

== See also ==
- New York Underground Film Festival site
