= Southeast Water Pollution Control Plant =

Coordinates: 37.742°N 122.391°W

The Southeast Water Pollution Control Plant, also called the Southeast Treatment Plant, is a wastewater treatment plant operated by the San Francisco Public Utilities Commission, in San Francisco, California, United States. It is located in the southeastern portion of the city in the Bayview-Hunters Point neighborhood.

Southeast is the city's primary treatment plant handling about 80% of the city's wastewater from the eastern two-thirds of the city's residents. The maximum treatment plant capacity is 250 million US gallons (950,000 m^{3}) per day, with the average daily dry weather flow of 60 million US gallons (230,000 m^{3}). The facility discharges treated water about 800 feet (240 m) into San Francisco Bay. Constructed in 1952, the 40-acre (160,000 m^{2}) facility is planned to be updated with new digesters by the mid-2020s.

== See also ==
- San José–Santa Clara Regional Wastewater Facility
