= Ephemerisle =

Festival on the Sacramento Delta

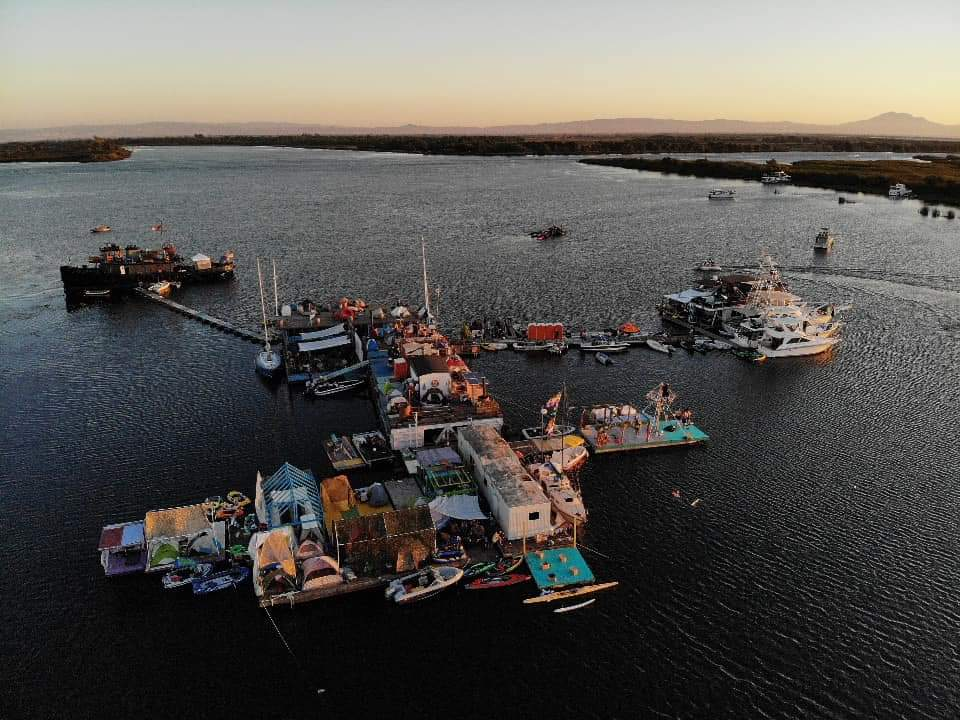
Ephemerisle 2019

Ephemerisle is an annual week-long gathering every July on the water in the Sacramento Delta of California, United States.

Several hundred attendees come together to form various "islands" made up of boats, rafts, docks, and barges. The attendees are a mix of burners, sailors, "delta rats", libertarians, and techies. Ephemerisle has no tickets and no central leadership. The one universally agreed upon rule is "no dying".

Ephemerisle has been called Burning Man on the Water, but there is no official connection between the two events.

== History ==
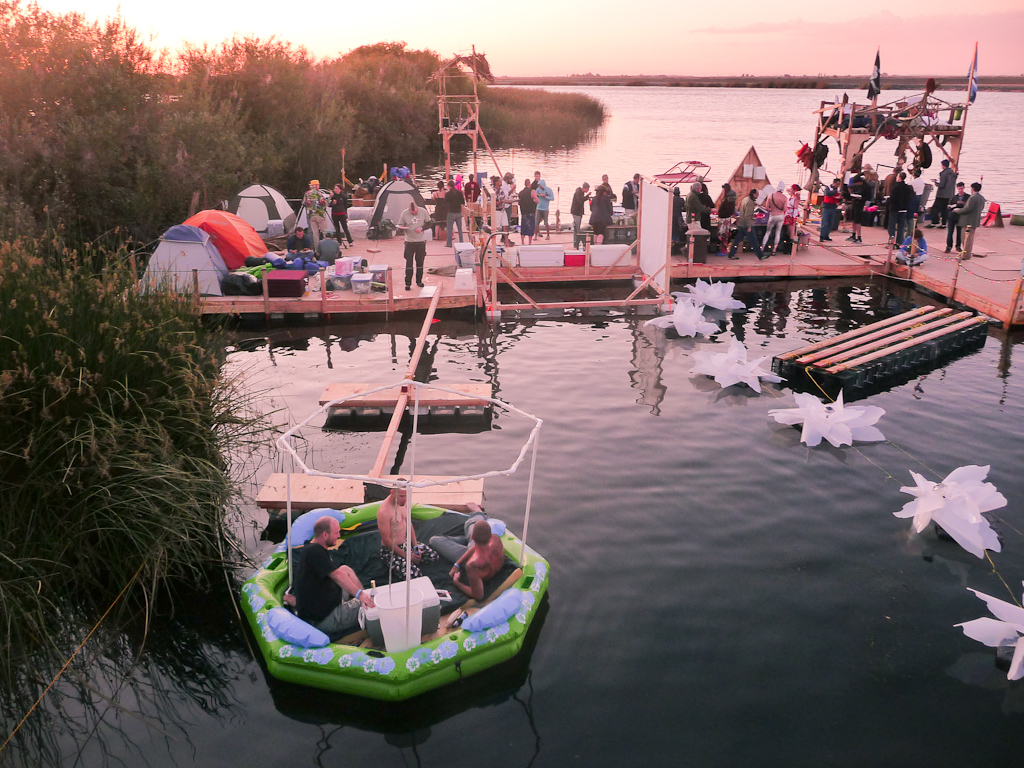
Ephemerisle 2009

Ephemerisle was founded in 2009 by the Seasteading Institute to promote their ideas of autonomous communities in international waters. Patri Friedman, co-founder of the Seasteading Institute, was inspired by Burning Man to create Ephemerisle. With its ethos of libertarianism, Ephemerisle has been described as "a celebration of laissez-faire life" which would "give people the direct experience of political autonomy".

Michael "Danger Ranger" Mikel, one of the co-founders of Burning Man, attended the first Ephemerisle. As the creator of Burning Man's internal safety force, he wanted to avoid Ephemerisle becoming "Burning Man with drowning". Chicken John designed the central platform at the first year of Ephemerisle.

After the first year, the Seasteading Institute gave up the event due to prohibitive insurance costs.

In the first year, approximately two-thirds of Ephemerisle's 100-plus attendees were Seasteaders. In 2012, there were approximately 300 attendees, a quarter of which were Seasteaders. In 2015, there were an estimated 500 attendees.

== Description ==
During the event, boats and other watercraft are connected together with planks, barrels, docks, cleats, and ropes, to form artificial islands on the water. Decks are decorated with banners, flags, and inflatable toys. From a distance, it has been described as resembling "a shapeless pile of floating junk". An attendee compared it to The Raft in Neal Stephenson's Snow Crash. Different portions of the Ephemerisle structure are designated islands, each with its own rules. A portion of the event involves the initial construction of Ephemerisle as boats join the structure and floating platforms are built. The rest of the week, participants party, meditate, and give or attend lectures.
