= Oceanside Water Pollution Control Plant =

Coordinates: 37.727637°N 122.504766°W

The Oceanside Water Pollution Control Plant, also called the Oceanside Treatment Plant, is a wastewater treatment plant operated by the San Francisco Public Utilities Commission in San Francisco, California, United States. The award-winning facility is noted for its mostly underground construction inside a hollowed-out hill. It is between Ocean Beach and Lake Merced in the far-southwest corner of the city, near the San Francisco Zoo and the California National Guard.

== Overview ==
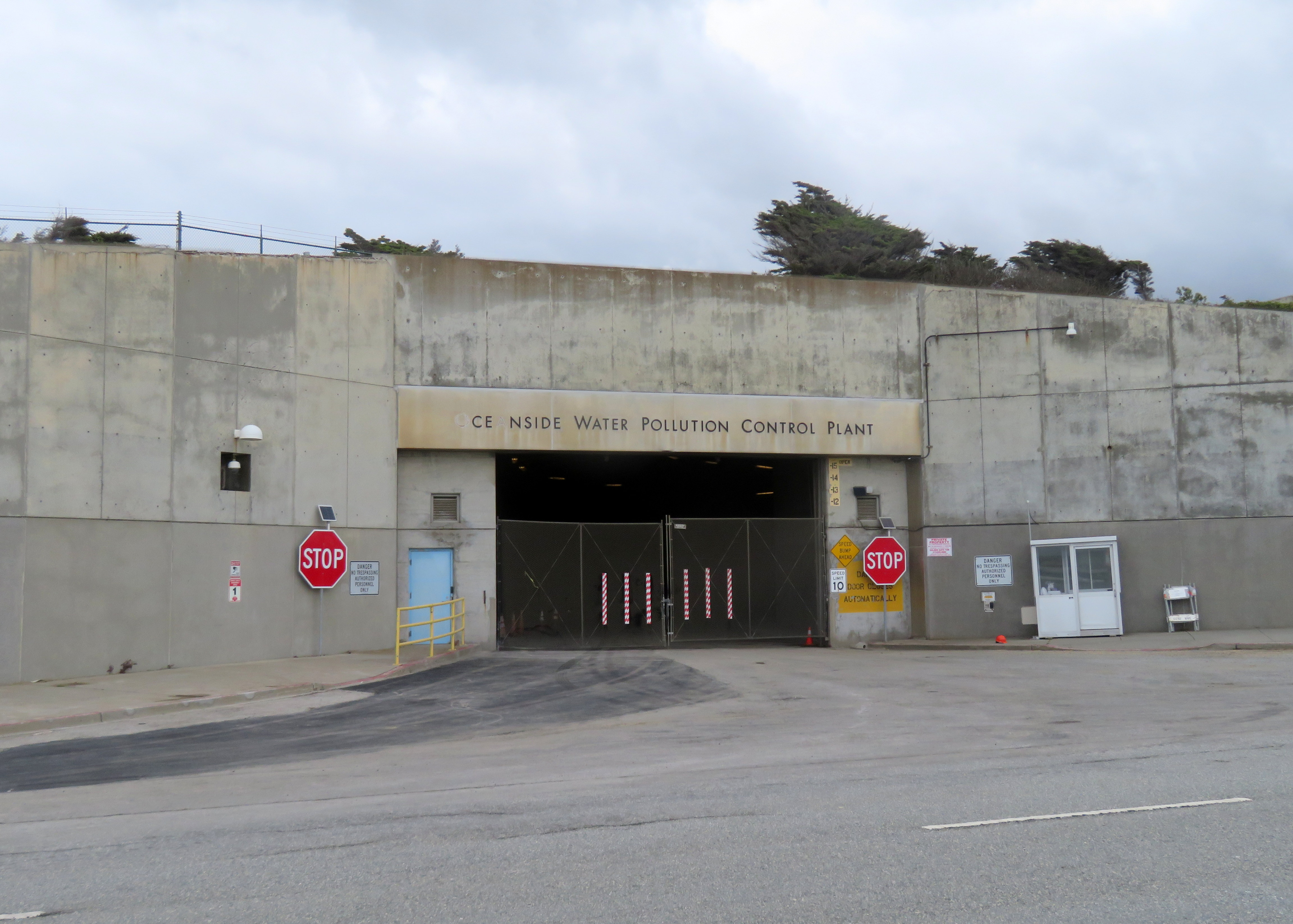
West tunnel to Oceanside Water Pollution Control Plant, March 2020

Oceanside is a secondary treatment plant handling about 20% of the city's wastewater from one-third of the city's residents. Its maximum capacity is 65 million US gallons (250,000 m^{3}) per day, with an average daily dry weather flow of 17 million US gallons (64,000 m^{3}). It discharges treated water about 4.5 miles (7.2 km) offshore into the Pacific Ocean. Construction on the US$200 million, 12-acre (49,000 m^{2}) facility began in January 1990 and was completed in June 1994. 70% of the structure is underground, covered with 6 ft (1.8 m) of earth and landscaping.

== Renaming proposal ==
In 2008, a voter group called the Presidential Memorial Commission of San Francisco proposed the facility be renamed the George W. Bush Sewage Plant in faux honor of the forty-third U.S. president, George W. Bush. By summer 2008, the effort had received a sustained burst of coverage from local and prominent national and international print and broadcast outlets. The proposal received 11,999 signatures, while only 7,168 were required for the measure. It appeared as Proposition R on the November 4, 2008 ballot, to become effective on 20 January 2009.

Organizer Brian McConnell stated the reasons for the ballot proposal and renaming.

Fifty years from now in a civics class, students will learn about the Lincoln Memorial, that other presidents are on Mount Rushmore – and George W. Bush got a sewage plant. It will prompt people to ask why, and they can discuss the Iraq war, and everything that led to it. People want to forget the bad moments of history, and this is our way of making sure that doesn't happen.

In response to a question on the White House reaction to the proposal, Press Secretary Dana Perino noted that it did not "[dignify] a response." The official argument against Proposition R in the voter handbook had suggested that, given the total amount of the federal debt at the end of the Bush administration, "Maybe it would be more appropriate to name the local bankruptcy court or a consumer credit counseling center after Bush?" The proposal failed by a wide margin with 70 percent voting no at the polls.
