= Paradox Engineering =

Paradox Engineering SA
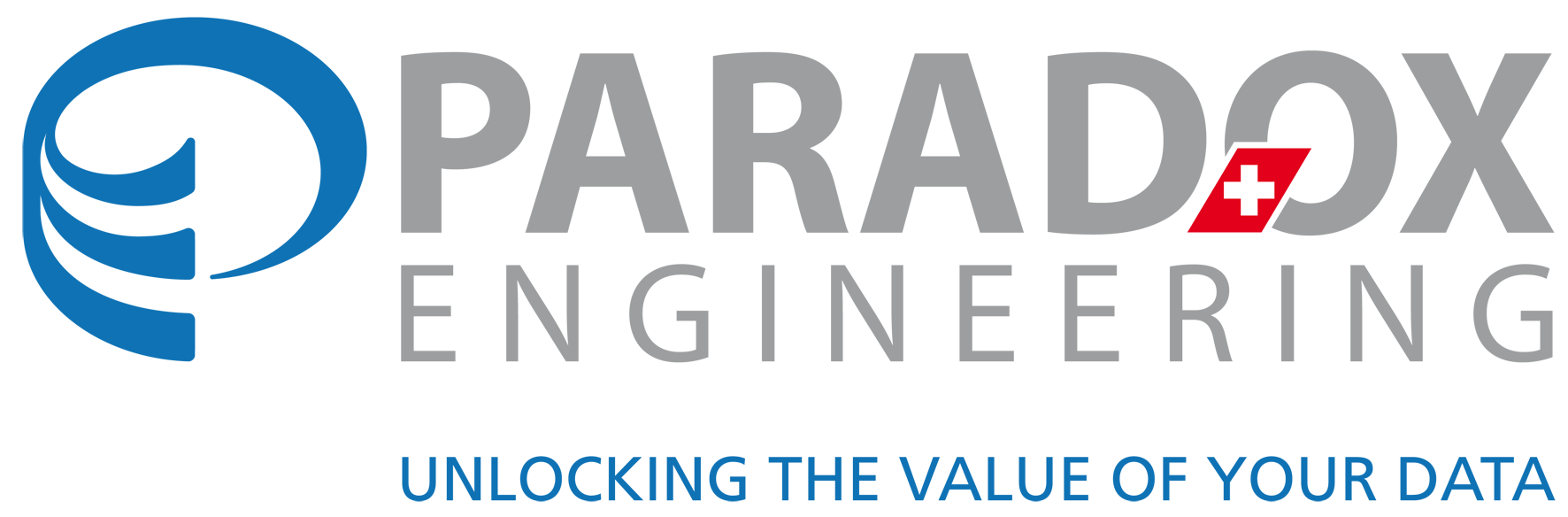
- Company type: Private
- Industry: Smart Grid, Smart City, Energy management, Machine to Machine, Internet of Things, Wireless Sensor Network, Virtual Network Operator, Advanced Metering Infrastructure, Satellite communications
- Founded: Novazzano, Ticino Canton, Switzerland (2005)
- Headquarters: Novazzano, Ticino Canton, Switzerland
- Area served: Worldwide
- Key people: Gianni Minetti, President and CEO
- Products: IPv6/6LoWPAN based communication network, Virtual Network Operator, Advanced Metering Infrastructure, Urban and Industrial Wireless Sensor Networks, OEM Solutions

Paradox Engineering SA is a Swiss technology company that designs and markets solutions and services enabling smart cities and Industry 4.0 applications. The company's mission is to offer technologies to unlock the value of data. Its solutions are ready for the Internet of things, and enable cities and companies to collect, transport, store and deliver any kind of data lying in industrial plants or urban objects, transforming information into actionable intelligence to feed business decisions.

The technologies provided by the company are based on IPv6 / 6LoWPAN open standard protocol, and fully interoperable with other systems or applications.

It was established in 2005, with headquarters in Novazzano, Switzerland. In July 2015 the Japanese Group Minebea Co. Ltd., the world's leading comprehensive manufacturer of high-precision components, acquired full capital and assets of Paradox Engineering SA. The acquisition was aimed at accelerating the success of the Group in the Internet of Things and smart markets.

== History ==
Paradox Engineering was founded in 2005 in Novazzano, Ticino Canton, Switzerland. The company was born as a telecommunication company, serving the niche market of industrial data transportation. It developed at first a one-stop-shop business model providing virtual networks to connect any customer industrial operation site and enable remote and condition monitoring programs.

In 2010 it began to design and engineer pioneer technologies to implement interoperable and highly scalable IPv6/6LoWPAN network infrastructures for industrial or urban applications.

In 2011 it entered the Smart Metering, Smart Grid and Smart City markets with the introduction of a modular solution for urban architectures (PE.AMI). Thanks to this product, the company was acknowledged with the Living Labs Global Award 2012 for presenting a wireless sensor network solution to meet the needs of San Francisco Public Utilities Commission and start a pilot project supporting the management of streetlights, Ev charging stations, electric meters and traffic signals management in the city.

In May 2013 the company launched PE.STONE, an OEM solution for developers and companies willing to build their own Internet of Things and smart applications.

In November 2013, the company announced the launch of a new vertical solution for parking management supporting utilities and municipalities to reduce traffic congestion and offering improved mobility service to citizens.

During 2013 the company unveiled two successful Smart City projects in Chiasso and Bellinzona, Switzerland.

On December 2, 2013 Minebea Co. Ltd joined the company as shareholder to strengthen the presence in Smart City/Smart Grid, smart building and industrial sensor network markets.

The company continued to grow in the Smart City market. In May 2015 Tinynode SA entered Paradox Engineering's ecosystem. As Tinynode was specialized in wireless vehicle detection systems, the two companies aimed at positioning as unique enabler of any kind of smart environment through compelling solutions for the Internet of Things.

From July 2015 Paradox Engineering is part of MinebeaMitsumi Group. Leveraging Paradox Engineering as IoT Excellence Center, the Group is accelerating the development of solutions for a fully networked IoT society, including applications for automotive, medical, consumer, industrial and Smart Cities markets.

In 2020 the company launched a Smart Waste application. Latest developments relate to blockchain and cybersecurity services for Smart Cities.
