= Newby Island landfill =

Large active landfill in San Francisco Bay Area

Coordinates: 37.458916°N 121.944038°W

The Newby Island Landfill (NISL) is one of the largest active landfills on the shores of the San Francisco Bay. It is located in Santa Clara County, California in the United States.

The site is located within the city limits of San Jose, California at the western terminus of Dixon Landing Road. The address is 1601 Dixon Landing Road, Milpitas. Although the address and public street access to the site are both in the City of Milpitas, the landfill property is entirely within the City of San Jose. Newby Island Landfill has a length of 5.07 km (3.15 mi). It is located West of the City of Milpitas near Dixon Landing Road and Interstate 880.

It is the terminus for waste for all of San Jose (62%), Santa Clara (14%), Milpitas (10%), Cupertino (5%), Los Altos (2%) and other cities (7%). The 342-acre (138.4 ha) pile is currently permitted to operate until 2041 and may extend up to 245 feet. The landfill is an island surrounded by a levee which keeps its runoff from directly entering the bay, and the water that drains from it is treated in the landfill's own treatment plant. Electricity for the landfill is generated by burning the methane collected from the decomposition of the waste. Dried sewage sludge from the nearby San José–Santa Clara Regional Wastewater Facility is the material used as cover, mixed in with the trash, blending San Jose's waste streams.

It is operated by Republic Services (Republic), which, along with Waste Management Incorporated, transports and disposes of most of the household trash in the United States.

Materials that pass through the gate of NISL include waste that is disposed in the landfill; clean soil that is used for cover and for temporary roadways; construction and demolition (C&D) debris that is sorted, recycled, and processed for re-use both on-site and elsewhere; and materials that are used for alternative daily cover (ADC), which include but are not limited to biosolids, processed C&D debris, contaminated soil, green waste, and organic material from the on-site composting operations. In addition to C&D waste, bulky recyclables including appliances, tires, carpet, and cardboard are sent to NISL and either are recycled or diverted for beneficial use. Incoming organics received at the landfill are processed (i.e., ground) and utilized as mulch for erosion control on-site and alternative daily cover or are sent off-site to be used as biofuel, for erosion control, or as a soil additive.

The entire site is now called the Newby Island Resource Recovery Park. The site includes both the Newby Island Landfill and the Recyclery.

== History ==
The Newby Island landfill opened in 1938. It operated as an open burning dump until 1956 when it became a landfill. In 1956, the San Jose Scavenger Company started the landfill operations.

In 1968, it was annexed into the city of San Jose as a non-conforming zone.

In 1973, Browning-Ferris Industries (BFI) of Northern California began operation of this site late in 1973.

In 1981, a 166-acre (67 ha) expansion was approved, making Newby Island Landfill the largest landfill in the San Francisco Bay Area.

In 1994, composting operations started on the Newby site. Later a settlement agreement between the City of Milpitas, City of San Jose, Browning-Ferris Industries, and the International Disposal Company of California resulted in some odor mitigation strategies, such as relocation of the composting area to the westernmost section of the landfill to reduce the odor impact.

In 1999, BFI was sold to Allied Industries.

In 2007, a 95 feet (29 m) height expansion was proposed and approved by San Jose in 2012.

In 2008, Allied Waste was acquired by Republic Services Group based in Florida.

In August 2012, Republic Services announced the Newby Island Resource Recovery Park located on the same site, the world's largest recycling operation. It processes up to 110 short tons (100,000 kg) per hour of multiple waste streams. The facility will process all of the commercial waste generated by businesses in San Jose. Newby Island houses the local hauling company, recyclery, composting facility and landfill.

In 2014, Allied Waste submitted a permit to increase the capacity enough to hold 245 towering feet msl of trash from the current allowed height of 150 feet (46 m). The capacity would increase from 50.8 million cubic yards (38.8 million cubic meters) to 65.9 million cubic yards (50.38 million cubic meters). The new closure date would be 2041. Despite appeals and protests from the City of Milpitas and its citizens, the permit was approved by the San Jose Planning commission on December 7, 2016.

In 2016, Republic Services settled a class-action lawsuit over the alleged landfill odor pollution. Republic will create a $1.2 million fund to be paid to households within a 1.5-mile (2.4 km) radius from the landfill. In addition, Republic agreed to provide $2 million to mitigate odors over the next five years. Odor mitigation will include updating the gas collection system and also modifying the composting operation to use forced air static piles.

Also in 2016, Newby Island landfill started the South Bay Odor Stakeholders Group to bring together various agencies and facilities producing odor. Although they are holding meetings, it is too early to see if they will be able to make a difference in the odor pollution issues in the area. Many agencies and facilities are refusing to attend the meeting. Also the group doesn't have any enforcement powers.

Also in 2016, the City of Milpitas decided against using Newby Island Landfill for solid waste disposal. Milpitas also decided not to select Republic Services (the owner of the Newby island facility) to do garbage collections. Residents worried that the Milpitas City Council might allow whoever was awarded the collection contract to take the city's garbage to Newby Island drafted Measure L for the Nov 2016 ballot. Mipitas voters overwhelmingly supported sending the city's garbage to a different landfill owned by Waste Management, Kirby Canyon Landfill. Garden City Sanitation was selected as the new waste collector. This ended Republic's long contract with the City of Milpitas for both garbage collections and disposal.

	1997 permit	Current permit (2014)
Design capacity	50.8 million cubic yards	65.9 million cubic yards
Maximum elevation	150 feet above mean sea level	245 feet (75 m)
Estimated closure date	2025	2041
Permitted disposal area	308 acres (125 ha)	298 acres (121 ha)
Permitted traffic volume	Equivalent of 4,000 tons (3.63 million kg) per day	1,269 waste vehicles per day (does not include employees, visitors, vendors, regulatory personnel)
