= Circus Redickuless =

Traveling circus

Circus Redickuless was a traveling circus created by punk-rock impresario Chicken John Rinaldi in 1995 in association with Michael Gump.

== History ==
Formed in Los Angeles, largely with members of the LA and San Francisco Cacophony Society, the circus was formed on the premise of being completely without talent. No actual performers were allowed, only non-performers without any experience or desire to create professional acts. Original line up included the Amazing Jarico Reese (now of Cyclecide Bike Rodeo) the talentless magician, Speed Metal tap dance: two girls barely tap dancing to heavy metal, Dammit the Amazing Wonder Dog: Chicken John's pet dog that couldn't jump through a hoop, The Vegan Geek, Tall Pall (whose amazing skill was being tall), The Talking Mime, The Mad Cow (an angry Punk in a cow suit), The Flaming Vomiteer (developed by Steve Wilkerson ['96], wherein he would vomit on stage and set it on fire) and many other equally talentless acts.

The Circus Redickuless toured for four years in various forms with a revolving cast of troupe members.

The 1995 tour was documented in Phillip Glau's film called Circus Redickuless which subsequently won "Best Documentary" at the 1998 New York Underground Film Festival.
