= 2007 San Francisco mayoral election =

- November 6, 2007
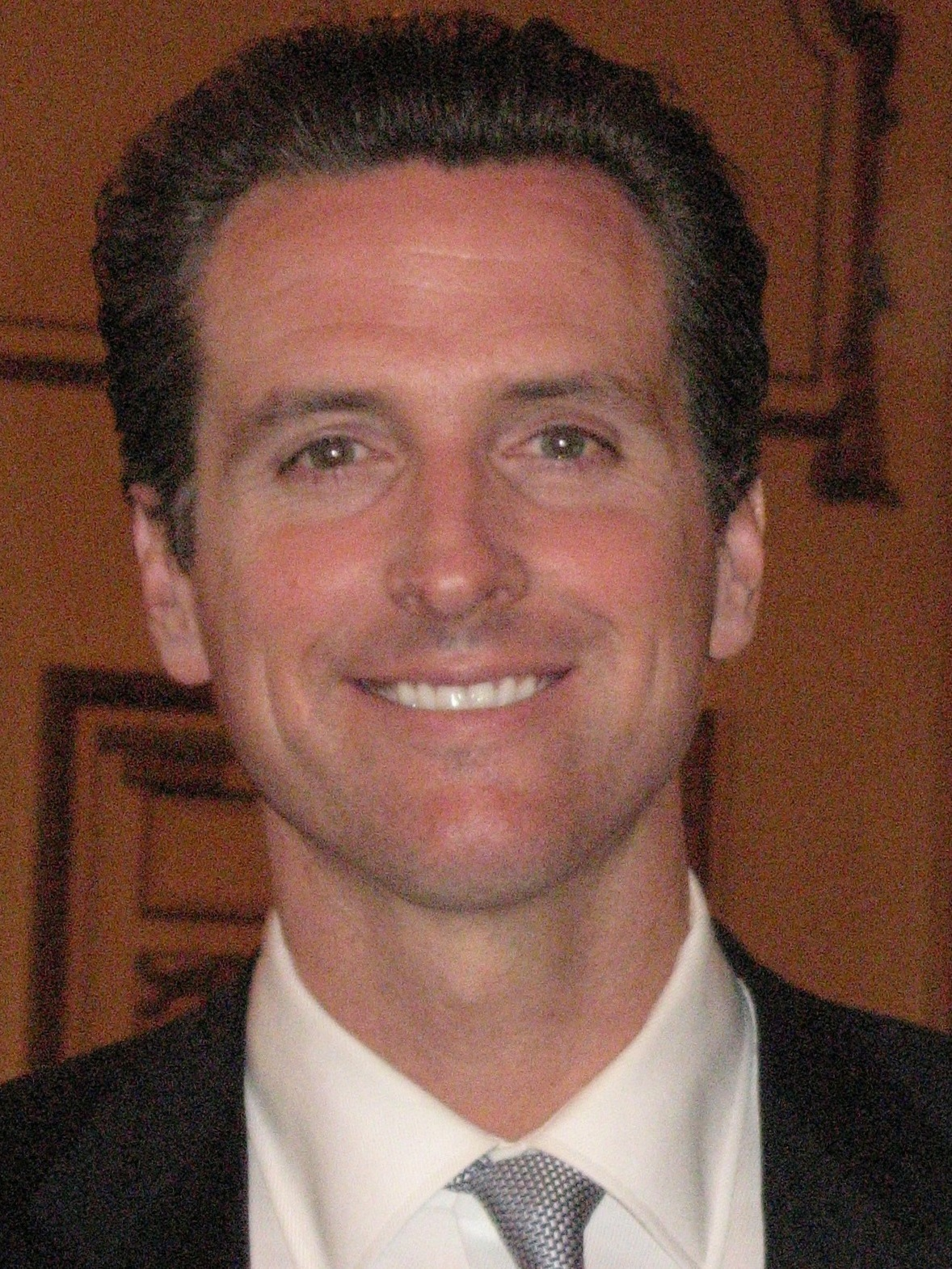

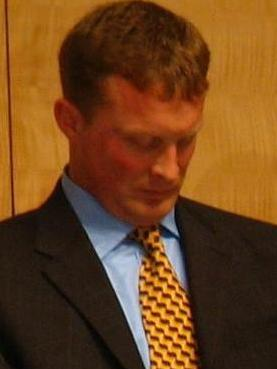

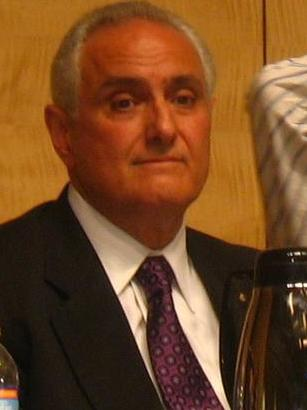

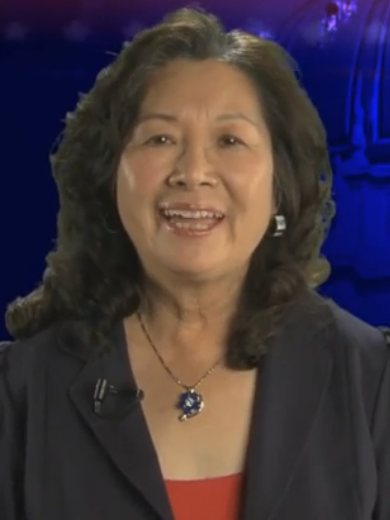
Candidate	Gavin Newsom	Quintin Mecke
Party	Democratic	Democratic
Popular vote	105,596	9,076
Percentage	73.66%	6.33%
Candidate	Harold Hoogasian	Wilma Pang
Party	Republican	Peace and Freedom
Popular vote	8,400	7,274
Percentage	5.86%	5.07%
Mayor before election
Gavin Newsom
Democratic
Reelected Mayor
Gavin Newsom
Democratic

The 2007 San Francisco mayoral election occurred on November 6, 2007. Voters elected a Mayor of San Francisco and several local officials. Incumbent Mayor Gavin Newsom was re-elected by an overwhelming margin. There were 12 candidates on the ballot as well as 6 write-ins.

Besides Newsom, other notable candidates included Josh Wolf, a journalist who was jailed for refusing to testify and turn over video evidence to a federal grand jury. Another candidate, "Chicken" John Rinaldi, qualified for public financing of his campaign but ran into procedural difficulties with San Francisco's Election Commission.

It was the first mayoral election in San Francisco history to use instant-runoff voting, also known as ranked-choice voting, so that there would be no need for a run-off, but a majority was reached in the first round and votes were not redistributed. The results of the election were not known for weeks because every ballot had to be hand-counted due to the long-running feud between the Elections Department of San Francisco and the California Secretary of State.

== Issues ==
Many ongoing and emerging issues might have influenced this election, including:

- Newsom's popularity – Newsom's approval rating remained high throughout his first term.
- Same-sex marriage – Newsom's 2004 directive permitting the issuance of marriage licenses to same-sex couples played a key role in garnering wide approval from the largely liberal city.
- Potholes, infrastructure, deferred maintenance, and the mayor's plans to improve Muni.
- Keeping the San Francisco 49ers football team within city limits, as the team had threatened to move to a more spacious suburban stadium in Santa Clara County. The move would have created a situation similar to that of the New York Jets and New York Giants, who both play at the MetLife Stadium.
- The city's high homicide rate had potential to hurt Newsom during the campaign. A national survey gave San Francisco low marks for public safety. Indeed, San Francisco ranked well below both Los Angeles and New York City.
- Homelessness and transportation issues from previous years remained relevant. Public perception of the mayor's "Care, Not Cash" program (which reduced welfare payments in favor of long-term subsidized housing) likely informed the debate.
- On February 1, 2007, Newsom admitted to having an affair with his campaign manager's wife, who was working in City Hall. Newsom later apologized about the scandal.

== Results ==
Municipal elections in California are officially non-partisan, though most candidates in San Francisco do receive funding and support from various political parties.

San Francisco mayoral election, 2007
Party	Candidate	Votes	%
Democratic	Gavin Newsom (incumbent)	105,596	73.66
Democratic	Quintin Mecke	9,076	6.33
Republican	Harold Hoogasian	8,400	5.86
Peace and Freedom	Wilma Pang	7,274	5.07
Independent	Ahimsa Sumchai	3,398	2.37
Green	Chicken John	2,508	1.75
Democratic	Lonnie Holmes	1,807	1.26
Green	Josh Wolf	1,772	1.24
Workers World	Grasshopper Kaplan	1,423	0.99
Independent	Harold Brown	915	0.64
Libertarian	George Davis	644	0.45
American Independent	Michael Powers	519	0.36
Independent	Lea Sherman (write-in)	9	0.01
Independent	Rodney Hauge (write-in)	6	0.00
Independent	Patrick Monette-Shaw (write-in)	6	0.00
Independent	Kenneth Kahn (write-in)	3	0.00
Independent	Robert Kully (write-in)	2	0.00
Independent	Robert McCullough (write-in)	1	0.00
Total votes		143,359	100.00
Democratic hold			
