= Juanita More =

American drag artist and activist

- More in 2023
- Born: Fremont, California
- Occupations: Drag artist, activist

Juanita More, stylized as Juanita MORE!, is an American drag artist and activist. She (Note: More uses she/her pronouns while in drag and he/him while outside of drag. For the sake of clarity, this article will use exclusively she/her pronouns.) is best known for her work in the San Francisco Bay Area, where she has been an active drag queen since 1992. She has raised over US$1 million dollars for charities in the area. She is the subject of at least five murals in San Francisco, and has been the subject of two retrospectives of her fashion and style. She is also a political activist.

== Biography ==
More was born in Fremont, California, and raised in Hayward with the first name Michael. Her parents were immigrant farmworkers from Coahuila and had a large vinyl collection. During her childhood, she learned how to cook from her grandmother and aunts. She has stated that from a young age she would rather be cooking in the kitchen than playing outside. She also frequently created art projects and put on shows as a child. At 18, she came out to her mother.

In 1983, she began volunteering to do hospice work for AIDS patients in San Francisco. In 1987, she moved to New York City, where she created her own catering company. There, she met Glamamore, also known as Mr. David, a drag queen who she soon became close to. Glamamore went on to come to San Francisco with her in 1991, and put her in drag for the first time on Halloween 1992. Glamamore would subsequently design all of More's outfits.

By 1993, she was regularly performing as a drag queen. She has stated that much of her early confidence came from being drunk. She has since become a "drag queen superstar" in San Francisco. She has her own branded coffee, partnered with Ritual Coffee Roasters. She also continues to cook for her events.

As of 2024, she had celebrated her 33rd birthday every year for 24 years. Since 2012, she has celebrated it with a naked birthday party. She also organizes a major pride party in the city every year, which was rated as a must-see by San Francisco pride participants. All of her events fundraise for various LGBTQ+-focused charities, such as the Transgender Law Center. As of 2024, she had fundraised over US$1 million dollars. In 2026, she stated she had raised more than US$1.5 million.

== Political activism ==
More is also a political activist who creates her own election guide, called the Queer Agenda Voting Guide. She fundraises and campaigns for candidates. In 2016 she campaigned for Jane Kim for California State Senator, and in 2018 she campaigned for Mark Leno and Rafael Mandelman. In 2020, she founded the People's March and Rally in support of LGBTQ+ people and people of color. That year, it replaced her pride party, though in subsequent years she held both. She has vocally advocated against Donald Trump.

== Awards and recognition ==
She was named a Saint by the Sisters of Perpetual Indulgence in 2006. She was also named Empress of the Imperial Court System of San Francisco, the largest of the drag-focused Imperial Court Systems. She was the subject of a 2016 retrospective of her fashion and style, "Mr. David for Juanita More! 24 Years of More" at the De Young Museum, and a 2022 retrospective titled "Juanita: 30 Years Of MORE!" by the San Francisco Arts Commission. Her hat collection was shown by the San Francisco Museum of Modern Art in 2026.

As of 2019, San Francisco had at least four murals of her. A further mural of her with Glamamore was painted in 2022. Another mural of her was painted in 2023, but defaced less than a month later.

== Personal life ==
In 1994, More was diagnosed with stage four Hodgkin lymphoma, which recurred multiple times. She has a French Bulldog named Jackson.
