= San José–Santa Clara Regional Wastewater Facility =

American local government building in California

Coordinates: 37°25′52″N 121°57′6″W

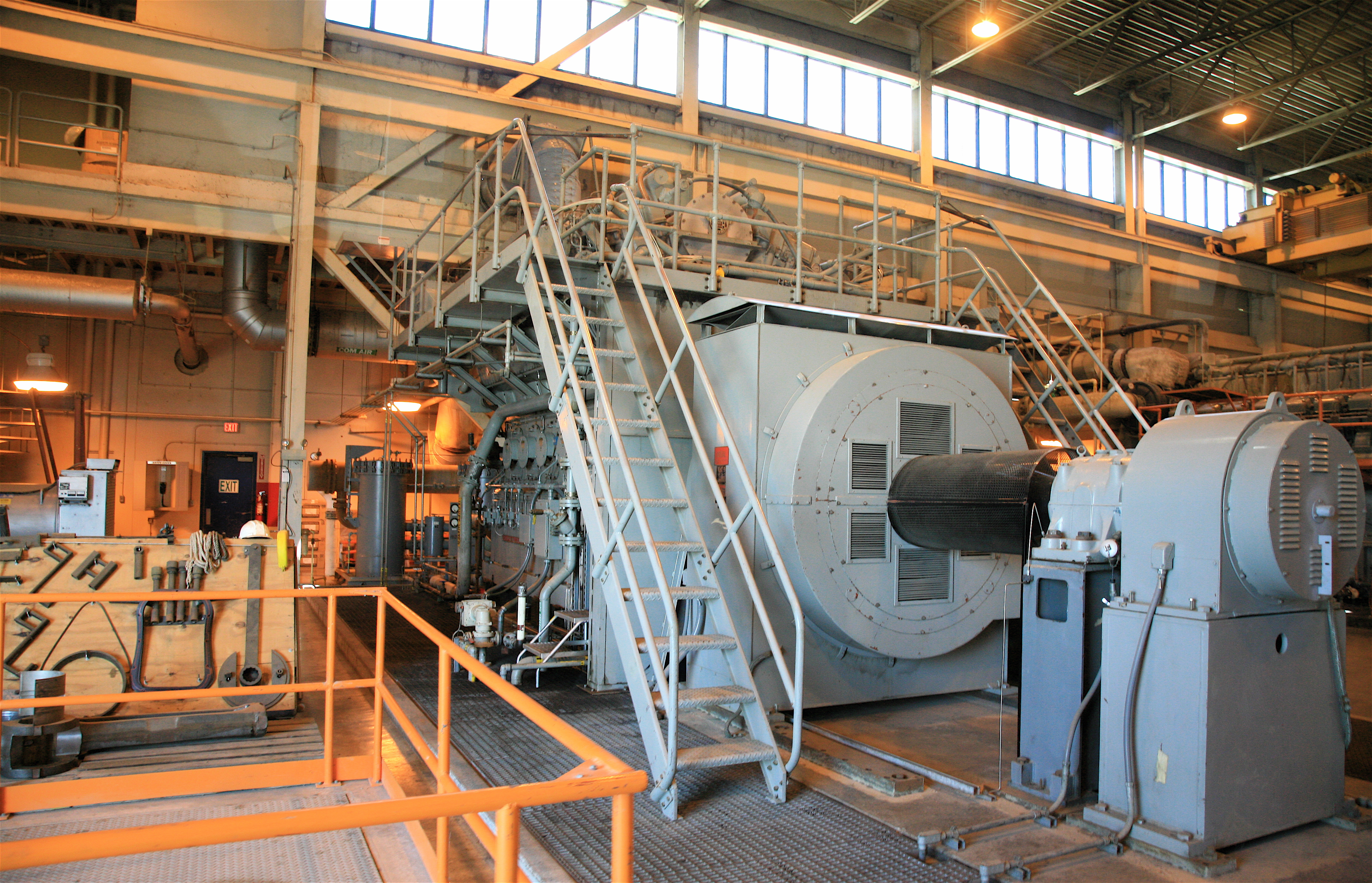
One of four large air pumps at the wastewater treatment plant.

The San José–Santa Clara Regional Wastewater Facility (abbreviated RWF; officially the San Jose/Santa Clara Water Pollution Control Plant) is a wastewater treatment plant located in the Alviso neighborhood of San Jose, California. The facility treats 110 million U.S. gallons (420 megaliters) of wastewater per day, with a capacity of up to 167 million U.S. gal/d (630 ML/d), making it the largest tertiary treatment plant in the western United States. It serves 1.5 million residents and over 17,000 business facilities in eight cities. The 2,600-acre (1,100 ha) site is operated by the San Jose Environmental Services Department and jointly owned by the cities of San Jose and Santa Clara. It began operations in 1956 to address severe water pollution issues and played a key role in San Jose's aggressive annexation program during the 1950s and 1960s.

== Location ==
The site sits on more than 2,600 acres (1,100 ha) on the southern end of the San Francisco Bay, adjacent to the Don Edwards San Francisco Bay National Wildlife Refuge. It consists of a 175-acre (71 ha) processing area, a 750-acre (300 ha) sludge-drying area, a 850-acre (340 ha) former salt evaporation pond, and open buffer space. About 200 acres (81 ha) is set aside for the Western burrowing owl, a California species of special concern. The plant's outfall channel is Artesian Slough, which flows into the San Francisco Bay via Coyote Creek.

== History ==
In the 1880s, San Jose built a simple sewage disposal system that discharged untreated wastewater directly into the San Francisco Bay. It was the largest sewage disposal system in the South Bay, with enough capacity for 250,000 people despite a population under 15,000, in order to discharge organic waste from the city's many fruit canneries. By the 1930s, the canneries along with indoor plumbing increasingly contributed to pollution in the bay. However, voters rejected bonds to fund upgrades to the sewage system. By 1948, the state declared San Jose to be in violation of state water pollution regulations, risking a moratorium on building permits.

In 1950, San Jose voters finally passed bonds to construct a new wastewater treatment facility. In 1954, the city purchased land near Alviso for a wastewater treatment plant. The plant began operations in 1956. Despite having only primary treatment capabilities designed for cannery effluent, it was the first and largest treatment plant in the South Bay, giving it outsized importance in the region's development. In 1951, the city council banned connections to the sewage system from outside the city limits, giving San Jose City Manager Dutch Hamann leverage against neighboring cities and landowners in his annexation campaigns. Hamann's agents instigated local campaigns in Alviso and Milpitas to agree to annexation and give San Jose more control over its sewer infrastructure. San Jose succeeded in annexing Alviso in 1968.

On May 6, 1959, the City of San José and City of Santa Clara signed a joint powers agreement, "Agreement between San Jose and Santa Clara Respecting Sewage Treatment Plant", giving Santa Clara 20% ownership in exchange for helping to fund upgrades at the plant, which was renamed the San Jose/Santa Clara Water Pollution Control Plant. In 1964, the plant added secondary treatment capabilities to meet state requirements. In the 1960s and 1970s, Milpitas, the Cupertino Sanitary District, and the West Valley Sanitation District began contracting with the plant. In 1979, the plant added tertiary treatment. From September 4 to September 29, 1979, 4 billion U.S. gallons (15 gigaliters) of partially treated sewage flowed into Artesian Slough, much of it reaching the southernmost portion of the San Francisco Bay, where massive wildlife die-offs were reported.

In 1996, the plant opened a 12,000-square-foot (1,100 m^{2}) laboratory to monitor performance. In 1998, the South Bay Water Recycling facility began providing water reclamation service. In early 2013, the wastewater treatment plant was renamed the San José–Santa Clara Regional Wastewater Facility, though it retained its former name for legal purposes. A $114 million cogeneration facility was completed in August 2020, featuring a façade by Buster Simpson that is illuminated at night.

== Operations ==
As of 2020, the facility treats 110 million U.S. gallons (420 megaliters) of wastewater per day, with a capacity of up to 167 million U.S. gal/d (630 ML/d). Most effluent is discharged into Artesian Slough. However, an average 14 million U.S. gal/d (53 ML/d) of treated wastewater is diverted to the adjacent South Bay Water Recycling (SBWR) plant and distributed as reclaimed water to about 750 customers in San Jose, Santa Clara, and Milpitas. Solids removed from the effluent are processed into class A biosolids, which are used as daily cover at Newby Island landfill. The plant's laboratory analyzes about 70,000 samples per year.

The facility has an annual operating budget of about $80 million, funded by rate revenue from contracting agencies. It has about 200 employees. It consumes 11 megawatts (15,000 hp) per day, about 60% of which is powered by biogas and natural gas from the plant's cogeneration facility and digester tanks. A diesel generator provides emergency backup power for the plant. Discharges are monitored by the San Francisco Bay Regional Water Quality Control Board, and emissions are regulated by the Bay Area Air Quality Management District.

== Service area ==
As of 2020, the facility serves 1.5 million residents and over 17,000 business facilities in the following Santa Clara County jurisdictions, which maintain separate collection infrastructure:

- San Jose
- Santa Clara
- Milpitas
- Cupertino Sanitary District (Cupertino)
- West Valley Sanitation District (Campbell, Los Gatos, Monte Sereno, and Saratoga)
- Santa Clara County Sanitation District No. 2-3 (unincorporated)
- Burbank Sanitary District (unincorporated Burbank)

== See also ==
- Donald M. Somers Water Pollution Control Plant in Sunnyvale
- Palo Alto Regional Water Quality Control Plant
- South County Regional Wastewater Authority in Gilroy
- Southeast Water Pollution Control Plant in San Francisco
