= Four Barrel Coffee =

Coffee roaster based in San Francisco, California

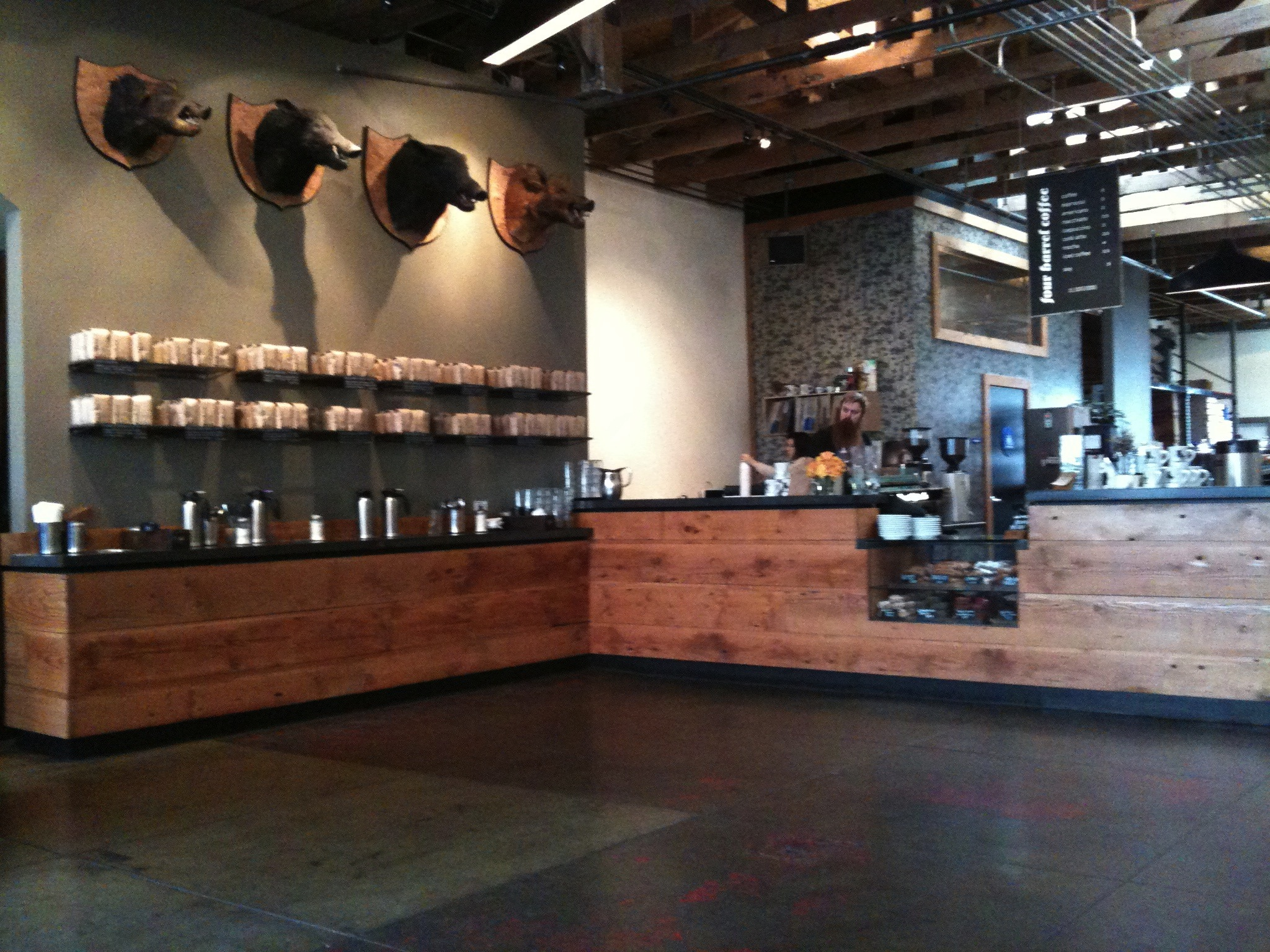
- Four Barrel's Valencia Street location
- Industry: Coffee
- Founded: 2008; 18 years ago
- Headquarters: San Francisco, California
- Number of locations: 2
- Website: fourbarrelcoffee.com

Four Barrel Coffee is a coffee roaster based in San Francisco, California, with two cafes in San Francisco. Like competitors Ritual Coffee Roasters and Blue Bottle, Four Barrel is among local, independent companies which roast their own beans, wholesale, and operate cafes. Unique among local coffeeshops, Four Barrel does not provide free Wi-Fi or power for laptops. Four Barrel opened in 2008 and was started by one of the founders of Ritual, with its first location in the Mission District. In April 2017, Benny Gold collaborated with Four Barrel Coffee to offer, limited edition commemorative product.

In January 2018 eight former employees filed suit against Four Barrel and its founder Jeremy Tooker, alleging that he sexually assaulted multiple women and created a toxic workplace culture for non male employees. The company settled the lawsuit out of court and Tooker left the company and divested his shares in it. The remaining owners were reportedly planning to rebuild the company with a 100% employee owned model. Multiple companies have ceased to carry Four Barrel product in the wake of the suit. As of seven months later the company has not made a transition to being worker owned and "will not for the foreseeable future," according to co-owners Tal Mor and Jodi Geren. They cite a lack of profitability and have pledged to begin profit sharing with employees by the end of the year, should the business stabilize.

In 2021, Geren and Mor launched a new hospitality concept in San Francisco’s Hayes Valley. The project, named Loquat, was conceived as a sister business to Four Barrel Coffee, combining a daytime bakery service with an evening wine bar. Located at 198 Gough Street in the former space of 20th Century Café, the venue was announced with plans to open in late 2021.

In 2025, Wired included the Valencia Street location of Four Barrel Coffee in its Guide to San Francisco for Business Travelers, highlighting it as a recommended stop for visitors to the city.
