= Kate McCabe =

Kate McCabe is an Irish author and former journalist. She is the bestselling author of many fictional books, including The Beach Bar, Forever Friends, The Music of Love, and Magnolia Park. Her career as a writer started in 2005, when her first book, Hotel Les Flores, was published.

== Bibliography ==
- Hotel Las Flores, Poolbeg Press, Dublin, 2005, ISBN 1842232193
- The Beach Bar, Poolbeg Press, Dublin, 2006, ISBN 184223238X
- The Book Club, Poolbeg Press, Dublin, 2007, ISBN 9781842233153
- Forever Friends, Poolbeg Press, Dublin, 2008, ISBN 9781842233498
- Casa Clara, Poolbeg Press, Dublin, 2010, ISBN 9781842233559
- Magnolia Park, Poolbeg Press, Dublin, 2012, ISBN 9781842235010
- The Man of Her Dreams, Hachette Books, Dublin, 2013, ISBN 9781444726299
- The Spanish Letter, Hachette Books, Dublin, 2014, ISBN 9781444726329
- The Music of Love, Hachette Books, Dublin, 2015, ISBN 9781444726329
- The Love of Her Life, Hachette Books, Dublin, 2016, ISBN 9781473609723
