= San Francisco Public Utilities Commission =

American local government agency

Agency overview
- Formed: 1932
- Jurisdiction: City and County of San Francisco
- Headquarters: 525 Golden Gate Ave., San Francisco, CA 94102
- Employees: ~2,700
- Annual budget: US$3.5 billion (operating and capital combined, 2023-24)
- Agency executive: Dennis J. Herrera, General Manager
- Website: sfpuc.gov

The San Francisco Public Utilities Commission (SFPUC) is a public agency of the City and County of San Francisco that provides water, wastewater, and electric power services to the city. The SFPUC also provides wholesale water service to an additional 1.9 million customers in three other San Francisco Bay Area counties.

== Functions ==
The SFPUC manages a complex water supply system consisting of reservoirs, tunnels, pipelines and treatment facilities and is the third largest municipal utility agency in California. The SFPUC provides fresh water from Hetch Hetchy Reservoir and other sources to 2.7 million customers for residential, commercial, and industrial uses. About one-third of its delivered water is sent to customers within San Francisco, while the remaining two-thirds are sent to customers in Alameda, San Mateo, and Santa Clara counties.

The SFPUC has been a clean power provider for more than 100 years, when it began generating hydro power for the construction of the O'Shaughnessy Dam. The SFPUC Power Enterprise includes two power programs: Hetch Hetchy Power and CleanPowerSF.

Hetch Hetchy Power generates and delivers 100% greenhouse gas-free energy to more than 6,300 customer accounts, including municipal buildings and facilities, such as San Francisco General Hospital, San Francisco International Airport, schools, libraries and the Muni transit system. Hetch Hetchy Power also provides electricity to some commercial and residential developments, including affordable housing sites.

The SFPUC also administers and operates CleanPowerSF, a Community Choice Aggregation program within the guidelines of California State law.

Together, the SFPUC’s two power programs meet over 75% of the electricity demand in San Francisco. In 2023, CleanPowerSF and Hetch Hetchy Power collectively saved customers more than $170 million on electric bills compared to for-profit utility PG&E.

The SFPUC manages an extensive wastewater system that collects, conveys, and provides secondary treatment to combined sewage flows (both stormwater and sewage) within the City & County of San Francisco before discharging it into the San Francisco Bay and the Pacific Ocean. The Southeast Water Pollution Control Plant handles about 80% of the city's wastewater, while the Oceanside Water Pollution Control Plant handles the remaining 20%. A third facility, the North Point Wet-Weather Facility, only operates during wet weather to provide primary treatment to combined sewage prior to discharging to the San Francisco Bay.

== Historical origins ==
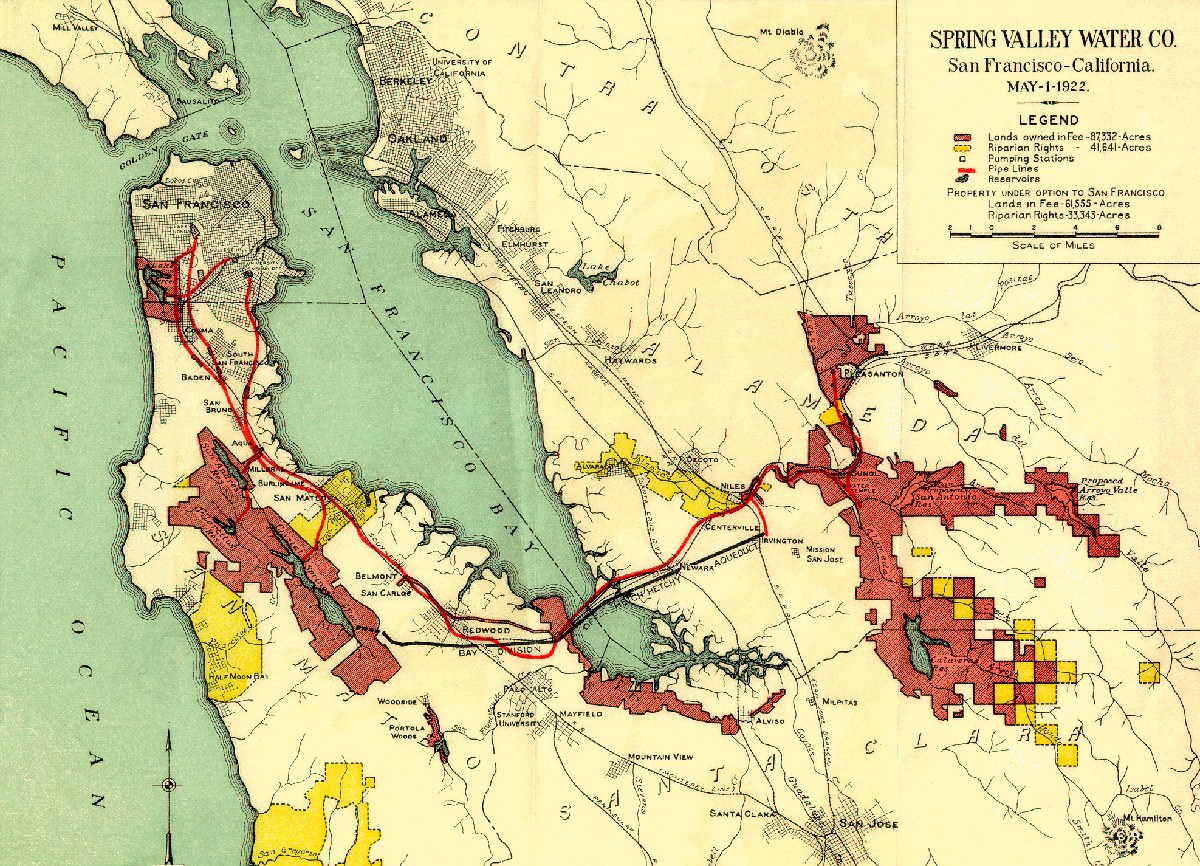
1922 map showing the pipelines of the SVWC and the Sunol Water Temple

From the mid-19th Century, much of the Alameda County watershed was owned by the Spring Valley Water Company (SVWC), a private enterprise which held a monopoly on water service to San Francisco.

In 1906, William Bowers Bourn II, a major stockholder in the SVWC, and owner of the giant Empire Mine, hired Willis Polk to design a "water temple" atop the spot where three subterranean water mains converge, from the Arroyo de la Laguna and Alameda Creeks, the Sunol infiltration galleries, and a 30-inch pipeline from the artesian well field of Pleasanton.

Municipal efforts to buy out the SVWC had been a source of constant controversy from as early as 1873, when the first attempt to purchase it was turned down by San Francisco voters because the price was too high. Other sources claim that as one born into wealth and classically educated, Bourn was partially motivated by a sense of civic responsibility.

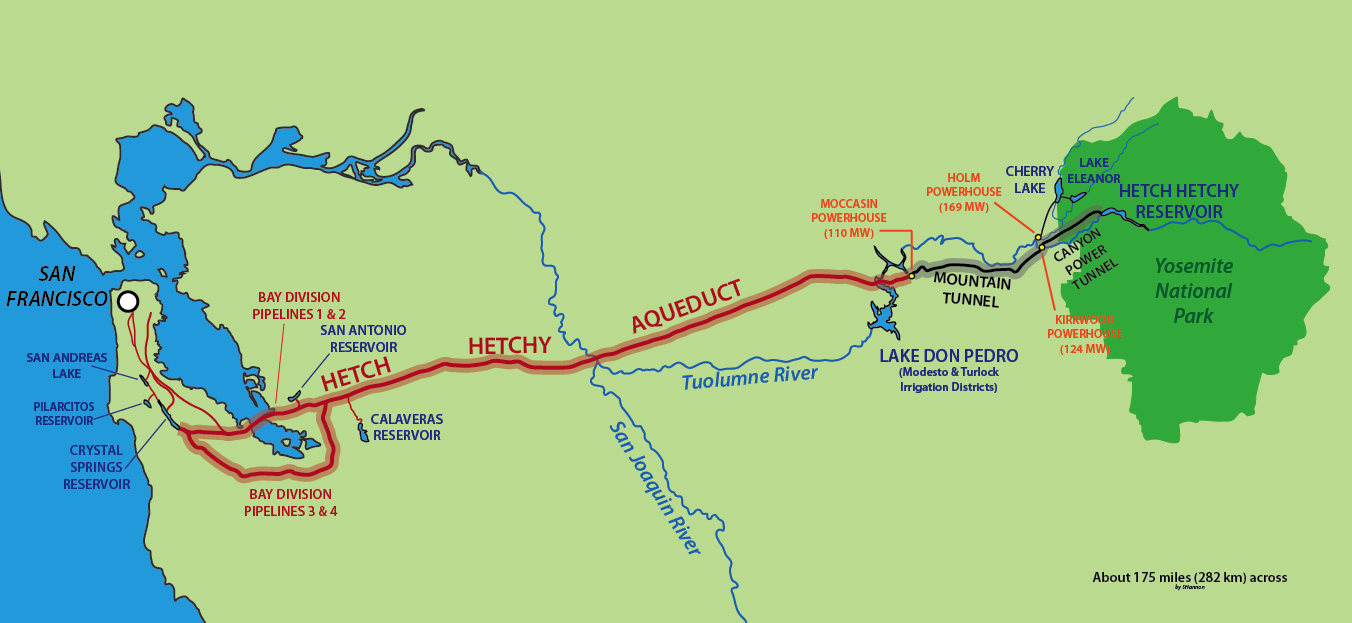
Contemporary map of the Hetch Hetchy Aqueduct system

Prior to completion of the Hetch Hetchy Aqueduct in 1934, half of San Francisco's water supply, approximately 6 million gallons per day passed through the Sunol temple. The SVWC, including the temple, was purchased by the city of San Francisco in 1930 for US$40 million.

In 1932, a new city charter was adopted which established the San Francisco Public Utilities Commission. At the time of its formation, the commission was responsible for the Hetch Hetchy Project, San Francisco Municipal Railway, Water Department, and Airport. The Airport was later transferred out of the SFPUC to the newly formed Airport Commission in 1971. Similarly, in 1994 the Municipal Railway was moved out to the separate Public Transportation Commission.

== Structure and leadership ==
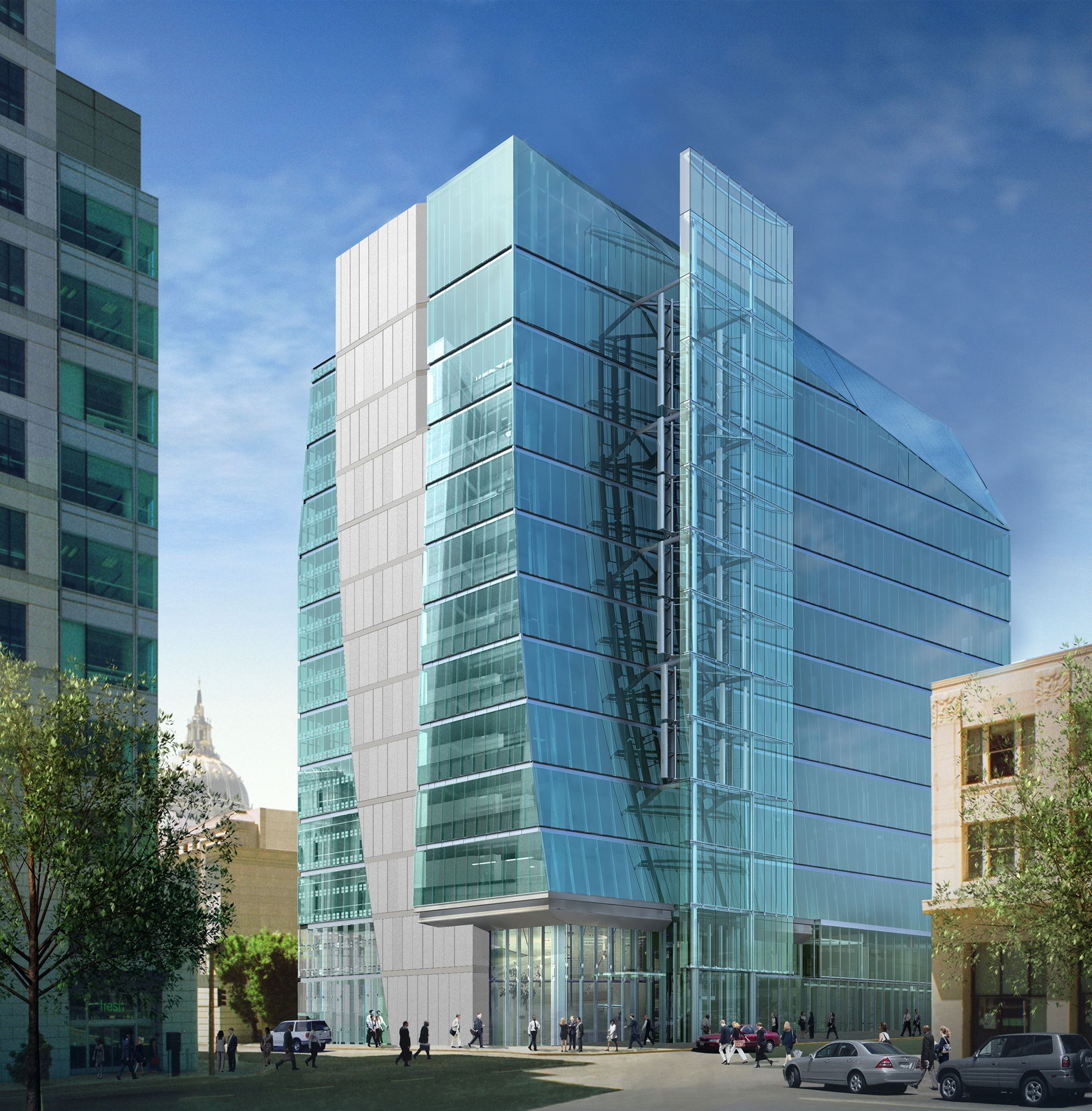
Artist's rendering of the SFPUC headquarters in Civic Center

The SFPUC is headed by a board consisting of five Commissioners, who are nominated by the Mayor of San Francisco and confirmed by the San Francisco Board of Supervisors. Each of the five Commissioners is chosen according to criteria set forth in the San Francisco City Charter:

Seat 1 on the Commission shall be a member with experience in environmental policy and an understanding of environmental justice issues. Seat 2 shall be a member with experience in ratepayer or consumer advocacy. Seat 3 shall be a member with experience in project finance. Seat 4 shall be a member with expertise in water systems, power systems, or public utility management, and Seat 5 shall be an at-large member.

The Commission meets on the second and fourth Tuesdays of each month. Their responsibility is to provide operational oversight in such areas as rates and charges for services, approval of contracts, and organizational policy.

The board appoints a General Manager as the chief executive of the SFPUC, with each division headed by an Assistant General Manager (AGM). The six divisions are: Business Services, External Affairs, Infrastructure, Power Enterprise, Water Enterprise, and Wastewater Enterprise.

== Controversy ==
Then-SFPUC director Harlan Kelly resigned on November 30, 2020, charged with accepting bribes from a contractor. Kelly's trial began in June 2023. Kelly was convicted in July 2023 of felony bribery and bank fraud and sentenced to four years in prison.

== Environmental sustainability ==
With the goal of improving sustainability and the city of San Francisco's goal to become a "zero emission city" by 2030, the SFPUC is implementing a number of projects in all of its core businesses: water, power and sewer.

- Water: SFPUC is applying a "Water System Improvement Program" (WSIP) to manage a wide range of projects focusing on the optimization of pipelines, pump stations and water tanks usage.
- Power: SFPUC is generating and providing different typologies of clean energy (hydroelectric, solar and biogas) for municipal services and citizens needs. Moreover, in collaboration with Paradox Engineering is seeking to exploit street light pole developing an integrated infrastructure with the specific scope of monitor the usage of urban services, optimize the power consumption and consequently reduce waste.
- Sewer: SFPUC is applying the "Sewer System Improvement Program" (SSIP) to manage a wide range of projects that includes optimization of pump stations and wastewater treatment processes. In addition, SFPUC has applied over $50M of funding to pilot and are constructing various Low Impact Designs (LID) through their "Early Implementation Projects" to test if LID features such as bio-retention systems or creek daylighting projects would reduce the volume of stormwater that would be collected, conveyed and treated. By reducing the stormwater flows to the wastewater treatment plants, energy consumption may be reduced. SFPUC is equally committed to environmental justice causes and will address sewage flooding at many flood-prone neighborhoods in San Francisco: (1) Cayuga Avenue, (2) Alemany Circle, (3) Folsom and 17th Streets, (4) Toland Street, (5) Foerster Street, (6) Urbano Dr and Victoria Street, (7) Wawona Ave and 15th Ave. The low-lying areas of San Francisco along the San Francisco Bay is vulnerable to periodic flooding from runoff and wastewater during winter storms. Continued land subsidence, sea level rise, and urban growth in hitherto industrial neighborhoods will continue to challenge the runoff and sewage collection and conveyance system.

== See also ==
- Hetch Hetchy
- Sunol Water Temple - an unusual structure owned by the SFPUC
- Pulgas Water Temple - an inoperative structure similar to the Sunol Water Temple
- Crystal Springs Park, California
- Dutch Windmill (Golden Gate Park)
- Murphy Windmill
- Charles N. Fox
- Michael O'Shaughnessy
- Hermann Schussler
- Lloyd Tevis
- Antoine Borel
- Ethel Grace Lynn
