= Northern California District Council of Laborers =

- Laborers' International Union of North America
- Founded: April 13, 1903
- Members: 30,000
- Key people: Oscar De La Torre, Business Manager
- Affiliations: Laborers' International Union of North America
- Website: www.ncdc-laborers.org

The Northern California District Council of Laborers (NCDCL) is a labor organization affiliated with the Laborers' International Union of North America. The NCDCL was chartered in 1937 in San Francisco, California and today represents over 30,000 men and women, who are collectively employed as laborers by its network of 1700 signatory employers.

== About ==
The purpose of the NCDCL is to raise the living standards of its members. With that responsibility, the Council obligates itself to its members. The NCDCL does not limit their efforts to simple representation, they take a long-term view of their members and successive generations and annually award college scholarships to members or their families

The construction industry differs in that bargaining units are not organized by the workers who then form a shop through elections. The construction company management chooses to be a union shop because they value the benefits and services they receive and in exchange they agree to hire members of that union. To further achieve the goal of raising member living standards through jobs, the NCDCL must gain signatory employers. The obligation to provide a service to employers is a shared obligation hand-in-hand with the NCDCL's primary goal of obtaining their members a dignified and sustainable standard of living. The NCDCL's goal - like all labor unions - is a wage that provides that the children of members can obtain as good or better of a standard of living as their parents.

The NCDCL provides valuable services to their signatory employers by providing work opportunities through political action, job tracking, advanced training and re-training, competitive wage rates, prevailing wage cost savings benefit, workers’ compensation alternative dispute resolution, marketing, health and safety, and legislative advocacy.

== NCDCL Board of Directors ==
The NCDCL is collectively governed by its board of directors. Members of the board are elected by the NCDCL Delegates and serve for four-year terms. As of 2019, the board of directors is composed of the following elected officials:

- Business manager: Oscar De La Torre
- President: David Thomas
- Vice president: Victor Parra
- Secretary-treasurer: Fernando Estrada
- Executive board: Enrique Arguello, Ramon Hernandez, James Hammond
- Sergeant at arms: Joshua Lepper
- Auditors: Doyle S. Radford, Jr., Keith LeMoine, Carlos Bedolla

== Leadership ==
Oscar De La Torre is the business manager of the NCDCL. Prior to his election to the District Council, De La Torre was the business manager/secretary-treasurer for Laborers’ International Union Local No. 261. Under De La Torre, Local Union No. 261 increased and diversified its membership and currently serves over 3,200 men and women working in both private and public labor sectors.

De La Torre is a third-generation laborer and has dedicated his entire career to the advancement of the Labor Movement. De La Torre’s mission is to advance the fundamental rights of workers by bettering salaries, health care coverage, pension, and retirement options.

De La Torre is co-chairman of the Northern California Health & Welfare, Northern California Pension Funds, Northern California Training & Retraining Fund and Northern California Apprenticeship Training Committee.

De La Torre is dedicated to the community and has built strong coalitions with non-profit community groups. He currently sits on the California Labor Federation, Mission Housing Development Corporation, San Francisco Planning and Urban Research Association (SPUR) and Instituto Laboral De La Raza.

In 2010, De La Torre was appointed vice president at large of the Laborers International Union of North America (LIUNA). Under the leadership of LIUNA General President Brent Booker and LIUNA General Secretary/Treasurer, Michael Sabitoni, De La Torre serves with 13 other LIUNA Vice Presidents who make up the LIUNA General Executive Board. The General Executive Board is charged with implementing policy and direction for the 9 Regional Offices, 46 District Councils and 475 Local Unions that comprise LIUNA’s North America operations.

== Affiliated local unions ==
The affiliated local unions in Northern California are as follows:

Local union	Address	Business Manager
Laborers' Local 67	8400 Enterprise Way, Room 19, Oakland, CA 94621	Victor Parra
Laborers' Local 73	3984 Cherokee Road, Stockton, CA 95215	Carlos Bodilla, Jr.
Laborers' Local 185	1320 National Drive, Sacramento, CA 95834	Doyle S. Radford, Jr.
Laborers' Local 261	3271 – 18th Street, San Francisco, CA 94110	Ramon Hernandez
Laborers' Local 270	509 Emory Street, San Jose, CA 95110	Enrique Arguello
Laborers' Local 294	5431 East Hedges, Fresno, CA 93727	James Hammond
Laborers' Local 304	29475 Mission Blvd, Hayward, CA 94544-6118	Fernando Estrada
Laborers' Local 324	611 Berrellesa Street, Martinez, CA 94553	Keith LeMoine
Laborers' Local 1130	2549 Yosemite Blvd., Ste K, Modesto, CA 95354	Joshua Lepper

Through these affiliated locals the NCDCL covers the following counties in Northern California: Alameda, Alpine, Amador, Butte, Calaveras, Colusa, Contra Costa, Del Norte, El Dorado, Fresno, Glenn, Humboldt, Kings, Lake, Lassen, Madera, Marin, Mariposa, Mendocino, Merced, Modoc, Monterey, Napa, Nevada, Placer, Plumas, Sacramento, San Benito, San Francisco, San Joaquin, San Mateo, Santa Clara, Santa Cruz, Shasta, Sierra, Siskiyou, Solano, Sonoma, Stanislaus, Sutter, Tehama, Trinity, Tulare, Tuolumne, Yolo and Yuba.
