= March 2004 San Francisco general election =

The March 2004 San Francisco general elections were held on March 2, 2004, in San Francisco, California. The elections included seats to various political parties' county central committees and ten ballot measures.

More than 70% of voters supported Proposition H to increase funding for the city's schools.

== Propositions ==
Note: "City" refers to the San Francisco municipal government.

=== Proposition A ===

Proposition A would allow City employees who receive cash payments for unused vacation time and sick leave to defer the payment and any federal and state taxes associated with said payment.

Proposition A
| Choice | Votes | % |
|---|---|---|
| For | 107,690 | 62.38 |
| Against | 64,943 | 37.62 |
| Total | 172,633 | 100.00 |
| Valid votes | 172,633 | 90.47 |
| Invalid/blank votes | 18,195 | 9.53 |
| Total votes | 190,828 | 100.00 |
| Registered voters/turnout | | 42.51 |

=== Proposition B ===

Proposition B would contract out retirement benefits of district attorneys, public defenders, and public defender investigators to the California Public Employee Retirement System (CalPERS) if there is no additional cost to the city.

Proposition B
| Choice | Votes | % |
|---|---|---|
| For | 114,209 | 67.73 |
| Against | 54,418 | 32.27 |
| Total | 168,627 | 100.00 |
| Valid votes | 168,627 | 88.37 |
| Invalid/blank votes | 22,201 | 11.63 |
| Total votes | 190,828 | 100.00 |
| Registered voters/turnout | | 42.51 |

=== Proposition C ===

Proposition C would reduce the number of required uniform officers by the number of Police Department positions currently staffed by uniformed officers that would be replaced by civilian staff.

Proposition C
| Choice | Votes | % |
|---|---|---|
| For | 105,005 | 61.85 |
| Against | 64,773 | 38.15 |
| Total | 169,778 | 100.00 |
| Valid votes | 169,778 | 88.97 |
| Invalid/blank votes | 21,050 | 11.03 |
| Total votes | 190,828 | 100.00 |
| Registered voters/turnout | | 42.51 |

=== Proposition D ===

Proposition D would allow domestic partners to register in the city and have the City Employees' Retirement System to treat domestic partners as spouses.

Proposition D
| Choice | Votes | % |
|---|---|---|
| For | 113,646 | 65.07 |
| Against | 60,999 | 34.93 |
| Total | 174,645 | 100.00 |
| Valid votes | 174,645 | 91.52 |
| Invalid/blank votes | 16,183 | 8.48 |
| Total votes | 190,828 | 100.00 |
| Registered voters/turnout | | 42.51 |

=== Proposition E ===

Proposition E would have the San Francisco Board of Supervisors respond to any federal or state requests potentially involving private information on citizens instead of individual officials and departments.

Proposition E
| Choice | Votes | % |
|---|---|---|
| For | 87,704 | 52.22 |
| Against | 80,236 | 47.78 |
| Total | 167,940 | 100.00 |
| Valid votes | 167,940 | 88.01 |
| Invalid/blank votes | 22,888 | 11.99 |
| Total votes | 190,828 | 100.00 |
| Registered voters/turnout | | 42.51 |

=== Proposition F ===

Proposition F would apply labor negotiation rules regarding police officers and fire departments on labor negotiations regarding deputy sheriffs.

Proposition F
| Choice | Votes | % |
|---|---|---|
| For | 103,327 | 63.16 |
| Against | 60,267 | 36.84 |
| Total | 163,594 | 100.00 |
| Valid votes | 163,594 | 85.73 |
| Invalid/blank votes | 27,234 | 14.27 |
| Total votes | 190,828 | 100.00 |
| Registered voters/turnout | | 42.51 |

=== Proposition G ===

Proposition G would allow the Mayor and Board of Supervisors to decide to provide supplemental pay over 180 days to City employees called for military service.

Proposition G
| Choice | Votes | % |
|---|---|---|
| For | 99,726 | 58.90 |
| Against | 69,589 | 41.10 |
| Total | 169,315 | 100.00 |
| Valid votes | 169,315 | 88.73 |
| Invalid/blank votes | 21,513 | 11.27 |
| Total votes | 190,828 | 100.00 |
| Registered voters/turnout | | 42.51 |

=== Proposition H ===

Proposition H would create a Public Education Fund to increase City spending on public education over the next eleven years.

Proposition H
| Choice | Votes | % |
|---|---|---|
| For | 123,103 | 70.77 |
| Against | 50,837 | 29.23 |
| Total | 173,940 | 100.00 |
| Valid votes | 173,940 | 91.15 |
| Invalid/blank votes | 16,888 | 8.85 |
| Total votes | 190,828 | 100.00 |
| Registered voters/turnout | | 42.51 |

=== Proposition I ===

Proposition I would require Muni to replace all diesel buses purchased before 1991 and require new buses to meet anti-pollution standards that apply to other City vehicles.

Proposition I
| Choice | Votes | % |
|---|---|---|
| For | 118,074 | 67.49 |
| Against | 56,864 | 32.51 |
| Total | 174,938 | 100.00 |
| Valid votes | 174,938 | 91.67 |
| Invalid/blank votes | 15,890 | 8.33 |
| Total votes | 190,828 | 100.00 |
| Registered voters/turnout | | 42.51 |

=== Proposition J ===

Proposition J would allow developers building in downtown or along the central waterfront to be subject to less restrictions regarding height and density provided they build and sell more below-market rate housing.

Proposition J
| Choice | Votes | % |
|---|---|---|
| For | 52,028 | 30.01 |
| Against | 121,352 | 69.99 |
| Total | 173,380 | 100.00 |
| Valid votes | 173,380 | 90.86 |
| Invalid/blank votes | 17,448 | 9.14 |
| Total votes | 190,828 | 100.00 |
| Registered voters/turnout | | 42.51 |
