= Jefftowne =

1997 film directed by Daniel Kraus

- DVD cover
- Directed by: Daniel Kraus
- Cinematography: Daniel Kraus
- Edited by: Daniel Kraus
- Distributed by: Troma Entertainment
- Release date: September 8, 1997 (Iowa City)
- Running time: 59 minutes
- Country: United States
- Language: English

Jefftowne is a 1997 American documentary film shot, directed and edited by Daniel Kraus, and distributed by Troma Entertainment. It chronicles the life of Jeff Towne, a 40-year-old Iowa City resident who has Down syndrome, obesity, alcoholism, and circulation problems. The film opened at the Bijou Theater in Iowa City on September 8, 1997, and later screened at the Chicago Underground Film Festival in 1998.

== Production ==
Kraus began shooting footage for Jefftowne in 1996.

Towne died May 4, 2018, at the University of Iowa Hospitals and Clinics at age 59.

== Reception ==
Reception at the time of release is reported to have been mixed. A review of the DVD version for Horror Society, however, stated that the film was not a typical Troma production but added, "Fans of unusual cinema and strange documentaries need to check this one out. "
