= Ritual Coffee Roasters =

Californian coffee roaster

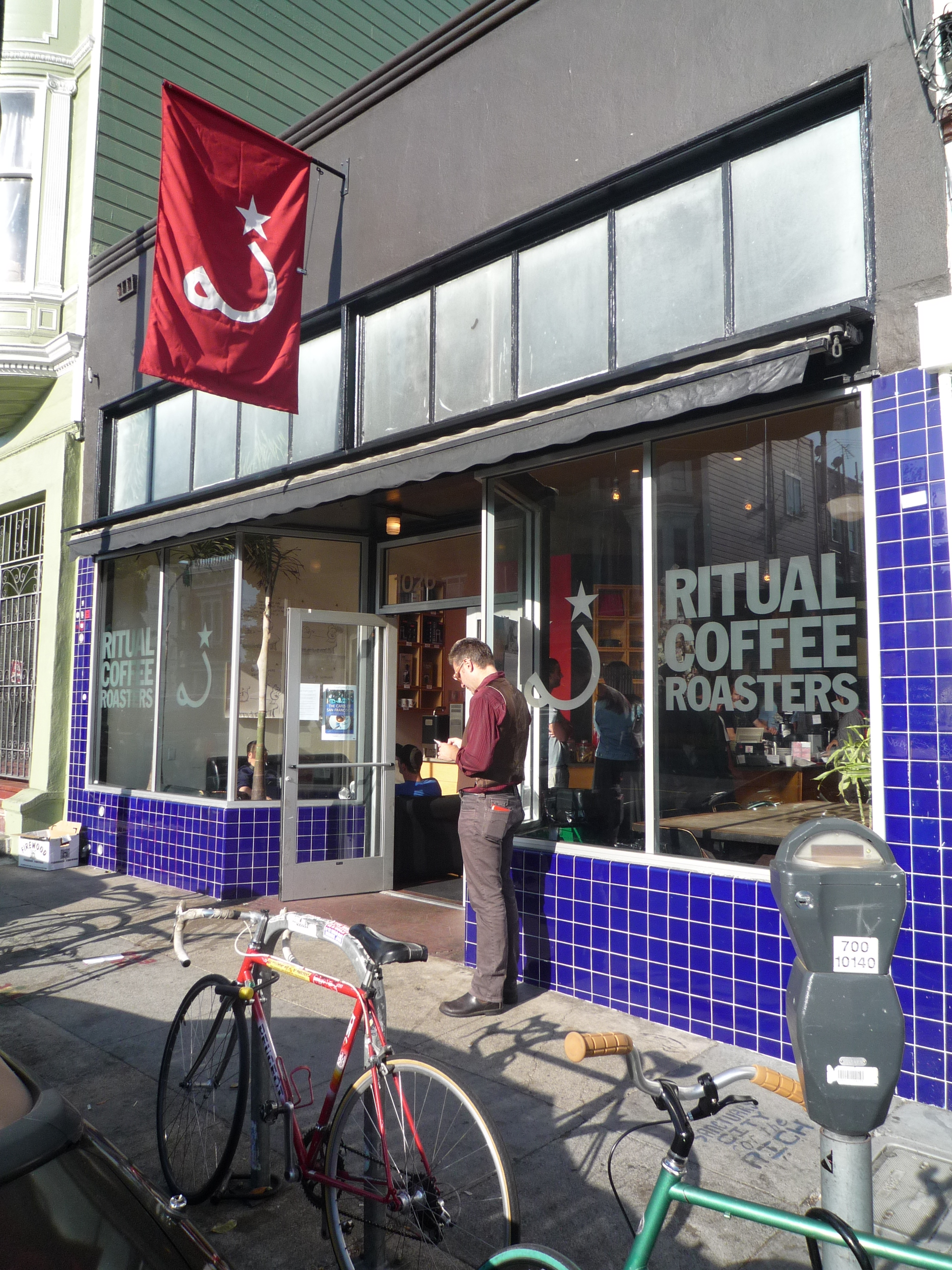
- Ritual's Mission location
- Founded: 2005 in San Francisco, California
- Founder: Eileen Hassi Rinaldi
- Headquarters: San Francisco, California, U.S.
- Number of locations: 6 (2019)
- Area served: United States

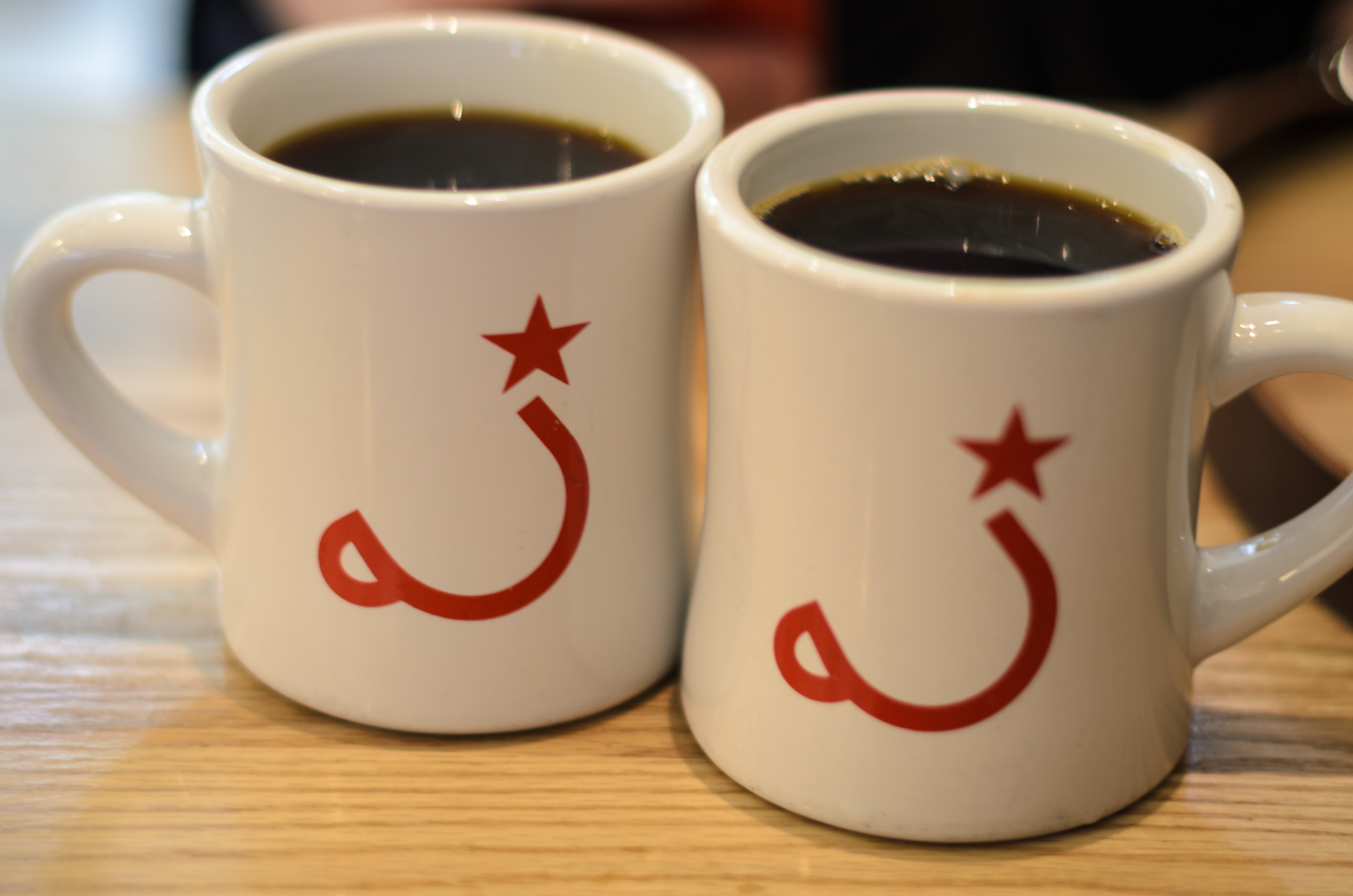
Ritual Coffee

Ritual Coffee Roasters is a coffee roaster based in San Francisco, California, with six cafes in San Francisco and Napa. Founded in 2005, Ritual Roasters is considered part of the "third wave of coffee" independent companies which both roast their own beans, wholesale, and operate cafes. Their peers include Blue Bottle Coffee Company and Four Barrel Coffee, among others. In March 2017, Somatik partnered with Ritual Coffee to make $12 marijuana-infused cold brew.

In 2021, the Haight Street location of Ritual Coffee Roasters was damaged during a shooting in the area, when the café was struck by gunfire. The incident was cited in later reporting as one of several challenges affecting the operation of the location. In March 2025, the company announced the closure of its Haight Street café, ending a nine-year presence in the neighbourhood, with the location scheduled to close on April 11.

They have a line of canned coffee, partnered with Juanita More.

== See also ==
- List of coffeehouse chains
