= November 2008 San Francisco general election =

The November 2008 San Francisco general elections were held on November 4, 2008, in San Francisco, California. The elections included seven seats to the San Francisco Board of Supervisors, one seat to the San Francisco County Superior Court, and twenty-two San Francisco ballot measures.

== Superior Court ==

San Francisco County Superior Court Seat 12 election
Candidate	Votes	%
Gerardo Sandoval	156,227	53.50
Thomas Mellon (incumbent)	134,339	46.00
Write-in	1,449	0.50
Invalid or blank votes	96,097	24.76
Total votes	388,112	100.00
Turnout	{{{votes}}}	81.25%

== Propositions ==
Note: "City" refers to the San Francisco municipal government.

=== Proposition A ===

Proposition A would authorize the city to issue $887.4 million in bonds to rebuild and improve San Francisco General Hospital. This proposition required a two-thirds majority to pass.

Proposition A
Choice	Votes	%
For	300,595	83.81
Against	58,049	16.19
Required majority		66.67
Total	358,644	100.00
Valid votes	358,644	94.01
Invalid/blank votes	22,851	5.99
Total votes	381,495	100.00
Registered voters/turnout		81.25

=== Proposition B ===

Proposition B would establish an Affordable Housing Fund to acquire new affordable housing, funded by setting aside a portion of property taxes.

Proposition B
Choice	Votes	%
For	166,299	47.81
Against	181,534	52.19
Total	347,833	100.00
Valid votes	347,833	91.18
Invalid/blank votes	33,662	8.82
Total votes	381,495	100.00
Registered voters/turnout		81.25

=== Proposition C ===

Proposition C would prohibit City employees from serving on most Charter-created boards and commissions.

Proposition C
Choice	Votes	%
For	124,395	38.06
Against	202,419	61.94
Total	326,814	100.00
Valid votes	326,814	85.67
Invalid/blank votes	54,681	14.33
Total votes	381,495	100.00
Registered voters/turnout		81.25

=== Proposition D ===

Proposition D would allocate funds from new hotel and payroll expense tax revenues toward developing Pier 70, on the Central Waterfront, if a financial and land use plan is approved by the San Francisco Board of Supervisors.

Proposition D
Choice	Votes	%
For	226,513	68.07
Against	106,228	31.93
Total	332,741	100.00
Valid votes	332,741	87.22
Invalid/blank votes	48,754	12.78
Total votes	381,495	100.00
Registered voters/turnout		81.25

=== Proposition E ===

Proposition E would change the number of signatures needed to recall city officials from a fixed 10% of registered voters to a scale of from 10% to 15% based on population.

Proposition E
Choice	Votes	%
For	195,605	60.10
Against	129,862	39.90
Total	325,467	100.00
Valid votes	325,467	85.31
Invalid/blank votes	56,028	14.69
Total votes	381,495	100.00
Registered voters/turnout		81.25

=== Proposition F ===

Proposition F would shift City elections of some citywide offices from odd-numbered years to even-numbered years after November 2011.

Proposition F
Choice	Votes	%
For	144,592	45.00
Against	176,692	55.00
Total	321,284	100.00
Valid votes	321,284	84.22
Invalid/blank votes	60,211	15.78
Total votes	381,495	100.00
Registered voters/turnout		81.25

=== Proposition G ===

Proposition G would "allow City employees to purchase retirement system credit for unpaid parental leave taken before July 1, 2003, as long as the purchase price covers all city costs."

Proposition G
Choice	Votes	%
For	202,011	62.47
Against	121,354	37.53
Total	323,365	100.00
Valid votes	323,365	84.76
Invalid/blank votes	58,130	15.24
Total votes	381,495	100.00
Registered voters/turnout		81.25

=== Proposition H ===

Proposition H would establish public power in San Francisco, allowing the city to purchase public utilities, establishing deadlines on alternative energy use, allowing the City Public Utilities Commission to set rates, and allowing the Board of Supervisors to issue public utility bonds without voter approval.

Proposition H
Choice	Votes	%
For	133,214	38.62
Against	211,681	61.38
Total	344,895	100.00
Valid votes	344,895	90.41
Invalid/blank votes	36,600	9.59
Total votes	381,495	100.00
Registered voters/turnout		81.25

=== Proposition I ===

Proposition I would create the Office of Independent Ratepayer Advocate to recommend public utility rates to the City Public Utilities Commission.

Proposition I
Choice	Votes	%
For	117,050	36.71
Against	201,811	63.29
Total	318,861	100.00
Valid votes	318,861	83.58
Invalid/blank votes	62,634	16.42
Total votes	381,495	100.00
Registered voters/turnout		81.25

=== Proposition J ===

Proposition J would create a Historic Preservation Commission and allow it to make decisions regarding historic preservation in the city.

Proposition J
Choice	Votes	%
For	183,372	55.64
Against	146,194	44.36
Total	329,566	100.00
Valid votes	329,566	86.39
Invalid/blank votes	51,929	13.61
Total votes	381,495	100.00
Registered voters/turnout		81.25

=== Proposition K ===

Proposition K would decriminalize prostitution, enforce laws against crimes on sex workers, and disclose all investigations and prosecutions of violent crimes against sex workers.

Proposition K
Choice	Votes	%
For	140,185	40.94
Against	202,235	59.06
Total	342,420	100.00
Valid votes	342,420	89.76
Invalid/blank votes	39,075	10.24
Total votes	381,495	100.00
Registered voters/turnout		81.25

=== Proposition L ===

Proposition L would ensure first-year funding, furnish leased space, and define the scope and operations of the Community Justice Center.

Proposition L
Choice	Votes	%
For	132,097	42.54
Against	178,440	57.46
Total	310,537	100.00
Valid votes	310,537	81.40
Invalid/blank votes	70,958	18.60
Total votes	381,495	100.00
Registered voters/turnout		81.25

=== Proposition M ===

Proposition M would prohibit landlords from engaging in specific acts of tenant harassment and allow such enforcement by court orders, rent reduction, monetary awards, and criminal penalties.

Proposition M
Choice	Votes	%
For	195,023	58.84
Against	136,416	41.16
Total	331,439	100.00
Valid votes	331,439	86.88
Invalid/blank votes	50,056	13.12
Total votes	381,495	100.00
Registered voters/turnout		81.25

=== Proposition N ===

Proposition N would increase the transfer tax on properties worth $5 million or up to 1.5% and reduce the tax on residences that install solar energy systems or make seismic upgrades.

Proposition N
Choice	Votes	%
For	223,808	68.56
Against	102,621	31.44
Total	326,429	100.00
Valid votes	326,429	85.57
Invalid/blank votes	55,066	14.43
Total votes	381,495	100.00
Registered voters/turnout		81.25

=== Proposition O ===

Proposition O would replace the Emergency Response Fee with a functionally equivalent Access Line Tax and revise the Telephone Users Tax.

Proposition O
Choice	Votes	%
For	208,044	66.74
Against	103,679	33.26
Total	311,723	100.00
Valid votes	311,723	81.71
Invalid/blank votes	69,772	18.29
Total votes	381,495	100.00
Registered voters/turnout		81.25

=== Proposition P ===

Proposition P would change the size and composition of the San Francisco Transportation Authority Board from the entire Board of Supervisors to one consisting of the Mayor, the President of the Board of Supervisors, an elected City official selected by the Mayor, an elected City official selected by the President of the Board of Supervisors, and the Treasurer, and encourage the Authority to obtain expert financial review of its budgets and adopt City ethics and public records laws.

Proposition P
Choice	Votes	%
For	101,230	32.99
Against	205,665	67.01
Total	306,895	100.00
Valid votes	306,895	80.45
Invalid/blank votes	74,600	19.55
Total votes	381,495	100.00
Registered voters/turnout		81.25

=== Proposition Q ===

Proposition Q would include more partnerships and businesses to be subject under the payroll expense tax and expand the tax exemption to businesses that have annual payroll expenses of $250,000 or less.

Proposition Q
Choice	Votes	%
For	233,411	74.20
Against	81,178	25.80
Total	314,589	100.00
Valid votes	314,589	82.46
Invalid/blank votes	66,906	17.54
Total votes	381,495	100.00
Registered voters/turnout		81.25

=== Proposition R ===

Proposition R would rename the Oceanside Water Pollution Control Plant to the George W. Bush Sewage Plant.

Proposition R
Choice	Votes	%
For	101,376	30.25
Against	233,733	69.75
Total	335,109	100.00
Valid votes	335,109	87.84
Invalid/blank votes	46,386	12.16
Total votes	381,495	100.00
Registered voters/turnout		81.25

=== Proposition S ===

Proposition S would make it City policy that voters will not approve new set-asides of City revenue that do not identify a new funding source, limit annual increases, and expire in ten years.

Proposition S
Choice	Votes	%
For	167,974	55.66
Against	133,817	44.34
Total	301,791	100.00
Valid votes	301,791	79.11
Invalid/blank votes	79,704	20.89
Total votes	381,495	100.00
Registered voters/turnout		81.25

=== Proposition T ===

Proposition T would mandate the city to maintain funding for and provide enough free and low-cost substance abuse treatment services to meet demand.

Proposition T
Choice	Votes	%
For	200,649	61.24
Against	127,014	38.76
Total	327,663	100.00
Valid votes	327,663	85.89
Invalid/blank votes	53,832	14.11
Total votes	381,495	100.00
Registered voters/turnout		81.25

=== Proposition U ===

Proposition U would make it City policy that representatives and senators in the United States Congress vote against further funding for deploying troops to Iraq, except for funds to withdraw such troops.

Proposition U
Choice	Votes	%
For	193,407	59.25
Against	133,002	40.75
Total	326,409	100.00
Valid votes	326,409	85.56
Invalid/blank votes	55,086	14.44
Total votes	381,495	100.00
Registered voters/turnout		81.25

=== Proposition V ===

Proposition V would make it City policy to urge the San Francisco Board of Education to reverse its elimination of the Junior Reserve Officers' Training Corps (JROTC).

Proposition V
Choice	Votes	%
For	179,639	54.63
Against	149,169	45.37
Total	328,808	100.00
Valid votes	328,808	86.19
Invalid/blank votes	52,687	13.81
Total votes	381,495	100.00
Registered voters/turnout		81.25
