= GG Allin discography =

This is a list of albums, singles, and extended plays by American punk rock musician GG Allin.

== Albums ==
=== Studio albums ===
==== as GG Allin ====
Year	Title	Label	Format
1980	Always Was, Is and Always Shall Be	Orange	LP
1988	Freaks, Faggots, Drunks and Junkies	Homestead	LP
1989	The Suicide Sessions	Homestead	Cassette

==== as GG Allin & The Scumfucs ====
Year	Title	Label	Format
1984	Eat My Fuc	Blood	LP
1985	You'll Never Tame Me	None	Cassette

==== as GG Allin & The Holy Men ====
Year	Title	Label	Format
1987	You Give Love a Bad Name	Homestead	LP

==== as GG Allin & The Bleeding Cunt Seekers ====
Year	Title	Label	Format
1990	Beautiful Afterbirth: Fucked & Framed	Jehovas Shitlist	7"

==== as GG Allin & Antiseen ====
Year	Title	Label	Format
1991	Murder Junkies	New Rose; TKO	CD

==== as GG Allin & The Murder Junkies ====
Year	Title	Label	Format
1993	Brutality and Bloodshed for All	Alive	LP

==== as GG Allin & The Criminal Quartet ====
Year	Title	Label	Format
1995	Carnival of Excess	Vinyl Retentive	CD
2016	Carnival of Excess: Limited Edition	Ponk Media	CD

=== Live albums ===
==== as GG Allin ====
Year	Title	Label	Format
1987	Bored Again	None	Cassette
1990	Anti-Social Personality Disorder - Live	Ever Rat	Cassette

==== as GG Allin & The Jabbers ====
Year	Title	Label	Format
1981	Band in Boston	None	Cassette
1982	Tasteless Animal Noise	None	Cassette
1982	Bored Again	None	Cassette
1983	Live at the A7 Club	None	Cassette

==== as GG Allin & The Texas Nazis ====
Year	Title	Label	Format
1985	Boozing and Pranks	None	Cassette

==== as GG Allin & The Murder Junkies ====
Year	Title	Label	Format
1996	Terror in America	Alive	CD

=== Compilation albums ===
==== as GG Allin ====
Year	Title	Label	Format
1983	Win Some Lose Some	Orange	Cassette
1985	Sing Along Love Songs	Bad Luck	Cassette
1987	Dirty Love Songs	New Rose	2xLP
1987	Hated in the Nation	ROIR	Cassette
1990	Doctrine of Mayhem	Black & Blue	LP
1993	The Bloody Years	Black & Blue	CD
1996	The Troubled Troubadour	Mountain	CD

==== as GG Allin & The Jabbers ====
Year	Title	Label	Format
1989	Banned in Boston	Black & Blue	CD

== Extended plays ==
=== as GG Allin ===
Year	Title	Label	Format
1982	You Hate Me & I Hate You	Orange	7"
1982	No Rules	Orange	7"
1984	Live Fast Die Fast	Black & Blue	7"
1988	Expose Yourself to Kids	Homestead	7"
1990	The Troubled Troubador	Mountain	7"
1990	Outside Inside	Bitter Boy	7"
1990	Live... Carolina in My Ass	REPO	7"
1991	Bleedin', Stinkin' & Drinkin'	Vinyl Retentive	Cassette
1992	I Am the Highest Power	Beast 666	Cassette
1993	Up Against the Wall	Flying Turd	7"
1993	Sickest of the Sick	Occult	10"
1995	The Masturbation Session	Alive	10"

=== as GG Allin & The Jabbers ===
Year	Title	Label	Format
1979	Bored to Death	Blood	7"
1982	Public Animal #1		7"

=== as GG Allin & The Scumfucs ===
Year	Title	Label	Format
1983	GG Allin + The Scumfucs	Blood	7"
1985	I Wanna Fuck Your Brains Out	Blood	7"

=== as GG Allin & The Cedar St. Sluts ===
Year	Title	Label	Format
1986	The Sleaziest, Loosest Sluts	None	Cassette

=== as GG Allin & Bulge ===
Year	Title	Label	Format
1991	Legalize Murder	Fudgeworthy	7"

=== as GG Allin & The Murder Junkies ===
Year	Title	Label	Format
1991	GG Allin & The Murder Junkies	Fuckin' A Stomach Ache	7"

==== as GG Allin & Shrinkwrap ====
Year	Title	Label	Format
1993	War in My Head - I'm Your Enemy	Awareness	CD

=== as GG Allin & The Carolina Shitkickers ===
Year	Title	Label	Format
1993	Layin' Up With Linda	TPOS	7"

== Singles ==
=== as GG Allin ===
Year	Title (A-side/B-side)	Label	Format
1981	"Gimme Some Head" "Dead or Alive"	Orange	7"
1988	"GG Allin's Xmas Song" "Santa Is Dead!"	Black & Blue	7"
1993	"No Room" "Kiss Me in the Gutter"	Fuckin' A	7"

=== as GG Allin & The Jabbers ===
Year	Title (A-side/B-side)	Label	Format
1980	"1980's Rock 'n' Roll" "Cheri Love Affair"	Destiny	7"

=== as GG Allin & Antiseen ===
Year	Title (A-side/B-side)	Label	Format
1993	"Violence Now (Assassinate the President)" "Cock on the Loose"	Jettison	7"

=== as GG Allin & The Criminal Quartet ===
Year	Title (A-side/B-side)	Label	Format
1993	"Son of Evil" "Fuck Authority"	Vinyl Retentive	7"

=== as GG Allin & The Murder Junkies ===
Year	Title (A-side/B-side)	Label	Format
1993	"Kill Thy Father, Rape Thy Mother" "Take Aim and Fire"	Sympathy for the Record Industry	7"

=== as GG Allin & The Southern Baptists ===
Year	Title (A-side/B-side)	Label	Format
1993	"Look Into My Eyes and Hate Me" "Hotel Clermont"	Railroad	7"
