= The Murder Junkies =

American punk rock band

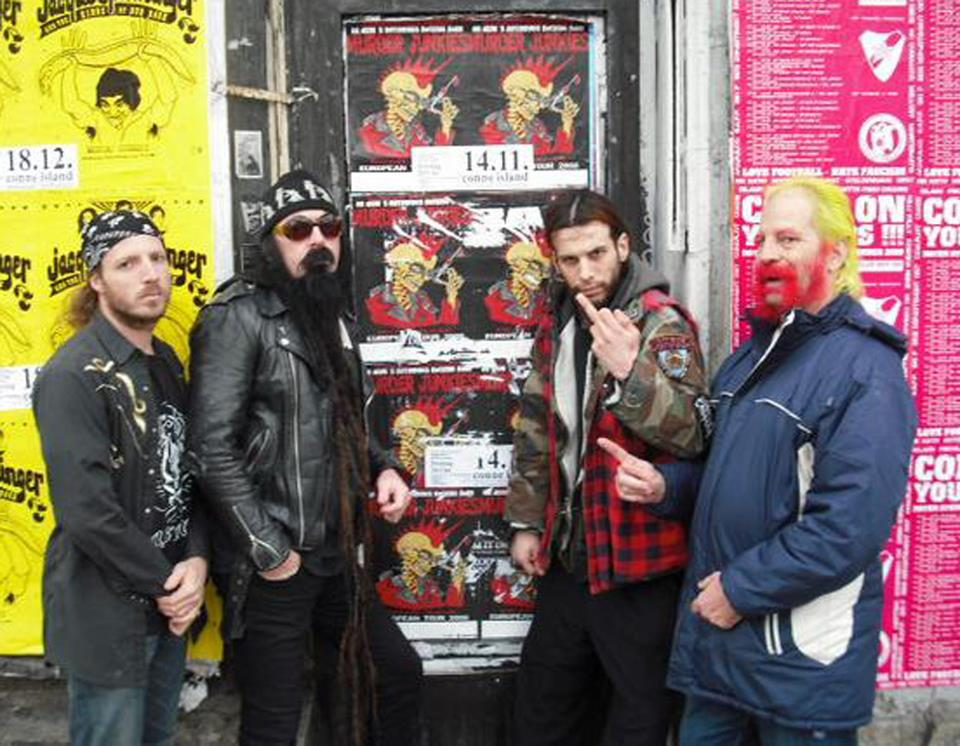
- Murder Junkies in 2008

Background information
- Origin: New York City, U.S.
- Genres: Hardcore punk; punk rock
- Years active: 1990–1999; 2003–present
- Members: Merle Allin; Dino Sex; Duane Rollick; Brandon Fergus
- Past members: GG Allin; Chicken John; William Weber; Dee Dee Ramone; Mike Denied; Sonny Harlan; Mike Hudson; Jeff Clayton; J. B. Beverley; Scotty Wood; Benjamin "FC Murder" Bunny; Harold "PP Duvay" Rogers

The Murder Junkies are an American punk rock band, best known for having been GG Allin's final backing band before his death. They perform songs from Allin's back catalog as well as their own original material. They are the third GG Allin backing band to bear the name.

== Earlier bands bearing the name ==
The original Murder Junkies was a Texas band formed independently of Allin which performed as his backing band for several live dates in the late 1980s.

The second Murder Junkies was a studio band including Allin's friend Mark Sheehan on guitar which recorded the Watch Me Kill six-track EP, released on Fuckin' A/Stomach Ache Records in 1991.

== Formation and career with Allin (1990–1993) ==
The third Murder Junkies lineup was formed in 1990 as Allin's new backing band and rehearsed while he concluded his prison sentence. The original line-up consisted of guitarist "Chicken" John Rinaldi (later a 2007 San Francisco mayoral candidate), GG's elder brother Merle Allin on bass, and drummer Donald "Dino Sex" Sachs.

Rinaldi left the band later in 1991, and voiced negative opinions about the experience in Todd Phillips's documentary Hated: GG Allin And The Murder Junkies. He was replaced by William Weber. Dee Dee Ramone was also recruited to play guitar at the same time as Weber, but quit shortly thereafter, without playing any live dates with the band.

GG Allin and the Murder Junkies recorded their sole studio album, Brutality and Bloodshed for All, for Alive Records in April 1993. Their subsequent tour, shortly followed by Allin's death from a drug overdose on June 28, was chronicled by roadie Evan Cohen in the book I Was A Murder Junkie: The Last Days Of GG Allin.

== Activity after Allin's death; breakup (1993–1999) ==
Dino, Merle, and Weber decided to continue the band, and recruited new singer Mike Denied, former bassist with New York City band The Denied. They released a mini-album Feed My Sleaze in 1995. "The Right To Remain Violent", a 7" single, appeared the following year.

The Murder Junkies toured throughout the 1990s and went through several more vocalists, including Mike Hudson, formerly of the Pagans (he only lasted for two shows in 1994), Jeff Clayton of Antiseen, and J. B. Beverley, a musician from the Washington, D.C. area. They broke up in 1999.

== Reformation, subsequent activity (2003–present) ==
The band reformed with Clayton singing for a tour in June 2003, the 10th anniversary of GG Allin's death. They performed alongside a version of Allin's first band, The Jabbers, for several shows.

In 2005, the band completed a tour of continental Europe. In 2006, they appeared at two shows supporting CKY, and toured as the opening act for Hank Williams III.

The band released the album Road Killers in 2011, followed by A Killing Tradition in 2013 and Killing For Christ Sakes the following year. The lineup currently features Merle Allin, Dino Sex, guitarist Duane Rollick, and vocalist Brandon Fergus.

== Discography ==
=== Studio albums ===
as GG Allin & The Murder Junkies

Year	Album	Label	Format
1993	Brutality and Bloodshed for All	Alive Records	LP

as The Murder Junkies

Year	Album	Label	Format
2011	Road Killer	MVD Audio	CD
2013	A Killing Tradition	MVD Audio	CD
2014	Killing For Christ Sakes	MVD Audio	CD

=== Live albums ===
as GG Allin & The Murder Junkies

Year	Album	Label	Format
1996	Terror in America	Alive Records	CD

=== Extended Plays ===
as The Murder Junkies

Year	Album	Label	Format
1995	Feed My Sleaze	Alive Records	10"
1996	The Right to Remain Violent	Vital Music	7"
2014	Gut Pit	MVD Audio	7"

=== Singles ===
as GG Allin & The Murder Junkies

Year	Album	Label	Format
1993	"Kill Thy Father, Rape Thy Mother"	Sympathy For The Record Industry	7"
