= Clermont Lounge =

Strip club in Atlanta, Georgia, United States

Coordinates: 33.77348°N 84.361302°W

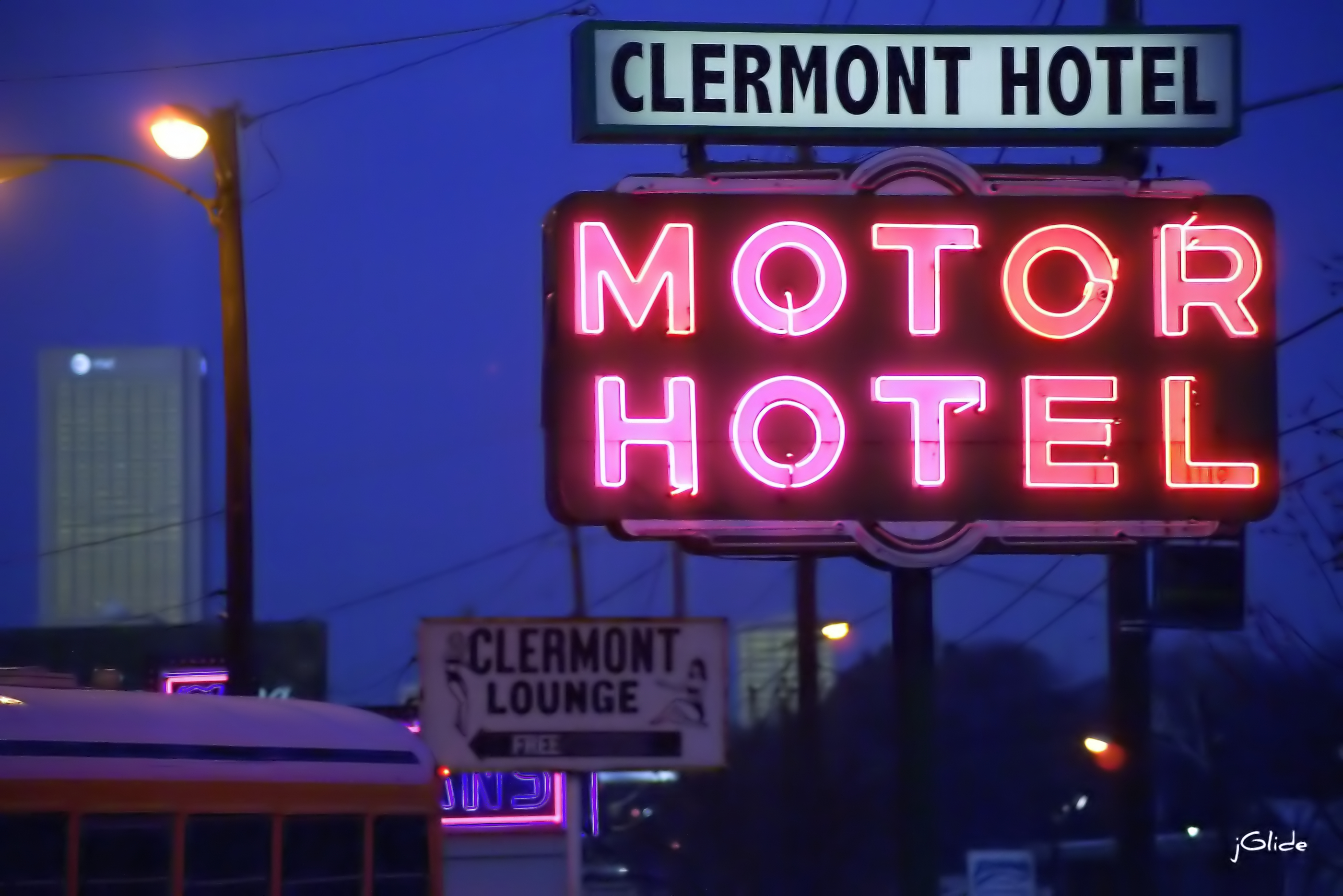
- Exterior signs of the Clermont
- Interactive map of Clermont Lounge
- Address: 789 Ponce de Leon Ave NE
- Location: Atlanta, Georgia, U.S.
- Owner: Tracey Brown; Kathi Martin
- Seating type: Lounge seating
- Type: Strip club / dive bar

Construction
- Opened: 1965

Website
- clermontlounge.net

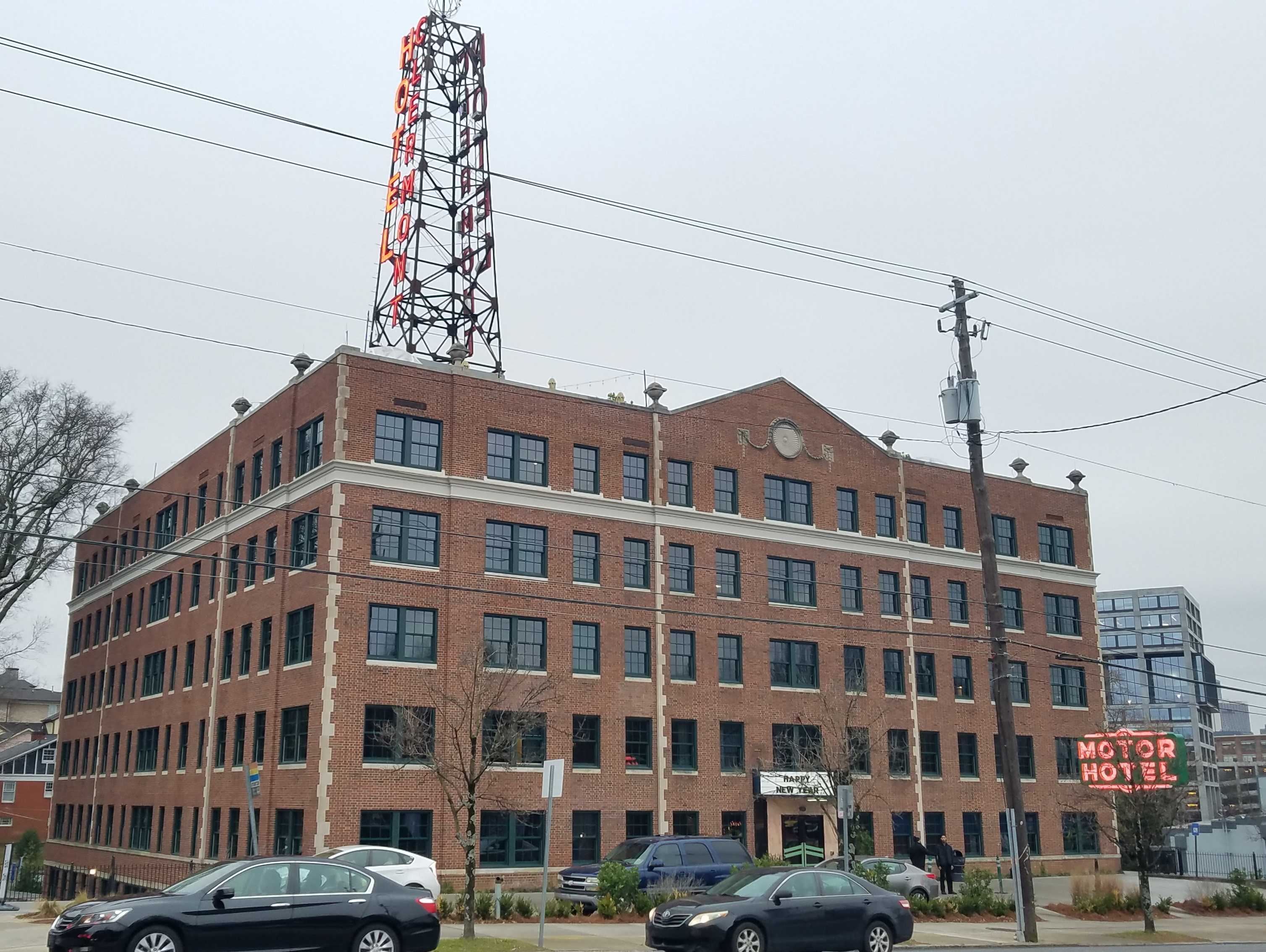
Hotel Clermont in 2020

The Clermont Lounge is Atlanta's first and longest continually operating strip club, opened in 1965, and boasts a completely female ownership. Located in the basement of the Clermont Motor Hotel at 789 Ponce De Leon Avenue, in the Poncey–Highland neighborhood, the dive bar has survived multiple attempts at being closed by the Atlanta city government, and has established a nationwide reputation for its kitschy atmosphere and unusual dancers.

Celebrities known to have visited the Clermont when in Atlanta include Anthony Bourdain, Colin Firth, Marilyn Manson, Cole Sprouse, Ashton Kutcher, Kid Rock, Steven Yeun, Skinny Lister, Lady Gaga, Eric Roberts, Jean Smart and Ming Chen, as well as David Cross, Leanne Morgan, and Bombay Bicycle Club. Visitors to the Clermont usually alternate between a few handfuls of regulars and large numbers of college students, newcomers to town, and tourists.

The Clermont does not serve food or draft beer, nor does it accept credit cards. The single dancer's stage is located in the middle of a circular bar, and the dancers choose (and pay for) their own songs on the in-house jukebox, as the club normally does not have an actual DJ.

== History ==
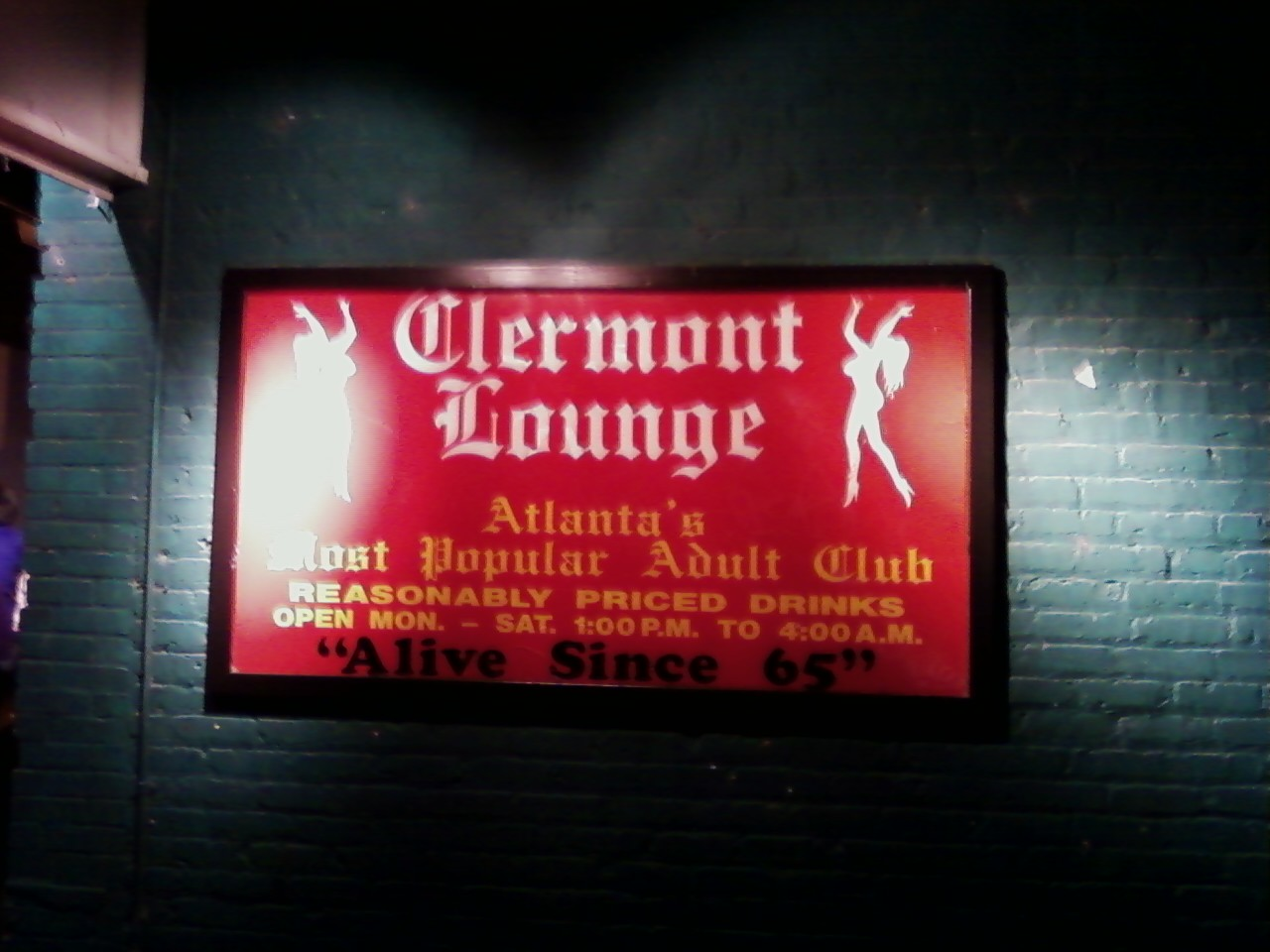
The Clermont Lounge

The Clermont Motor Hotel was built in 1924 and was originally an apartment building after its construction, but was later renovated to a hotel format. An early advertisement for a nightclub in the basement space is dated 1955 as an upscale supperclub. Later tenants included the "Gypsy Club" (c. 1951–1954), and "The Continental Room" (1954) before returning to the Anchorage name from about 1956 until 1963, when it was briefly known as the "Atlanta Playboy Club", an unofficial attempt to capitalize on the popularity of Hugh Hefner's magazine. A lawsuit closed the Atlanta Playboy Club. Clermont Lounge opened its doors within the Clermont Hotel in 1965 and has remained in place ever since. The entire building was sold to new owners in 2003.

Though sharing a building and half of a name, the Clermont Lounge and the Clermont Hotel above it are completely separate business entities. The lounge remained open even after the motel was closed and the lounge only closed for a brief period during the hotel's renovation. The hotel and the lounge are so separate that you can't access the lounge from anywhere inside the hotel. The Clermont Lounge has its own separate entrance in the back of the building near the hotel's valet parking area.

In December 2009, the health department ordered the hotel to close for numerous health code violations, including dirty linen, old bedding, bed bug stains, mold growing on the walls, black water spilling from faucets, and broken toilet fixtures.

Fairway Capital put the property on the market for sale in 2010. Clermont Hotel Partners LLC eventually bought it in January 2013 with the intent to redevelop the property as a boutique hotel. In 2018, the hotel reopened after an extensive renovation that brought the facility up to code while restoring and preserving the iconic details of the Clermont. The building was listed on the National Register of Historic Places in 2021.

== In popular culture ==
Anita Rae Strange, known by her stage name Blondie, has been a dancer at the Clermont lounge since 1979. Blondie was the subject of the 2012 film AKA Blondie, directed by Jon Watts.

Retired award-winning adult film actress Colleen Brennan began her adult-entertainment career in the late 1960s as a go-go or burlesque dancer at the Clermont Lounge.

Season 2 Episode 7 of the Travel Channel show The Layover, filmed in Atlanta and first airing in January 2013, features Anthony Bourdain and Alton Brown visiting the Clermont Lounge.

The Clermont has been featured on an episode of Insomniac with Dave Attell, airing in February 2002.

Just a few months before his death of a heroin overdose, shock rocker GG Allin wrote the song "Hotel Clermont (My Whorehouse)", released as the B-side to his 1993 single "Look Into My Eyes and Hate Me", during a period spent living in Room 216 of the adjacent hotel.

Bubba Sparxxx released the track "Claremont Lounge" in 2006, which uses a different spelling but was likely in reference to the Clermont.

== See also ==
- List of strip clubs
- Magic City (club)
- Hotels in Atlanta
- List of dive bars
