= William Gilmore Weber =

William Gilmore Weber III
- Also known as: Bill Weber
- Born: May 20, 1963 (age 63); Cincinnati, Ohio, United States
- Origin: 110 E Corry St Cincinnati, OH 45219
- Genres: Punk rock, shock rock
- Instrument: Guitar
- Labels: Alive Records, Crypt Records, Atavistic Records, Au Go Go Records, Sympathy, ROIR, Recess Records, Get Hip Records, Thrill Jockey, Vermiform Records, Hospital Records
- Website: www.williamweber.com/

William Gilmore Weber III (born May 20, 1963) is an American electric guitar player. Weber has made records, videos and films with a variety of bands.

Weber performed in GG Allin's final backing band The Murder Junkies, playing the electric guitar. He replaced Chicken John in the band. Weber performed on the sole GG Allin and the Murder Junkies studio album Brutality and Bloodshed for All. Following GG's untimely death, Weber performed in a continuation of the Murder Junkies, who eventually released a 10" mini-album (later re-released in an extended version on CD) entitled Feed My Sleaze. Weber's career with Allin encompassed three USA tours. A posthumous live album - Terror in America - appeared in 1994.

The genesis of GG Allin and the Murder Junkies and the Brutality and Bloodshed for All album was that the backing band was formed by GG's brother Merle while GG was still in prison. Both Dee Dee Ramone and Weber were hired as guitarists; while Accidental Tribe member Donald ('Dino Sex') Sachs was recruited on drums. Ramone left the band before he even played a live show (although a recording session, featuring both he and a newly released GG, is preserved on film); the remainder of the band composed music for their forthcoming set - later to form the Brutality and Bloodshed for All album, whilst GG composed the lyrics from his prison cell without previously hearing the music.

Weber has also made records, videos and films with the Chrome Cranks, The Candy Snatchers, The Tigerlilies, Sugarshock, The Brass Knuckle Boys, Human Zoo and as dumBASS.

Weber currently resides in Cincinnati, Ohio.
