= The Suicide Sessions =

Studio album by GG Allin
- Released: 1989
- Genre: Noise rock; hardcore punk; powerviolence
- Length: 45:13
- Label: Homestead Records; Awareness Records (1991 rerelease)
- Producer: GG Allin

GG Allin chronology
Banned in Boston (1989)	The Suicide Sessions (1989)	Doctrine of Mayhem (1990)

Professional ratings
Review scores
Source	Rating
AllMusic	3/5 stars

The Suicide Sessions is the sixth studio album released by American punk rock musician GG Allin, shortly before his arrest in September 1989.

The album was originally released on cassette in 1989, and rereleased in 1991 on Awareness Records alongside Allin's 1987 album You Give Love a Bad Name. The album was rereleased in 1997 on CD along with Allin's live album Anti-Social Personality Disorder – Live.

== Background ==
Allin later recalled: "The days were hot and nasty. I woke up in a pool of my own piss, sweating and stinking in my room in some seedy dive in Manchester, NH. Body odor, booze and death were always in the surrounding air. Tracy [his girlfriend] was in intensive care because of a suicide attempt...so was Jo Ann... For me death was around every corner. I went looking for it at any cost. Mark came by to pick me up one day to go to Lowell, Mass to record. What came out of these recordings were the Suicide Sessions... But on this tape you will hear the first blood of the recordings. The ones that never made the tape...or were rejected I'm not sure... So for hours Mark and I bashed and bled our very souls in a sweaty attack as I poured my interiors into every fucking breath. This is the outcome..."

At Allin's funeral in 1993, his brother Merle put a pair of headphones onto Allin's head, hooked to a portable cassette player which was playing the album.

== Track listing ==
Although listed in the track listing, the song "Kiss Me in the Gutter" does not appear on this album. It would later be released first as a B-Side to "No Room" (both rejected songs from this album) and later as its own single.

No.	Title	Length
1.	"Dagger in My Heart"	3:05
2.	"Shit on My Prick"	2:37
3.	"Cornhole Lust"	2:33
4.	"Spread Your Legs, Part Your Lips"	2:57
5.	"I Live to be Hated"	2:08
6.	"Stick a Cross Up a Nun's Cunt"	3:06
7.	"Jailed Again"	6:53
8.	"I Want to Burn"	1:17
9.	"Lilian Phone Fucker"	2:03
10.	"Pain & Suffering"	5:33
11.	"Troubled Troubador of Tomorrow"	2:26
12.	"Liquor Slicked Highway"	2:28
13.	"Can't Afford the Bail"	2:11
14.	"Drug Whore"	2:57
15.	"I Will Not Act Civilized"	1:34
16.	"I'm Dying, I'm Dying, I'm Dead"	1:25

== Personnel ==
- GG Allin – vocals (credited as "vocals, drugs, and abuse")
- Mark Sheehan – guitar
- Erik Mercier – bass guitar
- Greg Gonarea – drums
- Beth Burrow – credited as "victim"
