= Gimme Some Head =

Single by GG Allin
- B-side: "Dead Or Alive"
- Released: November 1, 1981
- Recorded: Fall 1980
- Studio: Dreamland Recording Studios
- Genre: Punk rock; garage punk; pop-punk
- Label: Orange
- Songwriter: GG Allin

GG Allin singles chronology
"Cheri Love Affair" (1980)	"Gimme Some Head" (1981)	"GG Allin's Xmas Song" (1988)

"Gimme Some Head" is a single by American punk rock musician GG Allin. It was released through Orange Records on November 1, 1981 with "Dead Or Alive" as the B-side.

== History ==
It features members of his first backing band The Jabbers as well as Wayne Kramer and Dennis Thompson of proto-punk band the MC5 (credited as the MC2) on lead guitar and drums respectively. The recording sessions for the song took place in fall 1980; these sessions also produced a third song entitled "Occupational Hazard", which was not released until the 1990s when it began circulating on bootlegs as "Occupation". The single sold around a couple thousand copies at the time of its release, making it Allin's best selling effort up until that point.

== Personnel ==
- GG Allin - lead vocals
- Rob Basso - rhythm guitar
- Alan Chapple - bass
- Wayne Kramer - lead guitar (credited as MC2)
- Dennis "Machine Gun" Thompson - drums (credited as MC2)

== Sources ==
- "GG Allin – Gimme Some Head 7″". Archived from the original on 2020-10-20.
- Gimme Some Head - G.G. Allin
