= Hated in the Nation (album) =

Compilation album by GG Allin
- Released: April 15, 1987; June 9, 1998 (reissue)
- Recorded: Fall 1980–1986
- Genres: Punk rock; garage punk; pop-punk; hardcore punk
- Length: 49:13 (original cassette); 56:18 (1998 CD reissue)
- Label: ROIR
- Producers: Kramer; David Peel; "Dick Urine"; Mykel Board

GG Allin chronology
The Sleaziest, Loosest Sluts (1986)	Hated in the Nation (1987)	You Give Love a Bad Name (1987)

Professional ratings
Review scores
Source	Rating
AllMusic	3/5 stars

Hated in the Nation is a compilation album by American musician GG Allin, released on cassette tape by ROIR in 1987. It consists mainly of then-out-of-print recordings by Allin with his early-era backing groups the Jabbers, the Scumfucs, and the Cedar St. Sluts. Hated in the Nation became Allin's first widespread international release. Since it is a compilation intended to both document Allin's early recording career up to that time and to attract new fans to his music, it is the only GG Allin title that has never gone out-of-print; according to his official website, it is also one of the most popular releases in Allin's discography.

== Track listing ==
=== Original 1987 cassette ===
The original cassette retitled some of the tracks in order to get the cassette into retail stores easier.

==== Side one ====
1. "Intro" (M. Board)
2. "Stimulation"
3. "I Wanna Fuck Myself" (listed as "Myself")
4. "Bite It You Scum" (listed as "Bite It")
5. "You Hate Me & I Hate You"
6. "GG's Phone Machine"
7. "Blood For You"
8. "Hard Candy Cock" (listed as "Hard Candy")
9. "Eat My Diarrhea" (listed as "Eat My Leftovers")
10. "Scumfuc Tradition" (listed as "Tradition")

==== Side two ====
1. "Drink, Fight and Fuck" (listed as "D F & F")
2. "Needle Up My Cock" (listed as "Needle")
3. "Sluts in the City"
4. "Ten Year Old Fuck" (listed as "Ten Year Old")
5. "Ass Fuckin' Butt Suckin' Cunt Lickin' Masturbation" (listed as "Multiple Forms of Self-Satisfaction")
6. "Gimme Some Head (listed as "Gimme Some", Allin's collaboration with Wayne Kramer and Dennis Thompson of the MC5)
7. "Tough Fuckin' Shit" (listed as "T.F.S.")
8. "Board's Phone Machine"

=== 1998 CD reissue ===
1. "Intro" (M. Board)
2. "Stimulation"
3. "I Wanna Fuck Myself"
4. "Bite It You Scum"
5. "You Hate Me & I Hate You"
6. "GG's Phone Machine"
7. "Blood for You"
8. "Hard Candy Cock"
9. "Eat My Shit"
10. "Scumfuck Tradition"
11. "Drink, Fight and Fuck"
12. "Needle Up My Cock"
13. "Sluts in the City"
14. "Ten Year Old Fuck"
15. "Ass Fuckin' Butt Suckin' Cunt Lickin' Masturbation"
16. "Gimme Some Head"
17. "Tough Fuckin' Shit"
18. "Board's Phone Machine"
19. "Radio Ad for GG's 1st Record"
20. "Out for Blood"
21. "I Wanna Eat You Out"
22. "Pissing on Cosloy" (a.k.a. "I Wanna Piss on You")
