= Banned in Boston (disambiguation) =

Banned in Boston was a phrase used to describe an artistic work prohibited from distribution or exhibition in Boston, Massachusetts.

Banned in Boston may also refer to:

- Banned in Boston (GG Allin album), a 1989 album by GG Allin
- Banned in Boston (The Jabbers album), a 1990 album by GG Allin & The Jabbers

== See also ==
- Boston band
