= That's Tough =

Television series

- Title Logo
- Genre: Documentary television Nonfiction; Countdown
- Created by: Adam Cohen; Cara Tapper; Joanna Vernetti
- Country of origin: United States
- Original language: English
- No. of seasons: 1
- No. of episodes: 8

Production
- Camera setup: Multiple-camera setup
- Running time: 22 minutes
- Production company: Super Delicious

Original release
- Network: G4
- Release: October 20 – December 8, 2010

That's Tough is an American documentary television series on G4. It was based on a concept by executive producers Adam Cohen, Cara Tapper, and Joanna Vernetti. No hosts were attached to the show and it was produced by Super Delicious Productions. Filming was based in Santa Monica, California, and eight episodes have been ordered for the first season. The series premiered on October 20, 2010 with all new episodes that aired every Wednesday at 8:30 pm until the season finale on December 8, 2010.

== Background ==
That's Tough opens up with: "You want tough? We're counting down the toughest..." The show reveals the toughest high-security prisons, sniper units, little people, and bank vaults. Other examples are: the toughest dictators, armored state cars, fighting styles, street gangs, special forces, and insects. G4TV ordered eight half-hour episodes of the series, which premiered on Oct. 20, 2010. Each episode will profile the three toughest entries in each category and countdown the top 5 or 3 of each.

Tagline: Dude Manrod (Kevin Pereira) says:

That's Tough is the most badass countdown on TV!

== Style ==
The toughest people, places or things in the world are identified utilizing footage and live-action recreations of some topics. An omniscient narration provides background information about each topic. Plus, expert testimony from various backgrounds is also offered during some of the topics.

== Specialists ==
- Jake Amar – Environmental engineer (toughest cleaning crews)
- Mike Burton – CEO, International Armoring Corporation (toughest armored cars)
- Thomas Carter – Corrections officer (toughest prison breaks)
- Joseph Childs – Little person stuntman (toughest little dudes)
- Lee Cohen – Former U.S. Navy commander, retired (toughest military sea vehicles)
- Timothy Crehan – Theologian (toughest monks)
- Anthony Davis – Security director (toughest bodyguards)
- John "Jack" Garafalo – Retired narcotics agent (toughest crime organizations)
- Kevin Hand – Vault door designer/vault expert (toughest mega vaults)
- Chris Hays – Professional sniper (toughest sniper units)
- Jimmy "Hillbilly" Herald – Huge rock music fan and rock historian (toughest rock stars)
- Eric Hess – Travel writer (toughest roads)
- James Hogue – Entomologist (toughest insects)
- Scott Jurek – Marathon champ (toughest foot races)
- Lew Knopp – Former U.S. Navy SEAL (toughest military courses)
- Richard Lichten – Retired jail watch commander (toughest prisons)
- Dr. Michael Siler – Professor of international relations (toughest modern dictators)
- Chris Stanko – Knife maker (Toughest blades)

== Episode guide ==
=== Season 1 (2010) ===
Ep. #	Episode Title	Original Airdate
1.1	Toughest Prisons, Armored Cars, and Little Dudes	October 20, 2010
Countdown Lists	Toughest Prisons: 5. Boulogne Summer Prison, Mendoza, Argentina (South America) – Built on top of a sewer system, this smelly prison crams 1,700 inmates in a building that only houses 500.; 4. Lurigancho Prison, Lima, Peru (South America) – The 10,000 inmates control this prison where they have to eat garbage and the guards are outnumbered 100 to 1.; 3. Black Beach Prison, Bioko Island, Equatorial Guinea (Africa) – This prison is located on a shark-infested island on the equator where inmates share their cells with festering rats and being starved by the guards.; 2. Bang Kwang Prison (aka "The Bangkok Hilton"), Bangkok, Thailand – For the first three months, prisoners are bound in leg irons, served one meal a day, and there is 130 inmates per cell with one crouching toilet. Prisoners who misbehave are brought to "Building 10", a 6x6 cell in total darkness used for solitary confinement.; 1. North Korean Gulag, North Korea (Asia) – There are 250,000 prisoners behind bars and they're used for slave labor in the mines and fields. Also used as human guinea pigs in the hospital so the doctors can practice without medicine for chemical weapons testing—that's why 25% of inmates die per year here.; (Softest Prison: Federal Penitentiary, Pensacola, Florida – Used for white collar inmates where they spend their time playing golf, strolling in the park, and enjoy movie nights.) Toughest Little Dudes: 4. Kiran Shaw (aka "Little Kiran") – At 4'1", he's the world's smallest stuntman. He wing walks on planes without a parachute at 1,000 feet at 120 mph.; 3. Mighty Mike – 4'3" bodybuilder/powerlifter. At the age of 16 years, he was the only dwarf in the powerlifting competition to win contests by benching three times his body weight (around 300 lbs). He toured with Mötley Crüe as a fire-eater for their carnival stage act.; 2. Bushwick Bill – 3'8" gangster rapper of the Geto Boys (1991 rap group). In a suicidal rage, Bill wanted his girlfriend to shoot him but ended up shooting his eye out and was featured on the album cover in the hospital. Legally changed his name to "Dr. Wolfgang von Bushwaicken the Barbarian Mother Funky Star High Dollar Billstir". In 2008, Bill got jail time when he was arrested for assault.; 1. Puppet "The Psycho Dwarf" – Leader and reality television star of the midget wrestling troupe, Half Pint Brawlers. This 4'4" wrestler has a high threshold for pain: dives on broken glass and tacks, and staples paper money to his gentiles.; (Softest Dwarf: Aditya "Romeo" Dev – 2'9" dancer from India.) Toughest Armored Cars: 5. Pope Benedict XVI's Mercedes-Benz ML-430 (aka "Popemoblie") – Features bulletproof wrap-around windows.; 4. German Chancellor Angela Merkel's Audi A8 – Solid bulletproofing against firepower and armor plated with a 420hp V12 engine.; 3. Queen of the United Kingdom Elizabeth II's Bentley Arnage – Armored plated 460 hp twin turbo V8 engine that goes 0 to 60 in less than 6 seconds.; 2. World Leaders Mercedes-Benz S-600 Pullman Guard – This 3,970 pound armored car has 100% protection and passed the bomb test with 5 on top and 5 underneath car.; 1. President Barack Obama's Cadillac One (aka "The Beast") – It is a tank with 5 inches of armor, 8-inch-thick doors, tear gas, classified weapons and engine specs, but only gets 8 miles per gallon of gas. It also has the president's blood plasma bags in the trunk just in case of emergencies.	
Overview	"Heads up! We're taking you around the world counting down the toughest people, places, and things. From hardcore prisons that'll make grown men cry to armored cars that take a lickin' and keep on truckin'...now That's Tough!"	
1.2	Toughest Special Forces, Taxi Drivers, and Rites of Passage	October 27, 2010
Countdown Lists	Toughest Special Forces: 5: French Foreign Legion; 4: Spetsnaz; 3: SASR; 2: Delta Force; 1: Mossad	
Overview	TBA	
1.3	Toughest Crime Organizations, Rock & Rollers, and Military Sea Vehicles	November 3, 2010
Countdown Lists	Toughest Crime Organizations: 4. 'Ndrangheta (means "Brave Defiant One"), Italy – Started out as a gambling group in the 1880s in the Calabrian hills. Today, this organization is involved in contract killing, murder, extortion, and drug trafficking (make up 80% of Europe's cocaine trade). New recruits had to take a strict code of silence called "Omerta" by cutting off their finger and putting the blood on the picture of a saint.; 3. Chinese Triads, China – There are over 250,000 members worldwide in the U.S., UK, Australia, and New Zealand. Their specialties are contract killing, identity theft, car bombing, prostitution, money laundering, drug running, and human trafficking. Their signature weapon is the meat cleaver and their initiation ceremony is to kill a live chicken, mix its blood with their own, and drink it.; 2. Bratva (means "Brotherhood") (aka "Russian Mafia"), Russia – Made up of ex-KGB members with 6,000 syndicates in Russia and 2,000 in the U.S., this organization began with the fall of the Iron Curtain controls 40% of Russia's GDP. Godfather Sergei Mikhailov was prosecuted and two key witnesses (a father and son) were killed before trial. Also, their role model Alexander Solonik was infamous for his two-handed gunfire and accuracy when killing enemies.; 1. La Familia (aka "The Family"), Mexico – This is the most dangerous crime organization and drug cartel in the world. For their debut, they left 5 severed heads in a club just to send a message. They specialize in torturing and beheading enemies. They're the leading supplier of methylamine with super meth labs all over the country making 100 pounds per day pulling in $11 million/day. They murdered 12 federal Mexican agents because they believe in "divine justice". They have their own bible and religion, and supplies food and medicine to poor villages as a modern-day Robin Hood.; Toughest Rock Stars in the World: 3. Ozzy Osbourne (aka "Prince of Darkness") (Black Sabbath) – Godfather of heavy metal, this rocker burned Gideon Bibles, defecated on hotel room floors, and bit the head of a bat on stage during a concert in Des Moines, Iowa. Also bit the head off of a dove during a record deal signing. Ozzy's body is so tough that scientists have tested it.; 2. G.G. Allin (Texas Nazis) – This shock rocker of punk rock liked urinating and defecating on stage during his shocking live performances and roll around in it. He often performed totally naked, would attack audience members, and cut up his body with knives.; 1. Mayhem (black metal band from Norway) – They would impale real live animal heads into stakes during their live shows. First lead singer named "Dead" committed suicide in 1991. When guitarist "Euronymous" found him dead, he went out and bought a disposable camera and took a picture of Dead's body for the album cover then made a stew of Dead's brains. Other members include: "Manic", "Necrobutcher", "Hellhammer", and "Blasphemer".; Toughest Sea Vehicles: 3. Skjold class patrol boat, Norway (Europe) – Built to protect Norway's 12,000-mile coastline, this 156-foot Norwegian fighter has a top speed of 70 mph, making it the fastest warship on earth. Invisible to enemies, the ship features special non-scratch coating that absorbs most radar waves because it was built with no right angles. Weapons: 76 millimeter rapid-fire cannon blasts two 27 pound shells. The defense system is called "MASS" (Multi-Ammunition Softkill System) which launches decoys to enemy fire.; 2. Super Dvora MK-3 Patrol Boat, Israel (Middle East) – This 90 feet long, 70 ton 55 mph ship is designed to stop terrorists from entering the country by sea. Only 3-foot hull for shallow water to hit the beach quickly. Weapons: 30 millimeter anti-aircraft gun that fires at a 3,300-foot altitude vertical range and a typhoon cannon link to a gyroscope. Also has two propulsion systems that feature a jet ski system and thrust vectoring system.; 1. Arleigh Burke class destroyer, (U.S. Navy) United States (North America) – The most dangerous warship in the world, the ship's seen action in Desert Storm operations where it launched tomahawk missile strikes and helped maintain a "no fly zone" in its aftermath. The ship is named after one of the U.S. Navy's most decorated admirals in history, Admiral Arleigh Burke, 18-year veteran of World War II and Korea who sank 12 enemy ships and shot down 30 enemy fighters. The ship is 500 feet long with 11 different weapon systems (most in any navy): Mark 56 torpedoes to take out submarines, and vertical missiles that launch at rapid-fire. It also has double layered steel armored plating hull that can withstand chemical and biological attacks, missile fire and nuclear blasts.	
Overview	"Get ready to rock! This is our countdown to the toughest in the world. From crime organizations who kill for money and power to military sea ships that bring the big guns. put on your big boy pants and get ready for...That's Tough!"	
1.4	Toughest Bodyguards, Mega Vaults, and Monks	November 10, 2010
Countdown Lists	Toughest Bodyguards: 5. Pontifical Swiss Guard Corps, Vatican City, Italy (Europe) – Been around for 500 years, these 110 men guard the leader of the catholic church (they protect the pope). Trained in hand-to-hand combat. Signature uniform: puffy-sleeved tunics of blue, yellow, and red vertical stripes. Arsenal: SIG Sauer 9mm pistol and H&K submachine gun.; 4. Osama bin Laden's Bodyguards, Afghanistan – Their leader is on the FBI's top 10 fugitive list with a $25 million bounty. 40 bodyguards on-call 24/7, trained at Al Queda camps in car bombing tactics, hijacking, counterfeiting, and enduring torture. NOTE: It is not known what has become of them since Bin Laden's death.; 3. Muammar Gaddafi's Bodyguards, Libya, Africa – This leader who constantly receives death threats, is protected by a posse of 50 female bodyguards. Claims he wants to modernize Libya by promoting liberation for women especially in Arabic countries where women have no rights. NOTE: As with the previous squad, it is not known what has happened to this group of guards either.; 2. U.S. Secret Service, United States of America – Protects politicos in the U.S. and overseas. Keeps the president alive and safe at all times. These plain-clothed agents carry semiautomatic pistols and concealed submachine guns. Intensive training lasts 28 weeks where they run different scenarios, such as airport visits and assassination attempts. Agents must be prepared to be human shields by throwing themselves in the line of fire for a V.I.P. If an agent is mortally wounded, they must execute the "dead man's 10 seconds" (must return fire on enemies during their last 10 seconds of life before they die).; 1. Kim Jong Il's Bodyguards, North Korea, (Asia) – This leader recruits young high school kids for his bodyguards. They are given a number for their name and cut all ties to their family forever. Training: recruits wear bulky hazmat suits while shooting targets resembling American troops. Anyone who gets too close to their leader has to "shoot first, ask questions later" even if it's a mistake. If a bodyguard leaves, they are beaten close to death or in some cases killed. NOTE: It can be assumed, with Kim Jong Il's death, that it now protects Kim Jong Un.; Toughest Mega Vaults: 4. Antwerp Diamond Center, Antwerp, Belgium (Europe) – 15 diamond merchants got together to design this vault. Holds 70% of the world's diamonds, 3 ton steel door, can withstand 12 hours of drilling, 99 digit combo lock with over 100 million combinations.; 3. WS3 Vaults, (series of vaults spread across Europe: Belgium, France, Germany, Greece, the Netherlands, Italy, Spain, UK) – 249 WS3 vaults in Europe, NATO-maintained underground bunkers that houses nuclear warheads in reinforced 10–12-foot thick concrete walls. X-ray and gamma ray proof making it withstand a nuclear blast.; 2. Swiss Fort Knox, Gstaad, Switzerland – This $20 million safehouse hidden literally in the Alps was built by the Swiss Banking Services. Protects all the out-dated software and hardware technology in world. It protects people's ability to access outdated data formats. Basically, its one big backup. Protected by the Swiss army with a 3 1/2-ton front door of rock, a retina scan, a geometric facial scan, and even a nose and lip scan.; 1. Federal Reserve Bank of New York, New York City, New York (USA) – Underground vault built in bedrock 80 feet below street level. Holds 8,000 tons of gold (25% of the world's supply, worth $25 billion). Entrance is a narrow passageway cut through rotating steel cylinders weighing 80 tons. Guarded by an army of police with assault weapons.; Toughest Monks: 3. Carthusian Monks, Grenoble, France (Europe) – Catholic monks who dedicate their lives to sacrifice. Sleep on thin beds made out of straw and wear itchy horsehair robes to avoid sensual pleasure. Scourge themselves by whipping their body when physical pleasure or thoughts get the better of them. Live in freezing cold temperatures with only a small tin stove in their room. Only 5% of novices become monks.; 2. Shaolin Monks, China (Asia) – Practice Wushu (Kung-fu) every day. Fight to the death to protect their temple. Uses a variety of weapons: saber, staff, sword, pitchfork, spade, nine-section whip, and three-section staff. 17-year-old trainees should be able to deflect a spear tip with his neck, carry a 2-pound weight from their groin, and sleep standing on one leg.; 1. Tendai Buddhist Monks (aka "Marathon Monks"), Japan (Asia) – They run to achieve greater enlightenment and become a saint. Run 1,000-day marathon which takes 7 years to complete. First 6 years, they run 25 miles a day for 100 days. Then in the 7th year, they run 52 miles a day for 100 days (equals 2 Olympic marathons back-to-back for 100 days). They run in straw sandals, only thing they stop for is for meditation—no rest or eating. Each monk carries a knife on a rope called the "code of death", which is their duty to take their own life if they fail. Since 1885, only 46 monks completed whole running ritual—so they're 46 monks throughout the years.	
Overview	"You better run for cover! We got the list of the toughest in the world. From bodyguards who take a bullet for their boss to mega vaults that can take a nuke. Time to man up for...That's Tough!"	
1.5	Toughest Modern Dictators, Foot Races, and Blades	November 17, 2010
Countdown Lists	TBD: 4.; 3.; 2.; 1.	
Overview	TBA	
1.6	Toughest Sniper Units, Roads, and Cleaning Crews	November 24, 2010
Countdown Lists	Toughest Sniper Units: 4. Finnish Army Snipers, Finland – (1939 War with Russia); 3. Canadian Army Snipers, Canada – (World War I, World War II, Middle East) Motto: "No warning. Sans remorse".; 2. British Army Snipers, England – (Middle East); 1. U.S. Marine Corps Scout Snipers, United States – (Middle East) Motto: "One shot. One kill". Weapon: McMillian Tac-50 with XM-33 armor-piercing bullets.; Toughest Roads in the World: 4. Russian Federal Highway, Russia – (aka: "Highway From Hell") Remote 3,000-mile-long road from Moscow to Yakutsk in the Siberian wilderness.; 3. North Yungas Road, Bolivia – (aka: "Road of Death") Begins in La Paz with a 57-mile one lane road through the Andes of blind curves and 3,000-foot drop-offs ending in Coroico. For a safe passage, drivers pray to the goddess Pachmama by pouring beer onto road. 200-300 people die each year.; 2. Trans-African Highway, Africa – 4,000-mile road through dense jungles which goes through dangerous areas: Democratic Republic of Congo where a civil war is raging and Uganda where rebels kidnap children.; 1. Kabul-Jalalabad Road, Afghanistan – Zig-zagging through a narrow 100-mile road with jagged mountains, drivers without licenses, and children who are utilized as traffic lights by holding a Coke bottle for a red stop light and a Sprite bottle for a green light.; Toughest Cleaning Crews in the World: 4. Oil Spill Cleanup Crews – exposed to crude oil and chemicals that cause cancer.; 3. Meth Lab Cleanup Crews – exposed to acids, metals, and chemicals used to make meth which can cause organ damage leading to death.; 2. Crime Scene Cleanup Crews – clean up body parts, blood, and guts.; 1. New Delhi Sewer Crews (New Delhi, India) – workers climb down into human waste in the 3,700-mile sewer system. 1,000 people were killed in 7 years from fumes, gas, and raw sewer water.	
Overview	"Look sharp...we're counting down the world's most toughest. From sniper units that can kill from a mile away to roads so tough, you'll crap your pants to crews who can clean the nasty messes no one else wants to."	
1.7	Toughest Fighting Styles, Miners, and Insects	December 1, 2010
Countdown Lists	Toughest Fighting Style: 4. Karate, (Japan); 3. Mauy Thai, (Thailand); 2. Krav Maga, (Israel); 1. Defendu, (United Kingdom); Toughest Miners: 3. Salt miners; 2. Gold miners; 1. Chinese coal miners; Toughest Insects: 5. Dung beetle (Everywhere); 4. Golden orb-web spider (Australia, Asia, Africa, Americas); 3. Cockroach, (Everywhere); 2. Bulldog ant (Myrmecia), (Australia); 1. Asian giant hornet, (Honshu, Japan); (Wimpiest Insect: Mayfly (North America)	
Overview	"Prepare to get the creepy-crawlies when we show you the toughest bugs on earth--from a spider big enough to eat a bird to nuke-resistant cockroaches to hornets badass enough to decapitate bees! Then, meet the toughest miners, including salt miners who work without drinking water and Chinese coal miners who might not survive the workday. Finally, we count down the toughest fighting styles, including bone-crunching Krav Maga and a killing method that helped win World War II."	
1.8	Toughest Street Gangs, Military Training Courses, and Prison Escapes	December 8, 2010
Countdown Lists	Toughest Street Gangs: 4. PCC (Primeiro Comando da Capital), Sao Paulo, Brazil; 3. Latin Kings, Chicago, Illinois; 2. MS-13 (Mara Salvatrucha), Los Angeles, California; 1. Mungiki, Kenya; Most Punishing Military Training Courses: 4. British Royal Marines Commando Course, England, Europe; 3. U.S. Navy SEALs "The O-Course" (The Obstacle Course), Coronado, California, USA; 2. Chinese People's Liberation Army Training Course, Guangzhou, China, Asia; 1. Spetsnaz Training Course, Russia, Europe; Toughest Prison Breaks: 3. Antonio Ferrara Prison Break, Fersnes Prison, France (May 1, 2003); 2. Kazimierz Piechowski Escape, Auschwitz concentration camp, Nazi Germany (June 20, 1942); 1. I.R.A. Maze Prison Breakout, (38 inmates) The Maze Prison, Northern Ireland (September 25, 1983); (Wimpiest Military Training: Italian Military Police – features wine tasting)	
Overview	"Counting down the absolute toughest...from street gangs who dish out major hurt to military training courses that bring the pain. Plus the most badass prison breaks of all time."	
