= The Troubled Troubadour =

Compilation album by GG Allin
- Released: 1996; November 21, 2000
- Recorded: Mid 1982–December 1990
- Genre: Punk rock; country
- Length: 65:36
- Label: Mountain Records
- Producer: GG Allin; Stewart Brodian

GG Allin chronology
Terror in America (1996)	The Troubled Troubadour (1996)

The Troubled Troubadour is a posthumous expanded compact disc edition of punk rock singer-songwriter and musician GG Allin's original 1990 7-inch EP of the same name.

== Track listing ==
All songs written by GG Allin except where noted.

1. "When I Die" – 3:52
2. "Liquor Slicked Highway" – 2:55
3. "Sitting in This Room" – 2:53
4. "Kissing The Flames" – 2:35
  - Recorded on four-track cassette in Boston, MA in May 1989. Tracks 1–3 previously released as The Troubled Troubador 7-inch EP in 1990. Track 4 is an outtake from those sessions.
5. "Rowdy Beer Drinkin' Night" – 3:04
  - 1985 acoustic demo performed and recorded by GG Allin, location unknown.
6. "Up Against the Wall" (Ohio Express) – 2:03
  - 1982 recording with The Jabbers, first released on the No Rules EP.
7. "Conversation #1" – 25:51
  - Recorded by Stewart Brodian in December 1990
8. "Conversation #2" – 11:46
  - Recorded by Stewart Brodian in June 1990
9. "Conversation #3" – 3:10
  - Recorded by Stewart Brodian in July 1990
10. "Spoken Word #1 – The Price" – 1:52
  - Recorded by GG in Chicago 1988
11. "Dead Flowers" (Mick Jagger/Keith Richards) – 4:47
  - Recorded in June 1989 with The Disappointments, Staches, Columbus, OH.
12. "Spoken Word #2 – I Will Not Act Civilized" – 0:48
  - Recorded by GG in Chicago 1988
