= Carnival of Excess: Limited Edition =

Studio album by GG Allin & The Criminal Quartet
- Released: February 4, 2016; 1995 (original release)
- Recorded: July 28, 1991
- Genre: Outlaw country; acoustic
- Length: 31:51
- Label: Ponk Media; Vinyl Retentive Productions (original release)
- Producer: Paul Reller; Mark Kramer

GG Allin & The Criminal Quartet chronology
Terror in America (1996)	Carnival of Excess: Limited Edition (2016)

Original cover

Carnival of Excess: Limited Edition is a limited edition reissue of the album Carnival of Excess, released by American punk rock musician GG Allin, and recorded with his backing band the Criminal Quartet. This release, which contains previously unreleased mixes of the songs from the original album (with one exception, "Outskirts of Life", which used the mix from the original 1995 release), was issued in limited editions of 100 white vinyl albums and 1200 compact discs. Added to the original release is a mock-commercial for the album featuring Tiny Tim and excerpts from a phone conversation with Allin about the album. Unlike many other GG Allin recordings, this release featured songs in the vein of country music, many of them acoustic.

== Track listing ==
1. "Son of Evil"
2. "Guns Bitches Brawls and Bottles"
3. "Carmelita" (Warren Zevon)
4. "Outskirts of Life"
5. "Fuck Authority"
6. "Watch Me Kill"
7. "A Snake (Cold and Hard)"
8. "GG + Tiny Tim on COE"
9. "No Rights"
10. "Borrowed Time"
11. "Pick Me Up (On Your Way Down)" (Axton, Levy, Reeves)

All songs written by GG Allin and Bob Widenhofer except where noted.

Note

- The original writers and composers of "Pick Me Up..." were not credited on this release.

== Vinyl listing ==
Side One

1. "GG Speaks on COE"
2. "Son of Evil"
3. "Guns, Bitches, Brawls & Bottles"
4. "Fuck Authority"

Side Two

1. "Outskirts of Life"
2. "Carmelita"
3. "A Snake (Cold and Hard)"
4. "Watch Me Kill"

Notes

- Vinyl also contained special print essay hand written in GG Allin's own words, from the time GG spent in July 1991 Tampa, FL while recording the album.
- Songs, "No Rights", "Borrowed Time", "Pick Me Up (On Your Way Down)" did not appear on the vinyl version of the album.

== Personnel ==
- GG Allin – vocals, backing vocals, acoustic guitar
- Bob Widenhofer – guitars
- Andy Irvine – bass
- Paul Reller – drums, piano, accordion
- Shireen Kadaver (credited as "The Razor") – backing vocals on "Carmelita", "A Snake" and "Pick Me Up".

Tracks 9–11 are performed solo by Allin on vocals and acoustic guitar, with the exception of Pick Me Up, which features slight backing vocals from Kadaver.
