= J. B. Beverley =

American musician

J.B. Beverley (born July 11, 1977) is an American musician. Born Joshua Beverley, Beverley goes by the nickname "J.B." which he acquired in grade school. Reared in a musical household, Beverley grew up on early country, bluegrass, rockabilly, big band, and various forms of old time blues.

== Life ==
Learning the drums and guitar, Beverley formed his first band The Bad Habits in 1993. An old-school punk sound, rooted in influences like The Misfits, FEAR, Black Flag, and Motörhead, the Bad Habits achieved notoriety on the central east coast. The band broke up in 1996, and later that year, a posthumous live compilation EP was released on Green Tree's Records entitled "Live For Some Beer Money".

With the Bad Habits gone, Beverley drifted for over a year. Working odd jobs and traveling around the country. J.B. began writing old time country blues songs and busking on street corners to get by. In 1998 he began commuting between the Washington DC area and New York City having become front-man of The Murder Junkies, former backing band of the late GG Allin.

In 1999, J.B. spent several months in Florida fine-tuning his country blues songs, and re-learning some old standards. He re-emerged in the DC area later that year with honky-tonk outfit The Wayward Drifters, and subsequently began touring locally and regionally with the band.

In the fall of 2002, J.B. formed another punk rock band, The Little White Pills. Reminiscent of the Bad Habits, the Little White Pills were a heavier, more refined band - yet with a rough edge. The band released a self-produced CD in 2003 entitled "Live At The Velvet Lounge", did a summer tour that year, and a couple of weekenders the year after.

In 2004, J.B. rejoined the Murder Junkies for two tours, and the Wayward Drifters released a self-produced CD entitled Highball. J.B. also found time to record some local projects and work on new material for all of his respective bands.

In 2005, the Wayward Drifters embarked on a spring tour called "The American Highball Tour", and spent most of the summer touring with friend Hank Williams III.

A follow-up Wayward Drifters album, Watch America Roll By was released in 2009.

In the meantime, Beverley has been working on a long-awaited metal side project called GHOSTDANCE.

J.B. Beverley and the Wayward Drifters continue to tour both regionally and nationally, and - as of November 2015 - Beverley is touring solo.

== Discography ==
- "Live At The Velvet Lounge" - 2003 - self-produced CD.(The Little White Pills )
- Highball - 2004 - self-released CD. (Out of Print) VERY RARE(The Wayward Drifters )
- Live From The Heartland - self-released CD. (Out of Print) VERY RARE(The Wayward Drifters)
- Dark Bar & A Jukebox CD - 2006 - Helltrain Records(The Wayward Drifters)
  - Dark Bar & A Jukebox Vinyl Album - 2007 - Helltrain Records(The Wayward Drifters)
- Watch America Roll By CD - 2009 - Helltrain Records/ Crumvillain Records (The Wayward Drifters)
- Stripped to the Root CD - 2013 - Rusty Knuckles Music
