= Brutality and Bloodshed for All =

Studio album by GG Allin & The Murder Junkies
- Released: September 1993
- Recorded: April 1993
- Genre: Hardcore punk, heavy metal
- Length: 38:43
- Label: Alive Records
- Producer: Don Fury; GG Allin; The Murder Junkies

GG Allin & The Murder Junkies chronology
War in My Head – I'm Your Enemy (1993)	Brutality and Bloodshed for All (1993)	Layin' Up With Linda (1993)

Alternative cover

Professional ratings
Review scores
Source	Rating
AllMusic	3/5 stars

Brutality and Bloodshed for All is the eighth and final studio album by American punk rock musician GG Allin, recorded with his backing band the Murder Junkies. Released after his death in 1993, the first recording on Alive Records. All songs were written while GG Allin was in Michigan State Prison. Copies of the album come with a photograph of GG Allin's body from his viewing, alongside a copy of his birth and death certificates.

== Track listing ==
All CD copies of Brutality and Bloodshed for All come with a bonus track (titled "My Sadistic Killing Spree") that is not found on any other version. Additionally, later CD reissues of Brutality and Bloodshed for All claim to have a completely different track listing, yet follows the same exact ordering as other versions, except for the appearance of the bonus track.

All tracks are written by GG Allin and William Gilmore Weber, except where noted.

No.	Title	Writer(s)	Length
1.	"Highest Power"	Allin	0:59
2.	"Kill Thy Father, Rape Thy Mother"		2:25
3.	"Anal Cunt"	Allin • Merle Allin	3:50
4.	"Raw, Brutal, Rough and Bloody"		2:05
5.	"Shoot, Knife, Strangle, Beat, and Crucify"		4:52
6.	"I Kill Everything I Fuck"		2:33
7.	"Shove That Warrant Up Your Ass"		2:54
8.	"My Sadistic Killing Spree"		2:00
9.	"I'll Slice Yer Fucking Throat"		2:05
10.	"Terror in America"		2:00
11.	"Fuck Off, We Murder"	Allin • Weber • Peter Aaron	2:29
12.	"Take Aim and Fire"		2:35
13.	"Bastard Son of a Loaded Gun"		2:37
14.	"Legalize Murder"	Allin • M. Allin	3:12
15.	"Brutality and Bloodshed for All"	Allin • M. Allin	3:26
Total length:			38:43

== Personnel ==
- GG Allin – vocals
- William Gilmore Weber III – guitar, backing vocals
- Merle Allin – bass, backing vocals
- Donald “Dino Sex” Sachs – drums, backing vocals

On track 5: David Peel, Barbara Kitson, Kembra Pfahler, Johnny Puke – backing vocals
