= Bittersweet Motel =

2000 film directed by Todd Phillips

- Directed by: Todd Phillips
- Starring: Phish
- Cinematography: Elia Lyssy
- Edited by: Alan Oxman
- Release date: August 25, 2000
- Running time: 82 minutes

Bittersweet Motel is a 2000 documentary film about the rock band Phish directed by Todd Phillips. With him covering the band's summer and fall 1997 tours, plus footage from their 1998 summer tour of Europe. The documentary ends with The Great Went, a giant two-day festival held in upstate Maine that attracted 70,000 people.

The film's title comes from a Phish song of the same name, which is featured at the end of the movie.

== Songs ==
Most songs that appear in the film were performed live unless noted. Eight cover songs are featured in the film, including the rehearsal and debut of Ween's "Roses Are Free" from their Chocolate and Cheese album. Two other notable debuts captured in the film are an early version of "Sleep" (played solo by Trey on his Languedoc guitar for the cameras which would later appear on their 2000 album Farmhouse) and a soundcheck of the band performing what was at the time the new faster-arpeggiated version of "Water in the Sky" that would be seen later that year in studio form on their 1998 album The Story of the Ghost.

The song list does not follow the order in which the scenes were shot. "The Great Went" appears as the climax of the film, though in reality, it was the first footage that Phillips shot for the movie.

Live Songs
Order Of Appearance	Song	Date	Venue	Original Artist
1	Brian And Robert	7/2/1998	The Grey Hall - Freetown Christiana, Copenhagen Denmark	Phish
2	Roses Are Free	12/11/1997	Rochester War Memorial - Rochester NY	Ween
3	Down With Disease	12/11/1997	Rochester War Memorial - Rochester NY	Phish
4	Waste	12/11/1997	Rochester War Memorial - Rochester NY	Phish
5	New Year Countdown > Auld Lang Syne > Tweezer	12/31/1997	Madison Square Garden - New York NY	Phish > Traditional > Phish
6	When The Circus Comes	7/9/1998	Zeleste - Barcelona Spain	Los Lobos
7	Water In The Sky (soundcheck)	6/30/1998	The Grey Hall - Freetown Christiana, Copenhagen Denmark	Phish
8	Frankenstein	7/8/1998	Zeleste - Barcelona Spain	Edgar Winter Group
9	Wilson	7/8/1998	Zeleste - Barcelona Spain	Phish
10	Hello My Baby	7/8/1998	Zeleste - Barcelona Spain	Traditional
11	Punch You In The Eye _{(audio only; background music during "On the Way to The Great Went" montage)}	12/11/1997	Rochester War Memorial - Rochester NY	Phish
12	Character Zero	8/16/1997	The Great Went - Limestone ME	Phish
13	The Squirming Coil	8/16/1997	The Great Went - Limestone ME	Phish
14	Simple	8/16/1997	The Great Went - Limestone ME	Phish
15	Also Sprach Zarathustra	8/17/1997	The Great Went - Limestone ME	Deodato
16	Loving Cup	8/16/1997	The Great Went - Limestone ME	The Rolling Stones
17	Art Jam	8/17/1997	The Great Went - Limestone ME	Phish

Additional off-stage performances include:

Brian and Robert (rehearsal and performance) _{July 2, 1998 - The Grey Hall, Freetown Christiana, Copenhagen, Denmark}

Birds of a Feather (rehearsal) _{March 1998 - Unknown House, Burlington VT}

Sleep _{March 1998?- Trey's Barn, VT}

Love Me (Leiber and Stoller) (backstage rehearsal Mike and Trey) _{December 31, 1997 - Madison Square Garden, New York NY}

Bittersweet Motel (backstage - Trey, Page, & Tom Marshall) _{July 8, 1998 - Zeleste, Barcelona, Spain}

The following performances were not featured in the film but were included as bonus footage included on the VHS and DVD releases:

Punch You in the Eye (bonus track 1) _{December 11, 1997 - Rochester War Memorial, Rochester, NY}

Big Black Furry Creatures from Mars (bonus track 3) _{December 11, 1997 - Rochester War Memorial, Rochester, NY}

Dirt (bonus track 4, after Page interview) _{December 11, 1997 - Rochester War Memorial, Rochester, NY}

Maze (bonus track 5) _{December 11, 1997 - Rochester War Memorial, Rochester, NY}

Lawn Boy (bonus track 8, after Page interview) _{August 16, 1997 - The Great Went, Limestone ME}

== Home media ==
The film was released on DVD and VHS on March 6, 2001. Both formats feature extra footage, including uncut live performances of Punch You in the Eye, Maze, Big Black Furry Creature from Mars, and Lawn Boy, as well as additional interview sequences that didn't make it into the film. The DVD edition also includes the original theatrical trailer and an interview with director Todd Phillips and offers Dolby Digital 5.1 and DTS Surround Sound. The film is presented in its original 1.85:1 Theatrical Aspect Ratio however the DVD is not anamorphic.

== Personnel ==
Phish

- Trey Anastasio - guitars, vocals
- Page McConnell - keyboards, vocals
- Mike Gordon - bass, vocals
- Jon Fishman - drums, vocals
