= Paul Reller =

Paul Reller is a composer of contemporary classical music (including a large output of electro-acoustic works) and experimental rock musician. He has been an Associate Professor of Music at the University of South Florida since 1990, where he is the director of SYCOM, the USF School of Music's suite of electronic music studios. Reller earned a BM at the University of Minnesota and Master's degree at Eastman School of Music. He is one of the progenitors of the BONK festival of new music in the Tampa Bay area and has had pieces recorded by Bang on a Can.

His major teachers include Samuel Adler, Dominick Argento, Paul Fetler, David Liptak, Robert Morris, Allan Schindler and Joseph Schwantner. Reller has received many awards for his compositions, among them the Bearns Prize, a BMI award, and two ASCAP awards.

In the 1990s, he was in the band Clang, with, among others, Andrew Irvine.
