= You'll Never Tame Me =

Studio album by GG Allin & The Scumfucs
- Released: Fall 1985
- Recorded: Summer 1985
- Genre: Hardcore punk; garage punk
- Length: 36:17
- Label: Self-released; Black & Blue Records (CD reissue)

GG Allin & The Scumfucs chronology
I Wanna Fuck Your Brains Out (1985)	You'll Never Tame Me (1985)	The Sleaziest, Loosest Sluts (1986)

Alternative cover

You'll Never Tame Me is the third full-length studio album released by American punk rock musician GG Allin, recorded with his backing band the Scumfucs.

Originally released in cassette in 1985, the album was reissued in CD format by Black & Blue Records in 1999.

== Track listing ==
=== Original 1985 Cassette Issue ===
1. "Fuck Women I've Never Had" – 1:35
2. "I Want to Fuck Myself" – 2:52
3. "Needle Up My Cock" – 3:14
4. "Assfuckin, Butt Suckin, Cunt Lickin, Masturbation" – 3:04
5. "You'll Never Tame Me" – 2:44
6. "Torture You" – 3:10
7. "Bite It You Scum" – 3:50
8. "Scumfuc Tradition" – 2:08
9. "Abuse Myself, I Wanna Die" – 4:00
10. "Kill the Children, Save the Food" – 2:43
11. "I Wanna Piss on You" – 2:15
12. "I Fuck the Dead" – 4:32

=== 1999 CD Reissue ===
1. "Fuck Women I've Never Had" – 1:35
2. "I Want to Fuck Myself" – 2:52
3. "Needle Up My Cock" – 3:14
4. "Assfuckin, Butt Suckin, Cunt Lickin, Masturbation" – 3:04
5. "You'll Never Tame Me" – 2:44
6. "Torture You" – 3:10
7. "Bite It You Scum" – 3:50
8. "Scumfuc Tradition" – 2:08
9. "I Fuck the Dead" – 4:32
10. "I Wanna Die" – 3:55
11. "Kill the Children, Save the Food" – 2:43
12. "I Wanna Piss on You" – 2:15
