= Freaks, Faggots, Drunks & Junkies =

Studio album by GG Allin
- Released: April 1988
- Recorded: 1988
- Genre: Hardcore punk; spoken word
- Length: 49:54
- Label: Homestead Records
- Producer: GG Allin and Bulge

GG Allin chronology
You Give Love a Bad Name (1987)	Freaks, Faggots, Drunks & Junkies (1988)	Banned in Boston (1989)

Freaks, Faggots, Drunks & Junkies is the fifth studio album by American punk rock musician GG Allin. A collaboration with backing band Bulge, the LP was first released by Homestead Records in 1988.

== Critical reception ==
Professional ratings
Review scores
Source	Rating
AllMusic	4.5/5 stars

Critic Steve Huey said of the album: "Allin's entire output ranks as perhaps the worst music ever recorded; this is its clearest expression".

== Track listing ==
All songs written and arranged by GG Allin, Johnny X, Charlie Infection and Ed Lynch except where noted.

1. "My Revenge" – 0:43
2. "Dope Money" – 2:46
3. "Be My Fuckin' Whore" – 2:40
4. "Suck My Ass It Smells" – 0:27
5. "Dog Shit" – 2:12
6. "Wild Riding" (GG Allin) – 5:29
7. "Sleeping in My Piss" – 2:06
8. "Anti-Social Masturbator" – 3:12
9. "Last in Line for the Gang Bang" – 2:14
10. "Die When You Die" ("You're Gonna Die" by Destroy All Monsters, new lyrics by GG Allin) – 1:37
11. "Commit Suicide" – 1:53
12. "Crash & Burn" – 3:57
13. "Outlaw Scumfuc" ("Longhaired Redneck" by David Allan Coe, new lyrics by GG Allin) – 2:24
14. "Caroline and Sue" – 2:34
15. "Cunt Sucking Cannibal" (GG Allin, Scott Rag) – 2:44
16. "Family" (GG Allin) – 3:02
17. "Young Little Meat" (GG Allin) – 1:33
18. "I Wanna Kill You" (David Peel, new lyrics by GG Allin) – 3:18
19. "My Bloody Mutilation" – 5:03

== Personnel ==
On all tracks except 6, 16, 17 and 18:

- GG Allin – vocals (credited as playing "microphone and whiskey")
- Johnny X – guitar and backing vocals
- Charlie Infection – drums and backing vocals
- Ed Lynch – bass and backing vocals
- Bill Normal (credited as "Dork") – keyboards on "Crash & Burn", uncredited bass on tracks 7, 9, 14 and 15

On tracks 6, 16, 17 and 18:

- GG Allin – lead vocals and all instruments
- Mark Sheehan, Erik Mercier, Greg Gonorea and Beth Burrow – backing vocals
