= Andrew Irvine (bassist) =

American bassist (born 1969)

Andy Irvine
- Born: April 9, 1969 (age 56)
- Origin: Rochester, New York, U.S.
- Years active: 1990-present

Andrew Thomas Irvine (born April 9, 1969) is an American bassist who has toured with and performed alongside internationally recognized artists. He has been featured in Bass Player magazine. Irvine has toured with over 25 artists nationally and contributed to over 50 successful albums, covering a wide range of styles.

He was raised in Webster, New York, and was active in the Rochester, New York, scene in his early days.

Irvine has performed in a number of bands, including the Tampa, Florida, outfits Beanstalk and Clang, the California group On the One, the Colorado ensembles the Jelly Roll Bakers and Huge in Germany, the band Giant People, and his own outfit the Andrew Irvine Group. He has played alongside GG Allin, Eden Brent, Pee Wee Ellis, Eddie Turner, John Wesley and Lucky Peterson. While with Clang, he recorded an album with Tiny Tim titled Prisoner of Love.

A Warwick artist, Irvine was featured in a March 2009 Bass Player article on soloing, in which the article called him a "soloing sensation." He was featured again in the magazine in August 2010 and twice in 2013 in Bass Guitar magazine (UK).

Irvine founded the Warwick "The Sound of Bass World Clinic Tour" visiting 20 countries around the world.

In 2009, he released a solo album titled Soul Clap and in 2011 another album, Diggin' That Funky Blues.

In 2012, Irvine was asked by Bootsy Collins to become a "professor" at his Funk University. Several of Irvine's lessons and lectures are now part of the Funk-U program, more educational segments are regularly being filmed in Los Angeles for ongoing use at Funk U.

In July 2013, Irvine released his third solo album, The Way I Like It. A complete departure from his previously released albums, it is a solo bass guitar feature album with a sparse and ambient production.

"I set out to record and release a bass guitar feature album with a certain and strict criteria in mind, it had to sound like music and be a relaxed enjoyable listen from the beginning of the album to the end. I composed all the music to be melody and rhythm oriented, and to be "listenable" I did not want to create an album which displays tricky and impressive techniques, more so to provide a soulful collection of songs that might transport the listener to a pleasant place of relaxation. I'm proud of the finished work, and in ways it is my best to date" -Andy Irvine
