= Todd Phillips =

American filmmaker (born 1970)

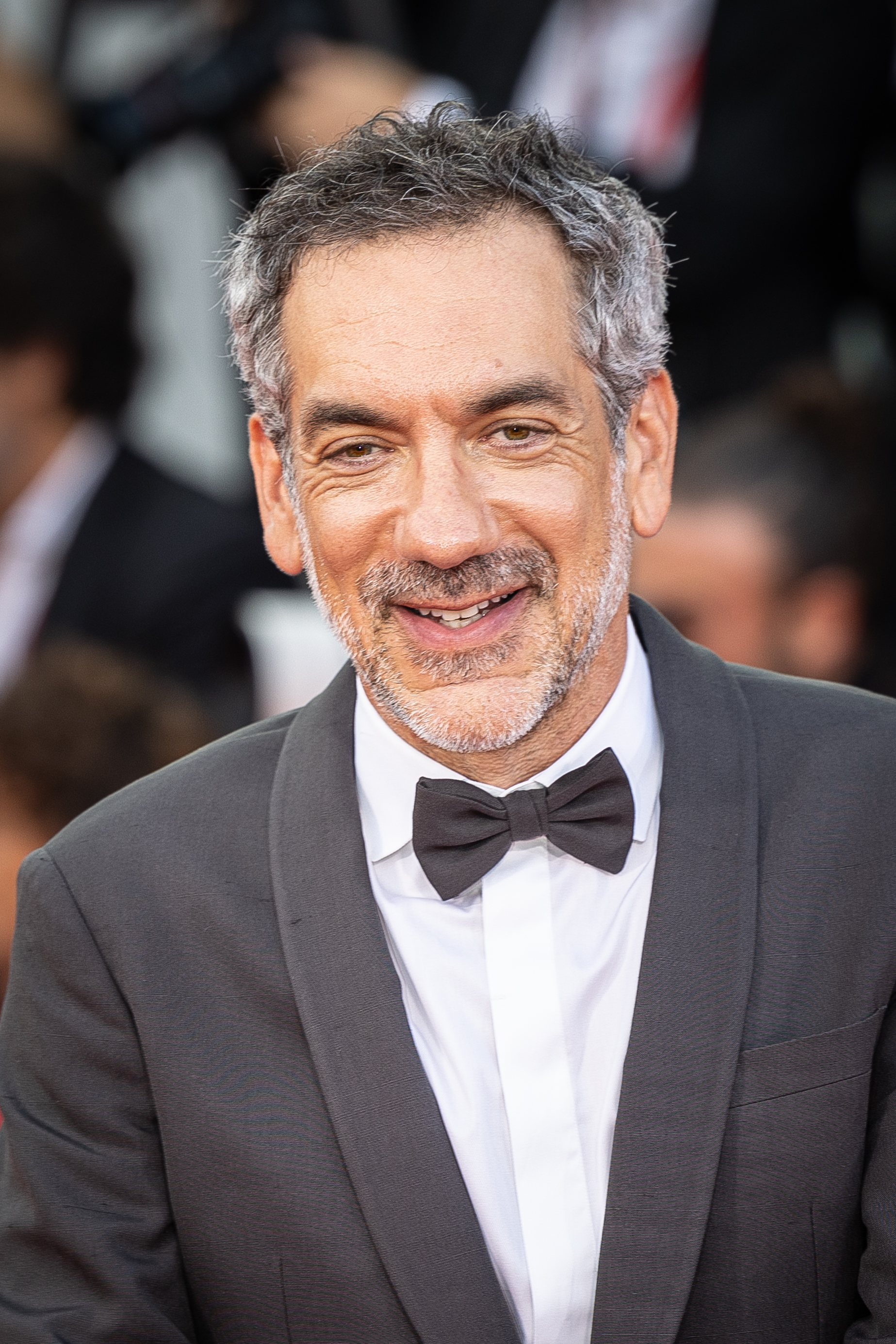
- Phillips in 2024
- Born: Todd Philip Bunzl; December 20, 1970 (age 55); Brooklyn, New York City, U.S.
- Occupations: Film director; producer; screenwriter
- Years active: 1993–present

Todd Phillips (born Todd Philip Bunzl, December 20, 1970) is an American filmmaker. He began his career in 1993 and directed films in the 2000s such as Road Trip, Old School, Starsky & Hutch, and School for Scoundrels. He came to wider prominence in the early 2010s for directing The Hangover film series. In 2019, Phillips co-wrote and directed the psychological thriller film Joker, based on the DC Comics character of the same name, which premiered at the 76th Venice International Film Festival where it received the top prize, the Golden Lion. Joker went on to earn Phillips three Academy Award nominations for Best Picture, Best Director, and Best Adapted Screenplay, with his co-writer Scott Silver, his second, third, and fourth Academy Award nominations after also being nominated for Best Adapted Screenplay for Borat at the 79th Academy Awards.

== Early life ==
Phillips was born in Brooklyn, New York City, to a Jewish family. He was raised in Dix Hills, New York, on Long Island. He attended New York University Film School, but dropped out because he could not afford to complete his first film and pay tuition simultaneously. Around that time, he worked at Kim's Video and Music.

Phillips appeared as one of the drivers in the first season of the HBO hidden camera docu-series Taxicab Confessions. In a New York Times profile, Phillips said he had gotten in trouble for shoplifting as a young man.

== Career ==
Phillips's first documentary film, Hated: GG Allin and the Murder Junkies, centered on the life and death of controversial punk rocker GG Allin, while a junior at NYU. It went on to become one of the highest grossing student films at the time, even getting a limited theatrical release. Phillips wrote a letter to convicted serial killer John Wayne Gacy, an acquaintance of Allin, asking if he could paint a movie poster for the film. Phillips stated that "Gacy is really the executive producer" of the film, having raised $10,000 from selling replicas of his artwork.

Next, he co-directed with then-partner Andrew Gurland Frat House, a second documentary about college fraternities; it premiered at the 1998 Sundance Film Festival and won the Grand Jury Prize for documentary features. It was produced by HBO, but never aired on its channel because some of the film's participants claimed their activities onscreen were staged reenactments.

His third documentary Bittersweet Motel centered on the jam band Phish, covering its summer and fall 1997 tours, plus footage from their 1998 spring tour of Europe. It ends at The Great Went, a two-day festival held in upstate Maine which attracted 70,000 people. While at Sundance with Frat House, Phillips met director-producer Ivan Reitman who led Phillips into writing and directing his comedy films, Road Trip and Old School, for Reitman's Montecito Picture Company.

Phillips also wrote and directed the 2004 film Starsky & Hutch starring Ben Stiller and Owen Wilson, as well as the 2006 film School for Scoundrels, starring Billy Bob Thornton and Jon Heder. In 2005, Details Magazine cited Judd Apatow, Adam McKay and Phillips as "The Frat Packagers". He worked on the satirical comedy Borat (2006), but he resigned his position as a director in early 2005, due to creative differences. Nevertheless, he was nominated for an Academy Award for Best Adapted Screenplay for his role in fashioning the story.

After establishing Green Hat Films in 2008, Phillips directed and produced The Hangover. Made for a reported $35 million, it went on to become the highest-grossing R-rated comedy up to that time. Its worldwide gross stood at $480 million on February 3, 2012. The film went on to win the Golden Globe for Best Picture (Musical or Comedy). It also won Best Comedy at the 2009 Broadcast Film Critics Awards. Phillips took almost no up-front salary in exchange for a large share of the film's profits, and has said that the movie's enormous success, combined with his deal, makes it "my Star Wars". After a worldwide gross of $467 million, his share in the film made Phillips around $50 million.

In 2010, Phillips directed, produced and co-wrote the comedy Due Date, which starred Robert Downey Jr. and Zach Galifianakis. It was a box office success, grossing $211,780,324 worldwide.

In the fall of 2010, production on The Hangover Part II began in Bangkok, Thailand that Phillips directed, produced and co-wrote. The film shot for 63 days and broke various records upon its release on May 26, 2011. With the film debuting at midnight with showings in 2,600 theaters, the film earned $10.4 million, breaking the record for the biggest midnight opening for an R-rated film. The Hangover Part II went on to accrue a launch day total of $31.6 million; nearly doubling The Hangover's Friday launch opening ($16.7 million). This amount broke two further records; the highest-grossing opening day for a live-action comedy and the highest-grossing opening day for an R-rated comedy film, replacing Sex and the City ($26.7 million). The three-day opening weekend accumulated $85,946,294—an average of $23,923 per theater—becoming the highest grossing opening weekend for a comedy film, replacing The Simpsons Movie ($74 million). For the Memorial Day four-day weekend, the film amassed $103.4 million to become the fourth-highest-grossing Memorial Day weekend opening. Finally, the film's worldwide gross of $581,464,305 beat the previous R-rated comedy record holder The Hangover to become the highest-grossing R-rated comedy film of all time (now surpassed by both Deadpool movies).

He returned to direct, write, and produce The Hangover Part III, which was released in 2013. It grossed over $300 million, pushing The Hangover Trilogy's total box office gross to $1.4 billion.

In 2016, following the successes of The Hangover trilogy, Phillips directed, produced, and co-wrote the crime film War Dogs, starring Jonah Hill and Miles Teller.

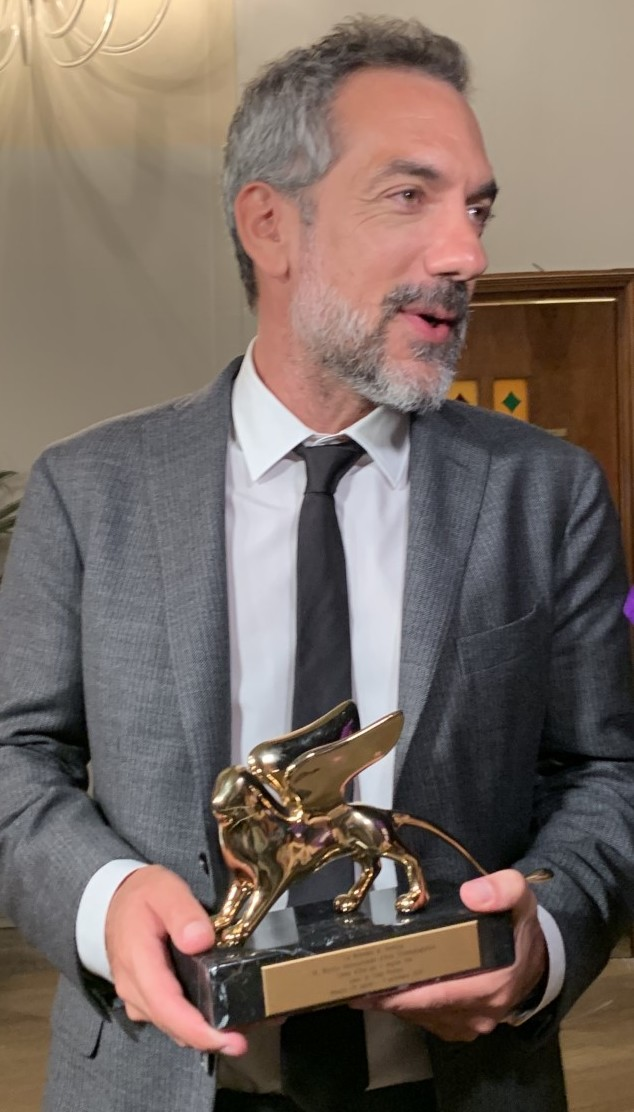
Phillips winning the Golden Lion for the film Joker at the 76th Venice Film Festival

In 2019, Phillips directed, co-wrote, and co-produced an origin story film based on DC Comics' supervillain the Joker, Joker (2019). The script, set in 1981, was co-written by Scott Silver, and the film starred Joaquin Phoenix in the title role. It premiered at the 76th Venice International Film Festival and was released in October 2019. Its sequel, Joker: Folie a Deux, added Lady Gaga as Harley Quinn; released in 2024, the film was also directed, co-written, and co-produced by Phillips. The film was panned by critics and audiences and underperformed at the box-office. According to one source, after Joker: Folie à Deux was released, Phillips spent the weekend on his ranch in seclusion.

== Personal beliefs ==
When asked in a 2014 interview by the BBC if he believes in God, Phillips replied: "Personally I don't. But I believe there's a higher power, a collective energy in people that you might say is God."

Phillips said in 2019, in the aftermath of his dark drama Joker release, that he had stopped making comedy films because of the backlash of "woke culture", saying: "Go try to be funny nowadays... There were articles written about why comedies don't work anymore – I'll tell you why, because all the fucking funny guys are like, 'Fuck this shit, because I don't want to offend you'. It's hard to argue with 30 million people on Twitter."

== Filmography ==
=== Film ===
Documentary film

Year	Title	Director	Producer	Writer	Himself	Notes
1993	Hated: GG Allin and the Murder Junkies	Yes	Yes	Yes	No	
1998	Frat House	Yes	Yes	No	Yes	Co-directed with Andrew Gurland
2000	Bittersweet Motel	Yes	Yes	Yes	Yes	

Feature film

Year	Title	Director	Writer	Producer
2000	Road Trip	Yes	Yes	No
2003	Old School	Yes	Yes	Yes
2004	Starsky & Hutch	Yes	Yes	No
2006	Borat	No (Note: Principal photography on Borat was underway in January 2005, with Phillips as the director. Lead actor Sacha Baron Cohen caused a near riot while filming a rodeo scene. Phillips left production and replaced with Larry Charles after filming the scene due to creative differences with Baron Cohen, but was given a "story by" credit in the finished film.)	Story	No
2006	All the King's Men	No	No	Executive
2006	School for Scoundrels	Yes	Yes	Yes
2009	The Hangover	Yes	No	Yes
2010	Due Date	Yes	Yes	Yes
2011	The Hangover Part II	Yes	Yes	Yes
2012	Project X	No	No	Yes
2013	The Hangover Part III	Yes	Yes	Yes
2016	War Dogs	Yes	Yes	Yes
2018	A Star Is Born	No	No	Yes
2019	Joker	Yes	Yes	Yes
2024	Joker: Folie à Deux	Yes	Yes	Yes

Acting credits

Year	Title	Role
2000	Road Trip	Foot Lover
2003	Old School	Gang Bang Guy
2009	The Hangover	Mr. Creepy
2010	Due Date	Barry
2013	The Hangover Part III	Mr. Creepy

=== Television ===
Year	Title	Director	Producer	Notes
1997	Taxicab Confessions	No	Yes	Field producer, 1 episode
2008	The More Things Change...	Yes	Executive	TV movie
2012	Matthew Broderick's Day Off	Yes	Yes	Commercial for Honda
2015–2016	Limitless	No	Executive	19 episodes

== Awards and nominations ==
Year	Association	Category	Work	Result
1994	New Orleans Film Festival	Best Documentary Film	Hated: GG Allin and the Murder Junkies	Won
1998	San Francisco International Film Festival	Certificate of Merit	Frat House	Won
1998	Sundance Film Festival	Grand Jury Prize Documentary	Frat House	Won
2007	Writers Guild of America Award	Best Adapted Screenplay	Borat	Nominated
2007	Academy Award	Best Adapted Screenplay	Borat	Nominated
2009	Golden Globe Award	Best Motion Picture – Musical or Comedy	The Hangover	Won
2009	British Comedy Award	Best Comedy Film	The Hangover	Nominated
2010	ShoWest Convention	Director of the Year		Won
2018	Awards Circuit Community Award	Best Motion Picture	A Star Is Born	Won
2019	Latino Entertainment Journalists Association	Best Picture	A Star Is Born	Won
2019	Music City Film Critics' Association	Jim Ridley Award	A Star Is Born	Won
2019	Online Film & Television Association	Best Picture	A Star Is Born	Won
2019	Venice International Film Festival	Golden Lion	Joker	Won
2020	Golden Globe Award	Best Motion Picture – Drama	Joker	Nominated
2020	Golden Globe Award	Best Director	Joker	Nominated
2020	Critics' Choice Movie Award	Best Picture	Joker	Nominated
2020	Critics' Choice Movie Award	Best Adapted Screenplay	Joker	Nominated
2020	Producers Guild of America Award	Best Theatrical Motion Picture	Joker	Nominated
2020	Writers Guild of America Award	Best Adapted Screenplay	Joker	Nominated
2020	British Academy Film Award	Best Film	Joker	Nominated
2020	British Academy Film Award	Best Director	Joker	Nominated
2020	British Academy Film Award	Best Adapted Screenplay	Joker	Nominated
2020	Academy Award	Best Picture	Joker	Nominated
2020	Academy Award	Best Director	Joker	Nominated
2020	Academy Award	Best Adapted Screenplay	Joker	Nominated
2024	Venice International Film Festival	Golden Lion	Joker: Folie à Deux	Nominated
2025	Golden Raspberry Awards	Worst Picture	Joker: Folie à Deux	Nominated
2025	Golden Raspberry Awards	Worst Director	Joker: Folie à Deux	Nominated
2025	Golden Raspberry Awards	Worst Screenplay	Joker: Folie à Deux	Nominated
