= Eat My Fuc =

Studio album by GG Allin & The Scumfucs
- Released: April 1984
- Recorded: 1983–84
- Genre: Garage punk; hardcore punk; lo-fi
- Length: ~40:00
- Label: Blood; Black & Blue (1989 reissue)
- Producer: Dick Urine

GG Allin & The Scumfucs chronology
No Rules (1982)	Eat My Fuc (1984)	I Wanna Fuck Your Brains Out (1985)

Professional ratings
Review scores
Source	Rating
Allmusic	2/5 stars

Eat My Fuc is the second full-length studio album by American punk rock musician GG Allin, released in 1984 on Blood Records. Side one (the first five tracks) were recorded and initially released in 1983 as a single.

== Track listing ==
1. "Hard Candy Cock"
2. "Out for Blood"
3. "I Don't Give a Shit"
4. "Drink, Fight, and Fuck"
5. "Convulsions"
6. "I Wanna Fuck Your Brains Out" (1989 reissue)
7. "I'm Gonna Rape You" (1989 reissue)
8. "Teacher's Pet" (1989 reissue)
9. "Fuckin' the Dog"
10. "Cock on the Loose"
11. "Clit Licker"
12. "God of Fire in Hell"
13. "Blow Jobs" ("She Got A Nose Job" Mad Magazine novelty song by Mike Russo, Jeanne Hayes, and The Dellwoods, new filthy lyrics by GG Allin)
14. Live at the A7 Club 4/83 ("You Hate Me and I Hate You"/"No Rules")
