= Hated: GG Allin and the Murder Junkies =

1993 American film

- Directed by: Todd Phillips
- Produced by: Todd Phillips
- Starring: GG Allin; Merle Allin; Donald "Dino Sex" Sachs; Shireen Kadivar; Dee Dee Ramone; Geraldo Rivera; Unk
- Music by: GG Allin
- Distributed by: Skinny Nervous Guy Prod.
- Release date: February 1993
- Running time: 53 minutes
- Country: United States
- Language: English
- Budget: $12,000

Hated: GG Allin and the Murder Junkies is a 1993 American documentary film produced and directed by Todd Phillips. The film is about the life of GG Allin, a punk rock musician who was infamous for extreme behavior (violence, obscenity, drug abuse) and his stage shows becoming confrontational events involving indecent exposure (stripping and performing naked was one of Allin's most common rituals), onstage defecation and coprophagia, physical assault (both on and by Allin), and obscene language. The filmmakers shot additional material on his death (from a heroin overdose during post-production) for inclusion in the film. The film is Phillips' directorial debut, who was a junior at New York University during production.

As of 2017, the film has a 63% score on the Rotten Tomatoes website based on eight reviews.

== Plot ==
Hated includes concert and rehearsal footage as well as interviews with Allin, fellow band members, friends, detractors, and dedicated fans. Later, Allin discusses the earliest years of his childhood in rural New Hampshire, and how his father tried to encourage his family to assist him in a mass suicide. Footage of his controversial performances include a violent confrontation with audience members at a spoken word appearance at New York University (where director Phillips was a student), as well as scenes of Allin defecating during shows, mutilating himself and assaulting concertgoers at a rock club in East Village, Manhattan.

Quieter moments are also included, such as Allin offstage playing an acoustic version of Warren Zevon's "Carmelita". Also included is footage of Allin cavorting at a party, and his appearance on Geraldo Rivera's talk show.

After the credits, his funeral and corpse are also briefly included.

== Reception ==
=== Reaction from GG Allin ===
GG Allin attended a screening of Hated just days before his death. While the film was being shown, a heavily intoxicated Allin threw several beer bottles at the movie screen, one of which injured a woman. As a result, the screening was halted, and Allin fled just before police arrived. Although he never saw the complete film, Allin was happy with the light in which Todd Phillips had portrayed him, and gave the director positive feedback and a hug the day after the screening.

=== Reviews ===
Hated received positive reviews from Revolver magazine, Combustible Celluloid, eFilmCritic.com, DVDTalk, Digitally Obsessed, and Monsters at Play.

== Home media ==
Hated was released on DVD in December 1999 that features the last show Allin performed in New York City on the evening before his death, the band rehearsal session before it and the ensuing carnage afterward. It was re-released with new footage in 2007. The first 5,000 copies came with free temporary tattoos based on some of Allin's real tattoos, and a mail-in offer for a poster featuring the artwork of Allin painted by serial killer and acquaintance John Wayne Gacy. A bonus feature on the region 1 DVD shows a still of Allin lying in his coffin. He is dressed in a jacket and jock strap.

== Soundtrack ==
Hated

Soundtrack album by GG Allin
- Released: 1993
- Recorded: Various Locations
- Genres: Punk rock, hardcore punk, outlaw country
- Length: 34:01

Professional ratings
Review scores
Source	Rating
AllMusic	4.5/5 stars

All songs by GG Allin except for "Carmelita" by Warren Zevon

No.	Title	Length
1.	"Die When You Die"	1:59
2.	"Bite It You Scum"	3:43
3.	"Carmelita"	3:24
4.	"Snakeman's Dance"	3:21
5.	"Young Little Meat"	1:55
6.	"Fuck Authority"	3:38
7.	"Gypsy Motherfucker"	3:52
8.	"Suck My Ass It Smells"	1:00
9.	"Outlaw Scumfuc"	2:36
10.	"Cunt Sucking Cannibal"	3:16
11.	"I Wanna Kill You"	3:20
12.	"When I Die"	4:07
