= Swiss Fort Knox =

Coordinates: 46°29′08″N 7°15′15″E

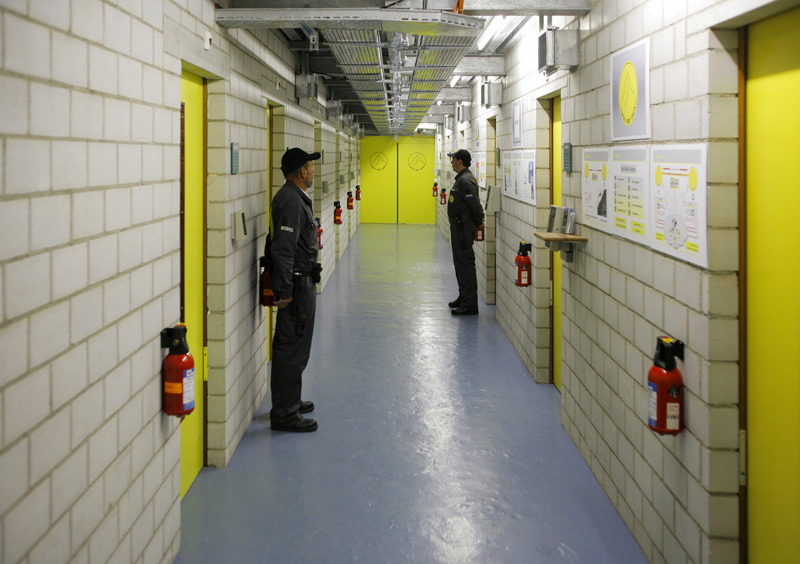
Workers guarding the Swiss Fort Knox

Swiss Fort Knox are two highly secure data centers under the Swiss Alps that are designed to provide "long-term access to our digital cultural and scientific assets".
