= Banned in Boston (GG Allin album) =

Compilation album by GG Allin & The Jabbers
- Released: February 1989
- Recorded: 1978–c. Fall 1984
- Genre: Punk rock; garage punk; pop-punk; hardcore punk
- Length: 72:31
- Label: Black & Blue Records
- Producer: Peter Yarmouth

GG Allin & The Jabbers chronology
Freaks, Faggots, Drunks and Junkies (1988)	Banned in Boston (1989)	The Suicide Sessions (1989)

Alternative cover

Professional ratings
Review scores
Source	Rating
AllMusic	4.5/5 stars

Banned in Boston is a compilation CD by American punk rock musician GG Allin, released by Black & Blue Records. Although it was compiled and sent to the manufacturing plant in the winter of 1988 and gives a copyright date of that year, it was released in 1989. It was also the first GG Allin title to be released on compact disc. The release on CD included additional material not on the vinyl version Black & Blue Records released.

The CD was compiled by Black and Blue Records owner Peter Yarmouth with cooperation from GG Allin, since the two previous 7" releases had started to garner interest after the infamous Cat Club show in NYC and all the press in Village Voice, Flipside and other punk rock fanzines. The other version of the album is a compilation of all of GG Allin recordings with the Jabbers, released in 1990.

== Track listing ==
1. Dead or Alive
2. Interview (September 9, 1981)
3. Live Boston (September 9, 1981)
  1. You Hate Me and I Hate You
  2. Gimme Some Head
  3. Don't Talk to Me
  4. Automatic
  5. Nuke Attack
  6. Bored to Death
  7. Assface
4. Interview (September 9, 1981)
5. Live Fast Die Fast
6. Livin' Like an Animal
7. Loudenbomber
8. I Need Adventure
9. NYC Tonite
10. No Rules
11. A Fuckup
12. Gimme Some Head
13. You Hate Me and I Hate You
14. Bored to Death
15. Beat Beat Beat
16. One Man Army
17. Assface
18. Cheri Love Affair
19. Automatic
20. I Need Adventure (1980 Version)
21. Don't Talk to Me
22. Unpredictable
23. Radio Interview (unlisted on the CD tray liner)

== Alternate track listing ==
1. You Hate Me and I Hate You
2. Fuckup
3. No Rules
4. Bored To Death
5. Beat Beat Beat
6. One Man Army
7. Assface
8. Cheri Love Affair
9. Automatic
10. I Need Adventure
11. Don't Talk To Me
12. Unpredictable
13. Up Against The Wall
14. Gimmie Some Head
15. NYC Tonight
16. Dead Or Alive
17. Living Like an Animal
