= You Give Love a Bad Name (album) =

Studio album by GG Allin & The Holy Men
- Released: 1987
- Recorded: May 18, 1987 (original LP); March 4 and July 7, 1991 (CD bonus tracks)
- Genre: Punk rock; hardcore punk
- Length: 31:32 (original LP); 60:22 (CD reissue)
- Label: Homestead Records (original LP); Awareness Records (CD reissue)
- Producer: GG Allin & The Holy Men

GG Allin & The Holy Men chronology
Hated in the Nation (1987)	You Give Love a Bad Name (1987)	Freaks, Faggots, Drunks and Junkies (1988)

Professional ratings
Review scores
Source	Rating
AllMusic	2/5 stars

You Give Love a Bad Name is the fourth studio album released by American punk rock musician GG Allin, recorded with his backing band the Holy Men.

== Track listing ==
=== Original 1987 LP ===
All songs written by G.G. Allin except where noted.

==== Side one ====
1. "Swank Fuckin'" (G.G. Allin, Mike Edison) - 2:53
2. "Bloody Mary's Bloody Cunt" (G.G. Allin, Mike Edison) - 3:26
3. "Tough Fuckin' Shit" - 2:08
4. "I'm a Rapest" - 4:27
5. "Suck Dog" (G.G. Allin, Greg Bullock) - 2:50

==== Side two ====
1. "Teenage Twats" (G.G. Allin, Gerald Cosloy) - 3:29
2. "Beer Picnic" (Bad Tuna Experience) - 4:22
3. "Stink Finger Clit" (G.G. Allin, Gerald Cosloy) - 3:04
4. "Scars on My Body - Scabs on My Dick" (G.G. Allin, Bloody F. Mess, Gerald Cosloy) - 2:30
5. "Garbage Dump" (Charles Manson) - 2:23

=== CD reissue bonus tracks ===
1. "Watch Me Kill the Boston Girl" - 1:00
2. "Castration Crucifixion" - 2:06
3. "Snakeman's Dance" - 3:04
4. "Slaughterhouse Deathcamp" - 1:15
5. "Feces and Blood" - 3:41
6. "Master Daddy" - 1:45
7. "Interview from Prison" - 15:58

== Personnel ==
- GG Allin - vocals, engineer, voices, producer
- Gerard Cosloy - guitar, editing, backing vocals, remixing, sequencing, mixing
- Mike Kirkland - bass
- Greg Van Voorst - percussion, backing vocals
- Greg Bullock - guitar, backing vocals
- Mike "Machine Gun" Edison - drums, backing vocals
- Jaques Kralian - engineer
- Wharton Tiers - sequencing
- Bloody F. Mess - liner notes
- Georgia Hubley - cover layout
