= Merle Allin =

American bassist (born 1955)

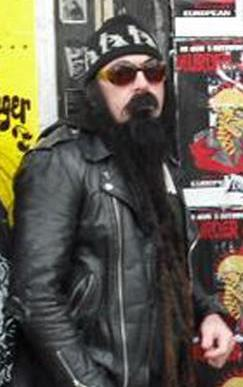
- Allin in 2008

Background information
- Born: Merle Colby Allin Jr. April 9, 1955 (age 71); Lancaster, New Hampshire, U.S.
- Genres: Punk rock
- Occupation: Musician
- Years active: 1974–present
- Labels: Homestead; Alive/BOMP!
- Website: ggallin.com

Merle Colby Allin Jr. (born April 9, 1955) is an American bass guitarist. He is the elder brother of the late punk rock vocalist GG Allin.

Allin played electric bass for three groups that featured GG Allin: Malpractice, The AIDS Brigade and the third version of The Murder Junkies; he currently continues the latter, his brother's final backing band, with original drummer Donald ("Dino Sex") Sachs, and several younger members.

Allin is featured extensively in the documentary film Hated: GG Allin and the Murder Junkies, by filmmaker Todd Phillips.

Allin was also bass player in late 70s Boston punk group Thrills (a.k.a. City Thrills), who released several singles and were the subject of a later CD discography. He subsequently joined the band Cheater Slicks, and played bass guitar on their debut album On Your Knees.

Allin also appears in the full-length Allin family documentary GG Allin: All in the Family (2018), directed by Sami Saif.

Outside of his work as a musician, Allin is a noted collector of serial killer memorabilia and was featured in three installments of Soft White Underbelly.
