= The Jabbers =

American punk rock band

- Origin: United States
- Genres: Punk rock
- Years active: 1977–1984; 2003–present
- Labels: Homestead
- Members: Alan Chapple; Chris Lamy; Wimpy Rutherford; Harlan Miller
- Past members: GG Allin; Merle Allin; Rob Basso; Michael O'Donnell; Steve Spenard
- Website: thejabbers.com

The Jabbers are an American punk rock band. Perhaps best known for having GG Allin as the frontman at the beginning of his career in the late 1970s to early 1980s, many of his most well-known songs were recorded with the band, such as "Don't Talk to Me" and "Bored to Death".

One review of the only Jabbers album with Allin, Always Was, Is and Always Shall Be, states: "Amazingly enough, the violent hatred, sexual and psychological degradation, and staggering stupidity only hint at the heights (or depths) Allin would reach later."

Embryonic versions of the band appeared as early as 1977, focused around Allin (singing and occasionally playing drums), his brother Merle Allin on bass, and various local guitarists. By 1979, the live group featured bassist Alan Chapple and guitarist Rob Basso; guitarist Chris Lamy joined in 1980, and Michael O'Donnell became the group's drummer in 1983. The group disbanded in May 1984, and Allin next led The Scumfucs. Their complete recordings with Allin are on the Banned in Boston compilation.

In 2003, Chapple, Lamy, and O'Donnell reformed the band with new singer Wimpy Rutherford and lead guitarist Harlan Miller (both ex-members of the pop punk group The Queers). They released an album entitled American Standard in 2005 on Steel Cage Records.

== Discography ==
=== Studio albums ===
as GG Allin

Year	Album	Label	Format
1980	Always Was, Is and Always Shall Be	Orange Records	LP

as The Jabbers

Year	Album	Label	Format
2005	American Standard	Steel Cage Records	CD

=== Live albums ===
as GG Allin & The Jabbers

Year	Album	Label	Format
1981	Band in Boston	No Label	Cassette
1982	Tasteless Animal Noise	No Label	Cassette
1982	Bored Again	No Label	Cassette
1983	Live at the A7 Club	No Label	Cassette

=== Compilation albums ===
as GG Allin & The Jabbers

Year	Album	Label	Format
1990	Banned in Boston	Black & Blue Records	CD

=== Extended plays ===
as GG Allin

Year	Album	Label	Format
1982	You Hate Me & I Hate You	Orange Records	CD
1982	No Rules	Orange Records	7"

as GG Allin & The Jabbers

Year	Album	Label	Format
1979	Bored to Death	Blood Records	CD

as The Jabbers

Year	Album	Label	Format
2005	Badass	Blood Records	CD

=== Singles ===
as GG Allin & The Jabbers

Year	Single	Label	Format
1980	"Cheri Love Affair"	Destiny Records	7"
