= GG Allin =

American punk rock musician (1956–1993)

- GG Allin, c. 1991

Background information
- Also known as: Kevin Michael Allin
- Born: Jesus Christ Allin; August 29, 1956; Lancaster, New Hampshire, U.S.
- Died: June 28, 1993 (aged 36) New York City, U.S.
- Genre: Punk rock
- Occupations: Musician; songwriter; record producer
- Instruments: Vocals; drums; guitar; bass
- Years active: 1974–1993
- Labels: Mountain; Ax/tion; Blood; Orange; ROIR; Black and Blue; Homestead; Awareness; Alive/BOMP!; Jive
- Formerly of: The Jabbers; Antiseen; David Peel; the Murder Junkies
- Website: ggallin.com

Kevin Michael "GG" Allin (born Jesus Christ Allin; August 29, 1956 – June 28, 1993) was an American punk rock musician who performed and recorded with many groups during his career. His live performances often featured transgressive acts, including self-mutilation, defecating on stage, and assaulting audience members, for which he was arrested and imprisoned on multiple occasions. AllMusic called him "the most spectacular degenerate in rock n' roll history", while G4TV's That's Tough placed him second on their list of "toughest rock stars in the world".

Known more for his notorious stage antics than his music, Allin recorded prolifically, not only in the punk rock genre, but also in spoken word, country, and more traditional-style rock. His lyrics often expressed themes of violence and misanthropy.

Allin's music was often poorly recorded and produced, given limited distribution, and met with mostly negative reviews from critics, although he maintained a cult following throughout and after his career. Allin promised for several years that he would commit suicide on stage during one of his concerts, but he instead died from a drug overdose on June 28, 1993, at age 36.

== Early life ==
Allin was born Jesus Christ Allin at Weeks Memorial Hospital in Lancaster, New Hampshire, the younger of two sons born to Merle Colby Allin Sr. (1923–2001) and Arleta Gunther (1936–2019). He was given this name because his father told his wife that Jesus Christ had visited him, and told him that his newborn son would be a great man in the vein of the Messiah. During early childhood, Allin's older brother Merle Jr. was unable to pronounce "Jesus" properly and called him "Jeje", which became "GG".

Allin's family lived in a log cabin with no running water or electricity in Groveton, New Hampshire. His father was an abusive religious fanatic who threatened his family with death, digging graves in their cellar and threatening to fill them in the near future. In an essay titled "The First Ten Years", Allin wrote that Merle Sr. wanted to kill his family in a murder–suicide. He "despised pleasure" and allowed his family "very little contact with others". They lived a "primitive existence" and "were more like prisoners than a family". Allin also stated that his mother attempted to escape before she filed for divorce, but Merle Sr. thwarted the attempt by kidnapping Allin. Allin said that he was glad to experience such an upbringing, and that it "made [him] a warrior soul at an early age."

In 1961, Arleta filed for divorce from Merle Sr., as his mental instability was worsening. Allin and his brother were from that time raised by their mother and stepfather, and settled in East St. Johnsbury, Vermont, in 1966. Allin, a poor student, was placed in special education classes and required to repeat the third grade. According to his older brother, he experienced bullying by fellow students for nonconformity. In his second year of high school, he began attending school cross-dressed, which he said was inspired by the New York Dolls. When asked about his childhood, Allin said that it was "very chaotic. Full of chances and dangers. We sold drugs, stole, broke into houses, cars. Did whatever we wanted to for the most part – including all the bands we played in. People even hated us back then."

== Recording career ==
=== Early years ===
Allin's first introduction to music came through country artists such as Johnny Cash, Johnny Horton, Hank Williams, Willie Nelson and Merle Haggard, as his parents owned their records.

Allin's earliest musical influences were 1960s British Invasion bands including Mott the Hoople and the Dave Clark Five. In the early 1970s, Alice Cooper became an important influence on Allin. Allin's earliest recorded musical endeavors were as a drummer. He also wrote most of his songs on an acoustic guitar. In his mid-teens, he and his older brother Merle, who plays bass guitar, formed their first band, Little Sister's Date, which lasted a little over a year. The group covered songs by Aerosmith, Kiss, and other popular rock bands of the time period. Both Allin and Merle gained a strong interest in punk rock. The MC5 and the Stooges were major influences on Allin.

He graduated from Concord High School in Concord, Vermont, in 1975, and shortly after formed the band Malpractice with Merle, local musician Jeff Penney, and high school friend Brian Demurs. Allin played the drums for Malpractice until the band separated in 1977.

From September 1977 to April 1984, he fronted the Jabbers. Allin's 1980 debut album was Always Was, Is and Always Shall Be for Orange Records. In addition to singing, he played drums on most tracks. The album was reissued for the first time on CD in 1995 by the Halycon imprint. At one point, industry veteran and the Dead Boys producer Genya Ravan served as his manager. Tension within the Jabbers mounted as Allin grew uncontrollable, uncompromising, and vicious. The Jabbers disbanded in the spring of 1984. Their second-to-last show was opening for Charged GBH.

=== Mid-period and more extreme live performances ===
Allin first defecated onstage in 1985 at a show at the Creve Coeur, Illinois VFW building near Peoria. According to fellow performer Bloody Mess, "I was with him when he bought the Ex-Lax. Unfortunately, he ate it hours before the show, so he constantly had to hold it in or he would've shit before he got onstage ... After he shit onstage, complete chaos broke out in the hall ... All of the old men in charge of the hall went fucking nuts!.. Hundreds of confused punk kids were flipping out, running out the door, because the smell was incredible." Defecation became a regular part of his stage act.

Allin idolized country music legend Hank Williams and saw himself as a kindred spirit. Both were relative loners and outsiders, both were habitual users of intoxicants, both lived with few (if any) possessions, and both traveled the country relentlessly. Allin's acoustic output, documented on the EP The Troubled Troubador, was heavily influenced by Williams. He recorded his own rewrites of Hank Williams Jr.'s "Family Tradition" and David Allan Coe's "Longhaired Redneck", calling his own versions "Scumfuc Tradition" and "Outlaw Scumfuc", respectively. Later, Allin also released another country album, Carnival of Excess, his most refined set of recordings.

Another attraction to Allin performances was his continual threats of suicide. In 1989, Allin wrote to Maximum RocknRoll stating that he would commit suicide on stage on Halloween 1989. However, he was in jail when that day came. He continued his threat each following year but ended up imprisoned each following Halloween. When asked why he did not follow through with his threats, Allin stated, "With GG, you don't get what you expect—you get what you deserve." He also stated that suicide should only be done when one had reached one's peak, meeting the afterlife at one's strongest point and not at one's weakest.

In June 1993, Allin made an appearance on The Jane Whitney Show. This interview is infamous for being his last, and for his aggression toward the audience. Allin openly stated that he would commit suicide and take his fans with him. When questioned by Whitney, he clarified that he would make them commit suicide as well or he would kill them. Allin also stated that, at 35, he could have sex with 12-, 13- and 16-year-old girls, boys, and animals, and claimed that he raped both women and men at his concerts.

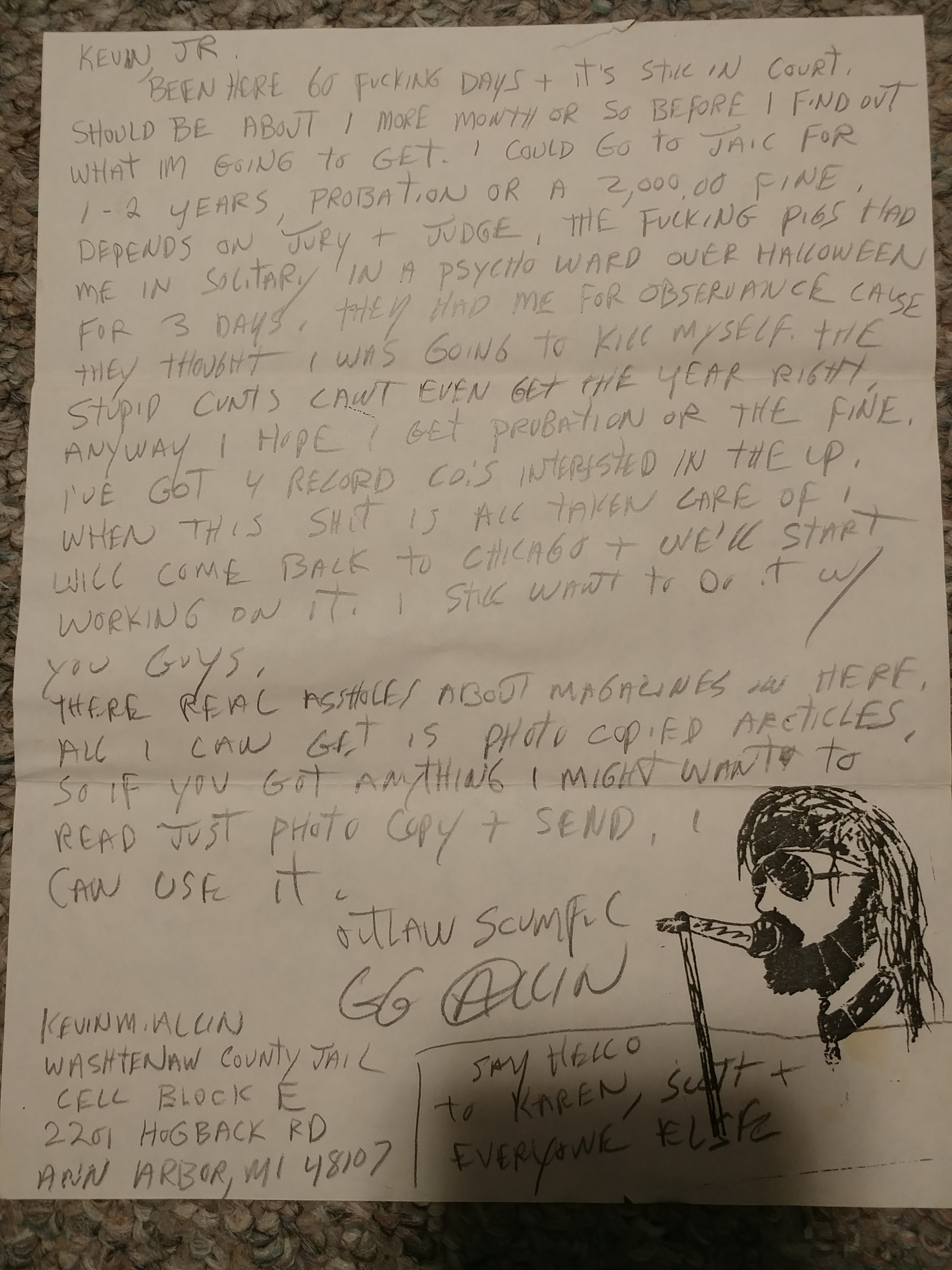
Letter from November 1989

=== 1989 trial and imprisonment ===
In late 1989, Allin was arrested and charged with "assault with intent to do great bodily harm less than murder" of a female acquaintance in Ann Arbor, Michigan. Allin initially denied the charges, claiming that the woman was a willing participant in their sexual activities. Allin admitted to cutting her, burning her, and drinking her blood, but insisted that she did the same thing to him. Allin also claimed that inconsistencies in the woman's statements to authorities supported his assertions. The judge in the case agreed there were substantial inconsistencies in the woman's account. Ultimately, however, Allin plea bargained to the reduced charge of felonious assault, and he was imprisoned from December 25, 1989, to March 26, 1991. It was during this time in prison that Allin began feeling re-energized about his life and "mission". He wrote The GG Allin Manifesto during this period.

=== Final days ===
Allin's growing notoriety led to appearances on various television shows: Geraldo, The Jerry Springer Show and The Jane Whitney Show. At the time of his death, Allin was making plans for a spoken-word album. He also mentioned a somewhat unlikely European tour, enthusiastically talking about it in the hours before his death.

== Personal life ==
=== Family and relationships ===
GG Allin married Sandra Farrow on October 6, 1978. They divorced in 1985.

In the mid-1980s, Allin became involved with a teenage girl from Garland, Texas named Tracy Deneault. They had a daughter who chose to distance herself from her family. Allin and Tracey Deneault never married. At the time of his death, Allin's partner was Liz Mankowski. They appeared together on The Jane Whitney Show, in 1993, with another Allin fan called Wendy.

GG Allin's older brother Merle Allin was bassist for his last band, the Murder Junkies.

=== Beliefs ===
Allin was a self-identified extreme individualist, misanthrope, and anti-authoritarian, promoting lawlessness and violence against police officers in many of his lyrics; his essay, The GG Allin Manifesto, was intended to summarize his personal philosophy. He revealed on Geraldo that he believed his body to be a temple of rock and roll, and that his flesh, blood, and bodily fluids were a communion to the people. Another reason given for his onstage antics, according to Dino, the drummer of his band, was that Allin wanted to draw a parallel between his actions and "a society that's going crazy with violence". Allin also said that if he were not a performer, he would probably be a serial killer or mass murderer.

Allin believed in some form of afterlife. He planned to die by suicide onstage on Halloween many times in the late 1980s and early 1990s, but was stopped due to prison sentences around Halloween each year. He explained his views on death in the film Hated: GG Allin and the Murder Junkies, stating: "It's like I've got this wild soul that just wants to get out of this life. It's too confined in this life. I think that to take yourself out at your peak ... if you could die at your peak, your strongest point, then your soul will be that much stronger in the next existence."

== Death ==
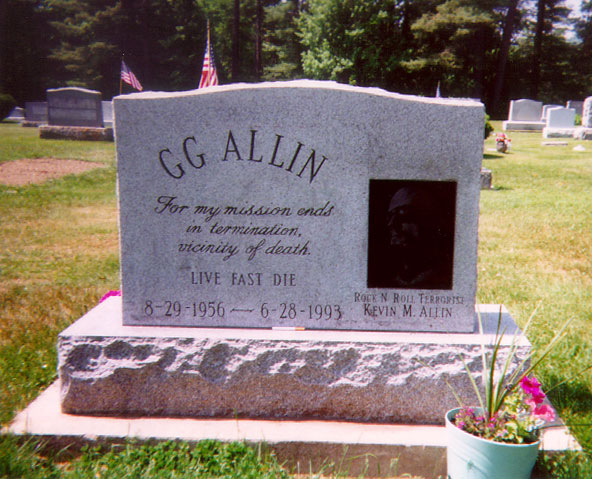
Allin's gravestone before it was removed in Littleton, New Hampshire

GG Allin's last show was on June 27, 1993, at a small club called The Gas Station, a punk venue located inside a former gas station at 194 East 2nd Street in Manhattan. In a first-hand account by Michael Bowling, the show ended after three songs, when a melee broke out. Allin ended up outside, leading a group of fans through the neighborhood.

According to Bowling, after walking the streets for almost an hour, Allin eventually went to Johnny Puke's apartment. There, he and others continued to party and use drugs. Along with Johnny Puke, Allin ingested large amounts of heroin, on which he overdosed and slipped into an unconscious state. Sometime in the early morning of June 28, Allin died from the effects of his heroin overdose. Later that morning, Puke noticed that Allin still lay motionless. He posed for Polaroids with the corpse before calling for an ambulance. Allin was pronounced dead at the scene aged 36.

=== Funeral ===
Allin's funeral took place on July 3, 1993, in his native New Hampshire at St. Rose Cemetery in Littleton. At his funeral, Allin's bloated corpse was dressed in his black leather jacket and trademark jockstrap. Allin's funeral became a celebration of his life.

== Legacy ==
Video footage of the soundcheck, concert, and aftermath of Allin's final performance, which happened on the day of his death, was appended to the 1997 DVD release of Hated.

GG Allin's grave was frequently vandalized by fans with urine, feces, cigarette butts, and alcohol, acts that were strongly discouraged by GG's mother Arleta and his brother. His tombstone was removed in 2010 after it was knocked off its base by a fan.

Hank Williams III's 2008 album Damn Right, Rebel Proud features the song "P.F.F.", which features the line "This song is written and dedicated for GG Allin" spoken at the beginning, and contains samples of Allin dialogues in the song's middle section.

On December 13, 2018, Showtime premiered the 2017 documentary GG Allin: All in the Family which documented Allin's life, career and death and how his brother and mother were coping with his death 20 years later.

Wrestler Darby Allin's ring name is derived from the names of GG Allin and Darby Crash.

== Discography ==
- Always Was, Is and Always Shall Be (1980)
- Eat My Fuc (1984)
- You'll Never Tame Me (1985)
- Sing Along Love Songs (1985)
- You Give Love a Bad Name (1987)
- Freaks, Faggots, Drunks & Junkies (1988)
- The Suicide Sessions (1989)
- Beautiful Afterbirth: Fucked & Framed (1990)
- Murder Junkies (1991)
- War in My Head – I'm Your Enemy (1993)
- Brutality and Bloodshed for All (1993)
- Carnival of Excess (1995)

== Bibliography ==
- Greene, Shane (2017). "On Misanthropology (punk, art, species-hate)". In Bakke, Gretchen; Peterson, Marina (eds.). Between Matter and Method: Encounters In Anthropology and Art. London: Bloomsbury Academic. pp. 39–50. ISBN 978-1-4742-8920-7.
