= Madras Art Movement =

Regional art movement from Madras, India

- Years active: c. 1960s – 1980s
- Location: Madras (now Chennai), South India
- Major figures: K. C. S. Paniker, S. Dhanapal, C.L. Mani, D. P. Roy Chowdhury, J. Sultan Ali, L. Munuswamy, A. P. Santhanaraj, V. Viswanadhan, R. B. Bhaskaran, K. M. Adimoolam, P. V. Janakiram, S. G. Vasudev, K. V. Haridasan, M. Senathipathi, Arnawaz Vasudev, T. K. Padmini (and others)
- Influences: Modernism, Folk art
- Influenced: South Indian art

The Madras Art Movement, or The Madras Movement, was a regional art movement that emerged in Madras (now Chennai), South India, from the early 1960s through the 1980s. It is recognized for its efforts to establish a modernist Indian artistic identity rooted in indigenous and regional traditions and art forms, local history, and mythology. The Government College of Fine Arts, Chennai and Cholamandal Artists' Village served as the key centres for this movement with artists like D. P. Roy Chowdhury and K. C. S. Paniker playing a pioneering role in shaping its direction.

Several notable artists emerged from this movement such as A. P. Santhanaraj, L. Munuswamy, Anthony Doss, Redappa Naidu, K. Sreenivasulu, Sultan Ali, Velu Viswanadhan, K. M. Adimoolam, S. G. Vasudev, and T. K. Padmini, all of whom played significant roles in shaping the movement's identity and achieved national and international recognition. After the death of Paniker in 1977, the cohesive movement as it was originally conceived gradually dissolved due to loss of the pivotal leadership, internal divisions, emergence of new art centers, and shifts in the broader art world.

== Development ==
The epicenter of the Madras Art Movement was the Madras School of Arts & Crafts, a private art school established in 1850 under British coloninal rule by Colonel Alexander Hunter. The school was initially focused on creation of art goods for western markets, and it was the first art school founded in India and one of the first in Asia. In 1852, it came under the rule of the colonial government and was renamed as the Government School of Industrial Arts. After the independence of India, it became the Government College of Arts & Crafts in 1963.

All great traditions in art are storehouses of deathless creative energy which under contingencies can kindle itself anew, vibrate with life and inspire to reach greater heights.

— K. C. S. Paniker

As the only comprehensive art institution in South India until the 1960s, it attracted students from Tamil Nadu, Kerala, Karnataka, and Andhra Pradesh, fostering a pan-Dravidian artistic collective. Contemporary art centers like Bombay (now Mumbai) were heavily influenced by the western culture and colonial academic styles. The movement, having emerged in the backdrop of Indian's post-independence cultural renaissance, instead sought to inspire "nativism," an approach that encouraged artists to draw inspiration from their immediate cultural environment, including regional folk arts, crafts, temple architecture, classical dance forms, traditional symbols like the Kolam, local religious iconography, and ancient scripts.

D. P. Roy Chowdhury, a sculptor, was the first Indian principal (1930 – 1957) of the institution. He initiated curriculum changes emphasizing a fine arts curriculum and an empirical approach, moving away from colonial academicism. His successor, K. C. S. Paniker, a painter, further extended these ideas. Paniker critically urged artists to look inwards and develop a "regional modernism." Criticism of Paniker's own earlier works for lacking an "Indian quotient" reportedly fueled his resolve to explore indigenous sources for artistic expression. This led to a conscious effort to synthesize traditional motifs and philosophical concepts with modern artistic techniques. He systematically revised the curriculum to integrate technical training in regional crafts—such as Thanjavur painting, temple sculpture, and batik dyeing—with modernist abstraction, creating a hybrid aesthetic. The institution became a crucial space for artistic training and ideological discourse and fostered a generation of artists who would define regional modernism in South India.

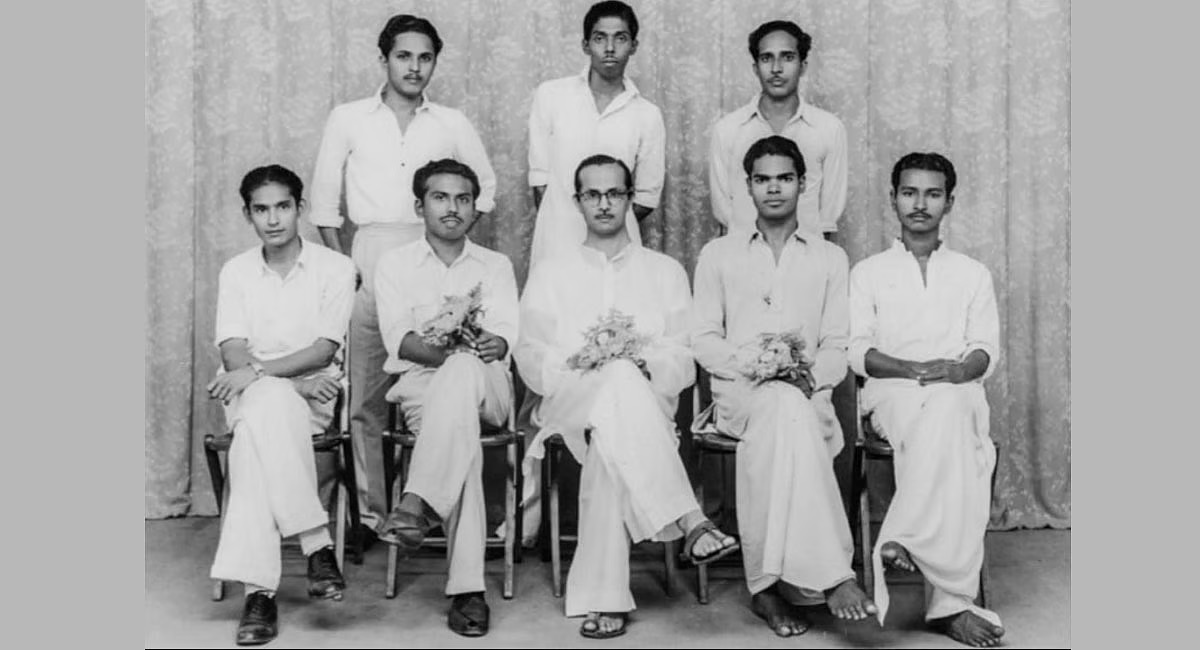
KCS Paniker (centre) with his students in Madras Art School in 1952.

=== Establishment of Cholamandal Artists' Village ===
In 1966, K. C. S. Paniker established the Cholamandal Artists' Village in Injambakkam, near the outskirts of Chennai, with nearly thirty students and fellow artists, most of them from the Government College of Arts and Crafts. It was created as a self-sufficient commune where artists could live, work, and create art free from commercial pressures, becoming the largest artists' commune in India and a significant center for the Madras Movement. Artists engaged in crafts like batik and metalwork to support themselves, later focusing on painting and sculpture. Currently, the village also houses a museum showcasing works representative of the Madras Art Movement.

== Characteristics and styles ==
D Venkatapathy uses steel pen and water-proof black ink-based drawing to create lines and textures are using pointillistic technique (1980).

Artists of the Madras Art Movement worked in diverse styles, encompassing both figurative and abstract idioms, but defined by the integration of traditional Indian elements in a modernist framework.

=== Painting ===
In painting, there was a strong emphasis on line, color, and pattern, often drawing from local aesthetics. K. C. S. Paniker's later works, particularly his "Words and Symbols" series (1963 – 1975), are iconic examples. These abstract compositions incorporated calligraphic forms resembling Malayalam script, mathematical notations, astrological charts, and symbols from Tantric and tribal art. For example, R. B. Bhaskaran's 'Planets' (1972) features Tantric symbols, a birth symbol in the form of a sapling, and intricate linework, and K. V. Haridasan's 'Brahma Sutra' (1990) uses symbols from almanacs, tantras and dance mudras, but with pop colours.

Other painters explored themes from mythology, local legends, rural life, and spiritual concepts. The use of vibrant, often non-naturalistic colors and decorative motifs was common. Artists like J. Sultan Ali drew inspiration from folk deities and tribal art forms, while others like K. M. Adimoolam were known for their abstract explorations of nature and color. The movement also saw the emergence of notable women artists such as Arnawaz Vasudev, known for her ink and wash works, and T. K. Padmini, whose paintings often depicted rural female figures and explored themes of identity.

=== Sculpture ===
Sculptors associated with the movement also engaged with traditional forms and materials but incorporated modern expressions. P. V. Janakiram was notable for his sheet metal sculptures, often frontal and linear, inspired by South Indian temple carvings and icons. He utilized techniques like repoussé to create intricate surfaces. The use of terracotta, bronze, and wood was prevalent, with forms often blending human, animal, and divine imagery.

== Key artists ==
- D. P. Roy Chowdhury
- K. C. S. Paniker
- S. Dhanapal
- D. Venkatapathy
- J. Sultan Ali
- L. Munuswamy
- A. P. Santhanaraj
- V. Viswanathan
- R. B. Bhaskaran
- K. M. Adimoolam
- P. V. Janakiram
- S. G. Vasudev
- K. V. Haridasan
- M. Senathipathi
- Arnawaz Vasudev
- T. K. Padmini
- C. Douglas
- Achuthan Kudallur
- Alphonso Doss
- C. J. Anthony Doss
- K. Ramanujam

== Influence and legacy ==
The Madras Art Movement played a crucial role in shaping a distinct modern artistic identity for South India. It emphasized indigenous vocabulary, unlike the Progressive Artists' Group of Bombay, which engaged more directly with international modernism.

Initially described as a "late phenomenon" within the narrative of national Indian modernism and underrepresented in early mainstream art discourse, the Madras Art Movement has since received scholarly recognition for its role in shaping modern Indian art. Exhibitions and academic studies have highlighted its contributions to the movement's diversity, and the Cholamandal Artists' Village continues to operate by supporting artists and maintaining archival materials.

== See also ==
- Indian art
- Bengal School of Art
- Progressive Artists' Group
- Cholamandal Artists' Village
- Government College of Fine Arts, Chennai
