= S. Nandagopal =

Indian sculptor and painter, (1946 – 2017)

- Born: 1946; Bangalore, Kingdom of Mysore, British India (now Bengaluru, Karnataka, India)
- Died: 2017 (aged 70–71); Cholamandal Artists' Village, Injambakkam, Chennai, Tamil Nadu, India
- Education: Loyola College, Chennai; Government College of Fine Arts, Chennai
- Known for: Metal sculptures
- Movement: Madras Art Movement
- Spouse: Kala
- Awards: 1970 Lalit Kala Akademi Award; 1978 Lalit Kala Akademi Award; 2002 Jindal Stainless Steel Award for Sculpture

Shankar Nandagopal (1946 – 14 April 2017) was an Indian sculptor and painter, known for his sculptures in metal. He was one of the last members of the Madras Art Movement which pioneered modernism in art in south India and the son of K. C. S. Paniker, the founder of the movement as well as the Cholamandal Artists' Village. A two-time recipient of the Lalit Kala Akademi Award, Nandagopal was awarded the Jindal Stainless Steel Award for Sculpture in 2002.

== Biography ==
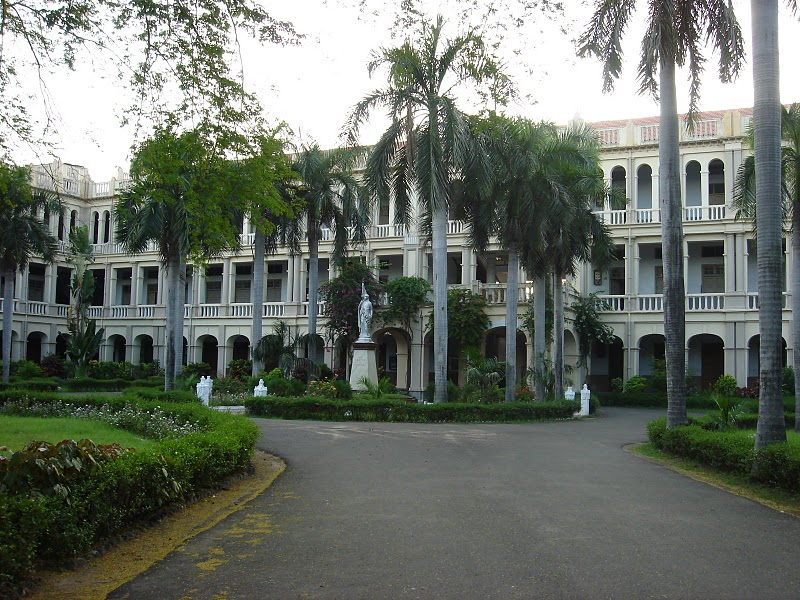
Loyola College, Chennai

S. Nandagopal was born in 1946 at Bengaluru, in the south Indian state of Karnataka to K. C. S. Paniker, noted painter, a former principal of the Government College of Fine Arts, Chennai and the founder of Cholamandal Artists' Village. His under graduate studies were at Loyola College, Chennai and after earning a bachelor's degree in physics in 1966 from the University of Madras and joined the Government College of Fine Arts, Chennai to secure a diploma in fine arts in 1971. He moved into Cholamandal Artists' Village, following his father, in 1972. His focus was in sculptures, mostly in copper and bronze, and he was known for large metal sculptures. Later, he also indulged in painting and wrote a book on his father, titled Paniker, which is one of the few studies on K. C. S. Paniker. His contributions were also reported in the establishment of an open-air theatre and the Museum of the Madras Art Movement at Cholamandal and his works have been exhibited in several exhibitions including the exhibition at the Singapore Art Museum in 2006 where most of his works were in display.

Nandagopal was married to Kala and the couple had a daughter, Pallavi. He died on 14 April 2017, at the age of 71, succumbing to a massive cardiac arrest, at his residence in Cholamandal Artists' Village.

== Awards and honours ==
Nandagopal, who considered the noted sculptor, P. V. Jankiram, as his mentor, received his first major honour in the form of Lalit Kala Akademi Award in 1970. This was followed by a number of awards which include another Lalit Kala Akademi Award in 1978, the gold medal at the IVth International Triennale in New Delhi in 1978 and the Jindal Stainless Steel Award for Sculpture in 2002. He was also a recipient of fellowships such as Homi Bhaba Fellowship (1980), British Council Travel Grant, ICCR Travel Grant (1985) and Government of India Senior Fellowship (1990) and he featured in two Oxford University Press publications, The Madras Metaphor (1993) and The Algebra of Figuration (2000). He was also nominated as an advisor to the National Gallery of Modern Art, New Delhi.

== See also ==
- Kanayi Kunhiraman
- Namboothiri (artist)
