= ISKCON Temple, Chennai =

Radha Krishna temple in Chennai, India

ISKCON Chennai
- Sri Sri Radha Krishna Mandir ஸ்ரீ ஸ்ரீ ராதா கிருஷ்ணர் கோவில்
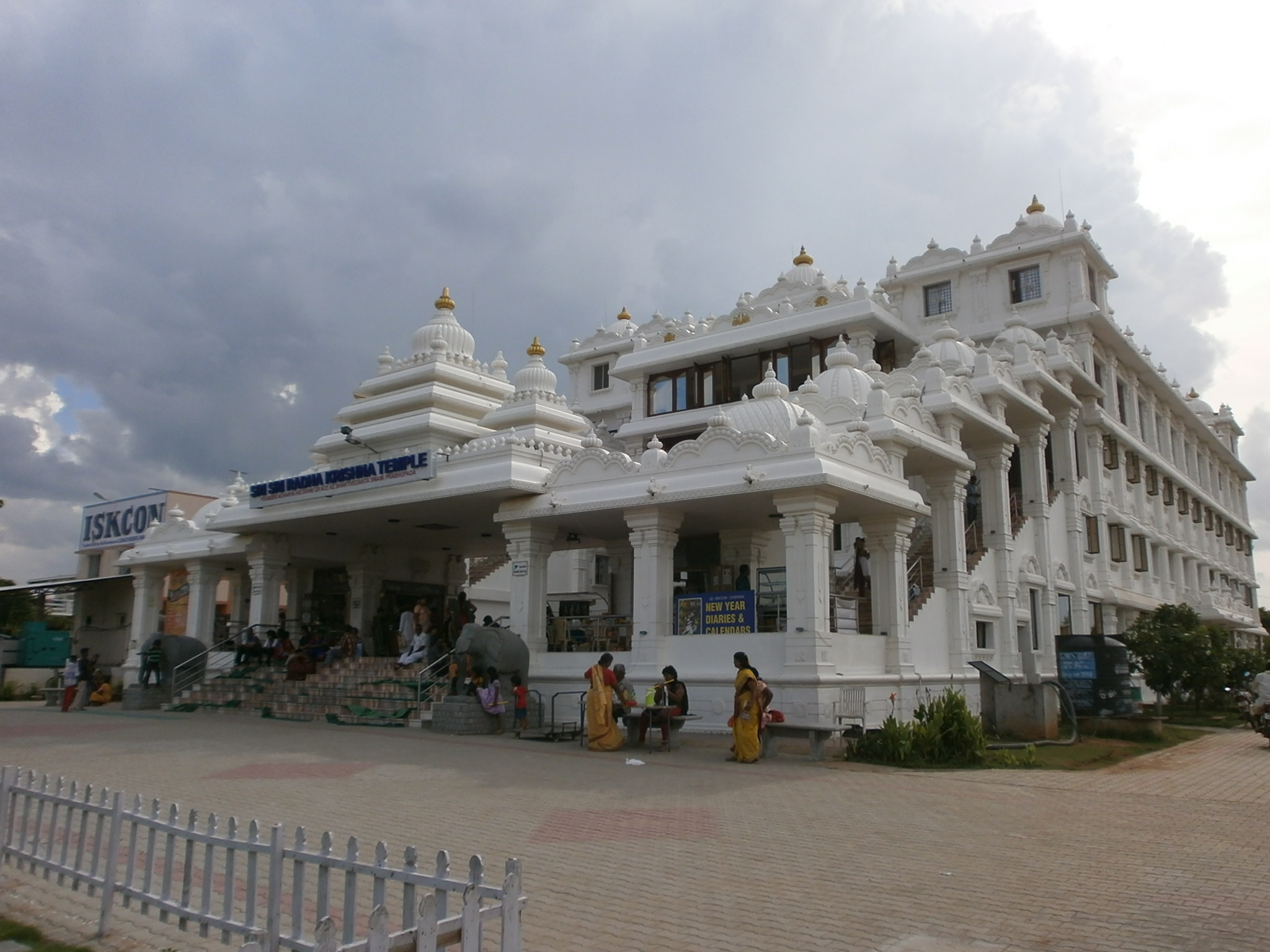
- The ISKCON temple in Chennai

Religion
- Affiliation: Hinduism
- District: Kanchipuram
- Deity: Radha Krishna
- Festivals: Janamashtami, Radhashtami, Ratha-Yatra

Location
- Location: Hare Krishna land, Bhaktivedantha Swami Road, Akkarai, Sholinganallur, Injambakkam, Chennai 600 119
- State: Tamil Nadu
- Country: India
- Interactive map of ISKCON Chennai
- Coordinates: 12°54′22″N 80°14′30″E

Architecture
- Type: Hindu temple architecture
- Creator: ISKCON
- Completed: 2012; 14 years ago

Website
- iskconchennai.org

ISKCON Temple Chennai, also known as the Sri Sri Radha Krishna Mandir, is a Gaudiya Vaishnavism temple in Chennai, India. The temple is dedicated to the Hindu god Krishna and his consort Radha. It was formally inaugurated on 26 April 2012.

== History ==
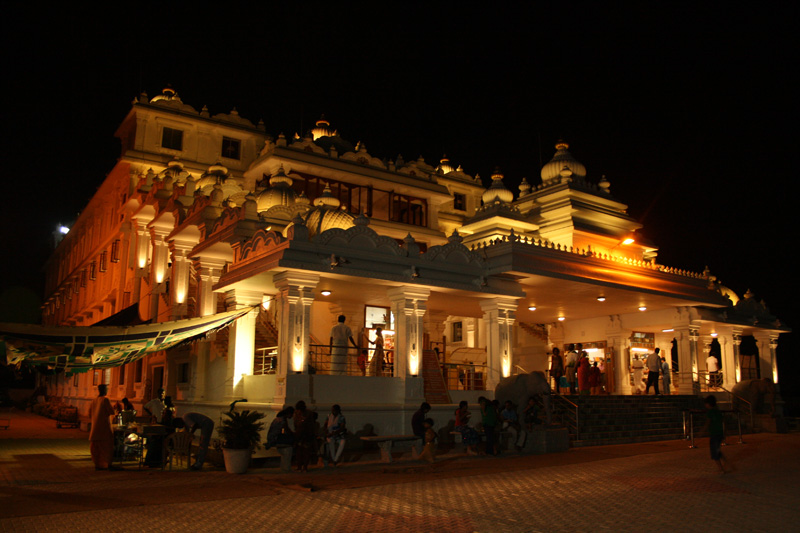
ISKCON temple at night

ISKCON founder A. C. Bhaktivedanta Swami Prabhupada, wanted to establish ISKCON centers in India. In 1971, when he returned to India after his success with spread of ISKCON in the Western world, he directed Giriraj Maharaj to go to Madras and preach activities, resulting in many enlisting as life patrons. Prabhupada wrote in a letter,

In Madras we wanted to start a center and it was almost settled that the Chief Justice (Veeraswamy) would give us a place. So actually, if it is possible to open a center in Madras that would be very nice.

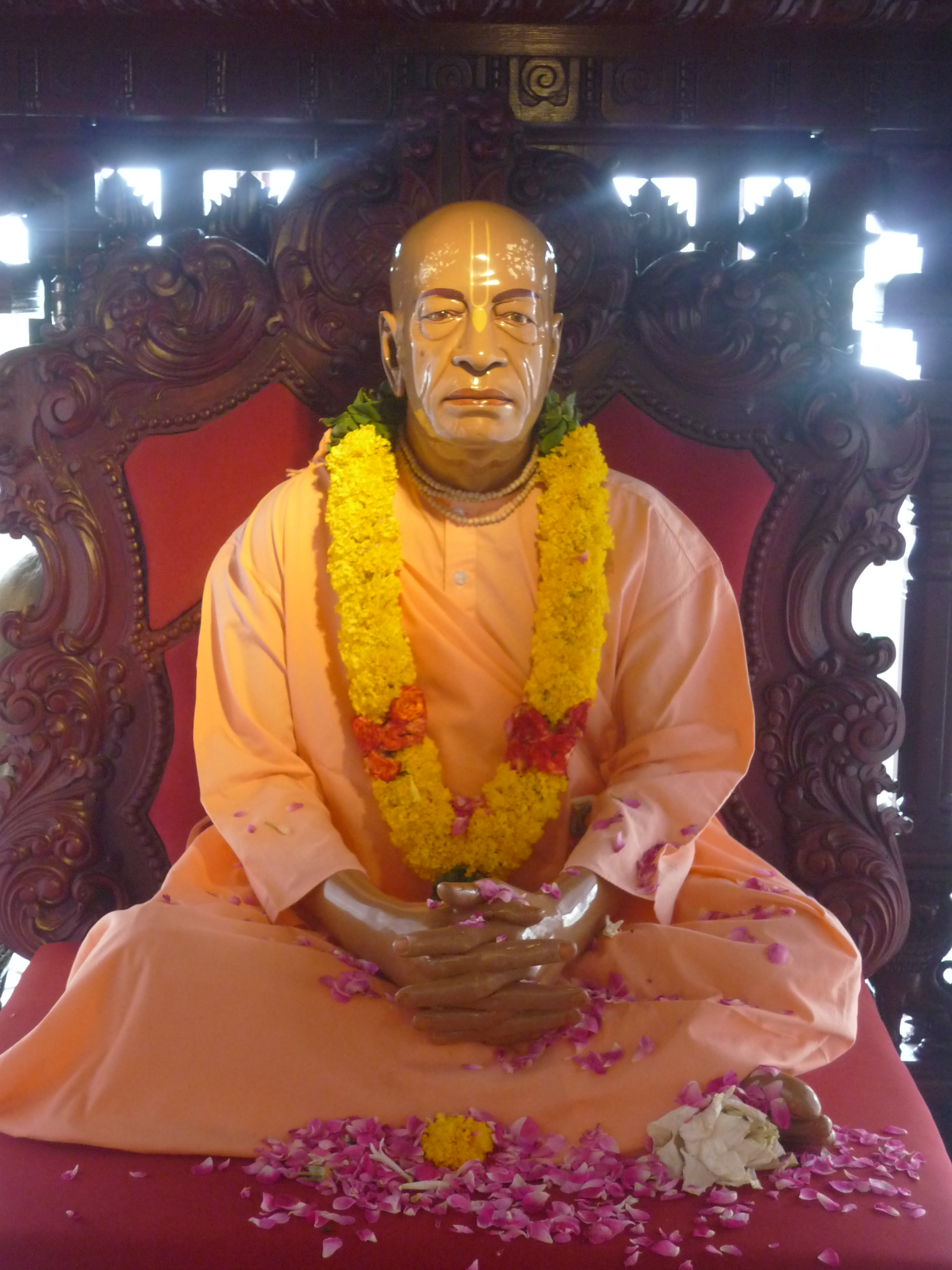
Life-size statue of Swami Prabhupada

Prabhupada visited Madras in February 1972 and delivered lectures. In 1975, a centre was opened at 50 Aspiran Gardens, 2nd Street, Kilpauk, which was later shifted to Kilpauk Garden Road. In 1988, the centre moved to T. Nagar, where the congregation of Chennai ISKCON increased greatly. During a morning walk on 18 December 1975, Prabhupada remarked: "Now our European and American boys are preaching in South India and big, big acaryas have received them."

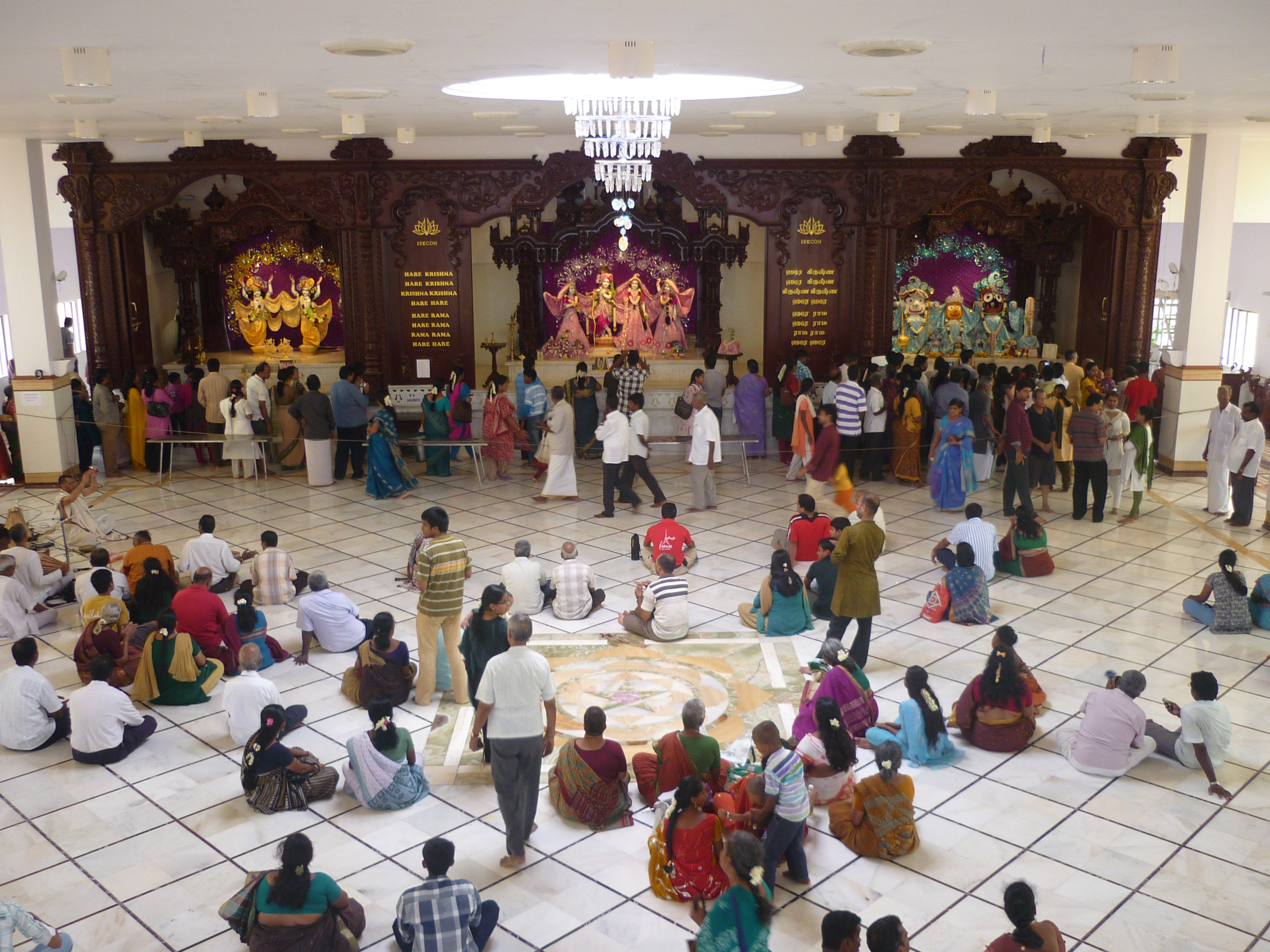
The central prayer hall

In January 1976, Prabhupada visited Madras again and lectured in AVM Rajeswari Kalyana Mandapam, Dr. Radhakrishnan Salai and in the house of the then Chief Justice Veeraswamy. Inspired by the positive response to Krishna consciousness in Madras, Prabhupada wrote a letter to his disciples in Madras:

In Madras we have to construct a very gorgeous temple… Now immediately find out some land and begin the construction. Never mind what the cost will be. We are not concerned with the amount of money, but we want a very attractive temple. The money should come from the gentlemen of Madras.

However, the effort to fulfill the desire of Prabhupada to build a "gorgeous temple" in Chennai did not prove fruitful until 2000 when devotees serving under the leadership of Bhanu Swami located 6.5 acres of land in Injambakkam and acquired immediately for construction of the temple. The temple was built solely on donations received from people in Chennai. The construction of the first phase of the project began on 17 March 2002. The temple has been built with the support of about 8,000 life patrons and contributions from devotees. Built on 45,000 sq ft of land, the temple cost ₹ 100 million.

The prana pratishtha (deity installation) ceremony, when the deities of Lord Krishna and Radha and their sakhis—Lalitha and Vishaka—were installed in one of the three teak-wood altars in the main hall, and Kumbhabhishekam were performed on 26 April 2012. After the Kumbhabishekam and Maha mangala arati—the first decorated darshan of the deities—flowers were showered from a helicopter over the gopurams built in the Kalinga style with a Sudarshana Chakra on the top of the tallest tower. The deities in the temple on Burkit Road, T. Nagar unit have also been shifted to this temple.

At the time of inauguration, the temple was still under construction with a 90-ft-long construction, which was to function as the kitchen and annadhan hall, nearing completion.

== Structure ==
ISKCON Temple Chennai is part of the Centre for Spiritual Art and Culture and is located off the East Coast Road at the Hare Krishna land, Sholinganallur. The deities worshipped in the temple include those of Radha Krishna Lalita Vishaka, Jagannath Baladev Subhadra, and Sri Sri Nitai Gauranga.

Spread over an area of over 1.5 acres, the temple is constructed on five levels. There is a 7,000 sq ft temple hall on the first floor, an auditorium for cultural and spiritual programmes on the ground floor and a prasadam hall in the basement.

In the temple hall, there are three teak-wood altars which house the deities of Lord Krishna with his chief consort Radharani and their assisting friends Lalita and Vishaka, Lord Chaitanya with Lord Nityananda and Lord Jagannath, Baladeva and Subhadra. These deities have been sourced from Jaipur and Orissa. Designed under the guidance of Sri Bhanu Swami, the temple has imbibed various attributes from Vedic scripture and is inspired by the Pallava and Kalinga architecture.

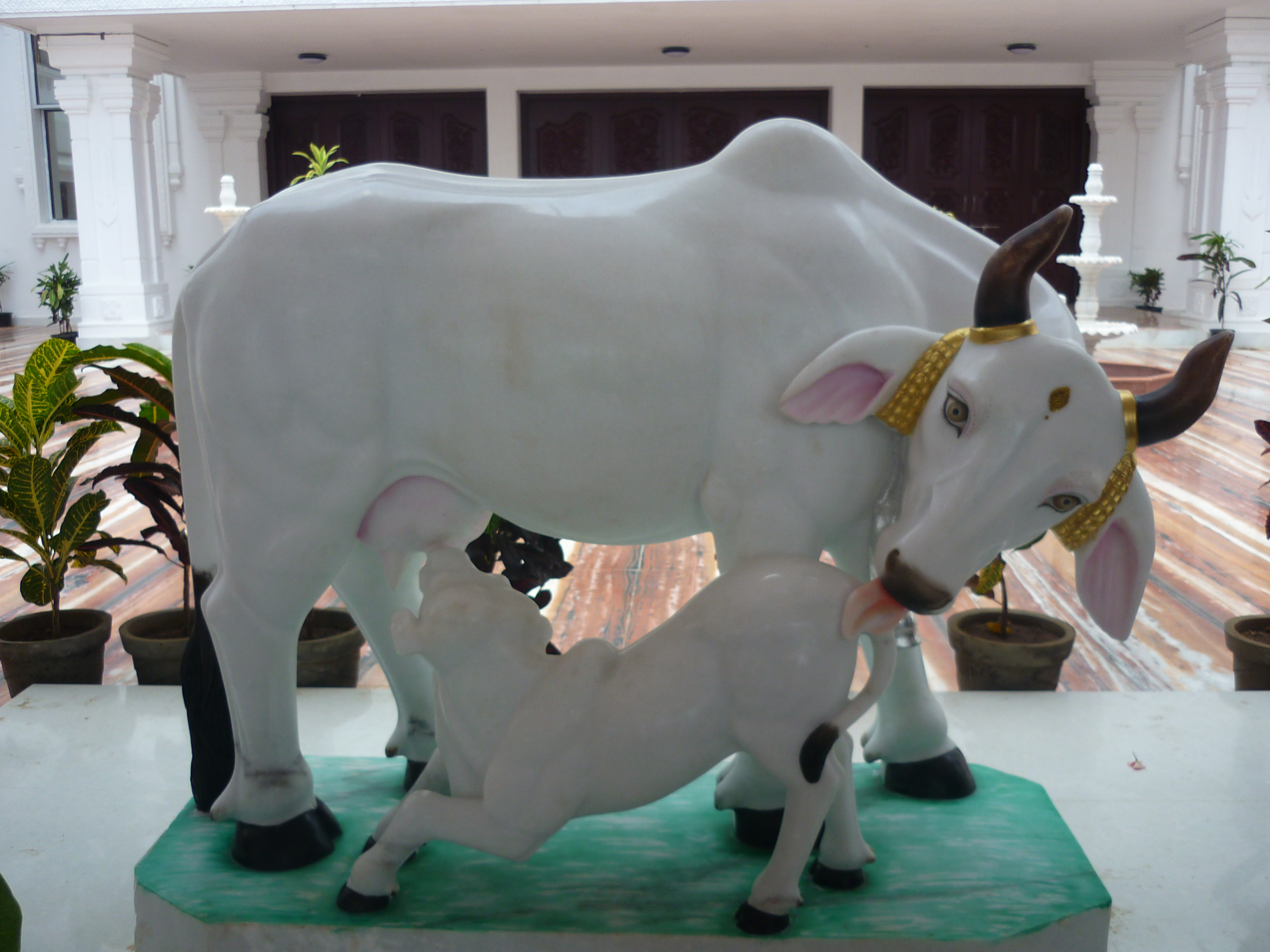
Statue of a cow feeding her calf

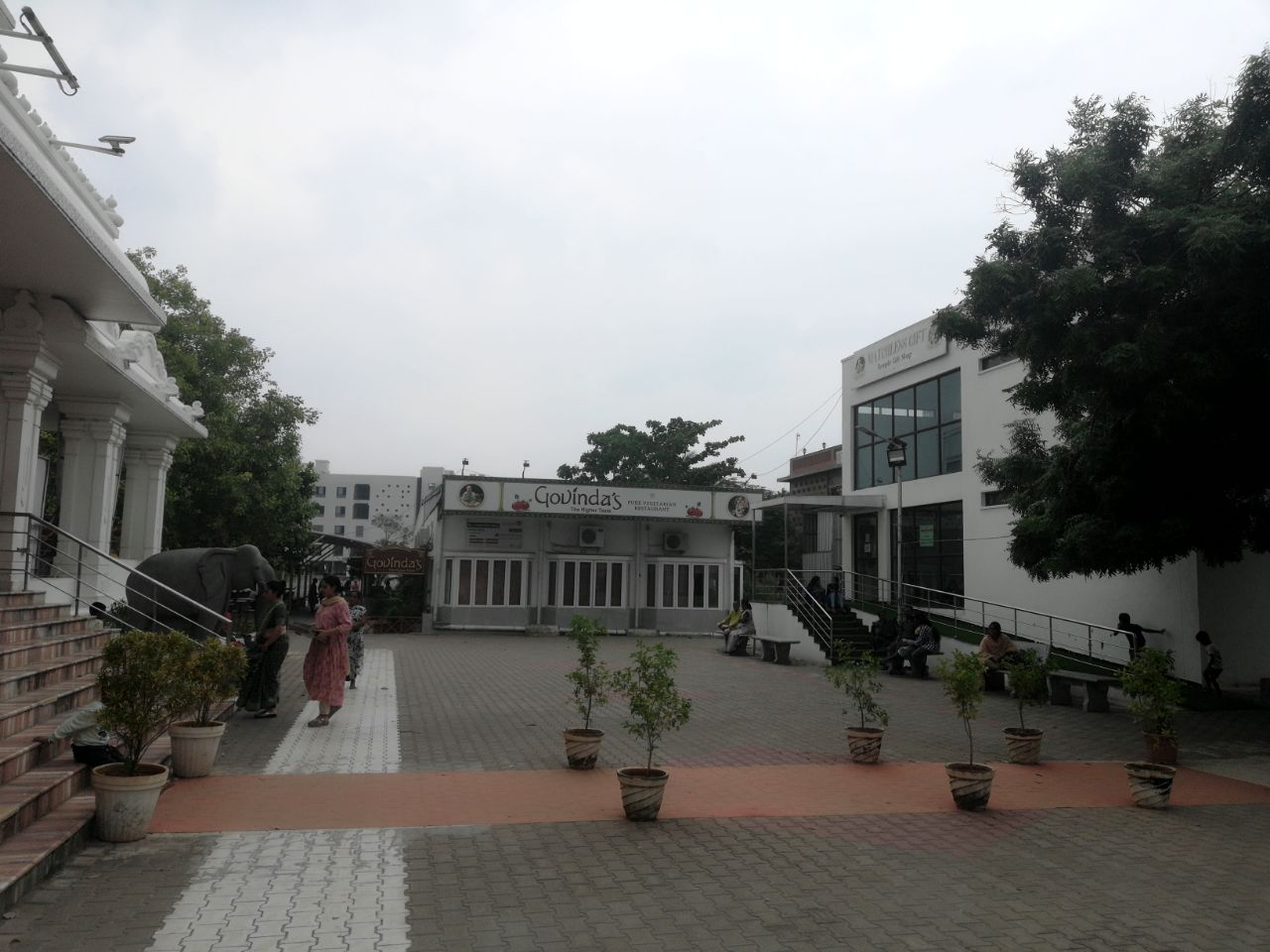
Restaurant and souvenir shop at ISKCON Chennai

The entrance to the temple is marked by the representation of the bhu-mandala or the universe on the marble floor. According to the cosmology of ancient Vedic puranas, the universe is described as series of circular islands surrounding a central pillar called Mount Meru. The design on the floor at the entrance depicts the same universal pattern. There is also a life-like statue of a cow feeding its calf at the portico.

The primary purpose of the temple to transform the material self-centred identity into a spiritual identity of unconditional love is graphically represented by means of a chandelier that projects various colours on the walls and ceiling. The chandelier has 500 Himalayan quartz crystals supposedly meant to intensify the spiritual energy in the temple.

The temple also visually displays various vastu shastra features. A booklet explaining all these features is available at the book shop, which is located near the portico. Here you can find books and souvenirs on spirituality and Hindu philosophy. The temple is open from 7:30 am to 1:00 pm and from 4:00 pm to 8:00 pm. However, the last aarati (worship), called the sayana arati, is at 9:00 pm, which lasts about 15 minutes.

== Celebrations ==
The temple conducts an annual Ratha Yatra (chariot procession) festival in February, where the idols of Krishna, Rukmini, Satyabhama, Gaura Nitai, and Prabhupada were taken on procession on a decorated chariot through the neighbouring areas of Adyar, Besant Nagar, and Thiruvanmiyur, with performances of traditional Tamil art forms, singing, and chanting. Besides, the annual Puri Jagannath Rath Yatra is celebrated in July, where idols of Lord Jagannath, Lord Balabhadra, and Subhadra are taken on chariot procession around the neighbouring areas of Pallavakam, Neelankarai, Vettuvankeni, and Injambakkam before reaching its final destination at the ISKCON Temple at Akkarai.

Other annual celebrations include the following:

- Gaura Purnima (March), commemorating the birth of Lord Chaitanya Mahaprabhu, who lived around the 15th century in Navadvipa, West Bengal, to spread the yuga-dharma, which refers to the congregational chanting of the Hare Krishna Mahamantra
- Jhulan Yatra and Balarama Jayanthi (August), commemorating the divine love of Radha and Krishna and the birth of Balarama
- Krishna Janmashtami (August), commemorating the birth of Krishna
- Damodar Month or Karthik Month (October–November), which according to the Skanda Purana and Padma Purana, marks the time when Krishna allowed his foster mother Yashoda to tie him to a mortar, which devotees believe symbolize his sweetness and accessibility to devotees.

== Courses ==
The temple conducts regular value education programs including classes on the Bhagavad Gita, stories, slokas, bhajans, rhymes for children, arts and crafts, quiz, non-fire cookery, debates and discussions, role-playing, oratory, and so forth.

== Gallery ==
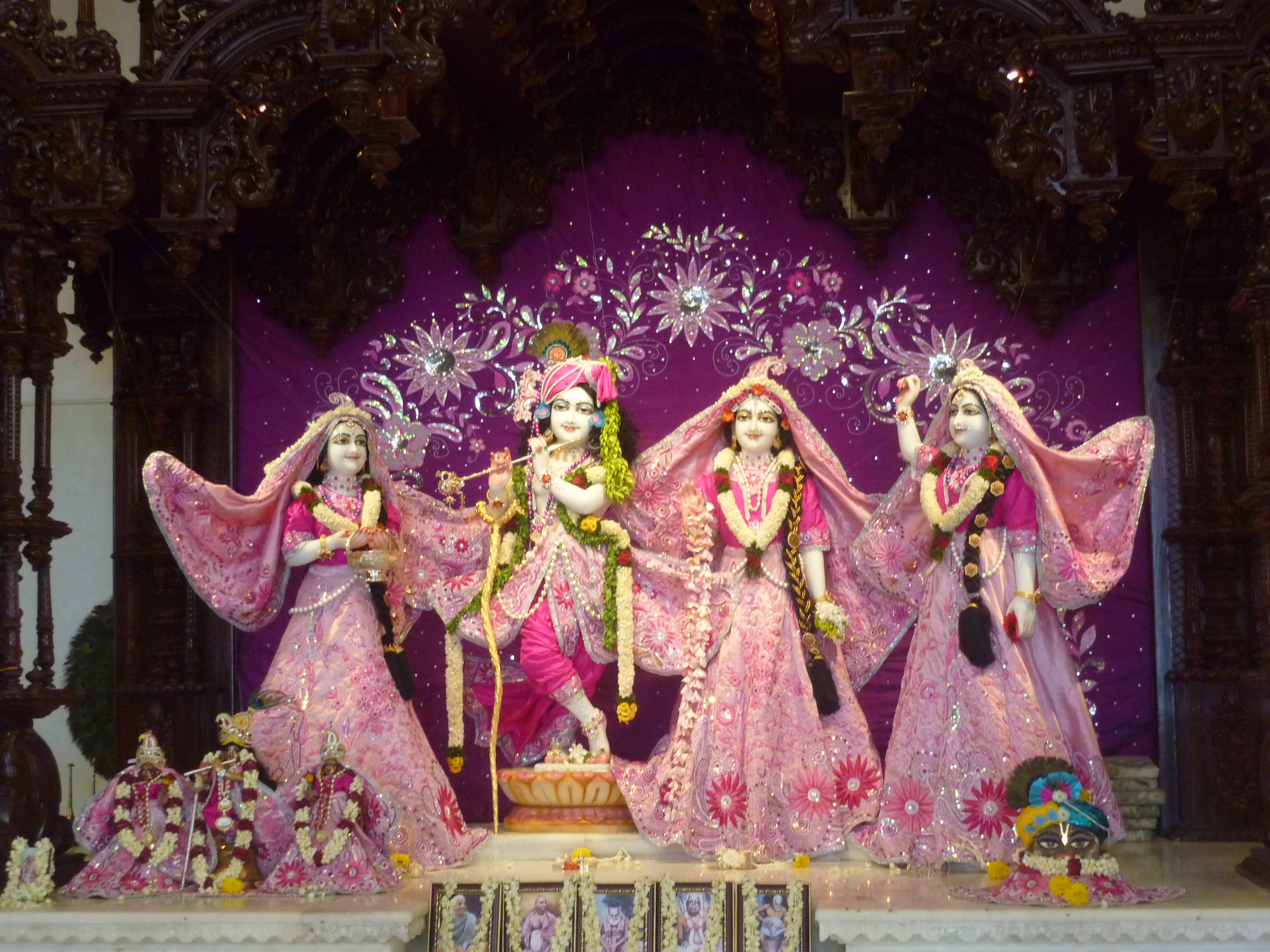
Statues of Lord Krishna and Radharani, along with their sakhis Lalitha and Vishaka

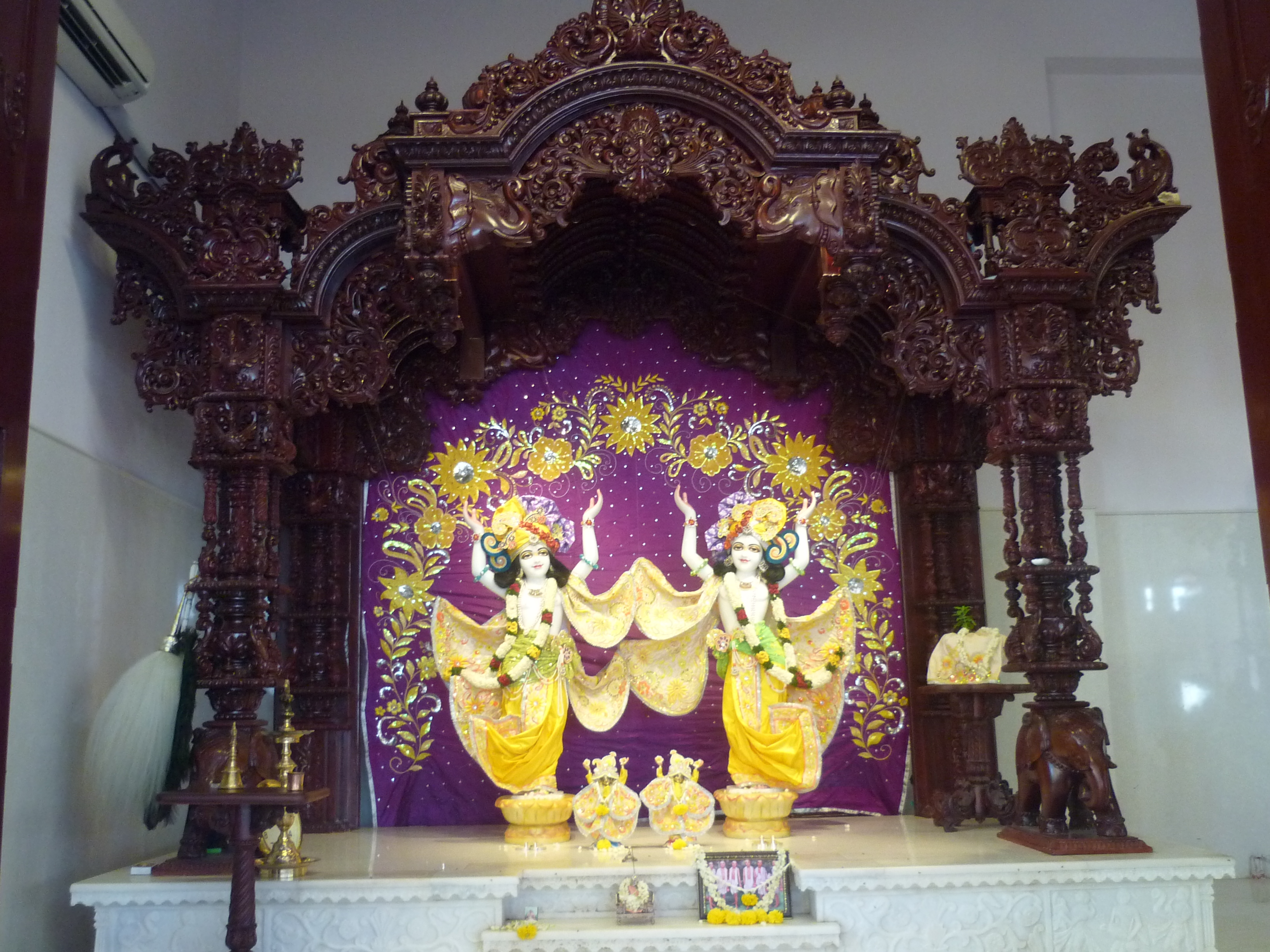
Statues of Lord Chaitanya and Lord Nityananda

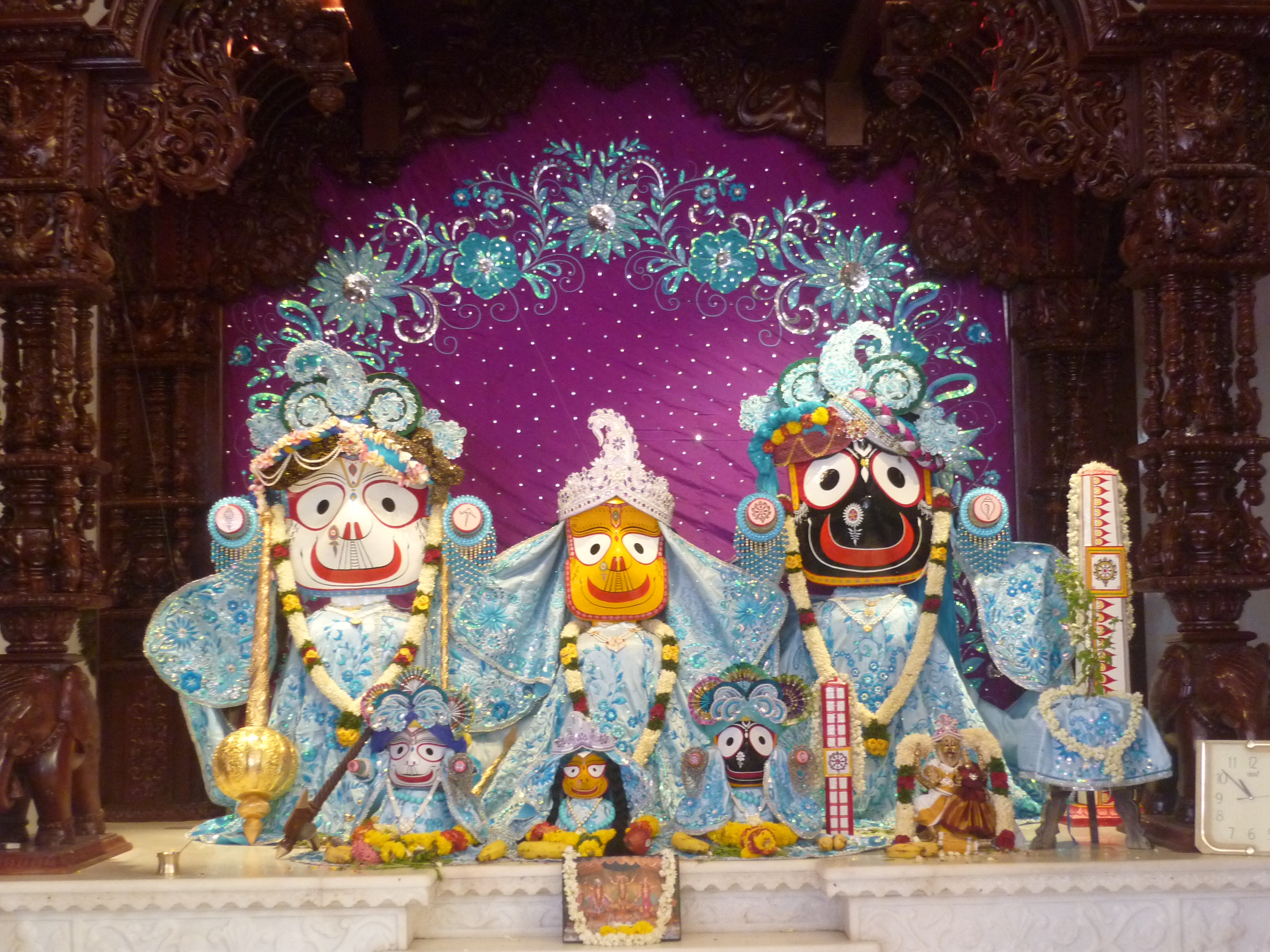
Statues of Lord Jagannath, Lord Baladeva and Mother Subhadra

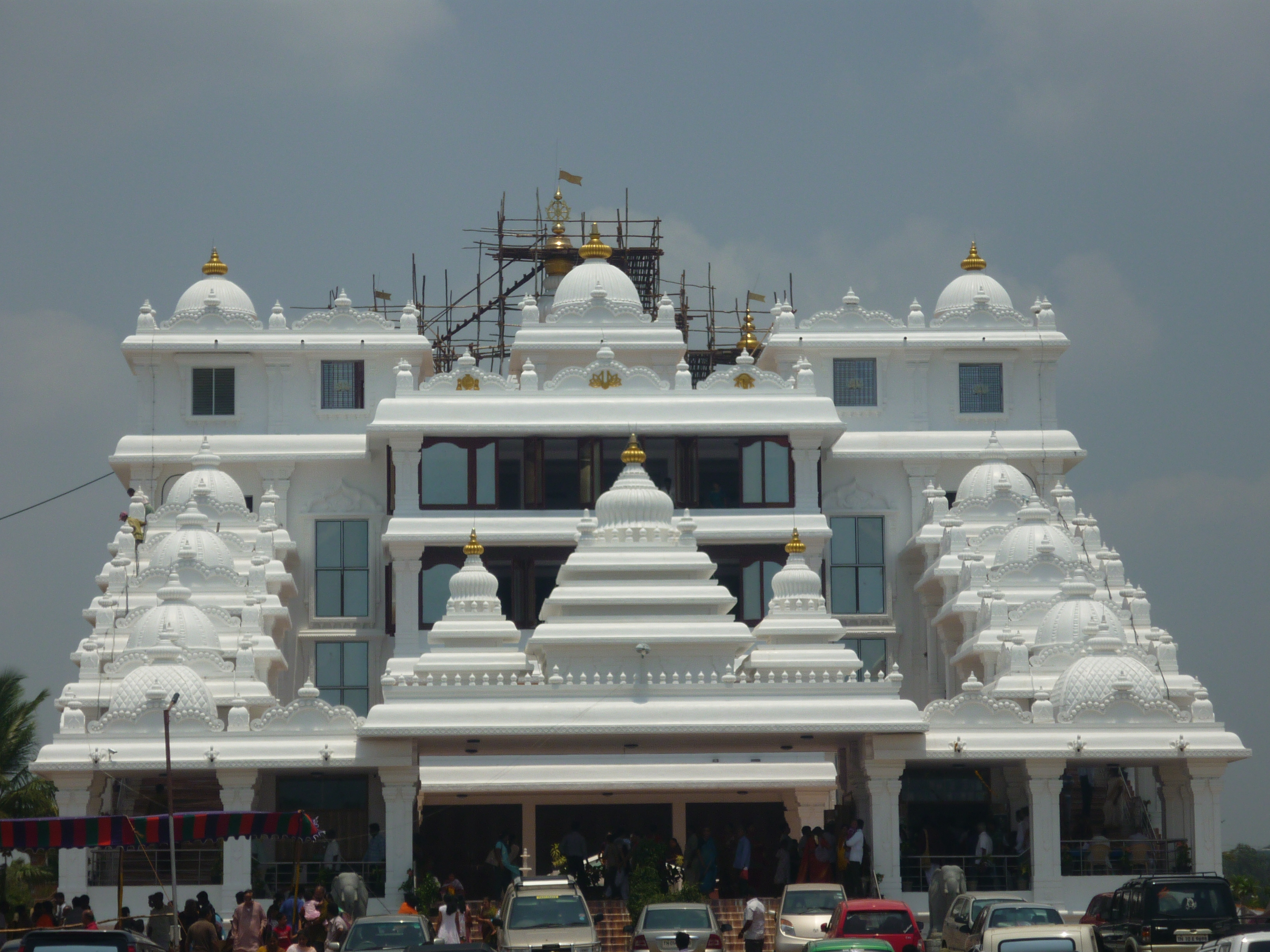
The newly built temple soon after consecration

== See also ==
- Religion in Chennai
