= East Coast Road =

Road in Tamil Nadu, India

- ECR
- East Coast Road highlighted in black

Route information
- Maintained by Highways Department, Tamil Nadu, National Highways Authority of India (NHAI), Tamil Nadu Road Development Company (TNRDC)
- Length: 777 km (483 mi)

Major junctions
- From: Chennai
- To: Kanyakumari

Location
- Country: India
- State: Tamil Nadu
- Districts: Chennai, Chengalpattu, Vilupuram, Pondicherry, Cuddalore, Karaikal, Nagapattinam, Tiruvarur, Thanjavur, Pudukottai, Ramanathapuram, Thoothukudi, Tirunelveli, Kanyakumari
- Major cities: Chennai, Puducherry, Cuddalore, Chidambaram, Karaikal, Nagapattinam, Thiruthuraipoondi, Muthupet, Adirampattinam, Ramanathapuram, Tuticorin, Tiruchendur,Kulasekarapattinam,Manapad,Uvari, Kanyakumari.

Highway system
- Roads in India; Expressways; National; State; Asian; State Highways in Tamil Nadu

East Coast Road (ECR), combination of SH-49, NH-332A, NH-32, officially known as Mutthamizh Arignar Kalaignar Road, is a two-lane highway (now being partially widened to four lanes from Chennai to Mamallapuram) in Tamil Nadu, India, built along the Bay of Bengal coast . It connects Tamil Nadu's state capital Chennai with Kanyakumari via Puducherry, Cuddalore, Chidambaram, Sirkali, Akkur, Nagapattinam, Thirukkadaiyur, Tharangambadi, Karaikal, Nagore, Nagapattinam, Thiruthuraipoondi, Muthupet, Adirampattinam, Manora, Manamelkudi, Mimisal, Ramanathapuram, Thoothukudi, Tiruchendur, Uvari, Kudankulam. The total length of the road is about 777 km between Chennai and Kanyakumari.

ECR once existed from Chennai to Puducherry, later it has been extended to Cuddalore and then to Nagapattinam and then Tuticorin via Ramanathapuram and finally up to Kanyakumari.

The highway is a state highway maintained by the Government of Tamil Nadu under the Department of Highways and Minor Ports and Tamil Nadu Road Infrastructure Development Corporation (TNRIDC). It was a two-lane highway, and has plans to widen into four-lane divided highway till Kanyakumari. It is the most preferred alternate route for southern districts of Tamil Nadu.

The Chennai neighbourhoods on ECR are Thiruvanmiyur, Kottivakkam, Palavakkam, Neelankarai, Injambakkam, Panaiyur, Uthandi, Muttukadu, Covelong and Vilambur.

== History ==
Prior to its completion, the East Coast Road mainly consisted of village roads. The connecting link then was the Old Mahabalipuram Road (SH-49A) till Mahabalipuram. Pondicherry was reached from Chennai through the still existent route via Tambaram, Tindivanam along NH45. In 2000, the State government signed a concessionaire agreement with the TNRDC in order to improve the road, at a cost of ₹ 60 crore. The 113-km long stretch from Akkarai to Pondicherry, dotted with resorts and beach houses, became a toll facility in March 2002 and was widened into a two-lane road from a small winding road passing through 154 villages.

In 2010, TNRDC announced that toll collections had reached an all-time high at ₹ 1.08 crore in December 2009 against the ₹ 54.67 lakh collected in April 2002 when toll operations started.

== Four laning ECR ==
The ECR starts at Thiruvanmiyur in Chennai and is a part of the Chennai City roads till Uthandi. From Uthandi the beachway section starts as a toll road. The speed of the vehicles on this road is restricted to a maximum of 80 km/h. The State Government widened most of East Coast Road to a four lane divided, open access highway by 2015.

The ECR was made a toll road in April 2002. The ECR till Hanumanthai near Pondicherry is 113.2 km long and has a total of 22 bends. On an average 10,000 passenger car units (PCUs) use the road during rush hour and a total of 40,000 PCUs daily, up from about 5,000 daily before the construction of the road. The process of acquiring land for widening the 11.4-km stretch from Thiruvanmiyur to Akkarai covering six revenue villages (including Thiruvanmiyur, Kottivakkam, Palavakkam, Neelankarai, Injambakkam and Vettuvankani), which is under the control of the Highways Department, is under way. The stretch currently has width varying between 50 ft and 80 ft. After widening at a sanctioned cost of ₹ 3,540 million, the stretch would be uniformly 30.5 m (100 ft) wide and would have six lanes, a 1.2-m-wide median, footpath-cum-stormwater drain. ECR extends up to Hanumanthai. On the way to Hanumanthai, a famous location Marakkanam is situated. On the ECR road right side famous Bhoomiswarar Temple is situated. It is believed that Sri Bhoomiswara is the God for Bhoomi, hence, many perform pooja before buying land placing the sale agreement on his holy feet. Hence real estate promoters also rush to this location.

== Places of interest ==
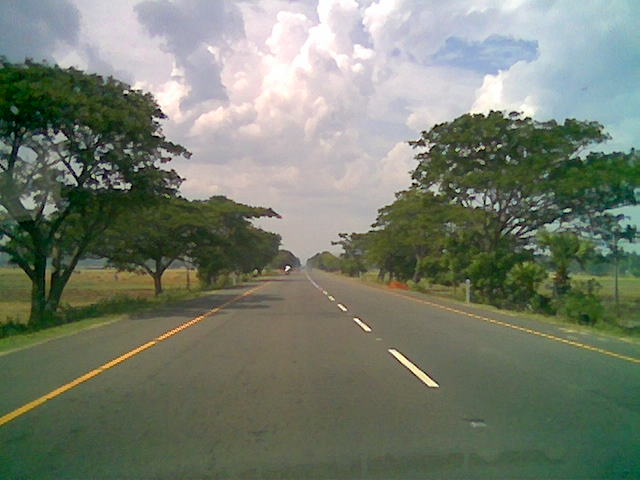
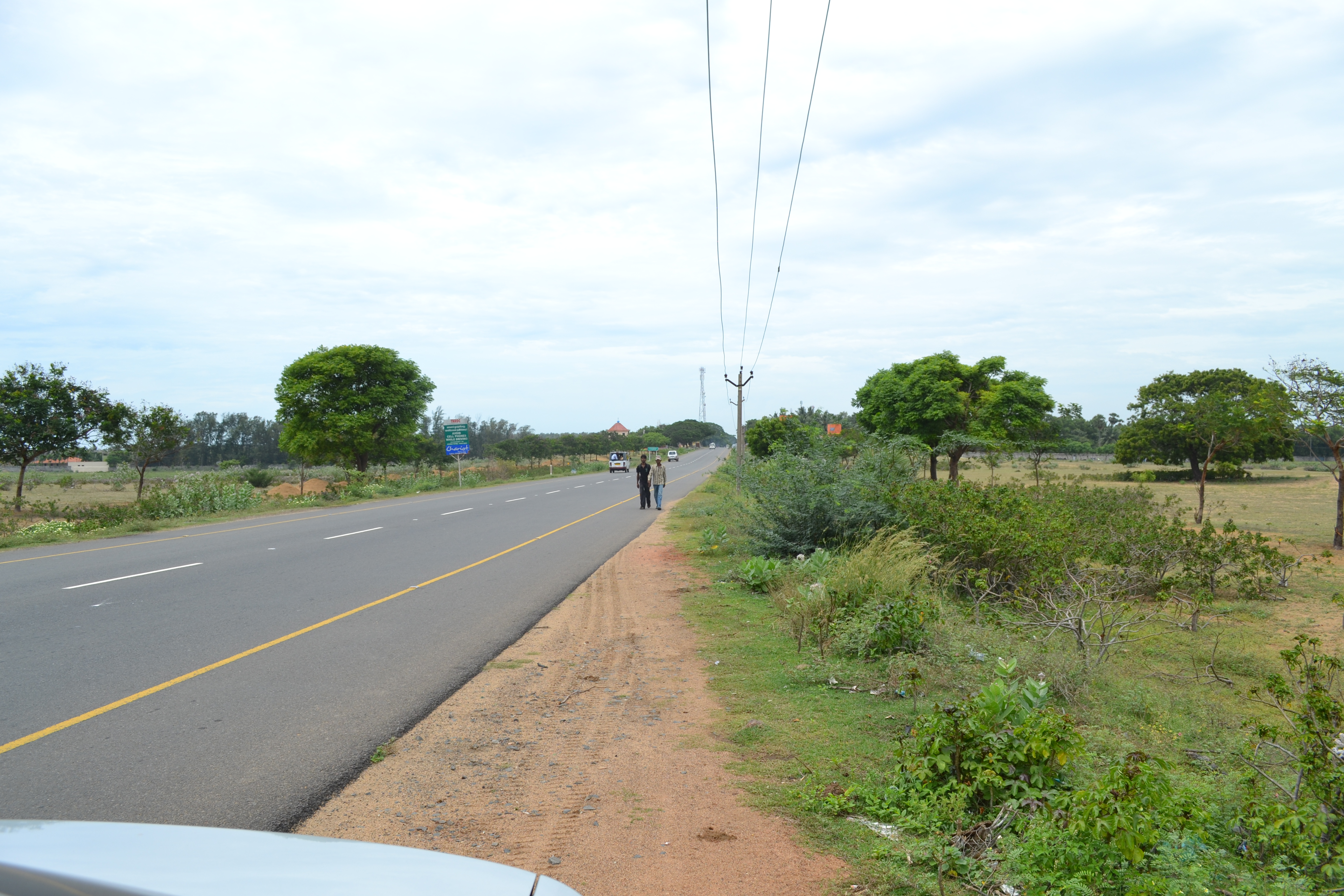
The ECR before 2012; some parts remain 2 lanes.
- Marundeeswarar Temple- Located about 4 km from Adyar and is one of the temples on the East Coast Road. Technically, this marks the beginning of the coastal road.
- Sholinganallur Prathyangira Devi Temple – The temple is located close to the junction and halfway down the link road of ECR and OMR. The Goddess, Shri Maha Prathyangira Devi is throned, gigantic and powerful. Regular poojas are offered every day and special poojas during festive season.
- Cholamandal Artists' Village – Founded in 1966, by K.C.S. Paniker, now an art destination in the state.
- DakshinaChitra – It is a center for the traditions of art, folk performing arts, craft and architecture of India with an emphasis on the traditions of South India. A project of the Madras Craft Foundation (MCF), a non-profit organisation. DakshinaChitra opened to the public in December 1996. The center occupies ten acres overlooking the Bay of Bengal, at Muttukadu, twenty five kilometers south of Chennai, on the East Coast Road.
- Muttukadu boat house – Located at 23 km from Adayar, this area is maintained by the Tamil Nadu Tourism Development Corporation, and offers rowing, wind surfing, water skiing, and speedboat riding.
- Thameem Ansari Darga – Located at Kovalam or Covelong is a Muslim shrine.
- Covelong – Located at 26 km from Adayar, this bay is the site of a colonial Dutch Fort, and a fishing village with wind surfing opportunities.
- Tiger Cave – ancient place with large rocks located before five kilometres from Mamallapuram.
- Thiruvidandai – One of the 108 important places of vaishnavites, this small hamlet houses the temple of Nithyakalyana perumal.
- Madras Crocodile Bank Trust – Center for herpetology
- Mahabalipuram – A UNESCO World Heritage Site with Pallava sculptures and shore temples.
- Kalpakkam - India's 1st indigenously built Nuclear powerplant present here.
- Sadras – A Dutch fort that is in ruins now. First battle between the British and the Dutch was fought here.
- Puducherry is a Union Territory of India. It is a former French colony, consisting of four non-contiguous enclaves, or regions, and named after the largest region, Pondicherry. The territory was officially known as Pondicherry until 2006 when it was renamed Puducherry.
- Cuddalore – Cuddalore, is a municipality in Cuddalore district of the Indian state of Tamil Nadu also the 1st capital of Tamil Nadu during the British government rule. Thiruvanthipuram, Thirupathiripuliyur temples and Silver Beach are located in Cuddalore
- Chidambaram - The World famous Chidambaram Nataraja Hindu Temple - Nataraja Temple is Located in this town which comes under Cuddalore District. Near by Pichavaram Mangrove forest is located which is the largest mangrove forest of Tamil Nadu and also a famous tourist spot.
- Alamparai Fort – is the ruins of an old Moghul fort which was destroyed by the British in the 1700s.
- Tharangambadi – is a town in the Nagapattinam district. It was a Danish colony from 1620 to 1845, and in Danish it is still known as Trankebar/Tranquebar. Danish Museum, New Jerusalem Church, Fort Dansborg were situated here.
- Karaikal – Karaikal is a port city in the Union Territory of Puducherry. It is a former French colony. Nearby the famous Hindu temple for Lord Saneeshvara which is located at Thirunallaru.
- Nagore -Nagore is a town in the Nagapattinam District, Tamil Nadu, India. It is located approximately 12 km south of Karaikal and 5 km north of Nagapattinam. Tiruvarur, Mayiladuthurai are nearby towns. It has a population of approximately 30,000.
- Velankanni -Velankanni has been chosen as one of the heritage cities for HRIDAY – Heritage City Development and Augmentation Yojana scheme of the Government of India.
- Thiruthuraipoondi - Thiruthuraipoondi is a major town in Thiruvarur District and has a taluk on its own. It is situated 27 km from Thiruvarur.
- Muthupet- Muthupet is a small panchayat town in Thiruthuraipoondi Taluk of Thiruvarur District. It is situated 53 km from Thiruvarur.
- Mallipattinam (Manora Fort) – Mallipattinam is a coastal village of Pattukkottai in Thanjavur District with a fort.
- Adhirampattinam Beach-Adhirampattinam is Thanjavur district is important costal town connecting chennai to thoothukudi through east coast road.
- Sethubavachathram Beach-Sethubavachatram is important for fishing in thanjavur district
- Manamelkudi beach -manamelkudi is a coastal village of Pudukkottai District with a kodiyakadu beach.
- 'Mimisal Beach Mimisal is a coastal village of Pudhukottai District with GPM beach
- Thondi - Famous for Beach and nearby mangrove forest. One of the Historic town of Tamil Nadu, This town acted as Pandian Dynasty's Port.
- Ramanathapuram – hosts the Raja Palace. Famous Tourist places Nearby are Rameswaram, Devipattinam, keezhakarai, Paramakudi, Dhanushkodi, etc.
- Erwadi Dargah – hosts an Islamic shrine of Ramanathapuram district.
- Thoothukudi – Thoothukudi also known as Tuticorin, is a port city and a Municipal Corporation in Thoothukudi district of the Indian state of Tamil Nadu. Thoothukudi is the headquarters of Thoothukudi District.
- Thiruchendur – A famous Murugan Temple Located in this town which comes under Thoothukudi District
- Kulasekharapattinam - Famous for Dhasara(navarathri) Festival and also upcoming ISRO's second space port which comes under Tuticorin District
- Uvari - The ancient and famous Shiva temple Uvari Suyambulingaswamy temple is located in this village. RC Christian Churches ( St.Antony's Major Shrine & Selvamatha Church (Kappal Matha Church) are also located here.
- Kudankulam - India's largest atomic power station (Kudankulam Nuclear Power Plant) is located here. It comes under Tirunelveli district
- Vattakottai Fort – Vattakottai Fort was built in the 18th century as a coastal defence-fortification and barracks in the erstwhile Travancore kingdom
- Kanyakumari – It is the southernmost city of peninsular/contiguous India and is a popular tourist destination

== See also ==
- Transport in Chennai
