= Valsan Koorma Kolleri =

Indian sculptor (born 1953)

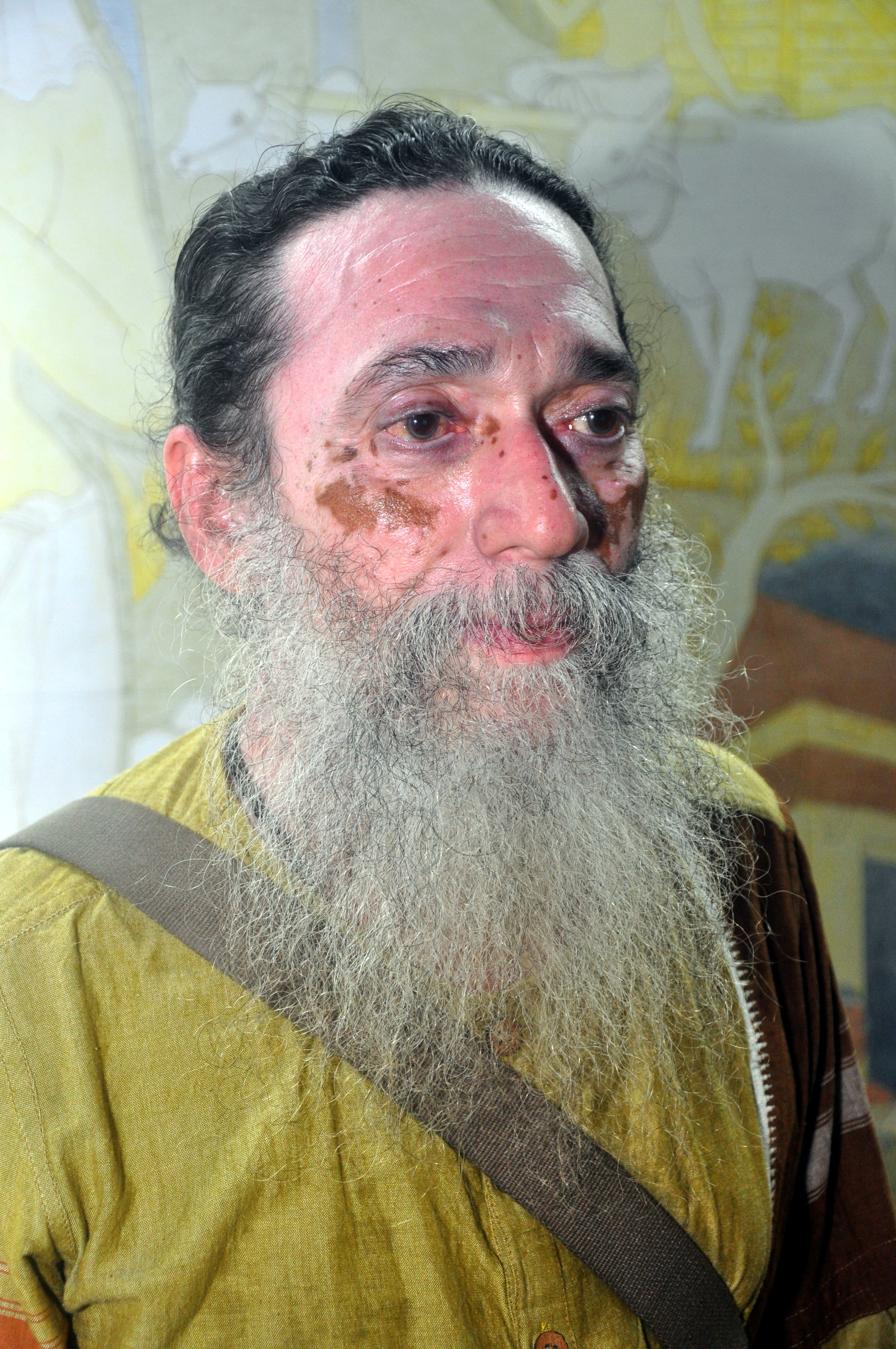
- Born: 1953 (age 72–73); Pattiam, Kerala

Valsan Koorma Kolleri (born 1953) is an Indian sculptor.

== Career ==
Born in Pattiam, Kerala, Kolleri studied at the École nationale supérieure des Beaux-Arts, Paris (1985–86), the Faculty of Fine Art, Maharaja Sayajirao University of Baroda (1976–79) and the Government College of Fine Arts, Chennai (1971–76).
