= Paris Viswanathan =

Indian painter

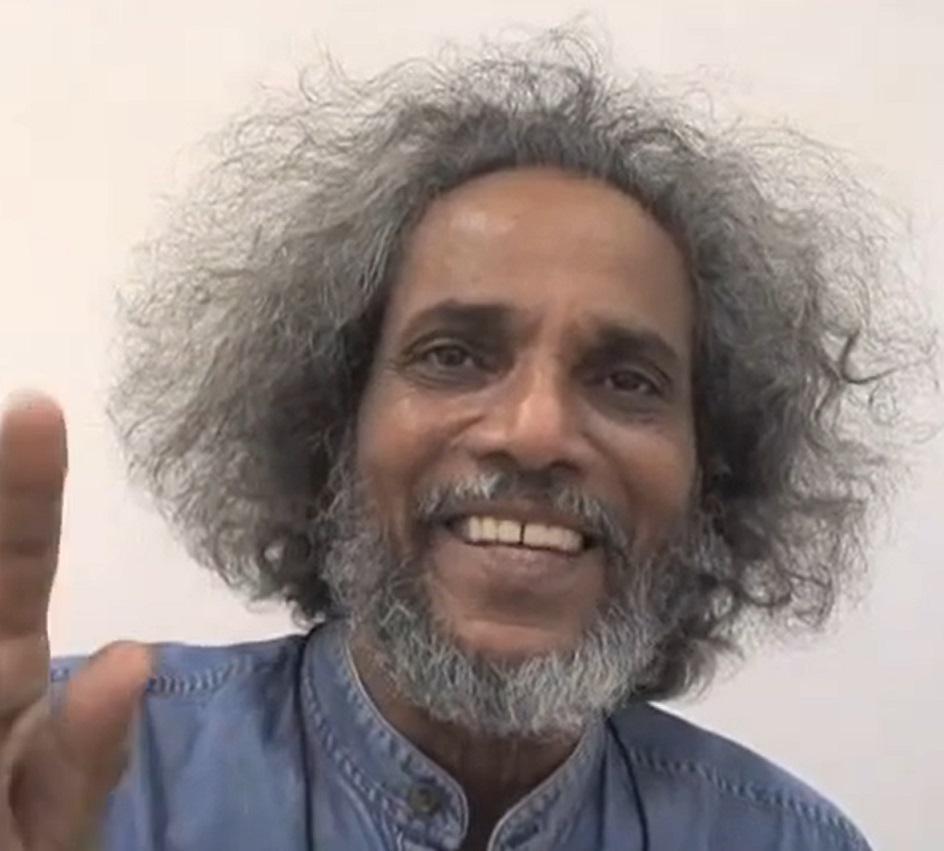
- Viswanathan in 2012
- Born: 1940 (age 85–86); Kadavoor, Kollam, Kerala, India
- Education: Government College of Fine Arts, Chennai
- Known for: Painter, Sculptor, filmmaker
- Spouse: Nadine Tarbouriech
- Awards: 1986 Festival dei Popoli Best Documentary Film Award; 2008 Kerala Lalithakala Akademi K. C. S. Paniker Award

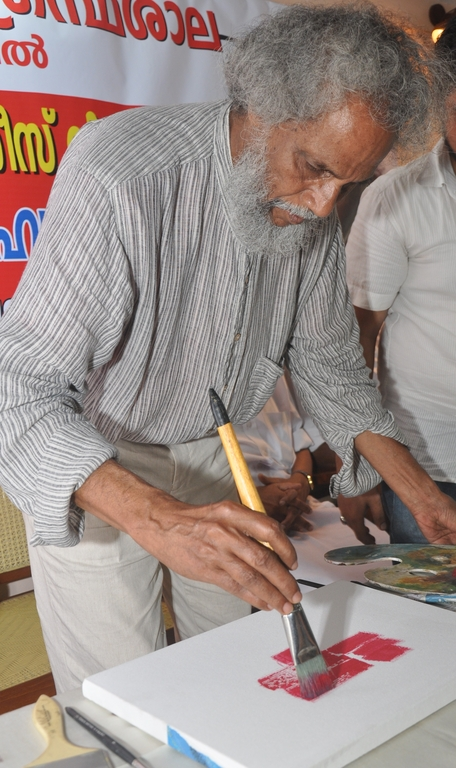
Viswanathan at work

Velu Viswanathan, popularly known as Paris Viswanathan (born 1 January 1940) is an Indian painter, sculptor and filmmaker. He is considered by many as one of the prominent modern painters in India. He is a recipient of the Best Documentary Film Award of the Festival dei Popoli, Florence and the K. C. S. Paniker Award of the Kerala Lalithakala

== Biography ==
V. Viswanathan was born in 1940 at Kadavoor, Kollam in the south Indian state of Kerala. After early education, he joined the Government College of Fine Arts, Chennai in 1960 where he had the opportunity to study under noted painter, K. C. S. Paniker. After securing a diploma from the institution in 1966, he assisted Paniker in setting up Cholamandal Artists' Village and moved into the village as one of the first batch of members. In 1967, he participated in Biennale de Paris; He settled in the city, the next year and has been living there since then.

== Legacy ==
Viswanathan has participated in many international and national art festivals, including Biennale de Paris and the International Biennale of Engraving at Ljubljana and several art galleries such as Galerie, Ved Aaven, Aarhus, Galerie de France, Galerie Stig Carlsson, Höganäs, Centre Georges Pompidou, Vadehra Art Gallery, New Delhi and National Gallery of Modern Art have staged his one man shows and retrospectives. He was also involved with the Art Rises for Kerala (ARK) initiative at the 2019 edition of the Kochi-Muziris Biennale where his paintings were auctioned to raise funds for the reconstruction activities of the Government of Kerala in the wake of the 2018 Kerala floods. He has also made a few films, starting with a series titled, The Pancha Bhoota consisting of 5 films, Ganga as well as a series titled Back to Elements.

The catalogue raisonné of the work of VISWANADHAN, always known and identified under this name and spelling, is being prepared by Nadine Tarbouriech member of the U.F.E - Union Française des Experts - in the categories of painting, cinema, photography and literature.

Viswanadhan work is represented in Paris and Brussels by Galerie Nathalie Obadiaand in New Delhi by Nature Morte Gallery

The Sharjah Biennial 16 "to carry" dedicates a full pavilion to the work of Viswnadhan - curator Natasha Ginwala.

== Awards and honours ==
Viswanathan received the award for the best documentary film at the Festival dei Popoli held at Florence, in 1986. Kerala Lalithakala Akademi awarded him the inaugural K. C. S. Paniker Award in 2008. He was also honoured with the Chevalier des arts et letters by the French Government in 2005. Got Raja Ravi Varma Award in 2018.
