= Syed Thajudeen =

Malaysian painter (born 1943)

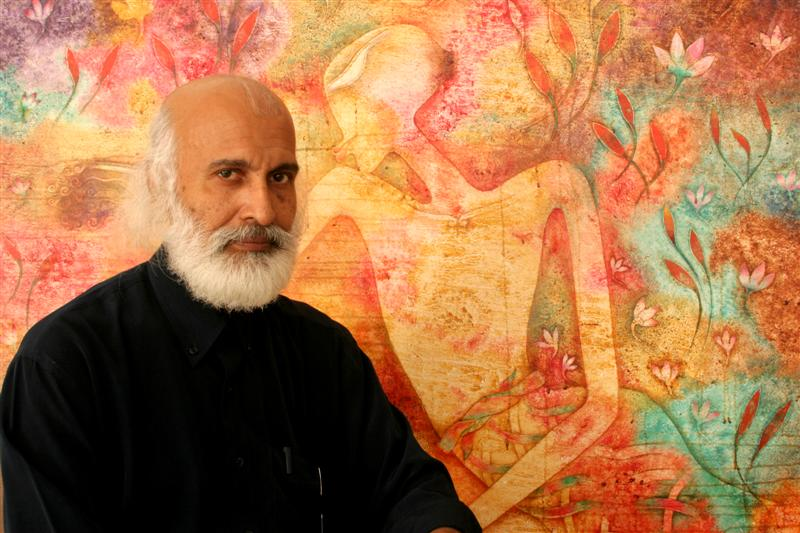
- Born: 23 August 1943; Alagankulam, India
- Education: Government College of Arts and Crafts, Madras, India (now known as Government College of Fine Arts, Chennai)
- Known for: Painting, Drawing
- Notable work: Ramayana (1972); The Beginning: Founding of Malacca (2002); The Eternal Love (2012)
- Movement: Cubism (early works), Surrealism, Figurative

Syed Thajudeen Shaik Abu Talib (born 23 August 1943) is a Malaysian painter. He is known for his large scale mural paintings of epic proportions set in period landscapes. A distinctive stylisation, romantic treatment of subject matter and the rich colours as in the Ajanta cave paintings of Maharashtra and of the Mughal (enriched from the wealth of Indian mythology) are apparent in his works. This, together with the traditional visual arts' integral connection with literature, music, dance, sculpture and philosophy, helped shape Syed's early works. His works, as individualistic as they are, attempt to evoke a state of rasa, or heightened mood that belongs to a larger tapestry and sensibility of Asian artistic traditions. In many instances where his favourite subject matters deal with women and love, they share the same archetypal symbols and metaphors.

== Life ==
He was born in 1943 in the village of Alagankulam in southern India. He spent his formative years as a student in Penang, Malaysia. He pursued his art education at the Government College of Arts and Crafts, Madras, India, graduating with a post diploma in Fine Arts in 1974.

Returning to Malaysia, he joined Institut Teknologi MARA as a lecturer in Fine Arts from 1974 to 1976. In 1977, Syed Thajudeen joined the United Asian Bank as a resident artist. His mastery in the figurative art is clearly manifested in his miniature artworks to his mural sized masterpieces. Although Syed Thajudeen’s stylization are influenced by the Bauhaus art of Paul Klee and his Indian education background, themes of his work are mostly based on the Malay culture and literature which can be seen in his Kebaya series and epic Malacca Sultanate series.

Syed Thajudeen has exhibited extensively around the world, including the USA, Belgium, UK, and China with 10 solo exhibitions under his belt to date. His works decorate the walls of the National Art Gallery of Malaysia, Singapore Art Museum, Beijing Olympic Museum, Galeri PETRONAS, corporate buildings and many private homes in Malaysia and abroad. In 2015, he was honoured by the Penang State Government by being invited to hold his retrospective at the Penang State Art Gallery & Museum. He has also served as a member of the Malaysian National Visual Arts Development Board.

== Selected Public collections ==
- National Art Gallery, Malaysia
- Singapore Art Museum, Singapore
- Olympic Museum, Beijing, China
- Galeri Petronas, Malaysia
- Bank Negara Museum & Art Gallery, Malaysia
- Penang State Museum & Art Gallery, Malaysia
- Muzium Pahang, Malaysia

== Selected exhibitions ==
=== Solo exhibitions ===
1975 – 1st Solo Exhibition, Penang State Museum and Art Gallery, Penang
1975 – 2nd Solo Exhibition, Samat Art Gallery, Kuala Lumpur
1997 – 3rd Solo Exhibition, Pelita Hati Art Gallery, Kuala Lumpur
2002 – Seroja, Sutra Gallery, Kuala Lumpur
2004 – Love and its Many Splendoured Images, Sutra Gallery, Kuala Lumpur
2006 – Cinta Tercipta… And there is Love…, National Art Gallery, Kuala Lumpur
2007 – Cinta Tercipta… and There is Love, Pelita Hati, Kuala Lumpur
2007 – Women in Kebaya : A Tribute to Datin Paduka Seri Endon Mahmood, Tanjung Art Gallery, Penang
2010 – Paintings on Love, KL Lifestyle Art Space @ Jalan Maarof, Kuala Lumpur
2015 – Retrospective, Penang State Museum & Art Gallery, Malaysia
2018 – Splendours of Love: The Art of Syed Thajudeen, Soka Gakkai Malaysia, Kuala Lumpur
2024 – Weaving Love & Faith, MOCA Muzium Pahang, Kuantan

=== Meta exhibitions ===
2020 – In between the Lines, The Bauhaus Gallery
2021 – Introspection, The Bauhaus Gallery
2021 – Roses of Malaysia: The expanded universe of the Kebaya series, The Bauhaus Gallery

=== Selected group exhibitions ===
1965 – Group Show for the Opening of Penang State Museum by Tun Sir Raja Uda, Malaysia
1970–74 – Annual Shows, Government College of Arts and Crafts, Madras, India
1978 – Malaysian Art 1965–78, Commonwealth Institute, London, UK
1979 – Salon Malaysia, National Art Gallery, Kuala Lumpur
1982 – ASEAN Mobile Exhibition, Kuala Lumpur/ Singapore/ Jakarta/ Manila/Bangkok
1983 – 2nd Art Biennale, Bangladesh
1985 – 12 Malaysian Artist Exhibition, Taiwan
1988 – Contemporary painting of Malaysia, Pacific Asia Museum, Pasadena, California, USA
1989 – 1st ASEAN travelling exhibition of painting, Photography and Children Art
1990 – National Open Show, National Art Gallery, Kuala Lumpur
1990 – Malaysian painting in Cologne, Germany
1990 – First Asian Symposium on Aesthetics Workshop and Exhibition
1991 – Asian International Exhibition, National Art Gallery, Kuala Lumpur
1991 – Annual Open Show, National Art Gallery, Kuala Lumpur
1992 – Malaysian paintings in Brussels, Belgium
1993 – Malaysian Art 1993, Petronas Art Gallery, Kuala Lumpur
1994 – Islamic Art, Petronas Art Gallery, Kuala Lumpur
1994 – Time and Space -with Indian artists, Menara Maybank
1995 – Man and spirituality, National Art Gallery, Kuala Lumpur
1995 – International Islamic Exhibition, Jakarta, Indonesia
1998 – Malaysia Artist Group Show 1998, Cultural Foundation, Abu Dhabi, UAE
1998 – Rupa Malaysia, Brunei Gallery, University of London, England
1999 – Malaysian Contemporary Art Exhibition, National Museum of Art, Beijing, China
2001 – Open show, National Art Gallery, Kuala Lumpur
2003 – 45 @45, National Art Gallery, Kuala Lumpur
2004 – Contemporary Art of Malaysia at the turn of the 21st Century, Guangdong Museum of Art, China
2007 – Merdeka 50: A Celebration of Malaysian Art, Islamic Art Museum, Kuala Lumpur
2007 – Between Generations: 50 Years Across Modern Art in Malaysia, UM, Kuala Lumpur and USM, Penang
2010 – World Expo Shanghai, China
2012 – Olympic Games Art Exhibition, London
2013 – China Malaysia Friendship Exhibition, China
2013 – M50, MAP, Kuala Lumpur
2013 – Wajah M50, Morne Gallery, Kuala Lumpur
2014 – ReImagiNation, Galeri Chandan, Kuala Lumpur
2015 – The Origin of Beauty, Busan Art Museum, Korea
2016 – Shah Alam Biennale, Malaysia
2016 – International Arts Invitational Exhibition, Taiwan
2016 – 8th Asian Art, Malaysia
2017 – Malaysia – China Cultural Art Exhibition, Malaysia

== Monographs ==
- Ibrahim, Ramli. 7 August 2002. Seroja: an exhibition of oil paintings and ink drawings by Syed Thajudeen. Sutra Gallery.2002
- Ibrahim, Ramli, "Cinta tercipta", Balai Senilukis Negara, 2006
- Ooi Kok Chuen, September 2015, “Syed Thajudeen Retrospective”, Penang State Museum, 2015
