= Namboothiri (artist) =

Indian painter and sculptor (1925–2023)

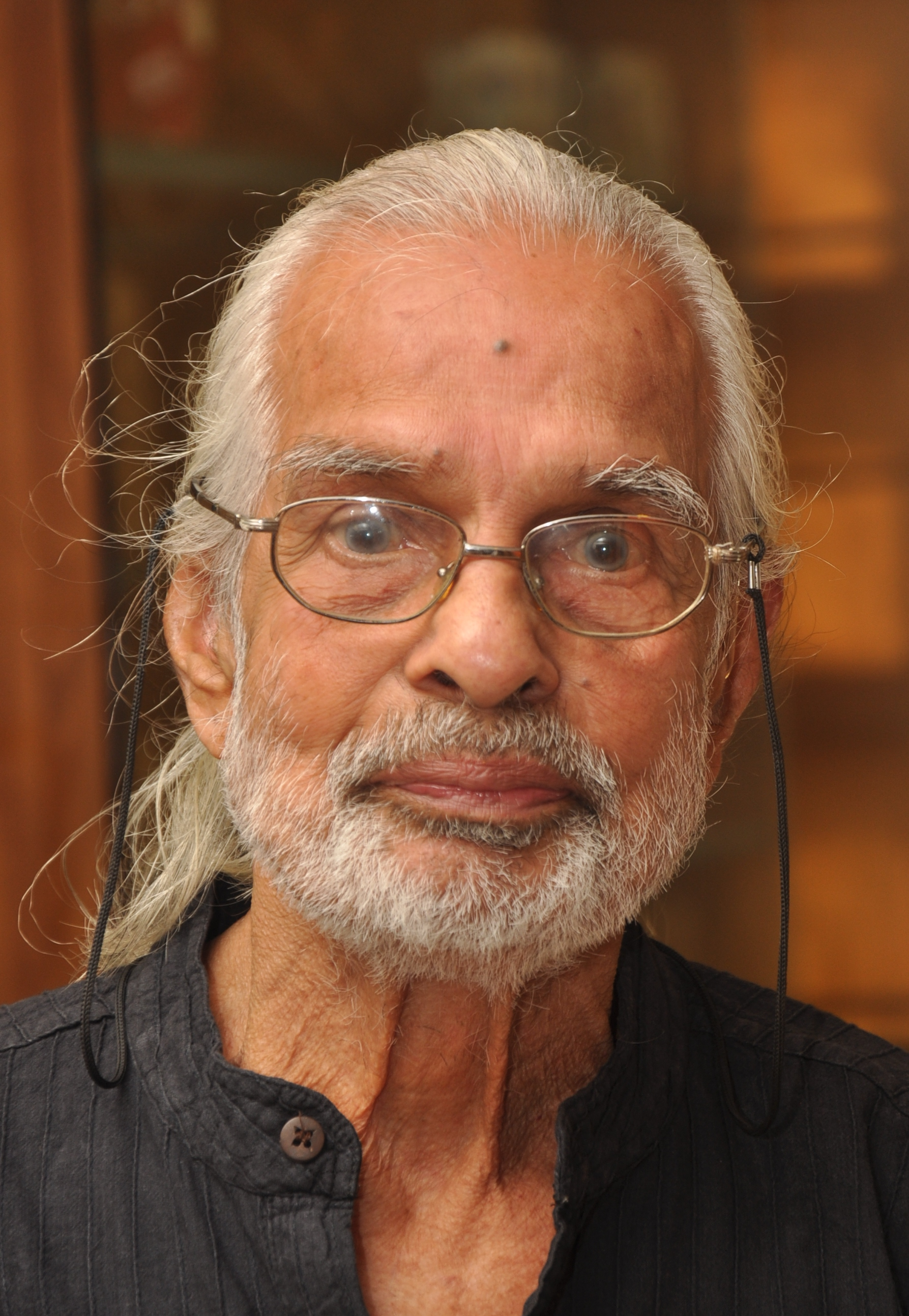
- Artist Namboothiri in 2011
- Born: K. M. Vasudevan Namboothiri; 13 September 1925; Ponnani, Madras Presidency, British India
- Died: 7 July 2023 (aged 97); Kottakkal, Malappuram, Kerala, India
- Other name: Artist Namboothiri
- Known for: Paintings, sculptures
- Spouse: Mrinalini
- Children: 2
- Awards: 1974 Kerala State Film Award for Best Art Director; 2003 Raja Ravi Varma Award; 2004 Bala Sahitya Award
- Patrons: K. C. S. Paniker; Debi Prasad Roy Chowdhury

Karuvattu Mana Vasudevan Namboothiri (13 September 1925 – 7 July 2023), better known as Artist Namboothiri or simply Namboothiri, was an Indian painter and sculptor, known for his line art and copper relief works. He illustrated for many Malayalam writers such as Thakazhy Shivasankara Pillai, Kesavadev, M. T. Vasudevan Nair, Uroob, S. K. Pottekkatt, Edasseri Govindan Nair, and V.K.N., and was one of the most prolific literary illustrators of India. He was also a chairman of the Kerala Lalithakala Akademi. The Akademi awarded him the Raja Ravi Varma Award in 2003. He was also a recipient of the Kerala State Film Award for Best Art Director.

== Biography ==
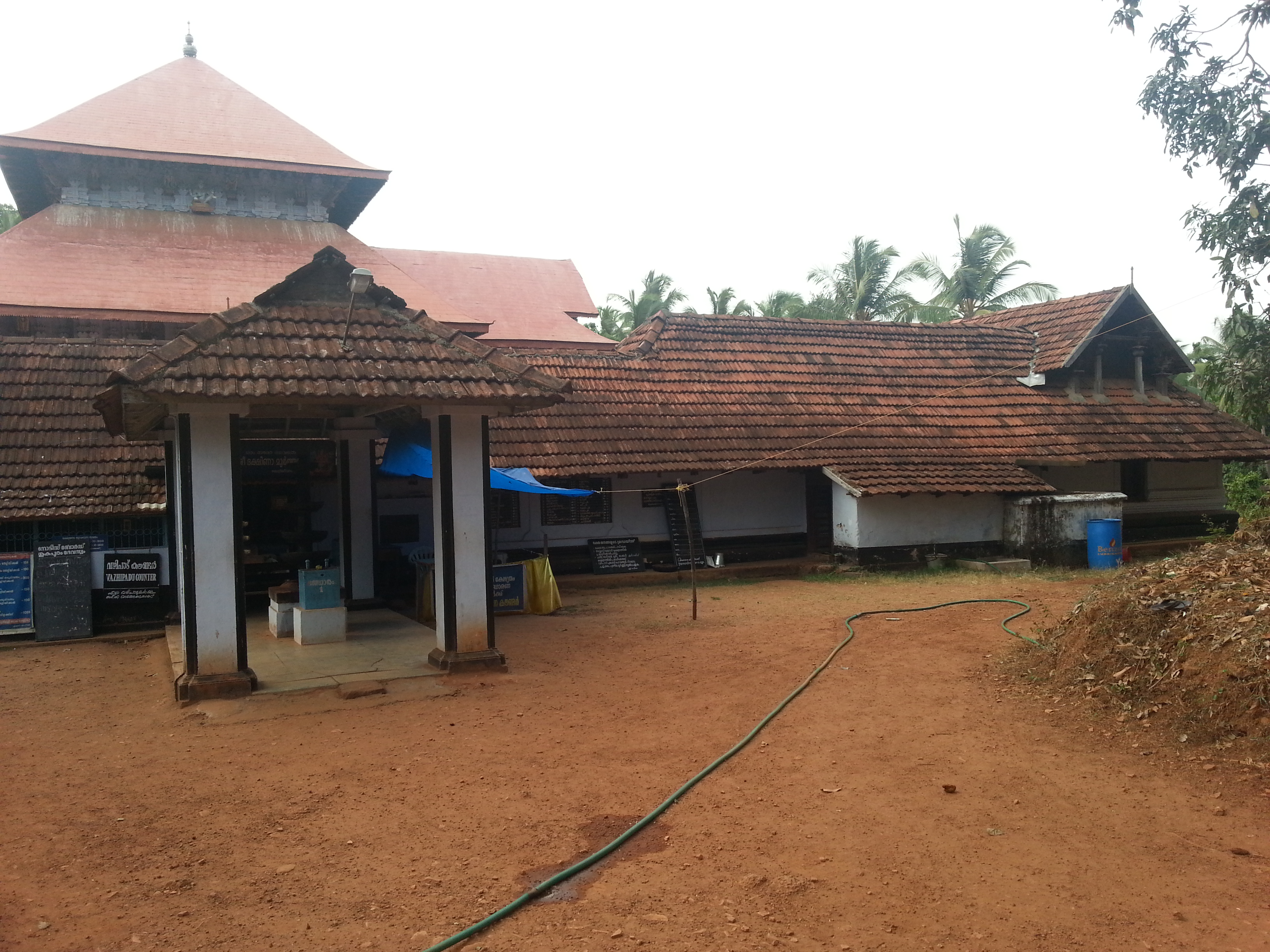
Sculptures at Sukapuram temple were early inspirations for Namboothiri

Namboothiri was born at Karuvattu Mana in Ponnani, in Malappuram district of the south Indian state of Kerala to Parameshwaran Namboothiri and Sreedevi Antharjanam, as their eldest son. During his childhood, he was influenced by the sculptures at the Sukapuram temple near his house. "I had this urge to draw and mould sculptures after seeing these," Namboothiri said. In order to pursue education in art, he moved to Chennai, with financial assistance from Krishnan Namboodiri of Varikkasseri Mana. There, he joined the Government College of Fine Arts, Chennai where he had the opportunity to study under Debi Prasad Roy Chowdhury, the founder and principal of the institution, and S. Dhanapal. It was during this period that he came into contact with K. C. S. Paniker, who would exercise influence over the young artist.

Namboothiri secured two diplomas, one in fine arts and the other in applied arts, from the Government College of Fine Arts in 1954 and after staying at Cholamandal Artists' Village of K. C. S. Paniker where he completed a six-year course in one year, he returned to Kerala to join the newspaper Mathrubhumi as a staff artist in 1960. He stayed with Mathrubhumi until 1982, illustrating the literary works of most of the major writers in Malayalam, including Thakazhi Sivasankara Pillai, Kesavadev, M. T. Vasudevan Nair, Uroob, S. K. Pottekkatt, Edasseri Govindan Nair, and V.K.N. In Mathrubhumi, he published Naniyammayum Lokavum, which became a popular pocket cartoon series. In 1982, he moved to news magazine Kalakaumudi where he provided illustrations before shifting to The New Indian Express's newsweekly, Samakalika Malayalam Vaarika.

Namboothiri was married to Mrinalini and the couple had two sons, Parameshawaran and Vasudevan. The family lived in Naduvattam in Malappuram district.

Namboothiri died on 7 July 2023, at age 97.

== Legacy ==
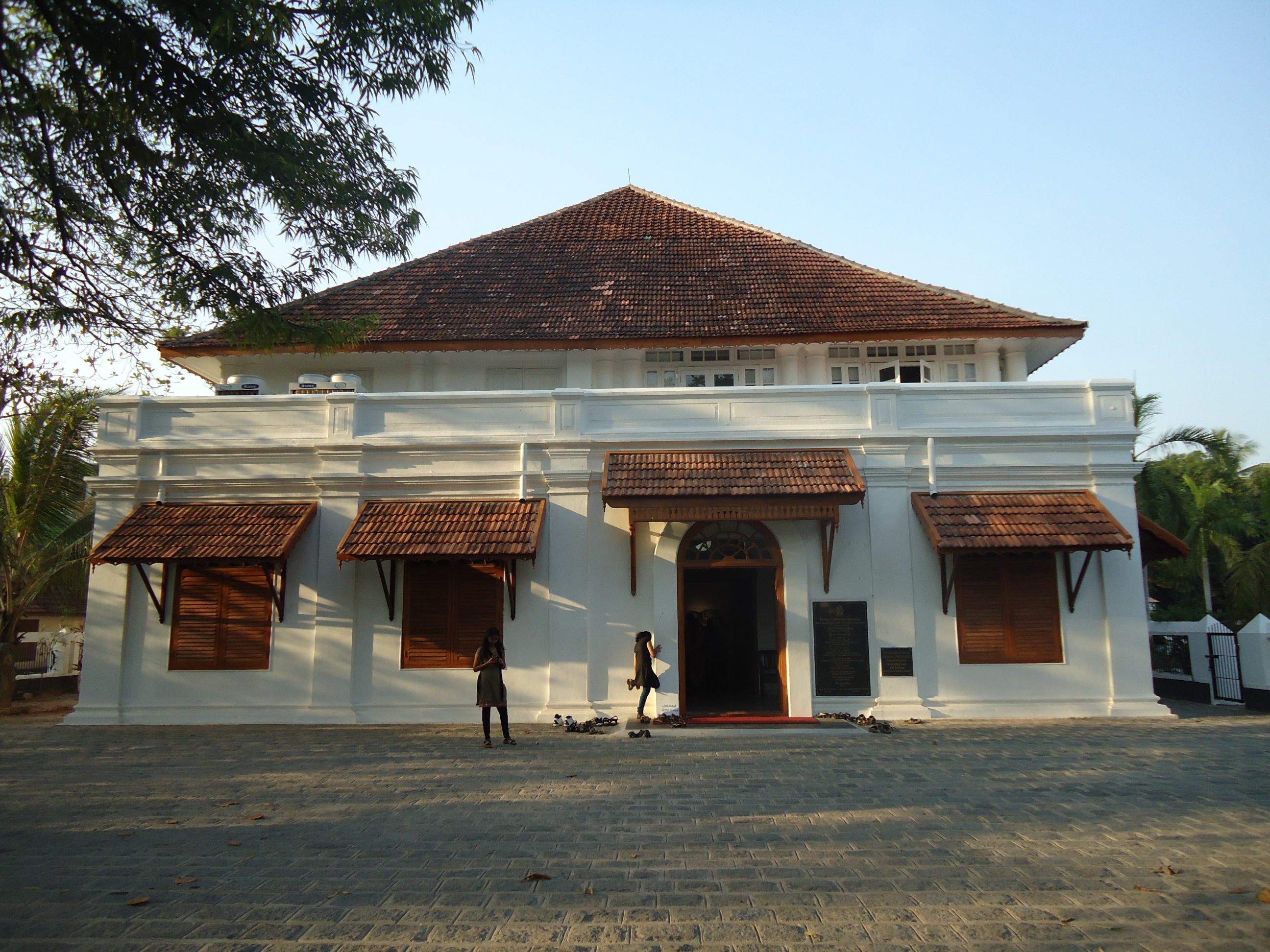
Kerala Lalithakala Akademi Durbar Hall Ground Art Gallery

One of Namboothiri's first professional assignments was during his Chennai days, when he assisted K. C. S. Paniker to complete an oversize painting for the Indian Railways. One of the most prolific literary illustrators of India, he turned to copper relief work after resigning from Mathrubhumi and soon organized an exhibition consisting of 12 relief works. Later, he made some of his most notable drawings at Kalakaumudi when he illustrated Randamoozham of M. T. Vasudevan Nair; he stated later that these illustrations provided him with satisfaction. Namboothiri's illustrations of his characters prompted V.K.N. to call the artist as the Paramashivan of line sketches (The Lord Shiva of line drawings). He was also a proponent of "finger painting". Among his copper relief works, he has created a series based on various events from Mahabharata, entitled Lohabharata, and another based on Parayi Petta Panthirukulam. He had created a few large sculptures for Cholamandal which include Modern Family on a Scooter and Maithuna as well as a 500 ft (150 m) long outdoor drawing featuring incidents from the Indian freedom movement.

Namboothiri had served as the chairman of the Kerala Lalitakala Academy twice, and it was during his tenure that the academy constructed and moved to an owned building in Thrissur. His contributions were also reported in the conversion of the Durbar Hall Ground in Kochi into an art gallery. He had embarked on a self-appointed mission of pictorially documenting the cities of Kerala. The project, entitled Nagarangal (The Cities), began with Kochi.

== Honours ==
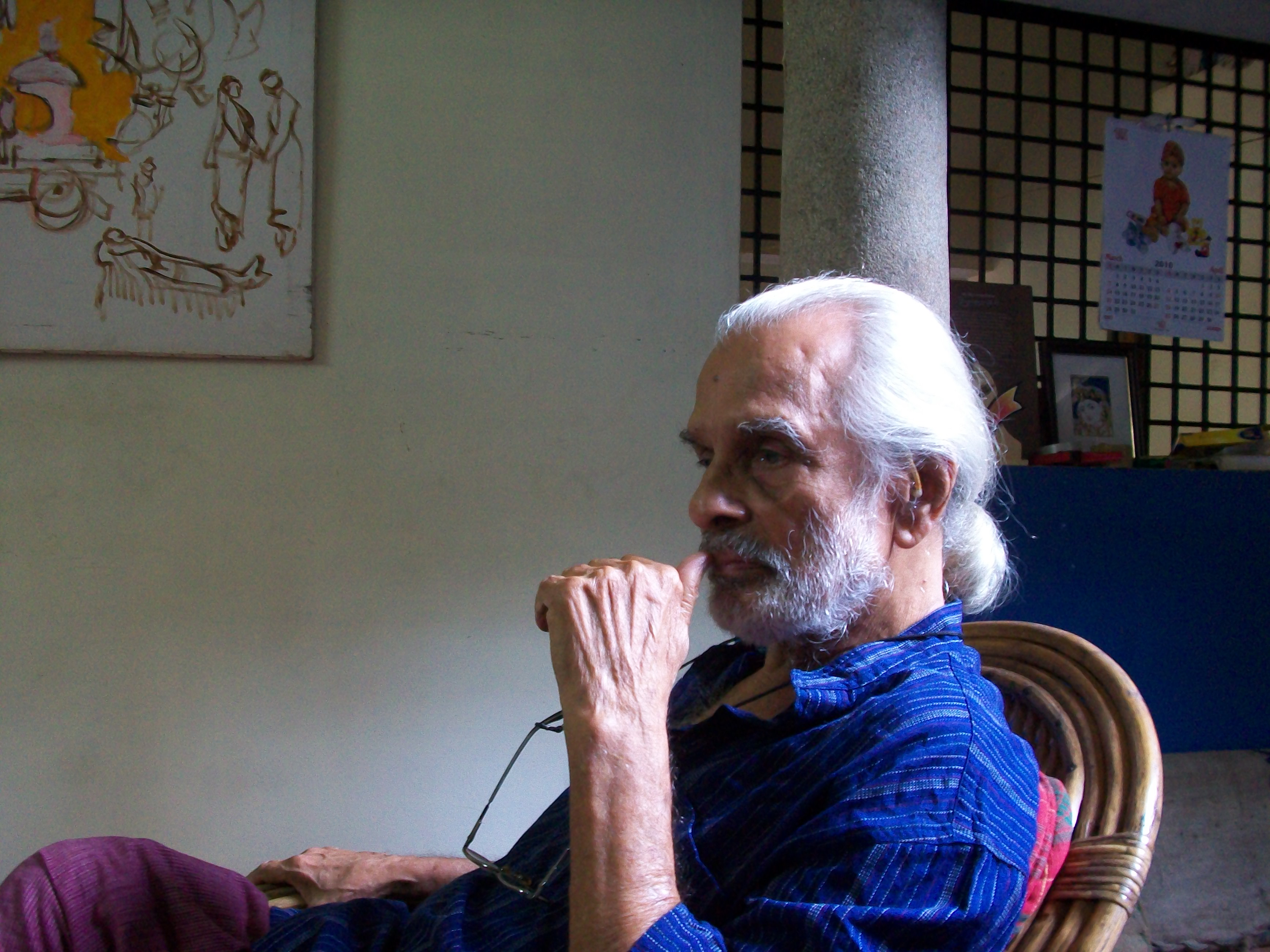
Artist Namboothiri

Film director and cartoonist G. Aravindan was a friend of Namboothiri, and when Aravindan made his debut movie, Uttarayanam, he invited Namboothiri to work as the art director of the film. (Note: He had also been involved with two more films, Kanchana Sita by Aravindan, and Njan Gandharvan, the 1991 film by P. Padmarajan in which the costume of the Gandharvan was designed by Namboothiri.) The film went on to receive five Kerala State Film Awards in 1974, including the Award for Best Art Director for Namboothiri. Kerala Lalithakala Akademi awarded Namboothiri the Raja Ravi Varma Award in 2003 and he became the third recipient of the award which was instituted in 2001. The Kerala State Institute for Children's Literature awarded him the Bala Sahitya Award for best illustration for his work in Kuttikalude Ramayanam (Ramayana for children) in 2004.

A documentary on the life of the artist, Namboodiri-Varayude Kulapathy (Namboodiri — The Emperor of Lines) was made by Ask Movies. The 44-minute documentary film, directed by Binuraj Kalapeedhom, covers the artist's life from his childhood, through his Chennai days, and to his eighties. Varayum Vaakkum, (Lines and Words) is a book published by N. P. Vijayakrishnan, compiling Namboothiri's reminiscences and some of his drawings. Namboothiriyude Sthreekal (The Women of Namboothiri) is another book published by Vijayakrishan and includes several of the artist's line drawings of women and a foreword by Mohanlal.

== Publications ==
- Randamoozham by M. T. Vasudevan Nair, illustrated by Namboothiri (Current Books). ISBN 978-8122613704
- Calicut: the City of Truth revisited by M. G. S. Narayanan, illustrations by Artist Namboodiri and Madanan, 2006 (University of Calicut). ISBN 9788177481044
- Lore and Legends of Kerala: Selections from Kottarathil Sankunni's Aithihyamala, translated from Malayalam by T. C. Narayan, illustrated by C. N. Karunakaran and Namboodiri, 2009 (Malayala Manorama & Oxford University Press). ISBN 9780195698893
- Antharjanam: Memoirs of a Nambooodiri Woman by Devaki Nilayamgode, translated from Malayalam by Indira Menon and Radhika P. Menon, illustrations by Namboodiri, 2011 (Oxford University Press). ISBN 978-0198074168
- Sketches: the memoir of an artist, by K.M. Vasudevan Namboodiri, foreword by M.T. Vasudevan Nair, translated from the Malayalam by Gita Krishnankutty, 2019 (Penguin Books India). ISBN 978-0143449645

== Gallery ==
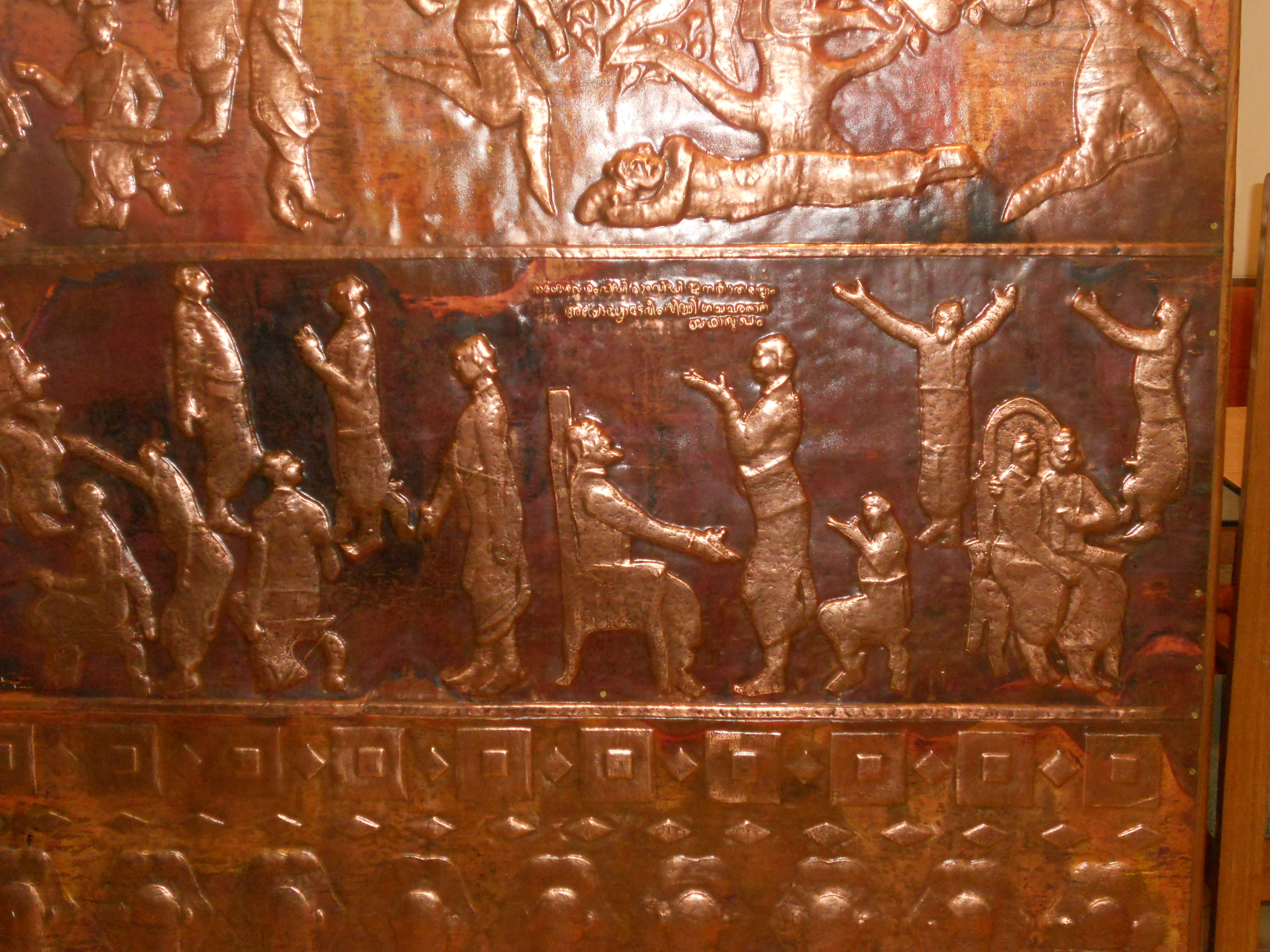
Metal relief 1

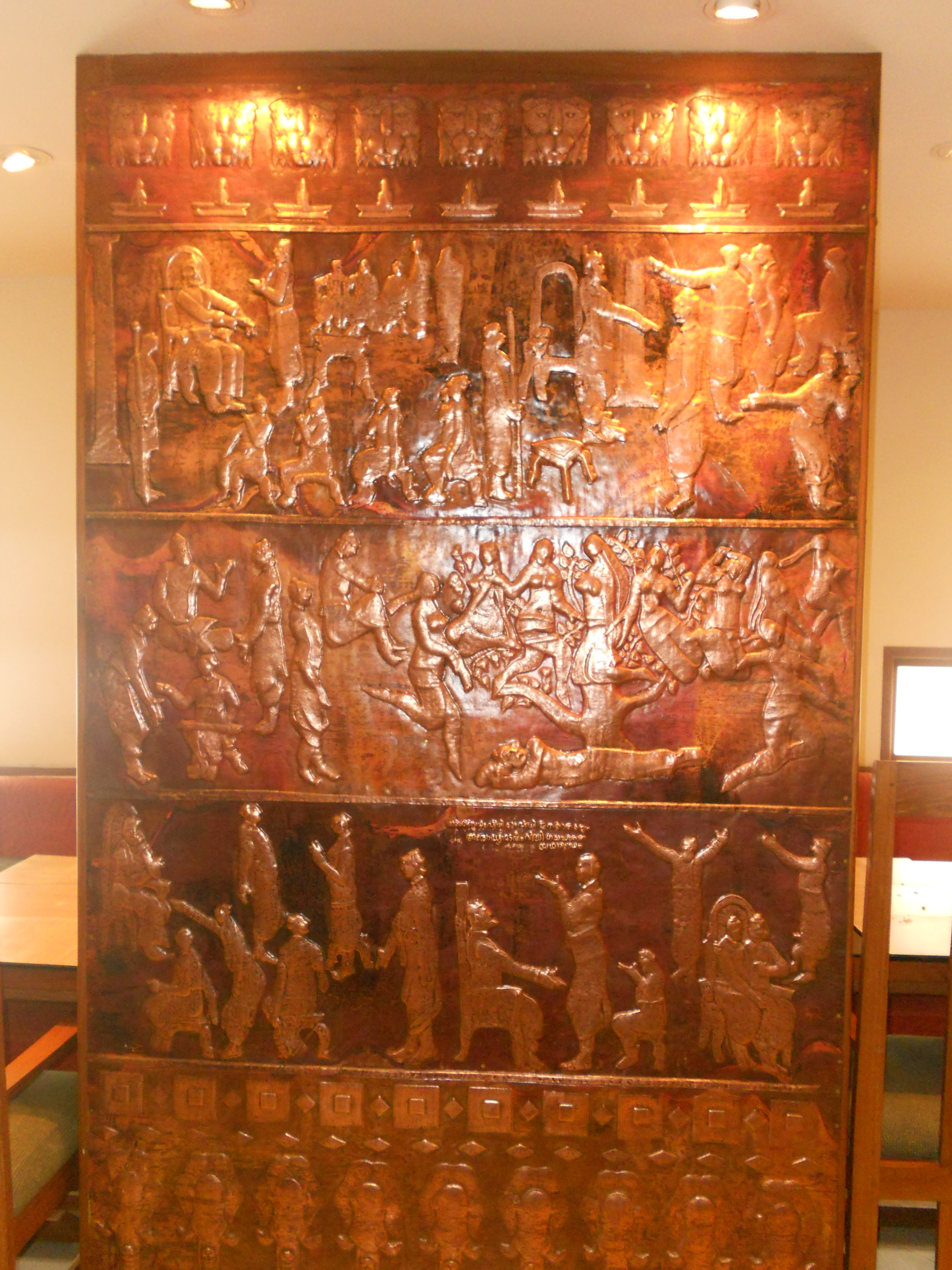
Metal relief 2

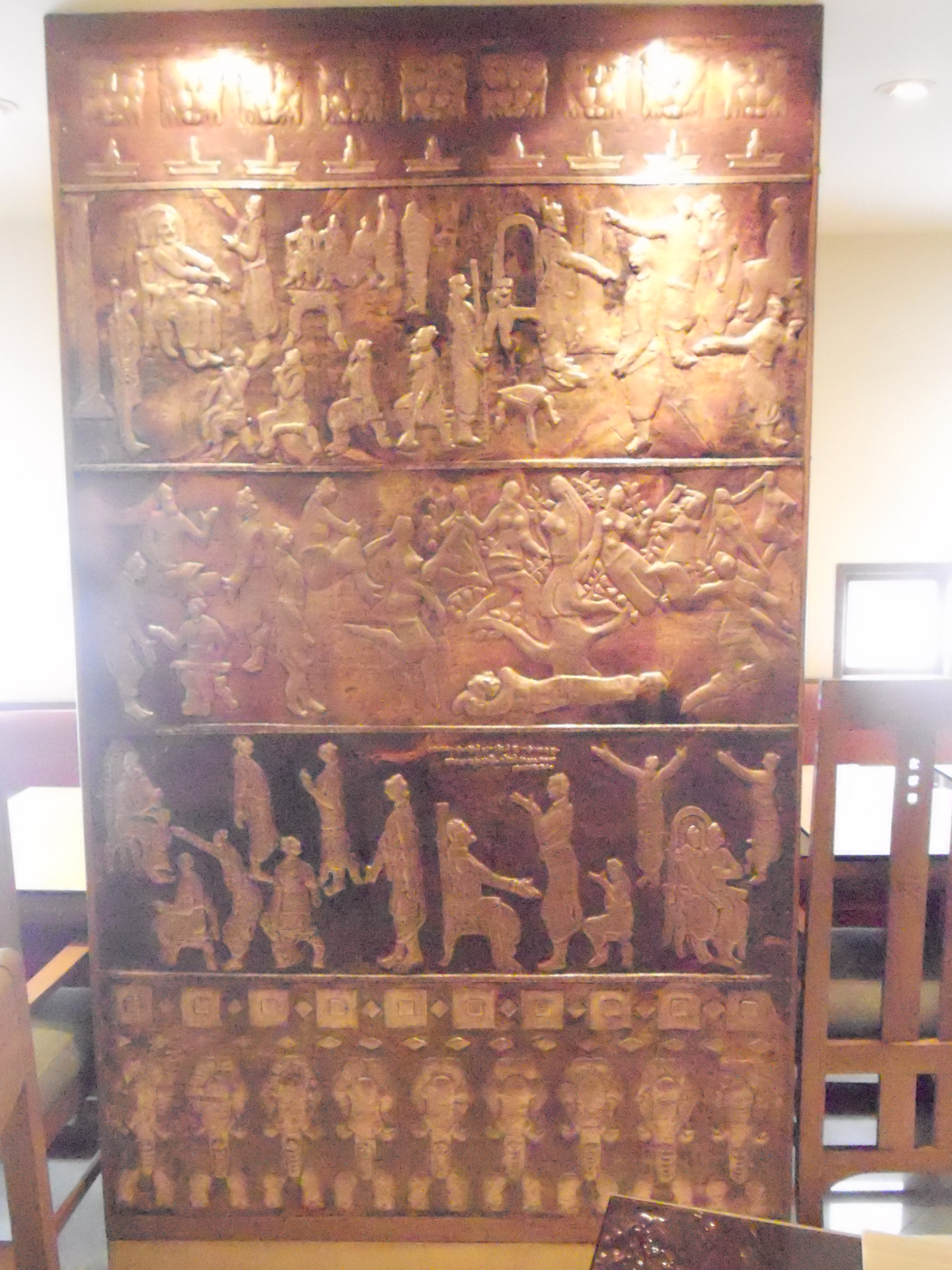
Metal relief 3

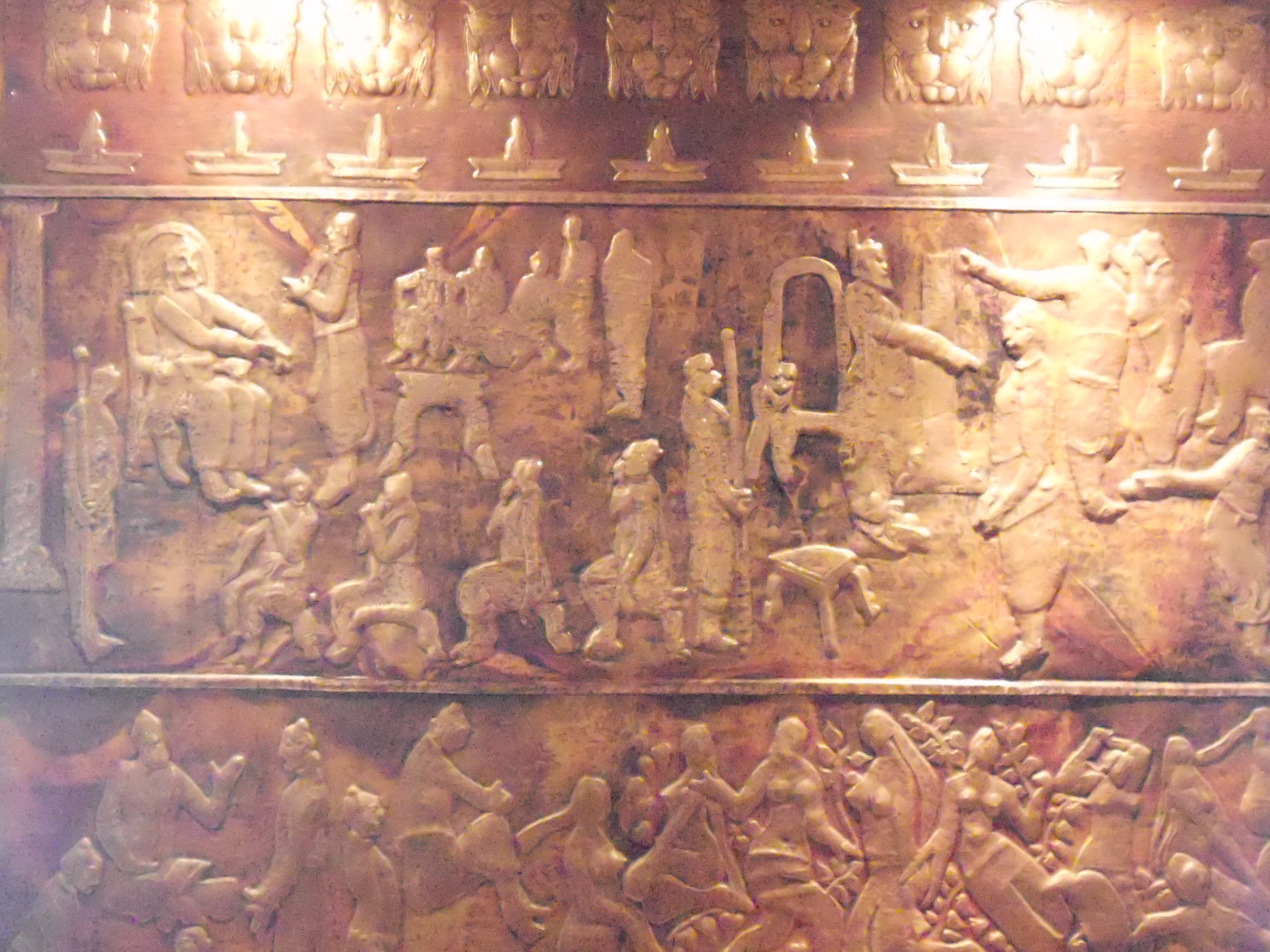
Metal relief 5

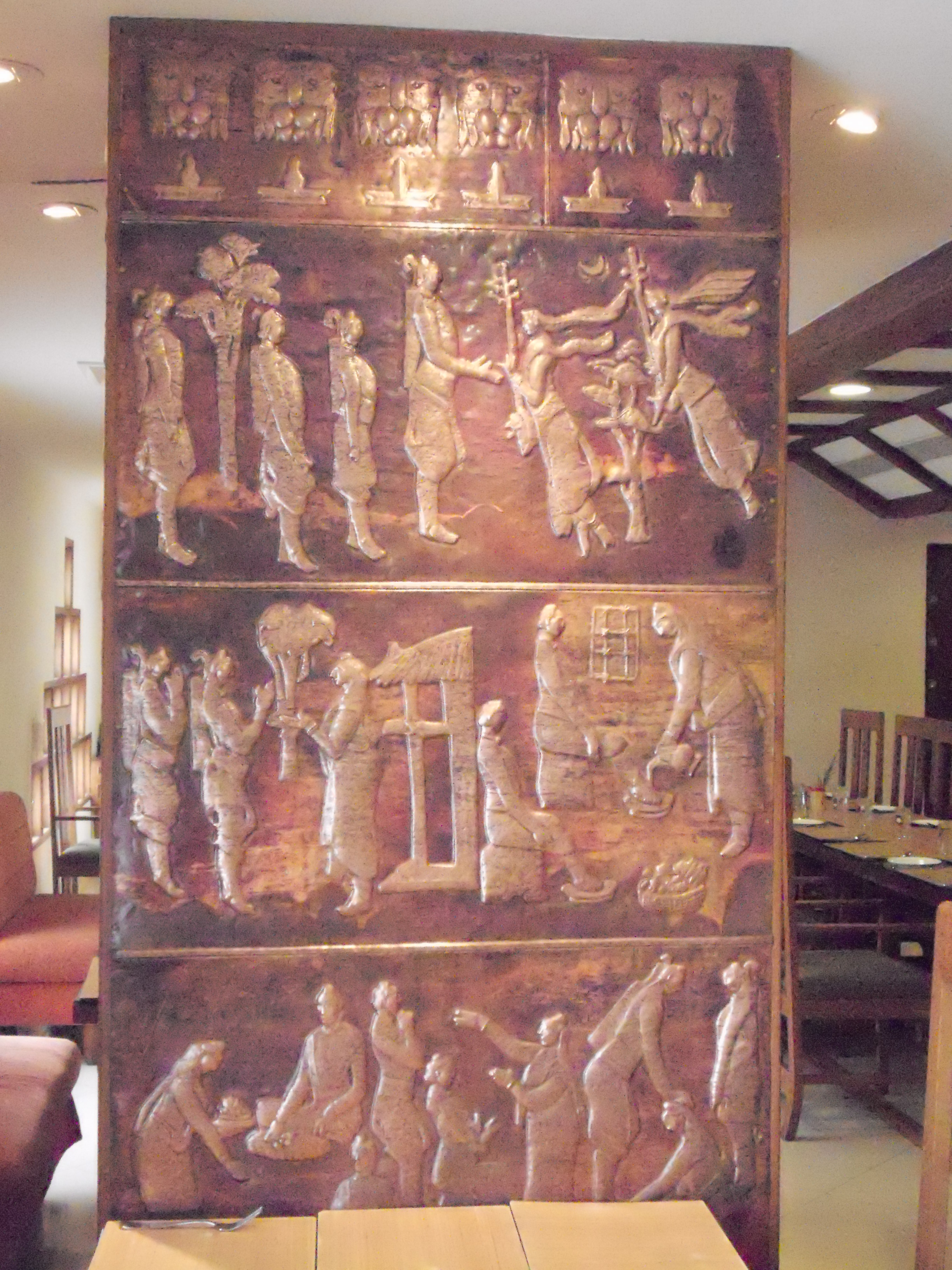
Metal relief 6
