= Cholamandal Artists' Village =

Artists' commune in Chennai, India

Coordinates: 12°55′20″N 80°15′07″E

General information
- Type: Artists' commune, Museum, Gallery
- Architectural style: Modernist
- Location: Injambakkam, Chennai, Tamil Nadu, India
- Current tenants: 20+ resident painters and sculptors
- Inaugurated: April 1966 (60 years ago)
- Owner: Artists Handicrafts Association

Technical details
- Grounds: 20 acres

Website
- cholamandalartistvillage.com

Cholamandal Artists' Village is an artists' commune in Chennai, the capital of Tamil Nadu, India. Established in 1966, it is the largest artists' commune in India. The community is located in the southern coastal neighborhood of Injambakkam. Its artists are credited for the Madras Movement of Art (1950s–1980s), which brought modernism to art in South India. Their work is widely recognized as some of the best art produced in postwar India and is shown regularly in galleries across the country. Several Cholamandal artists have also shown in Europe, the United States and South America.

The community has over 20 resident painters and sculptors, who live as a community and pool their skills. They run the Artists Handicrafts Association, a cooperative which manages the village and sale of works through the permanent exhibition at the complex, which includes paintings, sketches, terra-cotta/stone/metal sculptures, batiks and handicrafts etc., making the village a self-supporting entity.

The community was founded by K. C. S. Paniker, the principal of the Madras School of Arts, along with his students and a few artists associated with the college. It used the `art-meets-craft' approach where artists made handicrafts for a living as they pursued their art. By the 1970s, the village became self-sufficient and grew into one of the most important meeting places for international artists in India. Today, it is one of the few artist-driven movements in India. Four decades on, it is one of the few artists' colonies in the world to survive successfully and its foundation remains one of the "10 biggest art moments" in India.

== History ==
Most of the original founding creative artists, painters and sculptors were students and artists associated with the Government School of Arts and Crafts, Chennai (Madras School of Arts), where K.C.S. Paniker, noted metaphysical and abstract painter, was principal 1957 to 1967. These artists desired to form a congenial space for practising their art; 38 of them got together and formed the 'Artists Handicrafts Association' (AHA) in 1963 initially to sell the works of artists.

Gradually, the artists started working together, producing handicrafts in their spare time. They were among the first in the country to produce batik fabric; proceeds of their first batik exhibition went into buying the 8.5 acres (34,000 m^{2}) of land in 1966, which was to make up the village. By now K.C.S. Paniker had retired and founded the artists commune in April 1966.

The community was named after the Chola dynasty, which is known to have encouraged arts and ruled the region, 9-13th century CE — called Cholamandalam in Tamil, which literally translated as the realm of the Cholas. Chola also lends its name to the Coromandel Coast of Bay of Bengal, which is a short walk from the village. Paniker was "worried that his students might deviate from art due to financial compulsions".

In the same year six artists moved into live and work on their own land. In the 60s, while they could hardly sell their paintings, avant garde wood and leather work, batik, ceramics and metal craft, they found a good market. This sustained them, while the local buyers were familiarized to modernism, which their art represented.

Electricity was provided in 1968 and till 1972 the mud road ended at Muttukadu. The village was on a lonely, bumpy road, now known as the East Coast Road highway to Mahabalipuram, from Adyar. Over the years, the community built its houses, studios, exhibition gallery, theatre, workshop and kitchen, which it jointly owned along with all the infrastructure of the village.

It nurtured artists such as J. Sultan Ali, K. M. Gopal S. Kanniappan, K. Ramanujam, M. Reddeppa Naidu, S. P. Jayakar, K. R. Harie, P. S. Nandan, Akkitham Narayanan, Namboothiri, Paris Viswanathan, D. Venkatapathy, Haridasan, S. Nanda Gopal, S. G. Vasudev, K. Jayapala Panicker, Gopinath, Senathipathy, M. V. Devan and Richard Jesudas. Soon they formed a cooperative to look after the village and built a gallery, which displayed and sold their works; 20% of their sales went to the ‘Cholamandal Artists Handicrafts Association’, which used the funds for village upkeep. In time the cooperative became self-sufficient and held exhibitions of their work in major cities of India.

K. C. S. Paniker died in 1977. By this time the module had proven sustainable. Over the years, work done by the artists at the village, initiated a period in south Indian art called the 'Madras Movement', which brought modernism to south Indian art. The Progressive Painters’ Association (P.P.A.), one of the oldest art associations in India founded by Paniker in Chennai in 1944; it was inactive for many year after Paniker's death. The association was revived in 2006 and a new committee formed. It is now being carried forward by artists at the village and an annually elected general council of members administers Cholamandal. The village continues to produce artists of great talent such as S. Ravi Shankar, A. Selveraj and Shailesh B.O. amongst many others.

== Cholamandal Centre for Contemporary Art ==
During his last days Paniker had offered his oeuvre to the Madras government on the condition that a separate gallery be created for his work. When no response came from the government, the Trivandrum Art Gallery took up the offer and now houses an important collection of Paniker's work. The artists at the village wanted a place to display the work of the Madras Movement, thus idea of the art museum took place.

The artists raised money from the private sector to fund a museum in the village, which would house a permanent collection of artworks representative of the Madras Movement. While the initial design was made by a visiting Dutch couple, the design for the art centre was made by architects Sheila Sri Prakash of Shilpa Architects and M. V. Devan. As the project gathered momentum help came in from artists and corporates alike.

After three and half years of construction the building was finished — thus started a long search for works that exemplified the Madras Movement, which flourished between the early 50s and the 80s. Eventually about 60 per cent of the works were donated by senior artists and the rest were given on extended loan by art collectors around the country.

The Cholamandal Centre for Contemporary Art opened on 1 February 2009. It has a 'Museum of the Madras Movement', which display works of prominent artists of the movement (apart from that of Paniker) including J. Sultan Ali, K. M. Gopal, M. Senathipathi, A. P. Santhanaraj, P.S. Nandhan, S. G. Vasudev, K.V. Haridasan, Thota Tharani, sculptor S. Nandagopal. The centre has two commercial galleries, 'Labernum' and 'Indigo', that can be rented free of commission charge, an art book store, and a craft shop. It is surrounded by tree-shaded sands which sport an international sculpture garden, displaying sculptures made by visiting artists from across India and the world through the decades.

== Facilities ==
Today, the village houses art galleries, museums, and an open-air theatre for dance and theatre performances. The original Artists Handicrafts Association is still in charge of the colony, and Paniker's son, sculptor S. Nandagopal, is the secretary of the village. Out of the original 40 artists, many are no more, and some have moved out, only 21 remain today. Cholamandal does not accept new members, though it has at least a dozen artists living or working there at any time, plus many artists-in-residence are at work.

The village is open daily from 10am to 5pm. It is 10-minute walking distance from the Golden Beach. Local transport is easily available, and the Chennai International Airport is the nearest airport.
