= Kottivakkam =

- Neighbourhood
- Location within Chennai Location within Tamil Nadu Location within India
- Coordinates: 12.97°N 80.258°E
- Country: India
- State: Tamil Nadu
- District: Chennai
- Taluk: Sholinganallur
- Metro: Chennai

Population (2001)
  - Total: 13,914

Languages
  - Official: Tamil
- Time zone: UTC+5:30 (IST)
- PIN: 600 041
- Telephone code: 91-44
- Vehicle registration: TN-07

Kottivakam is a locality in the south of Chennai in Chennai district in the Indian state of Tamil Nadu. Kottivakkam is included with the Chennai Corporation.

== Demographics ==
As of 2011 India census, Kottivakkam had a population of 20,217. Males constitute 10,222 of the population and females 9,995. As of 2001 India census Kottivakkam has an average literacy rate of 71%, higher than the national average of 59.5%: male literacy is 78%, and female literacy is 64%. In Kottivakkam, 10% of the population is under 6 years of age.

This suburb (near Chennai) extends from the Bay of Bengal (ECR) to Rajiv Gandhi Salai, the IT corridor of the city, thus enjoying a boom in real estate prices.

Kottivakkam has two prominent schools "Nellai Nadar Matric Hr Sec School" and Manthan Vidyashram which is a recent addition

Prominent residents include several IAS officers, judges, and film actors and actresses.

== Education ==
- Vruksha International School of Montessori
