= Government College of Fine Arts, Chennai =

Art school in Chennai, India

Government College of Fine Arts
- Established: 1850; 176 years ago
- Affiliations: Tamil Nadu Music and Fine Arts University
- Location: Chennai, Tamil Nadu, India; 13°04′49″N 80°15′57″E
- Campus: Urban

The Government College of Fine Arts (initially known as the Madras School of Art) in Chennai is the oldest art institution in India. The institution was established in 1850 by surgeon Alexander Hunter as a private art school. In 1852, after being taken over by the government, it was renamed as the Government School of Industrial Arts. In 1962, it was renamed as the Government School of Arts and Crafts and the Government College of Arts and Crafts, before finally being renamed as present.

== History ==
During British rule in India, the crown found that Madras had many talented and artistic minds. As the British had also established a settlement in and around Madras, George Town was chosen to establish an institute that would cater to the artistic expectations of the royals in London. At first traditional artists were employed to produce furniture, metalwork, and curios, and their work was sent to the royal palaces of the Queen. The institute established itself as the first school of art in India, predating the University of Madras. The school was located at Popham's Broadway. In 1852, it was shifted to its present premises, a four-acre campus on Poonamallee High Road.

In 1928, Debi Prasad Roy Chowdhury joined as its vice-principal and in 1929, he became its first Indian principal. He was the principal until 1957. He was succeeded by K.C.S. Paniker. Later, a number of noted artists held the role of principal, including R. Krishna Rao, S. Dhanapal, K. L. Munuswamy, A. P. Santhanaraj and C. J. Anthony Doss.

In 1966, former principal K.C.S. Paniker, along with his students and some artists associated with the college, founded the Cholamandal Artists' Village, near Chennai, which is still considered one of the '10 biggest art moments' in India.

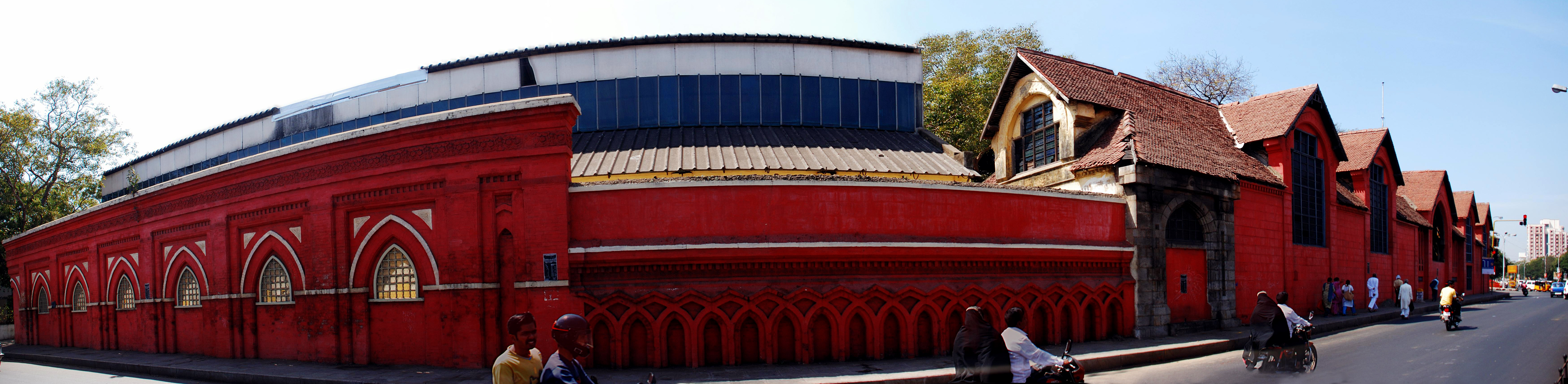
Panoramic view of Government Fine Arts, Chennai

== Courses offered ==
Government College of fine arts, Chennai - offers Bachelor and Master degrees [with Faculty of Engineering, University of Chennai] in fine arts, Courses Offered in Visual communication, Painting, Sculpture, Textile Design, Ceramics and Print Making [graphic arts].

== Notable alumni ==
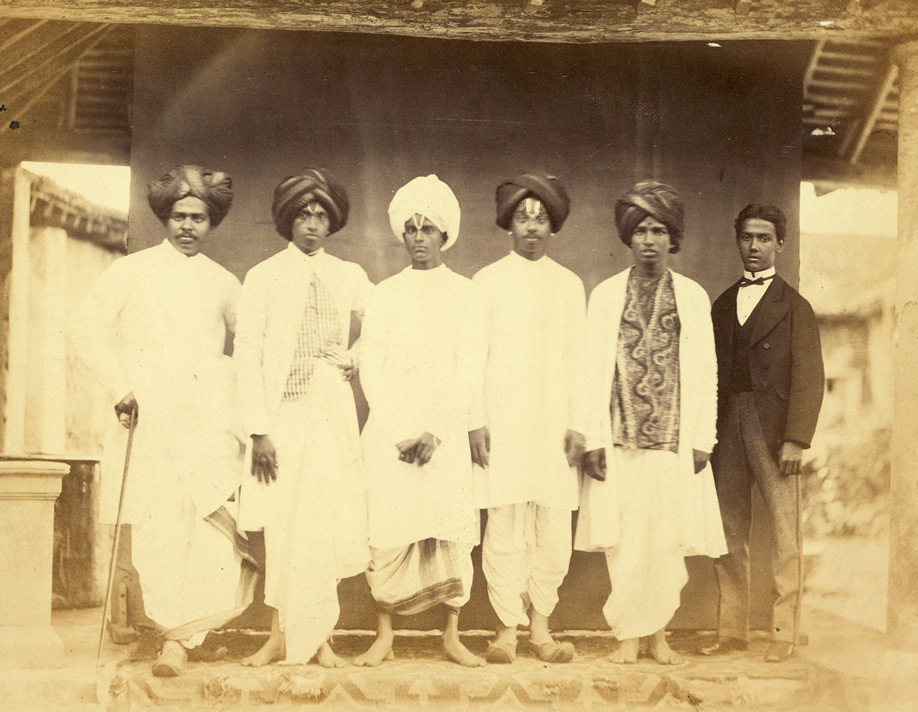
Six prize students for the year 1865 from the University of Madras photographed by a photographer from the Madras School of Industrial Arts.

- Debi Prasad Roy Chowdhury (sculpture)
- K. C. S. Paniker
- K.M. Adimoolam (drawing and painting)
- T. Viswanathan (Vice Principal) (Painting and Visual Communication)
- Kanayi Kunjiraman (sculpture)
- Namboothiri (painting and sculpture)
- Paris Viswanathan (painting and filmmaking)
- T. K. Padmini (painting)
- Trotsky Marudu (drawing and painting)
- Ebenezer Sunder Singh (painting and sculpture)
- Sivakumar (drawing, painting, and acting)
- Syed Thajudeen (figurative artist)
- D. R. K. Kiran (art director, actor)
- Manobala (director)
- Saran (director)
- Pa. Ranjith (director)
- Jacki (Art Director)
