= K. C. S. Paniker =

Indian metaphysical and abstract painter (1911-1977)

- Born: 31 May 1911; Veliyankode, Malabar District, British India (present day Malappuram, Kerala, India)
- Died: 16 January 1977 (aged 65); Madras, Tamil Nadu, India
- Occupation: Abstract painter
- Children: 2, S. Nandagopal (son)
- Relatives: Bhaskar Menon (son-in-law)

Kolozhi Cheerambathur Sankara Paniker (31 May 1911 – 16 January 1977) was an Indian metaphysical and abstract painter from Malabar District. He interpreted the country's age-old metaphysical and spiritual knowledge in the 1960s, when Indian art was under the influence of the Western painters. "That was the time when a few Indian artists were trying to break out of this Western influence and establish an idiom and identity of their own", he said.

In 1976, he was awarded the highest award of the Lalit Kala Akademi, India's National Academy of Art, the Fellow of the Lalit Kala Akademi for lifetime contribution.

== Early life and education ==
Born in Malabar on 31 May 1911, Paniker received his education in present-day Kerala and later in Tamil Nadu. The lush green village where Paniker lived influenced the colourful landscapes of his early years. The bright colours stayed in his paintings, even though he moved away from landscapes and onto other subject matters.

A virtual child prodigy, Paniker began painting landscapes when he was 12. By the age of 17, he was exhibiting at the Madras Fine Arts Society's annual shows. In 1928, he gave up college education to take up a job at the Indian Telegraph Department to support his family after the death of his father.

At the age of 25, he joined the Government School of Arts and Crafts, Chennai (1936–40). And also studied in Madras Christian College.

== Career ==
Since 1941, Paniker has been holding one man shows in Chennai and Delhi. He founded the Progressive Painters’ Association (P.P.A), in Chennai in 1944. In 1954 he got his first international exposure when he held exhibitions at London and Paris. He became the principal of the Government College of Fine Arts, Chennai, in 1957, and in 1966 formed the Cholamandal Artists' Village, 9 km from Chennai, with his students and a few fellow artists.

The exhibitions abroad and his exposure to abstract artists like Salvador Dalí had a major influence on his art.

The colours he used were bright and sunny, as are colors in the paintings of the Impressionists. Somewhere down the line, Paniker moved on to use calligraphy and symbols to project a state of metaphysical abstraction.

KCS Paniker died in Madras at the age 65 on 16 January 1977.

== Legacy ==
KCS Paniker is considered as a leading figure in the Madras Art Movement. He is the founder of Cholamandal Artists' Village.
