= Injambakkam =

- neighbourhood
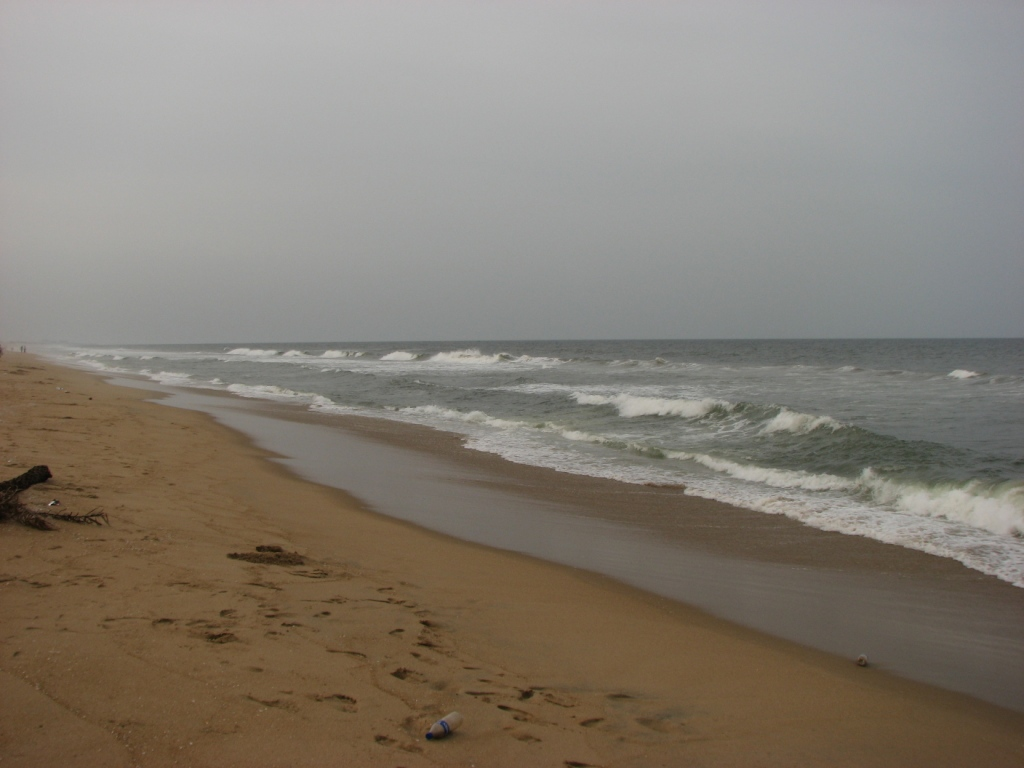
- Coastline at Injambakkam

- Location within Chennai Location within Tamil Nadu Location within India
- Coordinates: 12.9162°N 80.2488°E
- Country: India
- State: Tamil Nadu
- Taluka: Sholinganallur
- Metro: Chennai

Population (2011)
  - Total: 23,346

Languages
  - Official: Tamil
- Time zone: UTC+5:30 (IST)
- Postal code: 600115
- Vehicle registration: TN 14

Injambakkam is a locality in the south of Chennai in the Indian state of Tamil Nadu. Being a part of the Walajabad block of the district, its panchayat is part of Walajabad panchayat union. Injambakkam is located along the ECR.

== Demographics ==
In the 2001 India census, Injambakkam had a population of 10,084. Males constituted 52% of the population and females 48%. Injambakkam had an average literacy rate of 73%, higher than the national average of 59.5%: male literacy was 78%, and female literacy was 68%. In 2001 in Injambakkam, 15% of the population was under 6 years of age.

In the 2011 census, Injambakkam had a population of 23,346.
