= Deaths in January 2008 =

The following is a list of notable deaths in January 2008.

Entries for each day are listed alphabetically by surname. A typical entry lists information in the following sequence:

- Name, age, country of citizenship at birth, subsequent country of citizenship (if applicable), reason for notability, cause of death (if known), and reference.

== January 2008 ==
=== 1 ===
- Salvatore Bonanno, 75, American mobster, heart attack.
- Peter Caffrey, 58, Irish actor (Ballykissangel, Coronation Street, Glenroe), complications from stroke.
- Pratap Chandra Chunder, 89, Indian Cabinet Minister (1977–1980), heart disease.
- Harold Corsini, 88, American photographer, stroke.
- Chuck Daniel, 74, American baseball player.
- Harald Deilmann, 87, German architect and author.
- Len Dockett, 87, Australian footballer.
- Irena Górska-Damięcka, 97, Polish actress.
- John Granville, 33, American diplomat, homicide.
- Philip Hogarty, 19, Irish Chess Union president, traffic collision.
- Erich Kästner, 107, German jurist and last known World War I veteran.
- T. Maheswaran, 41, Sri Lankan politician, Cabinet Minister, assassination by gunshot.
- Lucas Sang, 46, Kenyan runner and 1988 Olympian, homicide.
- Wanda Sieradzka de Ruig, 84, Polish author, poet, journalist and translator.
- Oleg Tolmachev, 88, Russian ice hockey player and coach.

=== 2 ===
- Henri Andrieux, 76, French Olympic cyclist.
- Joyce Carlson, 84, American artist, designer of Disney's It's a Small World rides, cancer.
- Lee S. Dreyfus, 81, American politician, Governor of Wisconsin (1979–1983).
- George MacDonald Fraser, 82, British novelist (Harry Paget Flashman) and screenwriter (Octopussy, The Three Musketeers), cancer.
- Brice Mack, 90, American animator (Cinderella, Peter Pan, Fantasia).
- Julio Martínez, 84, Chilean sports journalist, cancer.
- Keith McCance, 78, Australian politician, member of the Victorian Legislative Assembly (1979–1989).
- G. G. Njuguna Ngengi, Kenyan politician, homicide.
- Robert C. Schnitzer, 101, American actor, producer and educator.
- Günter Schubert, 69, German actor.
- Gerry Staley, 87, American baseball pitcher (Chicago White Sox), natural causes.
- Galyani Vadhana, 84, Thai princess, eldest sister of King Bhumibol Adulyadej, cancer.
- Edward F. Welch Jr., 83, American admiral, heart failure.

=== 3 ===
- Aleksandr Abdulov, 54, Russian actor, lung cancer.
- Jack Aranson, 83, British actor, pneumonia.
- Edelmiro Arévalo, 78, Paraguayan football player.
- Choi Yo-sam, 34, South Korean boxer, WBC Light Flyweight Champion, cerebral hemorrhage.
- Henri Chopin, 85, French poet and artist.
- Natasha Collins, 31, British television presenter.
- Werner Dollinger, 89, German politician.
- Petru Dugulescu, 62, Romanian Baptist pastor, poet and politician, heart attack.
- Milt Dunnell, 102, Canadian sportswriter.
- Butch Felker, 62, American mayor of Topeka, Kansas, cancer.
- Gilbert A Harrison, 92, American magazine editor.
- Joseph Lazarow, 84, American mayor of Atlantic City, New Jersey.
- Herman Le Compte, 78, Belgian doctor, the 'Vitamin Doctor', heart attack.
- António Matias, 44, Portuguese judoka.
- Andrew J. Olmsted, 37, American army blogger in Iraq, shot.
- Lisandro Otero, 75, Cuban author.
- Nikolay Puzanov, 69, Russian Soviet biathlete, 1968 Olympic Gold medalist.
- Manolo Reyes, 83, American pioneering Spanish-language newscaster, Parkinson's disease.
- Jimmy Stewart, 76, British racing driver.
- O.G. Style, 37, American rapper, brain aneurysm.

=== 4 ===
- Vyacheslav Ambartsumyan, 67, Russian footballer, hit by car.
- Bjørn Odmar Andersen, 64, Norwegian footballer.
- Sir Bernard Audley, 83, British businessman and philanthropist.
- Keith Baxter, 36, British drummer of rock band 3 Colours Red, liver failure.
- Xavier Chamorro Cardenal, 75, Nicaraguan editor of El Nuevo Diario, heart failure.
- Stig Claesson, 79, Swedish writer.
- Vernon Derrick, 74, American musician.
- Emilio Benavent Escuín, 93, Spanish Bishop of Granada.
- Mort Garson, 83, Canadian electronic musician, renal failure.
- Herbert Keppler, 82, American photojournalist.
- Marianne Kiefer, 79, German actress.
- Jimmy Nah, 40, Singaporean actor and comedian.
- John O'Donohue, 52, Irish poet, philosopher and priest.
- Graham Percy, 69, British illustrator of children's books.
- Jens Quistgaard, 88, Danish industrial designer for Dansk International Designs.
- Bill Ramsey, 87, American baseball player.
- Henry Savory, 93, British cricketer.
- Bert Walker, 88, New Zealand politician, Cabinet Minister.
- Claude Whatham, 80, British film and television director.

=== 5 ===
- Luis E. Aguilar Leon, 81, Cuban journalist, professor and historian.
- Tony Ambrose, 74, British rally driver.
- John Ashley, 77, Canadian referee in the National Hockey League, heart failure.
- Rowan Ayers, 85, British television producer.
- Michel Conte, 75, French born, naturalized Canadian choreographer, lyricist and composer of film music and television music.
- Giovanni Rinaldo Coronas, 89, Italian politician, police chief and Interior Minister.
- Phillip S. Figa, 56, American federal judge, brain tumor.
- Raymond Forni, 66, French politician, National Assembly president, leukemia.
- Thomas Cecil Gray, 94, British pioneer in anaesthetics.
- Clinton Grybas, 32, Australian sports commentator.
- Louis Hon, 83, French footballer.
- Edward Kłosiński, 65, Polish cinematographer.
- Ronald Lee Moore, 40, American fugitive and suspected serial killer, suicide by hanging.
- Luiz Pacheco, 82, Portuguese writer.
- Irene Reid, 77, American jazz singer, cardiac arrest
- İhsan Saraçlar, 79, Turkish jurist and politician.

=== 6 ===
- Shmuel Berenbaum, 87, American Orthodox rabbi and rosh yeshiva, stomach cancer.
- Jack Brod, 98, American last original tenant of the Empire State Building.
- Arafan Camara, 60, Guinean politician.
- Bob LeMond, 94, American radio and television announcer (Leave It to Beaver).
- Cy Leslie, 85, American founder of Pickwick Records and MGM/UA Home Entertainment Group.
- Alekos Michaelides, 74, Cypriot politician, Foreign Minister.
- Yunus Mohamed, 57, South African lawyer and anti-Apartheid activist.
- Ken Nelson, 96, American record producer and member of the Country Music Hall of Fame.
- Anders Paulrud, 56, Swedish writer and journalist, lung cancer.
- Regal Discovery, 15, Canadian Thoroughbred racehorse.
- Pramod Karan Sethi, 80, Indian orthopaedic surgeon, inventor of the Jaipur foot, cardiac arrest.
- Charlie Steele Jr., 77, New Zealand football player.
- Vittorio Tomassetti, 77, Italian Bishop of Fano-Fossombrone-Cagli-Pergola.

=== 7 ===
- Philip Agee, 72, American CIA agent, complications from perforated ulcer surgery.
- Raffaello de Banfield, 85, British composer.
- Robert Chandran, 57, Singaporean CEO of Chemoil, helicopter crash.
- Rex D. Davis, 83, American law enforcement official, director of the ATF (1970–1978), colon infection.
- Maryvonne Dupureur, 70, French runner and 1964 Olympic medalist.
- Houston Flournoy, 78, American member of California State Assembly (1961–1967), California State Controller (1967–1975).
- Detlef Kraus, 88, German pianist.
- Andrey Kurennoy, 35, Russian track and field athlete, national triple jump champion.
- Buddy LeRoux, 77, American owner of the Boston Red Sox, natural causes.
- Boris Lurie, 83, American artist and writer.
- Vincent Meli, 87, American member of the Detroit Partnership, bone cancer.
- Bozo Miller, 89, American competitive eater, natural causes.
- Hans Monderman, 62, Dutch traffic engineer, cancer.
- Marcel Mouly, 88, French painter.
- Njoo Kiem Bie, 81, Indonesian badminton player.
- Palace Music, 26, American Thoroughbred racehorse, euthanized.
- Alwyn Schlebusch, 90, South African politician, Vice State President (1981–1984).
- Jean-Claude Vrinat, 71, French owner of Taillevent restaurant, lung cancer.
- Wei Wenhua, 41, Chinese blogger, beaten.

=== 8 ===
- D. M. Dassanayake, 54, Sri Lankan Minister of Nation Building, roadside bomb.
- Jim Dooley, 77, American football player and coach (Chicago Bears), amyotrophic lateral sclerosis.
- Guy Hance, 74, Belgian politician.
- Bjarni Jónsson, 73, Icelandic painter.
- Moshe Levi, 71, Israeli Chief of Staff of the Defense Forces (1983–1987), stroke.
- George Moore, 84, Australian jockey and trainer.
- Clyde Otis, 83, American songwriter and record producer.
- Irvan Perez, 85, American Isleño décima singer and woodcarver, heart attack.
- Steve Ridzik, 78, American baseball player (Philadelphia Phillies), heart disease.
- Mohammad Sadli, 85, Indonesian politician.
- Shaadi, 21, American-bred, British-trained Thoroughbred racehorse and sire.
- Cissie Stewart, 96, British Olympic swimmer.
- Xu Genjun, 72, Chinese biochemist, member of the Chinese Academy of Sciences.

=== 9 ===
- Paul Aimson, 64, English footballer (Manchester City, York City), heart attack.
- Jorge Anaya, 81, Argentinian admiral, heart failure.
- Bobby Beasley, 72, Irish jockey and racehorse trainer.
- Sir Adam Butler, 76, British MP (1970–1987) and minister.
- Václav Čevona, 85, Czech Olympic athlete.
- Sophie Elliott, 22, New Zealand murder victim.
- Carmine Furletti, 81, Brazilian industrialist, president of Cruzeiro.
- Gemina, 21, American-born African Baringo giraffe at the Santa Barbara Zoo with neck deformity, euthanized.
- Mehran Ghassemi, 30, Iranian journalist, heart failure.
- Johnny Grant, 84, American entertainer, honorary Mayor of Hollywood.
- Sir John Harvey-Jones, 83, British businessman and media personality.
- Walter J. Kavanaugh, 74, American politician, complications from diabetes.
- Roi Kwabena, 51, Trinidadian cultural anthropologist, lung cancer.
- Sara Misquez, 62, American president of the Mescalero Apache of New Mexico (1999–2003), traffic collision.
- Peter O'Donnell, 68, Australian gold medal-winning Olympic sailor (1964), cancer.
- Erna Sondheim, 103, German fencer.
- Lew Spence, 87, American songwriter.
- Sir John Willis, 70, British Air Chief Marshal.
- Tim Willoughby, 53, Australian 1984 Olympic rowing medallist, heart attack.

=== 10 ===
- Pandiyan, 48, Tamil actor and politician, liver failure due to jaundice.
- Christopher Bowman, 40, American Olympic figure skater, accidental drug overdose.
- Jack Eagle, 81, American comedian and actor (Stepmom, Isn't She Great).
- Ray M. Flavin, 95, American politician.
- Abdelaziz Gorgi, 79, Tunisian painter.
- Andrés Henestrosa, 101, Mexican writer and politician, proponent of the Zapotec language.
- George Laking, 95, New Zealand diplomat and public servant.
- Andrée Marlière, 73, Belgian prima ballerina, choreographer and painter, cancer.
- Allan McEachern, 81, Canadian jurist, Chief Justice of the Supreme Court of British Columbia.
- Mikhail Minin, 85, Russian soldier who raised the Soviet flag on the Reichstag building in 1945.
- Sir Geoffrey Musson, 97, British army general.
- Katsutoshi Nagasawa, 84, Japanese composer.
- Maila Nurmi, 85, Finnish actress (Plan 9 from Outer Space, The Beat Generation).
- Zhang Lichang, 68, Chinese politician, Politbureau member.

=== 11 ===
- Mohammad Alam, 61, Bangladeshi photo journalist.
- José Bello, 103, Spanish intellectual and writer.
- Pete Candoli, 84, American big band-era jazz trumpeter, prostate cancer.
- Murray Cohl, 78, Canadian film producer, co-founder of the Toronto Film Festival and Canada's Walk of Fame, liver cancer.
- Sir Edmund Hillary, 88, New Zealand mountaineer and the first person (with Tenzing Norgay) to reach summit of Mount Everest, heart failure.
- Carl Karcher, 90, American founder of Carl's Jr. restaurants, complications from Parkinson's disease.
- Frank Loughran, 77, Australian international footballer.
- Nancy Phelan, 94, Australian writer.

=== 12 ===
- Charlie Aitken, 75, Scottish footballer.
- Gennady Bachinsky, 36, Russian television and radio personality, traffic collision.
- Isobel Bennett, 98, Australian marine scientist.
- Gwendolyn T. Britt, 66, American Maryland State Senator since 2003.
- Sir Howard Dalton, 63, British microbiologist, Chief Scientific Adviser at DEFRA.
- Adriano González León, 76, Venezuelan writer.
- Ángel González Muñiz, 82, Spanish poet.
- Marty Hendin, 59, American vice president of community relations for St. Louis Cardinals, cancer.
- Leszek Jezierski, 79, Polish footballer and trainer.
- Anatoly Kyarov, 50, Russian head of the Kabardino-Balkaria police, shot.
- Jennifer Musa, 90, Irish-born Pakistani politician.
- Louis Alexandre Raimon, 85, French hairdresser.
- Stanisław Wycech, 105, Polish last World War I veteran.

=== 13 ===
- Joe Burk, 93, American rowing champion, complications of surgery.
- John Harvey, 87, British politician, MP for Walthamstow East (1955–1966).
- Sergej Larin, 51, Lithuanian tenor.
- Johnny Podres, 75, American baseball pitcher (Brooklyn Dodgers), 1955 World Series MVP.
- Jafar Shahidi, 89, Iranian linguist and historian.
- Doreen Tovey, 89, British writer.
- Patricia Verdugo, 61, Chilean writer, journalist and human rights violations investigator, cancer.
- Walter Zimper, 65, Austrian politician.
- Shahat Muhammad Anwar, 57, Egyptian Quran reciter.

=== 14 ===
- Józef Bartosik, 90, Polish World War II veteran and rear admiral.
- Don Cardwell, 72, American baseball pitcher.
- Kaj Christiansen, 86, Danish association football player.
- Selim Al Deen, 58, Bangladeshi dramatist, cardiac arrest.
- Judah Folkman, 74, American cancer researcher, apparent heart attack.
- Thor Hesla, 45, American USAid worker in the 2008 Kabul Serena Hotel attack.
- Richard Knerr, 82, American co-founder of Wham-O, inventor of the frisbee and Hula Hoop, stroke.
- Vincenz Liechtenstein, 57, Austrian politician.
- Tommy Limby, 60, Swedish cross-country skier.
- Joseph Payne, 70, British musician.
- Johnny Steele, 91, British football manager of Barnsley (1960–1971, 1972–1973).
- Carsten Thomassen, 38, Norwegian journalist, 2008 Kabul Serena Hotel attack.
- Milton Wolff, 92, American Spanish Civil War veteran.
- Wu Jin, 74, Taiwanese Minister for Education (1996–1998), cancer.

=== 15 ===
- K. M. Adimoolam, 69, Indian abstract artist.
- Rupe Andrews, 81, Canadian football player.
- Roger Anger, 84, French architect.
- Arthur I. Appleton, 92, American businessman.
- Mark Haigh-Hutchinson, 43, British video game developer (Paperboy, Zombies Ate My Neighbors), pancreatic cancer.
- Eduardo Hontiveros, 84, Filipino Jesuit composer of Roman Catholic liturgical songs, stroke.
- John D. Lawson, 84, British scientist.
- Adele Longmire, 89, American actress.
- Jason MacIntyre, 34, British road bicycle racer, traffic collision.
- Ronald Noll, 78, American conductor, complications from diabetes and heart disease.
- Brad Renfro, 25, American actor (The Client, Ghost World, Apt Pupil), accidental heroin overdose.
- Anthony M. Solomon, 88, American President of Federal Reserve Bank of New York (1980–1985), kidney failure.

=== 16 ===
- Jorge Bagration of Mukhrani, 63, Spanish race car driver, claimant to throne of the Royal House of Georgia, hepatitis.
- Mathias Chen Xilu, 79, Chinese Roman Catholic Bishop of Hengshui, organ failure.
- Nikola Kljusev, 80, Macedonian politician and economist, Prime Minister of Macedonia (1991–1992).
- Pierre Lambert, 87, French Trotskyist leader and 1988 presidential candidate.
- Munjuku Nguvauva II, 85, Namibian traditional tribal chief, complications from strokes.
- Gerry Tordoff, 78, English cricketer (Somerset).
- Hone Tuwhare, 85, New Zealand Māori poet.
- Bungo Yoshida, 73, Japanese Bunraku puppeteer, liver cancer.
- Elias Zoghby, 96, Egyptian Melkite Greek Catholic Archbishop of Baalbek.

=== 17 ===
- Manfred Abelein, 77, German politician.
- Mofida Ahmed, 88, Indian politician.
- Carlos, 64, French singer, cancer.
- Joseph M. Champlin, 77, American Roman Catholic priest, bone marrow, cancer.
- Trevor Drayton, 52, Australian winemaker, explosion.
- Tony Dean, 75, British racing driver.
- Bobby Fischer, 64, American chess grandmaster, world champion (1972–1975), kidney failure.
- Edward D. Hoch, 77, American writer of detective fiction, heart attack.
- Ernie Holmes, 59, American football player (Pittsburgh Steelers), traffic collision.
- Mildred Callahan Jones, 64, American decorative flag pioneer.
- Denise Amber Lee, 21, American kidnap victim, shot.
- Carole Lynne, 89, British actress, wife of Bernard Delfont.
- John McHale, 86, American baseball player.
- Allan Melvin, 84, American actor (The Phil Silvers Show, The Brady Bunch, All in the Family), cancer.
- Madeleine Milhaud, 105, French actress, wife of Darius Milhaud.
- Giuliana Penzi, 90, Italian dancer and choreographer.
- Della Purves, 62, British botanical artist, liver disease.
- William E. Schaufele Jr., 84, American diplomat, U. S. Ambassador to Upper Volta (1969–1971), U. S. Ambassador to Poland (1978–1980).
- Trevor Sprigg, 61, Australian politician, Western Australian Legislative Assembly whip, heart attack.
- Jinzō Toriumi, 78, Japanese novelist and screenwriter (Speed Racer, Gatchaman, Armored Trooper Votoms), liver cancer.
- Eddy Williams, 92, Australian cricketer.

=== 18 ===
- Uzi Cohen, 55, Israeli Likud politician, heart attack.
- Pier Miranda Ferraro, 83, Italian opera tenor, cardiac arrest.
- Wally Fielding, 88, British footballer (Everton).
- Georgia Frontiere, 80, American majority-owner of Los Angeles/St. Louis Rams, breast cancer.
- Ruth Hamilton, 109, American talk show host, member of New Hampshire General Court (1964–1966, 1973–1975).
- Bertram James, 92, British World War II airman, participant in The Great Escape.
- Frank Lewin, 82, American composer, heart failure.
- Sir Frederick Mason, 94, British diplomat, Ambassador to Chile.
- Lois Nettleton, 80, American actress (A Face in the Crowd, All That Glitters, In the Heat of the Night), lung cancer.
- Paul Nixon, 93, American Olympic cyclist.
- Ugo Pirro, 87, Italian screenwriter.
- John Stroger, 78, American politician, President of the Cook County, Illinois Board, stroke.

=== 19 ===
- Sir Derek Alun-Jones, 74, British businessman.
- Valentim Amões, 48, Angolan politician and businessman, plane crash.
- Creighton Burns, 82, Australian editor (The Age, 1981–1989), cancer.
- Victor S. Johnson Jr., 91, American lawyer, president of Aladdin Industries, colon cancer.
- Frances Lewine, 86, American journalist and White House Correspondent, stroke.
- Morris Maddocks, 79, British Bishop of Selby (1972–1983).
- Mildred Noble, 86, American writer and Native American activist, complications from liver cancer.
- Andy Palacio, 47, Belizean musician, UNESCO Artist for Peace and Garifuna activist, heart attack followed by stroke.
- Lou Palmer, 75, American radio personality and announcer, brain hemorrhage.
- Suzanne Pleshette, 70, American actress (The Bob Newhart Show, The Birds, Spirited Away), respiratory failure.
- Eugene Sawyer, 73, American politician, Mayor of Chicago (1987–1989), strokes.
- John Stewart, 68, American musician (The Kingston Trio), stroke.
- Trevor Taylor, 50, Jamaican-born German singer (Bad Boys Blue), heart attack.
- H. Bradford Westerfield, 79, American political scientist, complications of Parkinson's disease.
- Don Wittman, 71, Canadian sports broadcaster for CBC, cancer.

=== 20 ===
- Clark Allen, 82, American entertainer, artist, and businessman, respiratory failure.
- Louis de Cazenave, 110, French supercentenarian, second-to-last official surviving French World War I veteran, natural causes.
- Brianna Denison, 19, American college student.
- Ken Gee, 92, Australian judge.
- Harry Gill, 85, British Royal Air Force officer.
- Tālivaldis Ķeniņš, 88, Canadian composer.
- Margit Kristian, 94, Yugoslavian Olympic fencer.
- Abdul Latif, 56, British restaurateur, heart attack.
- Duilio Loi, 78, Italian boxer, Alzheimer's disease.
- Tommy McQuater, 93, British jazz trumpeter.
- Donald Odanga, Kenyan basketball player, accidental shooting.
- Ghorban Soleimani, 87, Iranian vocalist and dotar player.
- James LeVoy Sorenson, 86, American medical device inventor and billionaire philanthropist, cancer.
- Georges Wahler, 74, French Olympic shooter.
- Eudoxia Woodward, 88, American painter, cancer.

=== 21 ===
- Rooster Andrews, 84, American football player.
- Pam Barrett, 54, Canadian politician, cancer.
- Billy Elliott, 82, British footballer (Sunderland).
- Evan G. Galbraith, 79, American diplomat, Ambassador to France (1981–1985), cancer.
- Burton Hatlen, 71, American literary scholar, founder of National Poetry Foundation, mentor to Stephen King, pneumonia.
- Peggy Jay, 95, British politician.
- Wesley Ngetich Kimutai, 30, Kenyan marathon runner, homicide by poison arrow.
- Kenneth Parnell, 76, American convicted child molester and kidnapper, natural causes.
- Jiří Sequens, 85, Czech film director.
- Marie Smith Jones, 89, American last known native speaker of the Eyak language, natural causes.
- Luiz Carlos Tourinho, 43, Brazilian actor, cerebral aneurysm.

=== 22 ===
- Orhan Aksoy, 78, Turkish director and screenwriter.
- Bernie Boston, 74, American photographer ("flower power" movement), blood disease.
- Dora Bria, 49, Brazilian windsurfing champion, traffic collision.
- Mike Cacic, 71, Canadian football player (BC Lions).
- Diane Chenery-Wickens, 48, British television make-up artist, murder (last seen alive on this date).
- Lance Clemons, 60, American baseball relief pitcher, cancer.
- Roberto Gari, 88, American actor and artist, heart attack.
- Helge Hansen, 82, Danish Olympic cyclist.
- Heath Ledger, 28, Australian actor (The Dark Knight, Brokeback Mountain, 10 Things I Hate About You), Oscar winner (2009), accidental drug overdose.
- Miles Lerman, 88, American founder of the United States Holocaust Memorial Museum.
- Ștefan Niculescu, 80, Romanian composer.
- Claude Piron, 76, Swiss linguist and Esperanto author.
- Kevin Stoney, 87, British actor (Doctor Who), skin cancer.

=== 23 ===
- Andrzej Andrzejewski, 46, Polish Brigadier General of the Polish Air Force, plane crash.
- David Askevold, 67, Canadian artist.
- Felix Carlebach, 96, British rabbi.
- Steve Duplantis, 35, American pro golf caddy, traffic collision.
- Leticia de Oyuela, 74, Honduran historian.
- Stein Rønning, 42, Norwegian karate world champion (1990).

=== 24 ===
- Lee Embree, 92, American photographer, took first air-to-air photographs of 1941 attack on Pearl Harbor, kidney infection.
- Art Frantz, 86, American baseball umpire, heart failure.
- Johannes Heggland, 88, Norwegian author and politician.
- Dorothy Hennessey, 94, American nun and activist.
- J. Robert Hooper, 71, American politician, Maryland State Senator (1999–2007), colon cancer.
- Megat Junid, 65, Malaysian MP, Minister of Domestic Trade and Consumer Affairs (1997–1999) prostate cancer.
- Randy Salerno, 45, American news reporter (CBS, WBBM-TV), snowmobile accident.
- Jahna Steele, 49, American transgender showgirl.

=== 25 ===
- Christopher Allport, 60, American actor (To Live and Die in L.A., Another World, Felicity), avalanche.
- Evelyn Barbirolli, 97, British oboist, wife of Sir John Barbirolli.
- Annette Cameron, 88, Australian political activist.
- Richard Darman, 64, American Director of the Office of Management and Budget (1989–1993), leukemia.
- Ralph Dupas, 72, American boxer, complications of boxing-induced brain damage.
- Louisa Horton, 87, American actress (All My Sons, Swashbuckler, Alice, Sweet Alice).
- Andreas Hönisch, 77, Polish Superior General of Servi Jesu et Mariae, founder of the Catholic Scouts of Europe.
- Roc Kirby, 89, Australian founder of Village Roadshow Limited.
- Robert Miller, 24, American soldier, posthumous Medal of Honor recipient, killed in action.
- Cândido Rubens Padín, 92, Brazilian Bishop of Bauru.
- Aziz Sedky, 87, Egyptian Prime Minister (1972–1973).
- P. K. Thomas, 81, Welsh neurologist.
- Gary Wiggins, 55, Australian cyclist.

=== 26 ===
- John Ardagh, 79, British journalist and author.
- Christian Brando, 49, American actor and convicted killer, son of Marlon Brando, pneumonia.
- Abraham Brumberg, 81, American writer and editor, heart failure.
- Raymond Daniels, 28, Irish footballer (Wicklow GAA), suspected heart attack.
- Igor Dmitriev, 80, Russian actor.
- George Habash, 81, Palestinian founder of the Popular Front for the Liberation of Palestine, heart attack.
- Bryan Jennett, 81, British neurosurgeon.
- Arthur Kramer, 81, American lawyer, founder of Kramer Levin, stroke.
- Padraic McGuinness, 69, Australian journalist and editor, cancer.
- Viktor Schreckengost, 101, American artist and industrial designer.
- Robert Weaver, 87, Canadian editor and broadcaster.
- Lovie Yancey, 96, American businessman, founder of Fatburger, pneumonia.
- Zhang Hanzhi, 72, Chinese diplomat and linguist, English tutor for Mao, Nixon interpreter for 1972 visit, lung-related illness.

=== 27 ===
- Botho Prinz zu Sayn-Wittgenstein-Hohenstein, 80, German politician, president of German Red Cross (1982–1994).
- Gordon B. Hinckley, 97, American President of the Church of Jesus Christ of Latter-day Saints.
- Mike Holovak, 88, American football player and coach (Boston Patriots), pneumonia.
- Ken Hunt, 69, American baseball player (Cincinnati Reds).
- John W. Ingram, 79, American railroad executive (Chicago, Rock Island and Pacific Railroad).
- Anna Loginova, 29, Russian bodyguard for boxer Kostya Tszyu, head injury during carjacking.
- Gerry McIntyre, 78, Irish Olympic athlete.
- Alan G. Rogers, 40, American Army major, first known gay combat fatality of Iraq War, improvised explosive device.
- Valery Shumakov, 76, Russian transplantologist, founder of the Transplant and Artificial Organs Research Institute.
- Irene Stegun, 88, American mathematician.
- Suharto, 86, Indonesian President (1967–1998), multiple organ dysfunction syndrome.
- Louie Welch, 89, American mayor of Houston, Texas (1964–1973), lung cancer.

=== 28 ===
- Crisologo Abines, 64, Filipino politician, heart attack.
- Les Anning, 94, Canadian ice hockey player.
- Christodoulos of Athens, 69, Greek primate of the Church of Greece, colon and liver cancer.
- Frances Dewey Wormser, 104, American vaudeville and Broadway theater actress.
- Dagfinn Grønoset, 87, Norwegian author.
- John Gunnell, 74, British politician, MP (1992–2001).
- Tapio Hämäläinen, 85, Finnish actor and theater counsellor.
- Gerry Patrick Hemming, 70, American anti-Castro mercenary.
- Bengt Lindström, 82, Swedish painter.
- Larry Smith, 68, American college football coach, chronic lymphocytic leukemia.
- Marie Takvam, 81, Norwegian author and actor.
- Ginty Vrede, 22, Dutch Muay Thai martial artist, heart attack.

=== 29 ===
- Kastuś Akuła, 82, Belarusian writer.
- Robert M. Ball, 93, American Commissioner of Social Security (1962–1973).
- Margaret Truman, 83, American author, daughter of President Harry S. Truman.
- Rubens Gerchman, 66, Brazilian painter, lung cancer.
- Roberta Gale, 93, American actress.
- Helga Goetze, 85, German artist and writer, stroke.
- James Heathman, 90, American who found the 1931 TWA plane crash that killed Knute Rockne, pneumonia.
- Raymond Jacobs, 82, American soldier, claimed to be in photo of first flag raised on Iwo Jima.
- Philippe Khorsand, 59, French actor.
- Sebastian Kräuter, 85, Romanian author and Bishop of Timişoara.
- Abu Laith al-Libi, 41, Libyan-born Afghan al-Qaeda leader, missile strike.
- Erzsébet Nagy, 80, Hungarian writer, daughter of Prime Minister Imre Nagy.
- Manuel Padilla Jr., 52, American actor (American Graffiti, Tarzan, The Flying Nun), colon cancer.
- Mugabe Were, 39, Kenyan legislator, homicide by gunshot.

=== 30 ===
- Jeremy Beadle, 59, British television presenter (You've Been Framed, Beadle's About), pneumonia.
- Claude Faraldo, 71, French actor, screenwriter and film director.
- Daniel Gráč, 64, Czech Olympic cyclist.
- Herbert Kenwith, 90, American television director, complications of prostate cancer.
- Miles Kington, 66, British newspaper columnist and humorist.
- Marcial Maciel, 87, Mexican religious leader, founder of the Legionaries of Christ.
- Roland Selmeczi, 38, Hungarian actor, traffic collision.
- Wilber Varela, 50, Colombian drug trafficker, shot.

=== 31 ===
- Arif Ali, 46, Pakistani-born British regional director for the Associated Press, cancer.
- Sanan Alizade, 64, Azerbaijani politician, heart attack.
- Veronika Bayer, 67, German actress.
- František Čapek, 93, Czech canoeist, Olympic C1 10,000m gold medallist in 1948, heart ailment.
- Joe Clark, 87, English footballer.
- Sir Ivar Colquhoun, 8th Baronet, 92, British aristocrat.
- Sir Donald Hawley, 86, British diplomat, High Commissioner to Malaysia (1977–1981).
- Jim Lacey, 73, Australian administrator of Lord Howe Island, general manager of Western Plains Zoo.
- Zeltim Odie Peterson, 10, American purebred pedigreed pug, heart attack.
- Mark Schwed, 52, American television critic and journalist.
- Bertie Smalls, 72, British criminal turned informant.
- David Kimutai Too, 39, Kenyan legislator, shot.
- Volodia Teitelboim, 91, Chilean politician.
