= Charles Hoffman =

Charles Hoffman may refer to:

- Charles Hoffman (screenwriter) (1911–1972), film and TV writer
- Charles Hoffman (politician) (born 1960), Republican member of the South Dakota House of Representatives
- Charles E. Hoffman (born 1949), chief executive
- Charles F. Hoffman (1878–1930), the pseudonym used by Ernest A. Janson, double Medal of Honor recipient during WWI
- Charles F. Hoffmann (1838–1913), German-American topographer with the Whitney Survey Party in California.
- Charles S. Hoffman, geneticist and co-developer of the Smash and Grab biology technique with Fred Winston
- Charles W. Hoffman (1829 - 1896), founding dean of Georgetown University Law Center and Law Librarian of Congress
- Charles Fenno Hoffman (1806–1884), American poet
- Charley Hoffman (born 1976), American golfer
- Charlie Hoffman (born 1956), Democratic member of the Kentucky House of Representatives
- Charles Hofmann (1763–1823), Dutch musician and composer
