= Valentim =

Valentim is both a Portuguese surname and a given name. Notable people with the name include:

== Surname ==
- Evangelino Valentim (born 1984), Nigerian footballer
- Valentim (footballer) (born 1977), full name Francisco de Assis Clarentino Valentim, Brazilian footballer
- Othon Valentim Filho (born 1944), Brazilian footballer
- Paulo Valentim (1933–1984), Brazilian footballer
- Paulo Valentim (guitarist), Portuguese guitarist
- Rubem Valentim (1922–1991), Brazilian artist

== Given name ==
- Valentim Amões (1960–2008), Angolan politician
- Valentim Fernandes, Portuguese printer
- Valentim Loureiro (born 1938), Portuguese politician
- Valentim Magalhães (1859-1903), Brazilian journalist and novelist

== See also ==
- Valentim Gentil, a municipality in São Paulo, Brazil
- São Valentim, a municipality in Rio Grande do Sul, Brazil
- Valentim de Carvalho, a Portuguese record label
