= Hance =

Hance is an English and French surname. Notable people with the surname include:

- Benjamin Hance (born 2000), Australian Paralympic swimmer
- Blake Hance (born 1996), American football player
- Guy Hance (1933–2008), Belgian politician
- Henry Fletcher Hance (1827–1886), British diplomat and botanist whose standard author abbreviation is Hance
- Kent Hance (born 1942), American academic administrator
- Rei Hance (born 1974 as Heather Donahue), American actress and writer
- William Henry Hance (1951–1994), American soldier and serial killer
