= General Fick =

General Fick may refer to:

- Eric Fick (fl. 1900s–2020s), U.S. Air Force lieutenant general
- Ernst Otto Fick (1898–1945), German Waffen-SS major general
- Kathleen E. Fick (fl. 1970s–2010s), U.S. Air Force major general
