= Carsten Thomassen =

Carsten Thomassen may refer to:

- Carsten Thomassen (mathematician)
- Carsten Thomassen (journalist)
