= Smash and grab (disambiguation) =

Smash and grab may refer to:

- Smash and grab, the crime
- Smash and Grab (1937 film), a British film
- Smash & Grab, the 2013 documentary
- Smash and Grab (2019 film), a Pixar short film
- Smash and Grab (Racey album), a 1979 album by Racey
- Smash and Grab Part 1, 2, 3, and 4; four tracks on The Offspring's Americana
- Smash and Grab (biology), a technique used in molecular biology
