= Robert Rocco Cottone =

American academic (born 1952)

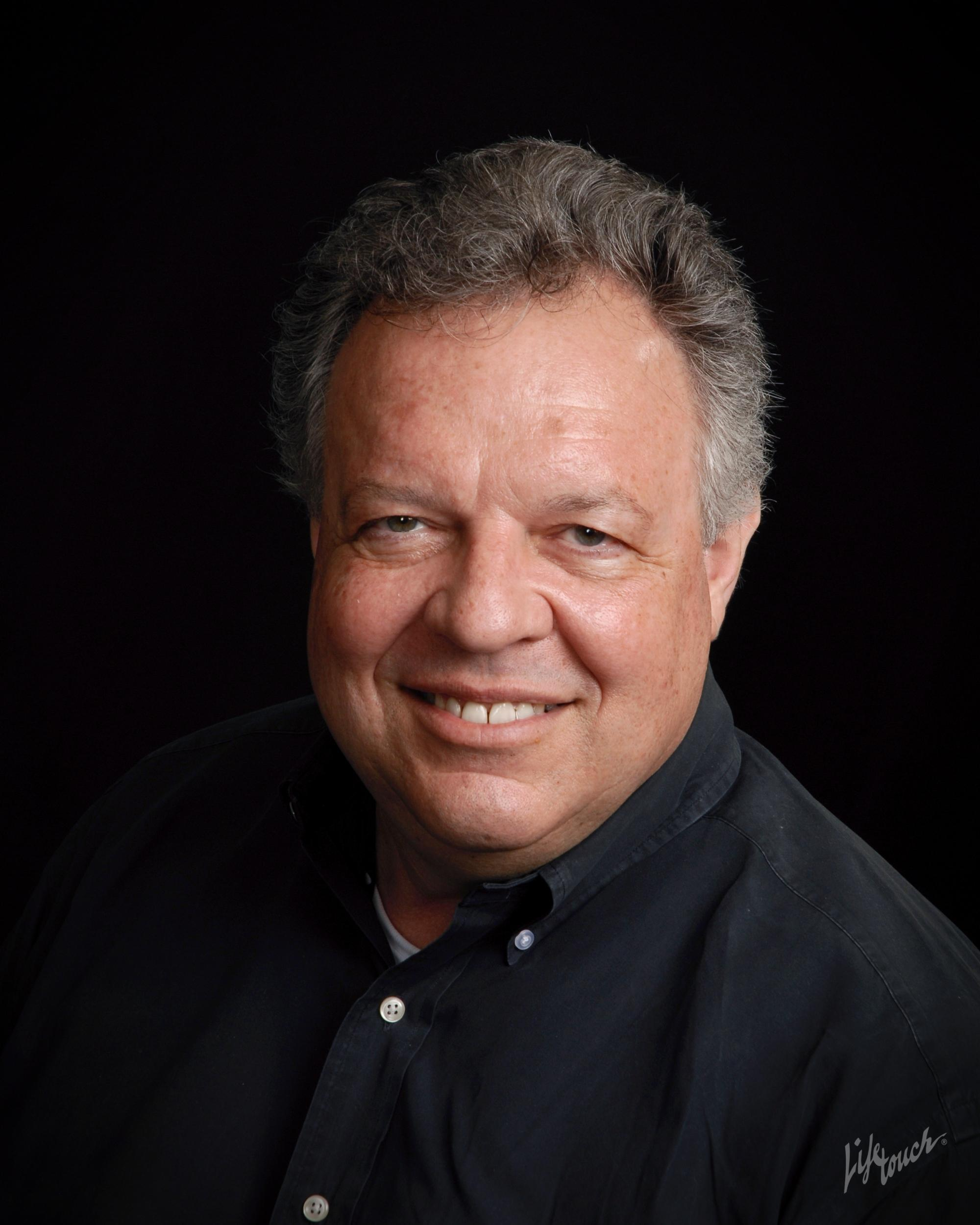
- Cottone in 2012
- Born: January 28, 1952 (age 74); Saint Louis, Missouri
- Occupations: Psychologist, Counselor Educator, Ethicist, Founder of the Church of Belief Science
- Known for: Applying social theory to otherwise understood psychological processes in counseling, psychology, and religion.

Robert Rocco Cottone (born January 28, 1952) is a psychologist, ethicist, counselor and poet and has been a professor in the Department of Counseling and Family Therapy at the University of Missouri–St. Louis since 1988, where he is a colleague of the social activist Mark Pope. He is also the founder of the Church of Belief Science. Academically, he is best known for his socially oriented theories of counseling and psychotherapy. In the mid-1980s he developed a “systemic theory of vocational rehabilitation”, which constitutes the first comprehensive social theory of vocational rehabilitation. He has been widely cited for his later work on advanced theories of psychotherapy, and he has been rated as having one of the highest publishing records among his peers. He published his first book, Theories and Paradigms of Counseling and Psychotherapy, in 1992, which defined Kuhnian paradigms of mental health treatment. He then developed a fully social model of decision making, the social constructivism model, taking decisions out of the head, so-to-speak, and placing them within the sphere of social discourse (cf., consensus decision making). His social theorizing advanced from that of social systems (in the 1980s Batesonian sense) to social constructions (in the 1990s and early 21st Century postmodern sense).

== Early life and education ==
Cottone was born and raised in the post–World War II Italian-American culture in the suburbs of St. Louis, Missouri. In his book, High Romance: A Book of Poetry, he describes his youth as "a story-book boyhood right from the pages of Mark Twain". He rode his bike for hours to watch the barges at the Alton lock and dam, and he was enthralled with the Mississippi River. He attended Catholic grade school (Our Lady of Good Counsel) and later switched to public schools in the St. Louis suburbs, graduating from Hazelwood High School in 1970. During the Vietnam War, he remained in the US and was a medic in the Air Force. He later attended the University of Missouri (A.B., clinical and counseling psychology, 1974; M.Ed., counseling, 1975) and the Saint Louis University (Ph.D., counseling and educational psychology, 1980).

== Academic accomplishments ==
Traditional counseling approaches are based on philosophies that attend to the individual experiencing emotional distress. This emphasis dates back to Freud, who defined an individual "psyche" — an internal non-physical aspect of self that is the framework for dealing with conflicts within the personality. Subsequent approaches to mental health primarily addressed individual problems as originating inside the person. Cottone's contribution to counseling and psychotherapy, along with other social theorists, was to apply relationship theory (focusing on interaction between people) to processes that were previously viewed as largely non-relational or individual. This was first accomplished in the field of vocational rehabilitation in the 1970s and 1980s with his "systemic theory of vocational rehabilitation". Until that time, vocational rehabilitation was viewed primarily as a psychological or medical program. He essentially developed a fully social model of vocational rehabilitation, meaning that individuals with disabilities are helped to fit within healthy and supportive relationship contexts (families, communities, cultures) rather than screened in or out of a rehabilitation program presumably on psychological traits or abilities. Cottone later developed a "paradigm" framework for counseling and psychotherapy, a theory about counseling theories that emphasized that all counseling is a relationship between a client (or clients) and a counselor. He argued that regardless of the treatment philosophy (which he classified broadly as the organic-medical, psychological, systemic-relational and social constructivism paradigms) a crucial element of counseling is the social process of consensualizing (coming to agreement about the nature of problems and the nature of solutions). At the turn of the century, he developed a social constructivism model of decision making, which is a fully relational model. By his model, decisions are made in the interpersonal processes of negotiating, consensualizing, and arbitrating (rather than an individual making a decision in his or her head). His most recent effort has been to apply relationship theory to the study of religion. He developed a relational philosophy of religion, providing a postmodern definition of belief: "acting with others as if some socially defined concept represents truth". Accordingly, religious truths are imbedded within communities of believers and not as external universal truths. His most compelling concept is a "bracketed absolute truth" or a "consensuality". A bracketed absolute truth is unquestionably true to people in a community (e.g., a religious community or a group of mental health professionals), but to people outside of the community, the group's truth looks relative. He used the example of the Heaven's Gate community, a religious group that committed mass suicide apparently without coercion. The group members believed an alien spaceship followed the Hale-Bopp comet and was to clear the earth of humanity (recycling). They committed suicide apparently so their spirits could rise up to the alien spaceship and escape the onslaught. Cottone argued that the ideals of Heaven's Gate were bracketed absolute truths, which were powerful in affecting the behavior of adherents to the degree that group members took their lives in deference to "truths" that looked ridiculous to outsiders. The idea of bracketed absolute truth (consensuality) explains how communities of believers (whether religious or not) hold fast to doctrine for better or for worse. Finally, Cottone attempted to unite science and religion through relationship theory. He defined science not as a process of establishing objective universal truths, but rather as a social process that reflects the culture, traditions and definitions of groups of scientists who (together) establish consensualities about how to practice science. Science, consequently, is viewed as a process of relationships, as people come to believe together in the methods of defining scientific truths. Therefore, science (physical or social), religion, or any belief system, is viewed as a result of interpersonal interaction. Science and religion are thereby united at a high theoretical level as representing bracketed absolute truths.

== The Church of Belief Science ==
In 2007, reacting to several personal crises and a disagreement over an annulment with the Roman Catholic Archdiocese of St. Louis, he founded the Church of Belief Science. The founding of the Church of Belief Science represents the establishment of the first coherently designed and acknowledged fully postmodern religion. He defined the Belief Science philosophy in two publications, a popular press book entitled Toward a Positive Psychology of Religion: Belief Science in the Postmodern Era, and a church manual, The Church of Belief Science: A Complete Guide to Philosophy and Practice, Second Edition. The Church of Belief Science philosophy applies postmodern theory (specifically social constructivism) to human relations in a religious context. He provided the postmodern definition of belief — belief is acting with others as if some socially defined concept represents truth. He argued that ancient religions are based on negative premises (e.g., sin, suffering, condemnation) and he made the case for a positive philosophy as a foundation for religious practice. In his religious works, he applied the concept of "consensualities" or "bracketed absolute truths" to explain the many practiced religions, because each religion represents absolute truth within its community of followers. This explains why there appear to be many competitive "absolute truths". For Christians, Jesus is God. For Buddhists, the teachings of the Buddha represent truth. For Muslims, Muhammad's works are prophetic. For Jews, the teaching of the prophets hold weight. The followers of each religion believe (or tend to believe) their religion represents "the only truth". Comparatively, the Church of Belief Science is built on 13 canons. The first is the concept of "consensualizing", which acknowledges that all truths have validity within communities of believers. But Cottone concluded that ethical standards must be accepted in a profession of faith, or beliefs that are potentially harmful to humanity may garner support within a community at the expense of some or all other people. The ethical canons of the Church of Belief Science are 12 ethical principles, including Optimism, Respect for Life, Loving Relations, Respect of Nature, Responsible Parenthood or Guardianship of Children, Free Religious Expression, Free Religious Practice, Non-maleficence, Beneficence, Non-offensiveness, Respect for Learning and Fairness. Members of the Church simply pledge to live by and uphold the canons. Representative quotes from his religion books are:

"The judgment day has come, and the judgment is clear. Ancient religions can no longer serve the needs of humanity."
"There is no independence, but only degrees of dependence."
"We are, therefore we think."
"One's relationships are greater than one's self."
"Relationships are everything, and everything is relationship."
"There is no mystery of faith. Faith is people coming to believe together."
"There is a "collective conscience - the group ethic that replaces and supersedes the concept of individual conscience."
"The positive ethic of the human spirit is viewed as contagious--the type of contagion that a positive psychology of religion represents."

== Poetry ==
Cottone is less known for his poetry than his other achievements. But he is an accomplished poet. In 2000, he self-published a book of poetry, Poetry for Men, which was his first attempt to communicate his personal story in artistic form. In 2012, he republished his poetry with additional works in his book, High Romance: A Book of Poetry, which is a compilation of his life's work in poetry. High Romance won the 2014 silver medal in eLit Book Awards poetry category.

== Awards ==
Over the course of his academic career, he has been presented with professional association awards for outstanding service (from the American Counseling Association) and research excellence, As a professor, he has received numerous awards for teaching excellence and an award for outstanding service to his university, the University of Missouri—St. Louis.

== Books ==
- Cottone, R. R. (1992). Theories and paradigms of counseling and psychotherapy. Needham Heights, MA: Allyn & Bacon.
- Cottone, R. R. (2000). Poetry for men. St. Louis, MO: River Rock.
- Cottone, R. R., & Tarvydas, V. M. (2007). Counseling ethics and decision making. Columbus, OH: Merrill Prentice Hall.
- Cottone, R. R. (2008). The Church of Belief Science: A complete guide to philosophy and practice. Cottleville, MO: The Church of Belief Science.
- Cottone, R. R. (2011). Toward a positive psychology of religion: Belief science in the postmodern era. Winchester, UK: John Hunt Publishing.
- Cottone, R. R. (2012). High romance: A book of poetry. Smashwords.
- Cottone, R. R. (2012). Paradigms of counseling and psychotherapy. Smashwords.
- Cottone, R. R. (2012). The Church of Belief Science: A complete guide to philosophy and practice, Second Edition. Smashwords.
