= KPE =

KPE or Kpe may refer to:

- Kallang–Paya Lebar Expressway. a highway in Singapore
- Kpe (Bakweri), an ethnic group of Cameroon
- Katholische Pfadfinderschaft Europas (Catholic Scouts of Europe), Scout Associations in Germany and Austria
- Konami Parlor Entertainment Inc., former Pachinko and Pachi equipment division of Konami Group
