= Selmeczi =

Selmeczi is a surname. Notable people with the surname include:

- György Selmeczi, Hungarian composer and pianist
- Gabriella Selmeczi, Hungarian parliamentarian
- Roland Selmeczi, Hungarian actor
