= The Current (newspaper) =

Student newspaper

- "UMSL's Independent Student News"
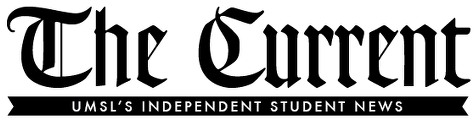
- Type: Weekly student newspaper
- School: University of Missouri–St. Louis
- Founded: 1966
- Headquarters: St. Louis, Missouri
- Circulation: 5,000
- Website: thecurrent-online.net

The Current is the official student newspaper of the University of Missouri–St. Louis. The Current is a tabloid published weekly on Mondays. The paper has won numerous awards, including "Best in State" from the Missouri College Media Association. Its office is located on the first floor of the Millennium Student Center on the north campus.

== History ==
The Current was preceded by the monthly Tiger Cub from 1960 to 1963 and the bi-weekly Mizzou News from 1963 to 1966. The newspaper's name became UMSL Current in 1966; "UMSL" was later dropped from the name. The name change was intended to foster an identity independent from the University of Missouri in Columbia. The name Current refers to the river motif associated with the student body's choice of "Riverman" as the school mascot. UMSL has since changed its mascot to the Triton.

=== Notable events ===
- The Current's former office, in a house at 7940 Natural Bridge Rd., was damaged by an arsonist in 1997.
- The Current broke a national story in September 1999 when it reported that the president of the Student Government Association was a convicted felon who had pleaded guilty to two felonies, stealing a credit device and fraudulent use of a credit device, shortly after he won the spring election.
- For the 2000–2001 school year, The Current won its first "Best Overall Newspaper" and "Sweepstakes" awards from the Missouri College Media Association.
- In 2003 and again in 2004, The Current faced cuts to the subsidy it receives from student activity fees. The situation generated media coverage in St. Louis. The funds eventually were restored.
- For the 2006–2007 school year, The Current won several first place awards from the Missouri College Media Association, including "Best Page One Design," "Best Editorial Page," and "Best in State."
- In 2009, the university suspended The Current's student organization privileges for issues related to payroll. The Current was put back in good standing with Student Life in August 2009.
- During the 2014–2015 academic year, The Current started a month-long crowdfunding campaign following the university's decision to completely cut the paper's funding. The campaign raised $8,923 of its $10,000 goal.

== Alumni ==
- Vincent Schoemehl – Mayor of the City of St. Louis 1981–1993
- Clint Zweifel – Missouri state treasurer
- Marty Hendin – vice president of community relations for the St. Louis Cardinals

== Organization ==
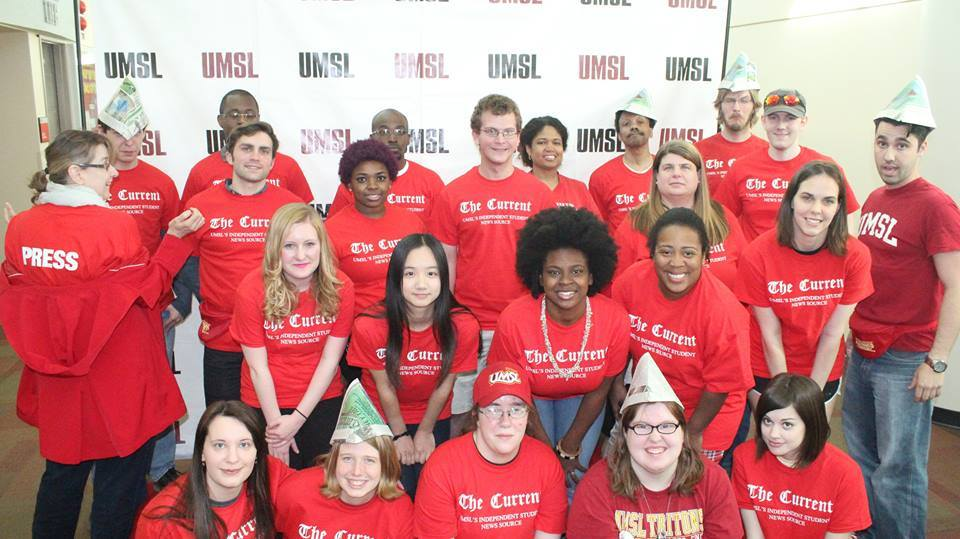
The 2014–2015 staff of The Current

The Current operates as an independent student organization with its own constitution. Each year, the newspaper's staff votes for a new editor-in-chief. As of 2014, The Current is funded solely by advertising sales. The staff consists of students and a faculty advisor.

== See also ==
- List of student newspapers
