= Arafan =

Arafan is a masculine given name. Notable people with the name include:

- Arafan Camara, Guinean politician and military official
- Arafan Diané (born 2007), Guinean basketball center
