= Servants of Jesus and Mary =

Roman Catholic congregation

The Servants of Jesus and Mary (Servi Jesu et Mariae – SJM) are a Roman Catholic congregation which was founded in 1988 by Andreas Hönisch, a former Jesuit, expelled by his congregation due to his Traditionalist Catholic views on both theology and pedagogy.

The first members were the German Catholic Scouts of Europe, founded in Giessen 1976. Until today, the pastoral care of European scout groups and youth work is one of the main priorities of the congregation. The first priests were trained and formed at the seminary of the Priestly Fraternity of Saint Peter and at the seminary of the Diocese of Fulda, but now they have their own seminary in Blindenmarkt in Lower Austria.

On 16 July 1994, cardinal Antonio Innocenti recognised Servi Jesu et Mariae as a Congregation of Papal Law, attached to the Pontifical Commission Ecclesia Dei. According to themselves, they try to fulfill the pre-conciliar life of the Society of Jesus. In accordance with that goal, they celebrate the Tridentine Mass, but also use the current missal of Pope Paul VI. Since 2014, Paul Schindele heads the congregation.
