= Andreas Hönisch =

Andreas Hönisch SJM (3 October 1930 – 25 January 2008) was the founder and Superior General of Servi Jesu et Mariae, and co-founder of the Katholische Pfadfinderschaft Europas.

== Biography ==
Hönisch founded the new order of the Servi Jesu et Mariae (SJM, Servants of Jesus and Mary) in 1988. That same year, he was expelled by the Jesuits due to his traditional views of the Catholic doctrine and pedagogy. The first members of the order came from the Catholic Scouts of Europe founded by Hönisch. The SJM were recognized as a Congregation of Papal Right in 1994. The congregation runs a boarding school in northern Germany and is engaged in the Pastoral care of the Katholische Pfadfinderschaft Euro Hönisch died on 25 January 2008 in Blindenmarkt, Lower Austria.
