= University of Missouri–St. Louis =

Public university in St. Louis, Missouri, US

Coordinates: 38.710200°N 90.311055°W

- Millenium Student Center
- Motto: Salus populi suprema lex esto (Latin)
- Motto in English: Let the welfare of the people be the supreme law
- Type: Public research university
- Established: 1963; 63 years ago
- Parent institution: University of Missouri System
- Academic affiliations: CUMU; GCU
- Endowment: $118.01 million (2023) (UMSL only) $2.24 billion (2023) (system-wide)
- Chancellor: Christopher D. Spilling (interim)
- Faculty: 680 (fall 2020)
- Administrative staff: 974 (fall 2020)
- Students: 8,023 (fall 2023)
- Location: St. Louis County, Missouri, United States
- Campus: Urban, 350-acre (0.5 sq mi; 141.6 ha)
- Colors: Red and gold
- Nickname: Tritons
- Sporting affiliations: NCAA Division II - GLVC
- Mascot: Louie
- Website: umsl.edu
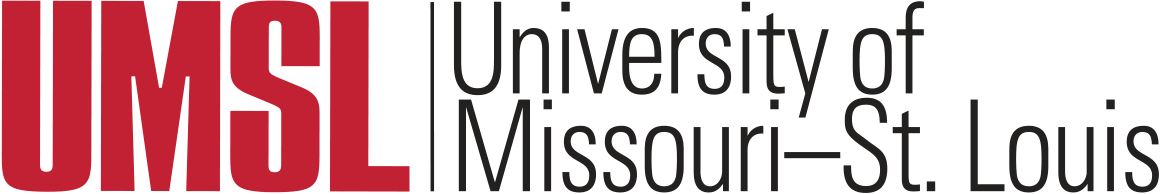

The University of Missouri–St. Louis (UMSL) is a public research university in St. Louis County, Missouri, United States. Established in 1963, it is the newest of the four universities in the University of Missouri System. Located on the former grounds of Bellerive Country Club, the university's campus stretches into the municipalities of Bellerive Acres (formerly "Bellerive"), Bel-Nor, Cool Valley, and Normandy. Additional facilities are located at the former site of Marillac College and at Grand Center, both in St. Louis city.

Bachelor's, Master's, and doctoral programs are offered through the College of Arts and Sciences, the College of Business Administration, the College of Education, the College of Nursing, the School of Social Work, and the College of Optometry. The business school is AACSB-accredited and is the only public university in the St. Louis area to also be AACSB-accredited in accounting. Preprofessional, a joint engineering program with Washington University in St. Louis, and evening programs are also offered. UMSL is home of an optometry school, providing its students with a doctorate (OD). The Pierre Laclede Honors College is UMSL's honors program. UMSL is classified among "R2: Doctoral Universities – High research activity".

For the fall 2023 semester, UMSL had 8,023 students attending classes on-campus, compared to 6,792 students taking classes off-campus, which was primarily students dual-enrolled at area high schools. The university had the equivalent of 5,654 full-time students. UMSL has historically been a commuter school for the St. Louis area.

== History ==
The impetus for a college campus in its current location began in 1957 when members of the Bellerive Country Club put their 53-year-old club house and 125-acre (50.6 ha) grounds on the market for $1.3 million as they planned to move to larger quarters in Town and Country, Missouri. At the same time members of Normandy, Missouri School District began debating the need of creating an affordable junior college to offer an alternative to the much more expensive privately owned Saint Louis University and Washington University in St. Louis. Country Club members approached the Board and the asking price was dropped to $600,000. A bond issue on September 30, 1958, received the necessary two-thirds majority and the golf club was turned over to Normandy on May 31, 1960. A group of board members and citizens popularly referred to as "The Committee of Twenty-eight" began the process to set up the junior college. The group met with Elmer Ellis, president of the University of Missouri.

Interest in a four-year school immediately arose. In 1963, the original MU campuses in Columbia and Rolla were merged with the privately owned University of Kansas City to form the present day University of Missouri System. The newly formed system immediately won permission to upgrade the Normandy center to a full-fledged four-year institution. The transfer from the Normandy school district to the University of Missouri System was delayed when the Missouri Supreme Court in 4–3 decision ruled that the school could not transfer the property without a formal open bid process. The Missouri General Assembly enacted legislation signed by Governor John Dalton on October 13, 1963, enabling the transfer and the university bought the property for $60,000 from unallocated funds at the university's disposal.

With expanding enrollment classes were held in a laundromat building at Natural Bridge and Hanley and in a church basement across from the campus while buildings were built on the site of the former Bellerive Country Club. Benton Hall opened in 1965, Clark Hall and the Library were the next buildings built. On July 23, 1973, an Ozark Airlines Fairchild Hiller FH-227B Flight 809 from Nashville International Airport crashed into the campus just east of the Mark Twain complex while attempting to land at Lambert-St. Louis International Airport. In 1976 Marillac College was acquired. It is now called the "south campus."

=== Chancellors ===
Since the University of Missouri–St. Louis's formation in 1965, the campus was led by 8 regular chancellors and 4 interim chancellors. An interim chancellor, Christopher D. Spilling, has been leading the campus since Kristin Sobolik's retirement began in July 2026.

== Express Scripts World Headquarters Campus at NorthPark ==
In 2007 Express Scripts opened its world headquarters on the campus north of University Place Drive and south of Interstate 70 in Missouri. It was the first Fortune 500 company to have its headquarters on a college campus. A second headquarters building adjoining the original one opened in 2008. Three additional Express Scripts have been added to the NorthPark development on the north side of I-70 including an Office and Data Center, Tech and Innovation Center, and Operations Center. In 2018 the majority of the 5,000 St. Louis Express Scripts employees work in the complex.

George Paz, CEO of Express Scripts at the time, was an UMSL graduate. Express Scripts, which leases rather than owns its headquarters buildings and other structures in NorthPark, received substantial tax breaks. Since the move the company has been an active partner with the university including contributing money to renovate the computer sciences building (Express Scripts Hall), raising funds for building projects, sponsoring a pre-collegiate bridge program for high school students and sponsoring a business incubator (Accentuate).

== Academics ==
Undergraduate demographics as of Fall 2023
Race and ethnicity	Total
White	61%
Black	19%
Asian	5%
Unknown	5%
Hispanic	4%
Two or more races	4%
International student	2%
Economic diversity
Low-income (Note: The percentage of students who received an income-based federal Pell grant intended for low-income students.)	40%
Affluent (Note: The percentage of students who are a part of the American middle class at the bare minimum.)	60%

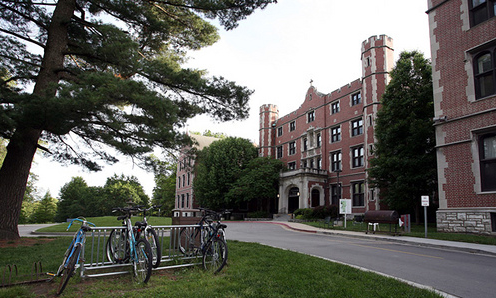
Provincial House, home of the Pierre Laclede Honors College

Divisions of the university include the College of Arts and Sciences, the College of Business Administration, the College of Education, the College of Fine Arts and Communication, the College of Nursing, the College of Optometry, the Pierre Laclede Honors College, the School of Social Work, the Graduate School, and the UMSL/Washington University Joint Undergraduate Engineering Program. In 2024, UMSL announced the creation of a School of Engineering that will offer traditional engineering programs on campus.

U.S. News & World Report's America's Best Graduate Schools 2018 ranked the university's doctoral degree program in Criminology & Criminal Justice 5th in the US.

UMSL's Master of Science in Cybersecurity was ranked No. 3 on the list of Best Master’s in Cybersecurity Degrees for 2025 by Fortune.

== Athletics ==
The Missouri–St. Louis (UMSL) athletic teams are called the Tritons, formerly known as the Rivermen and Riverwomen until 2007. The university is a member of the Division II ranks of the National Collegiate Athletic Association (NCAA), primarily competing in the Great Lakes Valley Conference (GLVC) since the 1996–97 academic year; which they accepted an invitation back in 1995. The Tritons previously competed in the Mid-America Intercollegiate Athletics Association (MIAA) from 1980–81 to 1995–96.

UMSL competes in 17 intercollegiate varsity sports: Men's sports include baseball, basketball, cross country, golf, soccer, swimming, tennis and track & field; women's sports include basketball, cross country, golf, soccer, softball, swimming, tennis, track & field and volleyball.

== Campus ==
The Campus is divided into two parts, a North Campus and a South Campus. UMSL can be visited using the St. Louis MetroLink light rail system, which has two stations on the campus: UMSL North and UMSL South.

Some key buildings include the Thomas Jefferson and Mercantile libraries, the Wellness and Recreation Center, University Meadows Apartments, the Millennium Student Center, Residential Life and Housing, Clark and Lucas Halls, the Touhill Performing Arts Center, Express Scripts Hall, and the Social Sciences Building. The Ward E. Barnes Library is located on the south campus and serves the College of Education and the College of Optometry.

== Student life ==
=== Student Government Association ===
The UMSL Student Government Association (SGA) is a student run government set up to provide a voice for students when dealing with administration of the University of Missouri–St. Louis (UMSL). SGA has three parts, the Executive Branch, the Assembly, and the Student Court, and also is governed by a student-wide approved constitution. SGA was started in 1963 when the university was founded and has gone through many constitutional changes, the most recent in 2004. SGA includes members from every student organization and students from every college on campus. This government incorporates both undergraduate and graduate in its student body. SGA has been instrumental in changes for students around the campus. It is responsible for approving student fees before they go to the board of curators of the University of Missouri System, and divides out the campus activities fees to fund student organizations' budgets.

=== Greek life ===
There are several social fraternities and sororities on campus.

=== Student media ===
The student newspaper, The Current, is a tabloid publishing 6,000 issues weekly. It is funded primarily by advertising revenue supplemented by student activity fees. It won "Best-in-State" from the Missouri Collegiate Media Association in 2002, 2007, 2008, and 2009.

The campus hosts a student radio station, UMSL Student Radio ("The U"), on 1620 AM and streaming online, and U TV which streams in the campus dorms and on a YouTube channel. The main studios are located in the Millennium Student Center, with a satellite studio in the Oak Hall Residence.

=== Nickname and mascot ===
In May 2007 the UMSL board of curators approved a change of nickname from the Rivermen (first used in the 1960s) to the Tritons. The new mascot was revealed at the "Pack the Stands" night in the fall of 2009, and was named "Louie" by the student body at the annual Mirthday celebration in spring of 2010. The Rivermen/Riverwomen nickname seldom had popular support, primarily for its unwieldy gender constructions.

== Pierre Laclede Honors College ==
The Pierre Laclede Honors College is the university's honors program. It was named in honor of the founder of the city of St. Louis. It has classrooms and student housing located in a former convent on the university's South Campus. The program offers classes that typically focus on specific topics in the humanities, while stressing the development and practice of students' writing skills. Students in the program publish an informal periodical, Brain Stew, which is independent of The Current. The college is also the center of activity for the publication of Bellerive, an annual literary magazine of artistic and literary works by UMSL students and faculty.

== Alumni ==
The university has 92,230 graduates, with 62,408 (68%) of them in the metropolitan St. Louis area.

== Notable faculty ==
- Ihsan Ali Al-Shehbaz – adjunct professor of Biology and curator at the Missouri Botanical Gardens
- Janet Catherine Berlo – art history professor (1979–1997)
- Joseph Carroll – Curators' Professor of English, pioneering scholar in the field of literature and evolution
- Michael Cosmopoulos – Hellenic Government-Karakas Foundation Chair of Greek Studies and professor of Archaeology
- Barbara Harbach – professor of Music
- Daniel Isom – former St. Louis Police Department chief of police, E. Desmond Lee Professor of Policing and the Community
- Minsoo Kang – professor of History
- Mark Pope – Thomas Jefferson Professor, Curators' Distinguished Professor Emeritus of Counseling (1997–2018)
- George Rawick
- Robert E. Ricklefs – Curators' Professor of Biology, member of the National Academy of Sciences
- Peter F. Stevens
- Lawrence H. White

== Notable alumni ==
- Jake Bain - former footballer, LGBTQ+ activist, and social worker
- Michael Block – golfer
- Paul Curtman – member of the Missouri House of Representatives
- Kathleen E. Fick – Air National Guard major general
- Chuck Gatschenberger – member of the Missouri House of Representatives
- Maryanne J. George – musician
- Timothy P. Green – state politician
- Marty Hendin – former vice president of Community relations for the St. Louis Cardinals
- Charles E. Hoffman – dean of Business School (2013– )
- Joan Kelly Horn – former United States congresswoman
- Daniel Isom – former St. Louis City chief of police
- William Knoedelseder – Pulitzer Prize-winning author, former business writer for the Los Angeles Times and TV producer
- Lyda Krewson – mayor of the City of St. Louis, 2017–2021
- Kevin Mansell – chief executive officer of Kohl's Corporation
- Natalie Sago – NBA referee
- Therese Sander – politician
- Vincent Schoemehl – mayor of the City of St. Louis, 1981–1993
- Phyllis Smith – television and film actress
- Chrissy Sommer – member of the Missouri House of Representatives
- Steve Stenger – politician, former county executive of St. Louis County
- Steven Tilley – Missouri speaker of the House of Representatives
- Clint Zweifel – state treasurer
- Kathleen Madigan - Stand up comedian
