= Bunny Andrews =

American football player

Profile
- Position: Quarterback
- Class: 1954

Personal information
- Born: September 12, 1931; Dallas, Texas, US
- Died: October 4, 2017 (aged 86); Austin, Texas, US
- Listed height: 5 ft 10 in (1.78 m)
- Listed weight: 170 lb (77 kg)

Career information
- High school: Wilson (Dallas)
- College: Texas (1953)

Awards and highlights
- Texas High School Football Hall of Fame inductee (1997); 1952 Southwest Conference Champion; 1953 Southwest Conference Co-Champion

John Boyette "Bunny" Andrews (September 12, 1931 - October 4, 2017) was an American football player who was the starting quarterback for the Texas Longhorns in 1953. He's also the younger brother of Texas legend, and sporting goods company CEO, William "Rooster" Andrews. In 1997, he was inducted into the Texas High School Football Hall of Fame as a special category inductee for his role as a great ambassador of the game.

== Early life ==
Andrews played high school football at Wilson High School in Dallas with Bill Forester where he was an outstanding quarterback and kicker who took his team to the state playoffs.

== College football ==
As a freshman, Andrews developed a friendship with fellow freshman and future All-American and Pro Bowl participant Carlton Massey who became his favorite target on the freshman team. He was the back-up quarterback in 1951 and 52, but managed to play in 8 games in those two years at quarterback, defensive back and punt returner.

Andrews entered the 1953 season as a team captain and starting quarterback, but sharing time with sophomore Charles Brewer. The Longhorns started the season ranked #11 in the country, but after losses to LSU and #15 Oklahoma in the first four games, Texas was unranked and Brewer was promoted to the starting role against Arkansas. Andrews backed him up for the remainder of the season. Despite playing the best game of his career against Arkansas, throwing the only touchdown pass and leading the team in passing yards, his playing time continued to drop. By the end of the season he was barely taking the field, playing in only one of the last three games, but he made that one count. In his last game he threw only one complete pass, the longest of his career, a 49-yard touchdown pass that proved the game winning score against TCU.

He finished his career at 2-2 as a starting quarterback.

== Later life ==
Andrews became a booster and supporter of football during a 50-year career as a sporting goods salesman, working with and for his brother Rooster. He remained involved in high school athletics and, as a result, was rewarded with induction into the Texas High School Football Hall of Fame as a special category inductee in 1997. He died in 2017 in Austin, Texas.
