= Joe Clark (footballer, born 1920) =

English footballer

Personal information
- Full name: Joseph Thomas Henry Clark
- Date of birth: 2 March 1920
- Place of birth: Bermondsey, England
- Date of death: 31 January 2008 (aged 87)
- Place of death: Ramsgate, England
- Height: 5 ft 9 in (1.75 m)
- Position: Full back

Senior career*
Years	Team	Apps	(Gls)
- Erith & Belvedere
- Dartford
- Gravesend United
–1946	Ramsgate Athletic		
1946–1947	Leyton Orient	18	(0)
1947–1949	Margate		
- Ramsgate Athletic
- * Club domestic league appearances and goals

Joseph Thomas Henry Clark (2 March 1920 – 31 January 2008) was an English professional footballer who played in the Football League for Leyton Orient as a full back.

== Honours ==
Margate

- Kent League First Division: 1947–48
- Kent League Cup: 1947–48
- Kent Senior Shield: 1947–48
