= K. M. Adimoolam =

Indian artist (1938–2008)

K. M. Adimoolam (Tamil: கே. எம். ஆதிமூலம்; 26 July 1938 – 15 January 2008) was an Indian abstract artist. He was born in 1938 in Tiruchirapalli in Tamil Nadu. In 1959, he moved to Chennai where under the influence of the sculptor Dhanapal, he enrolled in the Madras School of Arts and Crafts. After completing his Diploma in Advanced Painting in 1966, Adimoolam started a series of black and white portraits of Mahatma Gandhi. Sketching from photographs of the great man, he finished nearly a hundred drawings that moved over 60 years of the Mahatma’s life.

He was associated with Modern Tamil Writer's Group since the mid-Sixties and did a number of illustrations, book covers, and layouts. A recipient of prestigious awards from Lalit Kala Akademi (Chennai), Chitrakala Parishat (Bangalore), Bombay Art Society, Hyderabad Art Society, Academy of Fine Arts (Kolkata), besides the National Award from Lalit Kala Akademi (New Delhi), Adimoolam also served as a jury member for the National Exhibition of Art, New Delhi, and Bombay Art Society's Annual All India Art Exhibition. He was the Commissioner for the Indian section in the Third Ankara Biennial at Turkey in 1990. The book, Between The Lines, carries his drawings done between 1962 and 1996. He has also been involved in the Madras Art Movement, which emerged in the early 1960s under the leadership of K.C.S. Paniker. Adimoolam died on 15 January 2008 in Chennai.

Adimoolam once said:

"Child or middle-aged man, my heart and mind are filled with nature, at every moment. It is a wonderful experience; this love and awe that provoke my ever creative and anxious mind to penetrate the reality that lies beyond our vista. Thus, my canvases mirror my mind's journey through Nature - not as realistic landscapes or seascapes but planes of colors creating an esoteric aura on a transcendental level. For two decades, my concept has been evolving unilaterally with mere technical innovation and a different exploitation of hues.”
