= Harry Gill (RAF officer) =

- Born: 30 October 1922; Chesterfield
- Died: 20 January 2008 (aged 85)
- Military career
- Allegiance: United Kingdom
- Branch: Royal Air Force
- Rank: Air-Vice Marshal
- Nickname: Jimmy
- Conflicts: World War II
- Awards: Companion of the Order of the Bath; Order of the British Empire

Air Vice-Marshal Harry Gill CB OBE (30 October 1922 – 20 January 2008) also known Jimmy, was a British World War II fighter pilot who later rose as air vice-marshal and became the Director-General of Engineering and Supply Policy at the Ministry of Defence in 1976. He also received the King's Silver Medal at Bisley in 1951.

== Early life ==
Gill was born on 30 October 1922 in Chesterfield, England. He moved to Newark-on-Trent as a child and was educated at Newark Technical College.

== Career ==
Gill trained as a pilot in the United States, he flew Hurricanes (with 279 Sqn) during the war and Mosquito FB.VIs (with 4 Sqn) in the immediate post-war period. He was appointed OBE for his service in Aden during its evacuation in 1967. In 1979, he retired from the RAF. He had been appointed a companion of the Order of the Bath the previous year.

== Later life ==
After his retirement, he remained closely associated with the Royal Air Force, serving for many years as president of the Newark Branch of the Royal Air Forces Association and he was also closely linked to the Air Training Corps (ATC), of which he was a member in his youth (with 47F Sqn at Grantham, when still an Air Defence Cadet Corps Squadron - forerunner of the ATC).

He died on 20 January 2008.

His Mosquito, TA 122, is being restored and will be displayed at the de Havilland Museum at London Colney.
