= Doreen Tovey =

English writer (1918–2008)

Doreen Tovey (24 October 1918 – 13 January 2008) was an English writer. She was the author of more than a dozen books about the life she and her husband 'Charles' (real name René) shared with their Siamese cats and other animals in Somerset, England. The books have sold more than 150,000 copies in eight countries.

== Bio ==
Tovey was born in Bristol and then grew up in Southville.

She was president of the Siamese Cat Club, president of the West of England Cat Club and president of the RSPCA for North Somerset.

Tovey died in 2008.

== Books ==
- Cats in the Belfry, 1958
- Cats in May (US title Cats in Cahoots), 1959
- Donkey Work, 1963
- Life with Grandma, 1964
- Raining Cats and Donkeys, 1968
- The New Boy, 1970
- Double Trouble, 1972
- Making the Horse Laugh, 1974
- The Coming of Saska, 1976
- A Comfort of Cats, 1979
- Roses Round the Door, 1982
- Waiting in the Wings, 1986
- More Cats in the Belfry, 1997
- Cats in Concord, 2001
