= Rooster Andrews =

American football player and manager (1923–2008)

Personal information
- Nickname: Rooster
- Born: 1 March 1923 Dallas, TX
- Died: 21 January 2008 (aged 84) Austin, TX
- Years active: 1943-1945
- Height: 4 ft 11 in (150 cm)
- Weight: 130 lb (59 kg; 9 st 4 lb)

Sport
- Sport: Football, baseball
- Position: Placekicker
- College team: Texas Longhorns

William Edward "Rooster" Andrews, Jr. (March 1, 1923 - January 21, 2008) was a former University of Texas team manager who gained fame as a drop-kicking player, whom the media called the "All-American Waterboy." He later opened a sporting goods store and, in that capacity, developed the university's iconic Longhorn logo and changed the uniform color to burnt orange. He was also the older brother of Texas starting quarterback John "Bunny" Andrews.

== Early life ==
William Rooster, Jr. was born in Dallas, TX, where his father worked in the pursing [sic?] office of Texas Pacific Railways.

As a 17-year-old at Woodrow Wilson High School in Dallas, Andrews participated in the 1936 Texas state championship track meet as the school's manager. There he met legendary Texas track coach Clyde Littlefield who put Andrews to work setting up for the Texas Relays. Andrews ended up staying three extra days to work even after the track team left on the bus for Dallas. For this he was paid $9. Malcolm Kutner, a classmate of Andrews, asked Texas football coach Dana X. Bible to bring Andrews on as a team manager, but said that Andrews would need a job. Texas A&M coach Homer Norton also wanted Andrews as a manager and even sent him a dorm room key. But the night before Andrews was to leave for Texas A&M, Andrews' classmate called to tell him that Bible had found him a job through the National Youth Administration so Andrews headed to Austin instead.

== Texas athletics ==
At Texas, Andrews was the team manager from 1941 to 1945 and roommate with future Pro Football Hall of Fame quarterback Bobby Layne. In 1943, during World War II when many schools suspended their football programs due to lack of men, Texas had trouble finding a kicker. Andrews showed off his drop kick style in practice, an unusual style at the time, and earned a chance to play by winning a kicking contest in practice. His first chance came against TCU when he kicked two extra points and had a third attempt blocked, enraging TCU coach Dutch Meyer who saw the use of the team's water boy as an insult. Meyer dared coach Dana X. Bible to use Andrews the following week against Texas A&M and Bible did, with Andrews kicking two more extra points and having a field goal blocked. Andrews continued to play in the 1944 and 1945 seasons. On a few occasions he faked the kick and instead threw passes to Layne, a play that succeeded once against Oklahoma in 1945 and once in his final game, the 1946 Cotton Bowl. Twice he connected with Layne for touchdowns. But during those later years, Andrews primary job was to keep his roommate, hard-partying, hard-drinking quarterback Bobby Layne, out of trouble.

In addition to managing the football team, Andrews played seven different positions for the UT baseball team as a part-time player in 1944–45, and was a manager in 1946. Once sent in to draw a base on balls, he hit a game-winning home run instead.

The nickname "All-America Waterboy" came not from his play on the field, but from serving as manager in college postseason games (the 1941 East-West Shrine game and College All-Star games in Chicago every year from 1942 to 1946). The nickname "Rooster" came from a college incident in which Andrews broke an arm trying to retrieve a chicken from a tree.

== Longhorn logo and burnt orange ==
The "Steerhead" Logo, developed by Rooster Andrews, was named the best logo in College Sports by Athlon Sports in 2013

In 1961, coach Darrell Royal talked to Andrews about ways to improve the Longhorns uniform. Back then, the Longhorns' helmets were white with orange numerals on the side and a thin orange stripe down the center. Andrews told Royal he had an idea and would work on it that night. He found a Longhorn head in a book, traced it and colored it in with crayon, and then found a distributor to make decals of the logo. They were added onto the helmets of the 1961 Longhorn football team and have remained there ever since. In 2013, Athlon Sports named the steerhead logo that Andrews developed as the nation's best college football logo.

One year later, Royal and Andrews worked together to change the uniform color from the bright orange that was then used to the burnt orange in use today. Royal wanted the color to be darker, closer to the color of the football, the way the practice uniforms looked when they were stained with sweat after a hot, hard practice. Andrews soaked a uniform in water and showed it to a manufacturer who was then able to make uniforms with the burnt orange color.

== Later life ==
In 1946, Andrews turned down an offer to be a manager with the Miami Seahawks of the All-America Football Conference to become a salesman for a C&S Sporting Goods. The self-described jockstrap peddler later became president of the company from 1961 to 1969. In 1969 he, along with his brother Bunny, moved to the Texas Sporting Goods Company becoming a vice-president and manager of the Austin store. In 1971 he opened the first of his own sporting goods stores in Austin. At its peak, Rooster Andrews Sporting Goods had four retail locations across Austin, an annual sales volume of $5 million, and employed more than 70 people. Andrews married his sweetheart Betty Jane Burk and had four children. He was an active member of the community serving on boards and as presidents of many Austin civic organizations including the Optimist Club and the Travis County Grand Jury.

Andrews became a Texas Longhorn legend who dined regularly with Longhorns football coaches Darrell Royal and Mack Brown and became friends with everyone involved in Texas included Presidents Johnson, George H. W. Bush and George W. Bush.

Among other honors Andrews received over the years, he was inducted into the Longhorn Hall of Honor in 1966 and to the Austin Athletic Hall of Fame. He was given the Doak Walker NFL Alumni Award in 1987 for contributions to football. He was named to National Sporting Goods Hall of Fame in 1990. In 1992 he became the only person in the Texas High School Football Hall of Fame who never played high school football. He was inducted for his contributions as a booster of the game.

He was Inducted into the Texas Track and Field Coaches Hall of Fame, Class of 2016.

Andrews was also true to the roots that brought him to the University of Texas as an Official and Head Judge of the Finish Line for the Texas Relays for 60 years. The Finish Line at Mike A. Myers Stadium has a plaque at the finish line Dedicating it as the "Rooster Andrews Finish Line". He was Inducted into the Texas Track and Field Coaches Association Hall of Fame, Class of 2017.

Rooster Andrews died on January 21, 2008, in Austin, TX from respiratory failure. After his death, a room at Texas' Moncrief-Neuhaus building was named in his honor.
