= Charles E. Hoffman =

American business executive

Charles Hoffman
- Education: University of Missouri–St. Louis
- Title: Dean of the College of Business Administration at University of Missouri–St. Louis
- Term: September 2013 – present

Charles "Charlie" E. Hoffman (born January 27, 1949) is an American business executive, having served two publicly traded companies as CEO for over 10 years. As of September 2013, he is the dean of the College of Business Administration at the University of Missouri–St. Louis, his alma mater.

== Early life ==
Hoffman grew up in St. Louis County, Missouri. He served in the Air Force during the Vietnam War era. Hoffman received a Bachelor of Science, in 1974, and a masters of business administration, 1976, from University of Missouri–St. Louis (UMSL).

== Career ==
Before Rogers, Hoffman served as President, Northeast region, for Sprint PCS. He was responsible for operations in the largest region in the U.S. and successfully launched PCS wireless service in nine markets. Hoffman also spent 16 years at SBC Communications (now AT&T) in various senior management positions, including Director General (President) of Telcel, the national wireless carrier in Mexico. During this time, he also served as Managing Director-Wireless for SBC International. Preceding this, Hoffman was president and General Manager of SBC's Cellular One operations, during which he turned around the second and fourth largest SBC markets, Washington/Baltimore and Boston, from underperformers to market leaders in record time.

Hoffman was president and chief executive officer (CEO) of Rogers Wireless, Inc., at the time Canada's largest wireless service provider. He held this position from January 1998 to June 2001. Under his leadership, the company grew from fourth to first place in a market of four national wireless providers. He also successfully negotiated the sale of one-third interest in this publicly traded company (NYSE and TSE) to a partnership of AT&T and British Telecom.

In June 2001, Hoffman became president and CEO of Covad. He served in the position from June 2001 to April 2008. Hoffman took Covad through bankruptcy and negotiated the sale of the company to Platinum Equity in late 2007, and stepped down from Covad when the acquisition was completed.

He is currently a member of the board of directors of Synchronoss Technologies. He previously served on the boards of Chordiant Software, Softlayer Technologies and Tollgrade Communications. All three companies were profitably sold while Hoffman served on the board of directors. He attended the Directors College at Stanford University in 2006 and the Corporate Governance program at Northwestern University's Kellogg School in 2009.

== Personal life ==
He and his wife Maureen have four children and eight grandchildren. His grandson Thomas attends his alma mater, the University of Missouri-Saint Louis.
