= Mildred Callahan Jones =

American businessman (1943–2008)

Mildred Callahan Jones (September 19, 1943 – January 17, 2008) was an American businesswoman known as the "flag lady", who pioneered and helped develop the decorative flag industry.

== Early life ==
Mildred Callahan was born on September 19, 1943, in Chase City, Virginia, and grew up on a tobacco farm. She earned her degree in nursing from what is now called Virginia Commonwealth University.

She met her husband, Thomas Jones, a lawyer, while working as a nursing manager at the Medical College of Virginia. The two bought their first home in the Fan district of Richmond, Virginia, which is one of the largest remaining Victorian neighborhoods left in North America.

== Flag making ==
Jones originally started making flags as a hobby. Jones first purchased a piece of Scandinavian cloth in 1971 to guide party guests to her home in the Fan district section of Richmond, Virginia.

However, her interest in flag making turned into a small business after she hung a giant flag outside her home with the words, "It's a Boy", announcing the birth of her son in 1975. Jones, and her idea for decorative flags, soon propelled her into the national consciousness. Reporters from around the country, including ABC's Good Morning America and the Wall Street Journal, soon began arriving at her Richmond home to file stories on the "flag lady," as Jones became known.

She founded her company, Festival Flags Unlimited Inc., The Original Decorative Flag, in 1977. In 1978, Jones and her family moved to the family's new home at 2307 Monument Avenue, which was also in Richmond's Fan district. She immediately put her new basement to good use as the center of her flag making company. (Her previous workroom had been a small guest bedroom in her old home.)

Jones specialized in one-of-a-kind stitched nylon flags personalized for her individual customers. Famous clients and customers reportedly included former United States President Ronald Reagan, as well as actors Jack Lemmon and Carol Channing. A special custom made flag was ordered by the Governor of Virginia as a gift to actor James Garner after he filmed a television movie in Richmond.

However, as the popularity of her trademark "It's a Girl" and "It's a Boy" decorative flags soared, Jones and her company soon began mass-producing flags to be sold in major retail stores. She continued to hand sew special order flags throughout her career.

She expanded her Festival Flags business outside of her home in 1983, when she purchased and renovated a rundown property at 322 W. Broad Street in Richmond. The new facility allowed for the rapid expansion and manufacture of her decorative flags, banners, pennants and wall decorations. The building also housed left apartments which helped to redevelop the then declining neighborhood.

Over the years Jones and Festival Flags produced thousands of flags and other related products. Her flags were used in a wide array of public events and venues around the world and beyond, including art exhibitions, colleges, churches, such as the National Cathedral, museums, playgrounds and even several castles in England. Jones' flags were even carried into space on board the Space Shuttle Discovery in 1985.

Festival Flags generated more than $1 million in sales revenue a year at the peak of its success in the mid-1990s. However, sales fell to approximately 100,000 a year by 2000, which corresponded to trends within the flag industry.

In the process, Jones also became deeply committed to her Richmond and Fan district community. She was a co-founder of the Old and Historic Broad Street Association, which worked to restore homes and buildings in the Presidents Row section of the city. The Richmond neighborhood is now considered an arts and dining district. She was also involved in other urban restoration and preservation organizations, including the Fan District Association and the Monument Avenue Preservation Society.

Jones sold her flag business in 2003 due to chronic health problems. She was a diabetic and had undergone quadruple-bypass surgery in 1998 before suffering a series of strokes in 2002.

== Death ==
She died on January 17, 2008, at her home in Richmond, Virginia, at the age of 64. She was buried in Hollywood Cemetery. She was survived by her husband, Thomas O. Jones, her son, Jonathan and her mother, Ida Mildred Callahan.
