= Chemoil =

Global marine-fuel supplier and trader

Chemoil Energy Limited
- Type: Public
- Traded as: SGX: AV5
- Founded: San Francisco, California, USA (1981)
- Founder: Robert V. Chandran
- Headquarters: Singapore
- Products: Marine fuel
- Website: chemoil.com

Chemoil Energy Limited is an oil trading company incorporated in Hong Kong and has its headquarters in Singapore. The company is amongst the largest independent physical suppliers of marine fuel products in the world. It has physical operations in Los Angeles, New York, Houston, Singapore, Panama and the Amsterdam-Rotterdam-Antwerp area (ARA region).

The company's main business is providing fueling services for ships in port. They buy fuel oil from various suppliers, transport, store and blend them and finally deliver to oceangoing ships, containers, tanker fleets, time charter operators and marine fuel traders.

It was listed on Singapore Exchange Securities Trading Limited on 14 December 2006. It was voluntarily delisted in April 2014.

== History ==
Chemoil was founded by Indian businessman Robert Chandran in the state of California in 1981. It then expanded operations to Houston in 1986 and to New York in 1997. In 1997, Itochu Corporation purchased 50% of ownership of Chemoil. In 1998 Chemoil entered Europe having its office in Rotterdam. It expanded to Singapore in 2000 and Panama in 2003. In December 2009 commodities trader Glencore purchased a majority stake in Chemoil. In 2012 Glencore increased their stake to 89.04%. In February 2014, Glencore Xstrata announced plans to increase ownership to 100% and delist it from the SGX.

Robert Chandran died January 7, 2008, from injuries sustained when a helicopter he was traveling in crashed in the Riau Province of Indonesia.On January 14, 2008, Chemoil announced that they appointed Clyde Michael Bandy as its chairman and chief executive officer with immediate effect. Mr. Bandy was unanimously elected by Chemoil's board of directors to undertake the position following the death of Chemoil's founder, Robert Chandran, on January 7, 2008. Mr. Bandy has been Chemoil's lead independent director since August 31, 2006.

Mr. Bandy retired from Chemoil in 2010. Tom Reilly was appointed Chemoil's new CEO in January 2011.

Following the acquisition by Glencore in 2014, several key executives departed. In July 2014, Ship & Bunker reported that Chemoil confirmed that Reilly left his role as chief executive officer of Chemoil Corporation effective June 30, 2014. Following Mr. Reilly's departure, former Chevron Senior Vice President Michele J. Swanson became president and chief executive officer of Chemoil until her departure in 2017 after obtaining a Chemoil subsidiary, Prista Oil.
