= Georg Restle =

German television presenter and journalist (born 1965)

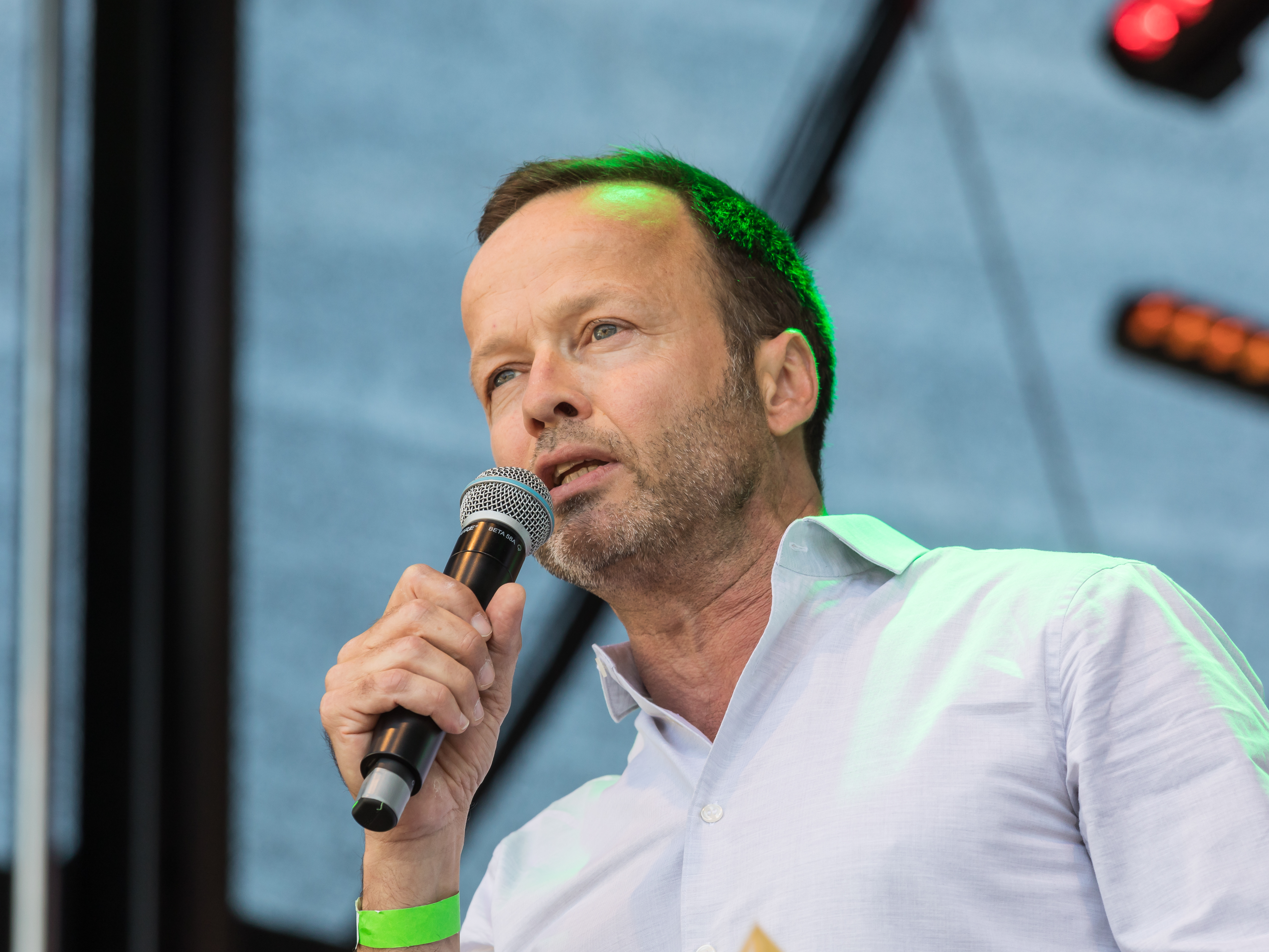
Restle in 2018

Georg Restle (born 1965 in Esslingen am Neckar) is a German journalist and television presenter.

== Life ==
Restle studied law at University of Freiburg and international law at London School of Economics. He works as journalist for German broadcaster WDR. He presents German political magazine Monitor. In November 2023, the AfD party in Thuringia was ordered by a district court to allow Monitor to report at the party convention; Thuringia AfD spokesman Stefan Möller announced that the party would continue to pursue the case in court in order to clarify general legal aspects.
