= Catholic Scouts of Europe =

German Catholic scouting organization

Katholische Pfadfinderschaft Europas
- Location: Herbstein-Rixfeld
- Country: Germany
- Founded: 1976
- Founders: Andreas Hönisch SJM, Günther Walter
- Membership: 2,500
- Bundesfeldmeister: Martin Hafner
- Bundesmeisterin: Edeltraut Weßler
- Affiliation: International Union of Guides and Scouts of Europe
- Website http://www.kpe.de

The Katholische Pfadfinderschaft Europas (KPE; roughly Catholic Guides and Scouts of Europe) is a German Catholic scouting organization with 2,500 members. It is part of the International Union of Guides and Scouts of Europe. Katholische Pfadfinderschaft Europas – Österreich (KPE-Ö) is an Austrian sister organization which works closely with its German counterpart.

The KPE is closely linked with the religious institute Servi Jesu et Mariae (SJM) of the Catholic Church.

== Self image of the KPE ==
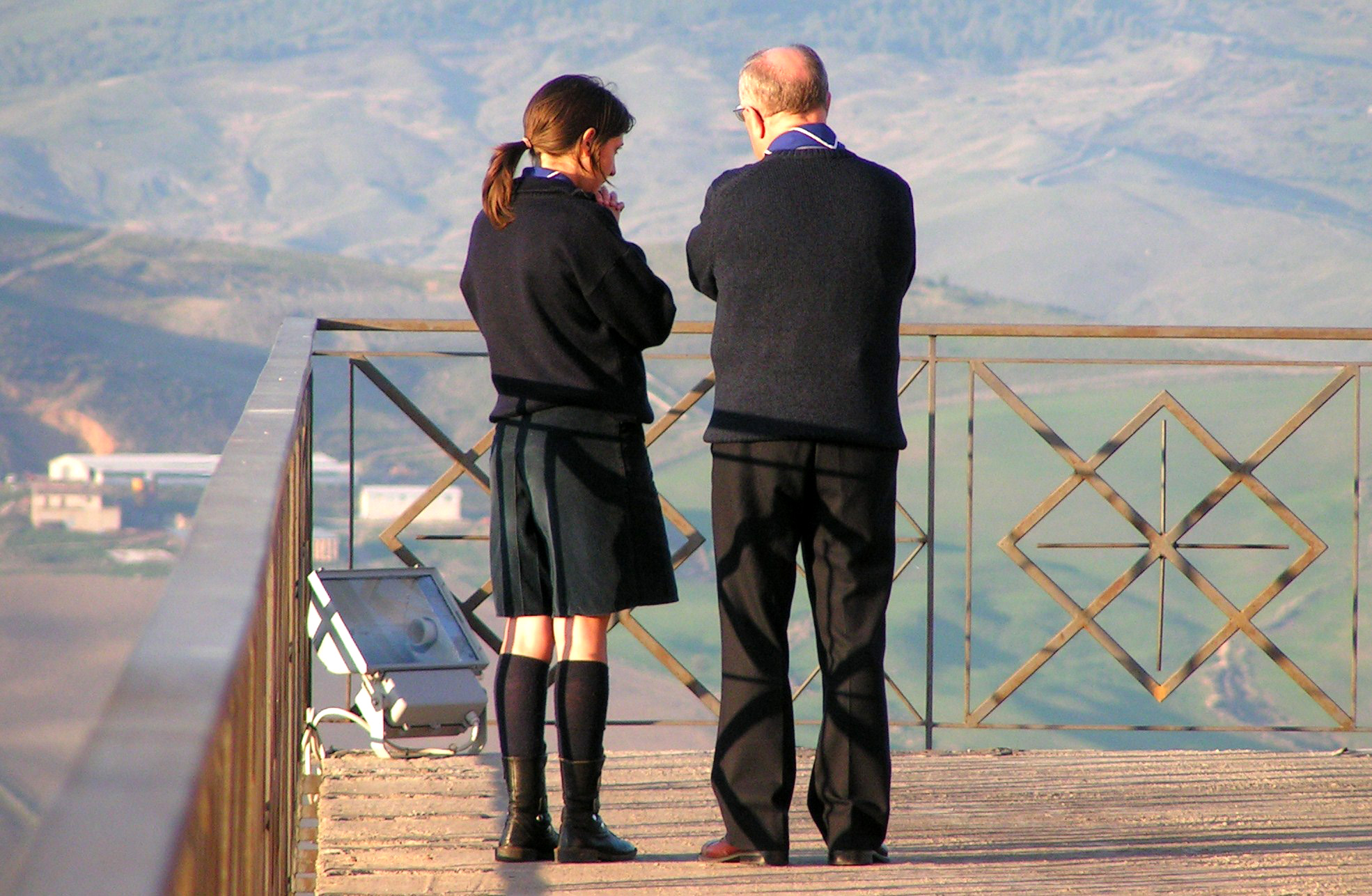
A Catholic Scouts of Europe participant receiving the Sacrament of Penance.

The KPE describes its activities as follows: "By our education according to the scouting method, we promote the development of the entire person of girls and boys. In this manner, they may become responsible, Christian personalities who develop their abilities and talents, who form their lives based on the power of Faith and take on responsibility for society and the Church."

The constitution of the KPE lists five concrete goals of its youth work:

1. Physical development
2. Sensitivity for the concrete and practical life and artistic talents
3. Development of character and personality
4. Sensitivity for charity and service for others
5. Sensitivity for God and Christian education

Regarding its relationship to other youth organizations, the KPE “works for friendly and brotherly relations with other organizations, groups and movements of Christian and non-Christian Scouting movement in order to establish together a just and fraternal society in the spirit of Baden-Powell in accordance with his original pedagogical concept.”

== History ==
The KPE was founded on February 15, 1976. Its founding members had left the Deutsche Pfadfinderschaft Sankt Georg because they felt that their ideas about Scouting and spirituality had been disregarded in the reforms of the 1960s and 1970s. Andreas Hönisch, late Superior General of the SJM, and Günther Walter were both instrumental in the KPE's founding.

In 1977, the Fédération du Scoutisme Européen (FSE), predecessor of the Union Internationale des Guides et Scouts d’Europe, admitted the KPE as full member.

Some local groups left the KPE in 1986 because of its rigid structure and founded a new Scouting organization, the Europapfadfinder Sankt Michael.

The Diocese of Augsburg recognized the KPE as a Catholic youth organization in 1992. The KPE's umbrella organization, UIGSE, was recognized by the European Parliament in 1984, and as lay organization by the Holy See in 2003.

In 1994, the Südwestfunk broadcast the movie "Himmel und Hölle" (Heaven and Hell), that was based on incidents within the KPE. Its authenticity is questionable, a court decision forbade mentioning possible connections between the movie and the KPE in public. Despite this decision the KPE was heavily attacked by the press after each broadcast of the movie.

After press reports on the KPE membership of one superior of the seminary in St. Pölten during the St. Pölten pornography scandal the Conference of the German Bishops reiterated that the KPE is not recognized by the Bund der Deutschen Katholischen Jugend, the union of recognised Catholic youth organizations in Germany. The statement was interpreted by a German TV magazine as an official disassociation.

Later in the same year some groups and most of the leaders of the Austrian sister organization KPE-Ö (Katholische Pfadfinderschaft Europas – Österreich) left the organization and accused the German KPE and Andreas Höhnisch of interfering in its internal affairs.

The Conference of German Bishops recognized the organization in December 2021.

== External Observers ==
The activity of the Catholic Scouts of Europe (KPE) is judged by external observers with mixed opinions. There are both supporters of the KPE as well as critics. Especially during the 1990s, the work of the KPE was discussed controversial.

Critics of the KPE focus mainly on two points, namely:

- proselytization
- cooperation with Catholic fundamentalist groups

Critics accuse the KPE of forcing its members to participate in religious exercises, especially in attending mass and regular confession. In some cases younger Scouts and Guides had been horrified by drastic descriptions of Hell.

The cooperation of the KPE with the Servants of Jesus and Mary (SJM) is used as evidence when accusing the KPE of Catholic traditionalism. Until 1992, the adherence to the Work of the Holy Angels was officially advocated by the KPE.

In 2011, the executive governing board of the KPE issued an official statement to each of the points made by critics. The KPE expressly distanced itself from any nationalistic ideology and anti-Semitism. In questions of religion, the KPE rejects all questionable teachings which deviate from the common teachings of the Catholic Church. In addition, the KPE insistently rejects pressure and force as a pedagogical means of teaching the Catholic faith. Contacts to the Work of the Holy Angels – both organizational as well as concerning the content – are also emphatically denied.

Alongside of the critics, there are also positive recommendations for the youth work of the KPE, even from official positions in the Catholic Church. Florian Wörner, auxiliary bishop of the diocese of Augsburg and formerly the director of the youth office of this diocese, explained on occasion of a meeting in February 2013 with the KPE: “I view my coming as a note of thanks on the KPE and as an expression of my valuation of their work. During my activities as director for the episcopal youth office over the last seven years, I have experienced the cooperation with the KPE to be extremely good and transparent. It was an open and good together. The KPE participated in a very positive way in the different areas of diocesan pastoral work.” Wörner also appreciatively mentioned that the members of the KPE apply themselves outside of their own organisation in different activities in the diocese such as Nightfever.

During his pastoral experience as cathedral prelate in Mainz, Guido Becker described the activities of the KPE as “ray of light in dark times”. For him, “the fruits of Catholic youth ministry in the KPE are openly apparent.”

Before his election to the papacy, Joseph Kardinal Ratzinger, later Pope Benedict XVI, “explicitly praised and recommended any kind of support for the KPE”: “The youth work in the KPE, as a whole, has to be considered positively and it gives many young people a solid foundation for their way in life.”

In 2018, the German journalist Georg Restle kept qualifying KPE's publications as anti-Semitic, which had been legally confirmed by Supreme Court Rule in Vienna before.

== Literature ==
=== KPE’s works ===
- Andreas Hönisch: Liebe Freunde von Pfadfinder Mariens. Volume 1. SJM-Verlag, Meckenheim 2001. ISBN 3-932426-20-7
- Alfred Pokorn / Günther Walter: Pfadfinder-Handbuch, 5th extended and revised edition. SJM-Verlag, Neusäß 2010. ISBN 978-3-932426-02-5
- Barbara Roczniak / Anton Bentlage: Leitfaden für die Wölflingsstufe. SJM-Verlag, Neusäß 2013. ISBN 978-3-932426-57-5
- Günther Walter: Deine Sippe, Kornett. 2nd extended edition. SJM-Verlag, Neusäß 2002. ISBN 978-3-932426-22-3

=== External works ===
- Heiner Boberski: Das Engelwerk. Theorie und Praxis des Opus Angelorum. Otto Müller Verlag, Salzburg 1993, ISBN 3-7013-0854-3 (particularly pages 229–235, in chapter Freunde und „verwandte Seelen“).
- Bundesvorstand der Deutschen Pfadfinderschaft Sankt Georg (Hrsg.): Arbeitspapier mit Dokumenten zum Phänomen der „Katholischen Pfadfinderschaft Europas“ (KPE) sowie zu neueren Entwicklungen im Spektrum katholischer Splittergruppen. Georgs-Verlag, Neuss 1994
- Hubert Kohle: Fundamentalistische Marienbewegungen. In: Wolfgang Beinert, Heinrich Petri (Hrsg.): Handbuch der Marienkunde. 2nd volume, Pustet, Regensburg 1997, ISBN 978-3-7917-1527-8, pages 60–106 (particularly 77–79)
- Thomas M. Hofer: Gottes rechte Kirche. Ueberreuter Verlag, Vienna 1998. ISBN 3-8000-3675-4 (chapter Die Katholische Pfadfinderschaft Europas, pages 142–152)
