= Marianne Kiefer =

German actress (1928–2008)

Marianne Kiefer (3 September 1928 – 4 January 2008) was a German actress. Born in Dresden, she was the daughter of a married couple of artists. She died in Kreischa.

== Filmography ==
- Langer Samstag (2003)
- Drei reizende Schwestern (1984–1991)
- Mensch, mein Papa...! (1988)
- Polizeiruf 100 (1987)
- Maxe Baumann aus Berlin (1987)
- Leute sind auch Menschen (1986)
- Beswingt und heiter (1983)
- Maxe Baumann (1981–1982)
- Engel im Taxi, Ein (1981)
- Ich bin nicht meine Tante (1980)
- Altes Modell, Ein (1976)
- Heiraten/Weiblich (1975)
- Toggenburger Bock (1975)
- Neues aus der Florentiner 73 (1974)
- Bermsers machen Urlaub (1973)
- Florentiner 73 (1972)
