= Robert Chandran =

Indian businessman (1950 – 2008)

- Born: Robert Viswanathan Chandran; 31 May 1950; Mumbai, India
- Died: 7 January 2008 (aged 57); Riau, Indonesia
- Occupation: business executive
- Spouse: Vivian
- Children: 2

Robert Viswanathan Chandran (31 May 1950 – 7 January 2008) was an Indian-born Singaporean business executive, and the founder and CEO of the Chemoil company.

== Early life and education ==
Chandran was born in 1950 in Mumbai, India to a chemist father. Due to financial problems, the family moved to Coimbatore when Chandran was nine.

Chandran unsuccessfully applied to study medicine at the University of Madras but instead undertook a Master's degree in chemistry. Following the death of his mother, Chandran left India in 1972 and lived in the Philippines where he attended the Asian Institute of Management and earned his MBA. In 1976, Chandran emigrated to the United States with his Filipino-American wife Vivian.

== Career ==
Chandran first made his fortune in California, investing in real estate in the San Francisco Bay Area. In 1981, he was naturalized as a U.S. citizen, and in the same year, he founded Chemoil, a chemical and oil trading company specializing in ship-fueling.

By 1991, Chemoil was listed by Forbes as one of the United States' largest private companies, although a blow to the company's fortunes following a global downturn in shipping after the Exxon Valdez disaster forced a major restructure and refinancing. In 2005, Chandran moved himself and the company to a base in Singapore to more easily capitalize on the Asian shipping market.

== Personal life ==
Chandran was married to Vivian and had two children.

Chandran moved his family to Singapore after watching a Singapore National Day Rally on television. He relinquished his U.S. citizenship and became a Singaporean in 2005.

Chandran died on 7 January 2008 from injuries sustained when the helicopter in which he was travelling crashed in the Riau province of Indonesia. News of his death caused Chemoil's share price to drop by around 16 per cent.
