= Mark Pope (counselor) =

American counselor (1952–2023)

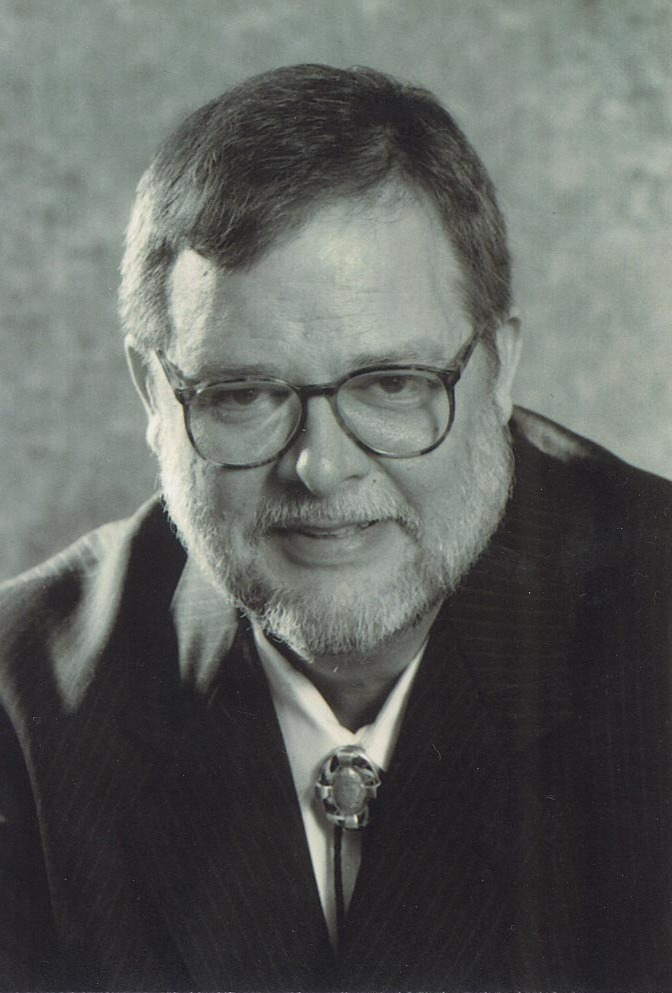
- Mark Pope in 2023
- Born: Mark Raven Speaks Pope; April 23, 1952; Fisk, Missouri, United States
- Died: January 29, 2023 (age 70); Missouri, United States
- Citizenship: Citizen of the United States
- Education: University of Missouri-Columbia (AB, MEd); University of San Francisco (EdD)
- Occupations: Career counselor, professor
- Awards: NCDA, ACA, ALGBTIC

Mark Pope (April 23, 1952 – January 29, 2023) was an American counselor and academic. He advocated for multiculturalism and innovation in counseling, particularly for minorities and the gay and lesbian community.

He was the Thomas Jefferson Professor and Curators' Distinguished Professor Emeritus at the University of Missouri at Saint Louis from 1997 to 2018, where he was a colleague of social theorist Robert Rocco Cottone.

Pope served as chair of the Department of Counseling and Family Therapy at the university from 2006 to 2016. His work and publications focused on cultural diversity in career counseling and development, including LGBTQ career development.

== Early life and education ==
Pope was raised in Fisk, Missouri. He studied at the University of Missouri, Columbia, earning an A.B. in political science and sociology in 1973, and an M.Ed. in counseling and personnel services in 1974. He later obtained his Ed.D. in counseling and educational psychology from the University of San Francisco in 1989.

== Later life and Native American claims ==
Pope was a founding member of the Sovereign Amonsoquth Tribe, which is not federally recognized. On April 7, 2002, in Eastwood, Chief Walking Bear swore in Pope as a Southeastern District Cherokee Tribal Judge on the Amonsoquath Reservation. His brother Isom Pope was present at this reservation formation meeting as a shaman. Mark and Isom Pope founded the St. Francis River Band of the Cherokee in the Fisk and Poplar Bluff area of Missouri, where they were from. In August 2006, Pope resigned as the Iberia chief of police after being cited for possession of a small amount of marijuana and rolling papers.

== Counselor training and writing career ==
His early activities included founding his high school student council. He founded the Missouri Student Lobby (now known as the Associated Students of the University of Missouri), which was reportedly the third student lobby in the United States. He also established a gay and lesbian peer counseling program, reportedly the first in the United States, as part of the Beckman House LGBT community center in Chicago.

Before moving into academia, he had a career counseling and consulting firm in San Francisco for 15 years.

During his doctoral studies, he founded the Graduate Student Council at the University of San Francisco and served as its first president. He also founded Career Decisions International, which was described as the first multicultural career counseling agency in the US. He established the counseling services section of the American Indian AIDS Institute/Native American AIDS Project in San Francisco. He was elected as the first openly gay president of the American Counseling Association and founded the Professional Counseling Fund, which was the first federal political action committee for professional counselors.

== Death ==
Pope died on January 29, 2023, at his home in Missouri.

== Awards ==
Pope received numerous awards in the mental health professions, including human rights awards from the American Counseling Association and the state professional counseling associations of California and Missouri. He received the Eminent Career Award from the National Career Development Association in 2008.

In 2018, the Association for Lesbian, Gay, Bisexual, and Transgender Issues in Counseling (ALGBTIC) established the ALGBTIC Mark Pope Social Justice and Advocacy Award in recognition of his contributions to social justice and advocacy for the LGBT community.

The same year, the University of Missouri System awarded him The Thomas Jefferson Award. In 2015, he was appointed Curators' Distinguished Professor at the University of Missouri–St. Louis. Upon his retirement in 2018, he was designated Curators' Distinguished Professor Emeritus.

In 2004, Pope was included in the OUT 100 list for his contributions to LGBT culture. He was the first openly gay president of a major mental health professional association, the American Counseling Association. This occurred 30 years after the American Psychiatric Association removed "homosexuality" from the DSM (Diagnostic and Statistical Manual of Mental Disorders, published by the American Psychiatric Association).

In 2012, Pope was named NOGLSTP LGBTQ+ Educator of the Year.

== Books ==
- Pope, M., Gonzalez, M., Cameron, E. R. N., & Pangelinan, J. S. (Eds.) (2020). Social justice and advocacy in counseling: Experiential activities for teaching. New York: Routledge/Taylor & Francis.
- Pope, M., Flores, L. Y., & Rottinghaus, P. J. (eds.) (2014). The role of values in careers. Greensboro, NC: Information Age Publishing.
- Niles, S., Goodman, J., & Pope, M. (eds.) (2014). The career counseling casebook: A resource for students, practitioners, and counselor educators (2nd ed.). Tulsa, OK: National Career Development Association. (266 pp.)
- Dworkin, S. H., & Pope, M. (eds.) (2012). Casebook for counseling lesbian, gay, bisexual, and transgender persons and their families. Alexandria, VA: American Counseling Association. (368 pp.)
- Pope, M., & Minor, C. W. (eds.) (2011). Experiential activities for teaching career counseling classes and facilitating career groups (vol. 3). Broken Arrow, OK: National Career Development Association. (350 pp.)
- Pope, M., Pangelinan, J. S., & Coker, A. D. (eds.). (2011). Experiential activities for teaching multicultural competence in counseling. Alexandria, VA: American Counseling Association. (342 pp.)
- Singaravelu, H., & Pope, M. (eds.) (2007). Handbook for counseling international students in the United States. Alexandria, VA: American Counseling Association. (329 pp.)
- Pope, M. (2006). Professional counseling 101: Building a strong professional identity. Alexandria, VA: American Counseling Association. (78 pp.)
- Minor, C. W., & Pope, M. (eds.) (2005). Experiential activities for teaching career counseling classes and facilitating career groups (vol. 2). Tulsa, OK: National Career Development Association. (320 pp.)
- Niles, S., Goodman, J., & Pope, M. (eds.) (2002). The career counseling casebook: A resource for students, practitioners, and counselor educators. Tulsa, OK: National Career Development Association. (266 pp.)
- Pope, M., & Minor, C. W. (eds.) (2000). Experiential activities for teaching career counseling classes and facilitating career groups (vol. 1). Columbus, OH: National Career Development Association.
