= Kathleen E. Fick =

US Air Force general

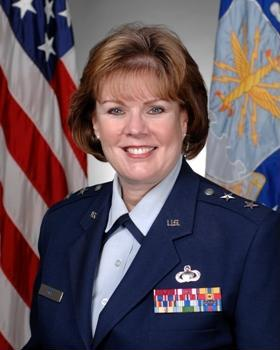
Maj. Gen. Kathleen E. Fick

Kathleen Dodson Fick is a retired United States Air Force major general.

== Career ==
Kathleen Dodson Fick joined the United States Air Force in October 1976 and was initially assigned to Lackland AFB as a BMTS training officer. From 1978-1980, she was stationed at Spangdahlem AB in West Germany as the HQ Squadron Section Commander and the DoD Schools Officer. She was then assigned to the 4th Tactical Fighter Wing at Seymour-Johnson AFB NC where she initially served as the 4th Civil Engineering Squadron Section Commander and then moved on to become the 4th TFW Headquarters Squadron Section Commander. In 1981, Dodson Fick transferred to the Missouri Air National Guard where she was assigned to the 131st Tactical Fighter Wing as an intelligence officer.

In 1995, Dodson Fick transferred to the Pentagon where she served as the Air National Guard Advisor to the USAF Assistant Chief of Staff for Intelligence, as well as the ANG Intelligence Functional Area Manager and Program Element Manager. She subsequently served at the National Guard Bureau as the Director of Space and Information Superiority, where she provided management and oversight of all Space, ISR, Information Operations, and Command and Control assets within the Air National Guard.

After her promotion to brigadier general, Dodson Fick became the Chief of Staff of the Virginia Air National Guard. After serving as the Assistant Adjutant General for Air for the Virginia National Guard, she transferred in 2007 to the same position in the Hawaii National Guard. Later that year, she was selected and served for the remainder of her military career as the Director of Intelligence at the National Guard Bureau. Earning an active duty Air Force retirement, Dodson Fick retired in 2010 and now resides in Charlotte NC.

Awards she received during her career include the Legion of Merit, the Meritorious Service Medal, the Air Force Commendation Medal, the Air Force Outstanding Unit Award, the Organizational Excellence Award, the National Defense Service Medal, the Global War on Terrorism Service Medal, the Air Force Overseas Long Tour Service Ribbon, the Air Force Longevity Service Award, the Armed Forces Reserve Medal and the Air Force Training Ribbon.

== Education ==
- Washburn University BEd
- University of Missouri-St. Louis MEd
- National Intelligence University Master’s in Strategic Intelligence
- Air War College
- Industrial College of the Armed Forces - National Defense University Master’s in Strategic Resources
