= H. Bradford Westerfield =

Professor of political science (1928–2008)

- Born: Holt Bradford Westerfield; March 7, 1928; Rome, Italy
- Died: January 19, 2008 (aged 79); Watch Hill, Rhode Island, U.S.
- Education: Choate Rosemary Hall; Yale University; Harvard University
- Scientific career
- Fields: Political Science
- Workplaces: Yale University

Holt Bradford Westerfield (March 7, 1928 – January 19, 2008) was a Damon Wells Professor of International Studies and professor of political science at Yale University.

== Biography ==
He was educated at The Choate School (now Choate Rosemary Hall), Yale, where he was president of the Yale Political Union, and Harvard, where he earned his graduate degrees and taught from 1952 to 1956. After a year at the University of Chicago he joined the Yale faculty in 1957, and remained there for 40 years. Westerfield was a legendary teacher at Yale, where one of his popular courses was nicknamed by students "Lies and Spies". In 1993 he received the inaugural Byrnes-Sewall Award for undergraduate teaching, and in 2003 he received the Phi Beta Kappa Devane Medal. Among his students were George W. Bush, Dick Cheney, and several future senators.

In 1953, as one of the first in Congressional Fellowship Program of the American Political Science Association (APSA), Westerfield worked in the office of Congressman Lawrence Brooks Hays (D-Arkansas) of the House Foreign Affairs Committee.

In 1970, Westerfield was elected as chair of the Political Science Department. At this point in his development, he was a self-styled "hawk" in terms of the ongoing Vietnam War; but he considered himself a moderate consensus builder in matters relating to the Yale faculty and his own department. Westerfield considered Yale a comparatively quiet place compared with the tensions which were wrenching apart other faculties in the leading American universities of that period; and his strategy for building consensus encompassed an emphasis on scholarship, academic competition, and professional prestige of the department.

He died in 2008.

== Influential teacher ==
Westerfield was credited by Vice President Dick Cheney with having helped shape Cheney's views on foreign policy during Cheney's days at Yale. Cheney's political views were informed by a course he took from Westerfield, then a self-described ardent hawk who believed the United States should be assertive in its role as the leader of the free world. However, Westerfield's views were modified over the course of time, and he came to characterize the Bush administration's foreign policy as "precisely the wrong approach".

Westerfield's legacy as a teacher was more subtly confirmed in a Yale course description prepared for the Spring 2009 semester. Yale's Political Science department offered a seminar on American foreign policy modeled on Westerfield's graduate course.

== Publications ==
- 1955 – Foreign Policy and Party Politics: Pearl Harbor to Korea. New Haven: Yale University Press.
- 1963 – The Instruments of America’s Foreign Policy, Boston: Crowell Press.
- 1972 – The Poverty of Theory and Other Essays, Princeton.
- 1975 – What Use Are Three Versions of the Pentagon Papers?, American Political Science Review, Vol. 69(2), pp. 685–96.
- 1981 – English Prisons and Local Government, Cambridge: Harvard University Press.
- 1995 – Inside the CIA’s Private World: Declassified Articles from the Agency’s Internal Journal, 1955-92. New Haven: Yale University Press.

== Honors and awards ==
- 1953 – Congressional Fellowship Program of the American Political Science Association (APSA).
- 2003 – William Clyde DeVane Medal, Phi Beta Kappa, Yale University Chapter.
