= Carsten Thomassen (journalist) =

Norwegian journalist

- Born: 15 May 1969; Norway
- Died: 14 January 2008 (aged 38); Kabul, Afghanistan
- Occupations: Journalist, political commentator and war correspondent
- Agent: Dagbladet
- Notable credit(s): Covered the 2004 Indian Ocean earthquake and Norwegian politicians
- Children: Two

Carsten Thomassen (15 May 1969 – 14 January 2008) was a Norwegian journalist, political commentator and war correspondent for the Norwegian daily newspaper Dagbladet. He had earlier covered the 2004 Indian Ocean earthquake from Thailand and Indonesia. He was killed in the 2008 Kabul Serena Hotel attack in Kabul, Afghanistan.

== Circumstances of his death ==
On 14 January 2008, Thomassen was covering Norwegian Foreign Minister Jonas Gahr Støre's visit to Kabul. Støre and his entourage were staying in the Serena Hotel, as were several foreign reporters and diplomats. While Thomassen was waiting to meet Støre in the lobby, at least two Talibani militants forced their way into the Serena Hotel by killing the guards posted outside the main entrance using hand grenades. At least one of the militants was dressed in an Afghan police uniform, which may have delayed the reaction of the PST bodyguards inside the hotel.

Thomassen was wounded in the arm, leg and stomach. Once the firing died down, he received first aid from VG photographer Harald Henden, Aftenposten reporter Tor Arne Andreassen, and other unnamed reporters from Verdens Gang and TV2. In the confusion following the attack, he was not evacuated until almost two hours after the attack. He went into shock in the ambulance, and died shortly after while undergoing surgery at a nearby field hospital operated by Czech ISAF forces. Due to the nature of his injuries, it is doubtful that he would have survived even if he had been evacuated earlier.

At least six other people were killed in the attack, in addition to the militants themselves.

=== Reaction in Norway and abroad ===
In the wake of the attack, Støre's visit was cut short, and all remaining Norwegian reporters were evacuated, first to the Norwegian encampment outside Kabul, and later back to Norway by military transport.

Many Norwegians, and particularly members of the press, reacted to the news of Thomassen's death with great sorrow. Dagbladet set up a web page to allow members of the public to express their condolences. As of 16 January 2008, more than 4,500 personal messages had been submitted.

Prime Minister Jens Stoltenberg knew Thomassen personally, and was informed of his death while on his way to a previously planned television debate on Norway's involvement in Afghanistan. He withdrew from the debate and immediately issued a statement, calling the militants act an attack not only against Norway but also against freedom of speech. The next day, he devoted the first fifteen minutes of a previously planned lecture on environmental issues at Oslo Katedralskole (of which both Thomassen and Stoltenberg were alumni, though ten years apart) to the death of his friend. Foreign Minister Støre commented on the death of Thomassen, saying: "Carsten was unique among Norwegian journalists. He combined solid journalistic work with integrity and great knowledge. He has followed me on many journeys and he was until the end dedicated to his work as a journalist."

The International Press Institute strongly condemned the attack. According to the IPI's Death Watch, Thomassen was the second journalist to be killed in action in 2008.

=== Controversy in Norway ===
Thomassen's death triggered controversy in Norway when it became known that the Ministry of Foreign Affairs had ignored recommendations from PST and Norwegian military intelligence regarding the security arrangements for Støre's visit. One particularly controversial decision, which may have contributed to the Taliban's choice of target, was to publish Støre's itinerary, including the name of the hotel where he would be staying, in advance of the trip. Furthermore, while it is standard operating procedure for the Norwegian ISAF forces to escort any Norwegian delegation in Afghanistan with a protection detail including a medevac APC, the Foreign Ministry had declined such an escort. Subsequent to the attack, sources within the Norwegian armed forces expressed dismay at the Norwegian Foreign Ministry's lack of proper contingency plans for medical evacuation.

== Posthumous honours ==
In October 2008, during his first visit to Afghanistan following the Serene attack, Foreign Minister Støre attended a ceremony at the Norwegian embassy where the Afghan education minister Mohammad Hanif Atmar unveiled the drawings for the Carsten Thomassen Library at the National Institute for Administration and Management, an elite institution to train future Afghan leaders, which will be built chiefly with the help of Norwegian funding. The Afghan minister said that Thomassen was a great journalist, and the Norwegian minister emphasized that naming the library in this way was a tribute to critical journalism and to education.

== See also ==
- List of journalists killed during the War in Afghanistan (2001–2021)
