= Smash and Grab (biology) =

Smash and Grab is the name given to a technique developed by Charles S. Hoffman and Fred Winston used in molecular biology to rescue plasmids from yeast transformants into Escherichia coli, also known as E. coli, in order to amplify and purify them. In addition, it can be used to prepare yeast genomic DNA (and DNA from tissue samples) for Southern blot analyses or polymerase chain reaction (PCR).
