= Marty Hendin =

- Born: March 16, 1948; St. Louis, Missouri
- Died: January 12, 2008 (aged 59); St. Louis, Missouri
- Education: University of Missouri-St. Louis
- Spouse: Ronna
- Children: Rob
- Parent(s): Sholom and Pearl Hendin

Marty Hendin (March 16, 1948 – January 12, 2008) was a baseball executive who worked in various marketing, public relations, and community relations posts for the St. Louis Cardinals of Major League Baseball. Inducted into the University of Missouri-St. Louis Sports Hall of Fame in 2003, Hendin began his career with the Cardinals in 1973.

== Early years ==
Hendin was born to his parents Pearl and Sholom on March 16, 1948. After graduating from University City High School in 1966, Hendin moved on to attend the University of Missouri-St. Louis. Hendin was the first sportswriter on staff of the UMSL student newspaper The Current, later rising to become the sports editor. He also made his mark at UMSL by founding the university's first spirit club, known as "The Steamers".

Known for an innovative focus on capturing the attention of younger baseball fans, Hendin is credited with helping spur the popularity of team mascot Fredbird. Commenting on the creation of Fredbird, Hendin said,

Everyone wants to credit me with inventing him, and I didn't. He was sort of put under my wing, so to speak ... Basically, the idea had been broached by many different people, since that was the heyday of the San Diego Chicken.

—Marty Hendin

Hendin also gained notarity for a unique collection of Cardinal and baseball memorabilia in his office at Busch Memorial Stadium that was dubbed "Trinket City." A portion of Hendin's extensive 33 year memorabilia collection is currently on display in the UMSL Student Center. The other portion is on display inside of the new Busch Stadium and can be seen during a stadium tour.

== Death ==
He died from cancer, aged 59, in 2008.

== Honors ==
Hendin was inducted into the University of Missouri-St. Louis Sports Hall of Fame in 2003 under the category of distinguished service for his, "work and dedication to the UMSL Athletic Department." Hendin was inducted into the St. Louis Jewish Sports Hall of Fame in 2010.
