= Blindenmarkt =

- Municipality
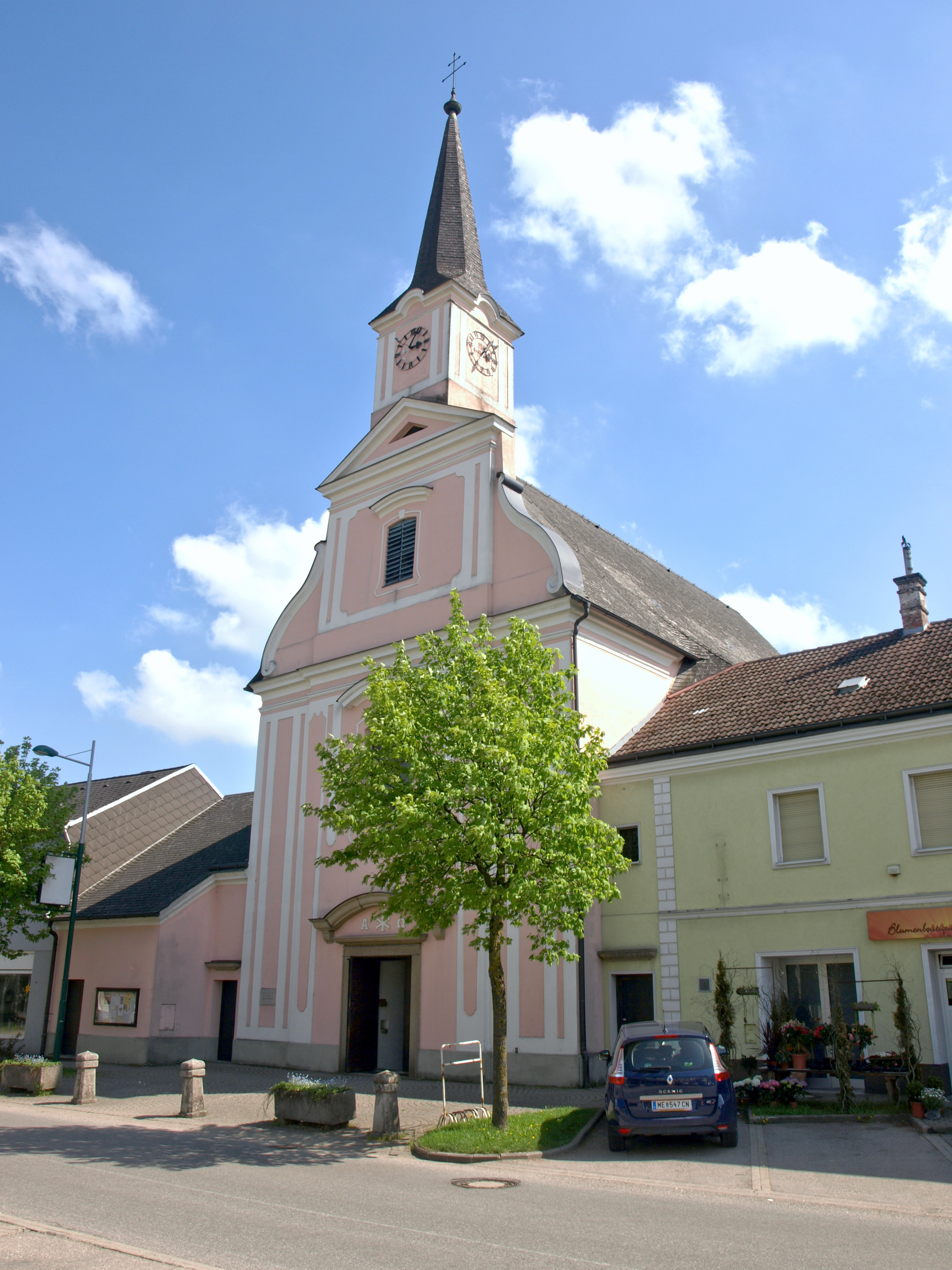
- Blindenmarkt parish church

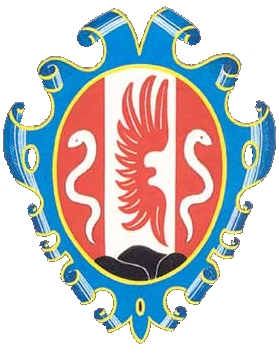
- Coat of arms

- Location within Austria
- Coordinates: 48°8′N 14°59′E
- Country: Austria
- State: Lower Austria
- District: Melk

Government
  - Mayor: Franz Wurzer

Area
  - Total: 17.05 km^{2} (6.58 sq mi)
- Elevation: 246 m (807 ft)

Population (2018-01-01)
  - Total: 2,712
  - Density: 159.1/km^{2} (412.0/sq mi)
- Time zone: UTC+1 (CET)
  - Summer (DST): UTC+2 (CEST)
- Postal code: 3372
- Area code: 07473
- Website: https://blindenmarkt.gv.at/

Blindenmarkt is a town in the district of Melk in the Austrian state of Lower Austria.

== Geography ==
Blindenmarkt lies in the valley of the Ybbs River 8 km east of Amstetten in the Mostviertel in Lower Austria.
