= Arafan Camara =

Guinean politician (1948–2008)

General Arafan Camara (2 January 1948 – 6 January 2008) was a politician and military official in Guinea. Camara was named defense minister on 28 March 2007 after mass protests forced a new government. He was dismissed as minister on 12 May 2007 after soldiers rioted concerning better working conditions and the re-instatement of sacked military leaders. He was replaced by retired Army General Bailo Diallo. He died on 6 January 2008, 4 days after his 60th birthday.

== Sources ==
- "Guinea's defence minister sacked" BBC News, 11 May 2007
- U.S. State Department profile of Guinea (4/07)
- Obituary
