= Valentim Amões =

Angolan politician and businessman

- Born: 11 September 1959
- Died: 19 January 2008 (aged 48)

Valentim Amões (4 July 1960 – 19 January 2008) was an Angolan politician and businessman.

Born in the village of Camela (now known as Camela Amões Village) in the Huambo Province, he was a member of the Central Committee of the People's Movement for the Liberation of Angola (MPLA), having defected from UNITA.

He was killed along with 12 other people on 19 January 2008, when a B-200 aircraft headed for Huambo City struck the Serra Mbave mountains in the Huambo Province. Angolan President José Eduardo dos Santos said that he "was a dynamic, courageous and perspicacious businessman". He was 47 on the day of the tragedy.
