= Guy Hance =

Belgian politician

- Born: 30 September 1933
- Died: 8 January 2008 (aged 74); Brussels, Belgium
- Occupation: politician

Guy Hance (1933 – 8 January 2008) was a deputy of Front National at the Parliament of Brussels from 1999 to 2004, and from October 2006 to January 2008. He died on 8 January 2008 in Brussels at age 74.

== Sources ==
- Obituary (in French)
