= Roland Selmeczi =

Hungarian actor

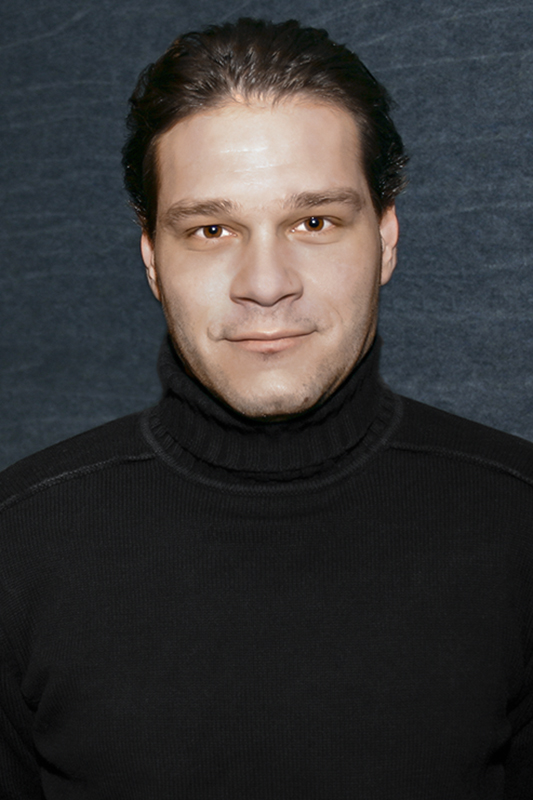
Selmeczi Roland.

Roland Selmeczi (2 October 1969 – 30 January 2008) was a Hungarian actor. He played in theatre plays, in movies and television series, and provided dub in many television series like House M.D. (Dr. James Wilson), 24 (Jack Bauer), Sliders (Quinn Mallory) and Desperate Housewives (Mike Delfino). He also was known to dub Brad Pitt and Antonio Banderas several times.

He died in a car accident on 30 January 2008. He was 38 years old.
