= Mudaliarkuppam Boat House =

Building in India

Coordinates: 12.352128°N 80.062163°E

Mudaliarkuppam Boat House (Tamil: முதலியார்குப்பம் படகுக் குழாம்), also known as Raindrop Boat House, is a water sport facility located on the East Coast Road, 36 km to the south of Mamallapuram and 92 km from Chennai in India. It was developed by the Tamil Nadu Tourism Development Corporation on the Odiyur lake back waters. It has rowing, cruising, speed boating, water scooting and kayaking facilities.

In 2007, Mudhaliarkuppam Boat House became the first of the eight boat houses of Tamil Nadu Tourism Development Corporation to offer water scooters. The boat house organises motor boat trips to the beach island located in the Odiyur lake.

Mudaliarkuppam is located in the district of Kanchipuram, 92 km from Chennai and 36 km down Mamallapuram on ECR (East Coast Road).

== Fauna ==
Mudaliarkuppam is a birding area where one can see white-bellied sea eagle, osprey, Indian skimmer, slender-billed gull, brahminy kite, brown-headed gull, painted stork and stone curlew. There are also jackal, Indian hare, Bengal monitor, sea fans, turtles and Russell's viper.

== Mudaliarkuppam backwaters ==
Mudaliarkuppam backwaters is a brackish water lagoon adjacent to the Bay of Bengal on the East Coast Road. This is yet another haven for wading birds and migratory ducks.

The habitat consists of coastal water mudflats, sand banks and salt pans.

Highlights: Hundreds of greater flamingos can be spotted here throughout the year. Thousands of migratory ducks, terns and waders can also be spotted during winter months.

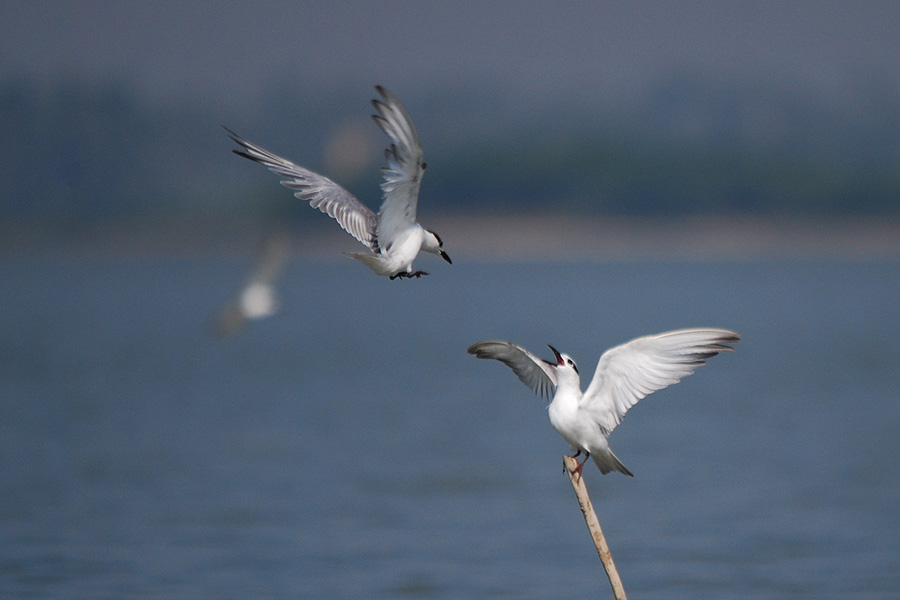
Gull-billed terns at Mudaliarkuppam

The resident birds seen here include little cormorant, spot-billed pelican, little grebe, common kingfisher, pied kingfisher, white-breasted kingfisher, little green or striated heron, pond heron and red-wattled lapwing.

Some of the winter migrants seen here are greater flamingo, Kentish plover, lesser sand plover, Pacific golden plover, grey plover, common sandpiper, curlew sandpiper, Eurasian curlew, osprey, little stint, Temminck's stint, black-tailed godwit, common redshank, greenshank, common tern, little tern, whiskered tern, gull-billed tern, Caspian tern, brown-headed gull, Pallas's gull, slender-billed gull, painted stork, openbill stork and grey heron. Thousands of Eurasian wigeon, northern pintail, and northern shoveller also use the backwaters.

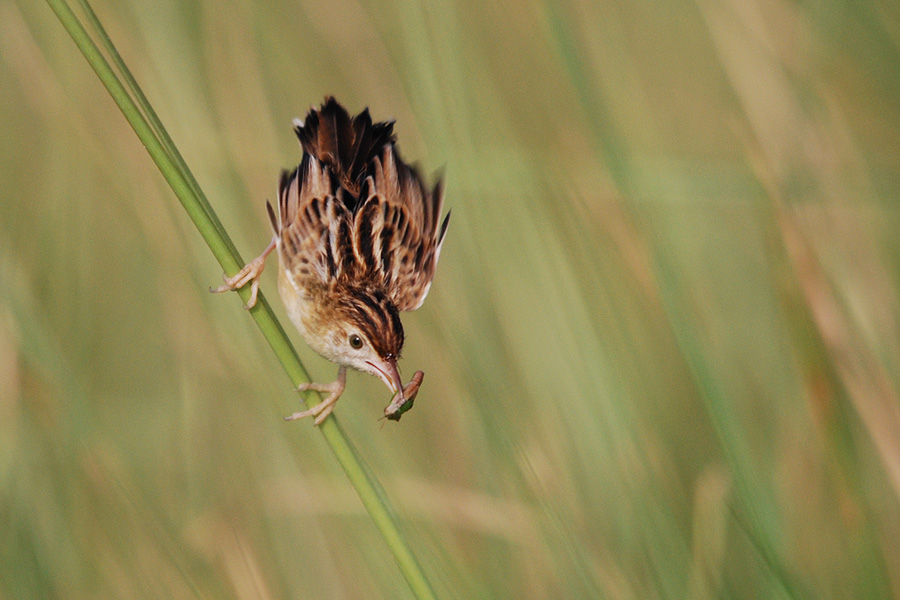
Zitting cisticola at muduliyarkuppam scrub

== See also ==
- Muttukadu boat house
