= Muttukadu boat house =

Water sport facility in Chennai, India

Muttukadu Boat House
- முட்டுக்காடுப் படகுக் குழாம்
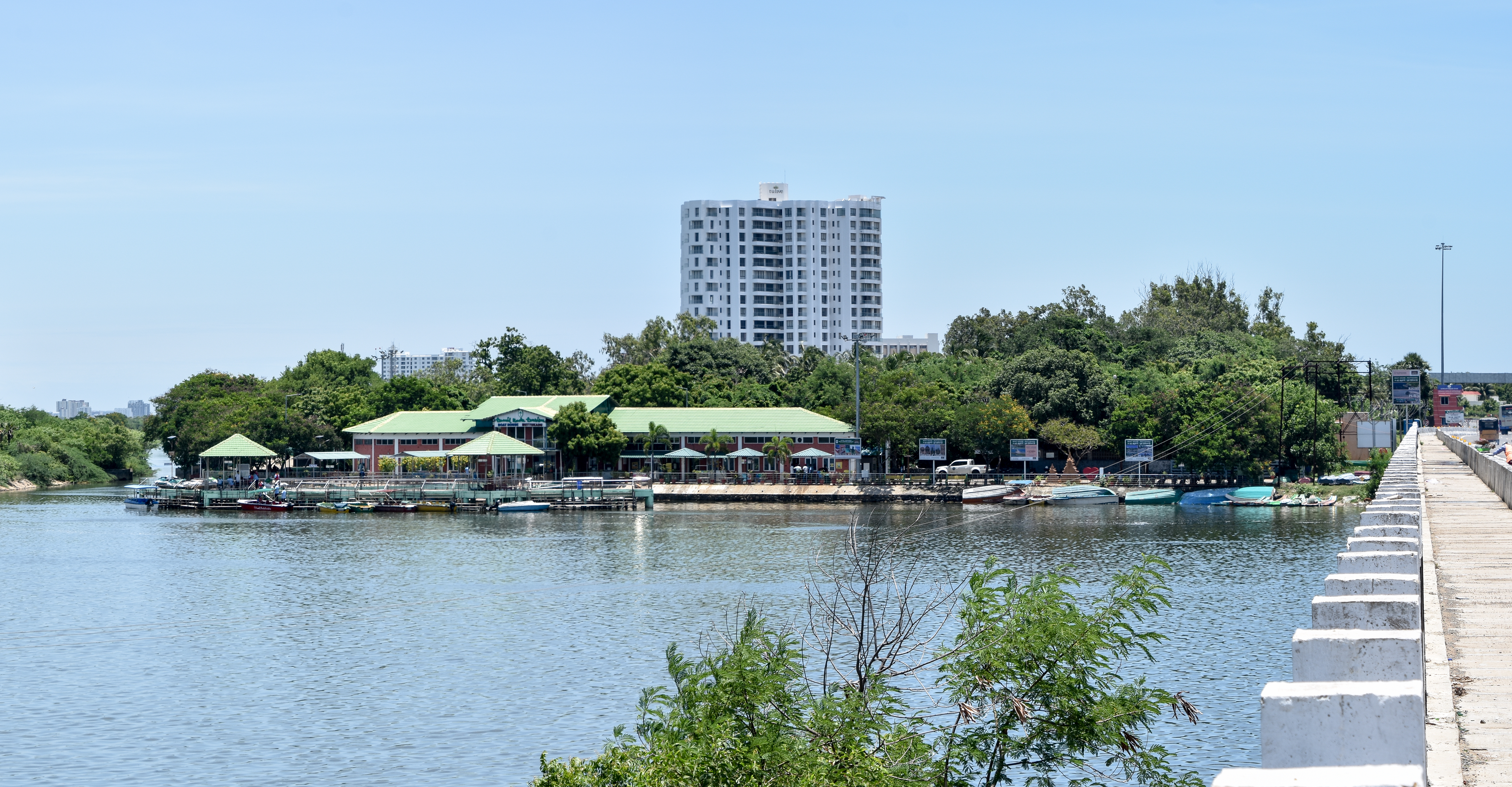
- The Boat house as seen from the ECR bridge

General information
- Location: Muttukadu, Kanchipuram district, Greater Chennai, India
- Coordinates: 12.8058°N 80.2420°E
- Grid position: 12°48'20.91"N, 80°14'30.91"E
- Elevation: 5 m (16 ft)
- Inaugurated: 1984
- Renovated: Jun 2009
- Owner: Tamil Nadu Tourism Development Corporation

Website
- www.tamilnadutourism.org/boathouse/Muttukadu.html

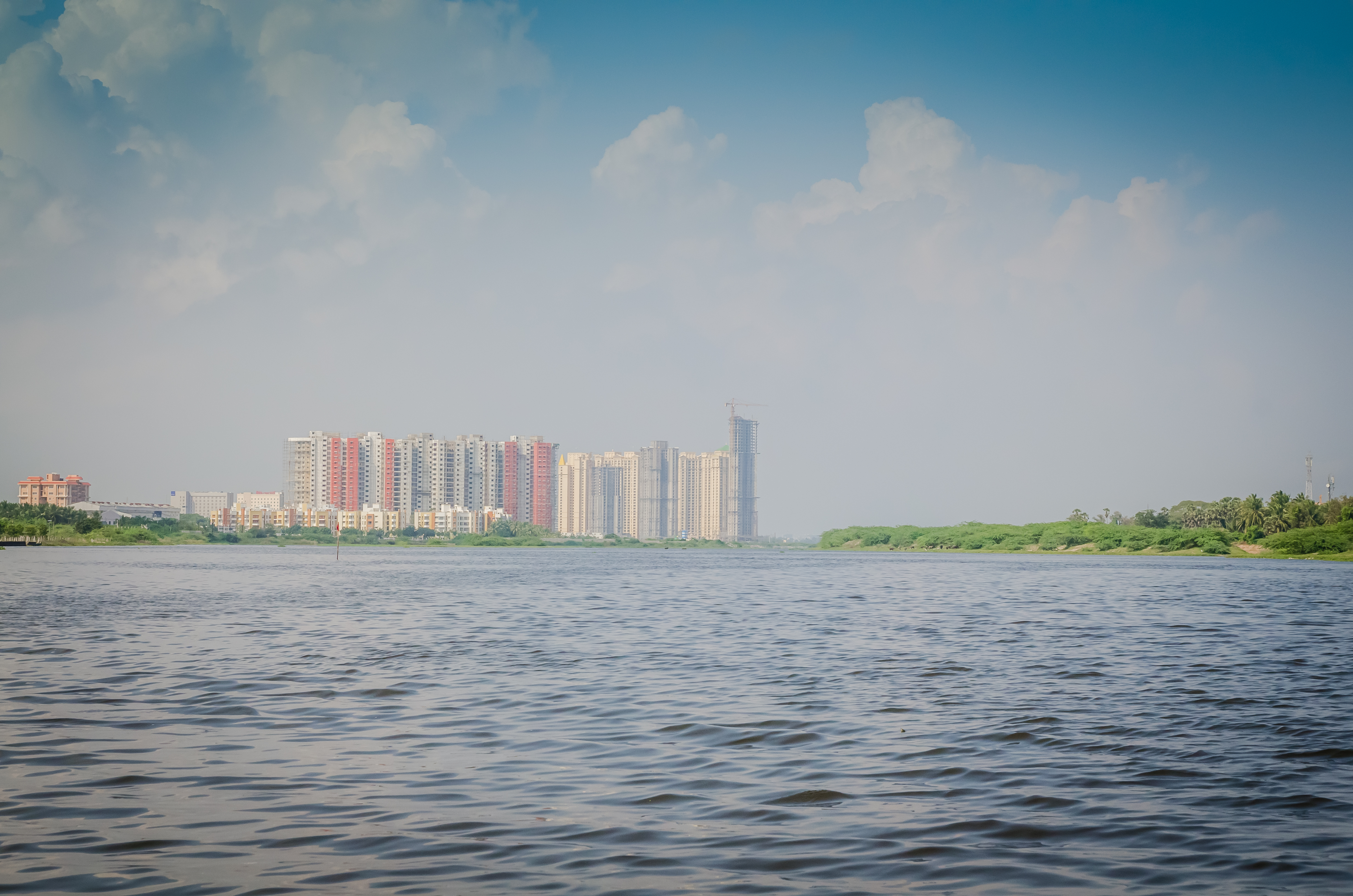
OMR Skyline as seen from Muttukadu backwaters

Muttukadu Boat House (Tamil: முட்டுக்காடு படகுக் குழாம்) is a water sport facility on the East Coast Road at Muttukadu village in Kanchipuram district of Tamil Nadu and comes under Chennai Metropolitan Area. It is a coastal suburb located in Chennai City. It offers rowing, wind surfing, water skiing, and speedboat riding. It is a backwater area of the Bay of Bengal located 36 km (22 mi) from the city centre and 23 km (14 mi) from Adyar and is on the way to Mamallapuram from Chennai. The boat house was inaugurated in 1984 and has 15 row boats, 27 speedboats and 9 pedal boats, besides two high-speed aqua scooters. The water depth varies between 3 ft and 6 ft. It is owned and operated by the Tamil Nadu Tourism Development Corporation (TTDC). The boating spot receives more than 4,000 visitors every weekend.

In July 2009, TTDC inaugurated a new bamboo boathouse and a floating boat jetty at the Muttukadu boating facility. The boathouse, with a special roof made of bamboo, has a lounge, from where visitors can watch the boats, and a restaurant. The building has been constructed at a cost of ₹ 8.7 million and the floating jetty at a cost of ₹ 1.2 million. A couple of high-speed aqua scooters with a seating capacity of three was also introduced at a cost of ₹ 1.35 million, which has received good patronage. The scooters can sail at an average speed of 120 km/hour.

The boat house has a multi-cuisine restaurant named "Surf", a unit of Coral. In the recent Chennai flood of 2015, Muttukadu boats were used to rescue people on the outskirts of Chennai city.

== Developments ==
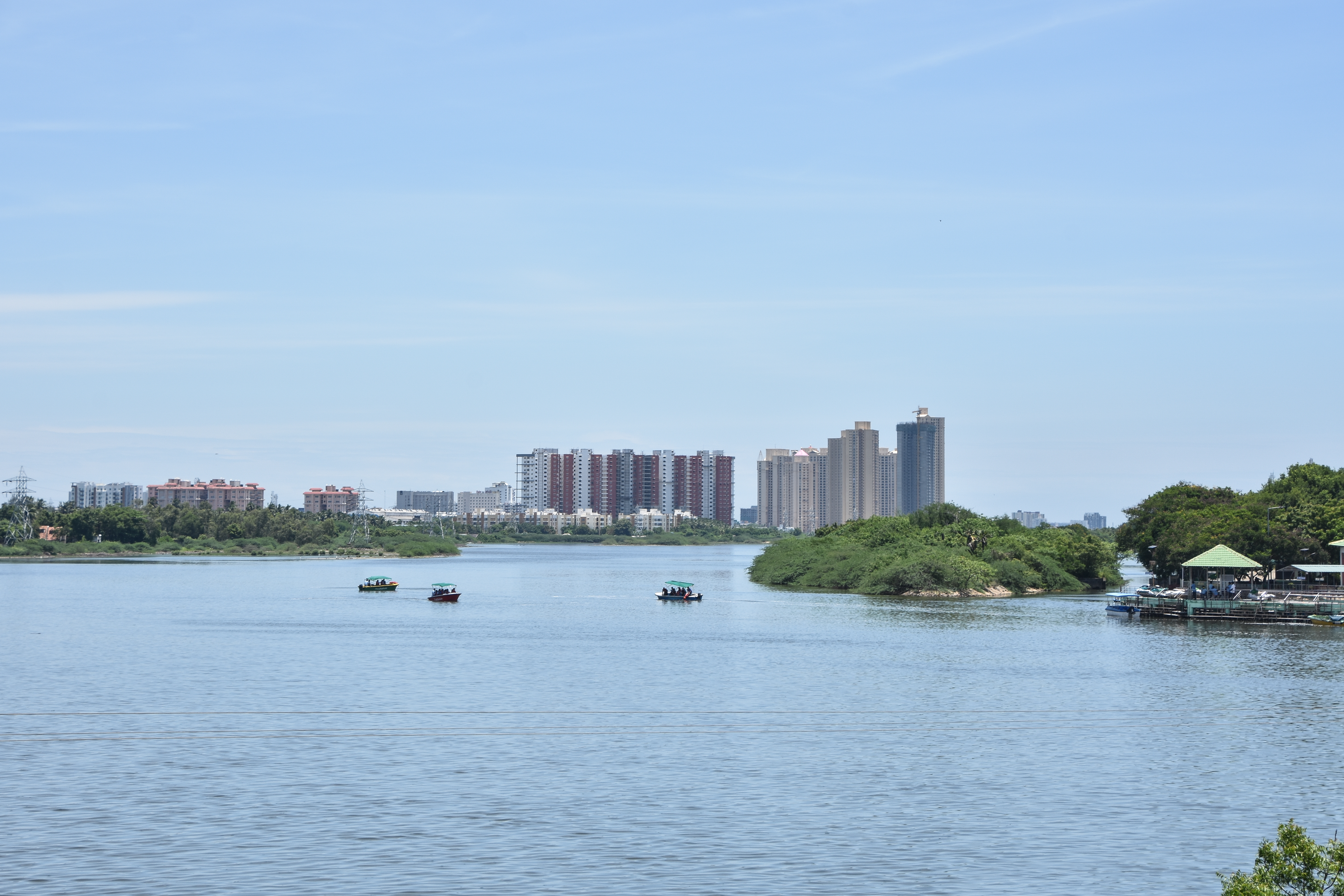
Boating on the backwaters in 2021

The TTDC is planning to introduce sailing near the boating facility as a private-public partnership venture. The Tamil Nadu Tourism Department is also planning to develop the boat house, along with Mudaliarkuppam boat house and Mamallapuram, using funds from Asian Development Bank.

In 2008, the TTDC was in process of upgrading facilities at the boat house at the cost of ₹ 7.4 million. It would include a new floating jetty and extension of the boat house.

== Events ==
In 2008, TTDC conducted a boat race in Muttukadu, in association with the Madras Boat Club.

== See also ==
- Mudaliarkuppam boat house
