= Holst (surname) =

Holst and von Holst are surnames. In Denmark and Norway they are of Medieval origin, meaning Holsatian (person from Holstein). They may refer to:

== Holst ==
- Alison Holst (born 1938), New Zealand food writer and television chef
- Amalia Holst (1758–1829), German writer, intellectual, and feminist
- Arne Holst (1904–1991), Norwegian bobsledder
- Axel Holst (1860–1931), Norwegian professor of hygiene and bacteriology
- Bengt Holst (born 1952), Danish biologist
- Bodil Holst, Danish physicist
- Carl Holst (born 1970), Danish politician
- Christian Holst (born 1981), Danish/Faroese football player
- Dagmar Holst (born 1942), German rower
- Eduard Holst (1843–1899), Danish actor, dancer, playwright, and composer
- Elise Holst (1811–1891), Danish stage actress.
- Erika Holst (born 1979), Swedish ice hockey player
- Ewout Holst (born 1978), Dutch swimmer
- Frederik Holst, multiple people
- Gilda Holst (1952–2024), Ecuadorian writer
- Gilles Holst (1886–1968), Dutch physicist
- Gustav Holst (1874–1934), English composer
- Hanne-Vibeke Holst (born 1959), Danish author
- Hans Faye Holst (1788–1843), Norwegian politician
- Hans Holst, 17th century Danish woodcarver
- Henning Holst (1891–1975), Danish field hockey player
- Imogen Holst (1907–1984), British conductor, composer, and writer, daughter of Gustav Holst
- Jens Juul Holst (born 1945), Danish physician and physiologist
- Johan Jørgen Holst (1937–1994), Norwegian politician
- Johan Throne Holst (1868–1946), Norwegian industrialist and politician
- Kai Holst (1913–1945), Norwegian resistance fighter and member of Milorg
- Knut Holst, Norwegian Nordic skier
- Lars Holst (1848–1915), Norwegian journalist, newspaper editor, and politician
- Mads Kähler Holst (born 1973), Danish archaeologist and museum curator
- Per Holst (1939–2025), Danish film producer and director
- Peter Theodor Holst (1843–1908), Norwegian politician
- Poul Christian Holst (1776–1863), Norwegian government official
- Spencer Holst (1926–2001), American writer and storyteller
- Svea Holst (1901–1996), Swedish film actress
- Theodor von Holst (1810–1844), English painter
- Thomas Holst (born 1964), German serial killer
- Timothy Holst (1947–2009), American ringmaster
- Toke Holst (born 1981), Danish handballer
- Waldemar Holst (1907–1975), German Korvettenkapitän

== von Holst ==
- Erich von Holst (1908–1962), German behavioral physiologist
- Erik von Holst (1894–1962), Estonian/German ice yacht designer and sailor
- Hermann Eduard von Holst (1841–1904), Estonian-German-American historian
- Hermann V. von Holst (1874–1955), American architect
- Johan Hübner von Holst (1881–1945), Swedish sport shooter

== Other ==
- Maria van der Holst-Blijlevens (born 1946), Dutch sprint canoer
- Niels Holst-Sørensen (1922–2023), commander-in-chief of the Danish Air Force and European champion athlete
- Jon Holst-Christensen (born 1968), Danish retired male badminton player
- Joachim Holst-Jensen (1880–1963), Norwegian film actor
- June Holst-Roness (1929–2008), mayor of Freetown, Sierra Leone

== See also ==
- Holst Township, Clearwater County, Minnesota
- Holst's frog
- Holst Singers
- 3590 Holst
