= List of Elinor Wonders Why episodes =

Elinor Wonders Why is an animated television series created by Jorge Cham and Daniel Whiteson. The series premiered on September 7, 2020 from PBS Kids. The series is produced using 2D software.

== Series overview ==
Season	Segments	Episodes	Originally released	
Season	Segments	Episodes	First released	Last released
1	80	40	September 7, 2020	April 21, 2022
2	TBA	TBA	June 3, 2024	TBA

== Episodes ==
=== Season 1 (2020–22) ===
All episodes in this season were directed by Kevin Micallef, with the exception of "The Seed of an Idea", which was co-directed by Joey So.

No. overall	No. in season	Title	Written by	Original release date	Prod. code
1	1	"Hiding In Plain Sight"	Tom Berger	September 7, 2020	102
1	1	"Owl Girl"	Jorge Cham & Daniel Whiteson	September 7, 2020	102
Elinor and her pals are playing Hide and Go-Seek, but they are always spotted by the Goat twins. They observe camouflaged animals, and figure out to stay hidden, they need to camouflage themselves. Elinor can't figure out what to be for Costume Day, and wants to find out why an owl has been sleeping all morning. After exploring at night with her mom, she figures out what she wants to be for Costume Day: an owl. Storytime: Ms. Mole tells a story about octopuses, and how they camouflage themselves.
2	2	"Backyard Soup"	Jorge Cham & Daniel Whiteson	September 7, 2020	113
2	2	"Colorful and Tasty"	Jorge Cham & Daniel Whiteson	September 7, 2020	113
Elinor is visiting her Baba and Bibi in Desert Town, and wants to make Backyard Soup, she can't find the ingredients. She figures out that certain plants grow in certain places. Elinor, Olive, and Ari have made carrot cupcakes, but they aren't selling in the park. Everyone loves cupcakes, they figure out that they need to spread the color, and the smell. Señor Tapir's Song: Señor Tapir sings a song about Ynes Mexia, a plant enthusiast.
3	3	"The Amazing Expandable Clubhouse"	Katherine Sandford	September 8, 2020	101
3	3	"The Town Picnic"	Jorge Cham & Daniel Whiteson	September 8, 2020	101
Elinor, Ari, and Olive have new members for their club, but there's not enough room for everyone in the clubhouse. They look for help from their snail friends, Norma and Lulu. They figure out that they can expand the clubhouse. Animal Town is having its Town Picnic, and Ari is getting impatient for waiting for Ms. Llama's ketchup. They find out that the ketchup is taking a long time to pour out of the bottle due to it being too goopy. They figure out that adding water can make things more runny. Señor Tapir's Song: Señor Tapir sings a song about Jacques Cousteau, the inventor of scuba gear.
4	4	"The Science of Staying Warm"	Miklos Perlus	September 9, 2020	103
4	4	"The Seed of an Idea"	Jorge Cham & Daniel Whiteson	September 9, 2020	103
5	5	"The House That Ants Built"	Adam Ruben	September 10, 2020	104
5	5	"Special Places"	Rachel Lipman	September 10, 2020	104
Elinor, Ari, and Olive want to make a cushion castle, but they all try to make different things and take from each other. They look at an anthill, and discover that the ants are working together. They figure out that they should work together. Ari has lost his new super bouncy ball. He and his friends look around, and they track where Ari has been throughout the whole day. They figure out that to keep something safe, you should put it in a special place. Storytime: Ms. Mole tells a story about ants, and if ants have families.
6	6	"The Tomato Drop"	Karen Moonah	September 14, 2020	105
6	6	"Look What I Can Do"	Dave Dias	September 14, 2020	105
Animal Town is having its Tomato Festival, and Elinor, Ari, and Olive are participating in the Tomato Drop, they can't keep the tomato from smushing. They figure out that they can use something as a chute to keep the tomato from smushing. The kids are learning how to play soccer, but Elinor and Ari aren't as good as the others. Elinor can't kick the ball as far, and Ari keeps catching the ball with his hands. They figure out that everybody has their own special ability. Señor Tapir's Song: Señor Tapir sings a song about Louis-Sébastien Lenormand, the inventor of the parachute.
7	7	"The Lizard Lounge"	Jorge Cham & Daniel Whiteson	September 15, 2020	106
7	7	"Feathers"	Jorge Cham & Daniel Whiteson	September 15, 2020	106
8	8	"Bird Song"	Jorge Cham & Daniel Whiteson	September 16, 2020	107
8	8	"No Need to Shout"	Kate Barris	September 16, 2020	107
9	9	"Ms. Mole's Glasses"	Rachel Lipman	July 13, 2020 (YouTube and PBS Kids Video); September 17, 2020	108
9	9	"Elinor Stops the Squish"	Karen Moonah	July 13, 2020 (YouTube and PBS Kids Video); September 17, 2020	108
10	10	"Speed Racer"	Adam Ruben	September 21, 2020	109
10	10	"One of These Goats"	Kate Barris	September 21, 2020	109
11	11	"Leave It to Ari"	Jorge Cham & Daniel Whiteson	September 22, 2020	111
11	11	"Snow Friend"	Katherine Sandford	September 22, 2020	111
12	12	"Wind in the Web"	Jorge Cham & Daniel Whiteson	September 23, 2020	112
12	12	"The Pokey Plant"	Jorge Cham & Daniel Whiteson	September 23, 2020	112
13	13	"Bubble House"	Katherine Sandford	September 28, 2020	114
13	13	"The Syrup Tree"	Jorge Cham & Daniel Whiteson	September 28, 2020	114
14	14	"The Paper Trail"	Karen Moonah	September 29, 2020	115
14	14	"Bath Time"	Adam Ruben	September 29, 2020	115
15	15	"Make Music Naturally"	Kate Barris	November 2, 2020	116
15	15	"Light the Way"	Tom Berger	November 2, 2020	116
16	16	"These Sneezes"	Dave Dias	November 9, 2020	117
16	16	"Ari's Lucky Shirt"	Michael Foulke	November 9, 2020	117
When trying to carry flowers in the park, Olive suddenly sneezes. They wonder why they sneeze. The figure out that they sneeze to keep irritating things out of your nose. Ari wants to wear his lucky shirt for today's soccer game, but it's too small. He and his friends find out that Ari's growing, and he needs to wear his green shirt. Señor Tapir's Song: Señor Tapir sings a song about Lydia Bourouiba, a scientist who wanted to find how sneezes move.
17	17	"Follow That Roly Poly"	Katherine Sandford	November 16, 2020	118
17	17	"Rain, Rain Don't Go Away"	Rachel Lipman	November 16, 2020	118
18	18	"Water You Doing?"	Kate Barris	November 23, 2020	119
18	18	"Thinking About Blinking"	Paul Moncrieffe	November 23, 2020	119
19	19	"Feed the Birds"	Katherine Sandford	April 21, 2022	110
19	19	"Señor Tapir Says Adios"	Jorge Cham & Daniel Whiteson	April 21, 2022	110
20	20	"Butterfly Babies"	Rosemary Mosco	March 15, 2021	120
20	20	"Elinor's Circus"	Karen Moonah	March 15, 2021	120
While exploring the park, Ari and Olive explain to each other about caterpillars and butterflies. When a butterfly lands on little Miri's nose, it makes Elinor wonder, "what do butterfly babies look like?". They figure out that butterfly babies are actually: caterpillars. Elinor, Ari, and Olive have their own circus. But, neither of them are good at their acts. With the help of Siggy Squirrel, they figure out that what they need is balance. Señor Tapir's Song: Señor Tapir sings a song about Fred and Norah Urquhart, two scientists who wanted to know where butterflies go during migration.
21	21	"Zig Zag Plant"	Jorge Cham & Daniel Whiteson	March 16, 2021	121
21	21	"Butterfly Drinks"	Jorge Cham & Daniel Whiteson	March 16, 2021	121
22	22	"Frozen Fish"	Adam Ruben	March 17, 2021	122
22	22	"Pirate Treasure"	Tom Berger	March 17, 2021	122
23	23	"Burrowing Owl Girl"	Katherine Sandford	March 18, 2021	123
23	23	"Olive's Tree"	Michael Foulke	March 18, 2021	123
Elinor is spending the day with her Bibi, and she fins an owl that doesn't act like a normal owl. She and Bibi notices that things look different, but they're still the same thing. She figures out that it was a burrowing owl she saw, and that she doesn't know everything about owls. Olive loves her special tree in the park. When it falls down, she is really sad. She and her friends figure out that the tree will still have a role in the park as a wildlife tree. Señor Tapir's Song: Señor Tapir sings a song about Roseli Ocampo, an explorer who wanted to know if life lived everywhere.
24	24	"Speedy Swimming"	Katherine Sandford	June 7, 2021	124
24	24	"Strawberry Jam"	Rosemary Mosco	June 7, 2021	124
25	25	"To Bee or Not to Bee"	Michael Foulke	June 8, 2021	125
25	25	"Turtle Crossing"	Michael Foulke	June 8, 2021	125
26	26	"Big Trees"	Jorge Chem & Daniel Whiteson	June 9, 2021	126
26	26	"Baby Steps"	Katherine Sandford	June 9, 2021	126
27	27	"Follow Your Nose"	Jorge Cham & Daniel Whiteson	June 10, 2021	127
27	27	"Leaf Charms"	Jorge Cham & Daniel Whiteson	June 10, 2021	127
28	28	"A Change of Art"	Adam Ruben	September 6, 2021	128
28	28	"Litterbug"	Michael Foulke	September 6, 2021	128
Elinor, Olive, and Ari are at art class with Mr. Lion, but they're out of paint. They find that grass and berries can make paint-like items. They figure out that you can use things from nature to make art. There's litter in the park, and the kids want to help Mrs. Hippo get rid of the litter. But, there's even more around the town. Elinor figures out that the cause of the litter is her, Olive, Ari, and Mrs. Hippo. Señor Tapir's Song: Señor Tapir sings a song about Sada Mire, a Swedish-Somali archaeologist, and public intellectual known for her work on the archaeology and heritage of the Horn of Africa.
29	29	"The Unsinkable Lynx"	Rosemary Mosco	September 7, 2021	129
29	29	"Rocky the Rock"	Katherine Sandford	September 7, 2021	129
30	30	"Echo Location"	Jorge Chem & Daniel Whiteson	September 8, 2021	130
30	30	"Ears to You"	Tom Berger	September 8, 2021	130
31	31	"Olive's Library"	Jorge Cham & Daniel Whiteson	September 9, 2021	131
31	31	"Nature Walk"	Katherine Sandford	September 9, 2021	131
32	32	"Butterfly Party"	Katherine Sandford	January 17, 2022	132
32	32	"More Than One Right Way"	Kate Barris	January 17, 2022	132
33	33	"Underground Soup"	Katherine Sandford	January 18, 2022	133
33	33	"Dandy Dandelions"	Karen Moonah	January 18, 2022	133
34	34	"A Moth Mystery"	Katherine Sandford	January 19, 2022	134
34	34	"Just Peachy"	Tom Berger	January 19, 2022	134
35	35	"A Garden for All"	Michael Foulke	January 20, 2022	135
35	35	"Band of Explorers"	Karen Moonah	January 20, 2022	135
36	36	"The Little Drummer"	Laura Sams & Robert Sams	April 19, 2022	136
36	36	"Rest is Best"	Rosemary Mosco	April 19, 2022	136
37	37	"Elinor's Fishy Friend"	Katherine Sandford	April 20, 2022	137
37	37	"Do the Crane Dance"	Jorge Cham	April 20, 2022	137
38–40	38–40	"A Wonderful Journey"	Jorge Cham, Daniel Whiteson & Katherine Sandford	April 18, 2022	138–140

=== Season 2 (2024–26) ===
Delia Lisette Chambers replaces Maria Nash in the role of Olive and Athan Giazitzidis replaces Wyatt White in the role of Ari.

All episodes in this season were directed by Wesley Bryant.

No. overall	No. in season	Title	Written by	Original release date	Prod. code
41	1	"The Violin Lesson"	Jorge Cham	June 3, 2024	201
41	1	"Flying High"	Jorge Cham	June 3, 2024	201
Elinor and Ari go to Olive's house for a sleepover, when they hear music coming from the backyard. Unfortunately, she lacks the inspiration to play a song for both of them. After observing a cricket hops into Olive's room, they find that crickets chirp to talk with each other. Elinor's friends learn why birds fly high, while flying in Ms. Mole's hot air balloon.
42	2	"Elinor's Nest"	Karen Moonah	June 4, 2024	202
42	2	"Foody Fuel"	Renae Ruddock	June 4, 2024	202
Elinor's friends are observed to be inspired by birds to make their perfect nest. Elinor, Ari, Olive and Koa are embarking on a long Exploring Club trip. The kids bring a few different snacks, except for Koa, who only brings macaroni and cheese due to the left out. After accidentally leaving the macaroni and cheese behind, Koa becomes tired due to all the activity before finding Señor Tapir, which he learns that will eat healthy food.
43	3	"Spice Is Nice"	Madeleine Patton	June 5, 2024	203
43	3	"Ari's Muscles"	Kate Barris	June 5, 2024	203
Elinor's friends learn that type of spicy this is. Ari's muscles can't move even hard except for playing baseball.
44	4	"Teacher's Day"	Paul Moncriaffe	June 6, 2024	204
44	4	"The Nose Knows"	Michael Foulke	June 6, 2024	204
45	5	"Clean Captain"	Karen Moonah	June 7, 2024	205
45	5	"The Moment of Tooth"	Michael Foulke	June 7, 2024	205
46	6	"Just Mist"	Kate Barris	June 10, 2024	206
46	6	"Crayon Quest"	Karen Moonah	June 10, 2024	206
Ms. Mole takes her students to a mountain top that is frequently visited by fog. Olive needs a red crayon to complete here Valentine card.
47	7	"Junior Ranger Elinor"	Paul Moncrieffe	June 11, 2024	207
47	7	"Big Brother"	Adam Ruben	June 11, 2024	207
Ranger Rabbit appoints Elinor to a secondary ranger to help her colleagues by observing certain areas in the forest. Ari feels ignored when his parents focus so much on Miri.
48	8	"Flower Power"	Allison Sanders	November 4, 2024	208
48	8	"The Snow Must Go On"	N/A	November 4, 2024	208
49	9	"The Fright Stuff"	N/A	November 5, 2024	209
49	9	"Doug the Mold"	N/A	November 5, 2024	209
Elinor, Ari, and Olive ponder what costumes to don on Halloween. To feature something for show-and-tell, Ari picks an old moldy sandwich.
50	10	"Going with the Tide"	N/A	November 6, 2024	210
50	10	"Slime Time"	N/A	November 6, 2024	210
Elinor and Ari must figure how build a sand castle without it being washed away by waves. Elinor goes to Camila’s home to have a toy tea party with her.
51	11	"A Little Help"	N/A	November 7, 2024	211
51	11	"Elinor's Meadow"	N/A	November 7, 2024	211
Olive and Ari need help from lifting how nature works. Elinor and her friends learn about exploring meadows.
52	12	"Tasty Rainbow"	N/A	November 8, 2024	212
52	12	"Olive Gets the Big Picture"	N/A	November 8, 2024	212
Elinor and her friends learn about the benefits of eating a variety of different colored foods. Elinor and her friends want to take a picture of a puffin on his camera.
53	13	"Adventure in Moose Mountain"	Jorge Cham	April 21, 2025	215
Elinor, Olive, and a meteorologist help Ari find his bird plushie after it gets snatched by an eagle.
54	14	"Circus Tricks"	N/A	April 22, 2025	213
54	14	"Stuck in the Mud"	N/A	April 22, 2025	213
While practicing a circus act for a show, Elinor suddenly has a mishap and fractures her arm, therefore preventing her participation. Elinor, Ari, and Olive look for a way to make art with nature for an exhibit.
55	15	"Don't Rain on My Parade"	N/A	April 23, 2025	214
55	15	"Olive Hiccups It Up"	N/A	April 23, 2025	214
Elinor, Ari, and Olive wonder what the weather would be when the parade launches. When Olive is told that she will be doing a show in front of a lot of town folks, she becomes anxious and starts hiccuping.
56	16	"Blackout!"	Katherine Sandford	April 24, 2025	216
56	16	"Tree That Eats Toys"	Adam Ruben	April 24, 2025	216
57	17	"The Beat of a Different Drummer"	N/A	August 18, 2025	217
57	17	"The Bird Thief"	N/A	August 18, 2025	217
Elinor, Ari, and Olive must find one of Senior Tapir’s bandmates at a festival as a show is about to begin. Elinor, Ari, and Olive are having some of their stuff mysteriously taken.
58	18	"Rocks Rock"	Michael Foulke	August 19, 2025	218
58	18	"A Birthday for Bibi"	Allison Sanders	August 19, 2025	218
Ms. Beaver and her crew try to remove rocks from a field so that a show can be staged. Elinor plans to bake dumplings as a birthday gift for her grandmother.
59	19	"Downhill Dash"	N/A	August 20, 2025	219
59	19	"Brush Your Teeth"	N/A	August 20, 2025	219
Ari learns of what makes a vehicle slide down a snowy slope. Ari learns the importance of tooth-brushing.
60	20	"Don't Cry, Miri"	Madeleine Patton	August 21, 2025	220
60	20	"Cave Creatures"	Jorge Cham	August 21, 2025	220
Elinor, Ari, and Olive learn of things that can make someone shed tears besides sadness. When Ari’s bouncy ball suddenly enters a cave, he, his Dad, Elinor, and Olive go inside the place to search for it.
61	21	"Melting Point"	Renae J. Ruddock Katherine Sandford	April 28, 2026	221
61	21	"Mr. Raccoon's Bad Day"	Renae J. Ruddock Katherine Sandford	April 28, 2026	221
62	22	"Mother's Day"	Jorge Cham Allison Sanders	April 29, 2026	222
62	22	"Tricks of the Jade"	Jorge Cham Allison Sanders	April 29, 2026	222
63	23	"The Festival of the Moon"	Jorge Cham	September 21, 2026	226
Olive heads to find oddly-described creatures mentioned in her grandmother's story at the specified scene.
