= La Tuque (disambiguation) =

La Tuque may refer to:

Canada:

- La Tuque, Quebec
- La Tuque (census division)
- La Tuque (urban agglomeration)
- La Tuque Airport (IATA airport code: YLQ; ICAO airport code: CYLQ)
- La Tuque Water Aerodrome (TC airport code: CTH6)
- La Tuque railway station
- La Tuque generating station, a hydroelectric power plant on the Saint-Maurice River
- HMCS La Tuque (K670), a Canadian WWII Prestonian-class frigate
- La Tuque Wolves

== See also ==
- El Tuque, a tourist complex in Puerto Rico
- Tuque, a knit cap
- Tuque (disambiguation)
- Touques (disambiguation)
- Toque (disambiguation)
