= Holsti =

Holsti is a surname. Notable people with the surname include:

- Kalevi Holsti (born 1935), Canadian political scientist
- Ole Holsti (1933–2020), American political scientist
- Rudolf Holsti (1881–1945), Finnish politician, journalist, and diplomat

== See also ==
- Holst (surname)
