= Elinor Wonders Why =

2020 American-Canadian animated television series

- Created by: Jorge Cham; Daniel Whiteson
- Directed by: Kevin Micallef (season 1); Wesley Bryant (season 2)
- Starring: Markeda McKay; Wyatt White; Athan Giazitzidis; Maria Nash; Delia Lizette Chambers; Shoshana Sperling
- Theme music composer: Jorge Cham; Daniel Whiteson
- Opening theme: "Elinor Wonders Why Theme" by Jorge Cham and Daniel Whiteson, performed by Markeda McKay
- Ending theme: "Elinor Wonders Why Theme" (instrumental)
- Composers: Asher Lenz; Stephen Skratt
- Countries of origin: United States; Canada
- No. of seasons: 2
- No. of episodes: 63 (list of episodes)

Production
- Executive producers: Jorge Cham; Daniel Whiteson; Luis Lopez; Juan Lopez
- Producer: Esteban Ramirez
- Running time: 25 minutes
- Production companies: Pipeline Studios; Shoe Ink

Original release
- Network: PBS Kids
- Release: September 7, 2020 – present

Elinor Wonders Why is an animated television series created by Jorge Cham and Daniel Whiteson. It revolves around Elinor, a young and curious rabbit girl. The series premiered on September 7, 2020 on PBS Kids.

== Overview ==
The exploration-themed show encourages children to follow their curiosity, ask questions when they don't understand, and find answers using science inquiry skills. The main character, Elinor, is the most observant and curious bunny rabbit in Animal Town just north of Natural Forest, California. She introduces children ages 3–6 to science, nature, and communities through adventures with her friends Olive and Ari. Each episode includes two 11-minute animated stories, plus interstitial content, where Elinor and her classmates enjoy either Señor Tapir singing about famous nature explorers or Ms. Mole reading stories.

== Characters ==
=== Main ===
- Elinor Rabbit (voiced by Markeda McKay) – A white bunny girl with an inquisitive nature and a sweet personality.
- Ari Bat (voiced by Wyatt White in season 1 and Athan Giazitzidis in season 2) – A funny, imaginative light brown bat boy who lives in a hollow boulder, and is one of Elinor's best friends.
- Olive Elephant (voiced by Maria Nash in season 1 and Delia Lizette Chambers in season 2) – An elephant calf girl who is one of Elinor's best friends. She often makes charts for whatever questions are being asked.
- Ranger Rabbit (voiced by Lisette St. Louis) – Elinor's mom, who works as a park ranger.
- Mr. Rabbit (voiced by Colin Doyle) – Elinor's dad.
- Ms. Mole (voiced by Shoshana Sperling) – A brown mole who is Elinor, Ari and Olive's teacher. She wears glasses.

=== Recurring ===
- Ms. Elephant (voiced by Ana Sani) Olive's mom.
- Señor Tapir (voiced by Juan Chioran) – A Spanish-accented tapir that sings about famous explorers and inventors during interstitials.
- Mr. Raccoon (voiced by Dan Darin-Zanco) – A raccoon who runs a bakery.
- Rollie Armadillo (voiced by Eric Khou) – An armadillo who is one of Elinor, Ari, and Olive's classmates.
- Ms. Llama (voiced by Nicole Stamp) – A llama who owns a fruit cart.
- Mr. Dog (voiced by Paul Bates) – A dog who loves to bury his things into the ground.
- Tito Mouse (voiced by Leo Orgil in season 1 and River Morales in season 2) – A mouse who is one of Elinor, Ari, and Olive's classmates.
- Mr. Bat (voiced by Raoul Bhaneja) – Ari's dad.
- Mr. Lion (voiced by Kevin Dennis) – A lion who likes to paint pictures.
- Koa (voiced by Ian Ho) – A brown wombat who is one of Elinor, Ari, and Olive's classmates.
- Camilla Dromedary (voiced by Norah Adams) – A camel who is a friend of Elinor, Ari, and Olive.
- Sally Beaver (voiced by Royal Goodfellow) – A beaver who is one of Elinor, Ari, and Olive's classmates.
- Mary and Lizzie Goat (voiced by Abigail and Grace Oliver) – Twin goat girls who are Elinor, Ari, and Olive's classmates.
- Alejandro Possum (voiced by Sergio Di Zio) – A possum whose name is never mentioned in the series.
- Silas Cheetah (voiced by Callum Shoniker in season 1 and Dax Catre in season 2) – A cheetah who is one of Elinor, Ari, and Olive's classmates.
- Baba and Bibi (voiced by George Buza and Linda Kash respectively) – Elinor's paternal grandparents who live in Desert Town.
- Deputy Mouse (voiced by Ron Pardo)
- Ms. Beaver (voiced by Diane Saleme)
- Farmer Bear (voiced by Ellen Dublin)
- Ms. Bat (voiced by Shoshana Sperling) – Ari's mom.
- Mr. Hamster (voiced by Cliff Saunders) – A hamster who is a substitute teacher in Elinor’s class.
- Sigmund "Siggy" Squirrel (voiced by Simon Pirso in season 1 and Luke Dietz in season 2) – A squirrel.
- Lola (voiced by Elana Dunkelman) – Koa's big sister.
- Mr. Beaver (voiced by Mike Petersen)
- Mr. Hippo (voiced by Derek McGrath)
- Mr. Antelope (voiced by Eddie Glen)
- Hazel Lion (voiced by Svea Ham) – Mr. Lion's daughter.
- Mehdi Fox (voiced by Malik Hassan) – A fennec fox who is one of Elinor, Ari and Olive's classmates.

== Episodes ==
Season	Segments	Episodes	Originally released	
Season	Segments	Episodes	First released	Last released
1	80	40	September 7, 2020	April 21, 2022
2	TBA	TBA	June 3, 2024	TBA

== Development and production ==
Development of the show began in 2017, when Cham and Whiteson were approached by PBS. PBS found Cham's comic, Piled Higher and Deeper, online and asked if he was interested in pitching to them. "I reached out to Daniel, and what inspires us beyond science is our children," Cham recalled. "They are curious, and it motivated us to create the show." Cham cites Pogo and Calvin and Hobbes as inspiration for the show's visual design, which he described as "something that felt natural and calming, as opposed to overloaded or frenetic."

The character of Elinor was inspired by Cham's own daughter, Elinor. Cham said "She was about 4, which is just at that perfect age where she really does wonder why, all the time. Any answer you give her, she’ll (have) a follow-up question, another why." Cham and Whiteson went with animals as the show's characters to make them "appealing but also relatable at the same time", and to "highlight their range of skills and abilities".

The first season of the show was funded in part by a Ready to Learn grant from the United States Department of Education. The second season of the series was funded in part by a National Science Foundation grant.

== Broadcast ==
The series premiered on PBS Kids in the United States on September 7, 2020, as a sneak peek by showing the first 2 episodes, before regularly airing new episodes on September 8. Some episodes are available on Amazon Prime Video in the United States.

PBS International has licensed the series to Canada, Latin America, Finland, Israel, Sweden and the United Arab Emirates via Knowledge Network, Discovery Kids, Yle, Hop!, SVT and E-Junior, respectively. The series airs on Australia on the PBS Kids channel, which was started as a venture with Foxtel in July 2021.

== Home media ==
From 2021 to 2025, the series released various episodes on PBS Kids compilation DVDs.

== Reception ==
Starr Rhett Rocque of Fast Company wrote, "This clever series...encourages curiosity."

=== Awards and nominations ===
Year	Award	Category	Nominee	Result	Ref.
2021	Daytime Emmy Awards	Outstanding Preschool Children’s Animated Series	Elinor Wonders Why	Nominated	
2021	Daytime Emmy Awards	Outstanding Directing Team for a Preschool Animated Program	Elinor Wonders Why	Nominated	
2022	Writers Guild of Canada	WGC Screenwriting Awards – Preschool	"Olive's Tree"	Won	
2023	Annie Awards	Best Animated Television/Broadcast Production for Preschool Children	"Rest is Best"	Nominated	

== Graphic novel series ==
Elinor Wonders Why: Hiding in Plain Sight, described as one of two launch titles for a graphic novel series based on the show, was announced in February 2022. Two titles, Hiding in Plain Sight and Forest Giants, released on September 6, 2022.
