= Tokle =

Tokle is a Norwegian surname. Notable people with the surname include:

- Arthur E. Tokle (1922–2005), a Norwegian-born American ski jumper and coach
- Torger Tokle (1919–1945), a Norwegian-born American ski jumper, brother of Arthur

== See also ==
- Toke (given name)
