= Toke (given name) =

Toke is a given name, commonly used for males in Scandinavia and either gender in Finland. Notable people with the given name include:

== People ==
- Chief Toke, 19th-century Native American leader
- Toke Holst (born 1981), Danish handball player
- Toke Makinwa (born 1984), Nigerian radio and television presenter
- Toke Reichstein (born 1976), Danish economist
- Toke Talagi (born 1960), Niuean politician and premier
- Toke Townley (1912–1984), British actor

== See also ==
- Toke (disambiguation)
