= Toke =

Toke may refer to:

== People ==
- Toke (given name), a list of people with the name Toke
- Chief Toke, a leader of the Shoalwater Bay Tribe of Native Americans on the Pacific coast of Washington
- Emma Toke (1812–1878), British Anglican hymn writer
- John Toke (1671–1746), an English Member of Parliament and lawyer
- Soane Toke, a king of Uvea (Wallis island, South Pacific), ruling for one day on 11 December 1953
- Toma Toke (born 1985), a Tongan rugby union footballer

== Places ==
- Toke (lake), a lake in Drangedal municipality in Telemark county, Norway
- Tok, Alaska, a census-designated place (CDP) in Southeast Fairbanks Census Area, Alaska, United States
  (The name of the settlement is pronounced "toke," but is spelled "Tok.")
- Toke Atoll, an atoll in the Marshall Islands
- Toke Station, a railway station located in Midori-ku, Chiba, Japan
- Toke, as in 'toke it up', refers to the smoking of cannabis

== See also ==
- toque (disambiguation)
