= Copenhagen Zoo =

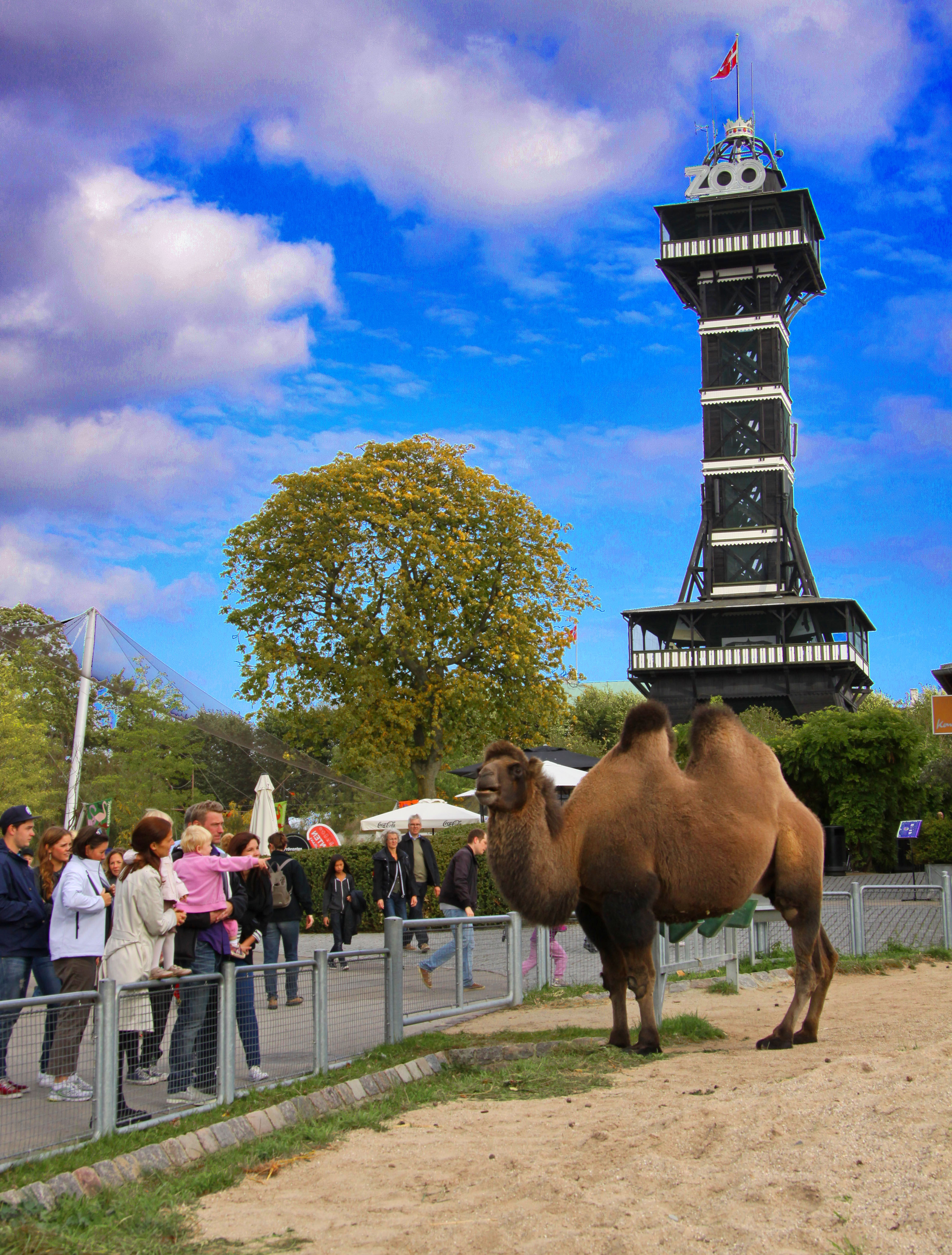
- Copenhagen Zoo Tower, 2012
- Interactive map of Copenhagen Zoo
- 55°40′22″N 12°31′17″E
- Date opened: 1859
- Location: Copenhagen, Denmark
- Land area: 11 hectares (27 acres)
- No. of animals: 4000+ (2025)
- No. of species: 221 (2025)
- Annual visitors: 1,296,373 (2025)
- Memberships: EAZA, WAZA
- Website: www.zoo.dkuk.zoo.dk

Copenhagen Zoo (Danish: København Zoo) is a zoological garden in Copenhagen, Denmark. Founded in 1859, it is one of the oldest zoos in Europe and is a member of EAZA. It comprises 11 hectares (27 acres) and is located in the municipality of Frederiksberg, sandwiched between the parks of Frederiksberg Gardens and Søndermarken. Copenhagen Zoo recorded 1,296,373 visits in 2025. Statistics Denmark identified it as the country's most visited state-supported zoological facility that year. Since 2019, the zoo has been home to two giant pandas on loan from China under a panda loan agreement, making it one of a small number of zoos in Europe to house the species. The panda habitat, a 4,000-square-metre structure designed by Bjarke Ingels and David Zahle of Bjarke Ingels Group, is shaped as a yin and yang symbol and opened in April 2019. The zoo is also home to the elephant house designed by British architect Norman Foster in cooperation with Danish landscape architect Stig L. Andersson, which opened in 2008. Indoor attractions include the Tropical Zoo rainforest hall with free-ranging birds and two-toed sloths, and the Arctic Ring, featuring an underwater viewing tunnel for polar bears. The zoo's facilities include several restaurants, among them Bistro Panpan, located within the panda habitat. Copenhagen Zoo is the only zoo in Europe to maintain a breeding population of Tasmanian devils and houses a Children's Zoo with domestic animals. The zoo maintains and promotes a number of European breeding programmes. The zoo participates in European conservation programmes and is one of the four hubs of the EAZA Biobank, which stores biological samples for research and conservation. In 2026, a 160-metre Leopard Trail was added for the zoo's Amur leopards, one of the world's most critically endangered predators with approximately 50 individuals remaining in the wild.

== History ==
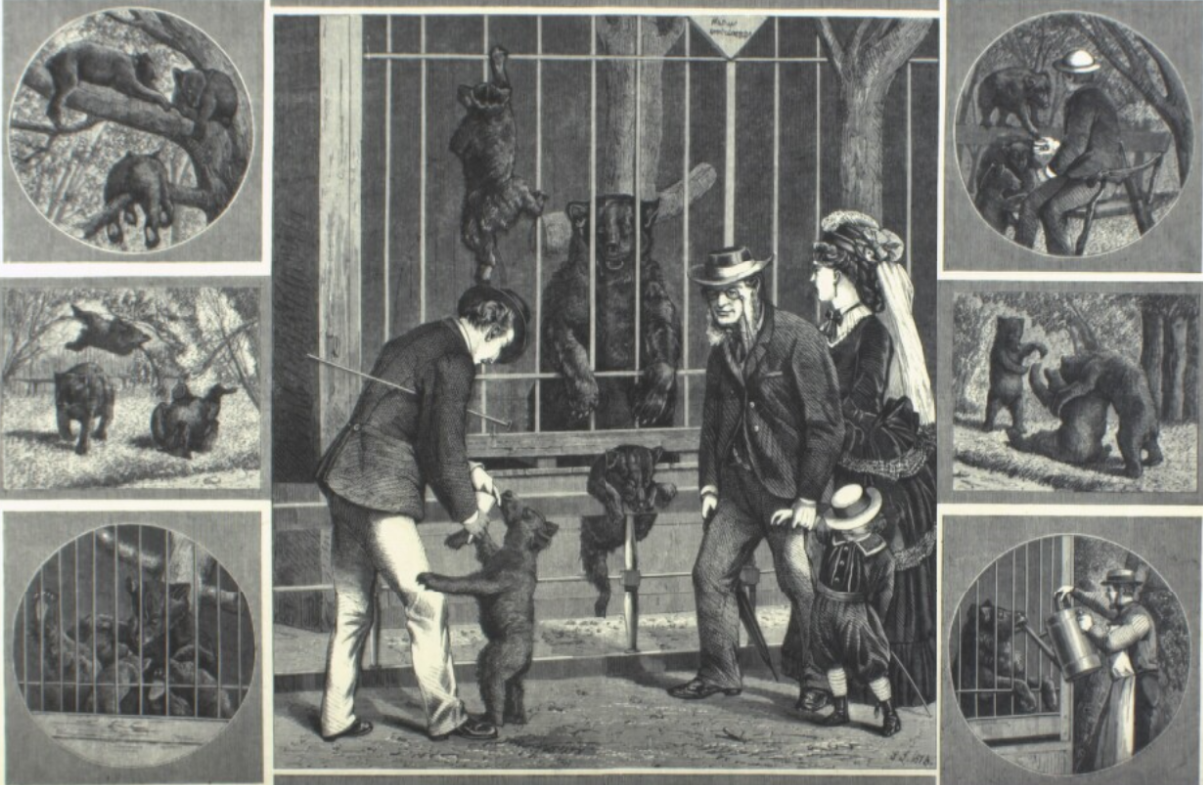
Copenhagen Zoo, 1873

Copenhagen Zoo was founded by the ornithologist Niels Kjærbølling in 1859. He was given the summer garden of "Prinsess Vilhelmines Have" (The garden of Princess Vilhelmine) by the chief directorate of Copenhagen. The animals that the visitors could contemplate at the opening were eagles, chickens, ducks, owls, rabbits, a fox, a seal in a bathtub and a turtle in a bucket. In the early years the zoo focused on showing as many different types of animals as possible, but as animal welfare later became an issue, the number of different species has dropped in favour of more space to each animal. In 1901 the zoo had a human display with 25 Indians- men, women and children- in an exhibition where the "brown exotic" people went about their daily lives in palm tree leaf huts constructed in the middle of the zoo. One of the most notable animals kept there was a male slow worm that lived there from 1892 to 1946 (for 54 years, which is a record among lizards).

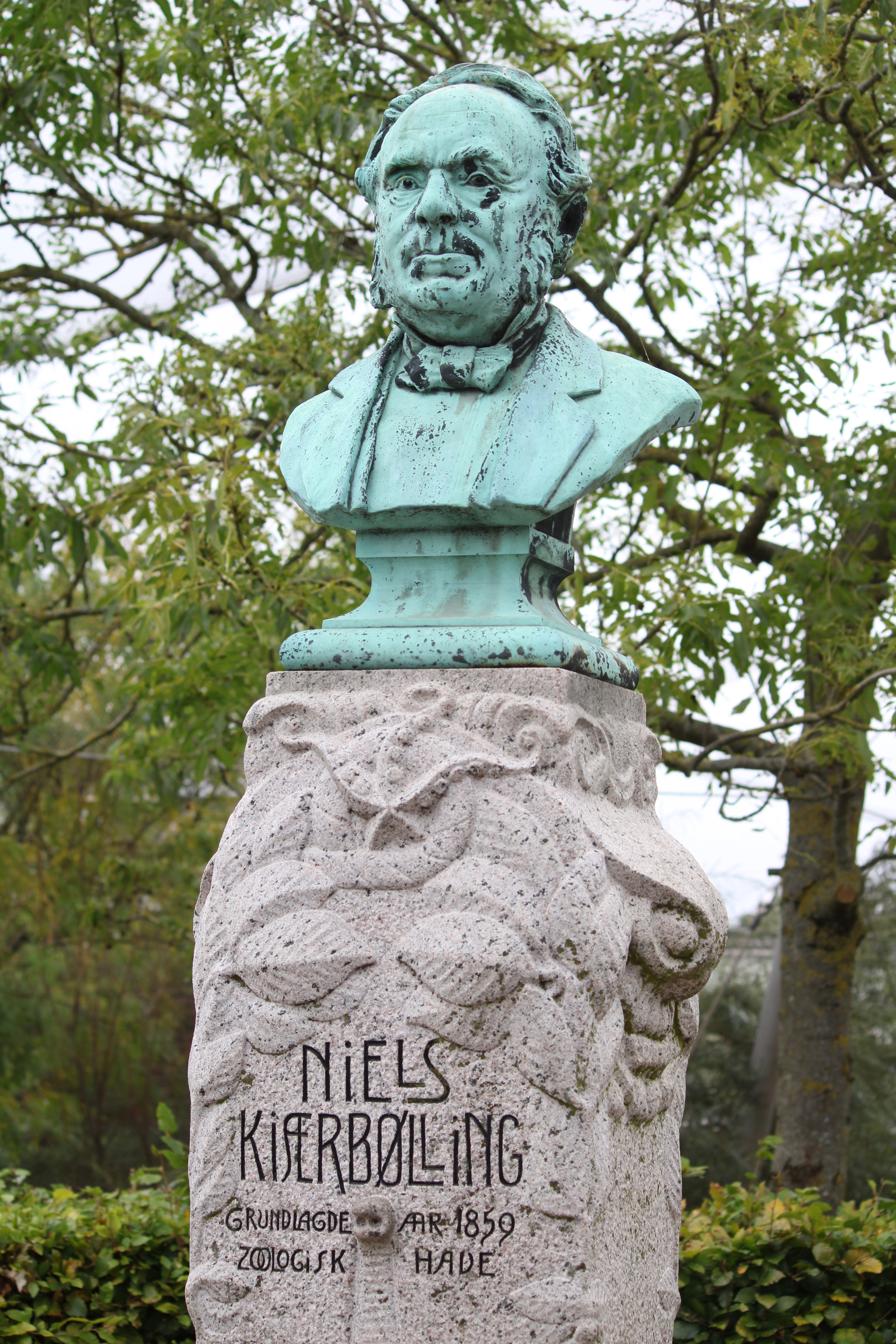
Statue of zoo founder Niels Kjærbølling near the main entrance

Starting in the early 1980s, Copenhagen Zoo has been undergoing a renovations aimed at replacing cages with enclosures which recreate animals' natural environments, giving a better lifestyle to the animals, and a more realistic experience to visitors. The Elephant House and 1.5-hectare (3.7-acre) Savanna are results of these efforts. The Savanna includes a Hippopotamus House where the hippos can be watched underwater.

The zoo has preserved many of its historical buildings. The oldest building still in use, a stable for yaks, was erected in 1872, and now houses the bactrian camels. A Herbivore House built in 1875 still houses herbivores, namely tapirs. An owl tower from 1885 is today left as a memorial commemorating how zoo animals were once kept.

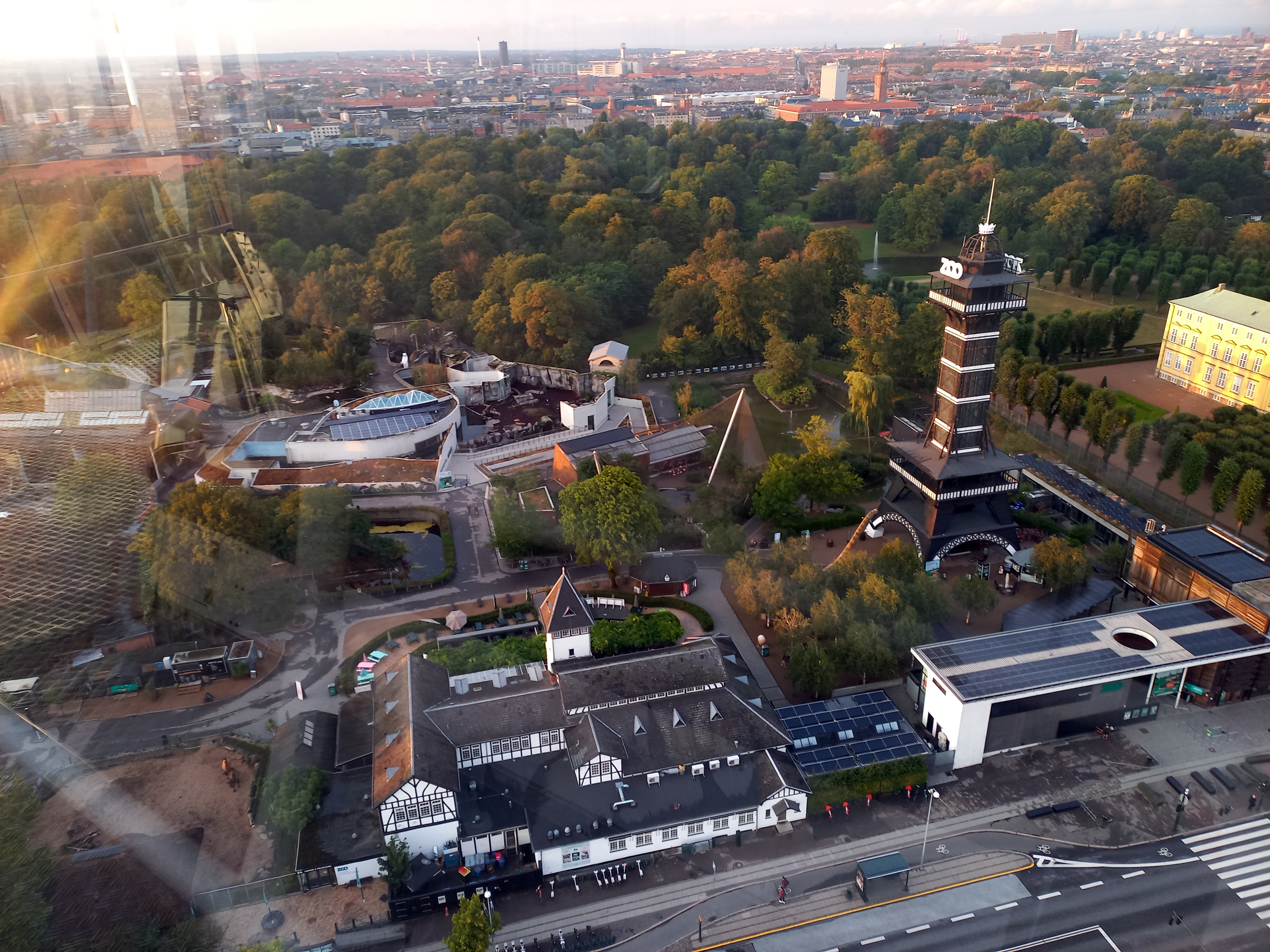
Part of the zoo seen above from the temporary skyliner

A notable and highly visible feature of the zoo is the wooden observation tower. 43.5 metres (142.7 ft) high, it offers views of the surrounding parklands and city. The tower was built in 1905 and is one of the tallest observation towers built of wood in the world. Its base is similar to that of Eiffel Tower.

== Exhibits ==
Animals exhibited at the zoo that are not housed in any of the main areas include bactrian camels, American flamingos, scarlet ibises, roseate spoonbills, Dalmatian pelicans, turkey vultures, Humboldt penguins, California sea lions, black-capped squirrel monkeys, chimpanzees and lions.

=== The Nordics and the Arctic Ring ===
In the part of the zoo called "The Nordics" (Danish: Norden), visitors can see species such as harbour seals, snowy owls, reindeer, musk oxen, brown bears, arctic foxes and grey wolves. The "Arctic Ring" (Danish: Den Arktiske Ring), which opened in 2013, has an exhibit for polar bears (including a tunnel allowing underwater views) and an aviary for North Atlantic seabirds (alcids).

=== Asia ===
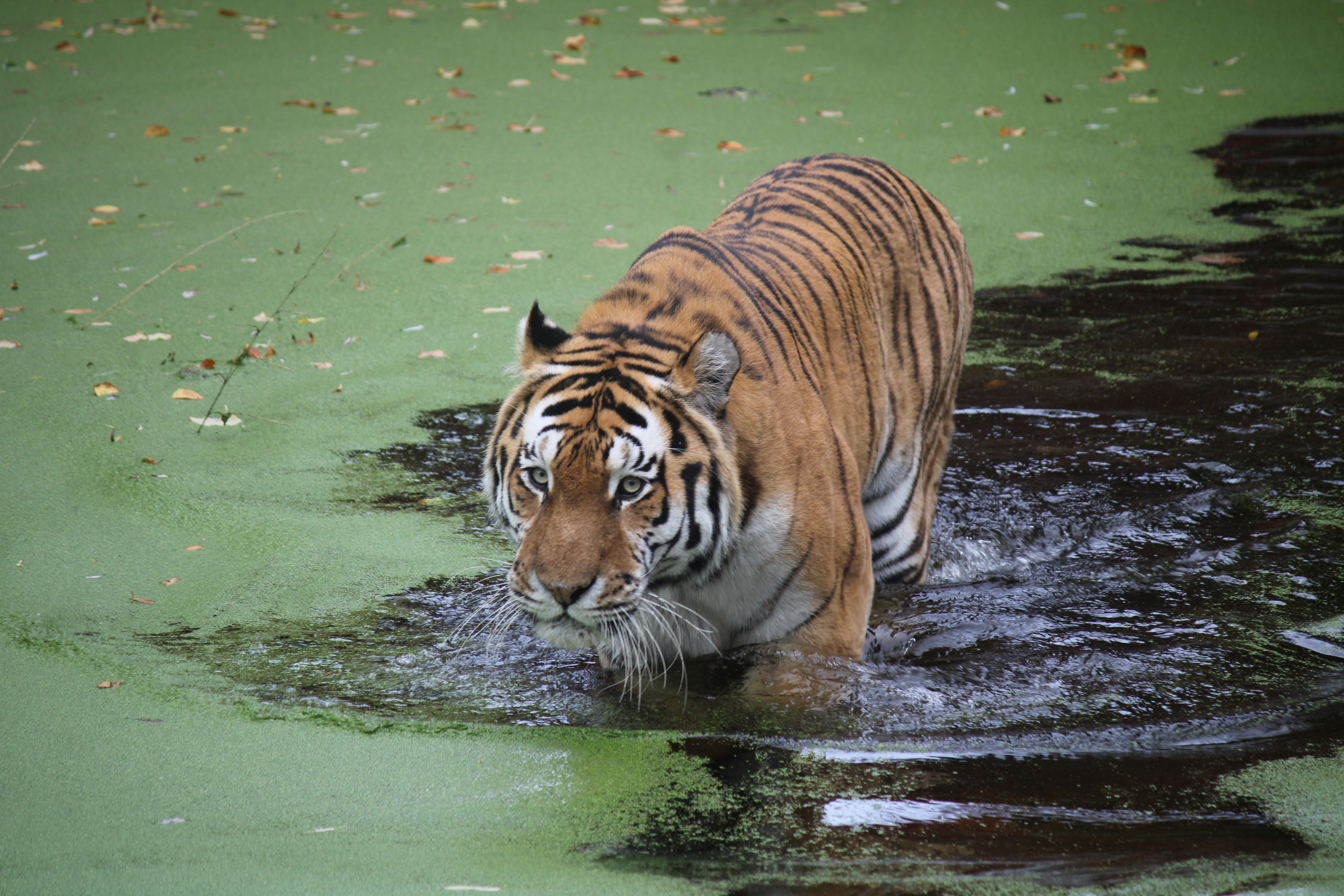
Tiger walking in the water, 2025

In the "Asia" (Danish: Asien) section, visitors can see Oriental small-clawed otters, red pandas, Malayan tapirs, Amur leopards, tigers, Asian elephants, and other animals. In March 2026, the zoo opened a 160-metre Leopard Trail designed by HMJ ZooDesign, extending the Amur leopard habitat from the existing enclosure past the Elephant House to the bamboo forest adjacent to the panda habitat. The trail is covered by netting and provides the leopards with additional space to patrol and observe their surroundings. The Amur leopard is critically endangered, with approximately 50 individuals estimated to remain in the wild.

The new Elephant House, which opened in June 2008, is designed by Norman Foster in cooperation with the Danish landscape architect Stig L. Andersson. It houses Asian elephants, and contains two glass-domed enclosures. One is for cows and calves and measures 45 by 23 metres (148 by 75 ft). The other is 30 by 15 metres (98 by 49 ft) and is for bulls, kept in separate pens during the mating season for fear of fights. The building also contain an exhibit space and a small lecture hall. The enclosures open out through mighty rusted steel doors into am almost 1 hectare big landscaped paddock with a pool 3 metres (9.8 ft) deep and 60 metres (200 ft) long.

The paddock's border with Frederiksberg Gardens, once a 3-metre (9.8 ft) high wall, has been opened up so that people in the park can watch the elephants.

=== Africa ===
Most of the "Africa" (Danish: Afrika) section is taken up by the "Savanna" (Danish: Savannen) area. This is an open field with a visitor bridge above containing species such as white rhinoceroses, giraffes, impalas, sable antelopes, ostriches and plains zebras. The hippopotamuses, which have their own separate enclosure, also have partial access to the Savanna. Other species in the Africa section include okapis, Abyssinian ground hornbills, Congo peafowl, caracals and meerkats.

=== Tasmania ===
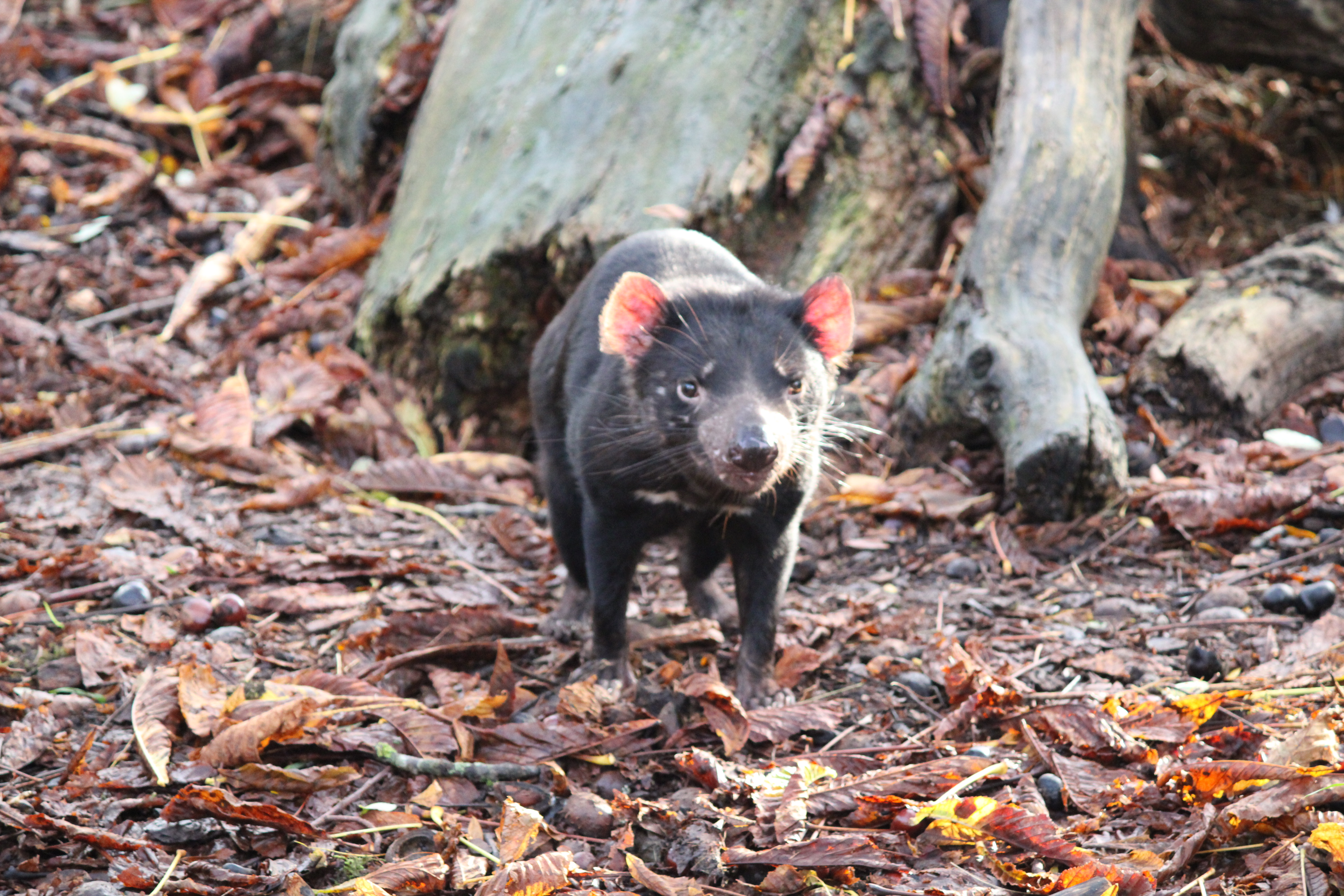
A Tasmanian devil, 2025

The "Tasmania" (Danish: Tasmanien) section is unique to Copenhagen Zoo. The section was started after the wedding of Frederik, the Crown Prince of Denmark and the Tasmanian native Mary Donaldson in 2004, where the Tasmanian government gifted four Tasmanian Devils to the zoo. These were the first Tasmanian devils to live outside of Australia. The area has since been expanded with a combined area for red-necked wallabies, eastern grey kangaroos and common wombats. Parts of this area is also accessible by visitors, allowing kangaroos and people to cross paths.

=== South America ===
In the "South America" (Danish: Sydamerika) section, visitors can see species such as capybaras, guanacos, greater rheas, Patagonian maras, southern screamers and giant anteaters. They all have access to one common area, modeled after the South American pampas.

=== Tropical Zoo ===
The "Tropical Zoo" (Danish: Tropezoo) consists of a rainforest hall with one section for free-ranging birds, turtles and two-toed sloths and another for tropical butterflies and West African crocodiles. In between the two is a section for reptiles, amphibians, fish and rare Java mouse-deer.

=== Children's Zoo ===
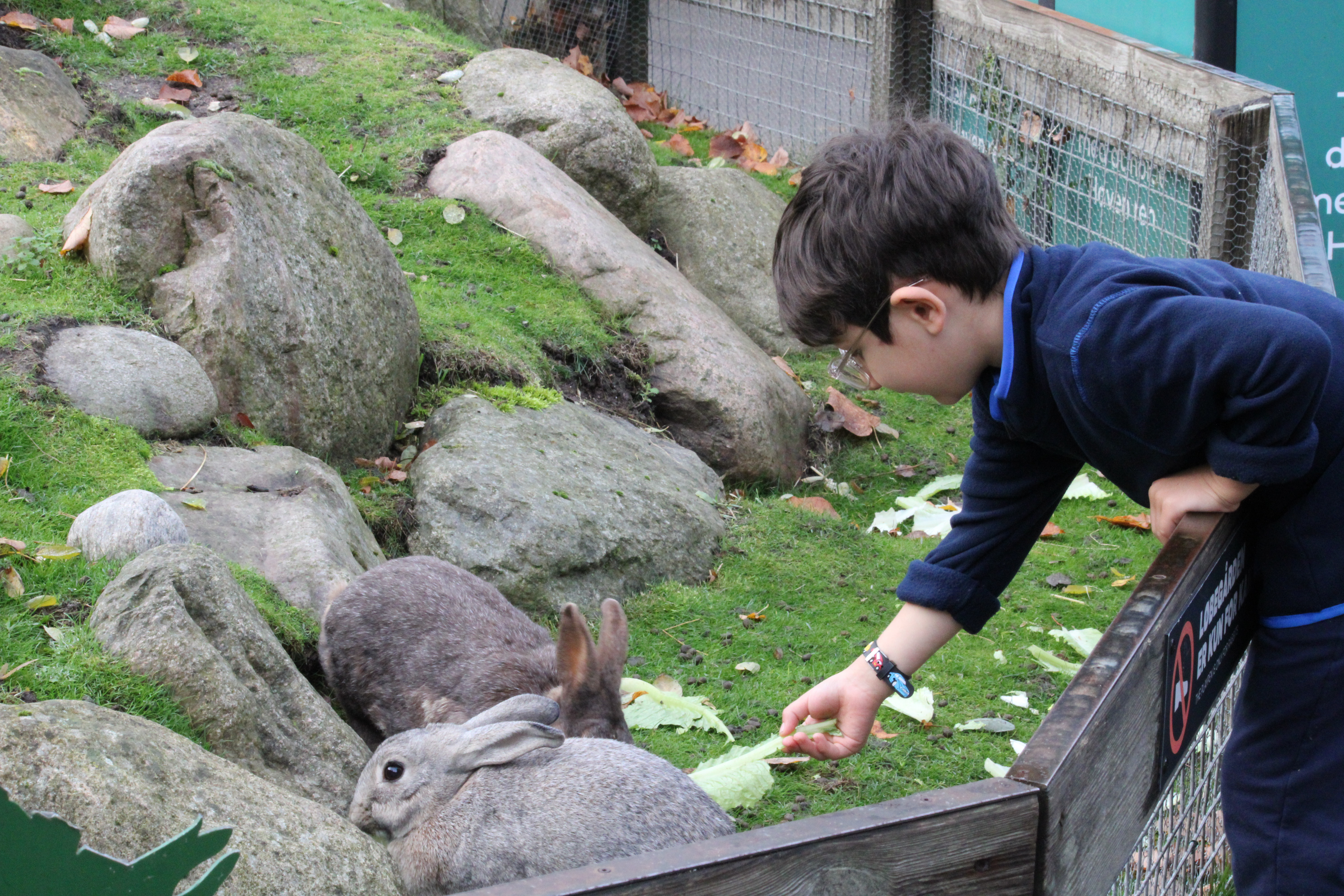
A boy feeding domestic rabbits

In the Children's Zoo (Danish: Børnezoo), visitors can see farm animals and small domestic animals, such as llamas, goats, cows, pigs, horses, chickens and rabbits.

== Conservation and research ==
Copenhagen Zoo participates in conservation programmes for threatened animal species. In Denmark, its work includes breeding and reintroduction programmes for amphibians, including the European fire-bellied toad. The zoo's amphibian conservation work began in 2002.

Copenhagen Zoo is one of the four hubs of the European Association of Zoos and Aquaria (EAZA) Biobank. The Biobank stores biological samples, including blood and tissue, which can be used in research and conservation management.

The zoo has also been used for scientific research. A study published in *Current Biology* in 2022 collected air samples at three locations in Copenhagen Zoo and identified environmental DNA from 49 vertebrate species. One of the study's co-authors was affiliated with the zoo's Center for Wild Animal Health.

== Rare species ==
- For several years, Copenhagen Zoo was the only zoo outside Australia to house Tasmanian devils, They bred for the first time in Copenhagen Zoo in 2013, and the two females gave birth to a total of seven joeys.
- Other rare species and subspecies kept in the zoo include Schmitz's caracals, Cape weavers, black-necked weavers, East African chimpanzees, yellow-headed amazons, pink-tongued skinks, Tasmanian wombats, Tasmanian eastern grey kangaroos, banded razorbills and West African crocodiles; all of which are rarely-kept species in European zoos.
- Copenhagen Zoo houses rare Amur leopards, okapis, and musk oxen.

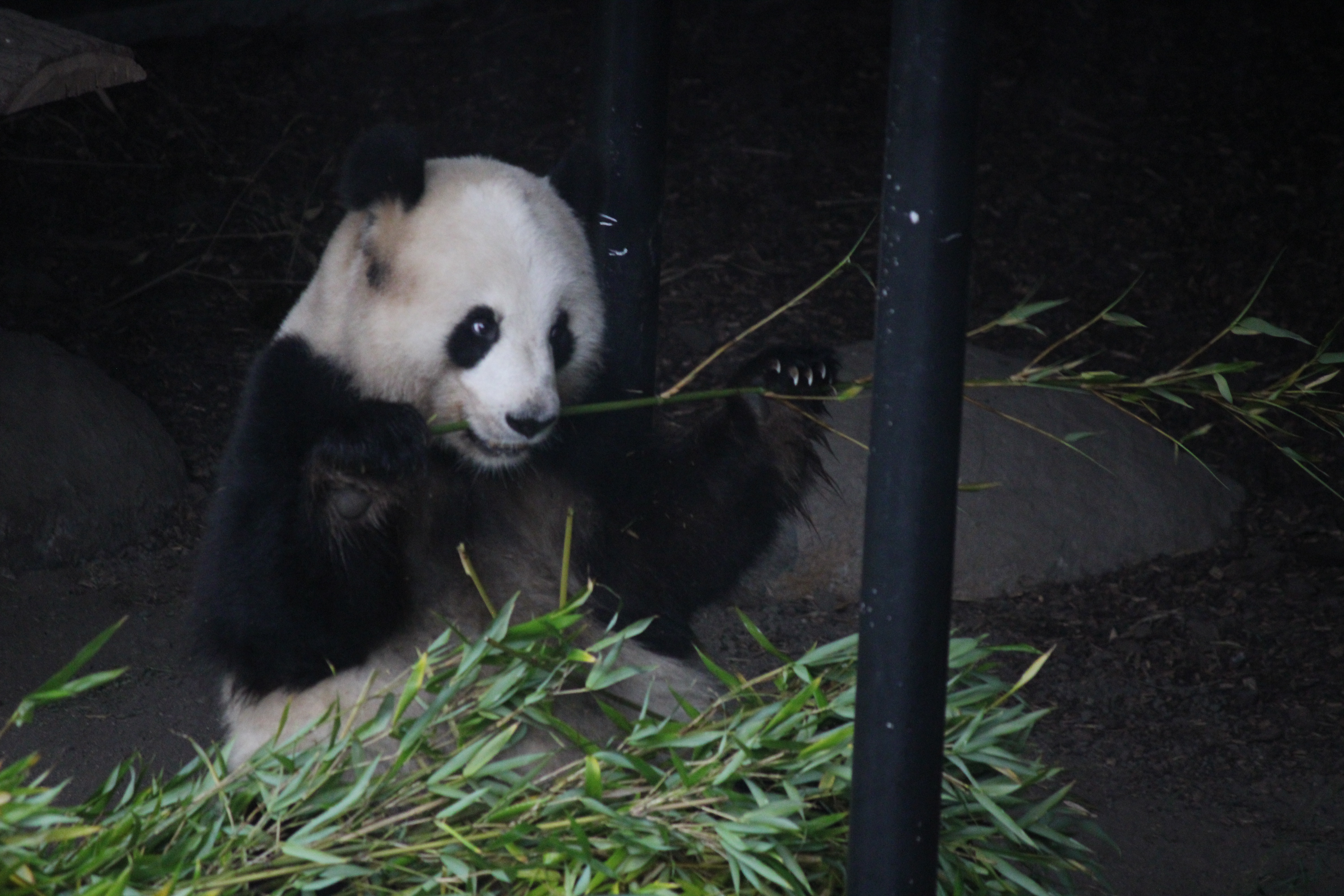
The pandas are among the zoo's rarest species and an example of panda diplomacy. Their enclosure was designed by Bjarke Ingels.

- In April 2019, Copenhagen Zoo received two giant pandas on loan from China.

== Culling controversy ==
A healthy young male giraffe, Marius, was killed on 9 February 2014 on the recommendation of the European Association of Zoos and Aquaria. His meat was fed to the zoo's lions, while other parts were transferred to a scientific institution. The scientific director at Copenhagen Zoo, Bengt Holst defended the culling, saying that the giraffes at the zoo bred very well, and where this was the case, giraffes had to be killed to ensure the best genes were passed down to ensure the animals' long-term survival. He confirmed the zoo typically culls 20 to 30 animals every year. The death occurred despite offers from other animal institutions (EAZA member Yorkshire Wildlife Park (YWP) in the United Kingdom and Hoenderdael Park in The Netherlands) to take the giraffe.

YWP released a statement that it had the capacity to accept a further giraffe into its bachelor herd in its state-of-the-art giraffe house built in 2012, and that contact had been made with Copenhagen Zoo but no reply had been received. YWP has previously received a male giraffe of the same age as Marius from Copenhagen Zoo. Bengt Holst stated that the capacity at YWP would be better utilised by a giraffe whose genes were less represented amongst EAZA zoos.

The action was criticized by Stine Jensen from Denmark's Organisation Against the Suffering of Animals, who repudiated the action as unethical. She said, "This situation should not have occurred at all. It just shows that the zoo is in fact not the ethical institution that it wants to portray itself as being, because here you have a waste product - that being Marius. Here we have a zoo which thinks that putting this giraffe down instead of thinking of alternatives is the best option".

Images of the carcass being cut up in front of children and then fed to the zoo's lion population were circulated by the Associated Press. The zoo spokesperson, Tobias Stenbaek Bro, has been quoted as saying that visitors, including children, were invited to watch as the giraffe was skinned and parts fed to the lions. "I'm actually proud because I think we have given children a huge understanding of the anatomy of a giraffe that they wouldn't have had from watching a giraffe in a photo," Stenbaek Bro said in a telephone interview with the Associated Press.

On 25 March 2014, despite the backlash from the giraffe cull, the zoo euthanized four lions (two adults and two ten-month-old cubs). The zoo stated that they were introducing a male lion and did not want to disrupt the pride's natural structure and behaviour. The lions were not culled or dissected in public.

== Cultural references ==
Copenhagen Zoo is used as location in the films Københavnere (1933), Wienerbarnet (1941), Hold fingrene fra mor (1951), Far til fire på landet (1955), Vi er allesammen tossede (1959), Rikki og mændene (1962), Den store badedag (1991), Jungledyret Hugo (1993), and Far til fire på japansk (2010).

The zoo is also used as location in episode 84 of the DR television show Huset på Christianshavn and in the TV2 television Christmas calendar Brødrenes Mortensens jul.

== Exhibit gallery ==
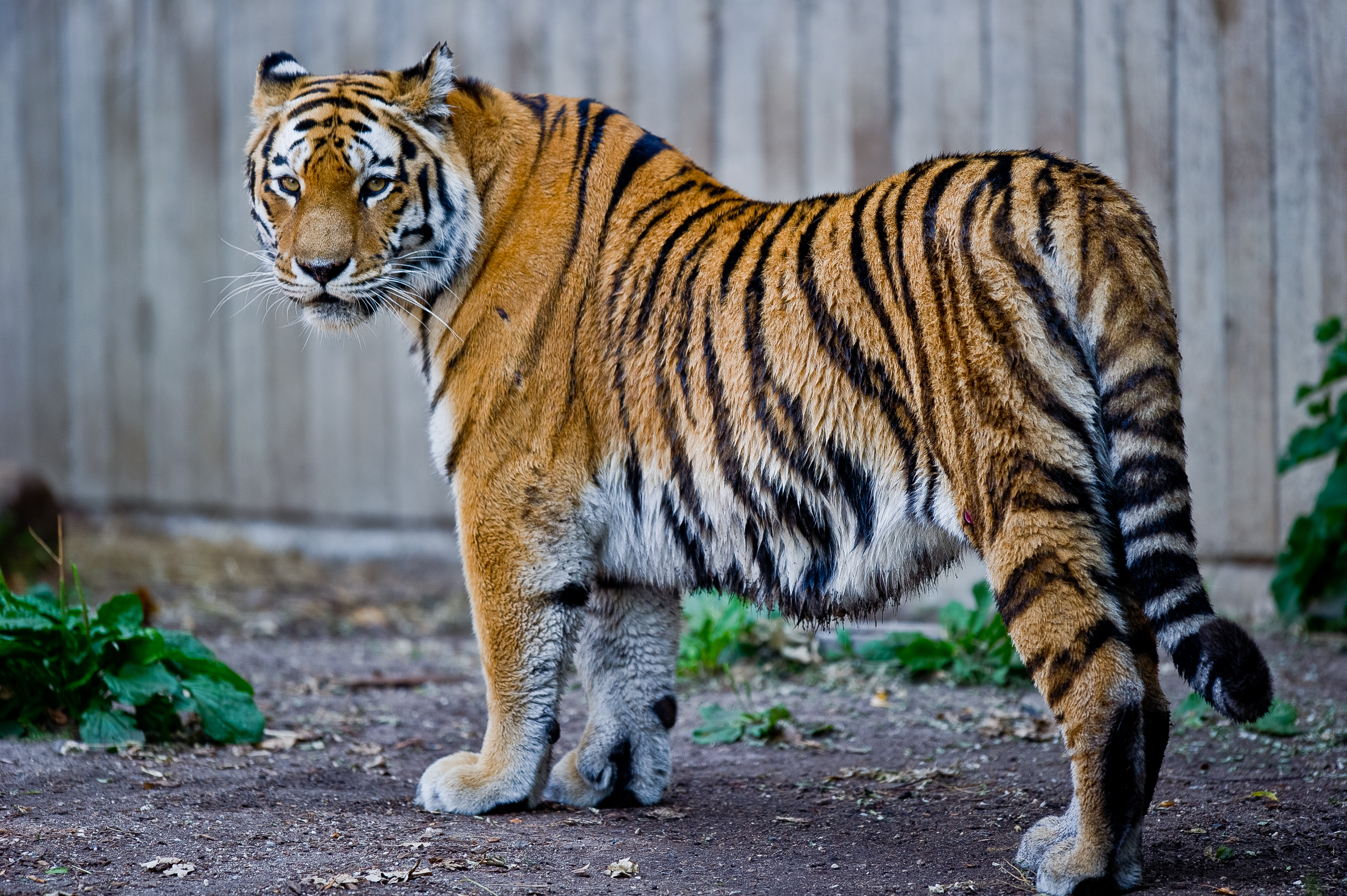
An Amur tiger (Panthera tigris tigris as of 2017)

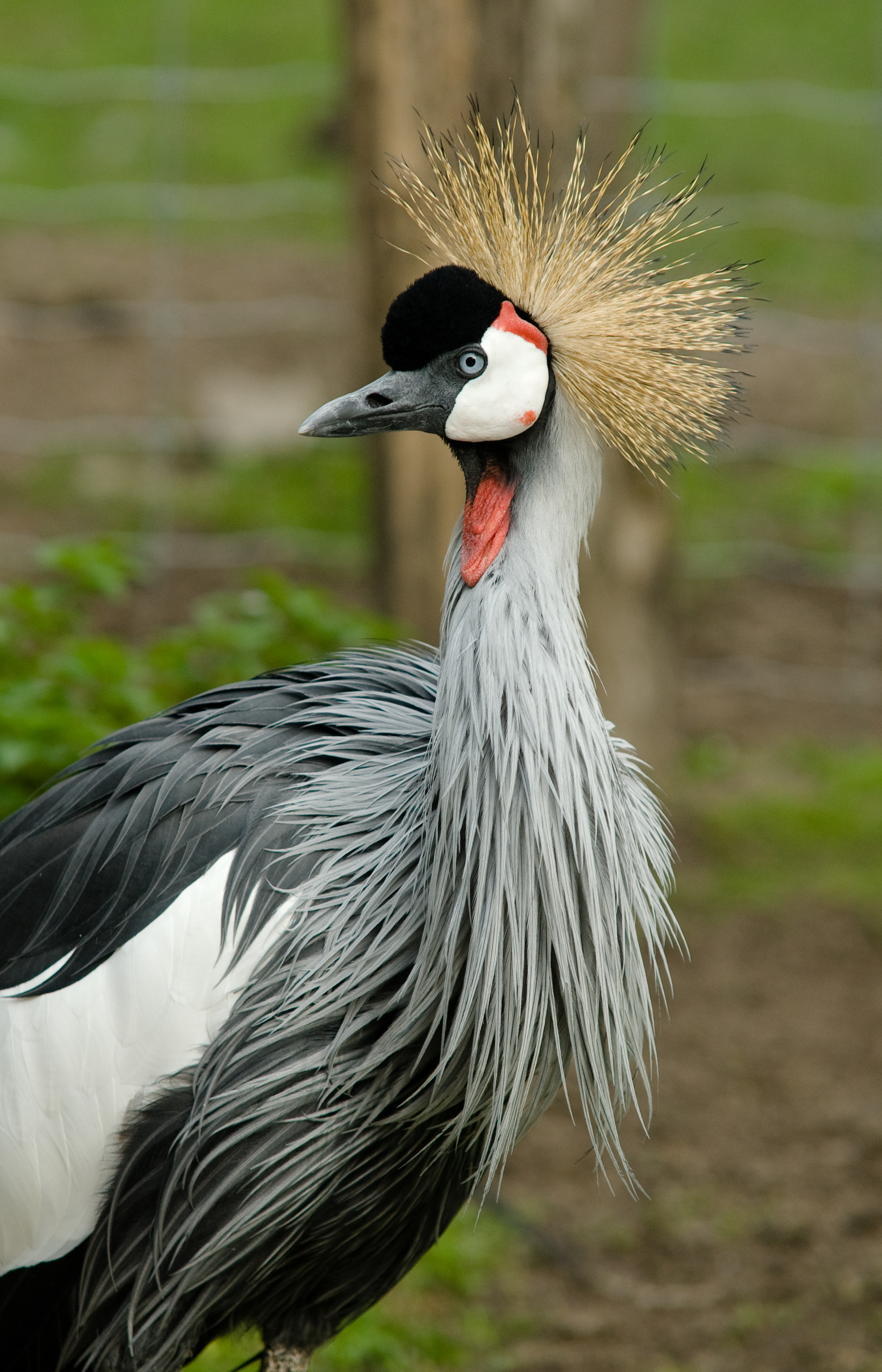
A grey crowned crane (Balearica regulorumin)

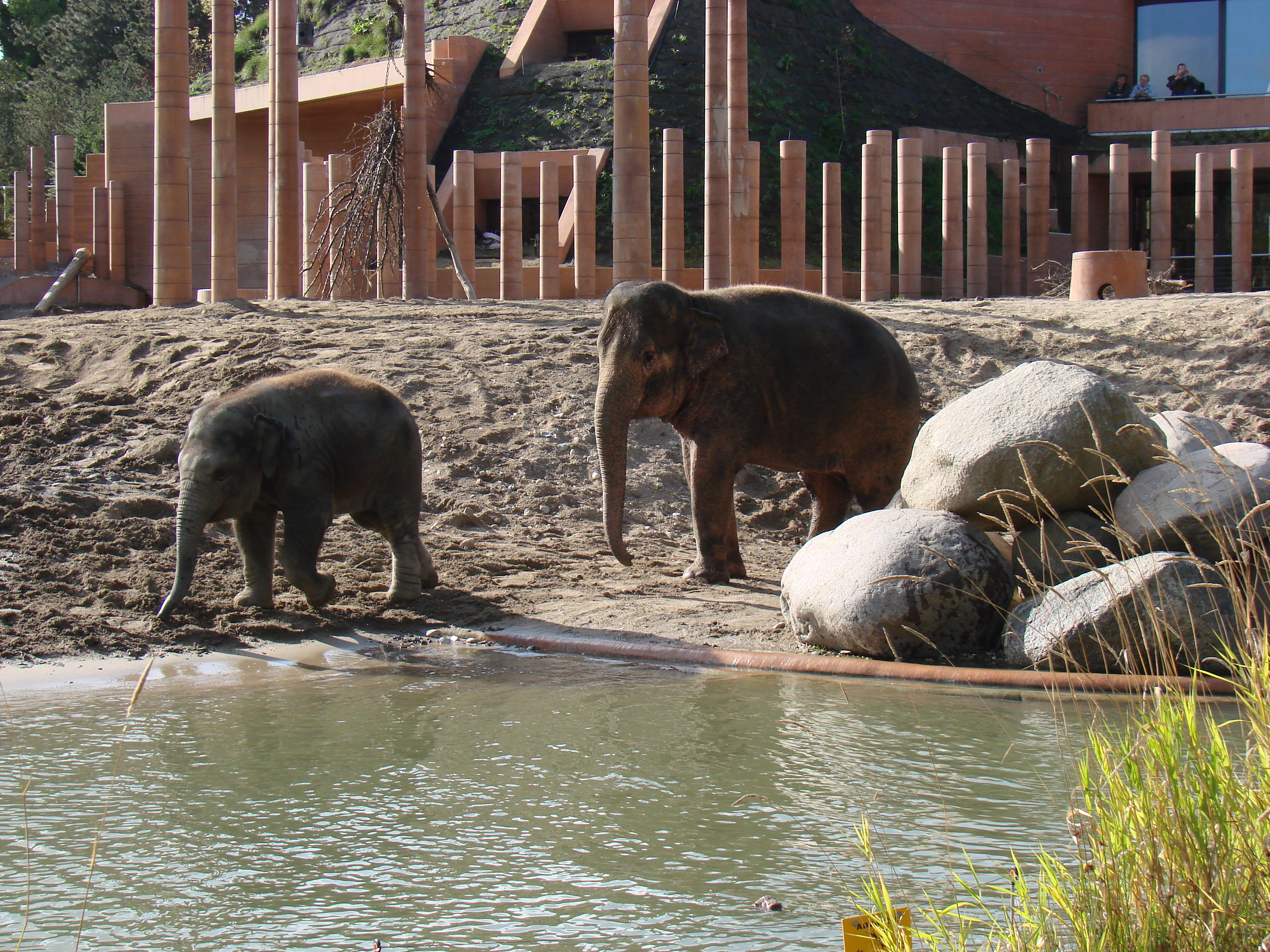
Asian elephants (Elephas maximus) in the grounds of the new Elephant House

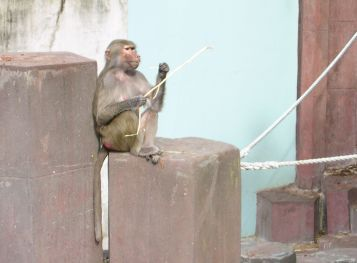
A hamadryas baboon (Papio hamadryas)

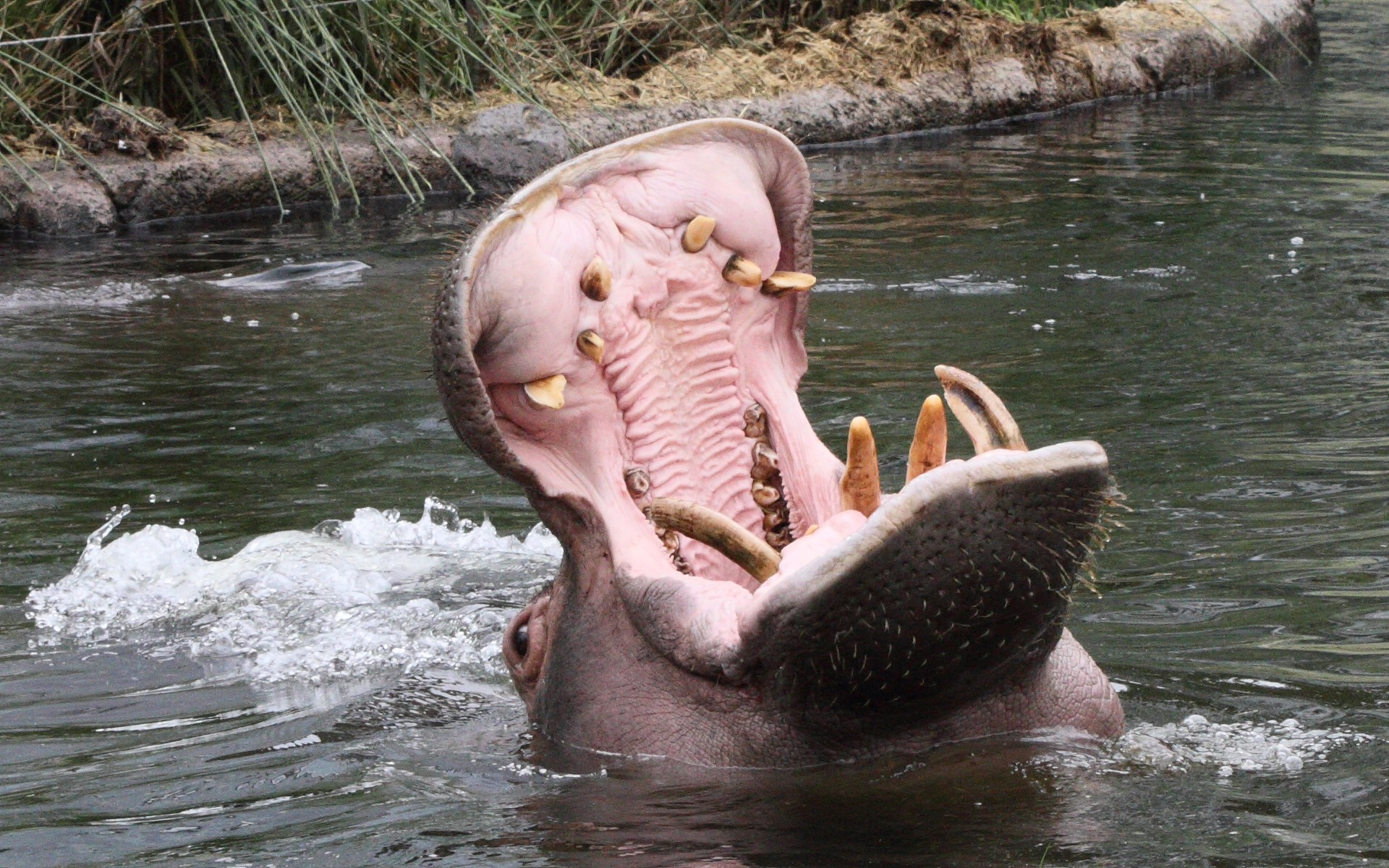
A hippo (Hippopotamus amphibius) yawning
