= Tuque (disambiguation) =

A tuque (toque) is a type of knit cap.

Tuque may also refer to:

- Tuque Creek, Warren County, Missouri, USA; a creek
- La Tuque, Quebec, Canada (French: The Tuque); a city in Mauricie on the Saint-Maurice River
- El Tuque, Ponce, Puerto Rico (Spanish: The Tuque); a beach
- Tuque Games, a Canadian videogame developer

== See also ==
- La Tuque (disambiguation)
- Touques (disambiguation)
- Toque (disambiguation)
