= Daniel Whiteson =

American particle physicist (born 1975)

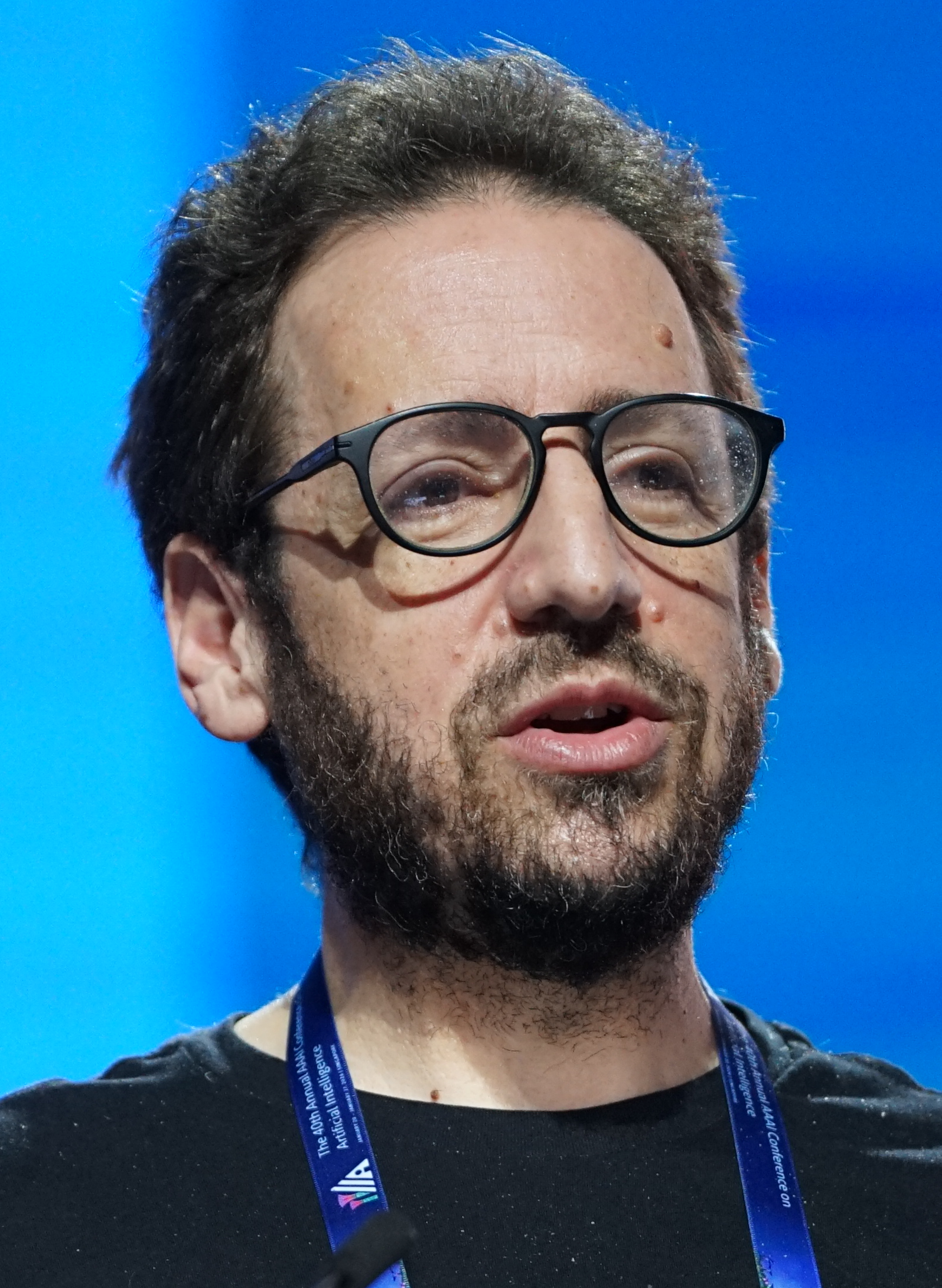
- Whiteson at AAAI 2026
- Born: Daniel Ofir Whiteson; June 17, 1975 (age 51)
- Citizenship: United States of America; United Kingdom
- Education: Rice University (BA, 1997); University of California, Berkeley (PhD, 2003)
- Spouse: Katrine Whiteson (m.)
- Scientific career
- Fields: Particle physics
- Workplaces: University of California, Irvine
- Thesis: Standard Model and Exotic Physics with Electrons and Muons at D0. (2003)
- Doctoral advisor: Mark Strovink
- Website: https://sites.uci.edu/daniel/

Daniel Ofir Whiteson (born June 17, 1975) is an American experimental particle physicist and professor of Physics and Astronomy at University of California, Irvine (UCI). He earned a bachelor's degree in physics and computer science from Rice University in 1997 and graduated with a PhD in physics from University of California, Berkeley in 2003. Whiteson joined the ATLAS experiment at CERN's Large Hadron Collider in 2007 and is a fellow of the American Physical Society. Whiteson is a co-creator of Elinor Wonders Why, an animated educational television show on PBS Kids. He co-hosts a podcast with biologist Kelly Weinersmith titled Daniel and Kelly's Extraordinary Universe.

== Early life and education ==
Daniel Ofir Whiteson was born on June 17, 1975. Whiteson graduated magna cum laude with a bachelor's degree in physics and computer science from Rice University in 1997 and received a PhD in physics from University of California, Berkeley in 2003.

== Career ==
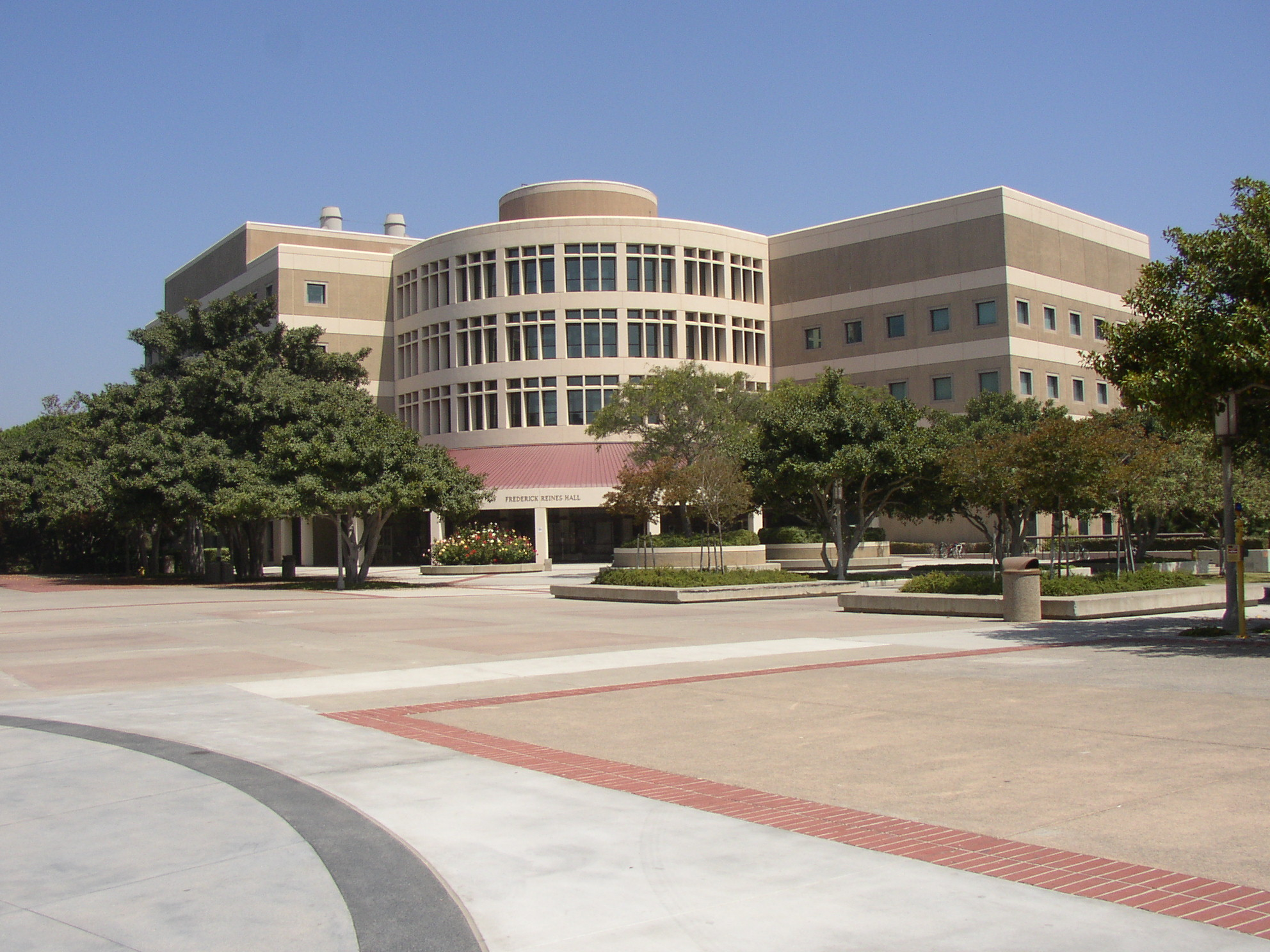
Frederick Reines Halls, which houses the Physics and Astronomy Department at UCI.

Whiteson is a professor of Physics and Astronomy at UCI. He is also the Vice-chair of the Department of Physics and Astronomy at UCI.

Whiteson is a particle physics researcher. In 2007, he joined the ATLAS experiment at CERN's Large Hadron Collider. Whiteson, along with other researchers, introduced an AI technique for high-dimensional statistical inference in ATLAS that allows for more precise measurement of the width of the Higgs boson.

In November 2013, Whiteson and Michael Mulhearn, a physicist at University of California, Davis, had the idea of using phones to detect ultra high energy cosmic rays. Whiteson and Mulhearn created an app called CRAYFIS, which stands for Cosmic Rays Found in Smartphones. The app uses the CMOS chip inside phone cameras to detect high energy particles left over by ultra high energy cosmic rays. This data is then analyzed to learn more about the cosmic ray that produced those high energy particles.

== Media ventures ==
In 2008, Whiteson started working with cartoonist Jorge Cham. Whiteson and Cham have written two books together, We Have No Idea: A Guide to the Unknown Universe in 2018 and Frequently Asked Questions About the Universe in 2021. Whiteson, along with Cham, is a co-creator of Elinor Wonders Why, an animated educational television show on PBS Kids. Whiteson chose PBS Kids specifically to reach the children of low-income families.

In September 2018, Whiteson and Cham debuted a science podcast called Daniel and Jorge Explain the Universe. The podcast ended in October 2024, and Whiteson started a new podcast called Daniel and Kelly's Extraordinary Universe, hosted by Whiteson and biologist Kelly Weinersmith.

Do Aliens Speak Physics? And Other Questions about Science and the Nature of Reality, a book by Whiteson and Andy Warner, was released in 2025. Warner is a cartoonist and illustrated the book.

== Awards and honors ==
Whiteson was elected a Fellow of the American Physical Society in 2016 for "leadership in searches for new physics and early studies of top quark mass and cross-section at the Tevatron Collider and Large Hadron Collider, both experimental and phenomenological, particularly searches for dark matter; for innovative applications of ideas from machine learning; and for nontraditional efforts in outreach."

In 2010, Whiteson was awarded a Sloan Research Fellowship.

== Personal life ==
He is married to Katrine Whiteson, an associate professor of molecular biology and biochemistry at UCI.

== Selected publications ==
=== Articles ===
- Carpenter, Linda M.; Nelson, Andrew; Shimmin, Chase; Tait, Timothy M. P.; Whiteson, Daniel (2013-04-05). "Collider searches for dark matter in events with a 𝑍 boson and missing energy". Physical Review D. 87 074005. arXiv:1212.3352. doi:10.1103/PhysRevD.87.074005.
- Carpenter, Linda; DiFranzo, Anthony; Mulhearn, Michael; Shimmin, Chase; Tulin, Sean; Whiteson, Daniel (2014-04-29). "Mono-Higgs-boson: A new collider probe of dark matter". Physical Review D. 89 (7) 075017. arXiv:1312.2592. Bibcode:2014PhRvD..89g5017C. doi:10.1103/PhysRevD.89.075017.
- Baldi, Pierre; Sadowski, Peter; Whiteson, Daniel (2014-07-02). "Searching for exotic particles in high-energy physics with deep learning". Nature Communications. 5 4308. arXiv:1402.4735. Bibcode:2014NatCo...5.4308B. doi:10.1038/ncomms5308. PMID 24986233.
- Baldi, Pierre; Cranmer, Kyle; Faucett, Taylor; Sadowski, Peter; Whiteson, Daniel (2016-04-27). "Parameterized neural networks for high-energy physics". European Physical Journal C. 76 (5) 235. arXiv:1601.07913. Bibcode:2016EPJC...76..235B. doi:10.1140/epjc/s10052-016-4099-4 – via Springer Nature Link.
- Guest, Daniel; Cranmer, Kyle; Whiteson, Daniel (2018). "Deep Learning and Its Application to LHC Physics". Annual Review of Nuclear and Particle Science. 68 (1): 161–181. arXiv:1806.11484. Bibcode:2018ARNPS..68..161G. doi:10.1146/annurev-nucl-101917-021019.

=== Books ===
- We Have No Idea: A Guide to the Unknown Universe. By Jorge Cham and Daniel Whiteson. New York City: Riverhead Books, 2017.
- Frequently Asked Questions About the Universe. By Jorge Cham and Daniel Whiteson. New York: Riverhead Books, 2021.
- Do Aliens Speak Physics? And Other Questions about Science and the Nature of Reality. By Daniel Whiteson and Andy Warner. W. W. Norton and Company, 2025.

== See also ==
- List of University of California, Berkeley alumni in science and technology
- List of University of California, Irvine people
