= Toque (disambiguation) =

A toque is any of a variety of hats.

Toque may also refer to:

- La Tuque, Quebec, a Canadian city
- Toques, Spain, Spanish municipality
- Flamenco guitar playing
- Toque, a ceremony or polyrhythmic composition using the Batá drum
- Toque, a ritual in the Candomblé religion
- Tuque (toque), a type of winter hat

== See also ==
- Toque-Toque Islands, São Sebastião, São Paulo, Brazil
- Tuque (disambiguation)
- Touques (disambiguation)
- Torque (disambiguation)
- Toke (disambiguation)
