= Frederik Holst =

Frederik Holst may refer to:

- Frederik Holst (physician) (1791–1871), Norwegian physician
- Frederik Holst (footballer) (born 1994), Danish footballer
