= Bengt Holst =

Danish biologist (born 1952)

- Born: 14 May 1952 (age 74)
- Education: University of Copenhagen
- Occupations: Chairman of the Danish Animal Ethics Council; Chairman of the Danish Nature Fund; Former Scientific Director of the Copenhagen Zoo
- Awards: Ulysses S. Seal Award for Innovation in Conservation (2021)

Bengt Holst (born 14 May 1952) is a Danish biologist who, until his retirement at the end of 2020, was scientific director at Copenhagen Zoo.

Holst received a MSc in biology from the University of Copenhagen in 1983. Thereafter, Holst was employed as a zoologist and research assistant at Copenhagen Zoo. In 1988, Holst became head of the animal department and in 1994 deputy director and scientific director.

Holst has participated in Denmark Radio's scientific radio programs Leksikon og Viden Om. In 2012, he became chairman of the Animal Ethics Council.

== Controversy ==
Holst gained prominence in February 2014 when he represented Copenhagen Zoo in both Danish and international media, explaining the decision to publicly autopsy the giraffe named Marius. Holst clarified that transferring Marius to another zoo might lead to gene concentration and inbreeding. To enhance genetic diversity for future offspring in zoo breeding programs, it was considered more valuable to introduce another giraffe with a diverse genetic makeup.

== Danish Nature Fund appointment ==
After retiring as Scientific Director of the Copenhagen Zoo on 31 December 2020, the Danish Minister of the Environment appointed Holst as the new chairman of the Danish Nature Fund.

== Written works ==
- Editor in chief, "Verdens Dyreliv – et illustreret opslagsværk om dyreriget" (2007). Forlaget Globe. ISBN 978-87-7900-621-8.
- Translation and adaptation into Danish, "Politikkens bog om pattedyr" (2003). "Politikkens forlag"
