= Hans Faye Holst =

Norwegian politician

Hans Faye Holst (10 February 1788 – 14 August 1843) was a Norwegian politician.

He was elected to the Norwegian Parliament in 1830, representing the constituency of Drammen. He worked as a merchant and consul in that city. He sat through only one term.
