= Piled Higher and Deeper =

Webcomic by Jorge Cham

- Author: Jorge Cham
- Website: http://www.phdcomics.com
- Current status/schedule: Last published in 2021
- Launch date: October 27, 1997
- Genre(s): Academia, doctoral research

A PhD Comics special on the occasion of Open Access Week 2012

Piled Higher and Deeper (also known as PhD Comics) is a discontinued newspaper and webcomic strip produced from 1997 to 2021. The series was written and drawn by Jorge Cham, and follows the lives of several grad students. First published in 1997 when Cham was a grad student himself at Stanford University, the strip deals with issues of life in graduate school, including the difficulties of scientific research, the perils of procrastination, and the complex student–supervisor relationship. As of 2017, the strip's website had 6 million visitors in the previous year.

== History ==
Piled Higher and Deeper was first published in The Stanford Daily, the student newspaper at Stanford University, in October 1997. The newspaper had put out a call for comics and Cham, a student and teaching assistant at the time, discussed ideas for comics with his brother and friends. Cham's brother, Jaime, suggested there should be a comic about grad school "because that's when the real pain begins". Cham had no formal art training and had never tried drawing comics before but his comic was accepted. Cham created the website a few weeks later. Cham continued the strip while completing his PhD and later while an instructor in mechanical engineering at Caltech, then in July 2005 left this work to become a full-time cartoonist.

Originally, the strip was drawn in black-and-white, eventually became grayscale, and finally became color in June 2004.

The archive of the strip are available for free online. The strip was also syndicated free to student newspapers, with Cham earning a living through book sales, merchandise, and giving lectures.

== Themes ==
The title of the comic comes from an old joke about becoming a Ph.D., which explains that "B.S." stands for "bullshit", "M.S." stands for "More of the Same" (or "More Shit"), and "Ph.D." stands for "Piled Higher and Deeper".

The comic follows the lives of graduate students and their professors. Reviewer Sara Coelho said "the comic deals with everyday frustrations of life in the lab – procrastination, dealing with advisers, serving on committees, lack of inspiration". Comics deal with the isolation of graduate work.

Cham's comics have also been on real-world research, such as a five-comic series following a visit to CERN.

== Characters ==
Piled Higher and Deeper introduced its main characters early in its run, and their personalities have remained fairly constant during the strip's several years of publication. In the strip's first few seasons, the characters were clearly Stanford University students, though the number of school-specific references and jokes has decreased since.

Cham has said that while the characters are not based on real people, he was inspired by colleagues, classmates, and his brother's friends.

=== Students ===
- The Nameless Grad Student (a.k.a., The Nameless Hero) – a graduate student in engineering, this bespectacled protagonist has procrastinated through the entire strip without receiving a name. He looks similar to comic strip author, Jorge Cham and is modelled after him (at one point, the younger sister of the character, Dee, remarks that her brother has dreams of quitting grad school and becoming a cartoonist). Cham chose to make the character nameless as "when you're a graduate student, professors never remember your name."
  Little is known about the hero's background, although early on Mike Slackenerny states that he knew the hero's older brother (who quit his PhD and went on to work for a "Silicon Valley Company"). As he is seen playing with two children at home during his winter vacation, he probably has younger siblings, nieces and/or nephews, or cousins. He has been increasingly seen with a set group of friends (one is named Mikkel) and seems, at least marginally, to be the most favored graduate student of his advisor, Prof. Smith. At the conclusion of the film, the character states for the first time that his name is Winston, named after Jorge's father; in the films, Winston is a biochemistry grad student.
- Cecilia – A geeky engineering student born around May 1, 1980, (Note: Cecilia turned 25 in 2005: Jorge Cham, Birthday 2005, Piled Higher and Deeper, archived from the original on December 30, 2010; Cham, Scooped!, p. 12.) though earlier strips have her born in 1973. (Note: Cecilia went to her 10 year high school reunion in 2001: Jorge Cham (November 14, 2001), High School Reunion, Piled Higher and Deeper, archived from the original on September 24, 2011; Cham, Scooped!, p. 12.) Cecilia spent years refusing to admit that she was truly a geek at heart. However, in one strip she finally with hesitation admitted she is indeed a geek. She is also a programmer as well. Addicted to chocolate and cookies, she has long since taken enough classes and conducted enough research to graduate, but a mysterious psychological force keeps her in school. She stated in an interview for a project by her friend Tajel that her father was a professor, a "great teacher", something that may or may not be a motivation for her to go above and beyond (also, her choice of words indicates that her father may have died). During class, she deliberately wears frumpy clothes to discourage male interest, since the vast majority of her classmates are men. This strategy is not always successful – "Excuse me, female, will you marry me?" (Note: Jorge Cham (June 6, 2005), Dress to repress, Piled Higher and Deeper, archived from the original on October 4, 2007; Cham, Scooped!, p. 14.) She has had two boyfriends in the course of the strip: David and Scott. Although she broke up with David relatively quickly, she seriously dated Scott, her crush in high school, for numerous strips; (Note: Jorge Cham (May 8, 2006), Friday night, Piled Higher and Deeper, archived from the original on October 8, 2007; Cham, Scooped!, p. 67.) they had a long-distance relationship for a while after Scott was promoted and moved to London (Note: Jorge Cham (May 18, 2006), Long distance, Piled Higher and Deeper, archived from the original on October 7, 2007; Cham, Scooped!, p. 69.) but broke up amicably in 2007. (Note: Jorge Cham (March 30, 2007), Is this it?, Piled Higher and Deeper, archived from the original on October 7, 2007; Cham, Scooped!, p. 130.) Cecilia sometimes accompanies Tajel to political rallies and such events. She was asked in 2006 by a professor to interview for a faculty position at a different institution because "it's the only position you're not overqualified for" (Note: Jorge Cham (January 31, 2006), Faculty position, Piled Higher and Deeper, archived from the original on October 4, 2007; Cham, Scooped!, p. 53.) and "we hired one of their grad students, so, diplomatically, they owe us." (Note: Jorge Cham (February 5, 2006), Faculty position, Piled Higher and Deeper, archived from the original on October 9, 2007; Cham, Scooped!, p. 53.)
- Michael Slackenerny – phenomenally lazy, endlessly devious, and remarkably clever, Mike did his undergraduate at Berkeley yet had been in graduate school for longer than anyone can remember (during one of his interviews it was strongly implied that he started grad school in the 1980s), surviving on ramen and free food from various events on campus. He views grad school not as a place but as "a state of mind [...] preferably sleeping". In the spring of 1998, he drove to Las Vegas with a seemingly foolproof plan to beat the blackjack tables, thereby winning enough money to solve Stanford's housing crisis. Instead, he returned with a wife, Jen, who remained an unseen character for some time. Jen became pregnant with their daughter Sophy (Note: Jorge Cham (January 23, 2006), Paternity leave, Piled Higher and Deeper, archived from the original on October 11, 2007; Cham, Scooped!, p. 51.) and stayed that way for several years, constantly urging Michael to finish his thesis and graduate. Michael finally completed his doctoral defense in 2005 – Jen went into labor just before his presentation began – but did not finish writing his thesis until 2007. After submitting his dissertation, Mike was seen walking home and asking himself, "Now what?" (Note: Jorge Cham (April 2, 2007), Now what?, Piled Higher and Deeper, archived from the original on October 13, 2007; Cham, Scooped!, p. 131.) After a period of job-hunting, he was finally hired by Prof. Smith as a postdoc.
- Tajel – an anthropologist and the lone social scientist in the main cast. She was Cecilia's roommate before getting married. She is a dedicated activist who frequently attends or organizes rallies. Her frustration with American politics is exacerbated by her not being a United States citizen. She is conversant in Spanish. Her mother is Indian and her father is Caucasian. She married Dr. Khumalo in February 2009.
- Gerard – the strip's newest "official" character, he is a major in Medieval Scandinavian Cultural Philosophy, who was personally introduced to readers by Tajel, supposedly in response to numerous letters from Humanities majors requesting their own character, and was meant to provide jokes on "obscure manuscripts, dead languages, and being the lowest paid grads on campus. Also, political correctness!" Despite this, Gerard has only been shown twice after his initial introduction, apart from a cameo as a guest at Tajel's wedding, in a joke on the obscurity and uselessness of his field. His first actual storyline within the comic occurs when he is informed that funding has been cut for humanities majors and to leave the strip or find a more useful major, subsequently forcing him to justify why the comic should retain a humanities character.
- Dee – the hero's younger sister. She is an undergraduate student who has been seen taking the GRE. She also talks on her cellular telephone, eats quite a bit, and naps during class when she is not doing something even more inappropriate, such as chatting or eating a full meal during a test. Dee once phones her "sister dearest", so the main character may have more than one sibling. Dee has a good male friend who she often spends time with and at one point hints that he may have romantic feelings for her. Like the main character, he has not yet been named.
- Mariko – a Japanese student in the same research field as the hero, she visits Prof. Smith's lab in 1998. Smith assigns her to work with "whoever is lowest in the lab hierarchy", which turns out to be the hero. During her brief stay, she inspires in him a powerful unrequited affection, which he maintains for at least three years. She eventually quits her Ph.D. and starts her own company, at which the hero works briefly. She is still occasionally seen talking with the main character as he works, so her current status is somewhat murky. On a strip dated 28 April 2010, entitled "Lost no more..?", she was seen in an alternate timeline as possibly being the mother of the Nameless Hero's (supposed) baby, with the Nameless Hero asking "WHAT IF I HAD STAYED IN ACADEMIA?"
- Steve (aka. Golden Boy) – Remarkably clever, sincere and "good boy". Steve has been in graduate school for two years and has already completed his thesis. In the lab hierarchy he is given more consideration than any of the post docs or research associates by Prof. Smith. He is extremely good in getting positive results and is always consulted by Prof. Smith for his opinion. His "good boy" image in comparison to the nameless hero is a running joke in the series.
- Allison – The sole female PhD student in Professor Smith's lab, which Smith and the other PhDs often forget to Allison's frustration. Unlike her labmates, she is not distracted by sporting events like the World Cup and proves to have some measure of athletic ability during the students vs. professors baseball match.

=== Faculty ===
- Professor Jones – Cecilia's research advisor; a typical graduate school professor, although seemingly older and kinder than Prof. Smith. He is clueless in giving Cecilia advice on non-research related topics such as her love life and future career, and will ask for her help with small tasks such as changing the font size of footnotes, claiming it is urgent. Apparently the only reason he has time to see his wife is because he married his administrative assistant; before he received tenure, he had already been divorced three times. He has a daughter in 1st grade named Shelley, (Note: Jorge Cham (July 4, 2005), Cingradella, Piled Higher and Deeper, archived from the original on October 11, 2007; Cham, Scooped!, p. 20.) who is intelligent enough to fix Mike's work for him.
- Dr. Patrick Khumalo – An adjunct professor in the Anthropology Department's faculty, whom Tajel eventually marries. Tajel mistakes him for a first-year grad student when they first meet, possibly because she is older than he is.
- Professor Rivera – Tajel's advisor. He apparently takes a laid-back approach to being an advisor, being entirely clueless as to Tajel's research interests, progress, and sometimes even her name. Once he praised a draft of a paper that Tajel had written, three months after Tajel had already submitted the final paper on due date. Additionally, he is extremely elusive when needed, such as when Cecilia needed to find him for documents to allow Tajel to renew her visa, appearing only when Cecilia tried imagining he was the last person she wanted to see. He is married to Professor Stein, the chair of the anthropology department. Despite being aware that he lacks any apparent interest in Tajel's work, she is still stunned when he leaves for a position at another university with only an offer of advising her remotely.
- Professor Galvez – The head of the anthropology department, who becomes Tajel's new advisor after discussion with the rest of the faculty. In contrast to Rivera, Galvez apparently has a surly personality and finds Tajel's emails to be too lengthy to bother reading.
- Professor Brian S. Smith (Note: The fact that his first name is Brian is reflected in Jorge Cham (June 20, 2001), Lil' sister, Piled Higher and Deeper, archived from the original on December 30, 2010 and Jorge Cham (December 20, 2005), A Smithmas carol, Piled Higher and Deeper, archived from the original on October 7, 2011; Cham, Scooped!, p. 45.) – Mostly intimidating and unsympathetic but sometimes forgetful, Prof. Smith advises Mike Slackenerny and the Nameless Hero in their research, taking credit for any output his lab actually produces. Prof. Smith occasionally tries to "fit in" with his students (nearly all males and one female student, Allison), to humorous and awkward results. He has a wife and two children, a daughter named Sadie, and a son, "Junior". (Note: Jorge Cham (August 2, 2006), Conference call, Piled Higher and Deeper, archived from the original on October 8, 2007; Cham, Scooped!, p. 81.) However, as a grad student, Prof. Smith (then known simply as "Brian") fell in love with a fellow grad student in the same lab, Sangeeta Singh, whose work he greatly admired. Tragically, Brian ignored Sangeeta's advances in order to work overtime on his thesis, even turning down her invitation to a holiday party. Prof. Smith regretted it for the rest of his life, consoling himself many years later by saying to himself, "who cares, I've got tenure". The second PhD Movie elaborates on this further, showing Sangeeta's fate after young Brian stupidly missed the opportunity of a lifetime with her: decades later, Sangeeta is a professor herself and one of Prof. Smith's leading rivals in his field. But even then, it is clear that Prof. Smith never got over her. When she encounters him at a scientific conference, taunting his work, he has no wits to reply and can only stare longingly at her, until she finally snaps him out of his trance. It is unclear whether she still harbors a buried affection for him in return. Prof. Smith's current wife presumably hopes not. Prof. Smith was originally drawn so that his face was never seen, much like Ernst Stavro Blofeld in the early James Bond movies, Doctor Claw in Inspector Gadget, or any teacher/adult in Peanuts. According to his wife, Smith apparently "used to goof off all the time as a grad student" and it has been suggested on occasion that he had been interested in becoming a circus performer rather than a professor. A brilliant academic who disproved all the theories of his advisor Professor Emeritus Zekowsky, (Note: Jorge Cham (December 8, 2005), A Smithmas carol, Piled Higher and Deeper, archived from the original on December 29, 2010; Cham, Scooped!, p. 43.) Professor Smith is the Arthur C. and Caroline J. McCallister Distinguished Chair Professor and Anderson Faculty Scholar, and the Director of the Center for Computational Research and the National Institute of Dynamical Physics. He is the recipient of the Alexander von Humboldt Prize of the Netherlands, the National Science Foundation Presidential Investigator Award, the Exceptional Achievement Medal from the International Society of Engineers, the Pi Gamma Tau Industry Excellence Professorship, the National Medal of Engineering, and the Medal of Honor from the Royal Academy of Scientists. He serves on the editorial board of the Journal of Advanced Dynamics, the Journal of Nano-Particle Computation, Physik-Publication and several other journals, and on the advisory boards of many industry consortia. He holds honorary doctorates from the Universidad Politécnica de Madrid, Tsing-Chua Beijing University and the University of São Paulo, among others. (Note: Jorge Cham (August 16, 2005), Author biographies, Piled Higher and Deeper, archived from the original on October 4, 2007; Cham, Scooped!, p. 85.)
- Professor Sangeeta Singh – Prof. Smith's ex-labmate when he was a grad student himself, and now his greatest rival, Prof. Singh is featured solely in "The PHD Movie 2", although she was seen in Prof. Smith's flashbacks during the "A Smithmas Carol" storyline.

== Parodies ==
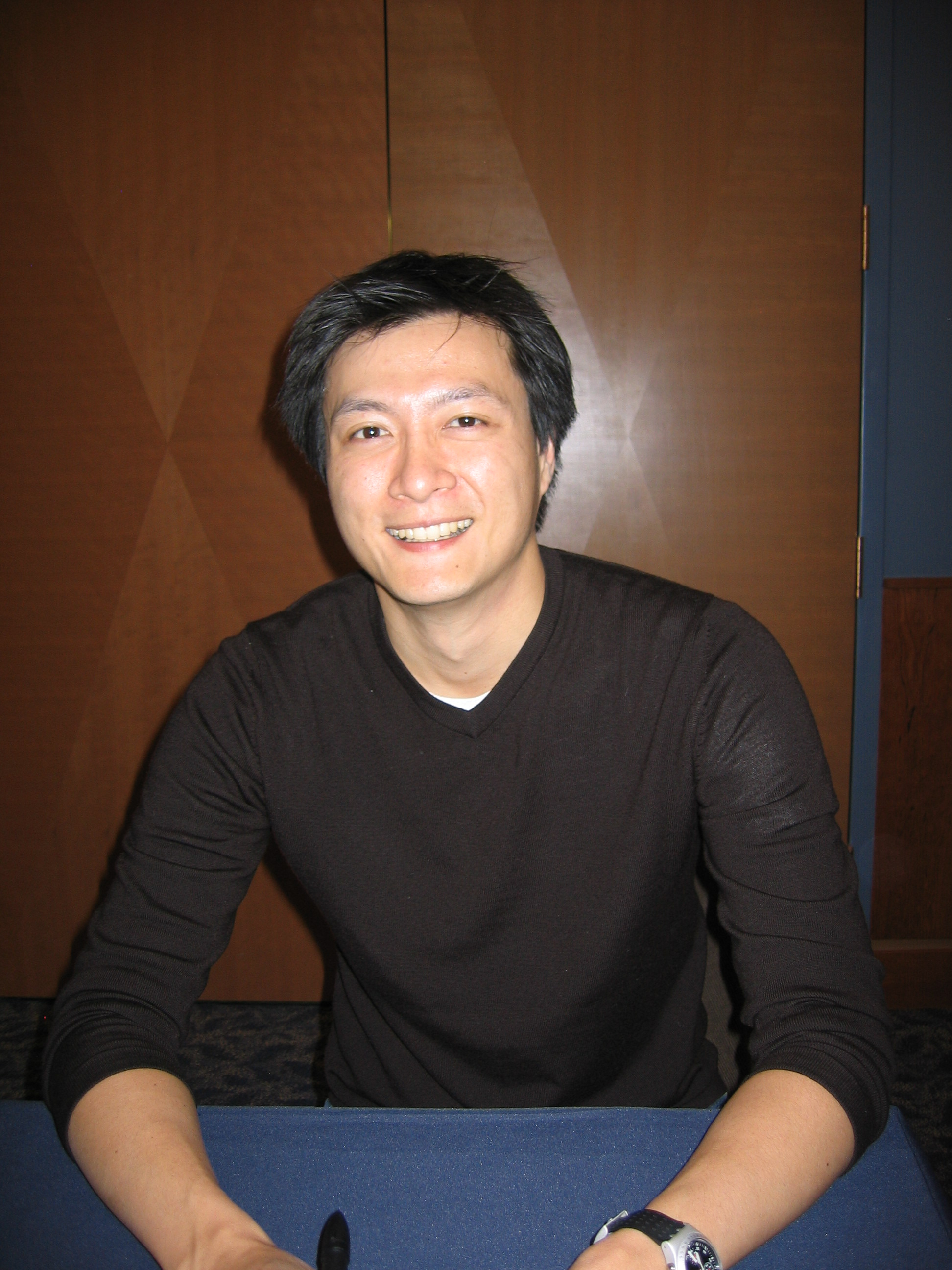
Jorge Cham after his "Power of Procrastination" talk at UIUC, March 8, 2007

One of Cham's recurring themes is to re-cast an item of popular culture in the grad-school milieu. Upon several occasions, the strip has included spoofs of popular movies, like The Thesis (The Matrix), Raiders of the Lost Dissertation (Raiders of the Lost Ark), I, Grad Student (a mixture of the book and movie I, Robot), and Summer days ("Summer Nights"). In addition, Cham has parodied television programs like The Jerry Springer Show, among others.

Jorge Cham has also parodied Newton's laws of motion as Newton's 3 Laws of Graduation. According to the strip these laws of graduation were superseded by Einstein's Special Theory of Research Inactivity, much as Newton's actual laws were superseded by Einstein's Special Theory of Relativity.

Another series of strips takes up the modern debate about the proper use of the term "irony".

The strip has also included several adaptations of Shakespeare as well as several propaganda posters. Captions for the latter include "This man does research for you!", "When you procrastinate... Someone is watching!" and "Women in grad school... Support your local female geek."

Cham has also released two song parodies, purportedly sung by Tajel, in MP3 format: "Closer to fine" (cf. Indigo Girls) and "Who will grade your work" ("Who Will Save Your Soul").

== Reception ==
The comic resonated with graduate students. As of 2011, the strip's website had received 7 million visitors in the previous year, and a 2017 article reported that it received 6 million visitors a year. As of 2009, Cham had sold more than 46,000 books.

== Books ==
Six PhD comic books were published. These are collections of the PHD Comic strips, and some books also contain bonus material:

- Piled Higher and Deeper: A Graduate Comic Strip Collection (2002), contains production sketches and an afterword by the character Prof. Smith in addition to the comic strips.
- Life is Tough and then You Graduate (2005) contains six strips not published online that explain what happened in Mike's thesis defense. It also has a foreword by Karl Marx, behind-the-scenes author notes and a graduate school board game.
- Scooped! (2007) also contains "Tales from the Road", a series of comics that detail Cham's experiences whilst giving his Power of Procrastination tour.
- Academic Stimulus Package (2009) was printed in full color.
- Adventures in Thesisland (2012) was also printed in full color. The introduction is an excerpt from the screenplay of the PHD Movie.
- The PHD Comics 20th Anniversary Collection (2019) includes essays by Cham.

== Movie adaptations ==
=== The PHD Movie ===
In March 2011, Jorge Cham started filming a movie based on the comic series. The film production was a collaboration between Cham and a theater group at the California Institute of Technology. In fall 2011, the film was released on selected academic campuses. A trailer of the movie was released to the Piled Higher and Deeper website on June 8, 2011. After about a year of various campus screenings around the world, the movie became available for purchase on DVD or streaming on April 15, 2012. A columnist for Nature wrote: "the film puts the plight of the PhD student on the big screen, giving student audiences a chance to laugh at themselves... the film tackles some of the negative aspects of pursuing a PhD and a science career... The PhD Movie raises a question that crosses many students' minds: why bother? The answer it provides resonates with the audience: Everybody is here because they want to be here ... You have to embrace the things you're passionate about.'"

=== The PHD Movie 2: Still in Grad School ===
The sequel to the first movie was shot in the Caltech campus. The budget of $163,000 was provided by Kickstarter backers. It was released in September 2015; the comedy relates to a research team seeking a key molecule in a cutthroat environment for jobs and grants.

== Lectures ==
Cham gives lectures based on his comic. A 2009 article wrote that "the popularity of his keynote lectures... are enough to make even the most distinguished professor green with envy." His first lecture was at Massachusetts Institute of Technology in 2005 and was entitled "The Power of Procrastination".

== Bibliography ==
- Cham, Jorge (2002), Piled Higher and Deeper: A Graduate Comic Strip Collection, Palo Alto, Calif.: Piled Higher and Deeper Publishing, ISBN 978-0-9721695-0-9.
- Cham, Jorge (2005), Life is Tough and then You Graduate, Los Angeles, Calif.: Piled Higher & Deeper Publishing, ISBN 978-0-9721695-2-3.
- Cham, Jorge (2007), Scooped!: The Third Piled Higher & Deeper Comic Strip Collection, Los Angeles, Calif.: Piled Higher & Deeper, LLC, ISBN 978-0-9721695-3-0.
- Cham, Jorge (2009), Academic Stimulus Package: The Fourth Piled Higher & Deeper Comic Strip Collection, Los Angeles, Calif.: Piled Higher & Deeper, LLC, ISBN 978-0-9721695-4-7.
- Cham, Jorge (2012), Adventures in Thesisland: The Fifth Piled Higher and Deeper Comic Strip Collection, Palo Alto, Calif.: Piled Higher and Deeper Publishing, ISBN 978-0-9721695-5-4.

=== About ===
- Schuman, Jamie (August 12, 2005), "Dawdling and doodling", The Chronicle of Higher Education.
- Smaglik, Paul (August 2005), "You've got to laugh ..", Nature, 436 (7051): 745, doi:10.1038/nj7051-745a, S2CID 4329881.
