= Jorge Cham =

Panamaian-born cartoonist (born 1976)

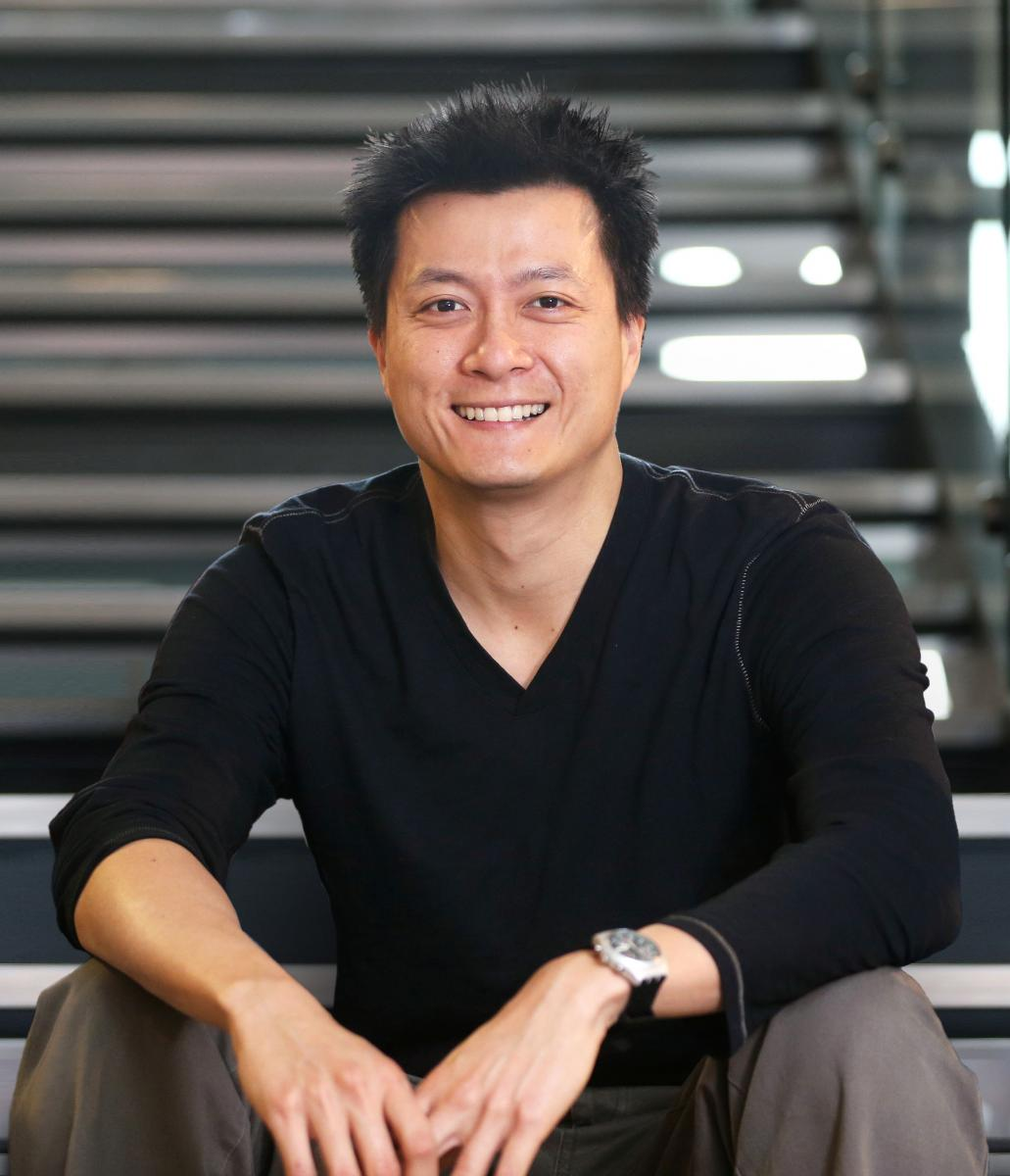
- Cham in 2018
- Born: Jorge Gabriel Cham; May 1976 (age 50); Bocas Town, Bocas del Toro, Panama
- Education: Georgia Institute of Technology (B.S.); Stanford University (PhD)
- Known for: Cartoon work - Piled Higher and Deeper; Podcast - Daniel and Jorge Explain the Universe
- Scientific career
- Thesis: On performance and stability in open-loop running (2002)
- Doctoral advisor: Mark Cutkosky
- Website: jorgecham.com

A PhD Comics special on the occasion of Open Access Week 2012

Jorge Gabriel Cham (Spanish: [ˈxorxe]) (born 1976) is an engineer-turned cartoonist, writer and producer, who writes the web comic strip Piled Higher and Deeper (PhD Comics). Cham was born in Panama and lives in the United States, where he started drawing PhD Comics as a graduate student at Stanford University. He has since been syndicated in several university newspapers and in six published book collections. He was featured on NPR on December 20, 2010. With physicist Daniel Whiteson, he is the coauthor of We Have No Idea (2017), a book about unsolved problems in physics. In September 2018, Cham and Whiteson debuted the podcast Daniel and Jorge Explain the Universe, produced by iHeartMedia, in which the hosts aim to explain popular questions and complex topics about science, technology, and the universe, in the simplest way possible. In October 2024 the podcast ended as co-hosts Whiteson and Cham decided to pursue separate projects.

Cham co-created the PBS Kids animated series Elinor Wonders Why, which premiered in September 2020.

== Early life and education ==
Jorge Cham was born and raised in Panama to parents working in the Panama Canal Zone as engineers for the United States Government. He received his B.S. from Georgia Institute of Technology in 1997, and earned a PhD in mechanical engineering from Stanford University. He previously worked at Caltech as an instructor and as a researcher on neural prosthetics. He has now fully devoted to his comic work.

== Cartoonist ==
In 2005, Cham became a full time cartoonist and began an invited speaking tour of major universities delivering his talk titled "The Power of Procrastination". To date, he has given hundreds of lectures worldwide. In this lecture, Cham talks about his experiences creating the comic strip and examines the sources of grad students' anxieties. He also explores the guilt and the myths associated with procrastination and argues that in many cases it is actually a good thing.

In 2012, Cham wrote and produced The PHD Movie, an independent feature-length film based on his comics. The film featured real researchers and academics and was screened at over 500 universities and research centers worldwide. In 2015, Cham wrote and produced The PHD Movie: Still in Grad School, a sequel to the first film, which also screened worldwide. He also illustrated the book Scientific Paper Writing: A Survival Guide (2015) by Bodil Holst.

Cham has also had six collections of his comics published, with the most recent one — a 20th-anniversary edition — backed by more than $234,000 in pledges on Kickstarter.

His book We Have No Idea: A Guide to the Unknown Universe, with physicist Daniel Whiteson, has been translated to over 23 languages, was a Der Spiegel Best-seller, and was awarded the Wen Jin National Book Award in China.

Cham is also the co-creator of Elinor Wonders Why, a show on PBS Kids that is based on Cham's daughter. The series premiered on September 7, 2020. He is the co-owner of Shoe Ink, which produces the Elinor Wonders Why series and That's So Interesting, a live-action short form series hosted by Cham and featuring 3 characters from Elinor Wonders Why itself being Olive, Ari & Elinor.
