= Touques =

Touques can refer to:

- Touques, Calvados, a commune of the Calvados département, in northern France
- Touques (river), a small coastal river in Normandy, France,
- the plural form of touque, a regional variation of tuque/toque (a knitted hat, usually made of wool).

== See also ==
- Toque (disambiguation)
- Tuque (disambiguation)
