= Bodil Holst =

Danish physicist

Bodil Holst is a Danish-Norwegian physicist known for her work on nanoscale imaging, 2D material characterisation and mask based lithography using molecular beams. Other research areas include smart surfaces and plant fibre identification. She is CEO of the company Lace Lithography and affiliated professor in the Department of Physics and Technology at the University of Bergen in Norway.

== Education and career ==
Holst studied physics and mathematics at the University of Copenhagen. In 1997, she earned a doctorate at the University of Cambridge. She continued as a postdoctoral researcher at the Max Planck Institute for Fluid Dynamics in Göttingen, Germany and at the Graz University of Technology in Austria. On the verge of giving up her academic career, she came to the University of Bergen in 2007, funded by a recruitment grant from the Trond Mohn Foundation. Since 2023 she is CEO of the company Lace Lithography, which she founded together with her former PhD student Adria Salvador Palau.

== Books ==
Bodil Holst is the author of the self-published book Scientific Paper Writing: A Survival Guide (2015), illustrated by Jorge Cham. With Gianangelo Bracco, she is the co-editor of the book Surface Science Techniques (Springer, 2013).

== Recognition ==
2025 Awarded The Research Council of Norway's Innovation Award
2023 Elected to the Norwegian Academy of Science and Letters
2019 Appointed Chair of the Kavli Prize Committee in Nanoscience for the period 2019-2024.
2018 Elected to the Norwegian Academy of Technological Sciences
2015 Elected to the Royal Norwegian Society of Sciences and Letters
2008 Elected to the International Union of Pure and Applied Physics Commission on Symbols, Units, Nomenclature, Atomic Masses and Fundamental Constants for the period 2008–2011 and re-elected in 2011 for the period 2011-2014
2007 Trond Mohn Research Foundation Recruitment Grant
2000 Alexander von Humboldt Foundation Fellowship
1999 Marie Skłodowska-Curie Actions Research Fellowship
