= Lydia Bourouiba =

Biophysicist

- Education: McGill University
- Scientific career
- Workplaces: Massachusetts Institute of Technology; York University
- Thesis: Numerical and theoretical study of homogeneous rotating turbulence (2008)
- Website: Bourouiba Group

External videos
- The dynamics of disease transmission, Lydia Bourouiba, MIT School of Engineering, Dec 7, 2018
- “How diseases and epidemics move through a breath of air”, Lydia Bourouiba, TedMed Talk, 2018
- "Turbulent Gas Clouds and Respiratory Pathogen Emissions", JAMA, March 26, 2020

Lydia Bourouiba is an Esther and Harold E. Edgerton Professor, an Associate Professor in the Civil and Environmental Engineering and Mechanical Engineering departments, and in the Institute for Medical Engineering and Science at the Massachusetts Institute of Technology. She is also a Harvard-MIT Health Sciences and Technology Faculty, and Affiliate Faculty of Harvard Medical School. She directs the Fluid Dynamics of Disease Transmission Laboratory at MIT.

Bourouiba's research considers the fluid dynamics of disease transmission. Her work has overturned previous conventional thinking about sneezes and disease transmission. Bourouiba studies respiratory pathogen emissions, work that has significant implications for the COVID-19 pandemic and for limiting transmission of the coronavirus disease and future pandemics. She was elected a Fellow of the American Physical Society in 2021.

== Early life and education ==
In 2008, Bourouiba completed her graduate research at McGill University, Canada, where she developed a theoretical description of turbulence fluid flow, after majoring in mathematics and physics in her undergraduate studies. After completing her doctorate, she joined the Department of Mathematics at MIT. There she started to concentrate on coughs and sneezes; "violent expiratory events". She believed that rooting her epidemiological studies in physics and fluid mechanics would allow her to understand the spread of emerging infectious diseases, including SARS and Ebola virus disease. She also worked in Toronto at the Centre for Disease Modelling where she modelled the spread of influenza.

== Research and career ==
Bourouiba uses mathematical modelling to understand the spread of disease. After her early work in the modelling and theoretical aspects of expiratory events, when she joined Massachusetts Institute of Technology in 2010, she became interested in the size distribution of exhaled droplets. Bourouiba established a new laboratory at Massachusetts Institute of Technology, the Fluid Dynamics of Disease Transmission Laboratory, that combines fluid dynamics with epidemiological modelling. It includes at biosafety level 2 laboratory, which permits the study of the sneezes of healthy patients as well as those with influenza.

In 2016, Bourouiba used two high-speed video cameras to show the movement of fluid droplets that spread from a sneeze. The cameras were set up to collect thousands of frames per second, which facilitated the study of the sneezes in slow motion. High-speed video footage of more than 100 sneezes allowed Bourouiba to analyse the 150 millisecond long moments during which a sneeze is expelled into the air. Her videos showed that sneezes, exhalations, and coughs consist of mucosalivary droplets that are primarily made of a multi-phase gas cloud. This gas cloud grows as it moves away from the mouth, drawing in air from the surrounding environment. She showed that the fluid sheet of droplets balloons then evolves into long filaments and eventually disperses as a spray of smaller droplets.

This complex fluid cascade was not as simple as models that had previously been used to model coughs and sneezes, and showed that the spread of droplets could be strongly impacted by environmental temperature and humidity. The conditions within the turbulent gas cloud can extend the lifetime of the enclosed droplets. These turbulent gas clouds were shown to protect the droplets as they move through the air, and the internal climate of the cloud was shown to extend the lifetime of the enclosed droplets. Bourouiba demonstrated that exhalation can reach speeds of 10 – 30 ms^{−1}, which means that droplets bearing pathogens can travel up to eight metres. Eventually, the pathogen bearing droplets within these turbulent clouds evaporate, leaving behind a spray of residue and droplet nuclei. The residues can survive in the air for hours, eventually following the air flow that is imposed by climate control systems. Bourouiba believes that this analysis can better inform public health interventions, as well as identify people who may act as super-spreaders.

During the COVID-19 pandemic, Bourouiba has applied her models of sneezes to SARS-CoV-2, to help to understand and slow the spread of the disease. Early reports from China indicated that particles of the virus were found in the hospital rooms of patients who were infected with the disease. She has argued that the guidance given by the World Health Organization (WHO) and Centers for Disease Control (CDC) may underestimate the distances required for safe social distancing as they do not take into account the dynamics of the turbulent puff cloud. Alongside improving estimations of 'safe' distances, Bourouiba has looked to understand the efficacy of face masks during the COVID-19 pandemic.

Bourouiba founded the first international Fluids and Health Conference in 2019. The conference will become a Gordon Research Conference as of 2022.

Her research on sneezes formed the basis of educational materials produced by Science Friday.

== Awards ==
In 2021, Bourouiba was elected as a Fellow of the American Physical Society in the Division of Fluid Dynamics for her work in quantitatively elucidating the mechanisms of droplet impact and fragmentation and for pioneering a new field at the intersection of fluid dynamics and transmission of respiratory and foodborne pathogens with clear and tangible contributions to public health.

The Bourouiba Group received the Tse Cheuk Ng Tai Prize for Innovative Research in Health Sciences in 2014. Bourouiba has also received the Smith Family Foundation Odyssey Award for high-risk/high-reward basic science research in 2018, and the Ole Madsen Mentoring Award in 2019.

== Personal life ==
Bourouiba spent part of her childhood in Algeria, during the Algerian Civil War, and also lived in France. Alongside her research, Bourouiba takes part in mountain climbing and long bicycle rides.

== Selected publications ==
- L. Bourouiba. Healthy Teaching Recommendations: In-person teaching in times of COVID-19, Summer 2021, healthy-teaching.org, doi:10.5281/zenodo.5228800.
- Bourouiba, Lydia (13 July 2021). "Fluid Dynamics of Respiratory Infectious Diseases". Annual Review of Biomedical Engineering. 23 (1): 547–577. doi:10.1146/annurev-bioeng-111820-025044. hdl:1721.1/131115. ISSN 1523-9829. PMID 34255991. S2CID 235823756.
- Bourouiba, Lydia (5 January 2021). "The Fluid Dynamics of Disease Transmission". Annual Review of Fluid Mechanics. 53 (1): 473–508. Bibcode:2021AnRFM..53..473B. doi:10.1146/annurev-fluid-060220-113712. ISSN 0066-4189. S2CID 225114407.
- Bourouiba, Lydia (12 May 2020). "Turbulent Gas Clouds and Respiratory Pathogen Emissions: Potential Implications for Reducing Transmission of COVID-19". JAMA. 323 (18): 1837–1838. doi:10.1001/jama.2020.4756. ISSN 0098-7484. PMID 32215590. S2CID 214680715.
- Bahl, Prateek; Doolan, Con; de Silva, Charitha; Chughtai, Abrar Ahmad; Bourouiba, Lydia; MacIntyre, C Raina (16 April 2020). "Airborne or Droplet Precautions for Health Workers Treating Coronavirus Disease 2019?". The Journal of Infectious Diseases. 225 (9): 1561–1568. doi:10.1093/infdis/jiaa189. ISSN 0022-1899. PMC 7184471. PMID 32301491.
- Weitz, Joshua S; Stock, Charles A; Wilhelm, Steven W; Bourouiba, Lydia; Coleman, Maureen L; Buchan, Alison; Follows, Michael J; Fuhrman, Jed A; Jover, Luis F; Lennon, Jay T; Middelboe, Mathias (2015-01-30). "A multitrophic model to quantify the effects of marine viruses on microbial food webs and ecosystem processes". The ISME Journal. 9 (6): 1352–1364. Bibcode:2015ISMEJ...9.1352W. doi:10.1038/ismej.2014.220. ISSN 1751-7362. PMC 4438322. PMID 25635642.
- Bourouiba, Lydia; Dehandschoewercker, Eline; Bush, John W. M. (2014). "Violent expiratory events: on coughing and sneezing". Journal of Fluid Mechanics. 745: 537–563. Bibcode:2014JFM...745..537B. doi:10.1017/jfm.2014.88. hdl:1721.1/101386. ISSN 0022-1120. S2CID 2102358.
- Bourouiba, Lydia; Bartello, Peter (2007-08-31). "The intermediate Rossby number range and two-dimensional–three-dimensional transfers in rotating decaying homogeneous turbulence". Journal of Fluid Mechanics. 587: 139–161. Bibcode:2007JFM...587..139B. doi:10.1017/s0022112007007124. hdl:1721.1/86304. ISSN 0022-1120. S2CID 18943507.
