= Toke Holst =

Danish handball player (born 1981)

Personal information
- Full name: Toke Holst
- Nationality: Danish (Denmark)
- Born: 1 December 1981 (age 44) Odder, Denmark
- Height: 196 cm (77 in)

Sport
- Sport: Handball
- Position: Left back
- Current club: retired
- Number: 8
National team
Years	Team	Apps	(Gls)
2004-2008	Denmark	3	(1)

Toke Holst (born 1 December 1981) is a Danish former handballer. He played for Danish Handball League side Aarhus GF and Team Tvis Holstebro. He retired in 2023. During his player career he became a doctor, and now has his own clinic.

Holst is noted for three appearances for the Danish national handball team.
