= List of animals culled in zoos =

Culling animals in zoos is the process of segregating animals from a group according to desired or undesired characteristics; the process often ends with the segregated animals being killed. Several reasons are given for culling in zoos, including a lack of space, the genes of the culled animals are over-represented in the zoo population, the (young) animal might be attacked or killed, or the culled animals have contracted a disease. Mark Bekoff, an American biologist and ethologist coined the term "zoothanasia" to describe zoo culling.

Because animals in zoos are killed for many reasons, such as old age or disease, just as pet animals are often euthanized because of health problems, it is beyond the scope of this list to identify every case where an animal is killed in a zoo. The list focuses on controversial, unusual or otherwise noteworthy cases where the incident was reported in national or international sources.

== List ==
The following is a list of animals where their culling and euthanisation in zoos and wildlife (safari) parks has been covered by the general media.

Country	Zoo	Species (Common name)	Species (Taxonomic name)	Year	Number	Reason given by zoo	Source
United States	Maryland Zoo	African elephant	Elephas africana	2024	1	Elderly animal	
United States	National Zoo	Asian elephant	Elephas maximus	2024	1 Kamala	Elderly animal	
Denmark	Aalborg Zoo	African elephant	Elephas africana	2024	2	Elderly animals	
Scotland	Camperdown Wildlife Centre	Wolf	Canis lupus lupus	2023	4	Agitation after the death of pack leader	
Switzerland	Basel Zoo	Orangutan	Pongo pygmaeus	2022	1	Zoo did not wish to hand rear infant after mother's death	
Taiwan	Taipei Zoo	Giant panda	Ailuropoda melanoleuca	2022	1 Tuan Tuan (panda)	Suffering multiple seizures brought on by gemistocytic astrocytoma lesions on his brain	
Denmark	Copenhagen Zoo	Wolf	Canis lupus lupus	2020	3	Make space for new animal	
Denmark	Copenhagen Zoo	Lion	Panthera leo	2014	4	Make space for new animal	
Denmark	Copenhagen Zoo	Giraffe	Giraffa camelopardalis	2014	1 (Marius)	Prevent inbreeding	
Denmark	Odense Zoo	Lion	Panthera leo	2014	2		
Germany	Magdeburg Zoo	Siberian tiger	Panthera tigris altaica	2010	3 (cubs)	Cubs were hybrids	
England	Woburn Safari Park	Rhesus macaque	Macaca mulatta	2000	215	Infected with a virus	
Switzerland	Bern Zoo	Namibian lion	Panthera leo	2007	2 (cubs)	Insufficient space	
England	Paignton Zoo	Peacock		2007	7	Complaints from neighbours about noise	
Denmark	Copenhagen Zoo	Leopard	Panthera pardus	2012	2 (cubs)	Genes were over-represented	
Denmark	Copenhagen Zoo	Lion	Panthera leo	2014	4 (including 2 cubs)	To make space for another male	
Australia	Adelaide zoo	Greater flamingo	Phoenicopterus roseus	2014	1 Greater (flamingo)	Arthritis	
Canada	Assiniboine Park Zoo	Polar bear	Ursus maritimus	2008	1 Debby (polar bear)	Multiple organ failure	
United States	Central Park Zoo	Polar bear	Ursus maritimus	2013	1 Gus (polar bear)	Inoperable tumour	
Spain	Barcelona Zoo	Western lowland gorilla	Gorilla gorilla gorilla	2003	1 Snowflake (gorilla)	Skin cancer	
Netherlands	Dolfinarium Harderwijk	Walrus	Odobenus rosmarus	2013	1 Igor (walrus)	Shoulder-joint problems	
Germany	Leipzig Zoo	Virginia opossum	Didelphis virginiana	2011	1 Heidi (opossum)	Age-related health problems	
United States	Wild Adventures Theme Park	Asian elephant	Elephas maximus	2011	1 Queenie (waterskiing elephant)	Deteriorating health	
United States	Oklahoma City Zoo	Sea lion		2010	1 Midge the Sea Lion	Lung cancer	
New Zealand	Auckland Zoo	Asian elephant		2009	1 Kashin (elephant)	Arthritis and foot abscess	
Australia	Southern Ash Wildlife Centre	Koala		2009	1 Sam (koala)	Urogenital chlamydiosis	
United States	Birmingham Zoo	Western lowland gorilla	Gorilla gorilla gorilla	2008	1 Babec	Heart disease	
United States	Santa Barbara Zoo	Rothschild's giraffe	G. c. rothschild	2008	1 Gemina (giraffe)	Deteriorating health	
United States	Dallas Zoo	Western lowland gorilla		2008	1 Jenny (gorilla)	Inoperable tumour	

== Summary quotes ==
- "...five giraffes have been put down by zoos in Denmark since 2012."
- "Dr Lesley Dickie, executive director of EAZA, [said] that between 3,000 and 5,000 healthy animals are put down every year across Europe. 'That’s our estimate for all animals management euthanised in the zoo, be it tadpoles up until a giraffe'. Among those killed were 22 healthy zebras, four hippos and two Arabian Oryx were also put down. The Oryx were killed at Edinburgh and London zoos in 2000 and 2001."

== See also ==
- Animal euthanasia
