= Marius (giraffe) =

Giraffe in Copenhagen Zoo

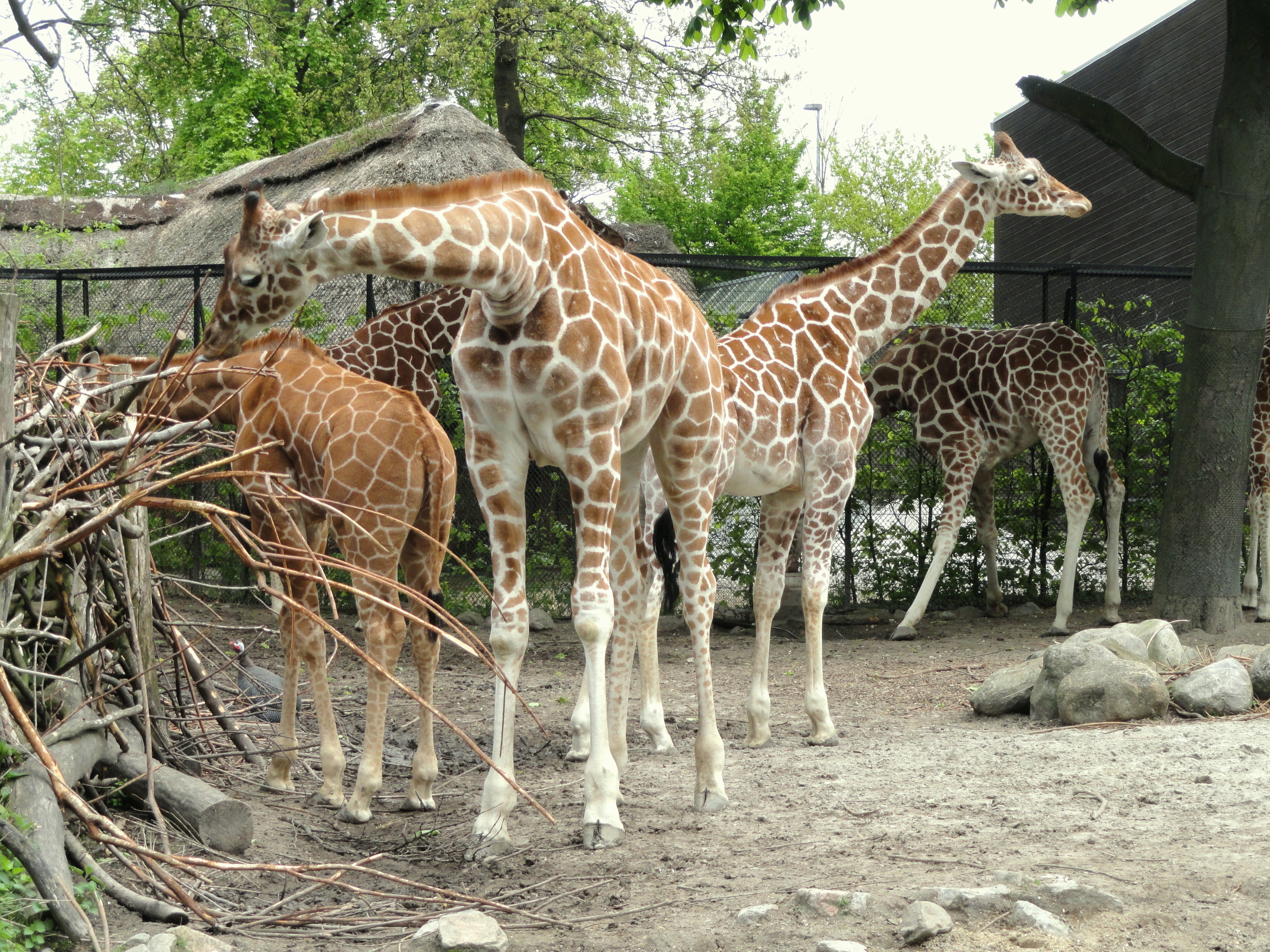
- Giraffes at Copenhagen Zoo
- Species: Giraffa camelopardalis reticulata
- Sex: Male
- Born: 6 February 2012; Copenhagen
- Died: 9 February 2014 (aged 2); Copenhagen
- Nationality: Denmark
- Known for: Controversial culling at young age
- Owner: Governed by Copenhagen Zoo

Marius (6 February 2012 – 9 February 2014) was a male giraffe living at Copenhagen Zoo. Though healthy, he was genetically unsuitable for future captive breeding, as his genes were over-represented in the captive population, so the zoo authorities decided to euthanize him. Despite several offers to adopt Marius and an online petition to save him, he was killed on 9 February 2014. His body was then dissected and necropsied in a public educational class and then fed to the zoo's lions, tigers, and polar bears. The event received worldwide media coverage and generated responses from several organisations and individuals, including death threats to staff at the zoo.

Between when records began in the early 1900s and when the animal was killed in February 2014, five giraffes had been killed for similar "conservation management reasons". Since 2012, two other young giraffe bulls in the European Endangered Species Programme (EEP) were also culled in zoos. The captive population in Europe stood at 798 giraffes in 2014.

== Life ==
Marius was born on 6 February 2012 at Copenhagen Zoo where he lived all his life. The zoo has a policy of only giving an official name to a few selected animals such as elephants with the prospect of living up to 50 years or more but the keepers informally named the giraffe "Marius". Shortly after his birth, Copenhagen Zoo informed the coordinator of the European Endangered Species Programme (EEP) for giraffes who, according to the Danish Zoo Federation, along with his committee tried to find a suitable location for Marius but failed.

Following the recommendations of the European Association of Zoos and Aquaria (EAZA) the zoo decided to put down Marius. In a statement, Copenhagen Zoo explained that:

As this giraffe's genes are well represented in the breeding programme and as there is no place for the giraffe in the zoo's giraffe herd the European Breeding Programme for Giraffes has agreed that Copenhagen Zoo euthanizes the giraffe.

In an interview with the BBC, a spokesman for the EAZA said that Marius had siblings with similar genes who were already in the organisation's breeding programme,(~) which meant that he could not add anything to the programme. He specified that Marius could not be considered inbred, refuting earlier reports.

=== Offers of placement ===
Offers to relocate Marius were received by Copenhagen Zoo, but none were taken up. Commenting on several offers the zoo stated that the offers did not match with the requirements of the EAZA. As an EAZA member, the Copenhagen zoo does not own its animals, but manages them. The zoo is also not allowed to sell animals and the placement of animals outside of the EEP is limited to those that follow the same set of rules as EAZA. The following offers were declined.

EAZA member Krakow Zoo said it offered to adopt Marius but received an unexplained refusal from the EAZA. A last-minute offer by EAZA member Yorkshire Wildlife Park to adopt Marius into a bachelor herd in its giraffe house was declined, according to Bengt Holst because the wildlife park's space would be better used by a "genetically more valuable giraffe" than Marius, whose brother already lived there. Also declined were offers from two non-EAZA members, the Dutch Landgoed Hoenderdaell wildlife park and the Swedish Frösö Zoo, as well as an offer by a private individual.

As the zoo was unable to find a suitable place for Marius, considered sterilization damaging to his quality of life and did not want to send him to another EEP zoo where he would take up a "space for more genetically valuable giraffes", he was killed on 9 February 2014.

== Killing ==
The zoo had announced that he would be anaesthetized before being put down with a bolt gun, as lethal injection would make it unsafe for the carnivores at the zoo to eat. However, the euthanizing vet said that he used a rifle, reportedly a Winchester.

Most media wrote that Marius was 18 months old. Bengt Holst, the zoo's Scientific Director, corrected this, saying Marius was two years old. He added that alternative solutions were considered, but not found viable.

== Public dissection ==
After being euthanized, Marius was publicly dissected. This was done in a separate area of the zoo, but accessible for those interested, including parents with children. Associated Press distributed a photo of the public dissection worldwide, heightening the attention to the case. Parts of his body were fed to the zoo's lions. Other parts were sent to seven research projects. The zoo's spokesman said, "I'm actually proud because I think we have given children a huge understanding of the anatomy of a giraffe that they wouldn't have had from watching a giraffe in a photo." According to Bengt Holst, public dissection of deceased animals fits with the zoo's policy to educate people on nature and wildlife, and is a normal practice in Denmark. The main animal rights group in Denmark, Dyrenes Beskyttelse, supported the zoo's actions. Others have criticized the public dissection, questioning its educational value.

== Responses ==
=== Zoological organizations ===
Bengt Holst, scientific director at the Danish zoo, said that the amount of international interest had come as a surprise to the zoo, but also stressed the importance of a policy of openness. He defended the killing of the young bull based on culling for artificial selection. He said that giraffes in zoos bred very well and where this was the case, giraffes had to be selected to ensure the best genes were passed down to ensure the animals' long-term survival. He confirmed the zoo typically culls 20 to 30 animals every year, mostly antelopes, llamas and goats.

EAZA issued a press release "fully supporting" the decisions and policy of the Copenhagen Zoo. Its executive director, Lesley Dickie, supported the killing and public dissection, and said that EAZA's position receives support from the International Union for Conservation of Nature. An EAZA spokesperson estimated that on average each of its members annually euthanizes about five large mammals.

The executive director of the North American Association of Zoos and Aquariums stated in response to public concerns that programs and procedures of EAZA vary from theirs.

==== EAZA members ====
Doué-la-Fontaine Zoo in France said Copenhagen Zoo had not broken EAZA rules, but called the events "shocking" and wondered why a more "soft" solution had not been found.

Dublin Zoo in Ireland was "saddened" by the giraffe's death, calling it "cold, calculated, cynical and callous".

The director of Hellabrunn Zoo in Munich, Germany said the zoo would never kill a giraffe or do a similar public dissection, which had left him "speechless". He said some animals such as goats and guinea pigs are slaughtered as food for predators, but without "making a show" of this, and that the killing of animals has been more accepted in Scandinavian zoos for a number of years, but he did not know the exact reasoning behind the Copenhagen Zoo's decisions.

The director of Kraków Zoo in Poland, Józef Skotnicki, expressed deep disappointment with the EAZA attitude, the killing, and the public dissection.

Moscow Zoo in Russia condemned the actions, saying it did not support killing policies and instead favoured sterilization. It also expressed concern for the potential harm to children who attended the dissection.

Nuremberg Zoo in Germany supported the Copenhagen Zoo's actions. Director Dag Encke noted that giraffes had more emotional appeal than some other species and that the policy and actions had been well considered. With regard to the public dissection, he commented that children tended to have a natural curiosity, provided that everything was well explained.

The director of Prague Zoo in the Czech Republic criticized the public dissection, saying it "...should have been done with a certain amount of dignity and not in the presence of the public and cameras". However he also wrote that the killing should be evaluated "after a necessary interval and from a number of perspectives."

A vet at Safaripark Beekse Bergen in the Netherlands said euthanasia was considered less objectionable by Scandinavian zoos than by Dutch zoos, which instead choose to use bachelor herds and birth control.

The South Lakes Wild Animal Park in England supported the policy, writing that Copenhagen Zoo "has a very strict welfare and ethics record and is a very highly regarded zoo in every aspect."

A specialist vet at Tiergarten Schönbrunn in Austria stated that "if a giraffe likewise would be born in Schönbrunn, which due to a risk of inbreeding could not be placed elsewhere, then a similar procedure like the one in Copenhagen could take place there" but called the public feeding of the predators "emotionless".

=== Animal rights organisations ===
Dyrenes Beskyttelse, a Danish animal protection organization, said that it trusts the decisions made by the zoo and pointed to the issue of the large numbers of authorized killings and culls of animals like piglets and stags.

Denmark's Organisation Against the Suffering of Animals repudiated the action as unethical, saying:

This situation should not have occurred at all. It just shows that the zoo is in fact not the ethical institution that it wants to portray itself as being, because here you have a waste product – that being Marius. Here we have a zoo which thinks that putting this giraffe down instead of thinking of alternatives is the best option.

The Born Free Foundation called for,

a review and amendment to EAZA euthanasia policies, to ensure healthy animals who can be relocated are not killed, and for increased transparency in zoos across Europe, with accurate recording and publication of the numbers of healthy animals that are destroyed in each licensed zoo in the region.

PETA UK director Mimi Bekhechi has stated

Marius' death should be a wake-up call for anyone who still harbors the illusion that zoos serve any purpose beyond incarcerating intelligent animals for profit

=== Politics ===
Esther Ouwehand, Member of the Dutch Parliament for the Party for the Animals asked the State Secretary for Economic Affairs for clarification on the practice in Dutch zoos and request for more strict European regulation on breeding programs. In her response the State Secretary did not second additional restrictions arguing that the role of zoos, as preservers of the biodiversity of animals as is described in the EU Directive 1999/22/EC, does not compromise the individuality, health and well-being of the animal.

=== Public ===
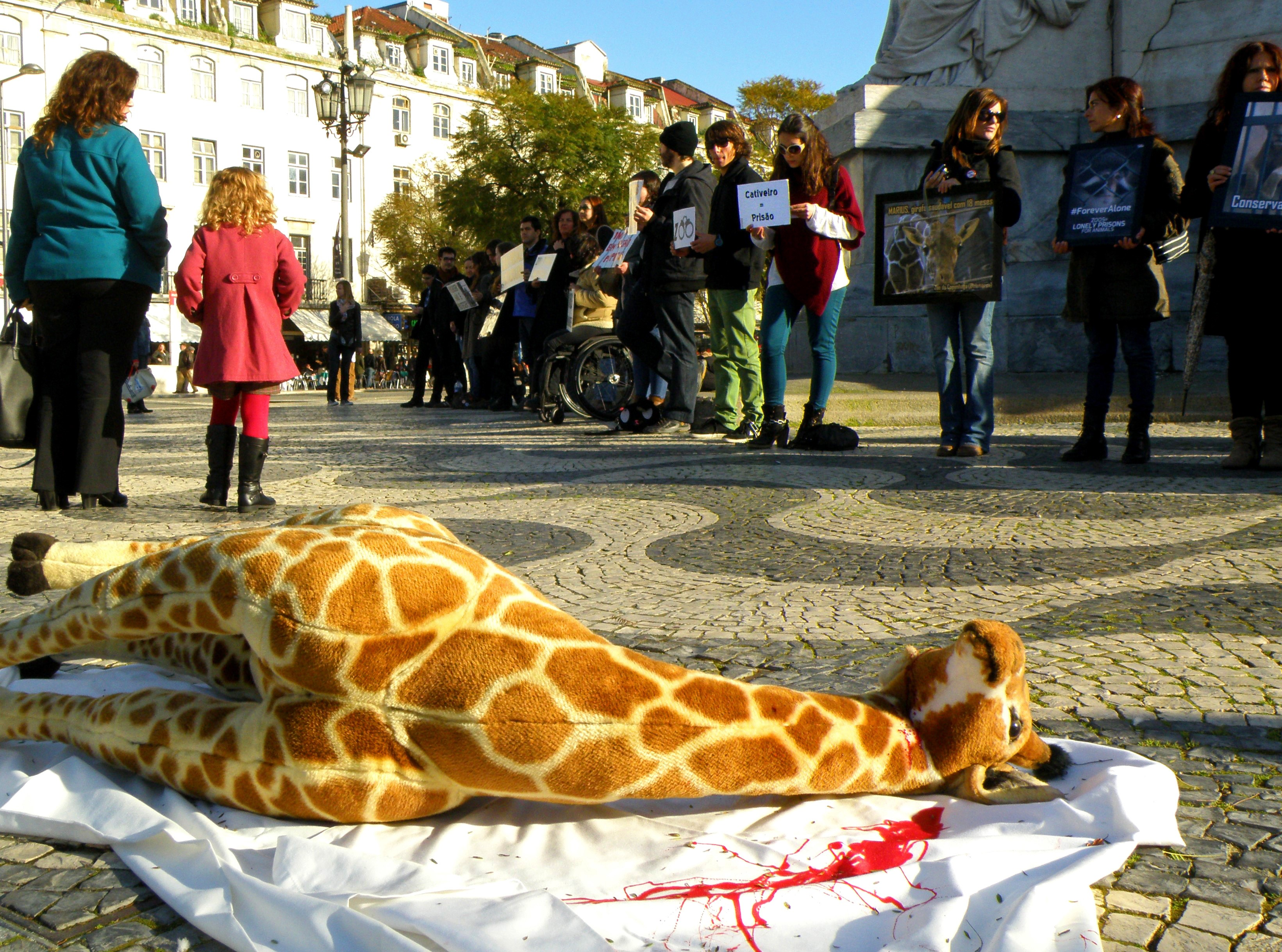
Sit-in protest in Lisbon, February 2014

Members of the public started an international online petition directed at the Copenhagen Zoo to save Marius. Upon its closure shortly after Marius's death, the petition had collected over 27,000 signatures.

Copenhagen Zoo managers confirmed that staff, including its head of conservation, received death threats by phone and email following the killing of Marius.

On 26 May, Bengt was elected as Copenhagener of the Year by readers of the Danish newspaper Politiken. The zoo director was nominated by the newspaper for his business-like response to Channel 4 reporter Matt Frei and for "insisting that we should not change the world into a Disney World wherein no person ever dies".

=== Individuals ===
The reported events quickly gained attention in many countries, and some examples from entries in the public debate are given below.

Jack Hanna, American director emeritus of the Columbus Zoo and Aquarium in the United States, criticized the zoo's actions, calling it "abominable, insensitive, grotesque". He stated that such an action would never have occurred in the United States.

Ben Fogle, British broadcaster and adventurer, criticized the "shocking lack of compassion" in the dealing with zoo animals as the result of unsuitable funds for many contemporary zoo institutions.

Alan Posener, British-German columnist, condemned the killing and dissection as a sort of entertainment, which he saw as based on a fascination of violence. To him, a zoo strategy built on Disney-like fairy-tales was actually preferable to instruction in emotionless and patronizing Darwinism.

Robert Young, professor of Wildlife Conservation at the University of Salford, wrote that the case illustrated cultural and institutional differences in how zoos weigh aspects of the animals' quality of life. He discussed how some zoos may favour sterilization and increased longevity. Copenhagen Zoo, however, favours non-sterilization, fewer constraints on breeding and full periods of parenthood, though at the risk of shorter lives for the offspring.

Éric Baratay, a professor in history at the Université Jean Moulin in Lyon, France, and a specialist in the relationship between humans and other animals, called the media transparency of the event "very surprising" as it concerns a baby giraffe, "since giraffes are among the most beloved animals among the public".

Victoria Martindale, British animal activist, wrote that the case illustrated how zoos were unnatural surroundings for animals, and that the early death liberated Marius from "years of imprisonment".

Brendan O'Neill, British editor of Spiked magazine, criticized mass media presentation of the events as an example of sensationalist press tendencies.

Writing in the American magazine Psychology Today, Denise Cummins, a Fellow of the Association for Psychological Science, questioned the precise educational benefit to children of attending the public dissection. Entitled "What We Learned from Marius the Giraffe", the article criticized the move, which it called a "canned hunt-blood sport", and insisted that the children would only learn that "killing animals for entertainment is perfectly legitimate".

Marc Bekoff, American Professor Emeritus of Ecology and Evolutionary Biology at the University of Colorado, Boulder, said: "The cold justification for these killings offered by zoo workers chilled and scared me. Furthermore, these easily avoidable deaths, perversely justified 'in the name of conservation', are horrible lessons for youngsters and run counter to global programs in humane education and compassionate conservation."

== See also ==
- Conservation (ethic)
- Culling in zoos
- List of animals culled in zoos
