= Gemina (giraffe) =

Baringo giraffe

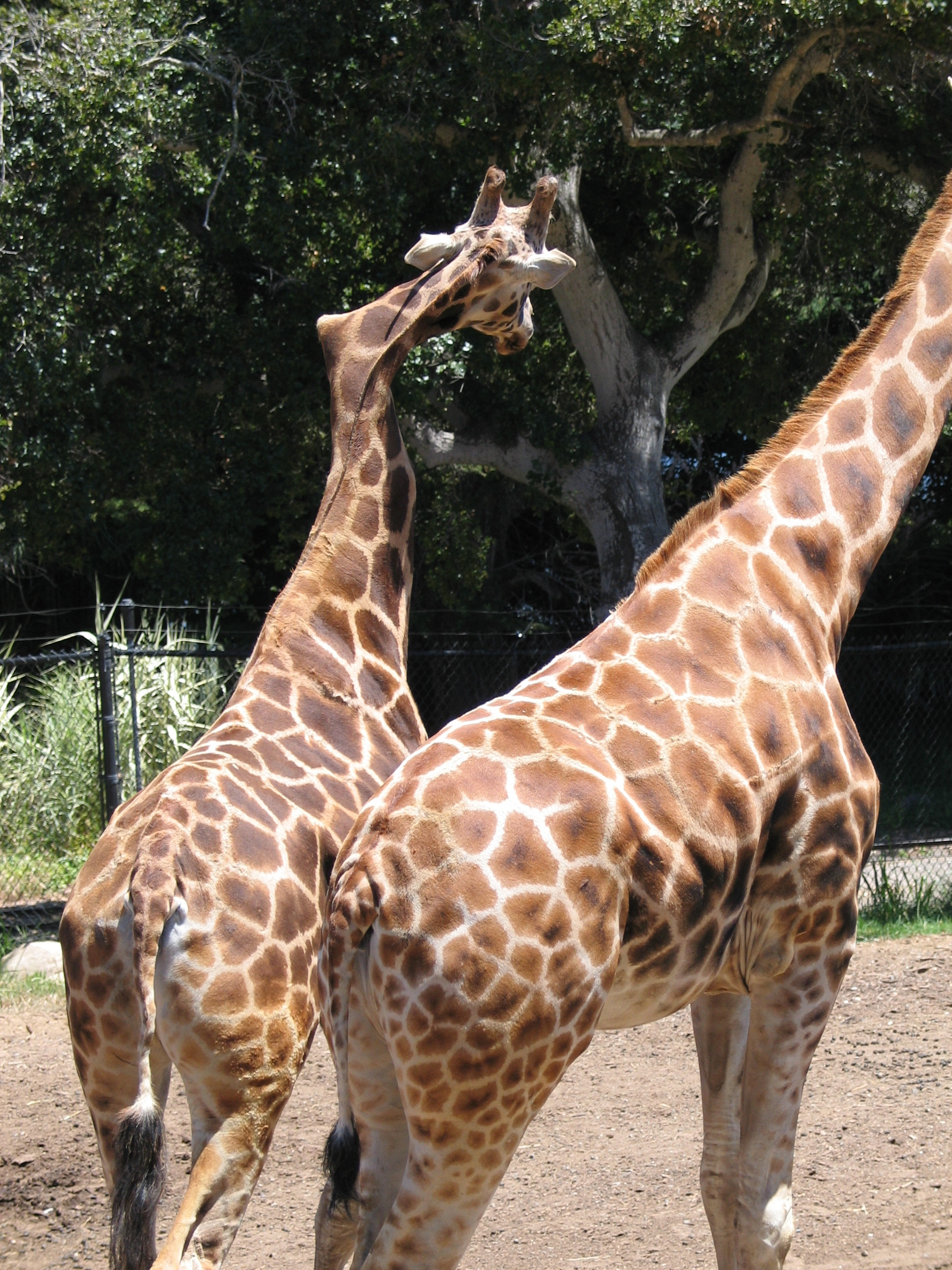
- Gemina the giraffe (left), with a normal giraffe shown for comparison
- Species: Baringo giraffe
- Sex: Female
- Born: July 16, 1986; San Diego Wild Animal Park
- Died: 9 January 2008 (aged 21); Santa Barbara Zoo
- Cause of death: Euthanasia
- Known for: Neck deformity
- Residence: Santa Barbara Zoo
- Height: 12 ft (3.7 m)

Gemina (July 16, 1986 – January 9, 2008) (pronounced Jeh-MEE-nah) was a 12-foot-tall (3.7 m) Baringo giraffe who lived in the Santa Barbara Zoo in Santa Barbara, California. She was known for the peculiar deformity in her neck, which was bent by almost ninety degrees between her C3 and C4 vertebrae. The deformity was not present when she was born, in the San Diego Wild Animal Park, but first became noticeable when she was three years old.

== Life ==
Gemina was born on July 16, 1986, at the San Diego Wild Animal Park. She showed no signs of a neck deformity at birth and was moved to the Santa Barbara Zoo when she was approximately one year old.

Gemina's deformity did not appear until she was three years old. Her neck vertebrae began to jut out from her neck at this age. Eventually her neck became bent sharply. The last time that this type of a deformity had been documented in a giraffe was in 1902. X-rays of Gemina's neck showed that her vertebrae had fused together, but scientists, zoologists and veterinarians could find no explanation for the deformity. Gemina was seen tumbling end over end when she was two years old. However, tests found no sign of injury at the time, and there is no evidence that the accident caused the neck deformity. Gemina gave birth to a calf in 1991, but the calf died of pneumonia soon after birth.

Gemina lived an almost-normal life for a zoo giraffe, except that she had to be fed separately; her keepers noted that her tongue was shorter than those of the other giraffes, and she did not have peripheral vision to the same extent that normal giraffes do. The zoo cited her as an inspiration for disabled children, and she was featured on an episode of Miracle Workers, an ABC reality show, as an inspiration for a child with scoliosis. Children sang to her at her 21st birthday celebration in July 2007.

Despite her rare neck deformity, Gemina reached an old age for a giraffe. She outlived the average giraffe by almost six years.

In December 2007 and January 2008, Gemina stopped eating and her health began to deteriorate due to old age. She was reluctantly euthanized by her keepers at the Santa Barbara Zoo on January 9, 2008.

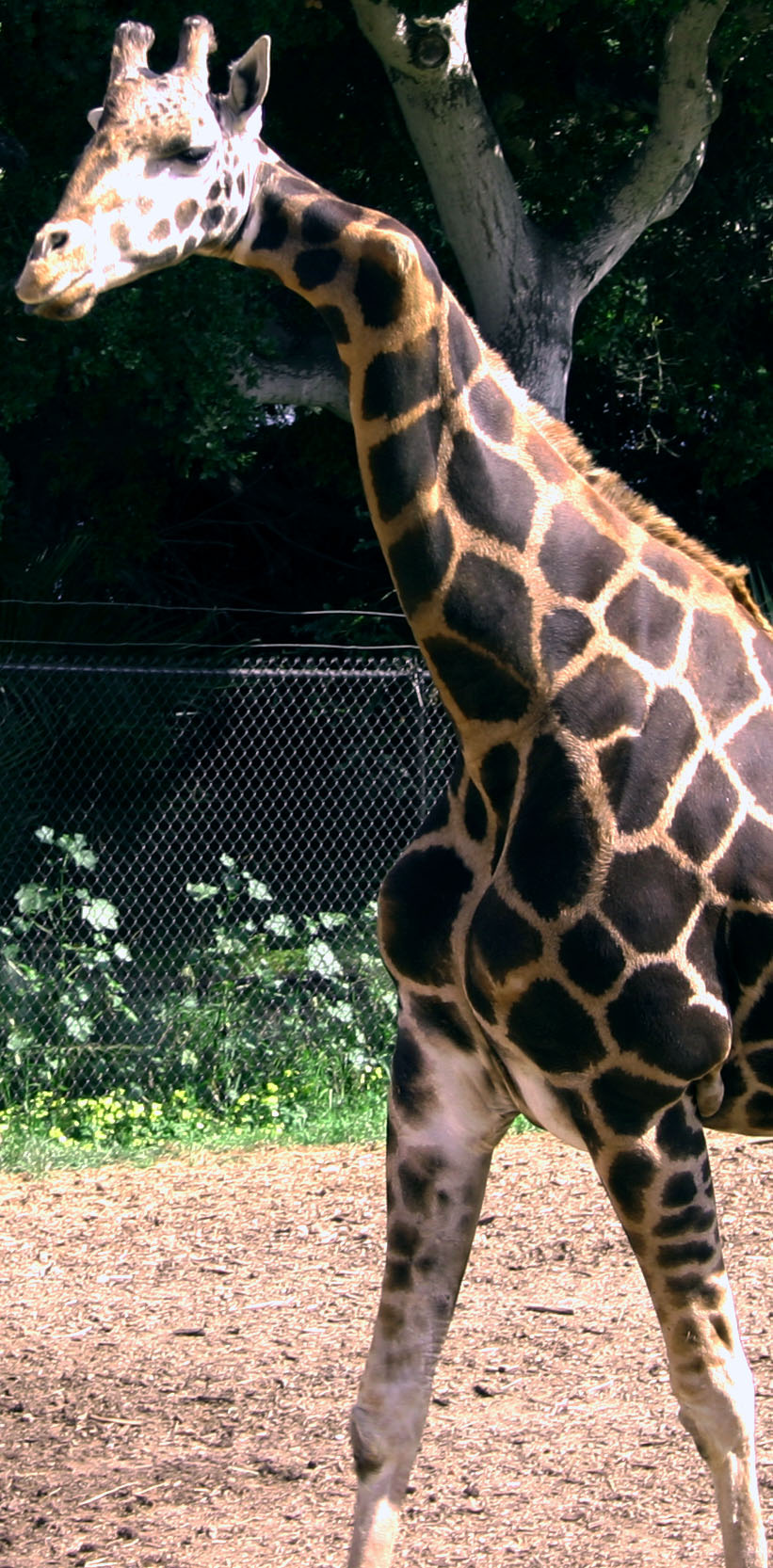
Gemina the Baringo giraffe at the Santa Barbara Zoo

== Legacy ==
In 2016, Gemina's partial skeleton went on display at the Santa Barbara Zoo’s Discovery Pavilion.
