= Santa Barbara Zoo =

Zoo in Santa Barbara, California, United States

- Interactive map of Santa Barbara Zoo
- 34°25′10″N 119°39′54″W
- Date opened: 1963
- Location: Santa Barbara, California, United States
- Land area: 30 acres (12 ha)
- No. of animals: 600
- No. of species: 160
- Memberships: AZA
- Major exhibits: African Veldt, Australian Walkabout, California Trails, Cats of Africa, The Crawford Family Penguin House, The Forest's Edge
- Director: Rich Block
- Website: www.sbzoo.org

The Santa Barbara Zoo is located on 30 acres (12 ha) near the ocean in Santa Barbara, California. It was built on the site of what was known as the Child Estate. It has more than 500 animals in numerous exhibits, including capybara and California condors, and was known for having had a giraffe with a crooked neck. It has a few non-animal attractions, such as the 2 ft (610 mm) narrow gauge Zoo Train, complete with a pair of Chance Rides C. P. Huntington locomotives. The zoo first opened in August 1963.

== Exhibits ==
African Plains or African Veldt, is an African themed habitat that houses giraffes, Sulcata tortoises, and meerkats.

Australian Walkabout is an Australian theme habitat (opened in 2022) where visitors can experience the land, animals, and traditions of Australian Aboriginal culture. It is home to western grey kangaroos, Bennett's wallabies, emus. People can also look inside birdcages and check out the laughing kookaburra, tawny frogmouth, and sulphur-crested cockatoos.

Cats of Africa, which features African lions and fennec foxes, is another African themed habitat opened in 2003. Built on a hillside, the area's fennec fox exhibit is at the top of the slope, with the lion exhibit on the slope itself. The lions are visible from a platform near the fennec fox exhibit.

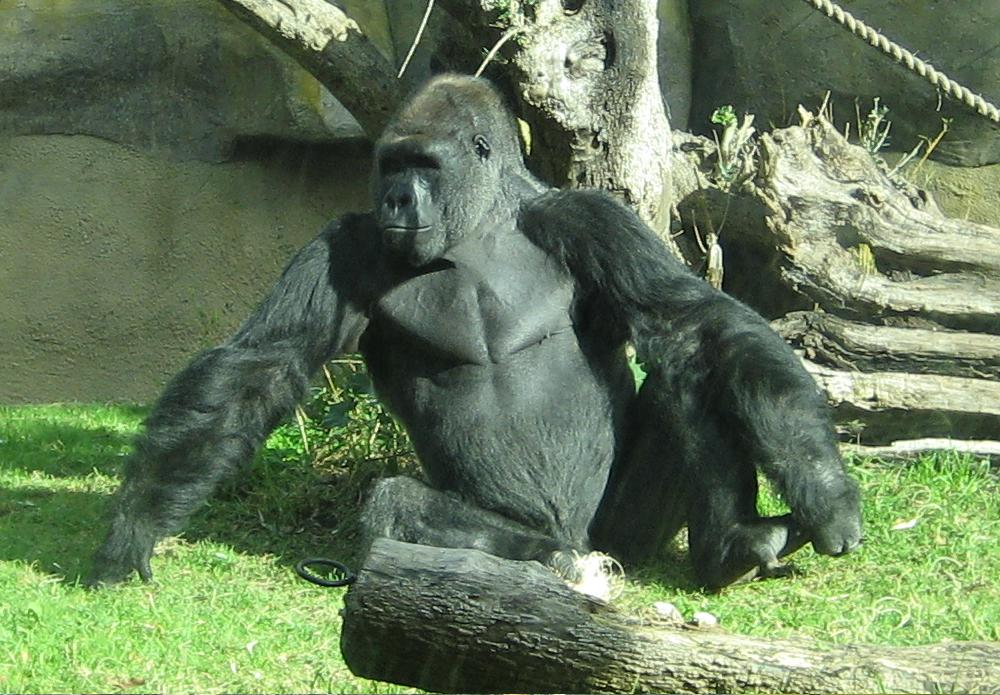
A silverback gorilla.

The Forest's Edge houses two male Western lowland gorillas. The exhibit opened in 1996 and has a glass-walled viewing area as well as an overlook from a replica ranger station. The zoo is the first one that will add gorillas to their exhibit in the present's future.

California Trails exhibits California condors, island foxes, turkey vultures, desert tortoises, and bald eagles. The condor aviary can be viewed from two sides, including on an elevated path lower on the hillside, past the bald eagles, and leading to The Forest's Edge.

The Crawford Family Penguin House opened in June 2006. It houses a colony of Humboldt penguins and has above- and underwater viewing. In the rest of the exhibit area are Inca terns and other coastal South American birds.

=== Giraffes ===
Masai giraffe, native to Africa, south of the Sahara, have become pregnant and successfully given birth at the zoo. Considered genetically valuable they are shared with other zoos.

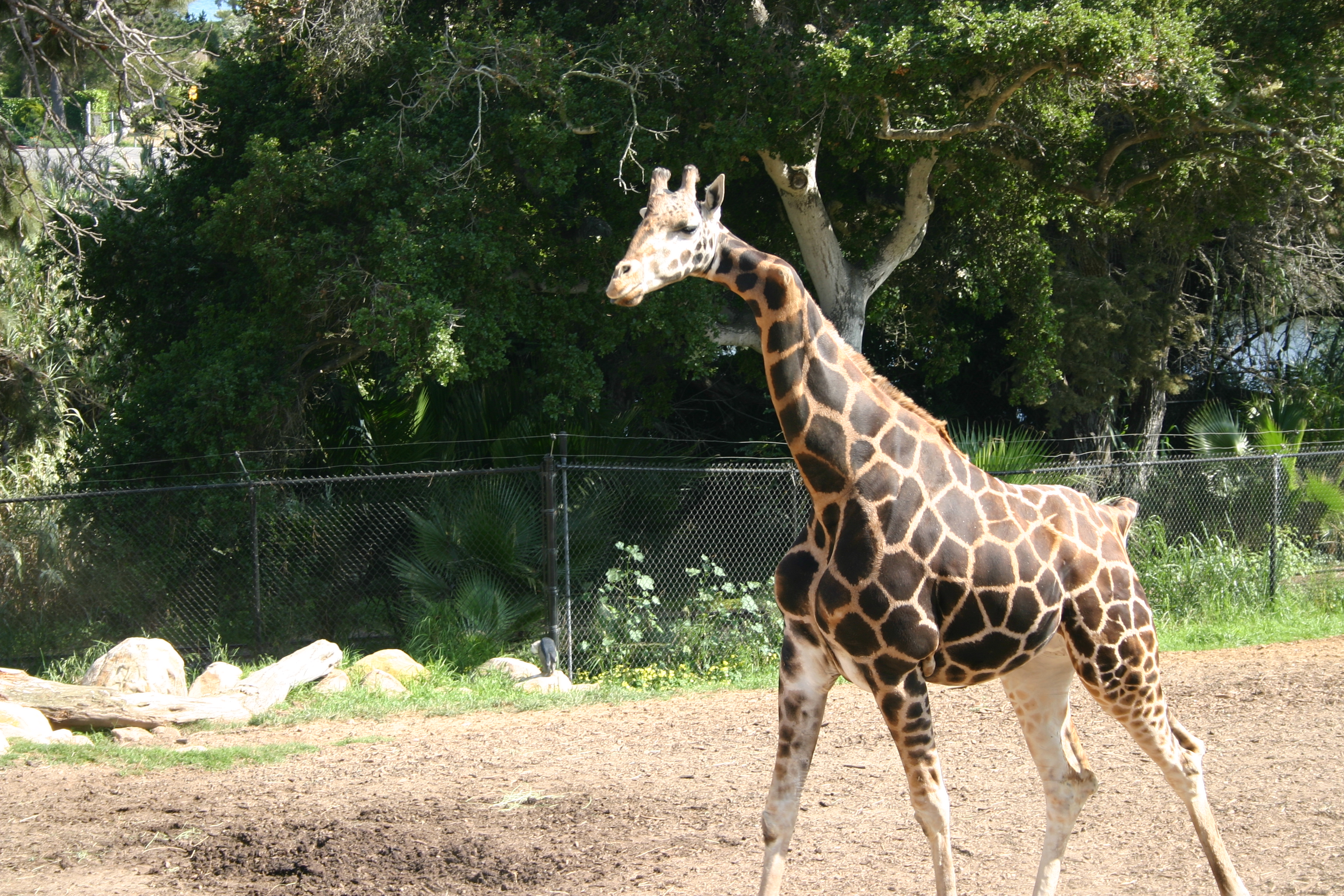
Gemina

Gemina (July 16, 1986 – January 9, 2008) the "crooked-necked giraffe" was one of the most popular animals at the Santa Barbara Zoo. A Baringo giraffe, she was born with a straight neck at the San Diego Zoo Safari Park. At the age of three she developed a bend in her neck. The zoo's veterinarian said that despite her deformity, "Gemina led a very typical existence and was treated as a normal member of the herd. She did not appear to be in discomfort and exhibited normal giraffe behaviors."

Gemina was humanely euthanized at the age of 21 years. "Consistent with the challenges of old age," she had lost her appetite and experienced a decline in quality of life. It is believed that her deformity was not a cause of the condition that led to the decision to euthanize her.

== Gallery ==
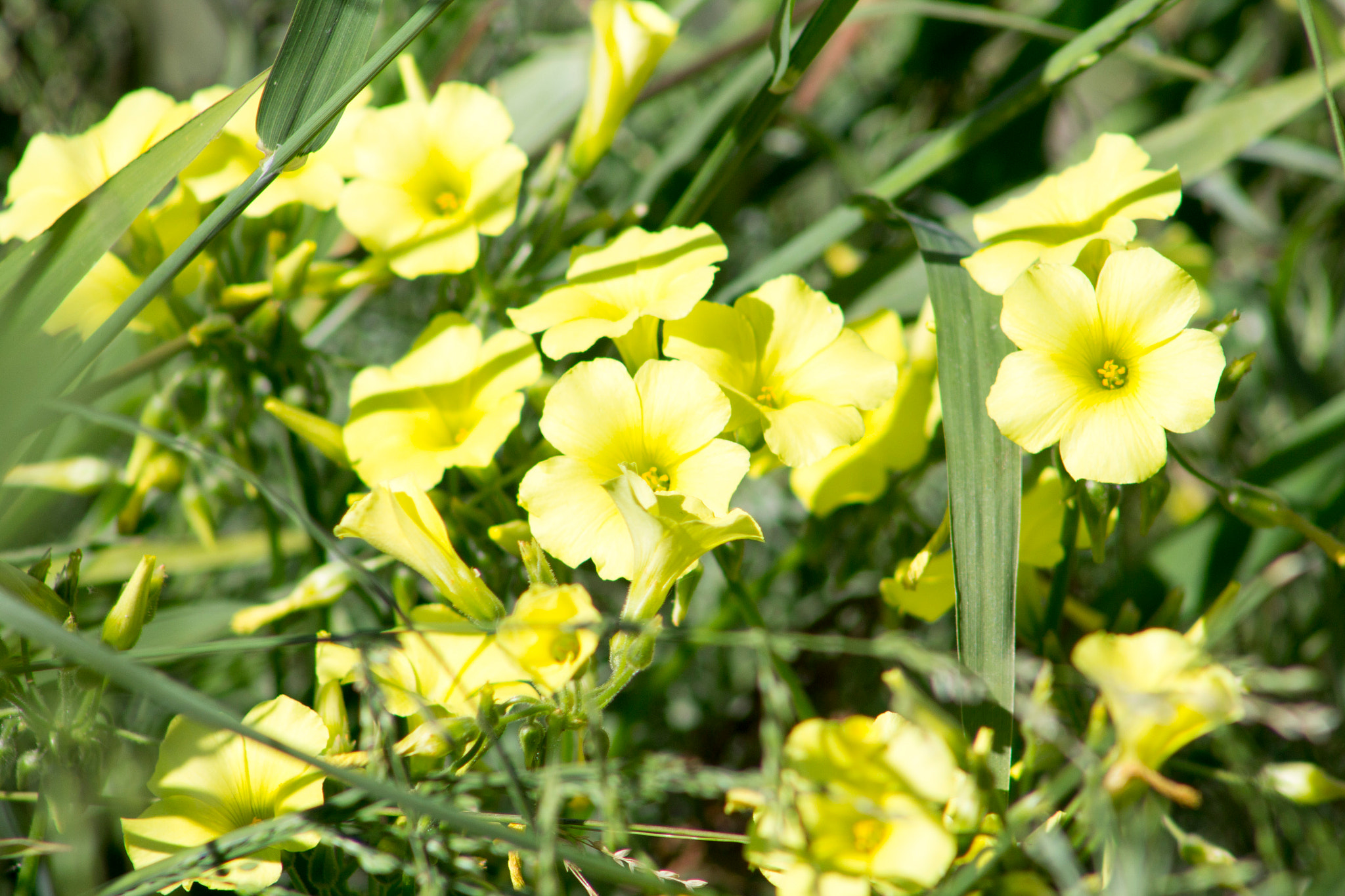
Many flowering plants at the zoo.

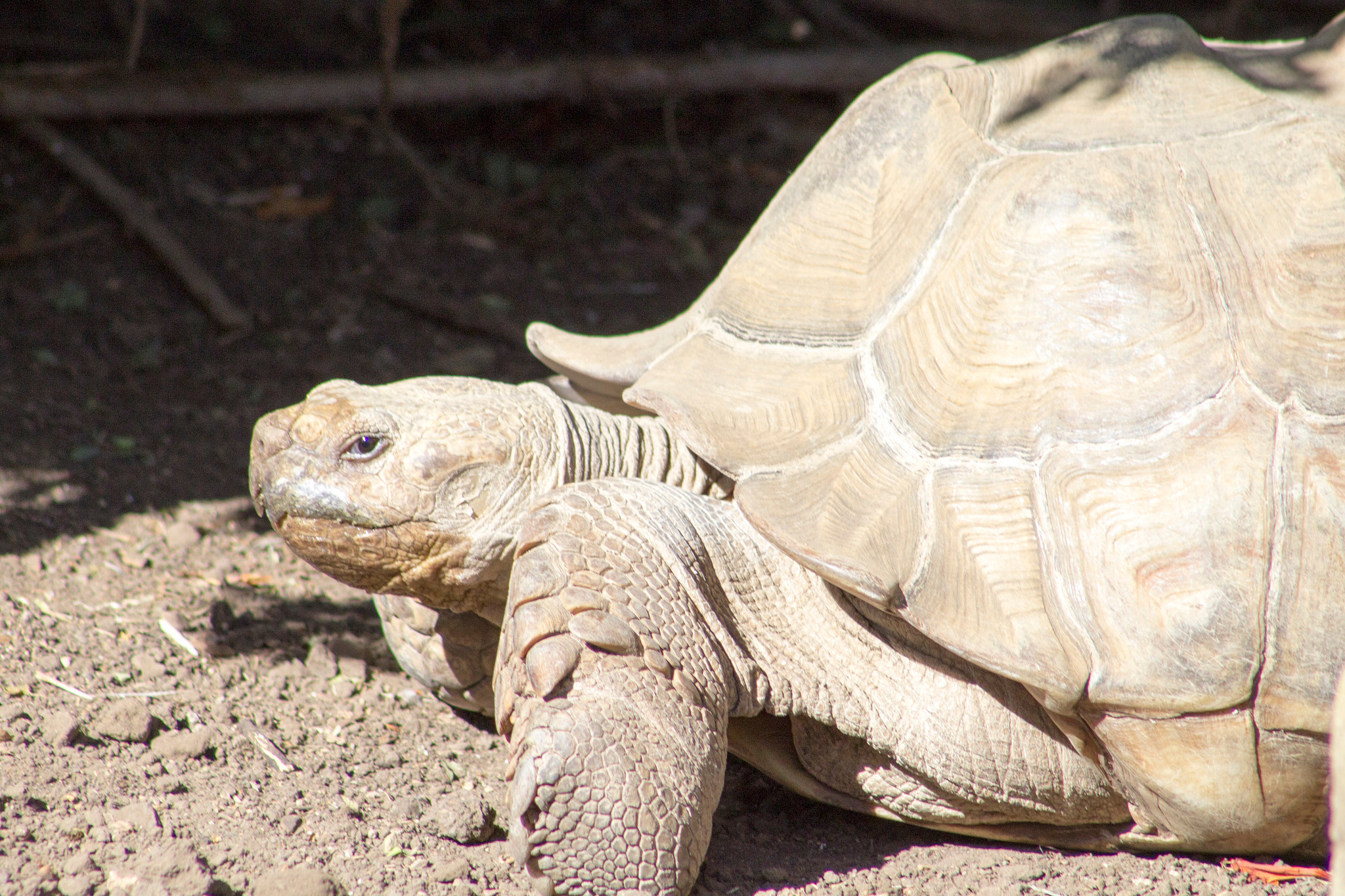
Turtle.

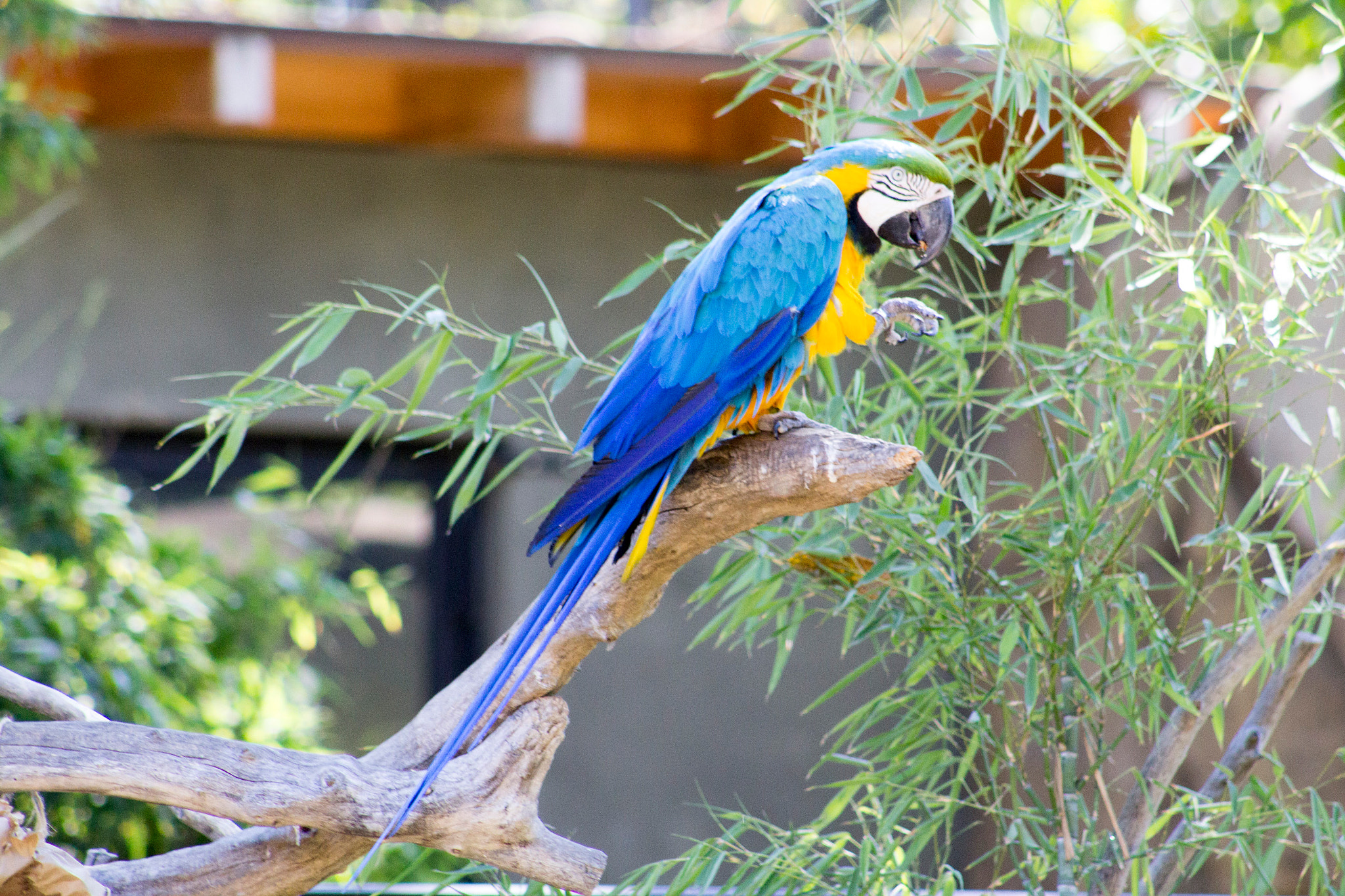
Blue-and-yellow macaw (Ara ararauna).

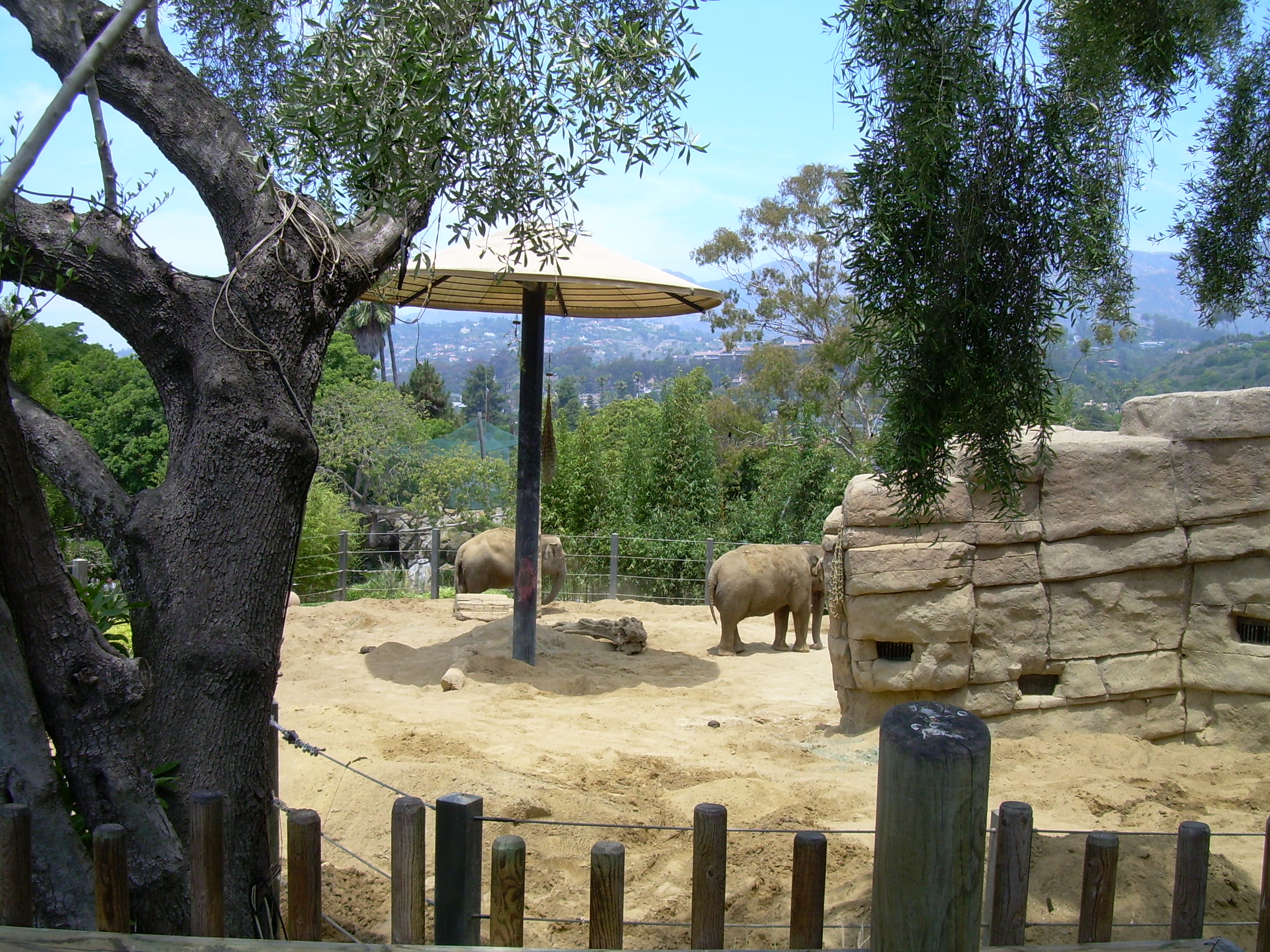
Elephant exhibit.

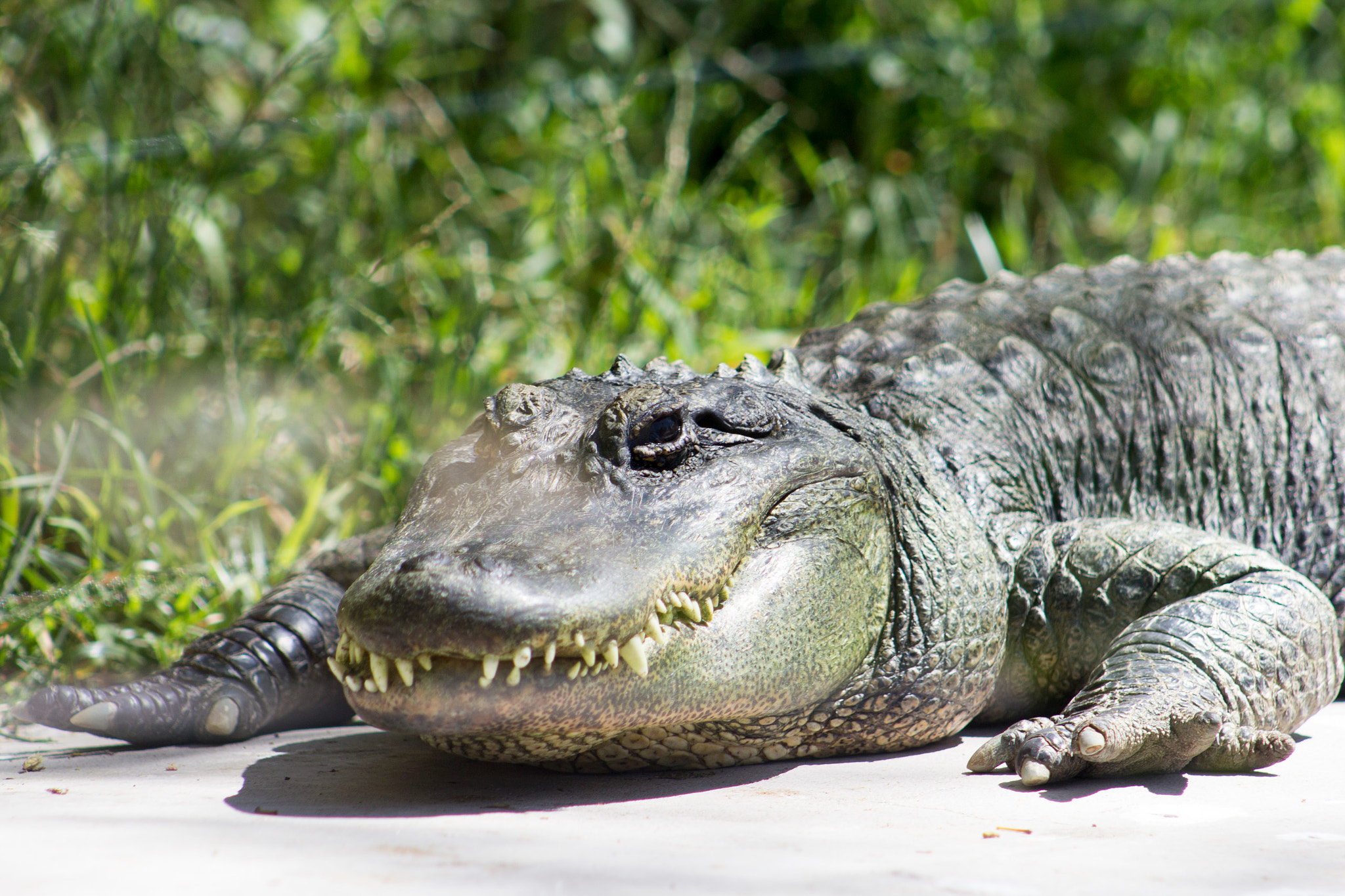
Alligator.

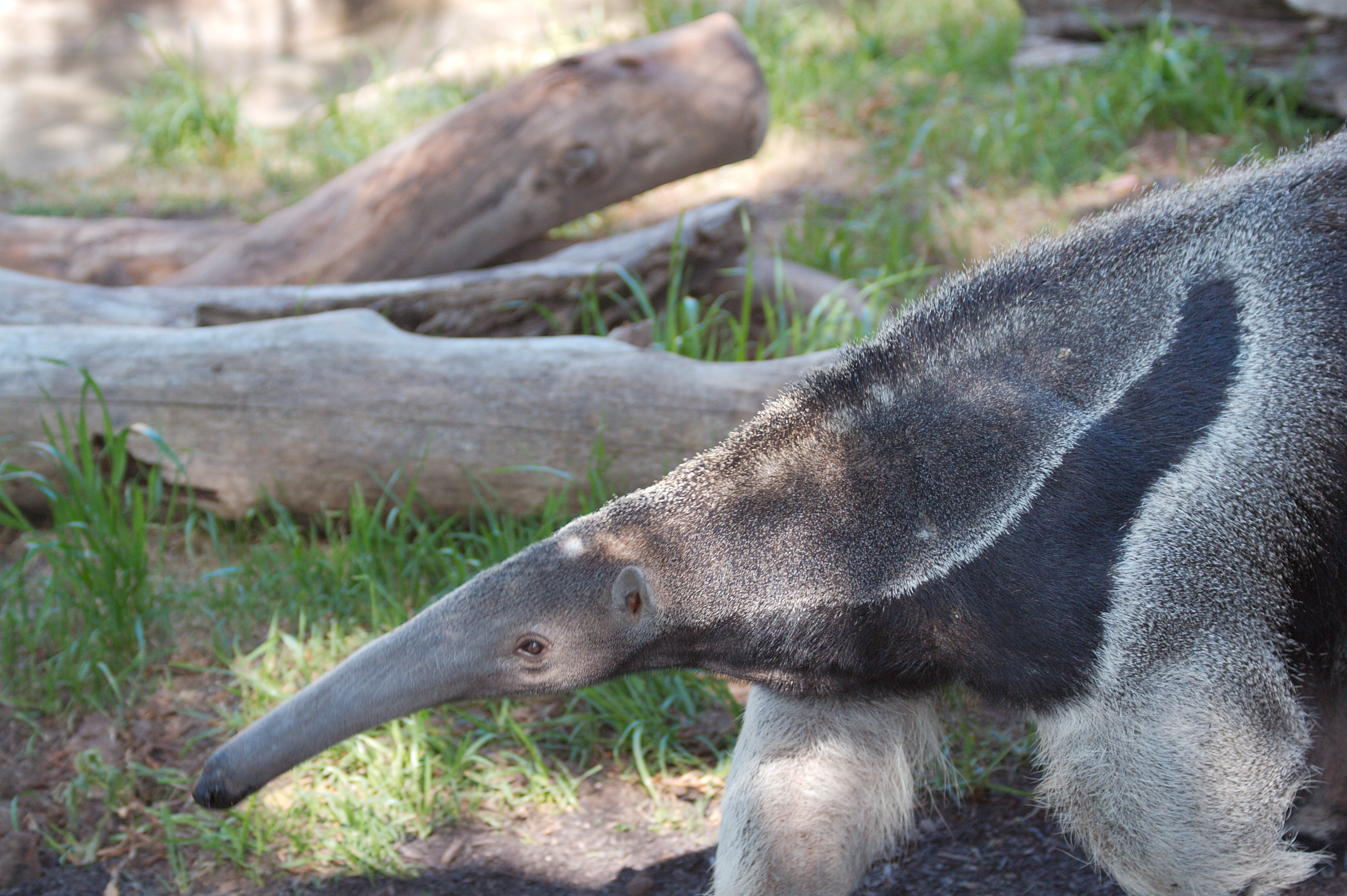
Giant anteater.

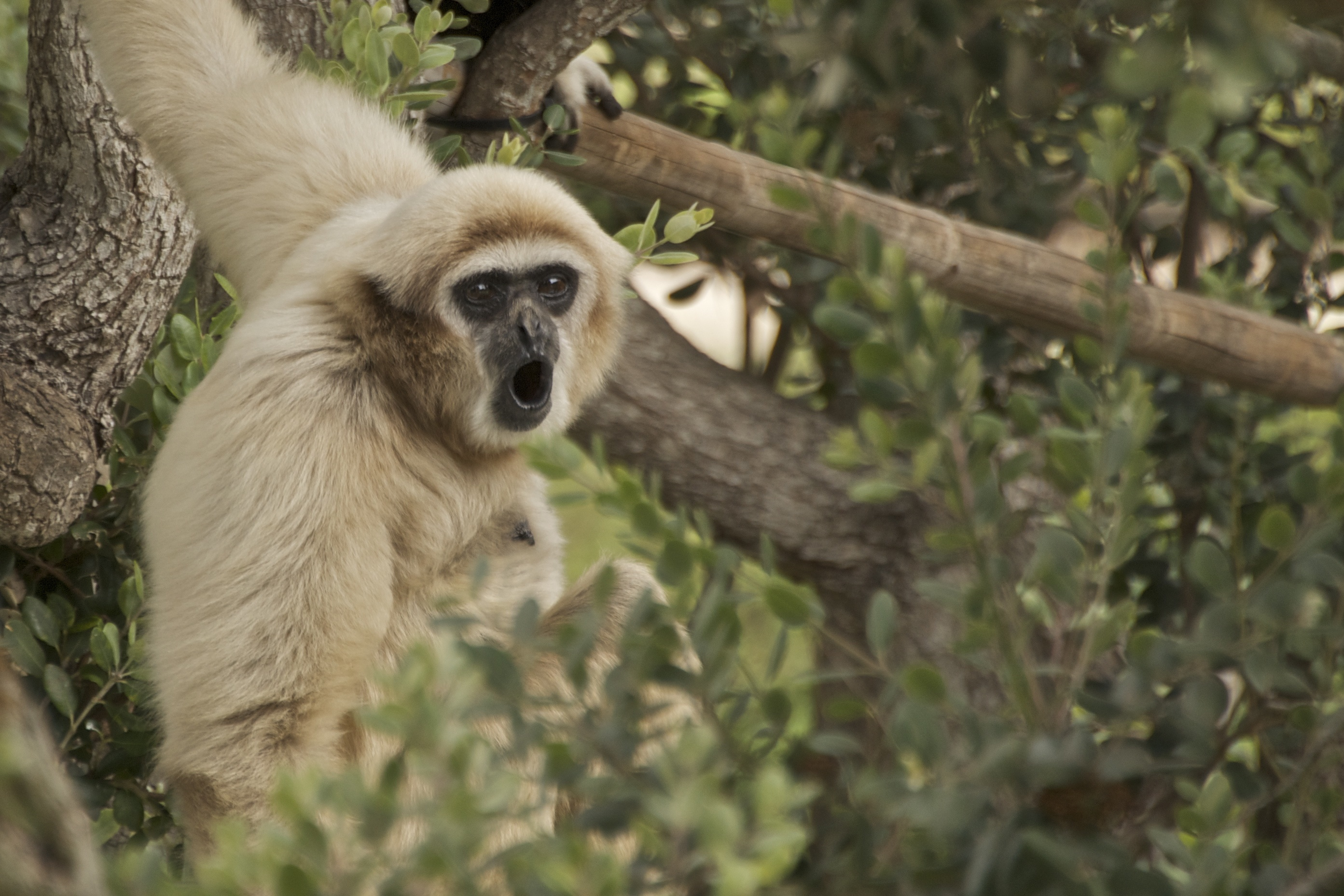
Gibbon.

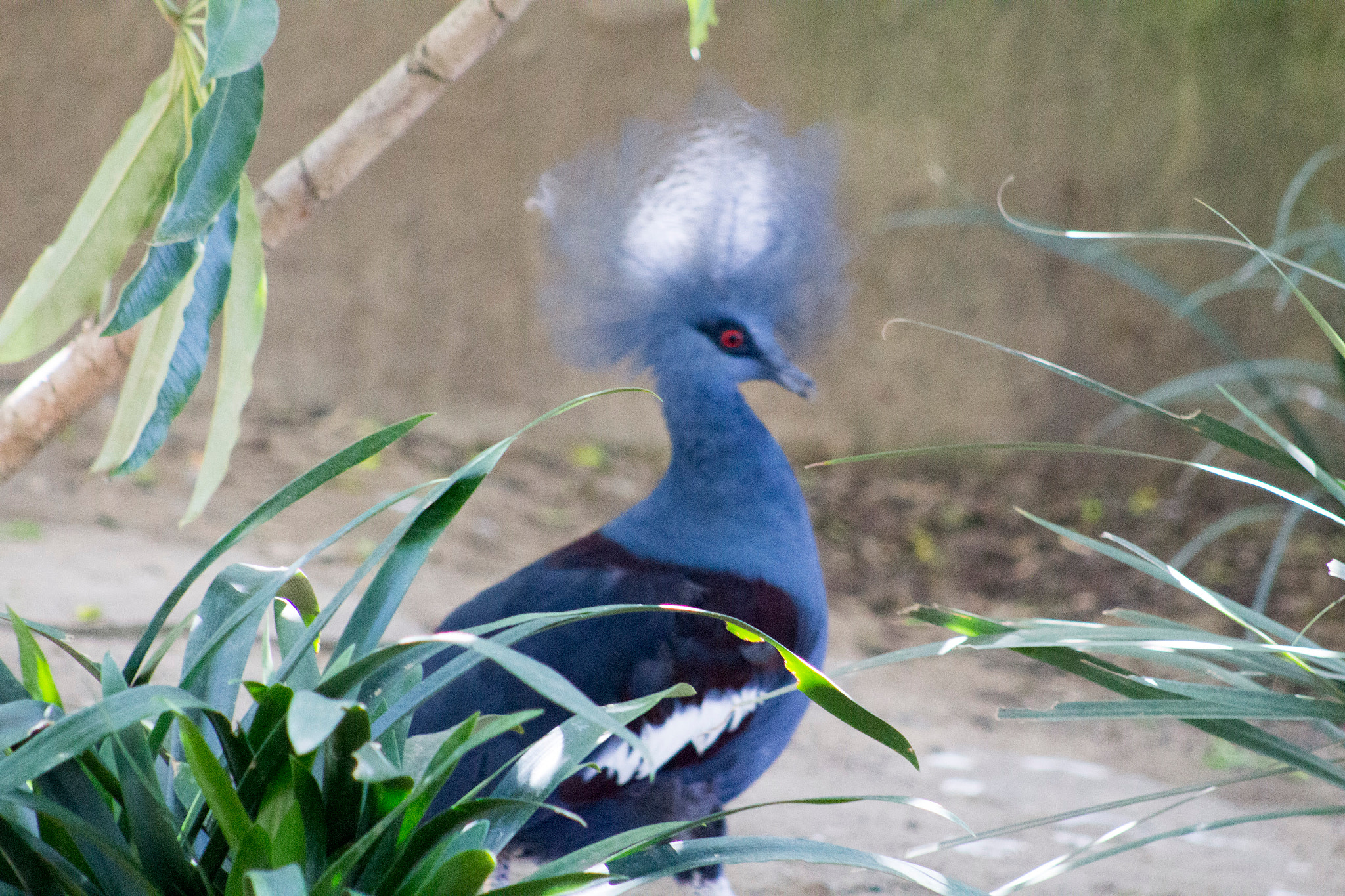
Western crowned pigeon (Goura cristata).

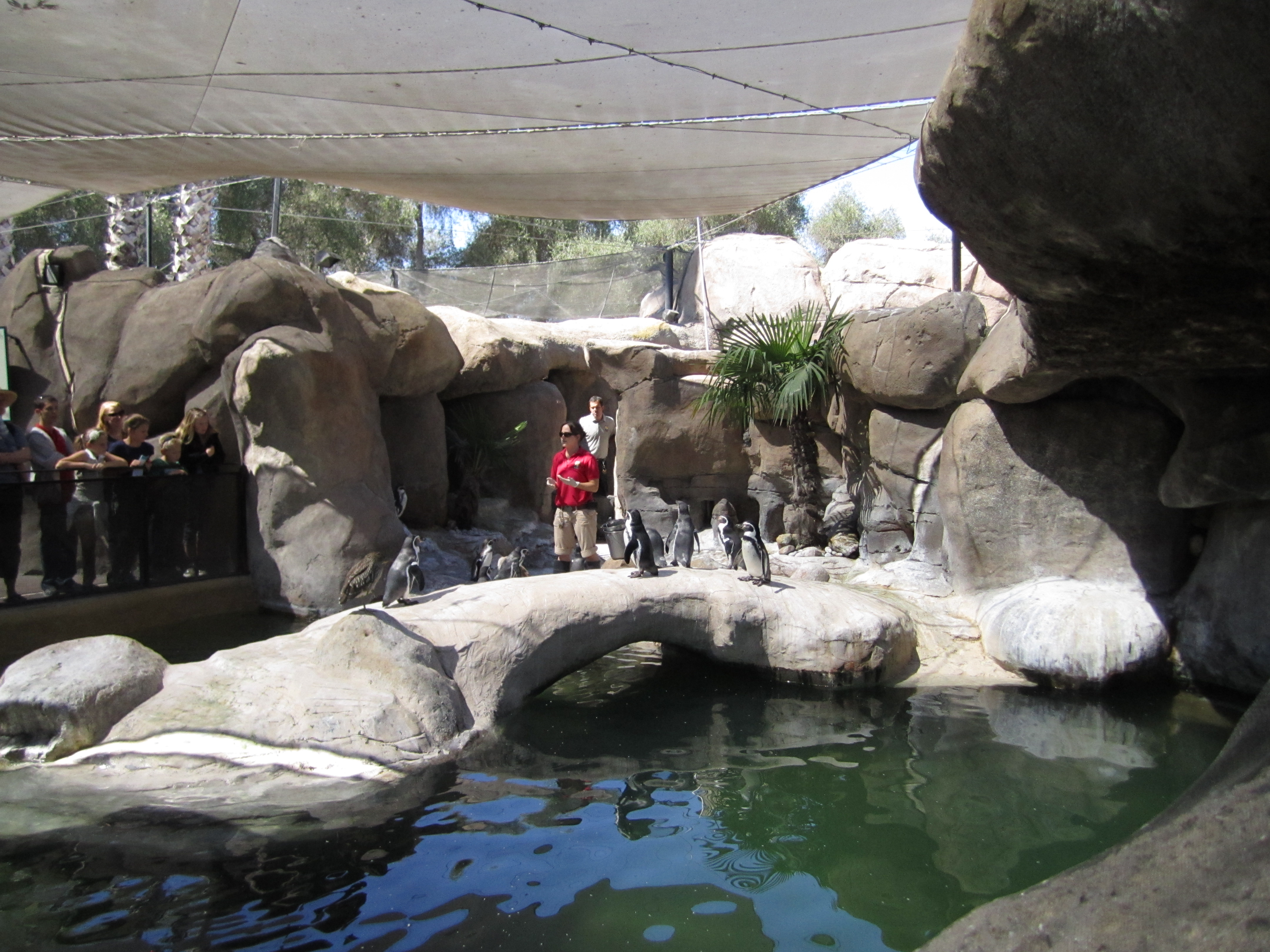
Educational show at the penguin exhibit.

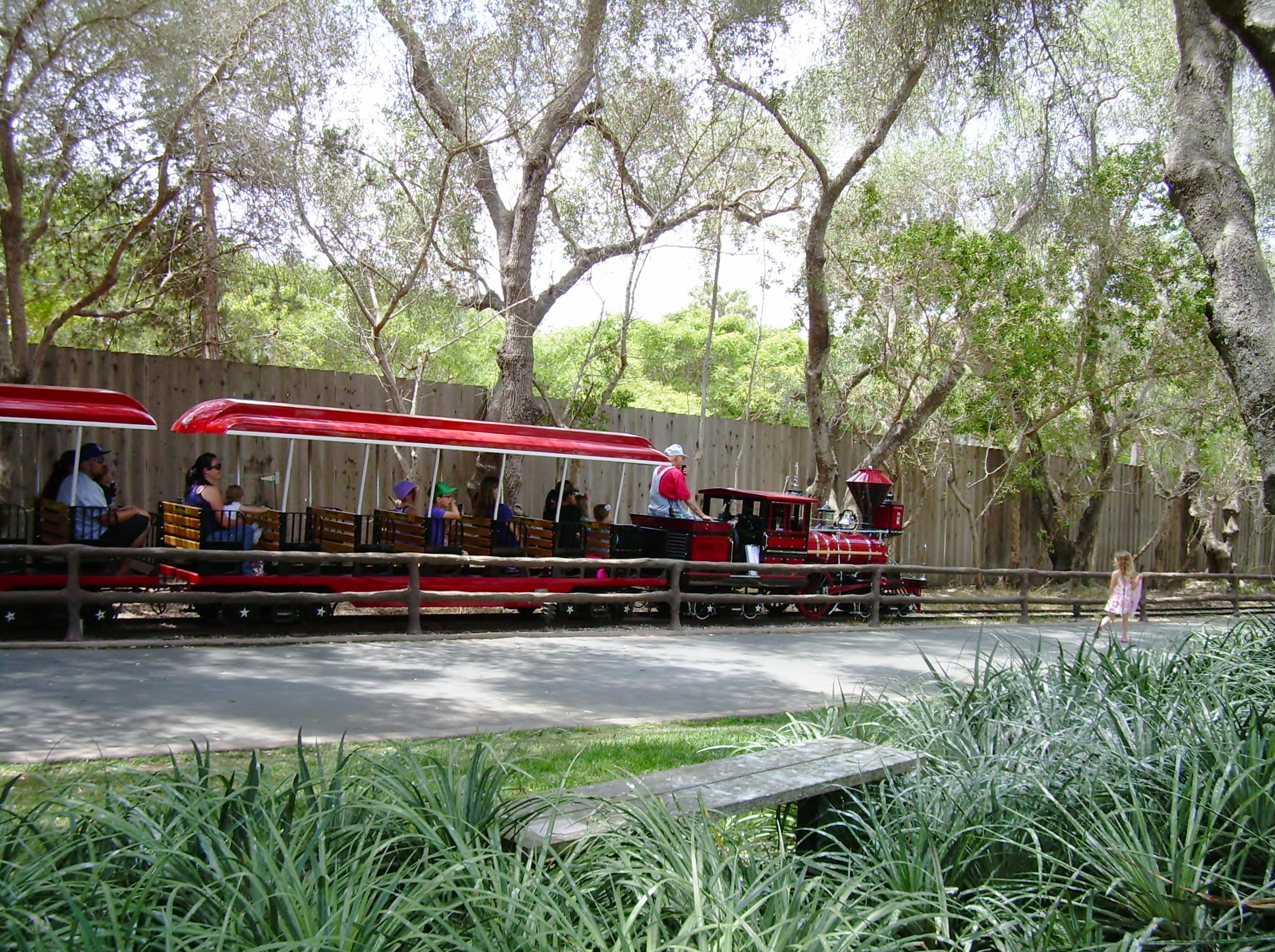
Zoo train.

== Conservation ==
Under a 2023 collaboration agreement with California State University Channel Islands, the zoo plans to open a conservation outpost on their campus with classroom and meeting spaces, conservation staff offices and facilities for animal care, containment and breeding. The zoo participates in the protection of western snowy plovers, southern sea otters, western pond turtles, red-legged frogs, and monarch butterflies.

== In popular culture ==
Gemina was featured in an episode of the television program Miracle Workers, in which she was credited with inspiring a child with scoliosis.

The Santa Barbara Zoo was featured in an episode of Behind the Bash in March 2006, when Giada de Laurentiis visited a catered wedding taking place at the zoo.

Gemina was mentioned in the show Alias: Sydney (Jennifer Garner) says "Yeah, I love it [Santa Barbara]. The zoo, that giraffe with the crooked neck." In another episode, Vaughn (Michael Vartan) says, "We went to Santa Barbara... and she [Sydney] wouldn't stop talking about the Zoo... I had this great evening planned, and I... ended up proposing on one knee in sawdust in front of a giraffe with a crooked neck."
