= Culling =

Process of segregating organisms in biology

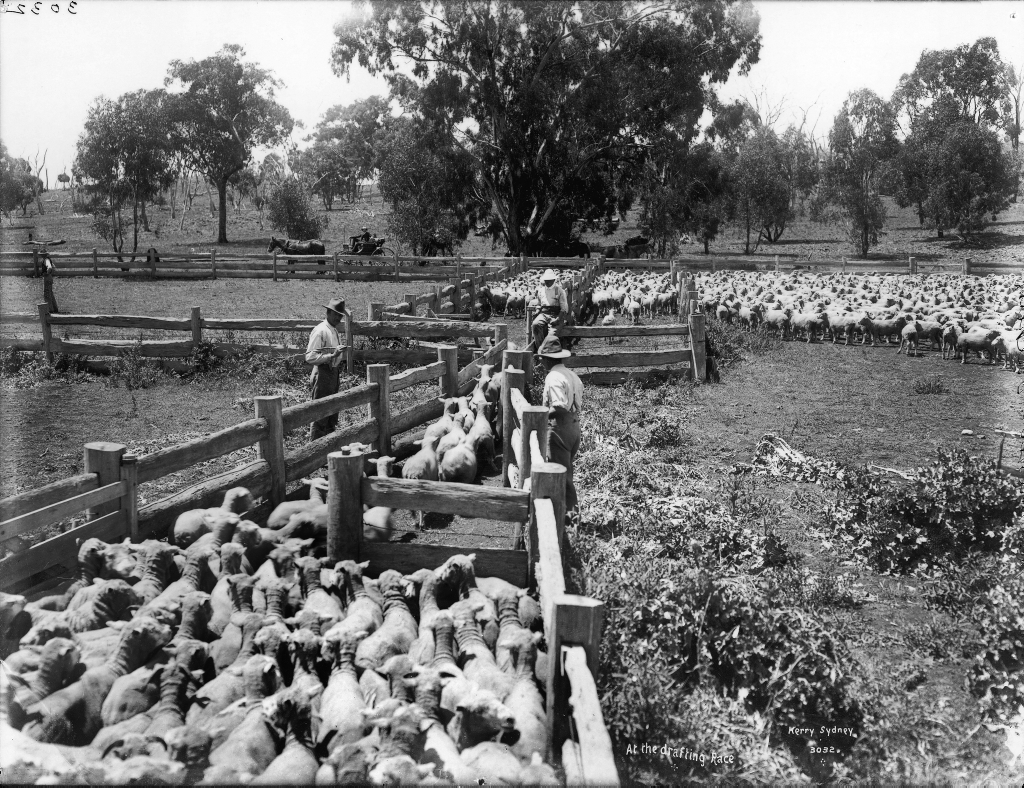
Drafting out culled sheep

Culling is the process of segregating organisms from a group according to desired or undesired characteristics. In animal breeding, it is removing or segregating animals from a breeding stock based on a specific trait. This is done to exaggerate desirable characteristics, or to remove undesirable characteristics by altering the genetic makeup of the population. For livestock and wildlife, culling often refers to killing removed animals based on their characteristics, such as their sex or species membership, or as a means of preventing infectious disease transmission.

In fruits and vegetables, culling is the sorting or segregation of fresh harvested produce into marketable lots, with the non-marketable lots being discarded or diverted into food processing or non-food processing activities. This usually happens at collection centres located at, or close to farms.

== Etymology ==
The word cull comes from the Latin verb colligere, meaning "to gather". The term can be applied broadly to mean partitioning a collection into two groups: one that will be kept and one that will be rejected. The cull is the set of items rejected during the selection process. The culling process is repeated until the selected group is of proper size and consistency desired.

== Pedigreed animals ==
Culling is:

... the rejection or removal of inferior individuals from breeding. The act of selective breeding. As used in the practice of breeding pedigree cats, this refers to the practice of spaying or neutering a kitten or cat that does not measure up to the show standard (or other standard being applied) for that breed. In no way does culling, as used by responsible breeders, signify the killing of healthy kittens or cats if they fail to meet the applicable standard.

— Robinson's Genetics for Cat Breeders and Veterinarians, Fourth Edition

In the breeding of pedigreed animals, both desirable and undesirable traits are considered when choosing which animals to retain for breeding and which to place as pets. The process of culling starts with examination of the conformation standard of the animal and will often include additional qualities such as health, robustness, temperament, color preference, etc. The breeder takes all things into consideration when envisioning their ideal for the breed or goal of their breeding program. From that vision, selections are made as to which animals, when bred, have the best chance of producing the ideal for the breed.

Breeders of pedigreed animals cull based on many criteria. The first culling criterion should always be health and robustness. Secondary to health, temperament and conformation of the animal should be considered. The filtering process ends with the breeder's personal aesthetic preferences on pattern, color, etc.

=== Tandem method ===
The tandem method is a form of selective breeding where a breeder addresses one characteristic of the animal at a time, thus selecting only animals that measure above a certain threshold for that particular trait while keeping other traits constant. Once that level of quality in the single trait is achieved, the breeder will focus on a second trait and cull based on that quality. With the tandem method, a minimum level of quality is set for important characteristics that the breeder wishes to remain constant. The breeder is focusing improvement in one particular trait without losing quality of the others. The breeder will raise the threshold for selection on this trait with each successive generation of progeny, thus ensuring improvement in this single characteristic of his breeding program.

For example, a breeder that is pleased with the muzzle length, muzzle shape, and eye placement in the breeding stock, but wishes to improve the eye shape of progeny produced may determine a minimum level of improvement in eye shape required for progeny to be returned into the breeding program. Progeny is first evaluated on the existing quality thresholds in place for muzzle length, muzzle shape, and eye placement with the additional criterion being improvement in eye shape. Any animal that does not meet this level of improvement in the eye shape while maintaining the other qualities is culled from the breeding program; i.e., that animal is not used for breeding, but is instead neutered and placed in a pet home.

=== Independent levels ===
Independent levels is a method where any animal who falls below a given standard in any single characteristic is not used in a breeding program. With each successive mating, the threshold culling criteria are raised thus improving the breed with each successive generation.

This method measures several characteristics at once. Should progeny fall below the desired quality in any one characteristic being measured, it will not be used in the breeding program regardless of the level of excellence of other traits. With each successive generation of progeny, the minimum quality of each characteristic is raised thus ensuring improvement of these traits.

For example, a breeder has a view of what the minimum requirements for muzzle length, muzzle shape, eye placement, and eye shape they are breeding toward. The breeder will determine what the minimum acceptable quality for each of these traits will be for progeny to be folded back into their breeding program. Any animal that fails to meet the quality threshold for any one of these criteria is culled from the breeding program.

=== Total score method ===
The total score method is a selection method where the breeder evaluates and selects breeding stock based on a weighted table of characteristics. The breeder selects qualities that are most important to them and assigns them a weight. The weights of all the traits should add up to 100. When evaluating an individual for selection, the breeder measures the traits on a scale of 1 to 10, with 10 being the most desirable expression and 1 being the lowest. The scores are then multiplied by their weights and then added together to give a total score. Individuals that fail to meet a threshold are culled (or removed) from the breeding program. The total score gives a breeder a way to evaluate multiple traits on an animal at the same time.

The total score method is the most flexible of the three. it allows for weighted improvement of multiple characteristics. It allows the breeder to make major gains in one aspect while moderate or lesser gains in others.

For example, a breeder is willing to make a smaller improvement in muzzle length and muzzle shape in order to have a moderate gain in improvement of eye placement and a more dramatic improvement in eye shape. Suppose the breeder determines that she would like to see 40% improvement in eye shape, 30% improvement in eye placement, and 15% improvement in both muzzle length and shape. The breeder would evaluate these characteristics on a scale of 1 to 10 and multiply by the weights. The formula would look something like: 15 (muzzle length) + 15 (muzzle shape) + 30 (eye placement) + 40 (eye shape) = total score for that animal. The breeder determines the lowest acceptable total score for an animal to be folded back into their breeding program. Animals that do not meet this minimum total score are culled from the breeding program.

== Livestock and production animals ==
Livestock bred for the production of meat or milk may be culled by farmers. Animals not selected to remain for breeding are sold, killed, or sent to the slaughterhouse.

Criteria for culling livestock and production animals can be based on population or production (milk or egg). In a domestic or farming situation, the culling process involves the selection and selling of surplus stock. The selection may be done to improve breeding stock—for example, for improved production of eggs or milk—or simply to control the group's population for environmental and species preservation. In order to increase the frequency of preferred phenotypes, agricultural practices typically involve using the most productive animals as breeding stock.

With dairy cattle, culling may be practised by inseminating cows—considered to be inferior—with beef breed semen and by selling the produced offspring for meat production.

Approximately half of the chicks of egg-laying chickens are males who would grow up to be roosters. These individuals have little use in an industrial egg-producing facility as they do not lay eggs, so the majority of male chicks are killed shortly after hatching.

Culling of farmed animals is often done with the stated aim of reducing the spread of damaging and fatal diseases such as foot-and-mouth disease, avian flu, Influenza A virus subtype H5N1 and bovine spongiform encephalopathy ("mad cow disease").

== Wildlife ==
In the United States, hunting licenses and hunting seasons are a means by which the population of game animals is maintained. Each season, a hunter is allowed to kill a certain amount of wild animals, determined both by species and sex. If the population seems to have surplus females, hunters are allowed to take more females during that hunting season. If the population is below what is desired, hunters may not be permitted to hunt that particular species, or only hunt a restricted number of males.

Populations of game animals such as elk may be informally culled if they begin to excessively eat winter food set out for domestic cattle herds. In such instances the rancher will inform hunters that they may hunt on their property in order to thin the wild herd to controllable levels. These efforts are aimed to counter excessive depletion of the winter feed supplies. Other managed culling instances involve extended issuance of extra hunting licenses, or the inclusion of additional "special hunting seasons" during harsh winters or overpopulation periods, governed by state fish and game agencies.

Culling for population control is common in wildlife management, particularly on African game farms and Australian national parks. In the case of very large animals such as elephants, adults are often targeted. Their orphaned young, easily captured and transported, are then relocated to other reserves. Culling is controversial in many African countries, but reintroduction of the practice has been recommended in recent years for use at the Kruger National Park in South Africa, which has experienced a swell in its elephant population since culling was banned in 1995.

=== Arguments against wildlife culling ===
Culling acts as a strong selection force and can therefore impact the population genetics of a species. For example, culling based on specific traits, such as size, can enforce directional selection and remove those traits from the population. This can have long-term effects on the genetic diversity of a population.

However, culling can act as a selection force intentionally implemented by humans to counteract the selection force of trophy hunting. Hunting typically enforces selection towards unfavorable phenotypic traits because of the strong hunting bias for specific traits, such as large antler size. Culling "low-quality" traits can counteract this force.

Animal rights activists argue that killing animals for any reason (including hunting) is cruel and unethical.

=== Birds ===
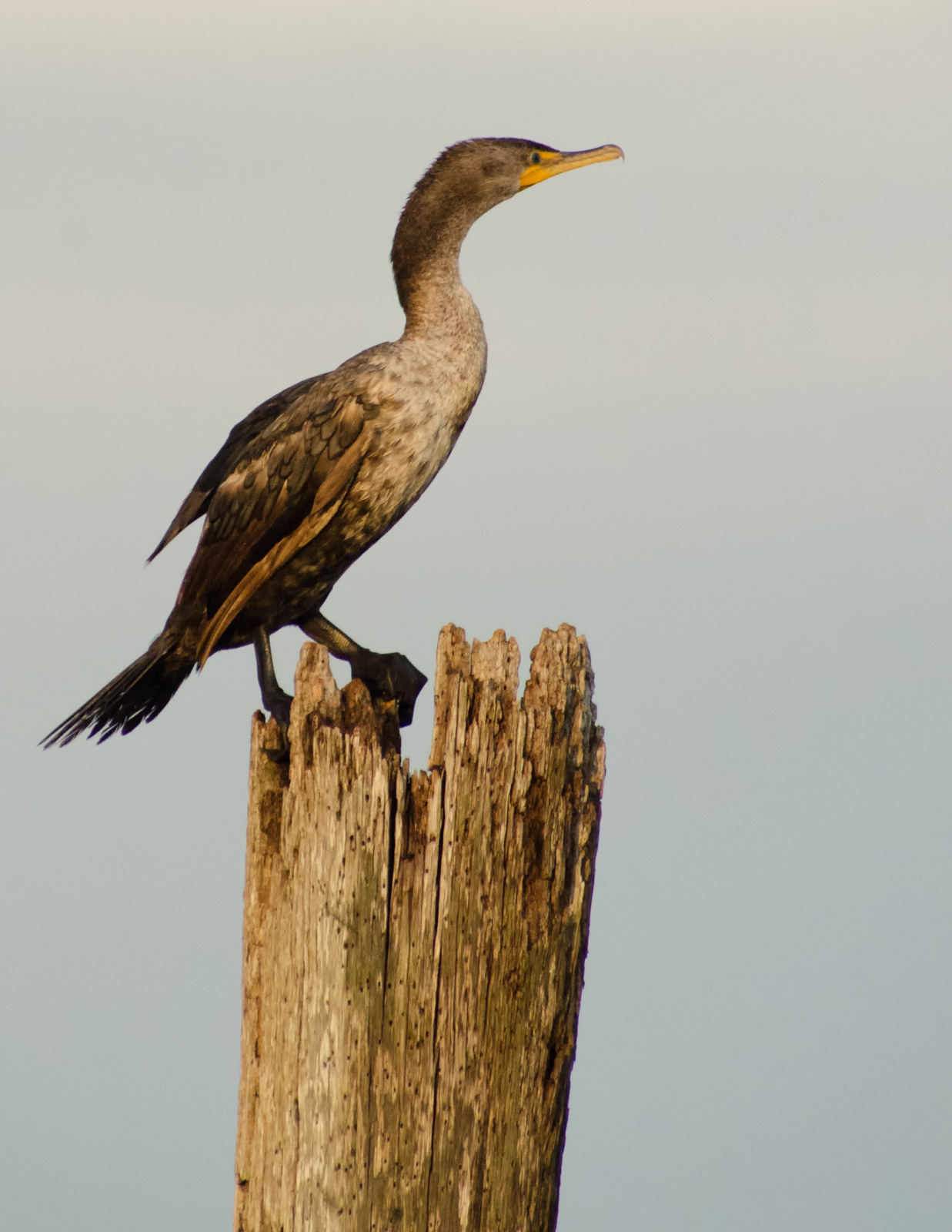
Double-crested cormorant

Some bird species are culled when their populations impact upon human property, business or recreational activity, disturb or modify habitats or otherwise impact species of conservation concern. Cormorants are culled in many countries due to their impact on commercial and recreational fisheries and habitat modification for nesting and guano deposition. They are culled by shooting and the smothering of eggs with oil. Another example is the culling of silver gulls in order to protect the chicks of the vulnerable banded stilt at ephemeral inland salt lake breeding sites in South Australia. The gulls were culled using bread laced with a narcotic substance. In the Australian states of Tasmania and South Australia, Cape Barren geese are culled to limit damage to crops and the fouling of waterholes. Cape Barren Geese remain one of the rarest geese in the world, though much of their habitat is now regarded as secure.

=== Seals ===
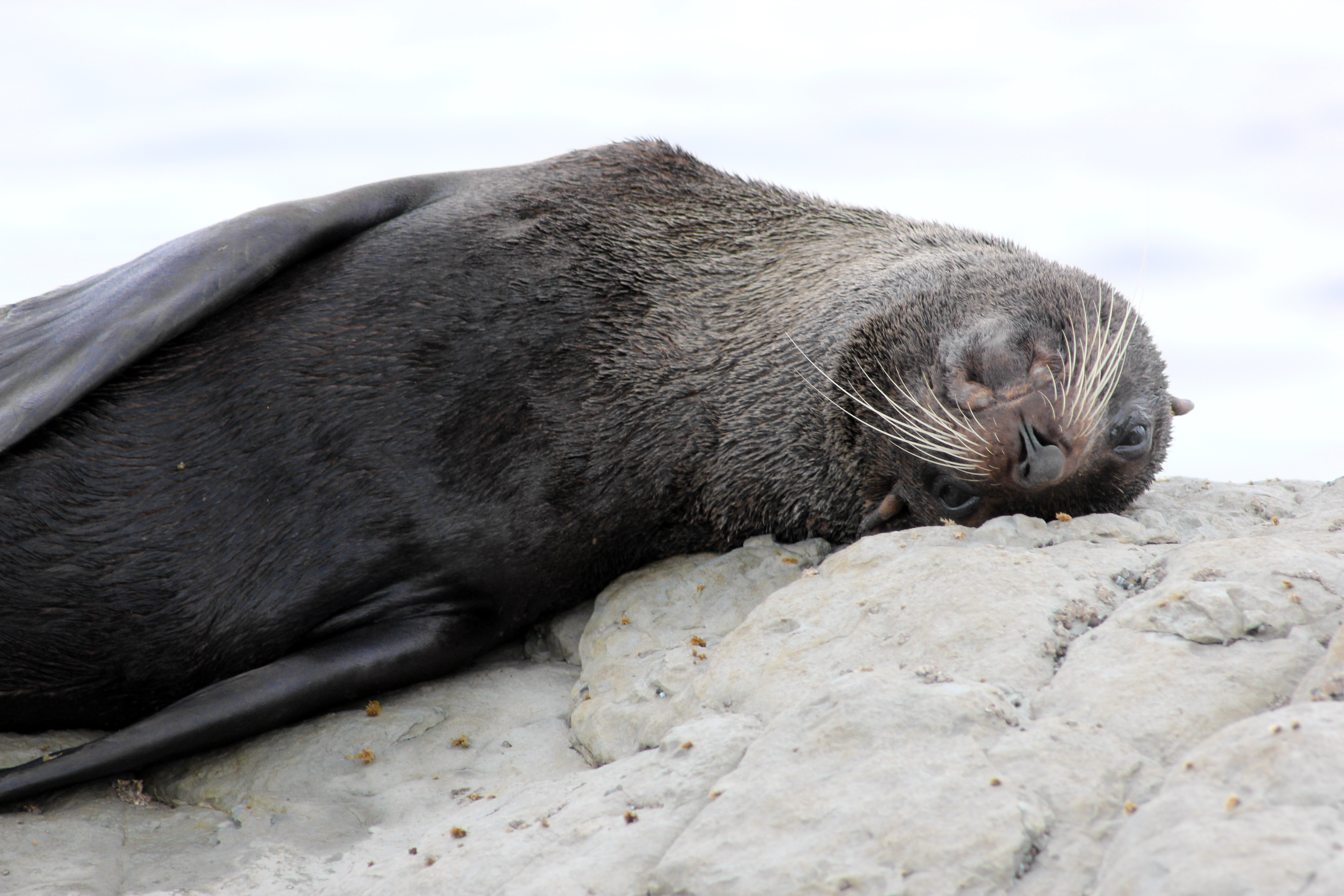
New Zealand fur seal

In South Australia, the recovery of the state's native population of New Zealand fur seals (Arctocephalus forsteri) after severe depletion by sealers in the 1800s has brought them into conflict with the fishing industry. This has prompted members of Parliament to call for seal culling in South Australia. The State Government continues to resist the pressure and as of July 2015, the animals remain protected as listed Marine Mammals under the state's National Parks and Wildlife Act 1972.

=== Sharks ===
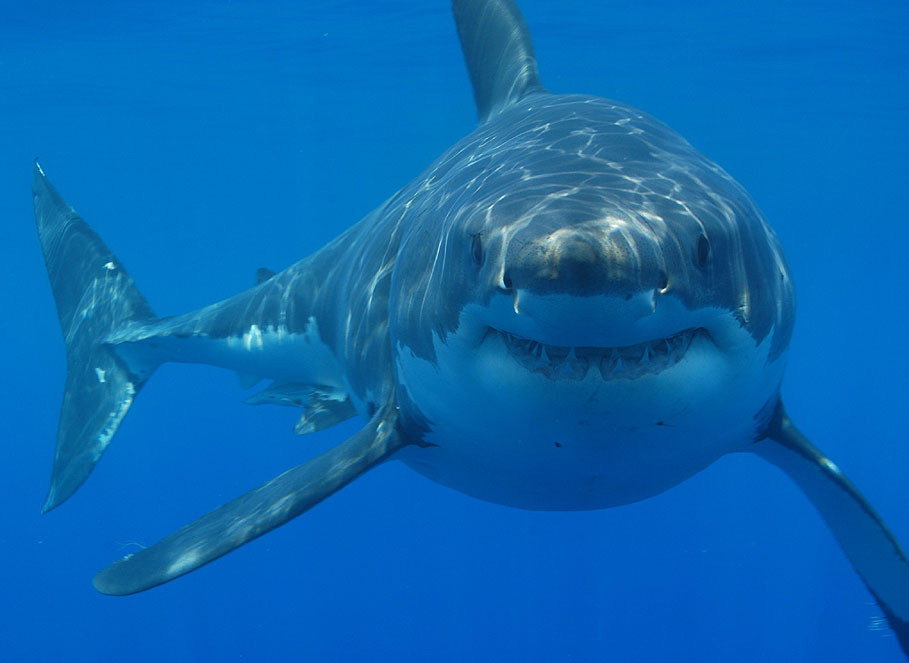
Great white shark

Shark culling occurs in four locations as of 2018: New South Wales, Queensland, KwaZulu-Natal and Réunion. Between 1950 and 2008, 352 tiger sharks and 577 great white sharks were killed in the nets in New South Wales—also during this period, a total of 15,135 marine animals were caught and killed in the nets, including whales, turtles, rays, dolphins, and dugongs. From 2001 to 2018, a total of 10,480 sharks were killed on lethal drum lines in Queensland. In a 30-year period up to early 2017, more than 33,000 sharks were killed in KwaZulu-Natal's shark-killing program—during the same 30-year period, 2,211 turtles, 8,448 rays, and 2,310 dolphins were killed. Authorities on Réunion kill about 100 sharks per year. All of these culls have been criticized by environmentalists, who say killing sharks harms the marine ecosystem.

In 2014, a controversial policy was introduced by the Western Australian state government which became known as the Western Australian shark cull. Baited hooks known as drum lines were to be set over several consecutive summers to catch and kill otherwise protected great white sharks. The policy's objective was to protect users of the marine environment from fatal shark attack. Thousands of people protested against its implementation, claiming that it was indiscriminate, inhumane and worked against scientific advice the government had previously received. Seasonal setting of drum lines was abandoned in September 2014 after the program failed to catch any great white sharks, instead catching 172 other elasmobranchii, mostly tiger sharks.

=== Deer ===
White-tailed deer (Odocoileus virginianus) have been becoming an issue in suburbs across the United States due to large population increases. This is thought to be caused mainly by the extirpation of most of their major predators in these areas. In response to these population booms, different management approaches have been taken to decrease their numbers mainly in the form of culls. Culls of deer are often partnered with exclusions with fencing and also administering contraceptives.

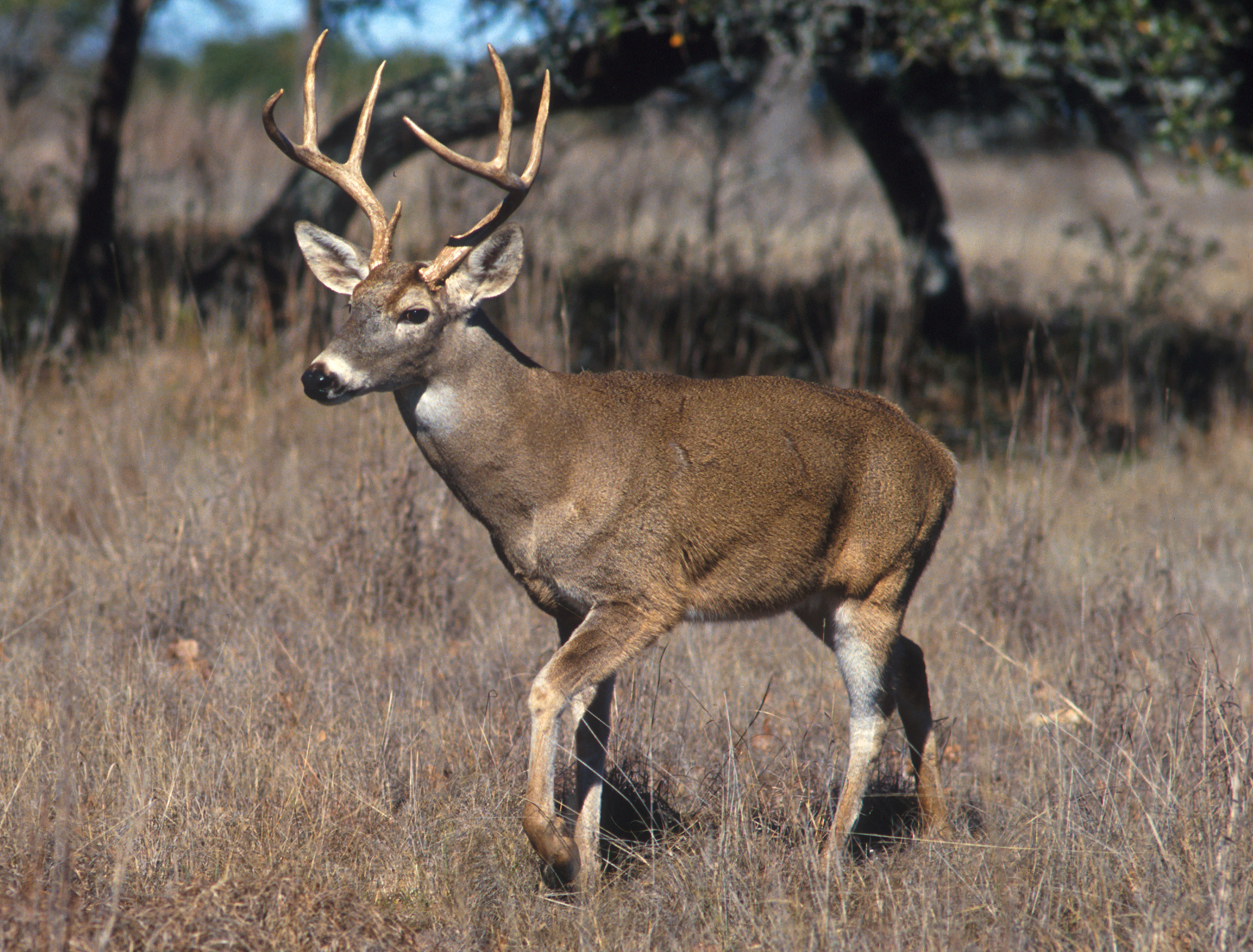
White-tailed deer buck

The effectiveness of these deer culls has been debated and often criticized as only a temporary fix to the larger problem of deer overpopulation and argue that the use of culling will increase fertility of remaining deer by reducing competition. Those in favor of the culls argue that they can be used to combat the selection pressure that is imposed by hunting that creates smaller antler and body sizes in deer. People in favor of the culls recommend that they not be random and actively select for smaller individuals and bucks with smaller antlers, specifically "button bucks" or bucks with only spiked antler in their first year as opposed to forked antlers.

Culling of deer can also have benefits in the form of disease prevention and in places that the white-tailed deer is an invasive species such as New Zealand culling of deer has added benefits for native species. Diseases are density dependent factors and decreases in the density of the deer populations through culling causes diseases, such as chronic wasting disease and Lyme disease, to spread less quickly and effectively.

== Zoos ==
Many zoos participate in an international breeding program to maintain a genetically viable population and prevent inbreeding. Animals that can no longer contribute to the breeding program are considered less desirable and are often replaced by more desirable individuals. If an animal is surplus to a zoo's requirements and a place in another zoo can not be found, the animal may be killed. In 2014, the culling of a young, healthy giraffe Marius raised an international public controversy.

Zoos sometimes consider female animals to be more desirable than males. One reason for this is that while individual males can contribute to the birth of many young in a short period of time, females give birth to only a few young and are pregnant for a relatively long period of time. This makes it possible to keep many females with just one or two males, but not the reverse. Another reason is that the birth of some animal species increases public interest in the zoo.

Germany's Animal Welfare Act 1972 orders that zoo animals cannot be culled without verification by official veterinary institutes of the Landkreis or federated state.

In the UK, there is no general prohibition on animal euthanasia, which is allowed when overcrowding compromises the well-being of the animals.

== Ethics ==
Jaak Panksepp, an American neuroscientist, concludes that both animals and humans have brains wired to feel emotions, and that animals have the capacity to experience pleasure and happiness from their lives.

Culling has been criticized on animal rights grounds as speciesist—it has been argued that killing animals for any reason is cruel and unethical, and that animals have a right to live.

Some argue that culling is necessary when biodiversity is threatened. However, the protection of biodiversity argument has been questioned by some animal rights advocates who point out that the animal which most greatly threatens and damages biodiversity is humanity, so if we are not willing to cull our own species we cannot morally justify culling another.

=== Non-lethal alternatives ===
There are non-lethal alternatives which may still be considered culling, and serve the same purpose of reducing population numbers and selecting for desired traits without killing existing members of the population. These methods include the use of wildlife contraceptives and reproductive inhibitors. By using such methods population numbers might be reduced more gradually and in a potentially more humane fashion than by directly lethal culling actions.

Currently, wildlife contraceptives are largely in the experimental phase and include such products as Gonacon, an adjuvant vaccine which delivers a high dosage of a competitor ligand of the hormone GnRH to female mammals (e.g. whitetail deer). The complex formed of GnRH and the Gonacon molecule promotes production of antibodies against the animal's own GnRH, which themselves complex with GnRH. This encourages an extended duration of the drug's effects (namely, reduction of active/unbound GnRH in the animal's system). Though the endocrinology behind Gonacon is sound, the need for multiple lifetime doses for full efficacy make it a less-guaranteed and less-permanent solution for wildlife than lethal culls. Even among domestic animals in controlled conditions, Gonacon cannot ensure 100% reduction in the occurrence of pregnancies.

Reproductive inhibitors need not act on the parental individuals directly, instead damaging reproductive processes and/or developing offspring to reduce the number of viable offspring per mating pair. One such compound called Nicarbazin has been formulated into bait for consumption by Canada Geese, and damages egg yolk formation to reduce the viability of clutches without harming the adult geese.

== See also ==
- Australian feral camel
- Badger culling in the United Kingdom
- Brumby - feral horses in Australia
- Eugenics, the selective breeding of human populations
- Experimental evolution
- Feral cats in Australia
- Foam depopulation
- Ventilation shutdown
